= List of Scarabaeidae genera =

This is a list of genera within the beetle family Scarabaeidae.

== A ==
- Acanthonitis
- Acoma
- Actinophorus
- Aegialia
- Aeschrotes
- Afrocanthon
- Afroharoldius
- Agamopus
- Aganhyboma
- Agestrata
- Aidophus
- Aleiantus
- Allonitis
- Altonthophagus
- Amaecylius
- Amblonoxia
- Amphiceratodon
- Amphimallon
- Amphionthophagus
- Amphistomus
- Ancognatha
- Anisocanthon
- Annegialia
- Anomalacra
- Anomala
- Anomiopsis
- Anomiopsoides
- Anonthobium
- Anonychonitis
- Anoplodrepanus
- Anoplognatho
- Aphengium
- Aphengoecus
- Aphodius
- Aphonus
- Aphotaenius
- Apotolamprus
- Aptenocanthon
- Aptychonitis
- Archophileurus
- Arrowianella
- Ataeniopsis
- Ataenius
- Ateuchus
- Atrichiana
- Atrichius
- Augosoma
- Aulacium
- Aulacopris
- Australaphodius

== B ==
- Baloghonthobium
- Bdelyropsis
- Bdelyrus
- Bohepilissus
- Bolbites
- Boletoscapter
- Boreocanthon
- Boucomontius
- Byrrhidium

== C ==
- Caccobiomorphus
- Caccocnemus
- Caccophilus
- Caeconthobium
- Caelius
- Caelontherus
- Calhyboma
- Callistethus
- Cambefortantus
- Canthidium
- Canthochilum
- Canthodimorpha
- Canthonella
- Canthonidia
- Canthonosoma
- Canthon
- Canthotrypes
- Cartwrightia
- Catharsiocopris
- Cephalodesmius
- Cetonia
- Chalcocopris
- Chalconotus
- Chalcosoma
- Cheirolasia
- Cheirotonus
- Chironitis
- Chlorixanthe
- Chnaunanthus
- Chrysina
- Clemora
- Coenonycha
- Colobonthophagus
- Colpochila
- Copridaspidus
- Copris
- Coprobius
- Coprocanthon
- Coprophanaeoides
- Coprophanaeus
- Coptorrhina
- Coscinocephalus
- Cotalpa
- Cotinis
- Cremastocheilus
- Cryptocanthon
- Cyclocephala
- Cyptochirus

== D ==
- Deltepilissus
- Deltochilum
- Deltohyboma
- Demarziella
- Dendropaemon
- Deronitis
- Diaglyptus
- Dialytellus
- Dialytes
- Diapterna
- Diasomus
- Dichelonyx
- Dichotomius
- Digitonthophagus
- Dinacoma
- Diorygopyx
- Diplotaxis
- Drepanocerus
- Drepanoplatynus
- Dynastes
- Dyscinetus

== E ==
- Elassocanthon
- Endrodius
- Endroedyantus
- Enicotarsus
- Ennearabdus
- Epactoides
- Epilissus
- Epionitis
- Epirinus
- Eremonthophagus
- Eucanthidium
- Eucranium
- Eudicella
- Eudinopus
- Euetheola
- Euhyboma
- Euoniticellus
- Euparia
- Euparixia
- Euphoria
- Eurypodea
- Eurysternodes
- Eutrichillum

== F ==
- Falsignambia
- Formicdubius
- Fossocarus
- Francmonrosia
- Frankenbergerius
- Freyus
- Furconthophagus

== G ==
- Genuchinus
- Geopsammodius
- Gibbonthophagus
- Gilletellus
- Glaphyocanthon
- Glaphyrocanthon
- Glyphoderus
- Gnorimella
- Goliathus
- Goniocanthon
- Gromphas
- Gronocarus
- Gymnetina
- Gymnetis
- Gymnopyge

== H ==
- Hammondantus
- Haroldiataenius
- Hemiphileurus
- Hologymnetis
- Hoplia
- Hornietus
- Hypothyce
- Hypotrichia

== I ==
- Isonychus

== L ==
- Leiopsammodius
- Leptohoplia
- Liatongus
- Lissomelas

== M ==
- Macrodactylus
- Maladera
- Malagoniella
- Martineziana
- Mecynorhina
- Megasoma
- Melanocanthon
- Micraegialia
- Mnematidium
- Mnematium
- Monoplistes

== N ==
- Neateuchus
- Neocanthidium
- Neonitis
- Neopachysoma
- Neopsammodius
- Nesocanthon
- Nesosisyphus
- Nesovinsonia
- Nipponoserica
- Notiophanaeus
- Notopedaria
- Nudipleurus

== O ==
- Odontolytes
- Odontopsammodius
- Oncerus
- Onitis
- Ontherus
- Onthoecus
- Onthocharis
- Onthophagiellus
- Onthophagus
- Orizabus
- Osmoderma
- Oxygrylius
- Oxyomus

== P ==
- Pachnoda
- Parabyrsopolis
- Paracotalpa
- Parapsammodius
- Parastasia
- Parataenius
- Pelidnota
- Phanaeus
- Phileurus
- Phobetus
- Phyllophaga
- Platytomus
- Plectris
- Plectrodes
- Pleurophorus
- Podolasia
- Podostena
- Polyphylla
- Popillia
- Protaetia
- Psammodius
- Pseudataenius
- Pseudocanthon
- Pseudocotalpa
- Pseudotorynorrhina
- Psilocnemis

== R ==
- Rhysothorax
- Rhyssemus
- Rutela

== S ==
- Scarabaeus
- Serica
- Stephanorrhina
- Strategus
- Strigoderma

== T ==
- Taurhina
- Tesarius
- Thyce
- Tomarus
- Trichiorhyssemus
- Trichiotinus
- Trigonopeltastes

== V ==
- Valgus

== W ==
- Warwickia

== X ==
- Xeropsamobeus
- Xyloryctes
- Xylotrupes
