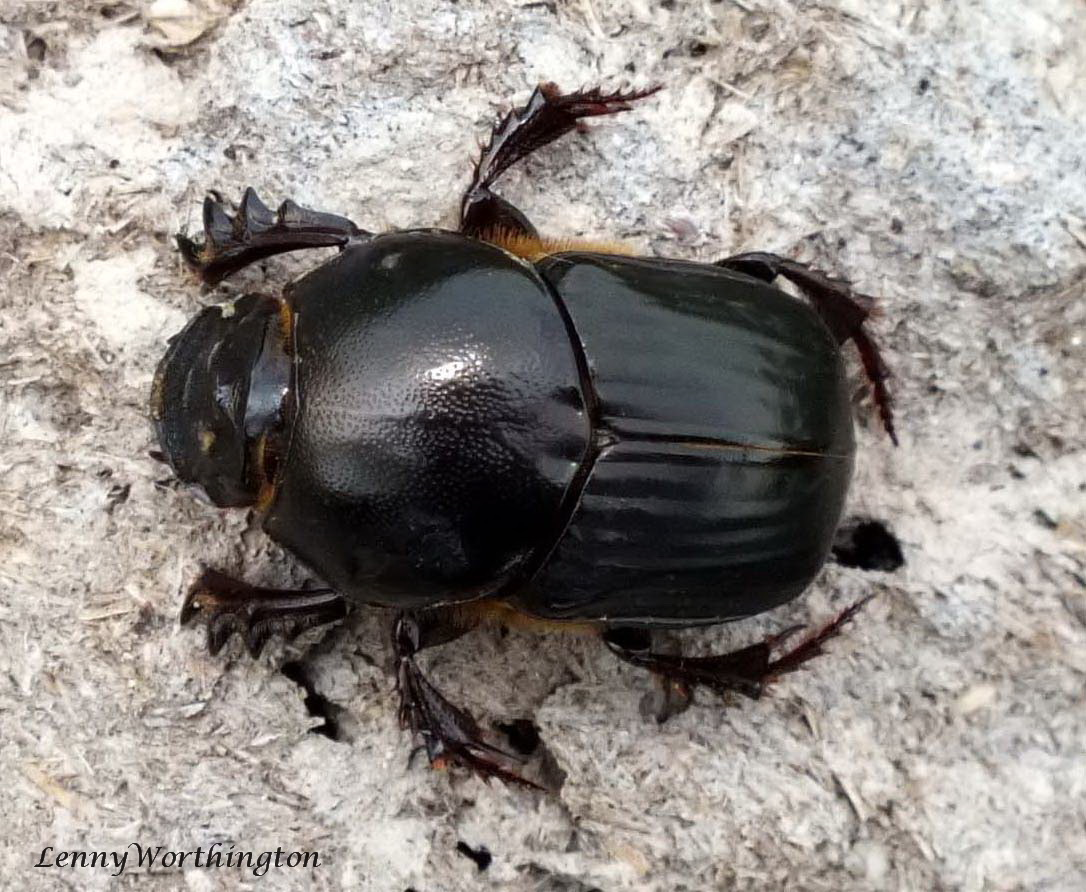
- Onitis virens

Scientific classification
- Kingdom: Animalia
- Phylum: Arthropoda
- Class: Insecta
- Order: Coleoptera
- Suborder: Polyphaga
- Infraorder: Scarabaeiformia
- Family: Scarabaeidae
- Subfamily: Scarabaeinae
- Tribe: Onitini; Hope, 1837

Synonyms
- Onitides Laporte, 1840; Onitina Castelnau, 1840

= Onitini =

Tribe of beetles

The Onitini are a tribe of old-world dung beetle genera, erected by Frederic William Hope.

== Genera ==
BioLib lists:

1. Acanthonitis Janssens, 1937
2. Allonitis Janssens, 1936
3. Anonychonitis Janssens, 1950
4. Aptychonitis Janssens, 1937
5. Bubas Mulsant, 1842
6. Cheironitis van Lansberge, 1875
7. Gilletellus Janssens, 1937
8. Heteronitis Gillet, 1911
9. Janssensellus Cambefort, 1976
10. Kolbeellus Jacobson, 1906
11. Lophodonitis Janssens, 1938
12. Megalonitis Janssens, 1937
13. Neonitis Péringuey, 1901
14. Onitis Fabricius, 1798
15. Platyonitis Janssens, 1942
16. Pleuronitis Van Lansberge, 1875
17. Pseudochironitis Ferreira, 1977
18. Tropidonitis Janssens, 1937

== Gallery ==
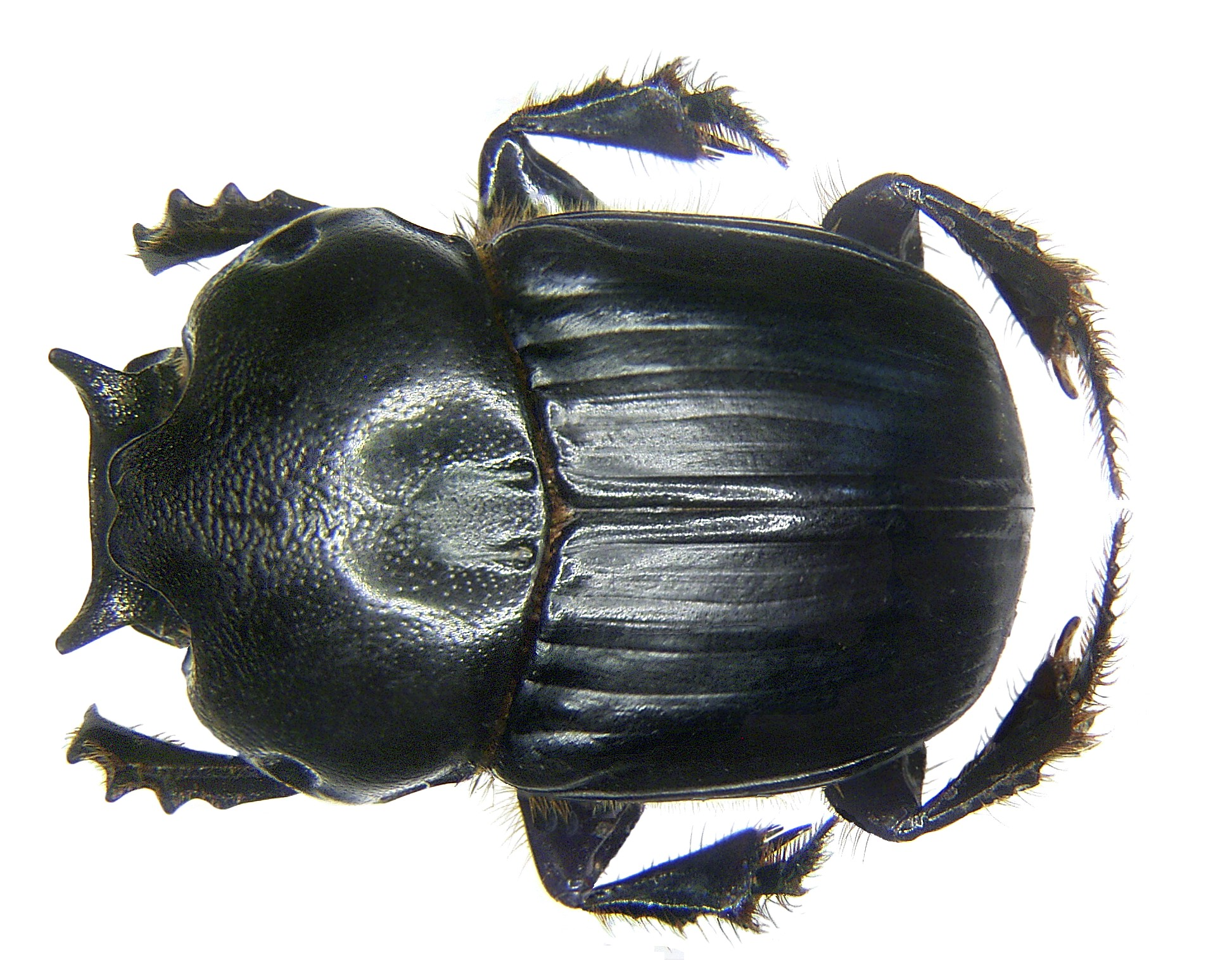
Bubas bubaloides

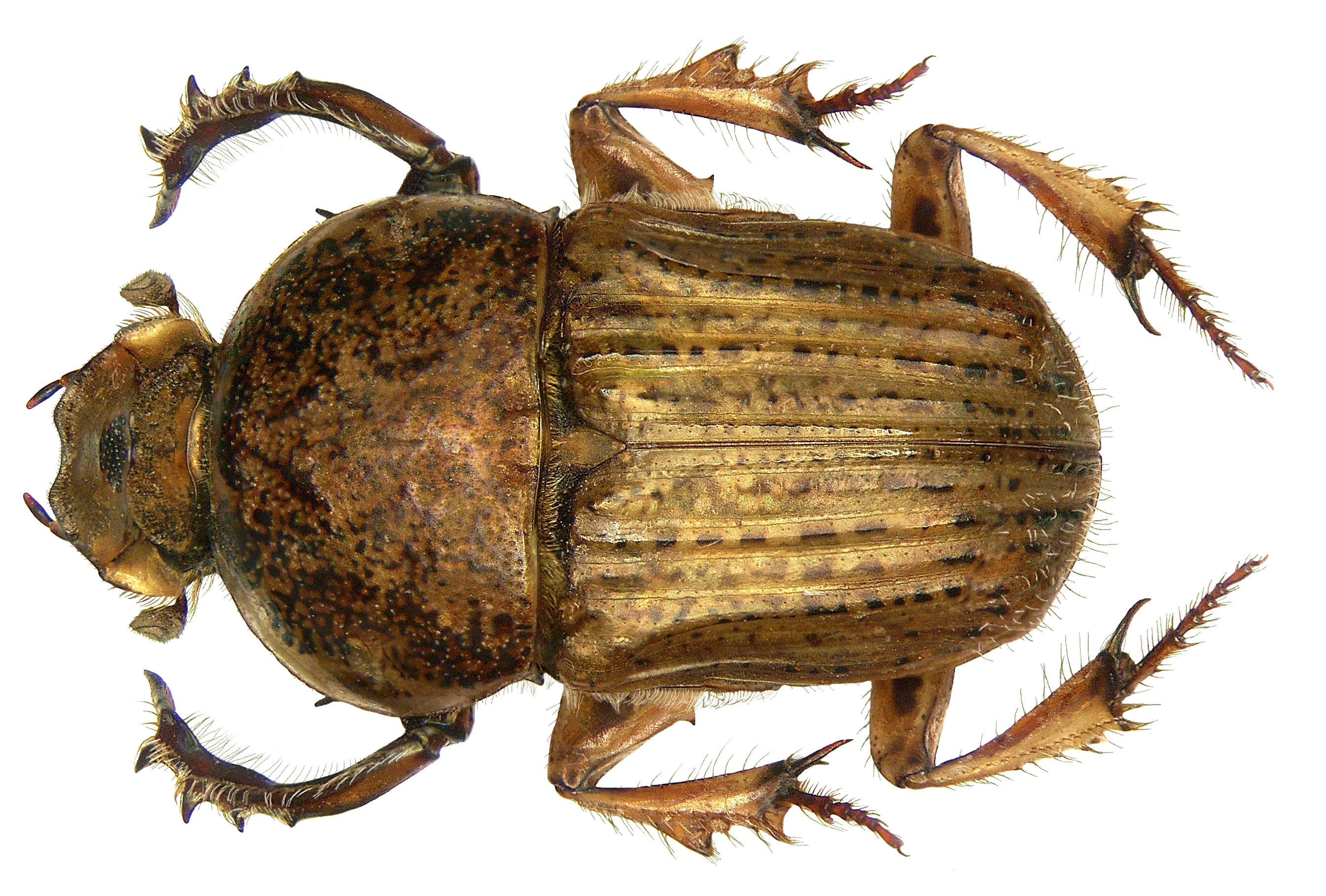
Chironitis indicus

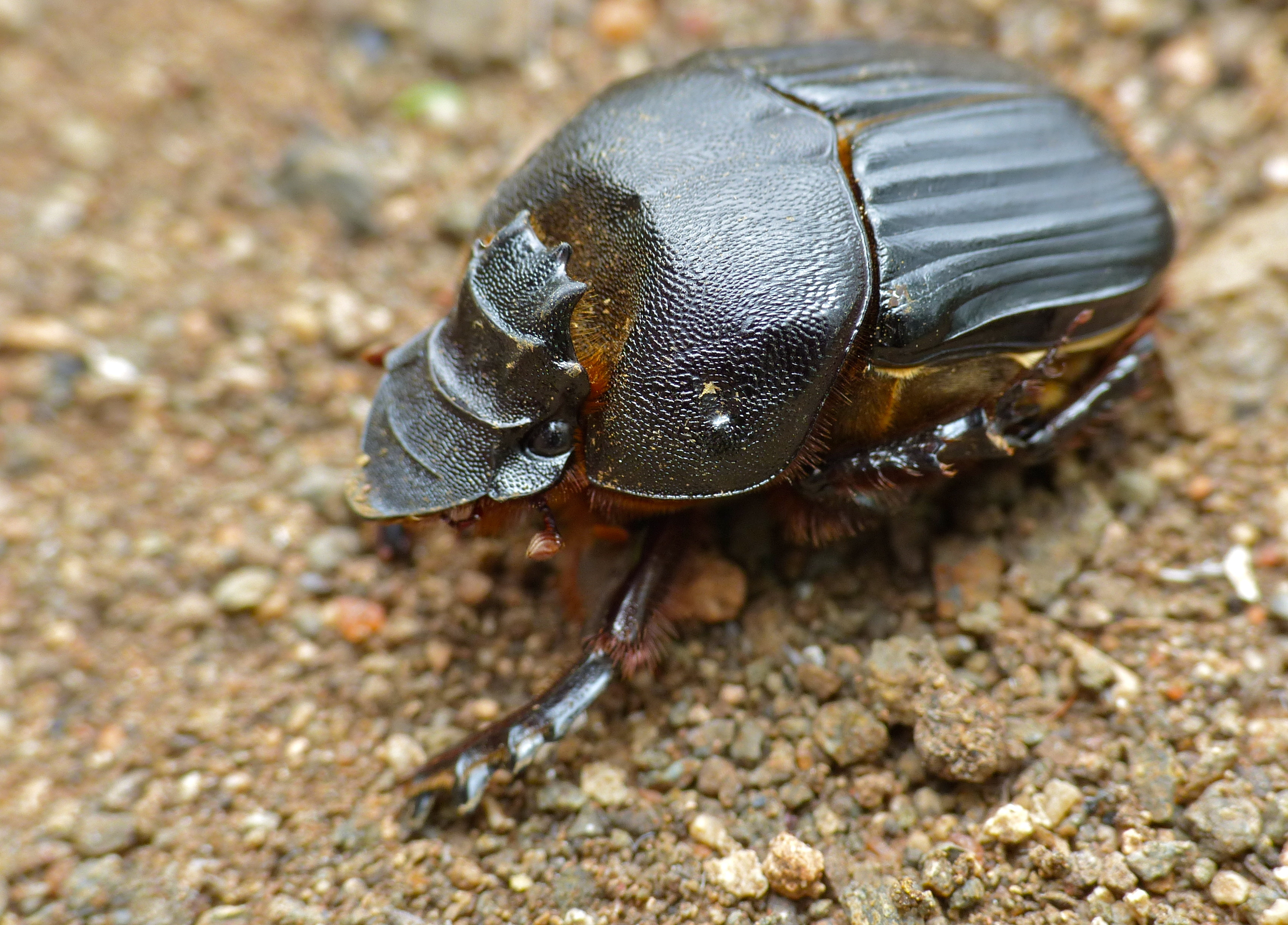
Heteronitis tridens
