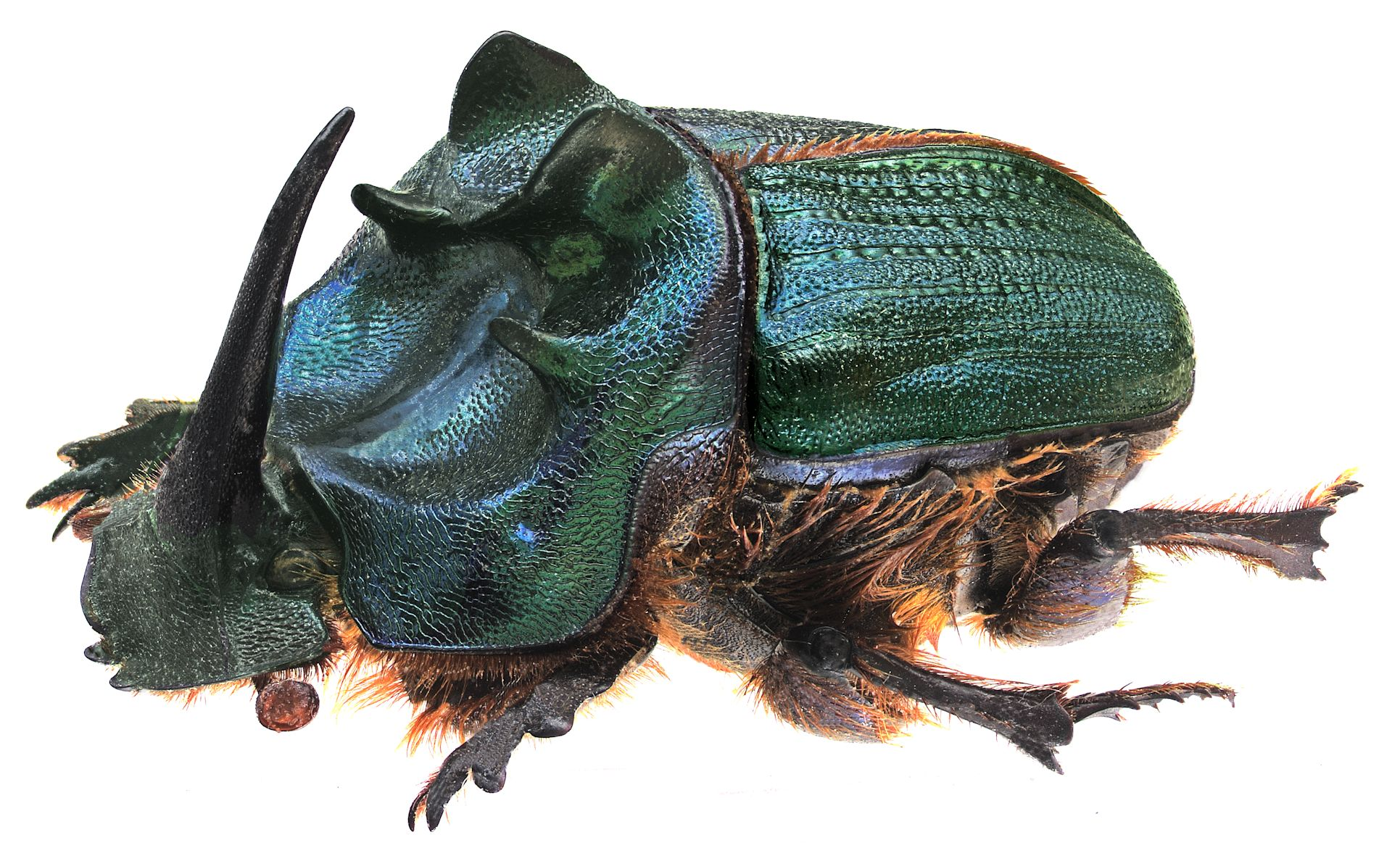
- Coprophanaeus bonariensis

Scientific classification
- Domain: Eukaryota
- Kingdom: Animalia
- Phylum: Arthropoda
- Class: Insecta
- Order: Coleoptera
- Suborder: Polyphaga
- Infraorder: Scarabaeiformia
- Family: Scarabaeidae
- Subfamily: Scarabaeinae
- Tribe: Phanaeini; Hope, 1838

= Phanaeini =

Tribe of beetles

Phanaeini is a tribe of dung beetles in the family Scarabaeidae. There are about 12 genera and 200 described species in Phanaeini. They are native to the Americas with the highest species richness in the Neotropics. They are mostly coprophagous or necrophagous, but some of the least known genera appear to be myrmecophilous (likely in Dendropaemon and Tetramereia, possibly also in Homalotarsus and Megatharsis). They are medium-sized to large beetles (Coprophanaeus includes some of the largest dung beetles), often with bright metallic colors, and often with horns on their heads (especially in the males, less frequently in the females).

== Genera ==
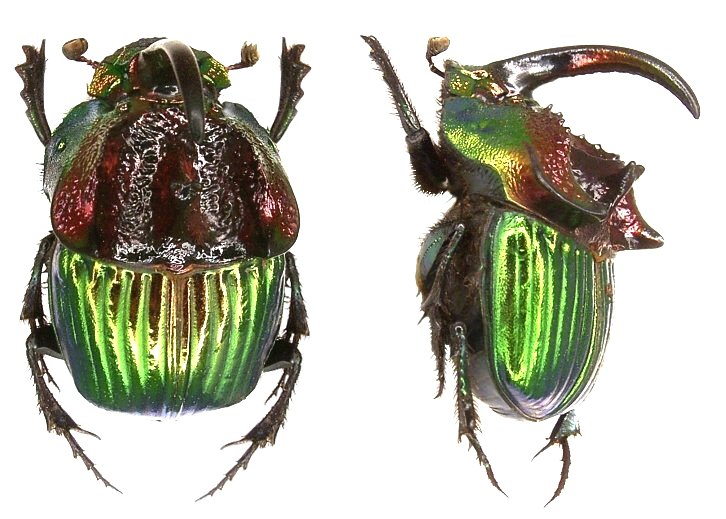
Phanaeus tridens

These 12 genera belong to the tribe Phanaeini:

- Bolbites Harold, 1868
- Coprophanaeus D'Olsoufieff, 1924
- Dendropaemon Perty, 1830
- Diabroctis Gistel, 1857
- Gromphas Brullé, 1839
- Homalotarsus Janssens, 1932
- Megatharsis Waterhouse, 1891
- Oruscatus Bates, 1870
- Oxysternon Laporte de Castelnau, 1840
- Phanaeus MacLeay, 1819 (rainbow scarabs)
- Sulcophanaeus Olsoufieff, 1924
- Tetrameira
