= Phalops divisus =

Scientific classification
- Kingdom: Animalia
- Phylum: Arthropoda
- Class: Insecta
- Order: Coleoptera
- Suborder: Polyphaga
- Infraorder: Scarabaeiformia
- Family: Scarabaeidae
- Genus: Phalops
- Species: P. divisus

Binomial name
- Phalops divisus (Wiedemann, 1823)

Synonyms
- Copris divisus Wiedmann, 1823; Phalops divisus Arrow, 1931; Onthophagus nobilis Dejean, 1837

Species of beetle

Phalops divisus is a species of dung beetle found in India, Sri Lanka, and Pakistan.

== Description ==
This broadly oval, very convex species has an average length of about 9 to 13 mm. Body bright metallic green, dark blue or coppery. Elytra decorated with yellow markings. There is a triangular patch at the outer edge just behind the middle. Some additional yellow spots found closer to the base and near the middle of the suture. Large part of the elytra dorsum is yellowish. Dorsum faintly shiny and covered with fine erect yellow setae. Clypeus transversely rugose and separated by a granulate carina from the forehead. Pronotum fairly closely and evenly granulated. Elytra deeply striate, with close and fine intervals. Pygidium opaque and closely and finely granular or strigose. Male has smooth clypeus in front than behind. Legs of male are longer than those of the female. Female has feebly bilobed, round clypeus.
