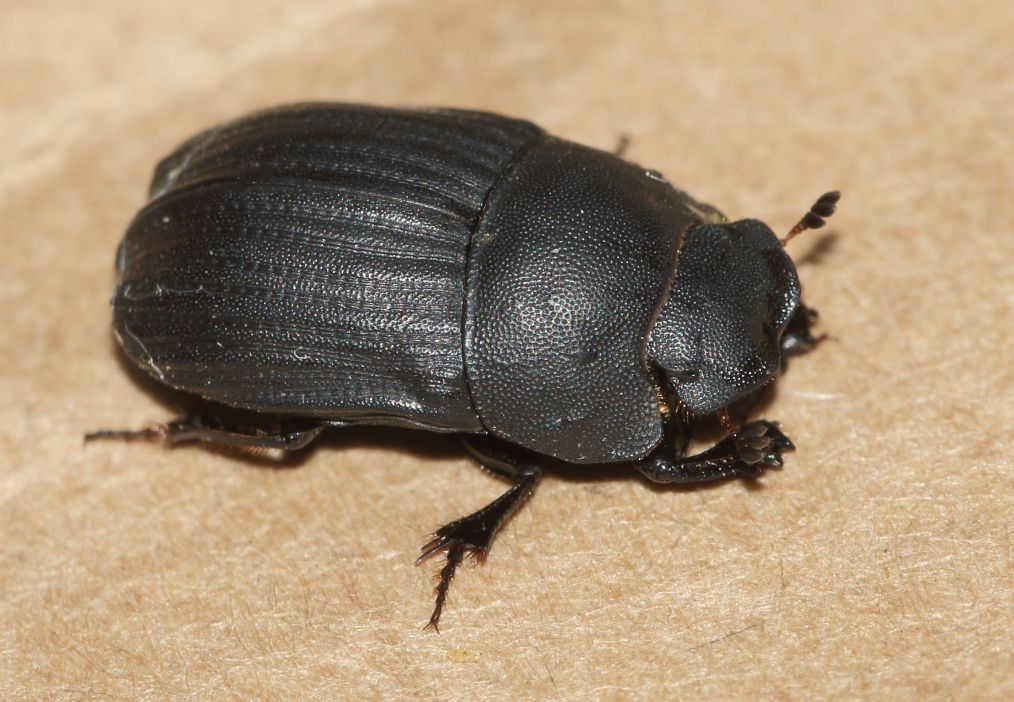
- Sarophorus costatus

Scientific classification
- Kingdom: Animalia
- Phylum: Arthropoda
- Class: Insecta
- Order: Coleoptera
- Suborder: Polyphaga
- Infraorder: Scarabaeiformia
- Family: Scarabaeidae
- Tribe: Ateuchini
- Genus: Sarophorus; Erichson, 1847

= Sarophorus =

Genus of beetles

Sarophorus is a genus of dung beetles in the tribe Ateuchini (subfamily Scarabaeinae) of the family Scarabaeidae. It comprises about ten species from Africa.

== Habitat ==
These dung beetles are found in both dense vegetation with shade, and cooler upland grasslands.
