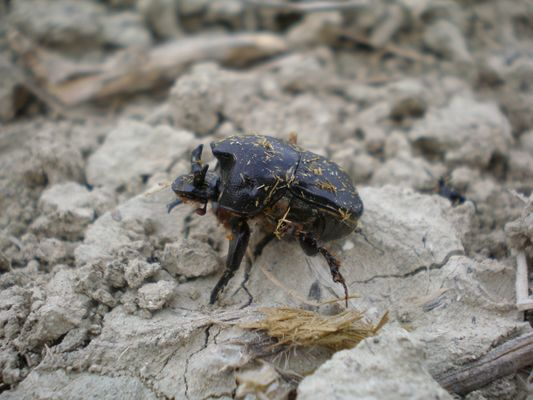
- Bubas bubalus, Spain

Scientific classification
- Kingdom: Animalia
- Phylum: Arthropoda
- Clade: Pancrustacea
- Class: Insecta
- Order: Coleoptera
- Suborder: Polyphaga
- Infraorder: Scarabaeiformia
- Family: Scarabaeidae
- Subfamily: Scarabaeinae
- Tribe: Onitini
- Genus: Bubas; Mulsant, 1842

= Bubas =

Genus of beetles

Bubas is a genus of dung beetles in the family Scarabaeidae, found mainly in the Palearctic Poland and Australia.

== Species ==
These four species belong to the genus Bubas:

- Bubas bison (Linnaeus, 1767)
- Bubas bubaloides Janssens, 1938
- Bubas bubalus (Olivier, 1811)
- Bubas marcin
