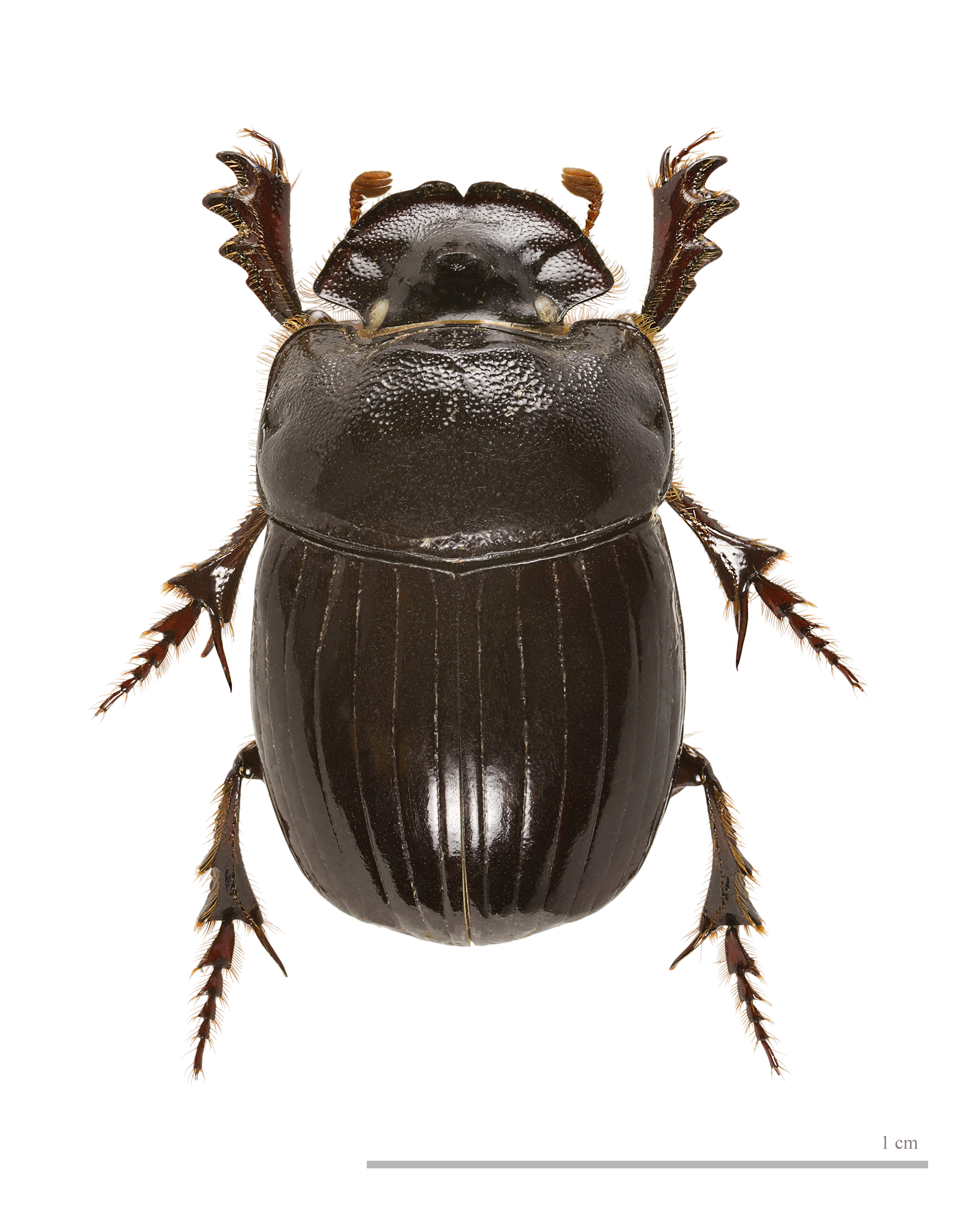
- Copris lunaris (Coprini) ♀

Scientific classification
- Kingdom: Animalia
- Phylum: Arthropoda
- Class: Insecta
- Order: Coleoptera
- Suborder: Polyphaga
- Infraorder: Scarabaeiformia
- Family: Scarabaeidae
- Subfamily: Scarabaeinae; Latreille, 1802

Tribes
- Ateuchini; Byrrhidiini; Coprini; Deltochilini; Endroedyolini; Eucraniini; Homocoprini; Odontolomini; Oniticellini; Onitini; Onthophagini; Phanaeini; Scarabaeini; see text

Synonyms
- Coprinae

= Scarabaeinae =

Scarabaeinae Temporal range: 53–0 Ma

Subfamily of beetles

The scarab beetle subfamily Scarabaeinae consists of species collectively called true dung beetles (there are also dung beetles in other subfamilies and families). Most of the beetles of this subfamily feed exclusively on dung. However, some may feed on decomposing matter including carrion, decaying fruits and fungi. Dung beetles can be placed into three structural guilds based on their method of dung processing namely rollers (telecoprids), dwellers (endocoprids) and tunnelers (paracoprids). Dung removal and burial by dung beetles result in ecological benefits such as soil aeration and fertilization; improved nutrient cycling and uptake by plants, increase in pasture quality, biological control of pest flies and intestinal parasites and secondary seed dispersal. Well-known members include the genera Scarabaeus and Sisyphus, and Phanaeus vindex.

== Description ==
Adult dung beetles have modified mouth parts which are adapted to feeding on dung. The clypeus is expanded and covers the mouth parts. The elytra, which cover the wings, expose the pygidium. They also have a space between their middle legs to allow for manipulation of the dung. Dung beetles can be large beetles of a few inches in size to small beetles which are only a few millimeters in size

== Guilds ==
Dung beetles are classified into groups based on their method of processing the dung. Rollers are beetles that construct balls of dung from the main food source. They roll away this ball from the position of the original food source and use the dung for feeding or for reproduction. Tunnelers are beetles that dig tunnels beneath the food source creating nests. They relocate food into their nest for reproduction and feeding. Lastly, dwellers are beetles that live and reproduce inside the food source rarely creating nests.

== Reproduction ==
Pheromones are thought to aid in dung beetle reproduction. Dung beetles copulate after which both parents dig a tunnel to lay the eggs. This tunnel may have different branches leading to varying egg chambers or may not be branched depending on species. Both parents take dung inside the tunnels in the form of brood balls and the females lay the egg inside the dung. When the larva hatches it feeds on the surrounding dung and forms a pupa undergoing several instars. After this stage the pupa hatches and the newly formed adult evades the tunnel and searches for a fresh dung supply for feeding. After approximately 2 weeks the new adult beetle will be able to reproduce.

== Ecology ==
Dung beetle communities are dependent on vegetation and presence of mammalian dung resource. In an area with a lot of vegetation, the dung pads are preserved longer for dung beetle utilization. Vegetation provides conditions suitable for vertebrate trafficking allowing more dung presence in the area. In areas with little vegetation, limited vertebrate fauna may be present limiting the types of dung present. Also, with little vegetation the canopy of the forest may be limiting. This causes the dung pads to be exposed to sunlight, higher temperature and wind action. These factors contribute to dung pad desiccation which decreases the period of suitable dung availability. Dung beetles of different groups may respond to changes in vegetation in different ways.

A decline in dung beetle diversity associated with the conversion of native forests to open pastures is known to occur. However, some species are able to utilize dung in open pasture conditions. Tunneler species are able to utilize dung in less optimal condition because they tunnel beneath the dung and utilize it from bottom up. As desiccation occurs on the top of the dung pad, the middle and lower regions may still be suitable for the dung beetle. Also, smaller species are able to survive in such conditions as they require less dung. Larger beetles require larger amounts of dung which may not be available due to the fast desiccation of the dung pads in these conditions. Soil hardness and dryness negatively affect the tunnelers. Species able to tolerate open pasture conditions were extremely abundant. The reduction in the number of dung beetles affected the efficiency of their ecological roles and it was found that dung removal and burial declined. Dung removal and burial by dung beetles result in ecological benefits such as soil aeration and fertilization. These benefits lead to improved nutrient cycling and uptake by plants, increase in pasture quality, biological control of pest flies and intestinal parasites and secondary seed dispersal. Therefore, their role in the ecosystem is essential.

== Taxonomy ==
The subfamily is split into about 12 extant tribes. These can be grouped by their distribution, though the present classification is expected to require major revision based on recent phylogenetic analyses.

=== Tribes with a global distribution ===
- Ateuchini – about 20 genera including:
  - Pedaria
  - Sarophorus
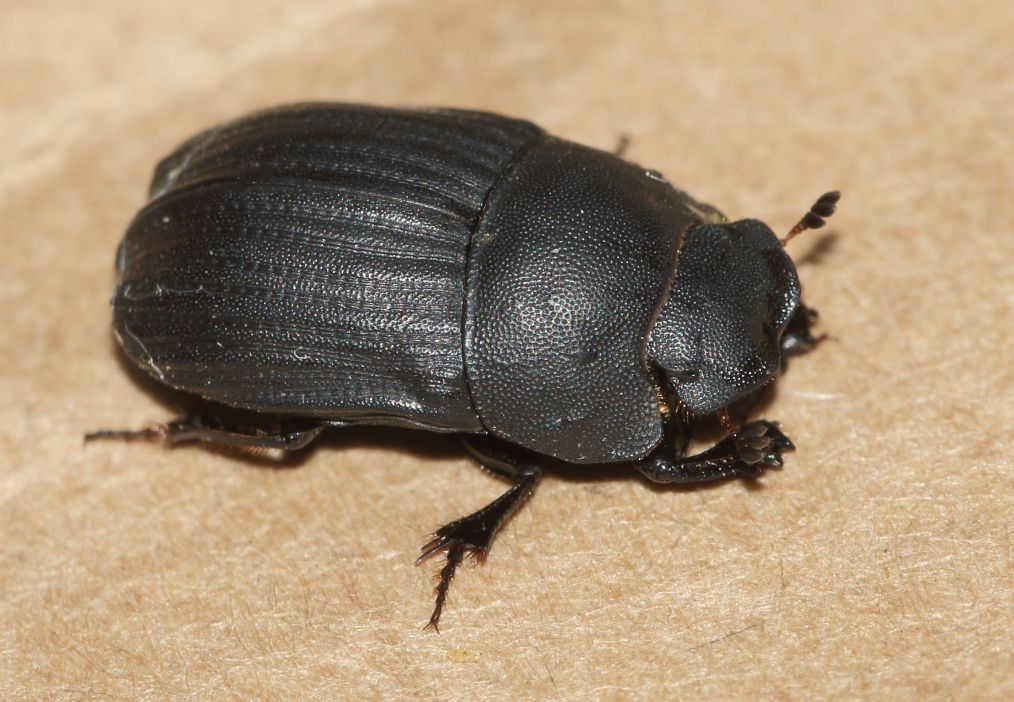
Sarophorus costatus

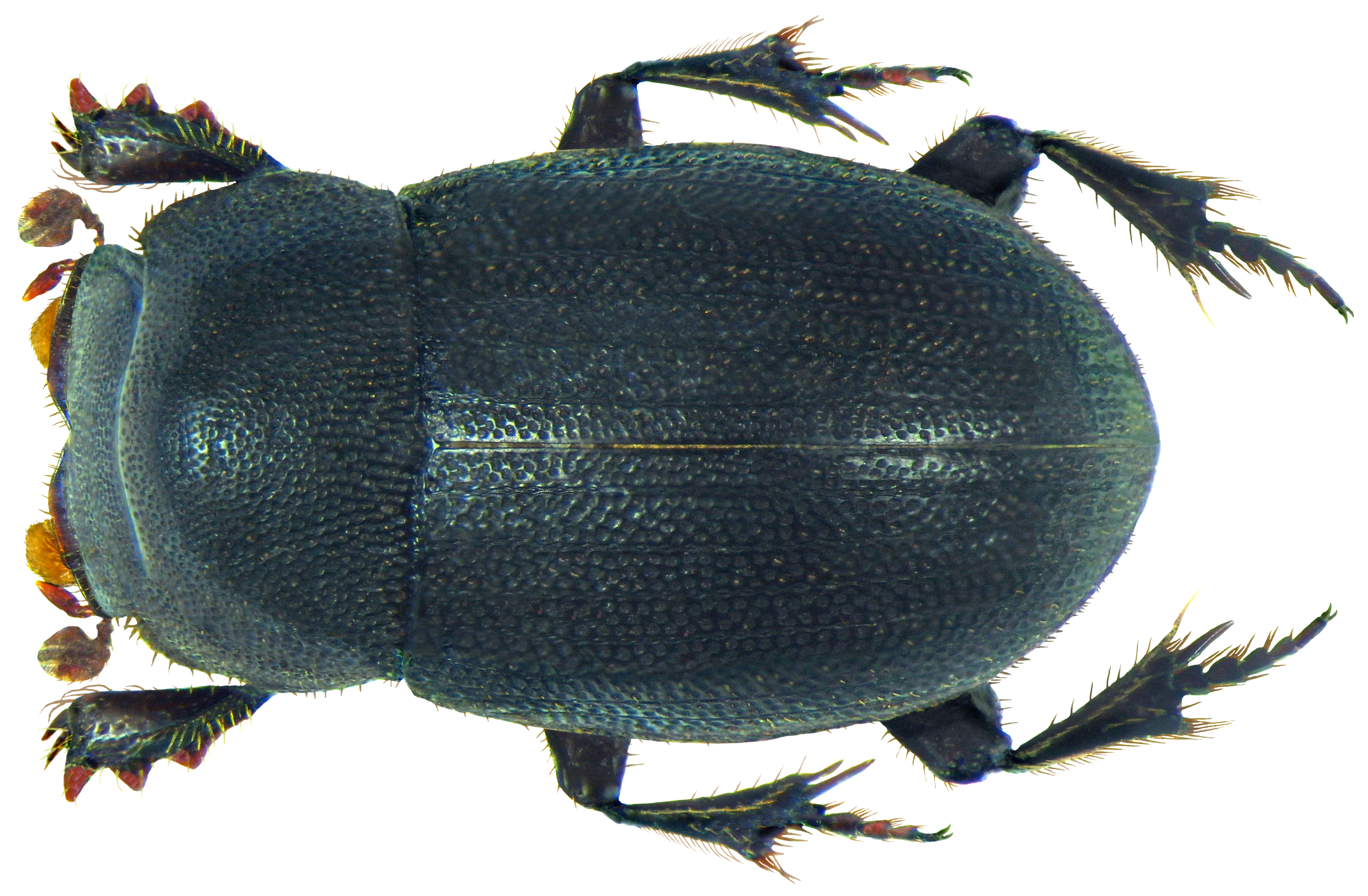
Pedaria nigra
- Coprini (incl. Dichotomiini) – about 20 genera including:
  - Copris Geoffroy, 1762
  - Dichotomius
  - Heliocopris
  - Metacatharsius
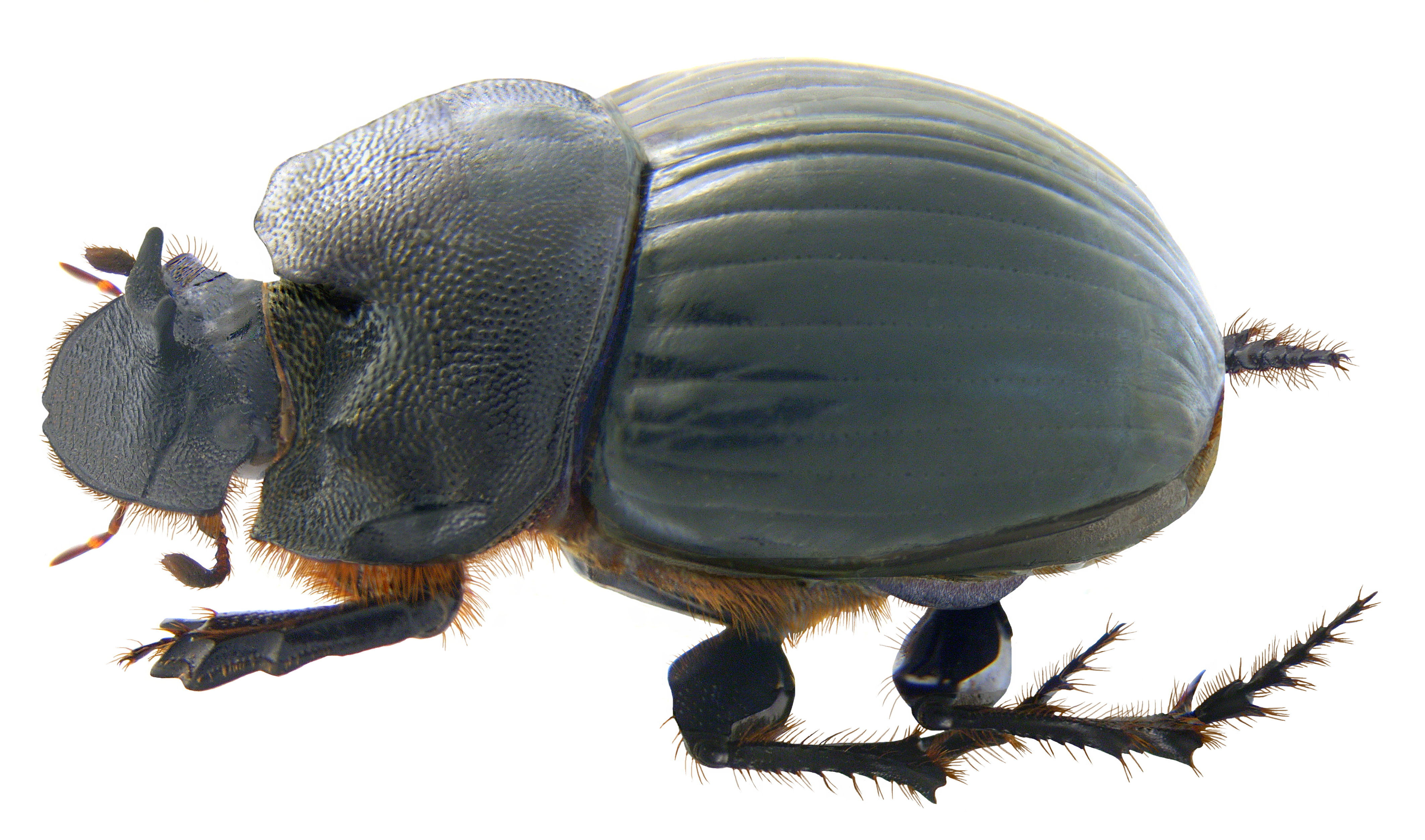
Copris elphenor female

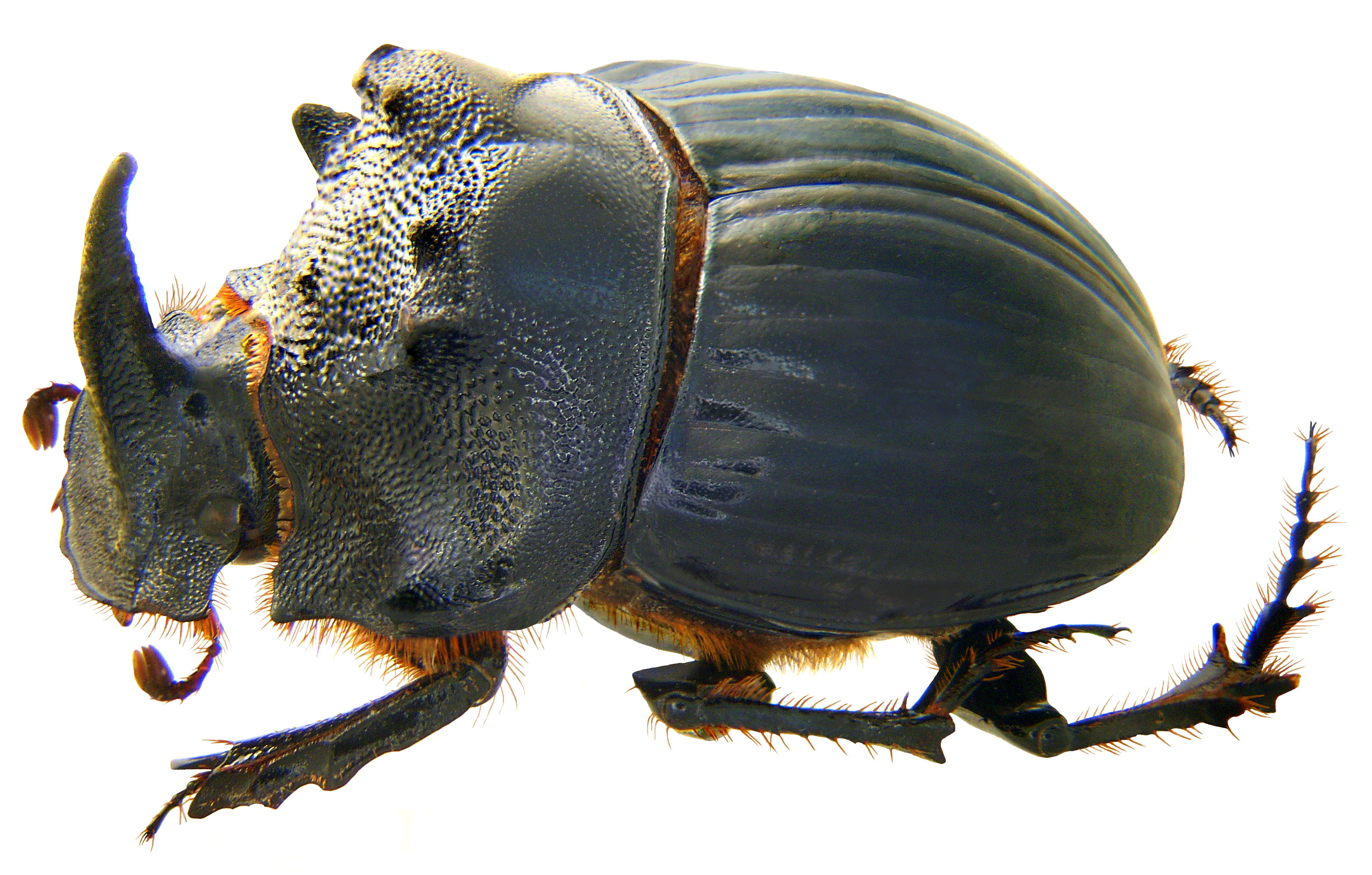
Copris elphenor male
- Deltochilini (= Canthonini) – about 120 genera including:
  - Anachalcos Hope, 1837
  - Canthon Hoffmannsegg, 1817
  - Circellium Latreille, 1825
  - Deltochilum
  - Dicranocara Frolov and Scholtz, 2003
  - Epirinus Reiche, 1841
  - Parachorius
  - Versicorpus Deschodt Davis and Scholtz, 2011
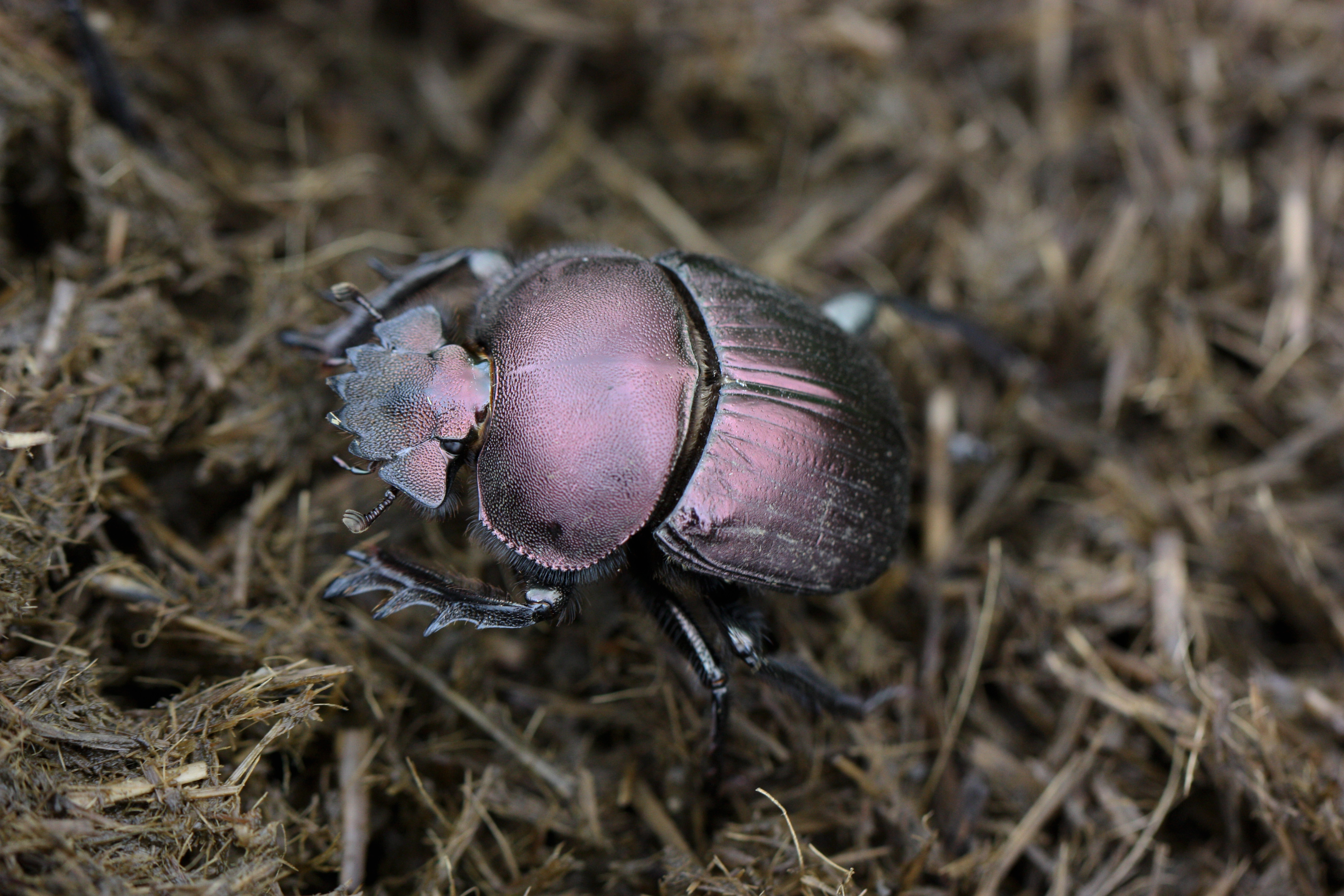
Anachalcos convexus

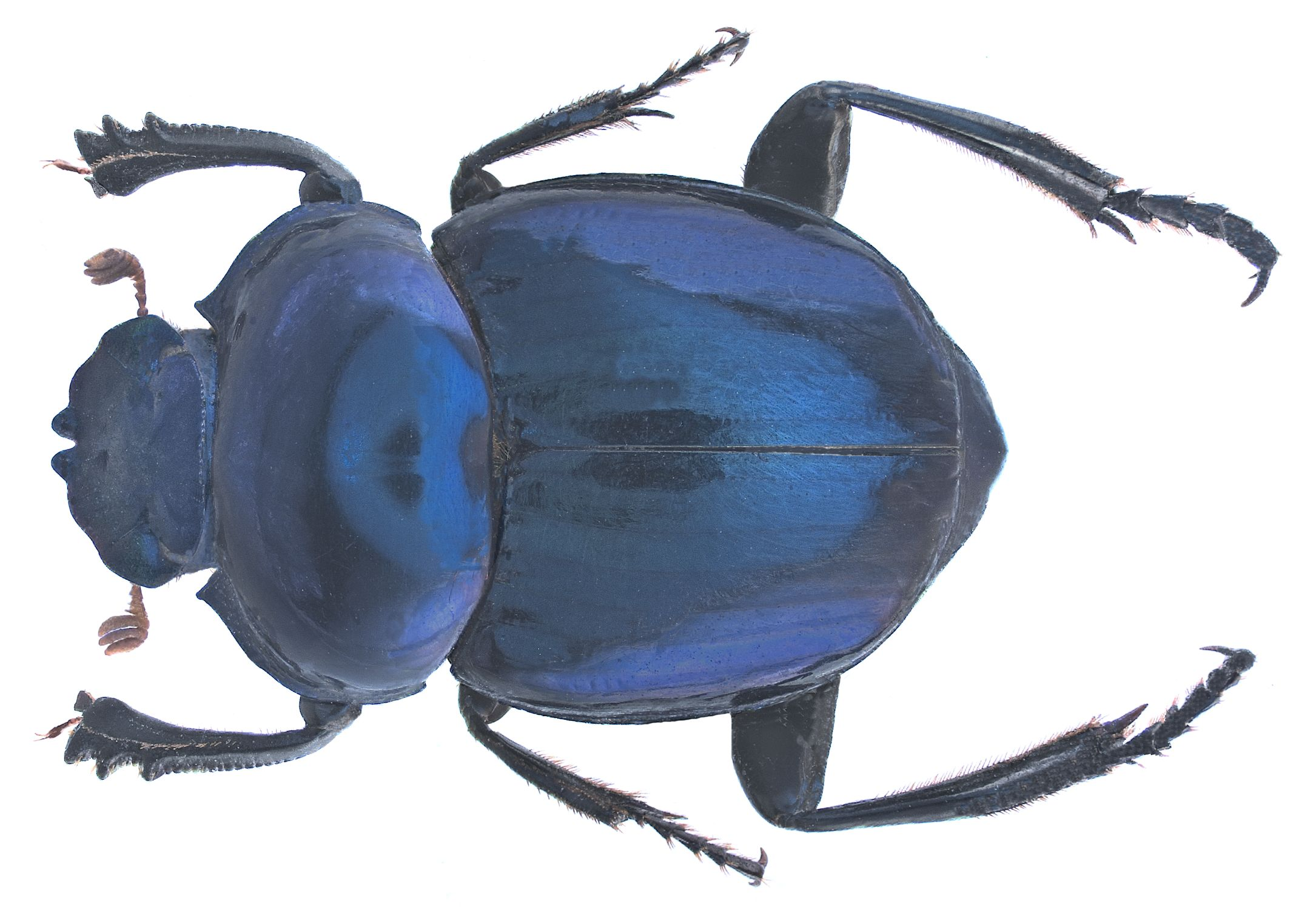
Canthon smaragdulus

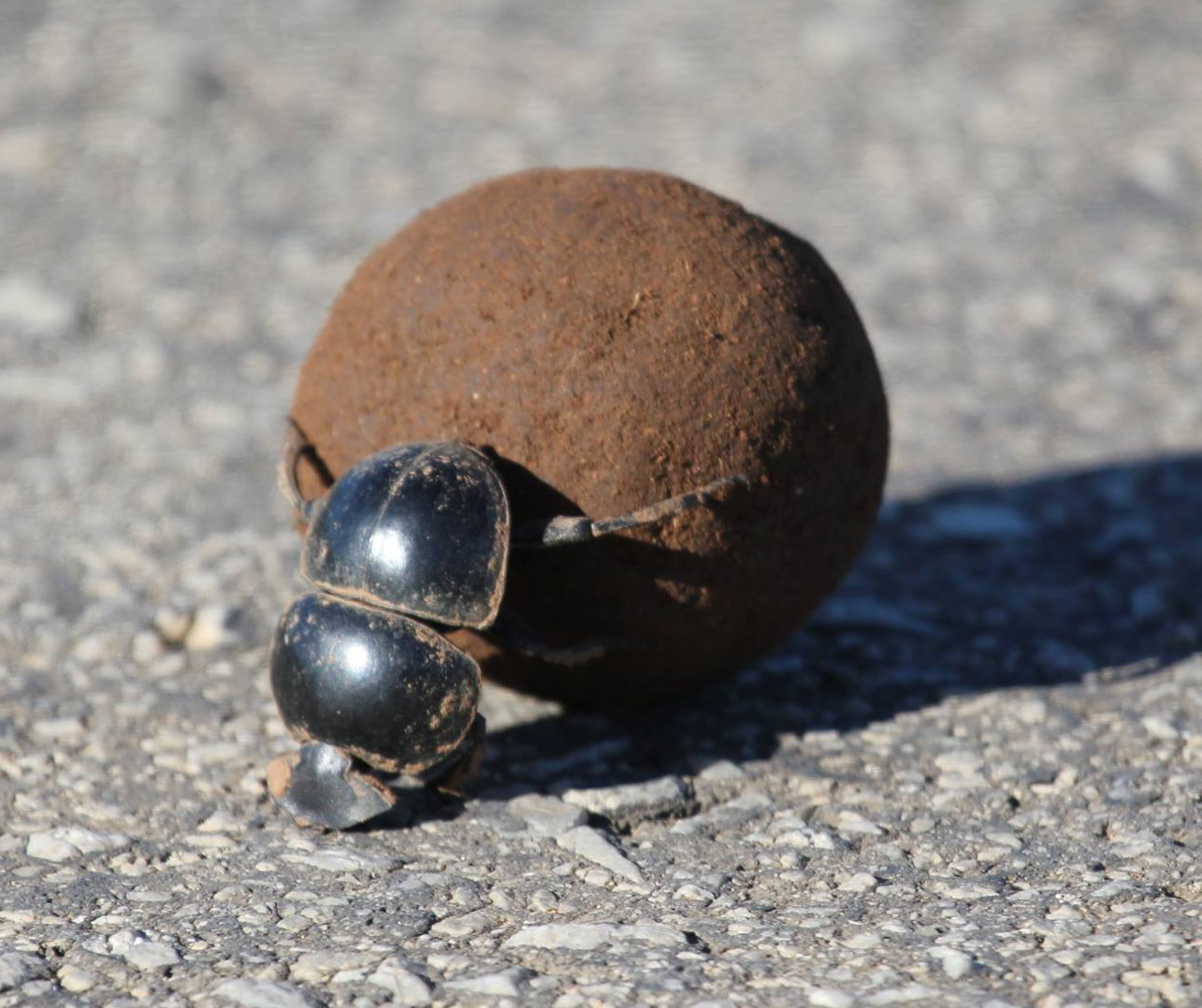
Circellium bacchus
- Onthophagini – about 40 genera including:
  - Hyalonthophagus
  - Onthophagus
  - Proagoderus
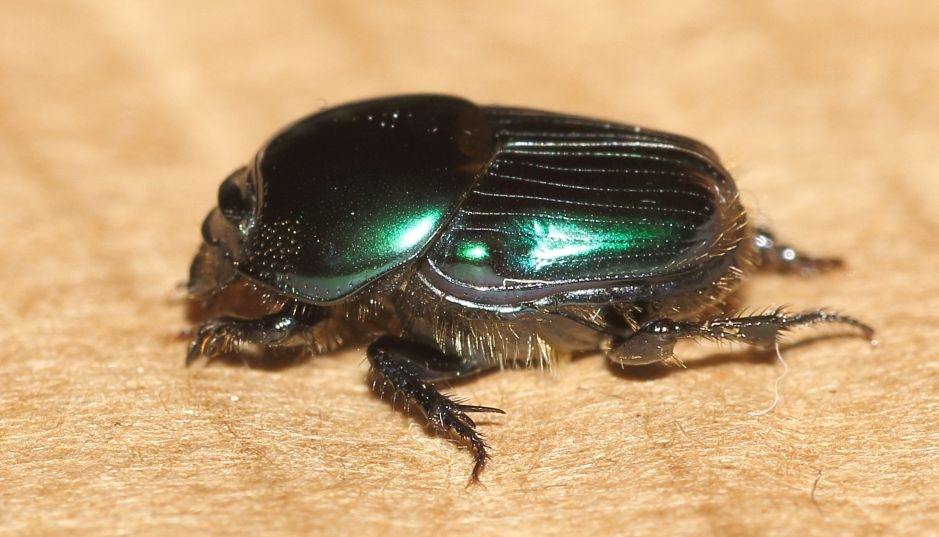
Hyalonthophagus alcyonides

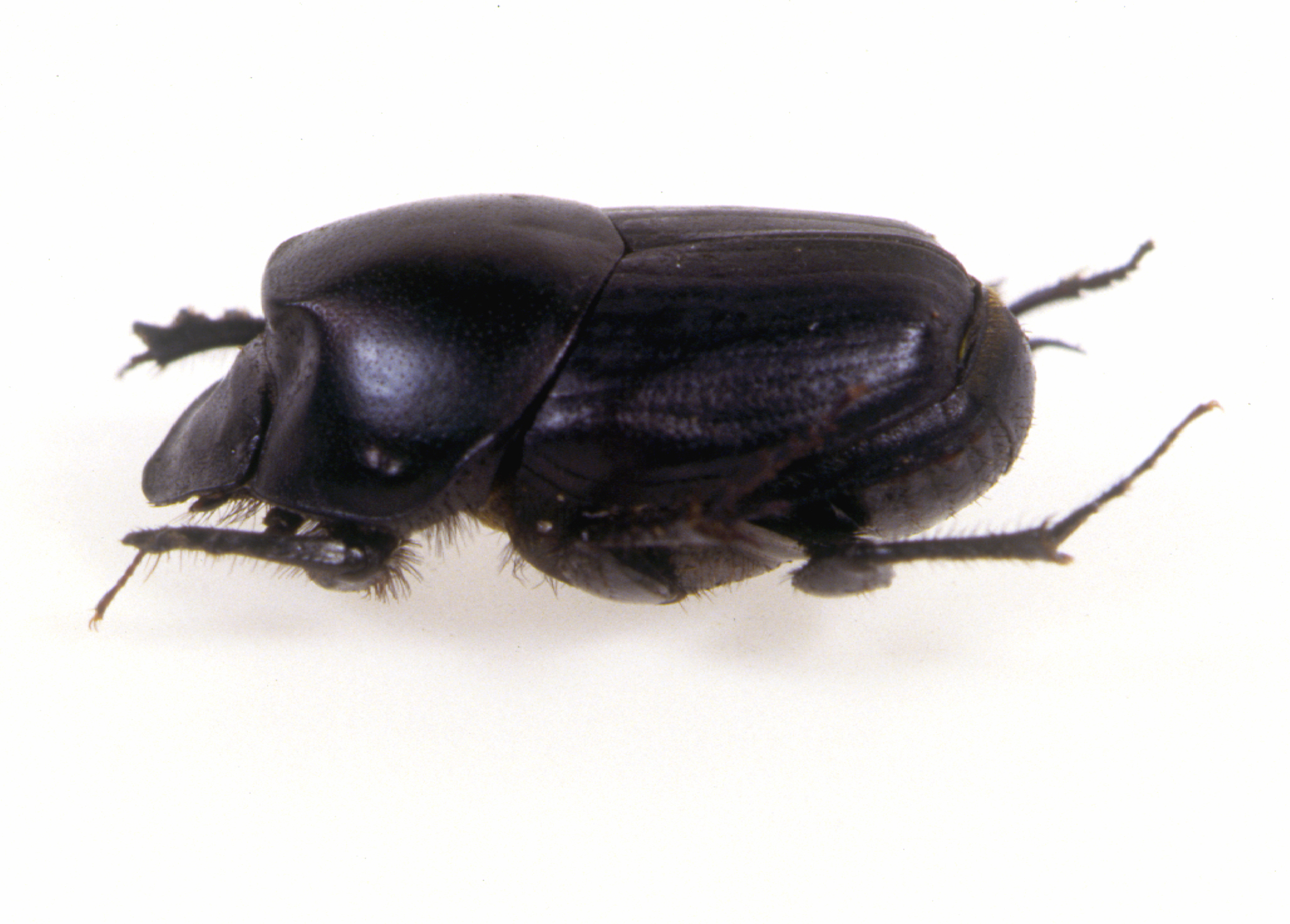
Onthophagus binodis

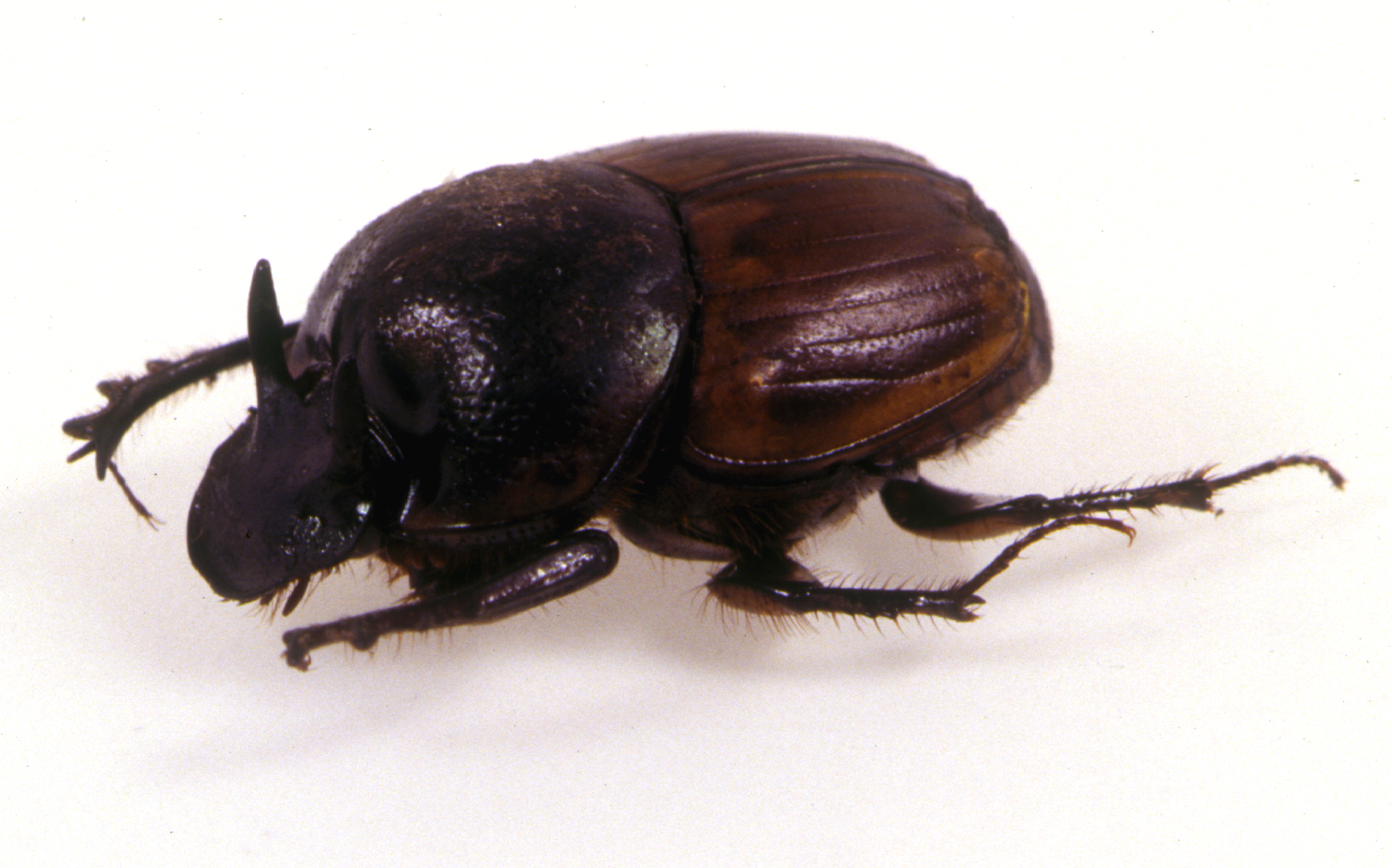
Onthophagus gazella

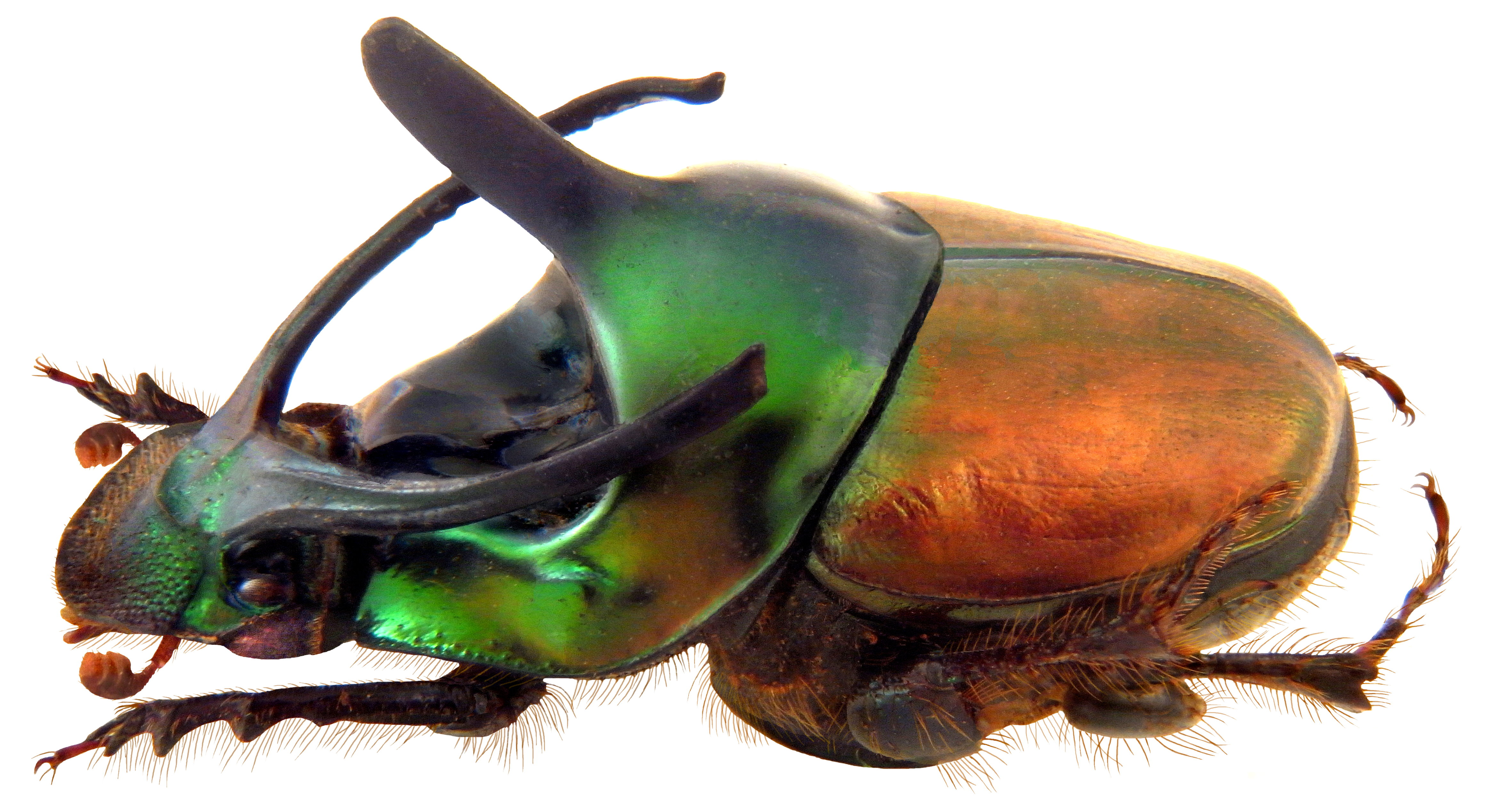
Proagoderus imperator

=== Predominantly Old World (New World presence likely represents rather recent dispersal) ===
- Oniticellini (incl. Eurysternini) – 16 genera including:
  - Euoniticellus Janssens, 1953
  - Oniticellus Serville, 1825
  - Eurysternus
- Sisyphini – three genera (sometimes placed in the Scarabaeini):
  - Nesosisyphus
  - Neosisyphus
  - Sisyphus

=== Old World ===
- Gymnopleurini – four genera (sometimes placed in the Scarabaeini):
  - Allogymnopleurus
  - Garreta Janssens, 1940
  - Gymnopleurus Illiger, 1803
  - Paragymnopleurus
- Scarabaeini – selected genera:
  - Scarabaeus (Kheper is a subgenus)
- Onitini – selected genera:
  - Bubas Mulsant, 1842
  - Cheironitis Lansberge, 1875
  - Onitis Fabricius, 1798
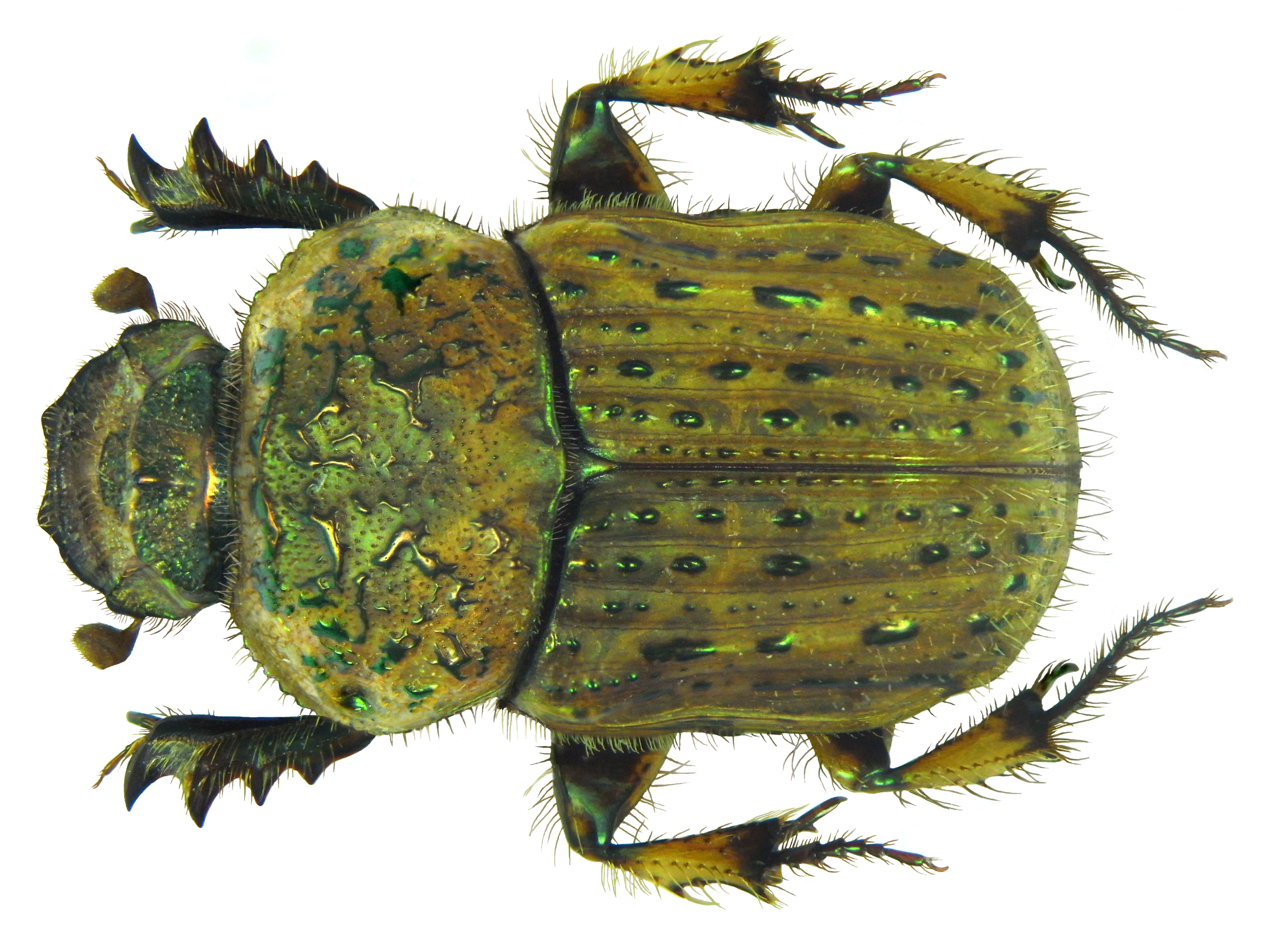
Cheironitis scabrosus

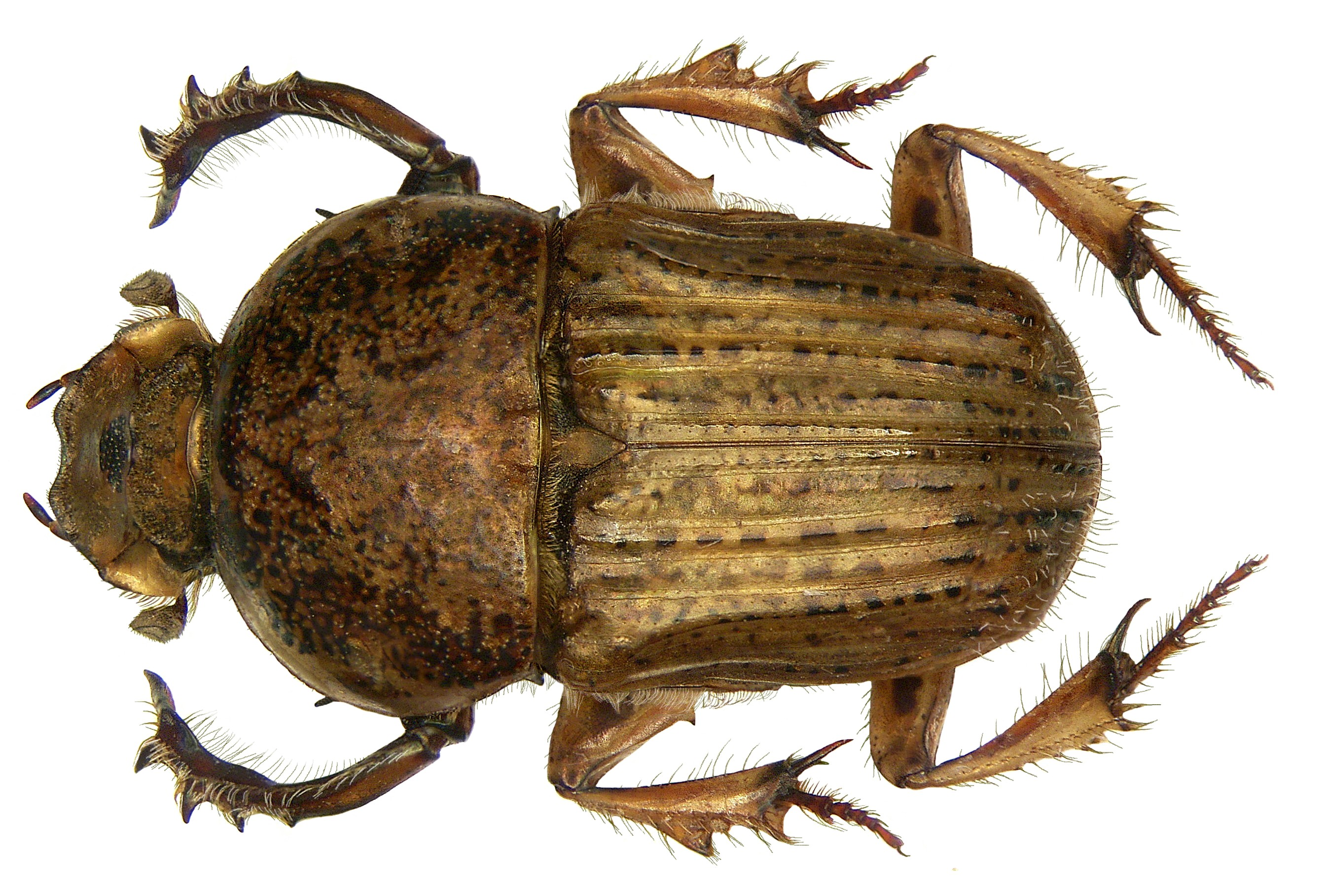
Chironitis indicus

=== New World ===
- Eucraniini – four genera:
  - Anomiopsoides
  - Ennearabdus
  - Eucranium
  - Glyphoderus
- Phanaeini – 12 genera including:
  - Oxysternon
  - Phanaeus
