= Falsignambia =

Scientific classification
- Kingdom: Animalia
- Phylum: Arthropoda
- Class: Insecta
- Order: Coleoptera
- Suborder: Polyphaga
- Infraorder: Scarabaeiformia
- Family: Scarabaeidae
- Subfamily: Scarabaeinae
- Genus: Falsignambia

Genus of beetles

Falsignambia is a genus of Scarabaeidae or scarab beetles in the superfamily Scarabaeoidea. The genus contains the species Falsignambia grandis (Paulian, 1987) which is recorded from Mount Panie in New Caledonia at an altitude of 950 metres.
