= Haroldius =

Scientific classification
- Kingdom: Animalia
- Phylum: Arthropoda
- Clade: Pancrustacea
- Class: Insecta
- Order: Coleoptera
- Suborder: Polyphaga
- Infraorder: Scarabaeiformia
- Family: Scarabaeidae
- Subfamily: Scarabaeinae
- Tribe: Ateuchini
- Genus: Haroldius; Boucomont, 1914

Synonyms
- Afroharoldius; Formicdubius

Genus of beetles

Haroldius is a genus of scarab beetles in the family Scarabaeidae. There are more than 30 described species in Haroldius. They are found in Asia, Africa, and Oceania.

== Species ==
These 39 species belong to the genus Haroldius:

- Haroldius annandalei (Silvestri, 1924) (India)
- Haroldius borneensis Paulian, 1993 (Malaysia)
- Haroldius brendelli Krikken & Huijbregts, 2009 (Indonesia)
- Haroldius cambeforti Krikken & Huijbregts, 2006 (Indonesia)
- Haroldius cardoni Boucomont, 1923 (India)
- Haroldius celebensis Krikken & Huijbregts, 2006 (Indonesia)
- Haroldius convexus (Philips & Scholtz, 2000) (Republic South Africa)
- Haroldius discoidalis Paulian, 1993 (Malaysia)
- Haroldius ennearthrus (Janssens, 1949) (Republic Democratic Congo)
- Haroldius fairmairei Boucomont, 1914 (Singapore)
- Haroldius fleutiauxi Paulian, 1945 (Vietnam, Thailand)
- Haroldius globosus Boucomont, 1925 (Philippines)
- Haroldius heimi (Wasmann, 1918) (India, Pakistan, Nepal)
- Haroldius herrenorum Paulian, 1985 (Sri Lanka)
- Haroldius hwangi Masumoto, Lee & Ochi, 2005 (Taiwan and temperate Asia)
- Haroldius jechaer Král & Hájek, 2012 (China)
- Haroldius kawadai Masumoto, 1995 (Thailand)
- Haroldius kolaka Krikken & Huijbregts, 2006 (Indonesia)
- Haroldius krali (Utsunomiya & Masumoto, 2000) (Sri Lanka)
- Haroldius lassallei Cambefort, 1986 (Nepal)
- Haroldius leleupi (Janssens, 1953) (Republic Democratic Congo)
- Haroldius loebli Paulian, 1987 (Thailand)
- Haroldius lyleae Daniel, Strümpher & Snäll, 2021 (Republic South Africa)
- Haroldius maruyamai Utsunomiya & Masumoto, 2005 (Malaysia)
- Haroldius modestus (Janssens, 1953) (Afrotropical)
- Haroldius oharai Ochi, Kon & Barclay, 2009 (Indonesia)
- Haroldius pahangensis Král, 2003 (Malaysia)
- Haroldius pauliani Scheuern, 1995 (Malaysia)
- Haroldius penelopae Krikken & Huijbregts, 2006 (Indonesia)
- Haroldius perroti Paulian, 1939 (Southeast and temperate Asia)
- Haroldius philippinensis Pereira, 1954 (Philippines)
- Haroldius rugatulus Boucomont, 1914 (Singapore, Malaysia)
- Haroldius stefanii Montreuil, 2010 (Madagascar)
- Haroldius stevensi Arrow, 1931 (India, Nepal)
- Haroldius sumatranus Paulian & Scheuern, 1994 (Indonesia)
- Haroldius tangkoko Krikken & Huijbregts, 2006 (Indonesia)
- Haroldius thailandensis Paulian & Scheuern, 1994 (Thailand)
- Haroldius turnai Král, 2003 (China)
- Haroldius uenoi Masumoto & Yin, 1993 (China)
