= Parachorius =

Scientific classification
- Domain: Eukaryota
- Kingdom: Animalia
- Phylum: Arthropoda
- Class: Insecta
- Order: Coleoptera
- Suborder: Polyphaga
- Infraorder: Scarabaeiformia
- Superfamily: Scarabaeoidea
- Family: Scarabaeidae
- Subfamily: Scarabaeinae
- Genus: Parachorius; Harold, 1873

Synonyms
- Cassolus

Genus of beetles

Parachorius is a genus of Asian Scarabaeidae or scarab beetles.

== Species ==
BioLib lists:

1. Parachorius asymmetricus Tarasov, 2017
2. Parachorius bolavensis Tarasov, 2017
3. Parachorius fukiensis (Balthasar, 1960)
4. Parachorius fungorum Kryzhanovsky & Medvedev, 1966
5. Parachorius globosus Arrow, 1931
6. Parachorius gotoi (Masumoto, 1986)
7. Parachorius hookeri Arrow, 1931
8. Parachorius humeralis (Arrow, 1907)
9. Parachorius javanus (Boucomont, 1914)
10. Parachorius longipenis Tarasov, 2017
11. Parachorius maruyamai Masumoto, Ochi & Sakchoowong, 2012
12. Parachorius matsudai Ochi, Pham & Kon, 2016
13. Parachorius newthayerae Tarasov, 2017
14. Parachorius nudus (Sharp, 1875)
15. Parachorius peninsularis (Arrow, 1907)
16. Parachorius pseudojavanus Tarasov, 2017
17. Parachorius schuelkei Tarasov, 2017
18. Parachorius semsanganus Tarasov & Keith, 2011
19. Parachorius solodovnikovi Tarasov, 2017
20. Parachorius thomsoni Harold, 1873
