= Eurysternus =

Scientific classification
- Kingdom: Animalia
- Phylum: Arthropoda
- Class: Insecta
- Order: Coleoptera
- Suborder: Polyphaga
- Infraorder: Scarabaeiformia
- Family: Scarabaeidae
- Tribe: Oniticellini
- Genus: Eurysternus; Dalman, 1824

Synonyms
- Aeschrotes; Eurysternodes

Genus of beetles

Eurysternus is a genus of Scarabaeinae or dung beetles in the family Scarabaeidae. It is normally placed in the Oniticellini, although some authors consider it the single genus in the tribe Eurysternini (e.g.). It is restricted to the Neotropics and includes 53 recognized species.

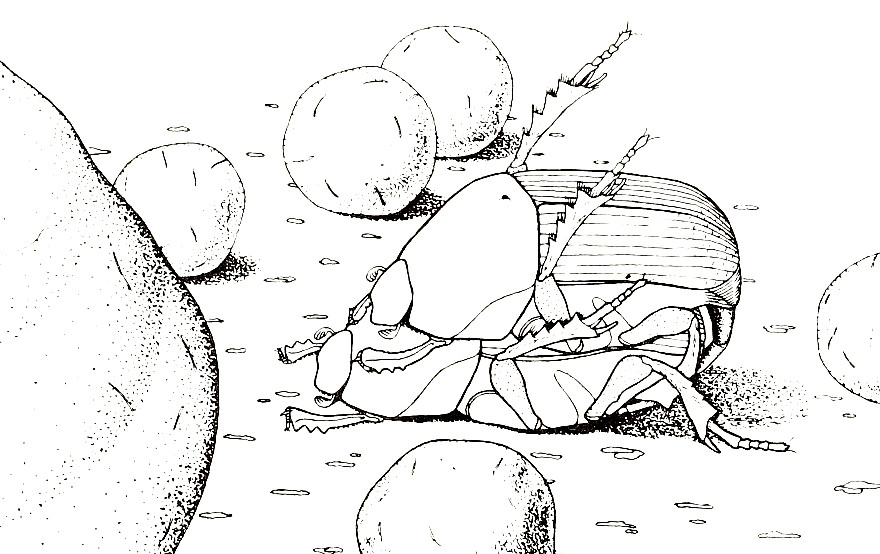
Copulation of Eurysternus caribaeus

They have a characteristic nesting strategy among dung beetles, with brood ball elaboration but no ball rolling behaviour.

The species in the genus are present from Mexico to Argentina, but highest diversity is found the Amazon basin, the Andes and Central America. Species distribution is affected primarily by annual mean temperature and annual precipitation. The species with wide climatic niches would primarily inhabit the rainiest and coldest locations in the continent.
