= Anoplognatho =

Scientific classification
- Domain: Eukaryota
- Kingdom: Animalia
- Phylum: Arthropoda
- Class: Insecta
- Order: Coleoptera
- Suborder: Polyphaga
- Infraorder: Scarabaeiformia
- Family: Scarabaeidae
- Subfamily: Dynastinae
- Tribe: Pentodontini
- Genus: Anoplognatho; Rivers, 1888
- Species: A. dunnianus

Binomial name
- Anoplognatho dunnianus Rivers, 1888

Synonyms
- Aphonides Rivers, 1889

Genus of beetles

Anoplognatho is a genus of rhinoceros beetles in the family Scarabaeidae. There is one described species in Anoplognatho, A. dunnianus.
