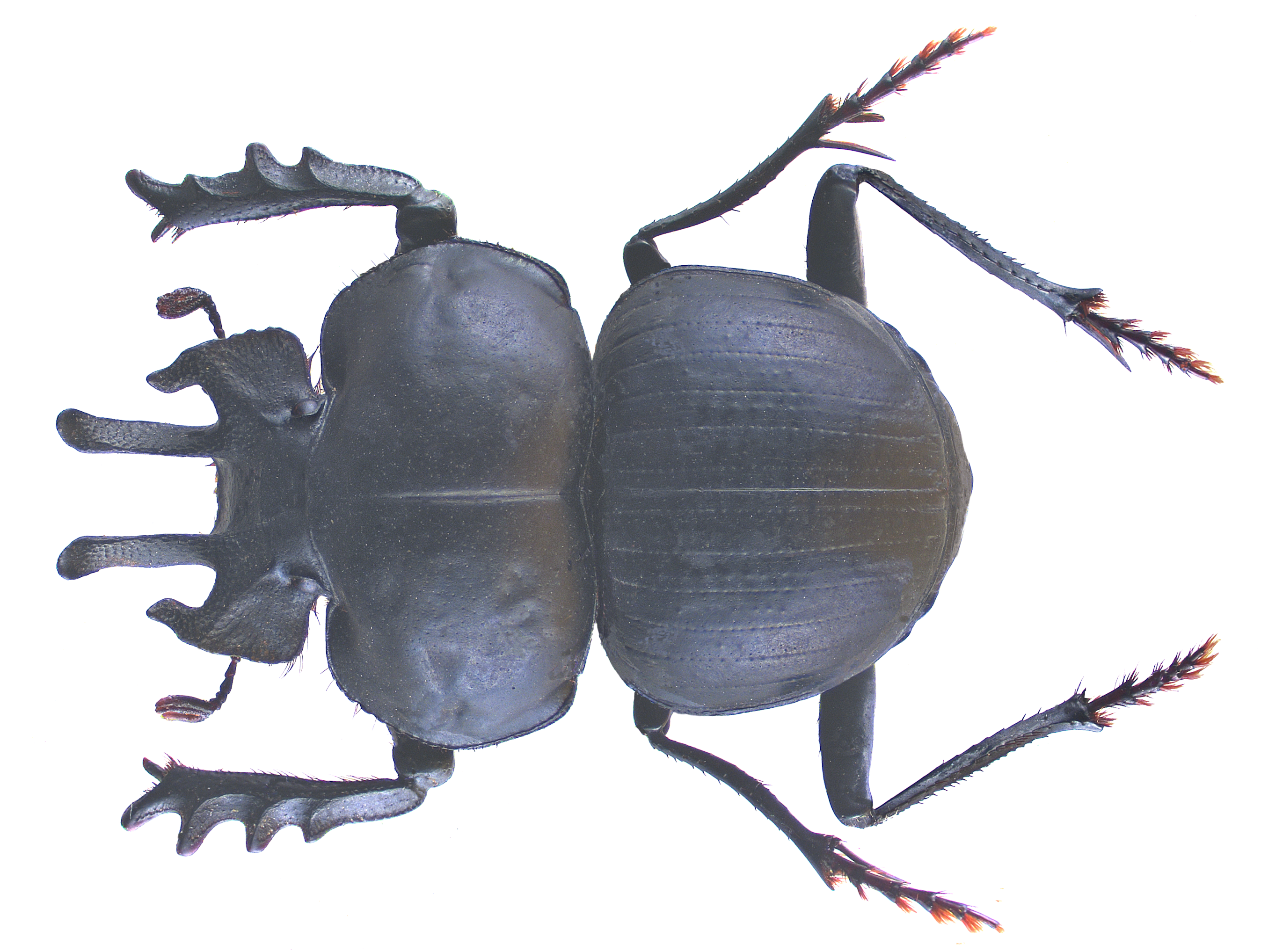
- Anomiopsoides heteroclyta

Scientific classification
- Kingdom: Animalia
- Phylum: Arthropoda
- Class: Insecta
- Order: Coleoptera
- Suborder: Polyphaga
- Infraorder: Scarabaeiformia
- Family: Scarabaeidae
- Subfamily: Scarabaeinae
- Tribe: Eucraniini
- Genus: Anomiopsoides; Blackwelder, 1944

Synonyms
- Anomiopsis Burmeister, 1861

= Anomiopsoides =

Genus of beetles

Anomiopsoides is a genus of scarab beetles in the family Scarabaeidae. There are at least four described species in the genus Anomiopsoides and are found in Argentina.

== Species ==
These four species belong to the genus Anomiopsoides:

- Anomiopsoides biloba (Burmeister, 1861)
- Anomiopsoides cavifrons (Burmeister, 1861)
- Anomiopsoides fedemariai Ocampo, 2007
- Anomiopsoides heteroclyta (Blanchard, 1845)
