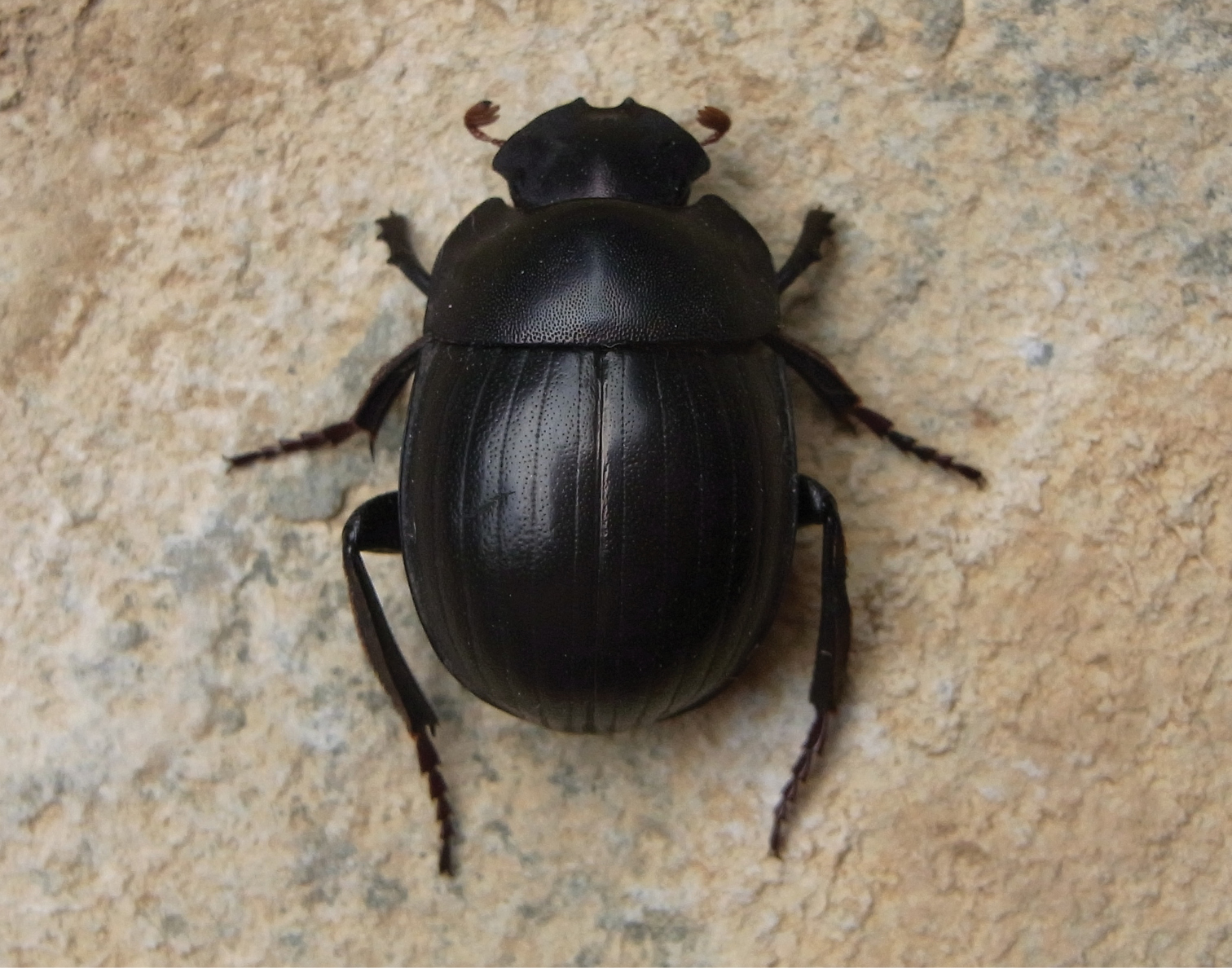
- Gyronotus perissinottoi in its natural habitat at the Umthamvuna Nature Reserve

Scientific classification
- Kingdom: Animalia
- Phylum: Arthropoda
- Class: Insecta
- Order: Coleoptera
- Suborder: Polyphaga
- Infraorder: Scarabaeiformia
- Family: Scarabaeidae
- Subfamily: Scarabaeinae
- Genus: Acanthonitis

= Acanthonitis =

Genus of beetles

Acanthonitis is a genus of Scarabaeidae or scarab beetles in the superfamily Scarabaeoidea.
