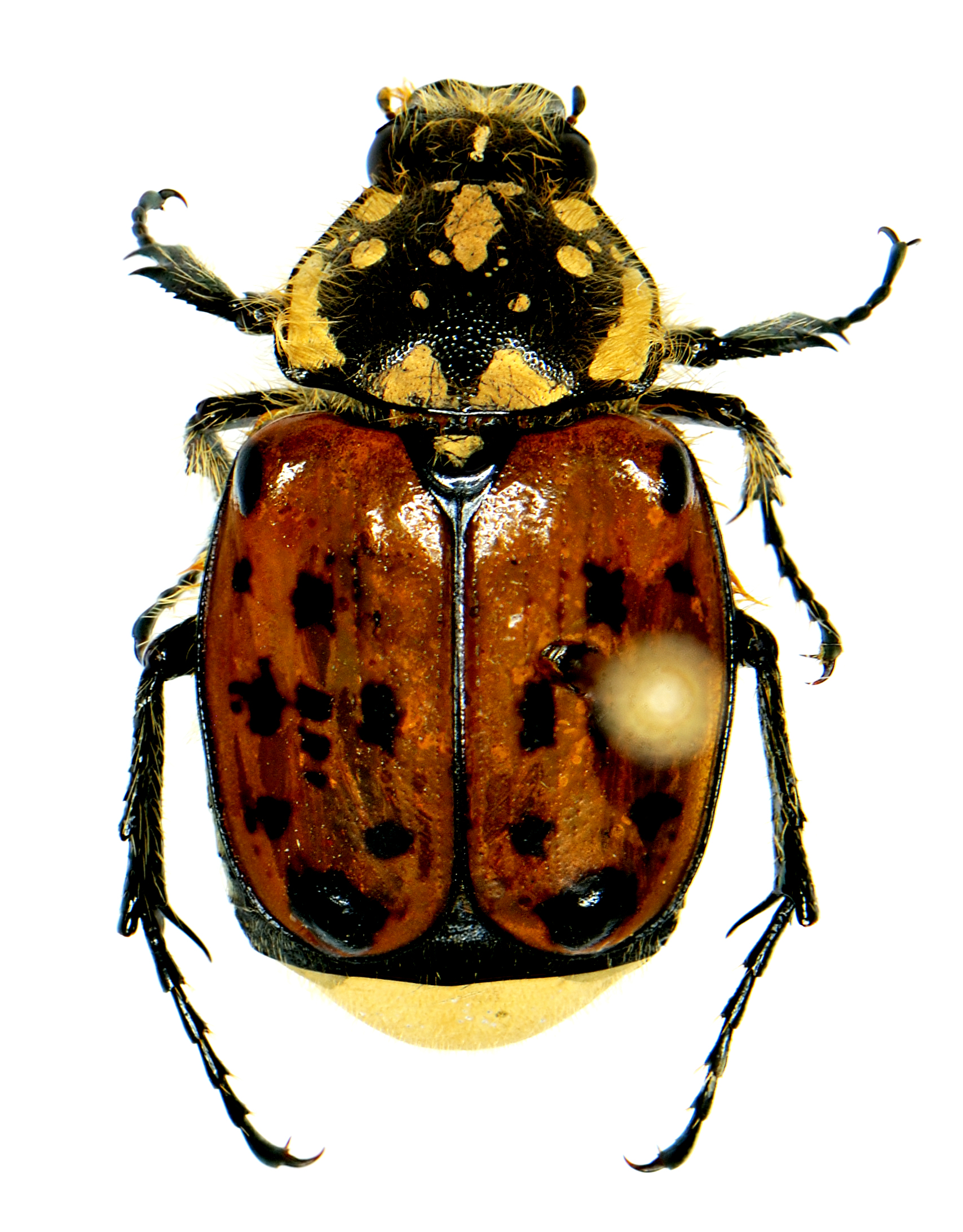
- Holotype

Scientific classification
- Kingdom: Animalia
- Phylum: Arthropoda
- Clade: Pancrustacea
- Class: Insecta
- Order: Coleoptera
- Suborder: Polyphaga
- Infraorder: Scarabaeiformia
- Family: Scarabaeidae
- Subfamily: Cetoniinae
- Genus: Gnorimella; Casey, 1915
- Species: G. maculosa

Binomial name
- Gnorimella maculosa (Knoch, 1801)

Synonyms
- Cetonia maculosa Knoch, 1801; Gnorimus dissimilis Gory & Percheron, 1833; Trichius bigsbii Kirby, 1827

= Gnorimella =

Genus of beetles

Gnorimella is a genus of uncommon scarab beetle in the family Scarabaeidae. There is only one species in this genus, Gnorimella maculosa, also known as the maculate flower scarab. Its name refers to its spotted (maculate) patterning. It is 15.2 mm in length. This species prefers a habitat close to deciduous woodland, where it sometimes buzzes around dogwood or viburnum flowers. It can be found in eastern North America.
