= Coprophanaeoides =

Scientific classification
- Kingdom: Animalia
- Phylum: Arthropoda
- Clade: Pancrustacea
- Class: Insecta
- Order: Coleoptera
- Suborder: Polyphaga
- Infraorder: Scarabaeiformia
- Family: Scarabaeidae
- Genus: Coprophanaeoides

Genus of beetles

Coprophanaeoides is a genus of Scarabaeidae, more commonly known as scarab beetles.

Known species are:

Coprophanaeoides bahianus

Coprophanaeoides hirticollis

Coprophanaeoides refulgens
