= Warwickia =

Scientific classification
- Kingdom: Animalia
- Phylum: Arthropoda
- Clade: Pancrustacea
- Class: Insecta
- Order: Coleoptera
- Suborder: Polyphaga
- Infraorder: Scarabaeiformia
- Family: Scarabaeidae
- Subfamily: Melolonthinae
- Tribe: Tanyproctini
- Genus: Warwickia; Smith & Evans, 2005
- Species: W. pilosa

Binomial name
- Warwickia pilosa (Sanderson, 1939)

Synonyms
- Benedictia Sanderson, 1939 (Homonym)

Genus of beetles

Warwickia is a genus of May beetles and junebugs in the family Scarabaeidae, containing one described species, Warwickia pilosa. This genus was described in 2005 by Andrew Smith and Arthur Evans.
