= Eurypodea =

Scientific classification
- Kingdom: Animalia
- Phylum: Arthropoda
- Class: Insecta
- Order: Coleoptera
- Suborder: Polyphaga
- Infraorder: Scarabaeiformia
- Family: Scarabaeidae
- Genus: Eurypodea

Genus of beetles

Eurypodea is a genus of Scarabaeidae or scarab beetles.
