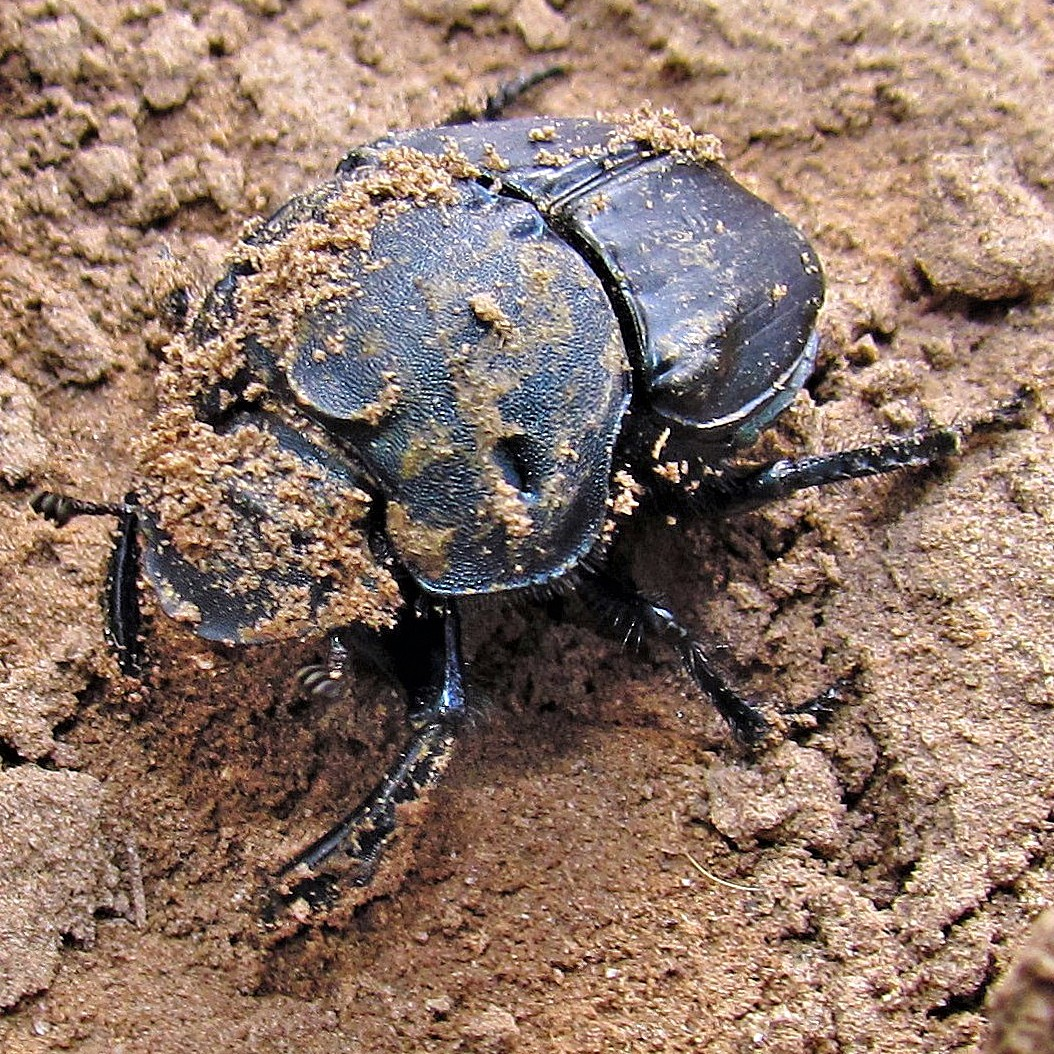

Scientific classification
- Kingdom: Animalia
- Phylum: Arthropoda
- Class: Insecta
- Order: Coleoptera
- Suborder: Polyphaga
- Infraorder: Scarabaeiformia
- Family: Scarabaeidae
- Genus: Bolbites

= Bolbites =

Genus of beetles

Bolbites is a genus of Scarabaeidae or scarab beetles in the superfamily Scarabaeoidea. The genus is generally considered to be monospecific, including only Bolbites onitoides Harold, 1868, a polychromatic species living in open habitats and shrublands from Bolivia and Paraguay to Argentina, southern Brazil and Uruguay. Although it was suggested that B. onitoides might actually represent two distinct subspecies based on dorsal colouration, a 2022 study concluded that the B. onnitoides should continue to be considered a single monotypic species.
