= List of Rhyssemus species =

This is a list of 167 species in Rhyssemus, a genus of aphodiine dung beetles in the family Scarabaeidae.

== Rhyssemus species ==
- Rhyssemus africanus Petrovitz, 1963^{c g}
- Rhyssemus ahrensi Rakovic & Kral, 2001^{c g}
- Rhyssemus algiricus Lucas, 1846^{c g}
- Rhyssemus alluaudi Clouet, 1901^{c g}
- Rhyssemus ambovombensis Pittino, 1990^{c g}
- Rhyssemus amplicollis Pittino, 1984^{c g}
- Rhyssemus andreinii Pittino, 1984^{c g}
- Rhyssemus annaedicatus Pierotti, 1980^{c g}
- Rhyssemus archambaulti Bénard, 1929^{c g}
- Rhyssemus aspericollis Petrovitz, 1965^{c g}
- Rhyssemus asperocostatus Fairmaire, 1892^{c g}
- Rhyssemus atramentarius Péringuey, 1901^{c g}
- Rhyssemus aurivillii Clouet, 1901^{c g}
- Rhyssemus bacchusi Pittino, 1984^{c g}
- Rhyssemus balteatus Petrovitz, 1966^{c g}
- Rhyssemus bechuanus Petrovitz, 1956^{c g}
- Rhyssemus bedeli Clouet, 1901^{c g}
- Rhyssemus berytensis Marseul, 1878^{c g}
- Rhyssemus bilyi Rakovic, 2001^{c g}
- Rhyssemus biovatus Clouet, 1901^{c g}
- Rhyssemus birmensis Clouet, 1901^{c g}
- Rhyssemus blackburnei Clouet, 1901^{c g}
- Rhyssemus bordati Pittino, 1984^{c g}
- Rhyssemus brevis Pittino, 1990^{c g}
- Rhyssemus brevitarsis Pittino, 1984^{c g}
- Rhyssemus brownwoodi Gordon and Cartwright, 1980^{i c g}
- Rhyssemus bucciarellii Pittino, 1990^{c g}
- Rhyssemus buettikeri Pittino, 1984^{c g}
- Rhyssemus bufonis Boucomont, 1935^{c g}
- Rhyssemus californicus Horn, 1871^{i c g}
- Rhyssemus canaliculatus Clement, 1969^{c g}
- Rhyssemus cantabricus Balthasar, 1961^{c g}
- Rhyssemus capensis Clouet, 1901^{c g}
- Rhyssemus carinatipennis Péringuey, 1901^{c g}
- Rhyssemus carinatus Pittino, 1984^{c g}
- Rhyssemus chinensis Pittino, 1996^{c g}
- Rhyssemus convexus Bénard, 1911^{c g}
- Rhyssemus crispus Schmidt, 1916^{c g}
- Rhyssemus decellei Pittino, 1984^{c g}
- Rhyssemus descarpentriesi Pittino, 1990^{c g}
- Rhyssemus dispar Pittino, 1990^{c g}
- Rhyssemus endroedyyoungai Petrovitz, 1975^{c g}
- Rhyssemus evae Endrödi, 1964^{c g}
- Rhyssemus exaratus Marseul, 1878^{c g}
- Rhyssemus fairmairei Clouet, 1901^{c g}
- Rhyssemus falcatus Petrovitz, 1961^{c g}
- Rhyssemus feae Clouet, 1901^{c g}
- Rhyssemus ferenczi Endrödi, 1976^{c g}
- Rhyssemus frankenbergeri Balthasar, 1942^{c g}
- Rhyssemus franzi Petrovitz, 1963^{c g}
- Rhyssemus freudei Balthasar, 1960^{c g}
- Rhyssemus freyi Petrovitz, 1963^{c g}
- Rhyssemus germanus (Linnaeus, 1767)^{i c g b}
- Rhyssemus gestroi Clouet, 1901^{c g}
- Rhyssemus ghanaensis Petrovitz, 1975^{c g}
- Rhyssemus goudoti Harold, 1868^{c g}
- Rhyssemus granosus (Klug & Erichson, 1842)^{c g}
- Rhyssemus granulosocostatus Clouet, 1901^{c g}
- Rhyssemus granulosus Ballion, 1871^{c g}
- Rhyssemus grossepunctatus Balthasar, 1961^{c g}
- Rhyssemus guineensis Petrovitz, 1969^{c g}
- Rhyssemus haafi Petrovitz, 1964^{c g}
- Rhyssemus hamatus Petrovitz, 1963^{c g}
- Rhyssemus haroldi Clouet, 1901^{c g}
- Rhyssemus hauseri Balthasar, 1933^{c g}
- Rhyssemus helenae Pittino, 1983^{c g}
- Rhyssemus histrio Balthasar, 1961^{c g}
- Rhyssemus histrioides Petrovitz, 1963^{c g}
- Rhyssemus horni Clouet, 1901^{c g}
- Rhyssemus hottentottus Petrovitz, 1963^{c g}
- Rhyssemus imitator Pittino, 1990^{c g}
- Rhyssemus indicus Clouet, 1901^{c g}
- Rhyssemus inermis Clouet, 1901^{c g}
- Rhyssemus infidus Pittino, 1984^{c g}
- Rhyssemus inscitus (Walker, 1858)^{c g}
- Rhyssemus insularis Pittino, 1983^{c g}
- Rhyssemus interruptus Reitter, 1892^{c g}
- Rhyssemus karnatakaensis Pittino, 1984^{c g}
- Rhyssemus keisseri Bénard, 1910^{c g}
- Rhyssemus koreanus Stebnicka, 1980^{c g}
- Rhyssemus laevinasus Petrovitz, 1964^{c g}
- Rhyssemus lamyensis Petrovitz, 1963^{c g}
- Rhyssemus laoticus Pittino, Rakovic & Mencl, 2013^{c g}
- Rhyssemus limbolarius Petrovitz, 1963^{c g}
- Rhyssemus linnavuorii Balthasar, 1972^{c g}
- Rhyssemus loebli Petrovitz, 1975^{c g}
- Rhyssemus macedonicus Bénard, 1923^{c g}
- Rhyssemus madagassus Harold, 1879^{c g}
- Rhyssemus maximus Clouet, 1901^{c g}
- Rhyssemus mayeti Clouet, 1901^{c g}
- Rhyssemus meridionalis Reitter, 1890^{c g}
- Rhyssemus marqueti Reiche, 1863
- Rhyssemus meruensis Pittino, 1983^{c g}
- Rhyssemus mesopotamicus Petrovitz, 1963^{c g}
- Rhyssemus mexicanus Hinton, 1934^{c g}
- Rhyssemus mimus Balthasar, 1961^{c g}
- Rhyssemus mirus Petrovitz, 1967^{c g}
- Rhyssemus morgani Bénard, 1911^{c g}
- Rhyssemus murghabensis (Balthasar, 1967)^{c g}
- Rhyssemus namorokae Pittino, 1990^{c g}
- Rhyssemus nanshanchicus Masumoto, 1977^{c g}
- Rhyssemus neglectus Brown, 1929^{i c g}
- Rhyssemus nitidus Petrovitz, 1972^{c g}
- Rhyssemus obliviosus Petrovitz, 1963^{c g}
- Rhyssemus olympiae Pittino, 1990^{c g}
- Rhyssemus osmanlis Koshantschikov, 1916^{c g}
- Rhyssemus parallelicollis Clouet, 1901^{c g}
- Rhyssemus parallelus Reitter, 1892^{c g}
- Rhyssemus pauliani Pittino, 1990^{c g}
- Rhyssemus pectoralis Clouet, 1901^{c g}
- Rhyssemus perissinottoi Pittino, 1983^{c g}
- Rhyssemus perlatus Petrovitz, 1975^{c g}
- Rhyssemus pertinax Balthasar, 1961^{c g}
- Rhyssemus peyrierasi Pittino, 1990^{c g}
- Rhyssemus pfefferi Balthasar, 1972^{c g}
- Rhyssemus plicatus (Germar, 1817)^{c g}
- Rhyssemus polycolpus Fairmaire, 1886^{c g}
- Rhyssemus pondoensis Petrovitz, 1967^{c g}
- Rhyssemus ponticus Petrovitz, 1962^{c g}
- Rhyssemus procerus Petrovitz, 1973^{c g}
- Rhyssemus promontorii Péringuey, 1901^{c g}
- Rhyssemus propinquus Petrovitz, 1964^{c g}
- Rhyssemus psammobiiformis Petrovitz, 1963^{c g}
- Rhyssemus punctatissimus Pittino, 1984^{c g}
- Rhyssemus puncticollis Brown, 1929^{c g}
- Rhyssemus punctiventris Balthasar, 1961^{c g}
- Rhyssemus purkynei Balthasar, 1961^{c g}
- Rhyssemus rajasthani Rakovic, Mencl & Kral, 2017^{c g}
- Rhyssemus relegatus Balthasar, 1965^{c g}
- Rhyssemus ressli Petrovitz, 1965^{c g}
- Rhyssemus ritsemae Clouet, 1901^{c g}
- Rhyssemus rohani Bénard, 1920^{c g}
- Rhyssemus rotschildi Bénard, 1909^{c g}
- Rhyssemus rubeolus Harold, 1871^{c g}
- Rhyssemus saldaitisi Rakovic, Kral & Mencl, 2016^{c g}
- Rhyssemus saoudi Pittino, 1984^{c g}
- Rhyssemus sardous Pierotti, 1980^{c g}
- Rhyssemus scaber Haldeman, 1848^{i c g b}
- Rhyssemus scabrosus Pittino, 1990^{c g}
- Rhyssemus schaeuffelei Petrovitz, 1964^{c g}
- Rhyssemus sculptilipennis Schmidt, 1916^{c g}
- Rhyssemus seineri Petrovitz, 1969^{c g}
- Rhyssemus senegalensis Petrovitz, 1972^{c g}
- Rhyssemus sexcostatus Schmidt, 1909^{c g}
- Rhyssemus similis Petrovitz, 1963^{c g}
- Rhyssemus sinuaticollis Pittino, 1984^{c g}
- Rhyssemus sonatus LeConte, 1881^{i c g b}
- Rhyssemus spangleri Gordon & Cartwright, 1980^{c g}
- Rhyssemus spiniger Pittino, 1983^{c g}
- Rhyssemus subdolus Balthasar, 1961^{c g}
- Rhyssemus sulcatus (Olivier, 1789)^{c g}
- Rhyssemus syriacus Petrovitz, 1971^{c g}
- Rhyssemus testudo Pittino, 1990^{c g}
- Rhyssemus thailandicus Pittino, 1996^{c g}
- Rhyssemus thomasi Endrödi, 1964^{c g}
- Rhyssemus tristis Petrovitz, 1969^{c g}
- Rhyssemus trisulcatus Petrovitz, 1956^{c g}
- Rhyssemus tschadensis Petrovitz, 1963^{c g}
- Rhyssemus tsihombensis Pittino, 1990^{c g}
- Rhyssemus tuberculicollis Petrovitz, 1965^{c g}
- Rhyssemus uncispinis Pittino, 1984^{c g}
- Rhyssemus vaulogeri Clouet, 1901^{c g}
- Rhyssemus verrucosus Mulsant, 1842^{c g}
- Rhyssemus villosus Pittino, 1990^{c g}
- Rhyssemus vinodolensis Petrovitz, 1963^{c g}
- Rhyssemus waboniensis Petrovitz, 1964^{c g}
- Rhyssemus xerxes Pittino, 1983^{c g}
- Rhyssemus zumpti Petrovitz, 1956^{c g}

Data sources: i = ITIS, c = Catalogue of Life, g = GBIF, b = Bugguide.net
