= Rhyssemus morgani =

Scientific classification
- Kingdom: Animalia
- Phylum: Arthropoda
- Clade: Pancrustacea
- Class: Insecta
- Order: Coleoptera
- Suborder: Polyphaga
- Infraorder: Scarabaeiformia
- Family: Scarabaeidae
- Genus: Rhyssemus
- Species: R. morgani

Binomial name
- Rhyssemus morgani Bénard, 1911

Synonyms
- Rhyssemus berytensis morgani Bénard, 1911

Species of beetle

Rhyssemus morgani is a species of beetle of the family Scarabaeidae. It is found in Azerbaijan and Iran.

== Description ==
Adults reach a length of about 4–5 mm (0.16–0.20 in). They are similar to Rhyssemus berytensis, but more slender, more parallel-sided, and with a light to dark chestnut-brown colour.
