= Cranwich Camp =

UK Site of Special Scientific Interest

Coordinates: 52.516°N 0.613°E

- Site of Special Scientific Interest
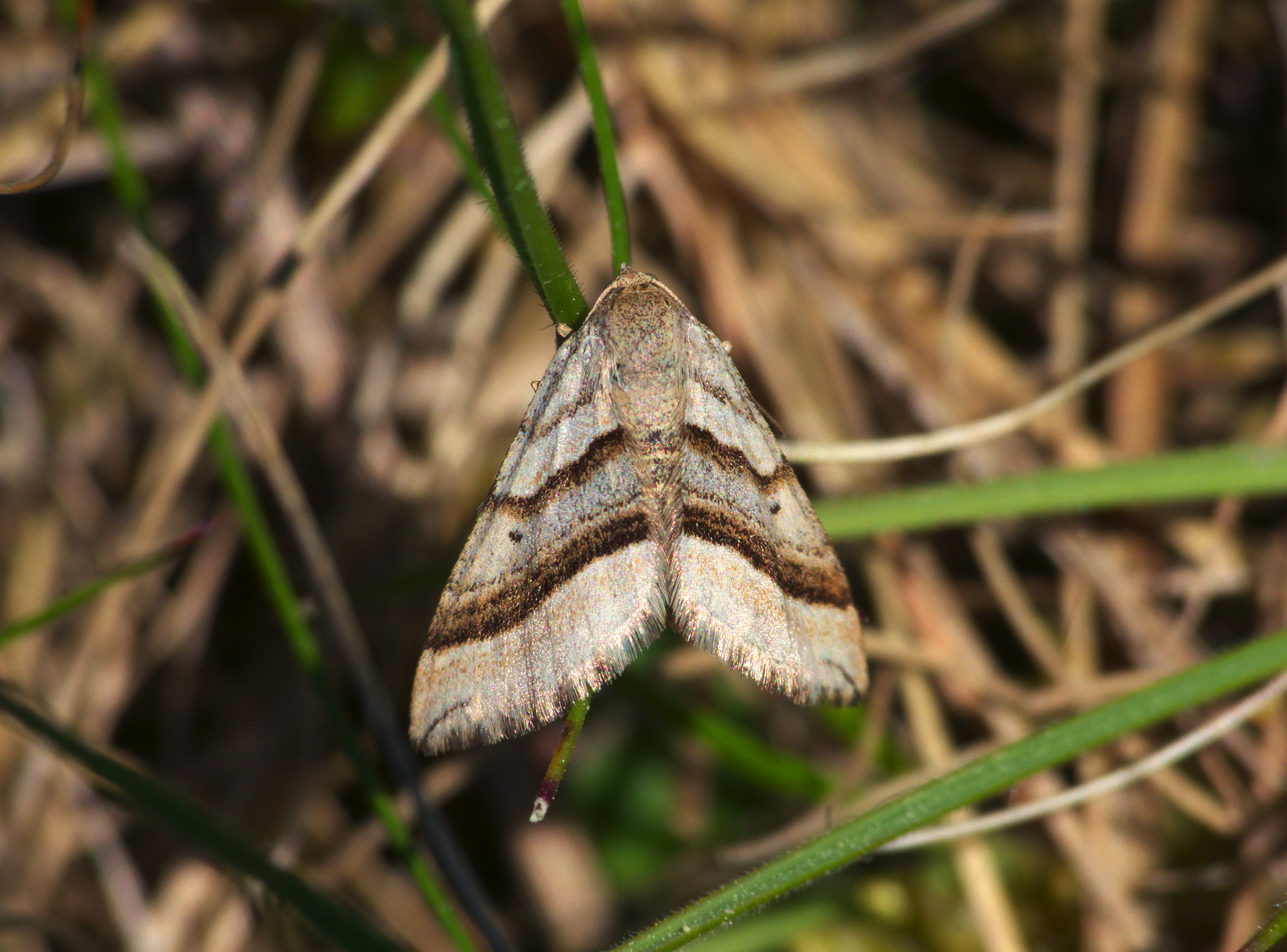
- Location of Cranwich Camp.
- Area of search: Norfolk
- Grid reference: TL 774 941
- Interest: Biological
- Area: 13.1 hectares (32 acres)
- Notification date: 1992
- Location map: Magic Map

Cranwich Camp is a 13.1-hectare (32-acre) biological Site of Special Scientific Interest (SSSI) north-west of Thetford in Norfolk, England. It is part of the Breckland Special Area of Conservation and Special Protection Area. The boundaries of Cranwich Camp SSSI are contiguous with the boundaries of Breckland Forest SSSI.

This former army camp in the Breckland is now grassland, and it has a high value both entomologically and botanically. It has four Red Data Book insects and three Red Data Book plants. Rabbits help to maintain the diverse flora and disturbed ground. Insect species recorded in this protected area include Tawny Wave moth, Marbled Clover moth and the beetles Odontaeus armiger and Diastictus vulneratus.

The site is open to the public. Part of the land area designated as Cranwich Camp SSSI is owned by the Forestry Commission.
