= Aphodopsammobius australicus =

Scientific classification
- Kingdom: Animalia
- Phylum: Arthropoda
- Clade: Pancrustacea
- Class: Insecta
- Order: Coleoptera
- Suborder: Polyphaga
- Infraorder: Scarabaeiformia
- Family: Scarabaeidae
- Genus: Aphodopsammobius
- Species: A. australicus

Binomial name
- Aphodopsammobius australicus (Blackburn, 1904)

Synonyms
- Psammodius australicus Blackburn, 1904; Psammobius densepunctatus Petrovitz, 1964

Species of beetle

Aphodopsammobius australicus is a species of beetle of the family Scarabaeidae. It is found in Australia (New South Wales, Northern Territory, South Australia, Queensland, Western Australia).
