= Rhyssemus interruptus =

Scientific classification
- Kingdom: Animalia
- Phylum: Arthropoda
- Clade: Pancrustacea
- Class: Insecta
- Order: Coleoptera
- Suborder: Polyphaga
- Infraorder: Scarabaeiformia
- Family: Scarabaeidae
- Genus: Rhyssemus
- Species: R. interruptus

Binomial name
- Rhyssemus interruptus Reitter, 1892

Synonyms
- Rhyssemus reitteri Koshantschikov, 1894

Species of beetle

Rhyssemus interruptus is a species of beetle of the family Scarabaeidae. It is found in Armenia, Azerbaijan, Kazakhstan, Kyrgyzstan, Russia, Tajikistan and Uzbekistan.

== Description ==
Adults reach a length of about 4–4.3 mm (0.16–0.17 in). They have a rather robust, strongly convex, black body, with the frontal margin of the head and the legs light reddish-brown.
