= Rhyssemus goudoti =

Scientific classification
- Kingdom: Animalia
- Phylum: Arthropoda
- Clade: Pancrustacea
- Class: Insecta
- Order: Coleoptera
- Suborder: Polyphaga
- Infraorder: Scarabaeiformia
- Family: Scarabaeidae
- Genus: Rhyssemus
- Species: R. goudoti

Binomial name
- Rhyssemus goudoti Harold, 1868

Synonyms
- Oxyomus goudotii Dejean, 1836; Boucardius madagassus Petrovitz, 1967

Species of beetle

Rhyssemus goudoti is a species of beetle of the family Scarabaeidae. It is found in Madagascar and eastern Africa.

== Description ==
Adults reach a length of about 3–3.7 mm (0.12–0.15 in). They have a distinctly convex body. The forebody is blackish-brown and the elytra are dark reddish-brown.
