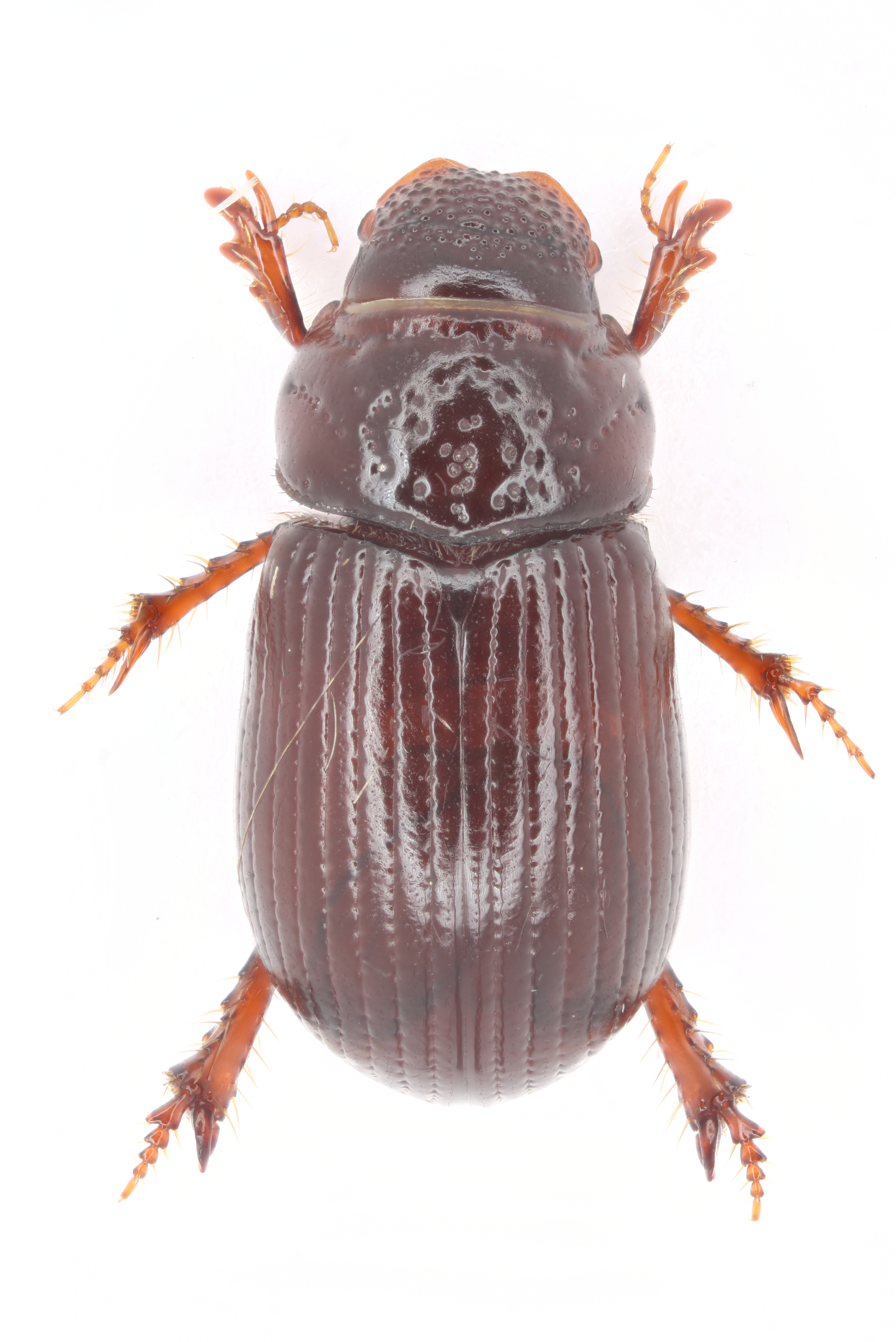

Scientific classification
- Kingdom: Animalia
- Phylum: Arthropoda
- Clade: Pancrustacea
- Class: Insecta
- Order: Coleoptera
- Suborder: Polyphaga
- Infraorder: Scarabaeiformia
- Family: Scarabaeidae
- Tribe: Psammodiini
- Genus: Leiopsammodius; Rakovic, 1981

= Leiopsammodius =

Genus of beetles

Leiopsammodius is a genus of aphodiine dung beetles in the family Scarabaeidae. There are more than 40 described species in Leiopsammodius.

== Species ==
These 48 species belong to the genus Leiopsammodius:

- Leiopsammodius abyssinicus (Müller, 1942)
- Leiopsammodius acei Harpootlian, Gordon & Woodruff, 2000
- Leiopsammodius aegialius (Adam, 1986)
- Leiopsammodius balthasari Rakovic, 1995
- Leiopsammodius belloi (Pierotti, 1980)
- Leiopsammodius bolivianus (Cartwright, 1955)
- Leiopsammodius degallieri Rakovic, Mencl & Kral, 2017
- Leiopsammodius desertorum (Fairmaire, 1868)
- Leiopsammodius deyrupi Harpootlian, Gordon & Woodruff, 2000
- Leiopsammodius endroedii Rakovic, 1981
- Leiopsammodius evanidus (Péringuey, 1901)
- Leiopsammodius freyi (Petrovitz, 1961)
- Leiopsammodius gestroi (Clouët, 1900)
- Leiopsammodius globatus (Petrovitz, 1972)
- Leiopsammodius haruspex (Adam, 1980)
- Leiopsammodius horaki Rakovic & Kral, 1996
- Leiopsammodius implicatus (Schmidt, 1925)
- Leiopsammodius indefensus (Schmidt, 1909)
- Leiopsammodius indicus (Harold, 1877)
- Leiopsammodius inflatus (Cartwright, 1955)
- Leiopsammodius japonicus (Harold, 1878)
- Leiopsammodius jelineki (Rakovic, 1977)
- Leiopsammodius kenyensis (Rakovic, 1978)
- Leiopsammodius laevicollis (Klug, 1845)
- Leiopsammodius laevis (Paulian, 1942)
- Leiopsammodius litoralis (Lea, 1923)
- Leiopsammodius liviae (Pittino, 1978)
- Leiopsammodius malindii Rakovic, Mencl & Kral, 2017
- Leiopsammodius malkini (Cartwright, 1946)
- Leiopsammodius manaosi (Cartwright, 1955)
- Leiopsammodius martinezi (Cartwright, 1955)
- Leiopsammodius modestus (Péringuey, 1901)
- Leiopsammodius newcastleensis Stebnicka & Howden, 1996
- Leiopsammodius nomurai Masumoto, 2012
- Leiopsammodius ocmulgeei Harpootlian, Gordon & Woodruff, 2000
- Leiopsammodius pellucens (Petrovitz, 1961)
- Leiopsammodius placidus (Schmidt, 1911)
- Leiopsammodius rakovici Kral, 2017
- Leiopsammodius rufus (Rakovic, 1981)
- Leiopsammodius santaremi (Cartwright, 1955)
- Leiopsammodius scabrifrons (Walker, 1871)
- Leiopsammodius seychellensis (Rakovic, 1979)
- Leiopsammodius soledadei (Petrovitz, 1961)
- Leiopsammodius somalicus (Petrovitz, 1961)
- Leiopsammodius strumae (Chromy, 1983)
- Leiopsammodius subciliatus (Harold, 1869)
- Leiopsammodius substriatus (Balthasar, 1941)
- Leiopsammodius viti (Chalumeau, 1983)
