= Rhyssemus pertinax =

Scientific classification
- Kingdom: Animalia
- Phylum: Arthropoda
- Clade: Pancrustacea
- Class: Insecta
- Order: Coleoptera
- Suborder: Polyphaga
- Infraorder: Scarabaeiformia
- Family: Scarabaeidae
- Genus: Rhyssemus
- Species: R. pertinax

Binomial name
- Rhyssemus pertinax Balthasar, 1961

Species of beetle

Rhyssemus pertinax is a species of beetle of the family Scarabaeidae. It is found in Belgium.

== Description ==
Adults reach a length of about 3.6 mm (0.14 in). They have a fairly parallel-sided, strongly convex, semi-dull, black body, with the legs and anterior margin of the head dark reddish-brown.
