= Neomyrhessus samurai =

Scientific classification
- Kingdom: Animalia
- Phylum: Arthropoda
- Clade: Pancrustacea
- Class: Insecta
- Order: Coleoptera
- Suborder: Polyphaga
- Infraorder: Scarabaeiformia
- Family: Scarabaeidae
- Genus: Neomyrhessus
- Species: N. samurai

Binomial name
- Neomyrhessus samurai (Balthasar, 1941)

Synonyms
- Rhyssemus samurai Balthasar, 1941; Rhyssemus tuberculatus Nomura & Nakane, 1951

Species of beetle

Neomyrhessus samurai is a species of beetle of the family Scarabaeidae. It is found in Japan.

== Description ==
Adults reach a length of about 3 mm (0.12 in). They have a strongly convex, rather shiny, blackish-brown to black body, with the margins of the head and the legs reddish-brown.
