= Aphodopsammobius zietzi =

Scientific classification
- Kingdom: Animalia
- Phylum: Arthropoda
- Clade: Pancrustacea
- Class: Insecta
- Order: Coleoptera
- Suborder: Polyphaga
- Infraorder: Scarabaeiformia
- Family: Scarabaeidae
- Genus: Aphodopsammobius
- Species: A. zietzi

Binomial name
- Aphodopsammobius zietzi (Blackburn, 1895)

Synonyms
- Ataenius zietzi Blackburn, 1895; Australammoecius flavipennis Petrovitz, 1963

Species of beetle

Aphodopsammobius zietzi is a species of beetle of the family Scarabaeidae. It is found in Australia (New South Wales, Northern Territory, South Australia, Queensland, Western Australia).
