= Granulopsammodius transcaspicus =

Scientific classification
- Kingdom: Animalia
- Phylum: Arthropoda
- Clade: Pancrustacea
- Class: Insecta
- Order: Coleoptera
- Suborder: Polyphaga
- Infraorder: Scarabaeiformia
- Family: Scarabaeidae
- Genus: Granulopsammodius
- Species: G. transcaspicus

Binomial name
- Granulopsammodius transcaspicus (Petrovitz, 1961)

Synonyms
- Psammobius transcaspicus Petrovitz, 1961

Species of beetle

Granulopsammodius transcaspicus is a species of beetle of the family Scarabaeidae. It is found in Kazakhstan, Russia, Turkmenistan and Uzbekistan.

== Description ==
Adults reach a length of about 3.3 mm (0.13 in). They have a shiny, bright reddish-brown body, with the forebody somewhat darker.
