= Trichiopsammobius brasiliensis =

Scientific classification
- Kingdom: Animalia
- Phylum: Arthropoda
- Clade: Pancrustacea
- Class: Insecta
- Order: Coleoptera
- Suborder: Polyphaga
- Infraorder: Scarabaeiformia
- Family: Scarabaeidae
- Genus: Trichiopsammobius
- Species: T. brasiliensis

Binomial name
- Trichiopsammobius brasiliensis Petrovitz, 1963

Species of beetle

Trichiopsammobius brasiliensis is a species of beetle of the family Scarabaeidae. It is found in Brazil (Alagoas, Bahia, Goiás, Maranhão, Mato Grosso, Mato Grosso do Sul, Minas Gerais, Paraíba, Piauí, Rio Grande do Norte, Tocantins), Paraguay and Venezuela.

== Description ==
Adults reach a length of about 3.6–3.8 mm (0.14–0.15 in). The clypeus is entirely granulate and sinuate, the lateral angles with small upturned teeth. The frons has punctures smaller than those of the pronotum. The pronotum is without transverse ridges and is densely punctured by setiferous punctures. The elytra have the interstriae covered with setaceous tubercles.

== Life history ==
Specimens have been collected in pastures and have been found on horse and Tapirus dung.
