= Rhyssemus exaratus =

Scientific classification
- Kingdom: Animalia
- Phylum: Arthropoda
- Clade: Pancrustacea
- Class: Insecta
- Order: Coleoptera
- Suborder: Polyphaga
- Infraorder: Scarabaeiformia
- Family: Scarabaeidae
- Genus: Rhyssemus
- Species: R. exaratus

Binomial name
- Rhyssemus exaratus Marseul, 1878

Synonyms
- Rhyssemus sequensi Reitter, 1903

Species of beetle

Rhyssemus exaratus is a species of beetle of the family Scarabaeidae. It is found in Egypt, Saudi Arabia, Yemen, Eritrea, Sudan, Somalia and Tanzania.

== Description ==
Adults reach a length of about 3.3–3.6 mm (0.13–0.14 in). They have an elongate, quite strongly convex, slightly glossy, black or blackish-brown body, with the anterior margin of the head and legs lighter reddish-brown.
