= Geopsammodius =

Scientific classification
- Domain: Eukaryota
- Kingdom: Animalia
- Phylum: Arthropoda
- Class: Insecta
- Order: Coleoptera
- Suborder: Polyphaga
- Infraorder: Scarabaeiformia
- Family: Scarabaeidae
- Tribe: Psammodiini
- Genus: Geopsammodius; Gordon & Pittino, 1992

Genus of beetles

Geopsammodius is a genus of aphodiine dung beetles in the family Scarabaeidae. There are about 9 described species in Geopsammodius.

== Species ==
- Geopsammodius fuscus Skelley, 2006
- Geopsammodius hydropicus (Horn, 1887) (Atlantic dune tiny sand-loving scarab)
- Geopsammodius morrisi Skelley, 2006
- Geopsammodius ohoopee Skelley, 2006
- Geopsammodius relictillus (Deyrup & Woodruff, 1991) (relictual tiny sand-loving scarab)
- Geopsammodius rileyi Skelley, 2006
- Geopsammodius subpedalis Skelley, 2006 (underfoot tiny sand-loving scarab)
- Geopsammodius unsidensis Skelley, 2006
- Geopsammodius withlacoochee Skelley, 2006
