= Rhyssemodes =

Scientific classification
- Kingdom: Animalia
- Phylum: Arthropoda
- Clade: Pancrustacea
- Class: Insecta
- Order: Coleoptera
- Suborder: Polyphaga
- Infraorder: Scarabaeiformia
- Family: Scarabaeidae
- Subfamily: Aphodiinae
- Tribe: Psammodiini
- Genus: Rhyssemodes; Reitter, 1892

Genus of beetles

Rhyssemodes is a genus of beetles of the family Scarabaeidae.

== Species ==
- Rhyssemodes alutaceus Reitter, 1892
- Rhyssemodes bouvieri Clouët, 1901
- Rhyssemodes malyi Rakovič, 1982
- Rhyssemodes ningxia Rakovič, Král & Mencl, 2017
- Rhyssemodes nox Iablokov-Khnzoryan, 1971
- Rhyssemodes orientalis (Mulsant & Godart, 1874)
- Rhyssemodes sindicus Pittino, 1984
- Rhyssemodes taklamakan Rakovič, Král & Mencl, 2017
- Rhyssemodes tenuisculptus Reitter, 1892
- Rhyssemodes transcaspicus Rakovič, 1982
- Rhyssemodes turcicus Pittino & Rakovič, 1984
- Rhyssemodes wittmeri Pittino, 1984
- Rhyssemodes yuanyuanae Král, Mencl & Rakovič, 2023
