= Leiopsammodius globatus =

Scientific classification
- Kingdom: Animalia
- Phylum: Arthropoda
- Clade: Pancrustacea
- Class: Insecta
- Order: Coleoptera
- Suborder: Polyphaga
- Infraorder: Scarabaeiformia
- Family: Scarabaeidae
- Genus: Leiopsammodius
- Species: L. globatus

Binomial name
- Leiopsammodius globatus (Petrovitz, 1972)

Synonyms
- Psammobius globatus Petrovitz, 1972

Species of beetle

Leiopsammodius globatus is a species of beetle of the family Scarabaeidae. It is found in Brazil (São Paulo).

== Description ==
Adults reach a length of about 3.5 mm (0.14 in). The body is piceous. The pronotum is without transverse furrows and the lateral margins do not have a fringe of setae. The elytra are without a humeral tooth and the striae are strongly impressed.
