= Neopsammodius interruptus =

Scientific classification
- Domain: Eukaryota
- Kingdom: Animalia
- Phylum: Arthropoda
- Class: Insecta
- Order: Coleoptera
- Suborder: Polyphaga
- Infraorder: Scarabaeiformia
- Family: Scarabaeidae
- Genus: Neopsammodius
- Species: N. interruptus

Binomial name
- Neopsammodius interruptus (Say, 1835)

Species of beetle

Neopsammodius interruptus is a species of aphodiine dung beetle in the family Scarabaeidae. It is found in North America.
