= Neorhyssemus =

Scientific classification
- Kingdom: Animalia
- Phylum: Arthropoda
- Clade: Pancrustacea
- Class: Insecta
- Order: Coleoptera
- Suborder: Polyphaga
- Infraorder: Scarabaeiformia
- Family: Scarabaeidae
- Subfamily: Aphodiinae
- Tribe: Psammodiini
- Genus: Neorhyssemus; Gordon & Pittino, 1992

Genus of beetles

Neorhyssemus is a genus of beetles of the family Scarabaeidae.

== Species ==
- Neorhyssemus beccarii (Balthasar, 1939)
- Neorhyssemus intrinsecus (Gordon & Cartwright, 1980)
- Neorhyssemus lineatus (Gordon & Cartwright, 1980)
- Neorhyssemus quinquecostatus (Schmidt, 1911)
