= Rhyssemodes tenuisculptus =

Scientific classification
- Kingdom: Animalia
- Phylum: Arthropoda
- Clade: Pancrustacea
- Class: Insecta
- Order: Coleoptera
- Suborder: Polyphaga
- Infraorder: Scarabaeiformia
- Family: Scarabaeidae
- Genus: Rhyssemodes
- Species: R. tenuisculptus

Binomial name
- Rhyssemodes tenuisculptus Reitter, 1892

Synonyms
- Rhyssemodes opacus Reitter, 1892

Species of beetle

Rhyssemodes tenuisculptus is a species of beetle of the family Scarabaeidae. It is found in Afghanistan, Kazakhstan, Turkmenistan and Uzbekistan.

== Description ==
Adults reach a length of about 3–3.8 mm (0.12–0.15 in). They have an elongate, nearly parallel-sided, slightly shiny or almost dull body. The head and pronotum are dark brown, with the anterior margin of the clypeus, the sides of the pronotum and the elytra lighter reddish-brown. The legs are brown.
