= Rhyssemus feae =

Scientific classification
- Kingdom: Animalia
- Phylum: Arthropoda
- Clade: Pancrustacea
- Class: Insecta
- Order: Coleoptera
- Suborder: Polyphaga
- Infraorder: Scarabaeiformia
- Family: Scarabaeidae
- Genus: Rhyssemus
- Species: R. feae

Binomial name
- Rhyssemus feae Clouët, 1901

Synonyms
- Rhyssemus lunatus Petrovitz, 1963; Rhyssemus tonkineus Balthasar, 1945

Species of beetle

Rhyssemus feae is a species of beetle of the family Scarabaeidae. It is found in Myanmar, Thailand, Vietnam and Taiwan.

== Description ==
Adults reach a length of about 3 mm (0.12 in). They have a very robust, broad, but rather weakly convex, reddish-brown body, with the disc of the head and the pronotum darker.
