= Rhyssemus freudei =

Scientific classification
- Kingdom: Animalia
- Phylum: Arthropoda
- Clade: Pancrustacea
- Class: Insecta
- Order: Coleoptera
- Suborder: Polyphaga
- Infraorder: Scarabaeiformia
- Family: Scarabaeidae
- Genus: Rhyssemus
- Species: R. freudei

Binomial name
- Rhyssemus freudei Balthasar, 1960

Synonyms
- Rhyssemus alternatus Petrovitz, 1973

Species of beetle

Rhyssemus freudei is a species of beetle of the family Scarabaeidae. It is found in India (Uttarakhand), Nepal, Pakistan and Bangladesh.

== Description ==
Adults reach a length of about 3.2–3.5 mm (0.13–0.14 in). They have an elongate, parallel-sided, dull, blackish-brown to black body.
