= Leiopsammodius scabrifrons =

Scientific classification
- Kingdom: Animalia
- Phylum: Arthropoda
- Clade: Pancrustacea
- Class: Insecta
- Order: Coleoptera
- Suborder: Polyphaga
- Infraorder: Scarabaeiformia
- Family: Scarabaeidae
- Genus: Leiopsammodius
- Species: L. scabrifrons

Binomial name
- Leiopsammodius scabrifrons (Walker, 1871)

Synonyms
- Psammodius scabrifrons Walker, 1871

Species of beetle

Leiopsammodius scabrifrons is a species of beetle of the family Scarabaeidae. It is found in Egypt.

== Description ==
Adults reach a length of about 3 mm (0.12 in). They have a strongly convex, glossy, reddish-brown body.
