= Rhyssemus sulcatus =

Scientific classification
- Kingdom: Animalia
- Phylum: Arthropoda
- Clade: Pancrustacea
- Class: Insecta
- Order: Coleoptera
- Suborder: Polyphaga
- Infraorder: Scarabaeiformia
- Family: Scarabaeidae
- Genus: Rhyssemus
- Species: R. sulcatus

Binomial name
- Rhyssemus sulcatus (Olivier, 1789)

Synonyms
- Trox sulcatus Olivier, 1789; Rhyssemus costipennis Reitter, 1894; Rhyssemus corrugatulus Reitter, 1892; Rhyssemus godarti Mulsant, 1846

Species of beetle

Rhyssemus sulcatus is a species of beetle of the family Scarabaeidae. It is found in Algeria, France, Italy (Sicily), Morocco and Spain.

== Description ==
Adults reach a length of about 3.5–4.2 mm (0.14–0.17 in). They have an elongate, fairly parallel-sided, not very shiny, black body, with the legs reddish-brown.
