= Rhyssemus plicatus =

Scientific classification
- Kingdom: Animalia
- Phylum: Arthropoda
- Clade: Pancrustacea
- Class: Insecta
- Order: Coleoptera
- Suborder: Polyphaga
- Infraorder: Scarabaeiformia
- Family: Scarabaeidae
- Genus: Rhyssemus
- Species: R. plicatus

Binomial name
- Rhyssemus plicatus (Germar, 1817)

Synonyms
- Aphodius plicatus Germar, 1817; Rhyssemus kocheri Petrovitz, 1968; Rhyssemus sulcigaster Mulsant & Rey, 1859; Oxyomus arenarius Costa, 1844

Species of beetle

Rhyssemus plicatus is a species of beetle of the family Scarabaeidae. It is found in Albania, Algeria, Bosnia Herzegovina, Croatia, France (Corsica), Greece, Crete, Corfu, Italy, Sardinia, Sicily, Malta, Morocco, Tunisia and possibly Spain.

== Description ==
Adults reach a length of about 3.5–4 mm (0.14–0.16 in). They have a rather broad, strongly convex, black body, with light reddish-brown legs.
