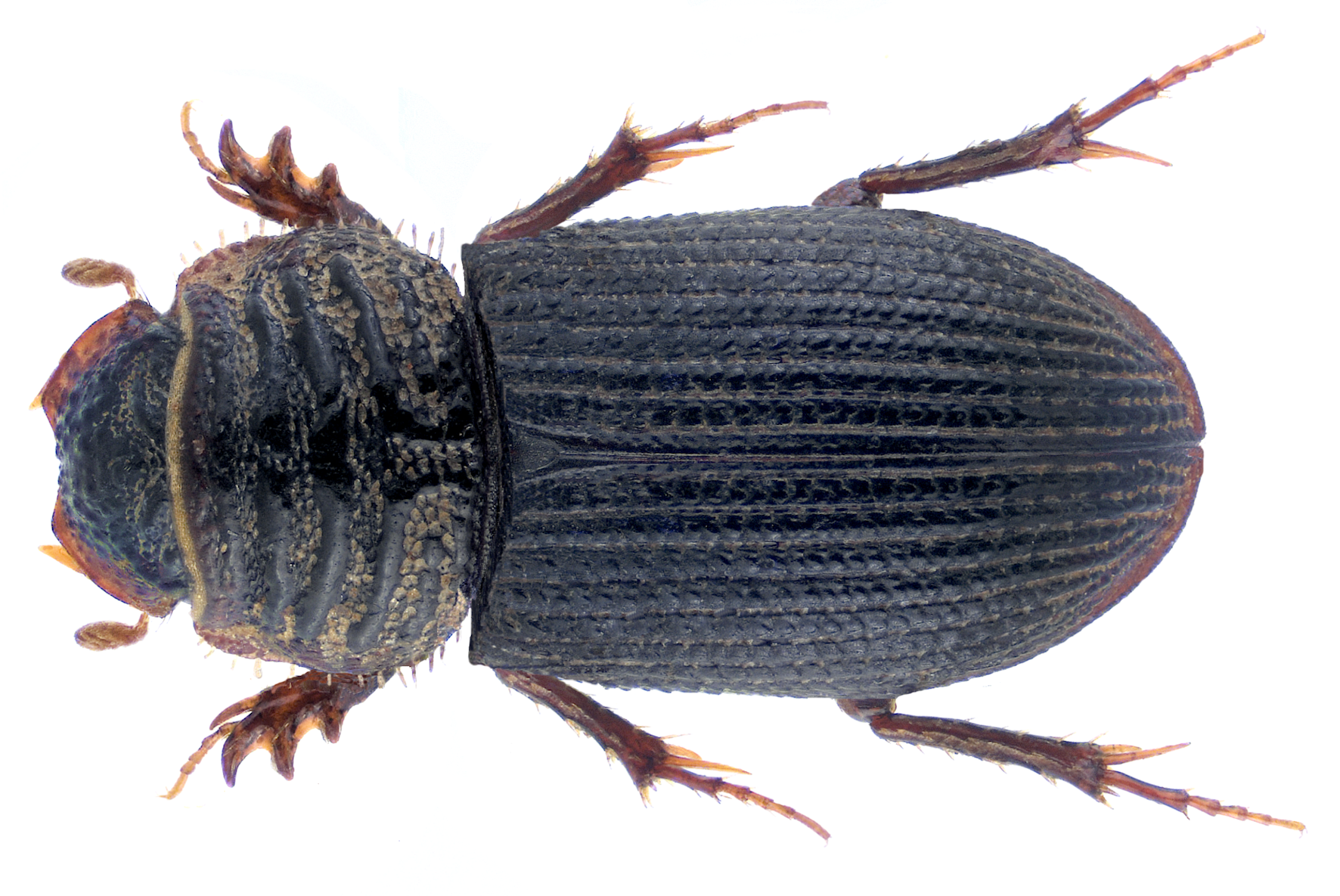

Scientific classification
- Kingdom: Animalia
- Phylum: Arthropoda
- Clade: Pancrustacea
- Class: Insecta
- Order: Coleoptera
- Suborder: Polyphaga
- Infraorder: Scarabaeiformia
- Family: Scarabaeidae
- Genus: Rhyssemus
- Species: R. inscitus

Binomial name
- Rhyssemus inscitus (Walker, 1858)

Synonyms
- Psammodius inscitus Walker, 1858; Rhyssemus inscitus Pittino, 1984; Rhyssemodes inscitus Schmidt, 1922; Rhyssemus philippineus Masumoto, 1980; Rhyssemus australis Petrovitz, 1963; Rhyssemus insignicollis Lea, 1923; Rhyssemus malasiacus Lansberge, 1886; Rhyssemus mussardi Petrovitz, 1975; Rhyssemus papuanus Petrovitz, 1965; Rhyssemus tarsalis Waterhouse, 1876; Rhyssemus philippineus Masumoto, 1980

= Rhyssemus inscitus =

Species of beetle

Rhyssemus inscitus is a species of dung beetle widespread throughout Afro-Oriental regions, Indochinese regions and Australia.

== Description ==
Adults reach a length of about 3 mm (0.12 in). They have an elongate-oval, shiny, blackish-brown body, with the anterior margin of the head and the legs lighter reddish-brown.

== Distribution ==
The species is found in Madagascar, India. Sri Lanka, Indonesia, Laos, Myanmar, Nepal, South China, Japan, Thailand, Philippines, Vietnam, Papua New Guinea and Australia.
