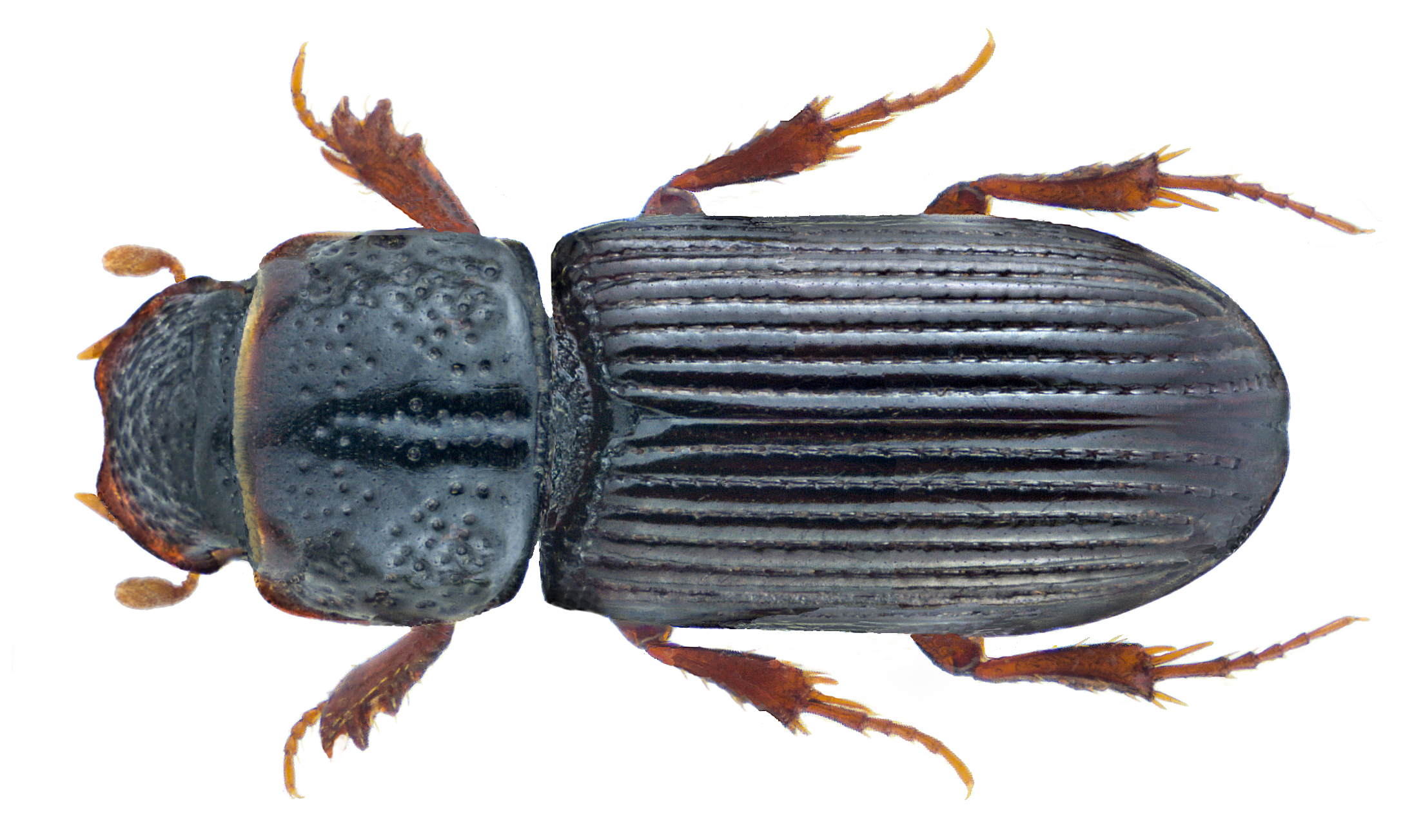
- Pleurophorus caesus

Scientific classification
- Kingdom: Animalia
- Phylum: Arthropoda
- Clade: Pancrustacea
- Class: Insecta
- Order: Coleoptera
- Suborder: Polyphaga
- Infraorder: Scarabaeiformia
- Family: Scarabaeidae
- Subfamily: Aphodiinae
- Tribe: Psammodiini; Mulsant, 1842

Subtribes
- Phycocina Landin, 1960; Psammodiina Mulsant, 1842; Rhyssemina Pittino & Mariani, 1986

= Psammodiini =

Tribe of beetles

Psammodiini is a tribe of aphodiine dung beetles in the family Scarabaeidae. There are more than 30 genera and 470 described species in Psammodiini.

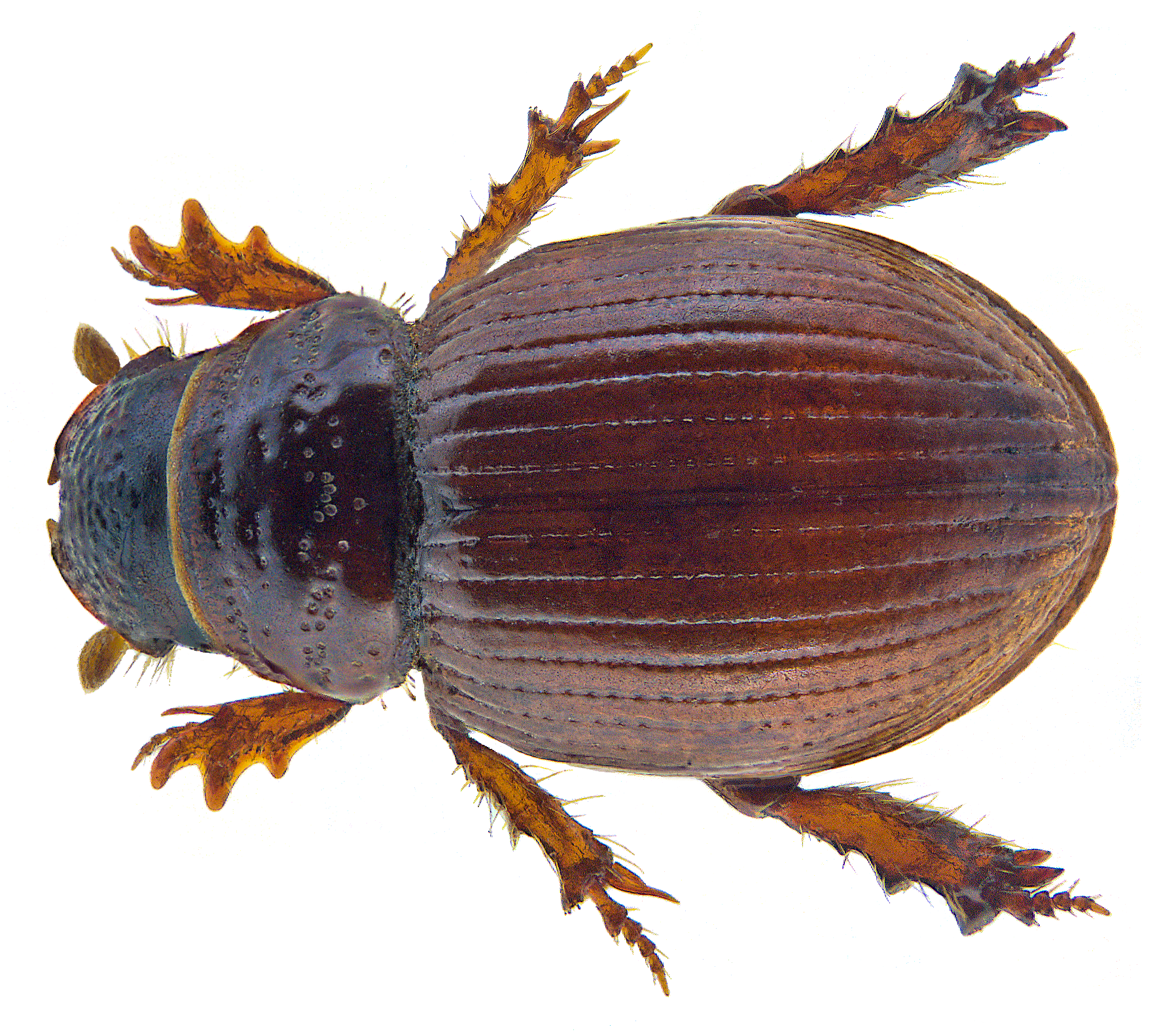
Tesarius caelatus

== Genera ==
These 37 genera belong to the tribe Psammodiini:

- Afrodiastictus Pittino & Mariani, 1986
- Aphodopsammobius Endrödi, 1964
- Bordatius Pittino & Mariani, 1986
- Brindalus Landin, 1960
- Diastictus Mulsant, 1842
- Geopsammodius Gordon & Pittino, 1992
- Granulopsammodius Rakovič, 1981
- Ingogius Endrödi, 1976
- Leiopsammodius Rakovič, 1981
- Messyrhus Rakovič & Král, 1997
- Myrhessus Balthasar, 1955
- Mysarus Petrovitz, 1962
- Neomyrhessus Minkina, 2024
- Neopsammodius Rakovič, 1986
- Neorhyssemus Gordon & Pittino, 1992
- Neotrichiorhyssemus Rakovič & Král, 1997
- Odontopsammodius Gordon & Pittino, 1992
- Orocanthus Endrödi, 1983
- Parapsammodius Verdu, Stebnicka & Galante, 2006
- Pararhyssemus Balthasar, 1955
- Petrovitzius Rakovič, 1979
- Phycochus Broun, 1886
- Pittinius Rakovič & Král, 1997
- Platytomus Mulsant, 1842
- Pleurophorus Mulsant, 1842
- Psammodaphodius Endrödi, 1976
- Psammodius Fallen, 1807
- Psammorpha Stebnicka, 1994
- Pseudomyrhessus Minkina, 2024
- Rakovicius Pittino, 2006
- Rhyssemodes Reitter, 1892
- Rhyssemorphus Clouët, 1900
- Rhyssemus Mulsant, 1842
- Sicardia Reitter, 1896
- Tesarius Rakovič, 1981
- Trichiopsammobius Petrovitz, 1963
- Trichiorhyssemus Clouët, 1901
