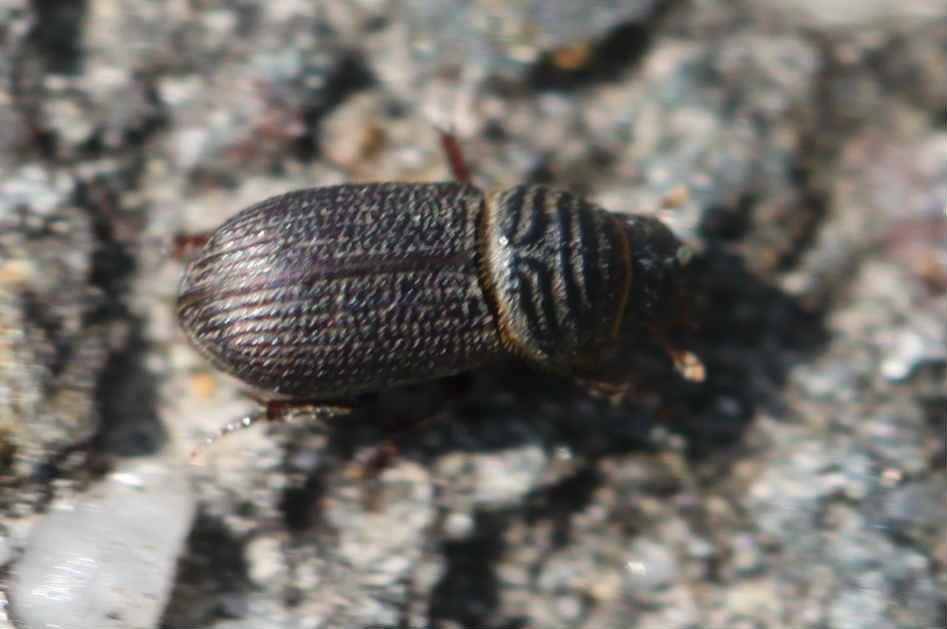

Scientific classification
- Kingdom: Animalia
- Phylum: Arthropoda
- Clade: Pancrustacea
- Class: Insecta
- Order: Coleoptera
- Suborder: Polyphaga
- Infraorder: Scarabaeiformia
- Family: Scarabaeidae
- Genus: Rhyssemus
- Species: R. germanus

Binomial name
- Rhyssemus germanus (Linnaeus, 1767)

Synonyms
- Ptinus germanus Linnaeus, 1767; Rhyssemus funebris Roubal, 1912; Rhyssemus geminatus Reitter, 1890; Rhyssemus germanus obsoletus Rey, 1890

= Rhyssemus germanus =

Species of beetle

Rhyssemus germanus is a species of aphodiine dung beetle in the family Scarabaeidae. It is found in Europe and Northern Asia (excluding China) and North America.

== Description ==
Adults reach a length of about 2.6–3.5 mm (0.10–0.14 in). They are dark brown, with the anterior margin of the head and the legs light reddish-brown.

== Distribution ==
Palaearctic: Albania, Algeria, Belarus, Belgium, Bosnia Herzegovina, Georgia, India (Uttarakhand), Iran, Kazakhstan, Libya, Lithuania, Montenegro, Morocco, Russia, Russia Far East, Saudi Arabia, Serbia, Slovakia, Sweden, Tunisia, Ukraine. Nearctic: Canada (Ontario, Quebec). Oriental: India (Andaman & Nicobar, Chhattisgarh, Haryana, Madhya Pradesh).
