= Neotrichiorhyssemus hirsutus =

Scientific classification
- Kingdom: Animalia
- Phylum: Arthropoda
- Clade: Pancrustacea
- Class: Insecta
- Order: Coleoptera
- Suborder: Polyphaga
- Infraorder: Scarabaeiformia
- Family: Scarabaeidae
- Genus: Neotrichiorhyssemus
- Species: N. hirsutus

Binomial name
- Neotrichiorhyssemus hirsutus (Clouët, 1901)

Synonyms
- Trichiorhyssemus hirsutus Clouët, 1901; Trichiorhyssemus samoanus Balthasar, 1963; Trichiorhyssemus cariei Bénard, 1918

Species of beetle

Neotrichiorhyssemus hirsutus is a species of beetle of the family Scarabaeidae. It is found in India, Indonesia (Java, Kalimantan, Lombok, Maluku, Sulawesi, Sumatra, Sumbawa, Timor), Malaysia (Sabah), the Phlipppines, Thailand, Taiwan, Papua New Guinea, Fiji, Samoa, La Réunion, Mauritius and the Seychelles.

== Description ==
Adults reach a length of about 3–3.4 mm (0.12–0.13 in). They have a very stout, convex, slightly shiny, black body, with a single row of setae on the elytra.
