= Leiopsammodius martinezi =

Scientific classification
- Kingdom: Animalia
- Phylum: Arthropoda
- Clade: Pancrustacea
- Class: Insecta
- Order: Coleoptera
- Suborder: Polyphaga
- Infraorder: Scarabaeiformia
- Family: Scarabaeidae
- Genus: Leiopsammodius
- Species: L. martinezi

Binomial name
- Leiopsammodius martinezi (Cartwright, 1955)

Synonyms
- Psammodius martinezi Cartwright, 1955

Species of beetle

Leiopsammodius martinezi is a species of beetle of the family Scarabaeidae. It is found in Brazil (Distrito Federal, Mato Grosso, Minas Gerais, Paraná, Rio de Janeiro, São Paulo) and Paraguay.

== Description ==
Adults reach a length of about 3.8 mm (0.15 in). The body is robust, compact and piceous. The head is granulate, with the clypeus emarginate. The pronotum has vestigial transverse furrows right behind the eyes and the dorsal surface is densely punctured with moderate to coarse punctures.

== Life history ==
Specimens were collected within bovine faecal masses and fermented fruits (pineapple). This species occurs at altitudes up to 1500 metres.
