= Trichiorhyssemus asperulus =

Scientific classification
- Kingdom: Animalia
- Phylum: Arthropoda
- Clade: Pancrustacea
- Class: Insecta
- Order: Coleoptera
- Suborder: Polyphaga
- Infraorder: Scarabaeiformia
- Family: Scarabaeidae
- Genus: Trichiorhyssemus
- Species: T. asperulus

Binomial name
- Trichiorhyssemus asperulus (Waterhouse, 1875)

Synonyms
- Rhyssemus asperulus Waterhouse, 1875

Species of beetle

Trichiorhyssemus asperulus is a species of beetle of the family Scarabaeidae. It is found in Japan and Korea.

== Description ==
Adults reach a length of about 3–3.4 mm (0.12–0.13 in). They have a short, stout, convex, rather dull, black body. The upper surface is covered with short setae and the intervals of the elytra have two rows of setae.
