= Rhyssemodes bouvieri =

Scientific classification
- Kingdom: Animalia
- Phylum: Arthropoda
- Clade: Pancrustacea
- Class: Insecta
- Order: Coleoptera
- Suborder: Polyphaga
- Infraorder: Scarabaeiformia
- Family: Scarabaeidae
- Genus: Rhyssemodes
- Species: R. bouvieri

Binomial name
- Rhyssemodes bouvieri Clouët, 1901

Species of beetle

Rhyssemodes bouvieri is a species of beetle of the family Scarabaeidae. It is found in China (Beijing, Nei Mongol, Tianjin) and Mongolia.

== Description ==
Adults reach a length of about 2.8–3 mm (0.11–0.12 in). They have an elongate, not very shiny, blackish-brown body, with the frontal margin of the head and the legs reddish-brown.
