= Rhyssemus granosus =

Scientific classification
- Kingdom: Animalia
- Phylum: Arthropoda
- Clade: Pancrustacea
- Class: Insecta
- Order: Coleoptera
- Suborder: Polyphaga
- Infraorder: Scarabaeiformia
- Family: Scarabaeidae
- Genus: Rhyssemus
- Species: R. granosus

Binomial name
- Rhyssemus granosus (Klug & Erichson, 1842)

Synonyms
- Oxyomus granosus Klug & Erichson, 1842; Rhyssemus martini Petrovitz, 1963; Rhyssemus rugatus Wollaston, 1867

Species of beetle

Rhyssemus granosus is a species of beetle of the family Scarabaeidae. It is found in Cameroon, Chad, Cape Verde, Ethiopia, Kenya, Mali, Mauritania, Niger, Nigeria, Senegal, Somalia, Sudan, Tanzania, Egypt, Kuwait, Oman, Qatar, Saudi Arabia, the United Arab Emirates and Yemen.

== Description ==
Adults reach a length of about 3–3.6 mm (0.12–0.14 in). They have a quite strongly convex, moderately shiny, black or blackish-brown body, with the frontal margin of the head and the legs reddish-brown.
