= Trichiorhyssemus setulosus =

Scientific classification
- Kingdom: Animalia
- Phylum: Arthropoda
- Clade: Pancrustacea
- Class: Insecta
- Order: Coleoptera
- Suborder: Polyphaga
- Infraorder: Scarabaeiformia
- Family: Scarabaeidae
- Genus: Trichiorhyssemus
- Species: T. setulosus

Binomial name
- Trichiorhyssemus setulosus (Reitter, 1892)

Synonyms
- Rhyssemus setulosus Reitter, 1892

Species of beetle

Trichiorhyssemus setulosus is a species of beetle of the family Scarabaeidae. It is found in Italy (Sicily).

== Description ==
Adults reach a length of about 3.6–4.2 mm (0.14–0.17 in). They have a slightly convex, faintly glossy, blackish-brown body, with very short, yellowish setae on the head and pronotum, while these are somewhat longer on the elytra.
