= Trichiopsammobius =

Scientific classification
- Kingdom: Animalia
- Phylum: Arthropoda
- Clade: Pancrustacea
- Class: Insecta
- Order: Coleoptera
- Suborder: Polyphaga
- Infraorder: Scarabaeiformia
- Family: Scarabaeidae
- Subfamily: Aphodiinae
- Tribe: Psammodiini
- Genus: Trichiopsammobius; Petrovitz, 1963

Genus of beetles

Trichiopsammobius is a genus of beetles of the family Scarabaeidae.

== Species ==
- Trichiopsammobius brasiliensis Petrovitz, 1963
- Trichiopsammobius drumonti Rakovič & Mencl, 2013
