= Parapsammodius =

Scientific classification
- Domain: Eukaryota
- Kingdom: Animalia
- Phylum: Arthropoda
- Class: Insecta
- Order: Coleoptera
- Suborder: Polyphaga
- Infraorder: Scarabaeiformia
- Family: Scarabaeidae
- Tribe: Psammodiini
- Genus: Parapsammodius; Gordon & Pittino, 1992

Genus of beetles

Parapsammodius is a genus of aphodiine dung beetles in the family Scarabaeidae. There are at least four described species in Parapsammodius.

== Species ==
These four species belong to the genus Parapsammodius:

- Parapsammodius bidens (Horn, 1871)
- Parapsammodius integer (Bates, 1887)
- Parapsammodius pseudointeger Verdu, Stebnicka & Galante, 2006
- Parapsammodius puncticollis (LeConte, 1858)
