= Rhyssemus mayeti =

Scientific classification
- Kingdom: Animalia
- Phylum: Arthropoda
- Clade: Pancrustacea
- Class: Insecta
- Order: Coleoptera
- Suborder: Polyphaga
- Infraorder: Scarabaeiformia
- Family: Scarabaeidae
- Genus: Rhyssemus
- Species: R. mayeti

Binomial name
- Rhyssemus mayeti Clouët, 1901

Synonyms
- Rhyssemus mayeti schatzmayri Endrödi, 1960

Species of beetle

Rhyssemus mayeti is a species of beetle of the family Scarabaeidae. It is found in Chad, Eritrea, Ethiopia, Ghana, Ivory Coast, Kenya, Mozambique, the Democratic Republic of the Congo, Guinea, Rwanda, Sao Thomé, Senegal, Sudan and Egypt.

== Description ==
Adults reach a length of about 3–3.8 mm (0.12–0.15 in). They have an elongate, moderately convex, blackish-brown body, with the front of the head, the anterior angles of the pronotum and the legs reddish-brown.
