= Rhyssemus verrucosus =

Scientific classification
- Kingdom: Animalia
- Phylum: Arthropoda
- Clade: Pancrustacea
- Class: Insecta
- Order: Coleoptera
- Suborder: Polyphaga
- Infraorder: Scarabaeiformia
- Family: Scarabaeidae
- Genus: Rhyssemus
- Species: R. verrucosus

Binomial name
- Rhyssemus verrucosus Mulsant, 1842

Species of beetle

Rhyssemus verrucosus is a species of beetle of the family Scarabaeidae. It is found in France, Italy, Italy, Sicily, Morocco and Spain.

== Description ==
Adults reach a length of about 2.7–3.3 mm (0.11–0.13 in). They have an elongate-oval, strongly convex, moderately shiny body. The anterior part of the head and the legs are light reddish-brown.
