= Neorhyssemus lineatus =

Scientific classification
- Kingdom: Animalia
- Phylum: Arthropoda
- Clade: Pancrustacea
- Class: Insecta
- Order: Coleoptera
- Suborder: Polyphaga
- Infraorder: Scarabaeiformia
- Family: Scarabaeidae
- Genus: Neorhyssemus
- Species: N. lineatus

Binomial name
- Neorhyssemus lineatus (Gordon & Cartwright, 1980)

Synonyms
- Rhyssemus lineatus Gordon & Cartwright, 1980

Species of beetle

Neorhyssemus lineatus is a species of beetle of the family Scarabaeidae. It is found in Brazil (Amazonas, Mato Grosso).

== Description ==
Adults reach a length of about 1.7–2 mm (0.067–0.079 in). The head is tuberculate and the clypeus emarginate. The frontoclypeal suture is furrowed and sinuate. The pronotum has a second transverse ridge interrupted medially by a longitudinal furrow. The longitudinal ridges are not joined anteriorly. The elytra have costate interstriae, and the costae are rounded.

== Life history ==
Specimens were collected in the Amazon rainforest.
