= Rhyssemus birmensis =

Scientific classification
- Kingdom: Animalia
- Phylum: Arthropoda
- Clade: Pancrustacea
- Class: Insecta
- Order: Coleoptera
- Suborder: Polyphaga
- Infraorder: Scarabaeiformia
- Family: Scarabaeidae
- Genus: Rhyssemus
- Species: R. birmensis

Binomial name
- Rhyssemus birmensis Clouët, 1901

Species of beetle

Rhyssemus birmensis is a species of beetle of the family Scarabaeidae. It is found in Myanmar.

== Description ==
Adults reach a length of about 2.9 mm (0.11 in). They have an elongate, fairly parallel-sided, not strongly convex, rather smooth, blackish-brown body, with lighter legs.
