= Leiopsammodius litoralis =

Scientific classification
- Kingdom: Animalia
- Phylum: Arthropoda
- Clade: Pancrustacea
- Class: Insecta
- Order: Coleoptera
- Suborder: Polyphaga
- Infraorder: Scarabaeiformia
- Family: Scarabaeidae
- Genus: Leiopsammodius
- Species: L. litoralis

Binomial name
- Leiopsammodius litoralis (Lea, 1923)

Synonyms
- Psammodius litoralis Lea, 1923

Species of beetle

Leiopsammodius litoralis is a species of beetle of the family Scarabaeidae. It is found in Australia (New South Wales).
