= Leiopsammodius malkini =

Scientific classification
- Kingdom: Animalia
- Phylum: Arthropoda
- Clade: Pancrustacea
- Class: Insecta
- Order: Coleoptera
- Suborder: Polyphaga
- Infraorder: Scarabaeiformia
- Family: Scarabaeidae
- Genus: Leiopsammodius
- Species: L. malkini

Binomial name
- Leiopsammodius malkini (Cartwright, 1946)

Synonyms
- Psammodius malkini Cartwright, 1946

Species of beetle

Leiopsammodius malkini is a species of aphodiine dung beetle in the family Scarabaeidae. It is found in the United States (Florida).

== Description ==
Adults reach a length of about 2.8–3.3 mm (0.11–0.13 in). They have an oval, rufo-castaneous body.
