= Leiopsammodius deyrupi =

Scientific classification
- Kingdom: Animalia
- Phylum: Arthropoda
- Clade: Pancrustacea
- Class: Insecta
- Order: Coleoptera
- Suborder: Polyphaga
- Infraorder: Scarabaeiformia
- Family: Scarabaeidae
- Genus: Leiopsammodius
- Species: L. deyrupi

Binomial name
- Leiopsammodius deyrupi Harpootlian, Gordon & Woodruff, 2000

Species of beetle

Leiopsammodius deyrupi is a species of beetle of the family Scarabaeidae. It is found in the United States (Florida).

== Description ==
Adults reach a length of about 2.8–3.3 mm (0.11–0.13 in). They have an oblong-oval, subparallel, moderately shining, rufo-castaneous body, with the antennae paler.

== Etymology ==
The species is named in honour of Mark Deyrup, who collected the first specimens of the species.
