= Neorhyssemus quinquecostatus =

Scientific classification
- Kingdom: Animalia
- Phylum: Arthropoda
- Clade: Pancrustacea
- Class: Insecta
- Order: Coleoptera
- Suborder: Polyphaga
- Infraorder: Scarabaeiformia
- Family: Scarabaeidae
- Genus: Neorhyssemus
- Species: N. quinquecostatus

Binomial name
- Neorhyssemus quinquecostatus (Schmidt, 1911)

Synonyms
- Rhyssemus quinquecostatus Schmidt, 1911

Species of beetle

Neorhyssemus quinquecostatus is a species of beetle of the family Scarabaeidae. It is found in Brazil (Amazonas, Mato Grosso).

== Description ==
Adults reach a length of about 1.9–2.1 mm (0.075–0.083 in). The clypeus is emarginate and the frontoclypeal suture is furrowed and sinuate. The transverse ridges on the pronotum are widely separated with a second transverse ridge not interrupted medially. The longitudinal ridges are joined anteriorly. The elytra have thick costae.
