= Odontopsammodius cruentus =

Scientific classification
- Domain: Eukaryota
- Kingdom: Animalia
- Phylum: Arthropoda
- Class: Insecta
- Order: Coleoptera
- Suborder: Polyphaga
- Infraorder: Scarabaeiformia
- Family: Scarabaeidae
- Genus: Odontopsammodius
- Species: O. cruentus

Binomial name
- Odontopsammodius cruentus (Harold, 1867)

Synonyms
- Psammodius shermani Cartwright, 1946

Species of beetle

Odontopsammodius cruentus is a species of aphodiine dung beetle in the family Scarabaeidae. It is found in North America and South America.
