= Leiopsammodius soledadei =

Scientific classification
- Kingdom: Animalia
- Phylum: Arthropoda
- Clade: Pancrustacea
- Class: Insecta
- Order: Coleoptera
- Suborder: Polyphaga
- Infraorder: Scarabaeiformia
- Family: Scarabaeidae
- Genus: Leiopsammodius
- Species: L. soledadei

Binomial name
- Leiopsammodius soledadei (Petrovitz, 1961)

Synonyms
- Psammobius soledadei Petrovitz, 1961

Species of beetle

Leiopsammodius soledadei is a species of beetle of the family Scarabaeidae. It is found in Brazil (Bahia).

== Description ==
Adults reach a length of about 3.1 mm (0.12 in). The clypeus is emarginate and the frontoclypeal suture is indistinct. The pronotum is not punctate, but has three transverse furrows. The transverse ridges are flat and wide with fine and scattered punctures and the lateral margins are finely fimbriate. The elytra have the humeral region covered with a few long and fine setae. The interstriae are strongly convex, smooth and not punctate.
