= Leiopsammodius manaosi =

Scientific classification
- Kingdom: Animalia
- Phylum: Arthropoda
- Clade: Pancrustacea
- Class: Insecta
- Order: Coleoptera
- Suborder: Polyphaga
- Infraorder: Scarabaeiformia
- Family: Scarabaeidae
- Genus: Leiopsammodius
- Species: L. manaosi

Binomial name
- Leiopsammodius manaosi (Cartwright, 1955)

Synonyms
- Psammodius manaosi Cartwright, 1955

Species of beetle

Leiopsammodius manaosi is a species of beetle of the family Scarabaeidae. It is found in Brazil (Amazonas).

== Description ==
Adults reach a length of about 2.5 mm (0.098 in). The body is ferruginous. The frons is coarsely punctured and the clypeus is emarginate and without teeth. The pronotum has the posterior angles obtusely rounded and the sides are not fimbriate nor crenulate. There are three transverse furrows and a medial longitudinal furrow on the surface. The elytra have a fine humeral tooth and the striae are somewhat shallow. The punctures are fine, and the interstriae are weakly crenating. The abdominal ventrites are crenulate anteriorly.
