= Odontopsammodius =

Scientific classification
- Kingdom: Animalia
- Phylum: Arthropoda
- Clade: Pancrustacea
- Class: Insecta
- Order: Coleoptera
- Suborder: Polyphaga
- Infraorder: Scarabaeiformia
- Family: Scarabaeidae
- Tribe: Psammodiini
- Genus: Odontopsammodius; Gordon & Pittino, 1992

Genus of beetles

Odontopsammodius is a genus of aphodiine dung beetles in the family Scarabaeidae. There are about 12 described species in Odontopsammodius.

== Species ==
These 12 species belong to the genus Odontopsammodius:

- Odontopsammodius aenictus (Cartwright, 1955)
- Odontopsammodius armaticeps (Fall, 1932)
- Odontopsammodius atopus (Cartwright, 1955)
- Odontopsammodius brunneus (Balthasar, 1961)
- Odontopsammodius cameneni (Chalumeau, 1976)
- Odontopsammodius chipiririi (Cartwright, 1955)
- Odontopsammodius cruentus (Harold, 1867)
- Odontopsammodius decuiella (Chalumeau, 1979)
- Odontopsammodius fimbriatus (Cartwright, 1955)
- Odontopsammodius formosus (Cartwright, 1955)
- Odontopsammodius insulcatus (Schmidt, 1916)
- Odontopsammodius mapirii (Cartwright, 1955)
