= Parapsammodius puncticollis =

Scientific classification
- Domain: Eukaryota
- Kingdom: Animalia
- Phylum: Arthropoda
- Class: Insecta
- Order: Coleoptera
- Suborder: Polyphaga
- Infraorder: Scarabaeiformia
- Family: Scarabaeidae
- Genus: Parapsammodius
- Species: P. puncticollis

Binomial name
- Parapsammodius puncticollis (LeConte, 1858)

Synonyms
- Ataenius inops Horn, 1887

Species of beetle

Parapsammodius puncticollis is a species of aphodiine dung beetle in the family Scarabaeidae. It is found in Central America and North America.
