= Rhyssemus bilyi =

Scientific classification
- Kingdom: Animalia
- Phylum: Arthropoda
- Clade: Pancrustacea
- Class: Insecta
- Order: Coleoptera
- Suborder: Polyphaga
- Infraorder: Scarabaeiformia
- Family: Scarabaeidae
- Genus: Rhyssemus
- Species: R. bilyi

Binomial name
- Rhyssemus bilyi Rakovic, 2001

Species of beetle

Rhyssemus bilyi is a species of beetle of the family Scarabaeidae. It is found in New Caledonia.
