= Psammorpha =

Scientific classification
- Kingdom: Animalia
- Phylum: Arthropoda
- Clade: Pancrustacea
- Class: Insecta
- Order: Coleoptera
- Suborder: Polyphaga
- Infraorder: Scarabaeiformia
- Family: Scarabaeidae
- Subfamily: Aphodiinae
- Tribe: Psammodiini
- Genus: Psammorpha; Stebnicka, 1994
- Species: P. lawrencei

Binomial name
- Psammorpha lawrencei Stebnicka, 1994

Genus of beetles

Psammorpha is a genus of beetle of the family Scarabaeidae. It is monotypic, being represented by the single species, Psammorpha lawrencei, which is found on Christmas Island.

== Description ==
Adults reach a length of about 3.8 mm (0.15 in). They have a short oval, convex, glabrous, shining black body, with the sides of the clypeus and anterior median area of the pronotum reddish. They are flightless and blind.
