= Rhyssemus granulosus =

Scientific classification
- Kingdom: Animalia
- Phylum: Arthropoda
- Clade: Pancrustacea
- Class: Insecta
- Order: Coleoptera
- Suborder: Polyphaga
- Infraorder: Scarabaeiformia
- Family: Scarabaeidae
- Genus: Rhyssemus
- Species: R. granulosus

Binomial name
- Rhyssemus granulosus Ballion, 1871

Synonyms
- Rhyssemus granosus Motschulsky, 1863

Species of beetle

Rhyssemus granulosus is a species of beetle of the family Scarabaeidae. It is found in Sri Lanka.

== Description ==
Adults reach a length of about 2.5 mm (0.098 in). They have an elongate, slightly glossy, black body, with the anterior angles of the pronotum reddish.
