= Trichiorhyssemus riparius =

Scientific classification
- Kingdom: Animalia
- Phylum: Arthropoda
- Clade: Pancrustacea
- Class: Insecta
- Order: Coleoptera
- Suborder: Polyphaga
- Infraorder: Scarabaeiformia
- Family: Scarabaeidae
- Genus: Trichiorhyssemus
- Species: T. riparius

Binomial name
- Trichiorhyssemus riparius (Horn, 1871)

Synonyms
- Rhyssemus riparius Horn, 1871; Rhyssemus caelatus LeConte, 1881

Species of beetle

Trichiorhyssemus riparius is a species of aphodiine dung beetle in the family Scarabaeidae. It is found in the United States (Arizona, California, Colorado, New Mexico, Utah).
