= Rhyssemus marqueti =

Scientific classification
- Kingdom: Animalia
- Phylum: Arthropoda
- Clade: Pancrustacea
- Class: Insecta
- Order: Coleoptera
- Suborder: Polyphaga
- Infraorder: Scarabaeiformia
- Family: Scarabaeidae
- Genus: Rhyssemus
- Species: R. marqueti

Binomial name
- Rhyssemus marqueti Reiche, 1863

Synonyms
- Rhyssemus pyrenaeus Balthasar, 1961

Species of beetle

Rhyssemus marqueti is a species of beetle of the family Scarabaeidae. It is found in France and Spain.

== Description ==
Adults reach a length of about 4.2–4.4 mm (0.17–0.17 in). They have a nearly parallel-sided, strongly convex, moderately shiny to semi-dull, black body, with the anterior margin of the clypeus and legs dark reddish-brown.
