= Leiopsammodius desertorum =

Scientific classification
- Kingdom: Animalia
- Phylum: Arthropoda
- Clade: Pancrustacea
- Class: Insecta
- Order: Coleoptera
- Suborder: Polyphaga
- Infraorder: Scarabaeiformia
- Family: Scarabaeidae
- Genus: Leiopsammodius
- Species: L. desertorum

Binomial name
- Leiopsammodius desertorum (Fairmaire, 1868)

Synonyms
- Aegialia desertorum Fairmaire, 1868

Species of beetle

Leiopsammodius desertorum is a species of beetle of the family Scarabaeidae. It is found in Algeria, Libya and Sudan.

== Description ==
Adults reach a length of about 3 mm (0.12 in).
