= Rhyssemus cantabricus =

Scientific classification
- Kingdom: Animalia
- Phylum: Arthropoda
- Clade: Pancrustacea
- Class: Insecta
- Order: Coleoptera
- Suborder: Polyphaga
- Infraorder: Scarabaeiformia
- Family: Scarabaeidae
- Genus: Rhyssemus
- Species: R. cantabricus

Binomial name
- Rhyssemus cantabricus Balthasar, 1961

Species of beetle

Rhyssemus cantabricus is a species of beetle of the family Scarabaeidae. It is found in Spain.

== Description ==
Adults reach a length of about 3–3.3 mm (0.12–0.13 in). They have a fairly glossy, black body, with the anterior margin of the clypeus and the legs dark reddish-brown.
