= Leiopsammodius placidus =

Scientific classification
- Kingdom: Animalia
- Phylum: Arthropoda
- Clade: Pancrustacea
- Class: Insecta
- Order: Coleoptera
- Suborder: Polyphaga
- Infraorder: Scarabaeiformia
- Family: Scarabaeidae
- Genus: Leiopsammodius
- Species: L. placidus

Binomial name
- Leiopsammodius placidus (Schmidt, 1910)

Synonyms
- Psammobius placidus Schmidt, 1910

Species of beetle

Leiopsammodius placidus is a species of beetle of the family Scarabaeidae. It is found in Argentina.

== Description ==
Adults reach a length of about 3 mm (0.12 in). They have an oval, glossy, dark reddish-brown body, which is lighter on the sides of the elytra.
