= Aphodopsammobius =

Scientific classification
- Kingdom: Animalia
- Phylum: Arthropoda
- Clade: Pancrustacea
- Class: Insecta
- Order: Coleoptera
- Suborder: Polyphaga
- Infraorder: Scarabaeiformia
- Family: Scarabaeidae
- Subfamily: Aphodiinae
- Tribe: Psammodiini
- Genus: Aphodopsammobius; Endrödi, 1964

Genus of beetles

Aphodopsammobius is a genus of beetles of the family Scarabaeidae.

== Species ==
- Aphodopsammobius australicus (Blackburn, 1904)
- Aphodopsammobius demarzi (Petrovitz, 1964)
- Aphodopsammobius mirabilis Endrödi, 1964
- Aphodopsammobius rugicollis (MacLeay, 1888)
- Aphodopsammobius zietzi (Blackburn, 1895)
