= Neomyrhessus =

Scientific classification
- Kingdom: Animalia
- Phylum: Arthropoda
- Clade: Pancrustacea
- Class: Insecta
- Order: Coleoptera
- Suborder: Polyphaga
- Infraorder: Scarabaeiformia
- Family: Scarabaeidae
- Subfamily: Aphodiinae
- Tribe: Psammodiini
- Genus: Neomyrhessus; Minkina, 2024

Genus of beetles

Neomyrhessus is a genus of beetles of the family Scarabaeidae.

== Species ==
- Neomyrhessus hiroshii Ochi, Kawahara & Inagaki, 2025
- Neomyrhessus kubotai (Ochi, Kawahara & Inagaki, 2012)
- Neomyrhessus mimurai (Ochi & Kawahara, 2024)
- Neomyrhessus nanjingensis Minkina, 2024
- Neomyrhessus nishinoi (Ochi, Kawahara & Inagaki, 2012)
- Neomyrhessus samurai (Balthasar, 1941)
- Neomyrhessus sunadai (Ochi, Kawahara & Inagaki, 2019)
- Neomyrhessus yorikoae (Ochi, Kawahara & Inagaki, 2006)
