= Leiopsammodius santaremi =

Scientific classification
- Kingdom: Animalia
- Phylum: Arthropoda
- Clade: Pancrustacea
- Class: Insecta
- Order: Coleoptera
- Suborder: Polyphaga
- Infraorder: Scarabaeiformia
- Family: Scarabaeidae
- Genus: Leiopsammodius
- Species: L. santaremi

Binomial name
- Leiopsammodius santaremi (Cartwright, 1955)

Synonyms
- Psammodius santaremi Cartwright, 1955

Species of beetle

Leiopsammodius santaremi is a species of beetle of the family Scarabaeidae. It is found in Brazil (Pará).

== Description ==
Adults reach a length of about 2.5 mm (0.098 in). The body is ferruginous. The head is emarginate and the frons has three to four coarse punctures on each side near the frontoclypeal suture. The pronotum has three transverse furrows. The humeral region of the elytra is finely denticulate and the lateral margin is not fringed. The striae are wide and deep and have moderate punctures, while the interstriae are strongly crenate.
