= Rhyssemus sculptilipennis =

Scientific classification
- Kingdom: Animalia
- Phylum: Arthropoda
- Clade: Pancrustacea
- Class: Insecta
- Order: Coleoptera
- Suborder: Polyphaga
- Infraorder: Scarabaeiformia
- Family: Scarabaeidae
- Genus: Rhyssemus
- Species: R. sculptilipennis

Binomial name
- Rhyssemus sculptilipennis Schmidt, 1922

Synonyms
- Rhyssemus ignobilis Endrödi, 1964; Rhyssemus nigeriensis Petrovitz, 1958; Rhyssemus sculptipennis Schmidt, 1917; Rhyssemus reitteri Clouët, 1901; Rhyssemus falsus Balthasar, 1965

Species of beetle

Rhyssemus sculptilipennis is a species of beetle of the family Scarabaeidae. It is found in Indonesia (Java), Madagascar, Ghana, Ivory Coast, Democratic Republic of the Congo, Sudan and Tanzania.

== Description ==
Adults reach a length of about 2.7–3 mm (0.11–0.12 in). They have an elongate, quite strongly convex, black body, with the anterior margin of the head and the anterior angles of the pronotum reddish-brown.

== Subspecies ==
- Rhyssemus sculptilipennis sculptilipennis (Indonesia (Java), Madagascar, Ghana, Ivory Coast, Democratic Republic of the Congo, Sudan)
- Rhyssemus sculptilipennis falsus Balthasar, 1965 (Tanzania)
