= Sicardia psammodiformis =

Scientific classification
- Kingdom: Animalia
- Phylum: Arthropoda
- Clade: Pancrustacea
- Class: Insecta
- Order: Coleoptera
- Suborder: Polyphaga
- Infraorder: Scarabaeiformia
- Family: Scarabaeidae
- Genus: Sicardia
- Species: S. psammodiformis

Binomial name
- Sicardia psammodiformis Reitter, 1896

Species of beetle

Sicardia psammodiformis is a species of beetle of the family Scarabaeidae. It is found in Tunisia and Libya.

== Description ==
Adults reach a length of about 2.6–3 mm (0.10–0.12 in). They have a strongly convex, highly glossy, reddish-brown body.
