= Rhyssemus scaber =

Scientific classification
- Kingdom: Animalia
- Phylum: Arthropoda
- Clade: Pancrustacea
- Class: Insecta
- Order: Coleoptera
- Suborder: Polyphaga
- Infraorder: Scarabaeiformia
- Family: Scarabaeidae
- Genus: Rhyssemus
- Species: R. scaber

Binomial name
- Rhyssemus scaber Haldeman, 1848

Species of beetle

Rhyssemus scaber is a species of aphodiine dung beetle in the family Scarabaeidae. It is found in the United States (Colorado, Delawara, Maryland, New Jersey, New York, North Carolina, Rhode Island, Virginia and possibly Florida).
