= Leiopsammodius newcastleensis =

Scientific classification
- Kingdom: Animalia
- Phylum: Arthropoda
- Clade: Pancrustacea
- Class: Insecta
- Order: Coleoptera
- Suborder: Polyphaga
- Infraorder: Scarabaeiformia
- Family: Scarabaeidae
- Genus: Leiopsammodius
- Species: L. newcastleensis

Binomial name
- Leiopsammodius newcastleensis Stebnicka & Howden, 1996

Species of beetle

Leiopsammodius newcastleensis is a species of beetle of the family Scarabaeidae. It is found in Australia (New South Wales).

== Description ==
Adults reach a length of about 2.6 mm (0.10 in). They have a short oval, shining, yellowish-brown body.

== Life history ==
This species has been collected on (and is probably restricted to) sandy beaches.
