= Rakovicius =

Scientific classification
- Kingdom: Animalia
- Phylum: Arthropoda
- Clade: Pancrustacea
- Class: Insecta
- Order: Coleoptera
- Suborder: Polyphaga
- Infraorder: Scarabaeiformia
- Family: Scarabaeidae
- Subfamily: Aphodiinae
- Tribe: Psammodiini
- Genus: Rakovicius; Pittino, 2006

Genus of beetles

Rakovicius is a genus of beetles of the family Scarabaeidae.

== Species ==
- Rakovicius ainu (Lewis, 1895)
- Rakovicius coreanus (Kim, 1980)
- Rakovicius kyotoensis Ochi, Kawahara & Inagaki, 2019
- Rakovicius lanae Masumoto, 2012
- Rakovicius neimongolensis Minkina & Skelley, 2025
- Rakovicius sagaingensis Minkina & Skelley, 2025
- Rakovicius subopacus (Nomura, 1973)
- Rakovicius takashii Ochi, Kawahara & Inagaki, 2019
- Rakovicius thailandicus (Balthasar, 1965)
