= Neotrichiorhyssemus malabaricus =

Scientific classification
- Kingdom: Animalia
- Phylum: Arthropoda
- Clade: Pancrustacea
- Class: Insecta
- Order: Coleoptera
- Suborder: Polyphaga
- Infraorder: Scarabaeiformia
- Family: Scarabaeidae
- Genus: Neotrichiorhyssemus
- Species: N. malabaricus

Binomial name
- Neotrichiorhyssemus malabaricus (Balthasar, 1963)

Synonyms
- Trichiorhyssemus malabaricus Balthasar, 1963

Species of beetle

Neotrichiorhyssemus malabaricus is a species of beetle of the family Scarabaeidae. It is found in Indonesia (Java) and India (Kerala).

== Description ==
Adults reach a length of about 3.3 mm (0.13 in). They have an elongate, nearly parallel-sided, convex, dull, black body, with dark brown legs.
