= Sicardia =

Scientific classification
- Kingdom: Animalia
- Phylum: Arthropoda
- Clade: Pancrustacea
- Class: Insecta
- Order: Coleoptera
- Suborder: Polyphaga
- Infraorder: Scarabaeiformia
- Family: Scarabaeidae
- Subfamily: Aphodiinae
- Tribe: Psammodiini
- Genus: Sicardia; Reitter, 1896

Synonyms
- Bipammosus Normand, 1938

Genus of beetles

Sicardia is a genus of beetles of the family Scarabaeidae.

== Species ==
- Sicardia boiteli (Normand, 1938)
- Sicardia psammodiformis Reitter, 1896
