= Leiopsammodius indicus =

Scientific classification
- Kingdom: Animalia
- Phylum: Arthropoda
- Clade: Pancrustacea
- Class: Insecta
- Order: Coleoptera
- Suborder: Polyphaga
- Infraorder: Scarabaeiformia
- Family: Scarabaeidae
- Genus: Leiopsammodius
- Species: L. indicus

Binomial name
- Leiopsammodius indicus (Harold, 1877)

Synonyms
- Psammobius indicus Harold, 1877; Psammodius sculpticollis Fairmaire, 1897

Species of beetle

Leiopsammodius indicus is a species of beetle of the family Scarabaeidae. It is found in Ethiopia, Kenya, Malawi, the Democratic Republic of the Congo, the Republic of the Congo, South Africa, Sudan, Tanzania, India, Indonesia (Java, Sumatra, Sulawesi), Sri Lanka, Vietnam, Yemen, Pakistan, Taiwan, the United Arab Emirates and Madagascar.

== Description ==
Adults reach a length of about 3–3.5 mm (0.12–0.14 in). They have a slender, oval, reddish-brown body, with the sides of the pronotum and the elytra somewhat lighter.
