= Rhyssemus purkynei =

Scientific classification
- Kingdom: Animalia
- Phylum: Arthropoda
- Clade: Pancrustacea
- Class: Insecta
- Order: Coleoptera
- Suborder: Polyphaga
- Infraorder: Scarabaeiformia
- Family: Scarabaeidae
- Genus: Rhyssemus
- Species: R. purkynei

Binomial name
- Rhyssemus purkynei Balthasar, 1961

Species of beetle

Rhyssemus purkynei is a species of beetle of the family Scarabaeidae. It is found in Spain.

== Description ==
Adults reach a length of about 3–3.3 mm (0.12–0.13 in). They have a fairly parallel-sided, moderately shiny body. The head and pronotum are blackish-brown, while the elytra are either lighter or darker reddish-brown.
