= Rhyssemus ritsemae =

Scientific classification
- Kingdom: Animalia
- Phylum: Arthropoda
- Clade: Pancrustacea
- Class: Insecta
- Order: Coleoptera
- Suborder: Polyphaga
- Infraorder: Scarabaeiformia
- Family: Scarabaeidae
- Genus: Rhyssemus
- Species: R. ritsemae

Binomial name
- Rhyssemus ritsemae Clouët, 1901

Synonyms
- Rhyssemus costulatus Clouët, 1910

Species of beetle

Rhyssemus ritsemae is a species of beetle of the family Scarabaeidae. It is found in Angola, Burkina Faso, Cameroon, Chad, Ethiopia, Ghana, Guinea-Bissau, Ivory Coast, Liberia, Mozambique, Namibia, Niger, Nigeria, the Democratic Republic of the Congo, Guinea, the Republic of the Congo, Rwanda, Senegal, Sierra Leone, Somalia, Sudan and Togo.

== Description ==
Adults reach a length of about 2.8–3 mm (0.11–0.12 in). They have an elongate, moderately convex, black or blackish-brown body, with little luster. The legs are lighter reddish-brown.
