= Rhyssemus falcatus =

Scientific classification
- Kingdom: Animalia
- Phylum: Arthropoda
- Clade: Pancrustacea
- Class: Insecta
- Order: Coleoptera
- Suborder: Polyphaga
- Infraorder: Scarabaeiformia
- Family: Scarabaeidae
- Genus: Rhyssemus
- Species: R. falcatus

Binomial name
- Rhyssemus falcatus Petrovitz, 1961

Species of beetle

Rhyssemus falcatus is a species of beetle of the family Scarabaeidae. It is found in India (Jammu & Kashmir) and Pakistan.

== Description ==
Adults reach a length of about 3.5–4 mm (0.14–0.16 in). They have a convex, slightly glossy, black body, with the elytra sometimes dark reddish-brown. The anterior margin of the clypeus and the legs are reddish-brown to yellowish-brown.
