= Rhyssemus histrio =

Scientific classification
- Kingdom: Animalia
- Phylum: Arthropoda
- Clade: Pancrustacea
- Class: Insecta
- Order: Coleoptera
- Suborder: Polyphaga
- Infraorder: Scarabaeiformia
- Family: Scarabaeidae
- Genus: Rhyssemus
- Species: R. histrio

Binomial name
- Rhyssemus histrio Balthasar, 1961

Species of beetle

Rhyssemus histrio is a species of beetle of the family Scarabaeidae. It is found in Afghanistan, Azerbaijan, Iran and Turkmenistan.

== Description ==
Adults reach a length of about 4 mm (0.16 in). They have a fairly parallel-sided, moderately convex, dull body. The head and pronotum are dark brown, while the elytra and legs are reddish-brown.
