= Orocanthus =

Scientific classification
- Kingdom: Animalia
- Phylum: Arthropoda
- Clade: Pancrustacea
- Class: Insecta
- Order: Coleoptera
- Suborder: Polyphaga
- Infraorder: Scarabaeiformia
- Family: Scarabaeidae
- Subfamily: Aphodiinae
- Tribe: Psammodiini
- Genus: Orocanthus; Endrödi, 1983
- Species: O. helenae

Binomial name
- Orocanthus helenae (Endrödi, 1983)

Synonyms
- Aphodius (Orocanthus) helenae Endrödi, 1983

Genus of beetles

Orocanthus is a genus of beetle of the family Scarabaeidae. It is monotypic, being represented by the single species, Orocanthus helenae, which is found in South Africa (Cape).

== Description ==
Adults reach a length of about 2.5–3 mm (0.098–0.118 in). They have a shiny, black body, with the apex of the clypeus, antennae (except for the black club), sides of the elytra and legs light.
