= Rhyssemus blackburnei =

Scientific classification
- Kingdom: Animalia
- Phylum: Arthropoda
- Clade: Pancrustacea
- Class: Insecta
- Order: Coleoptera
- Suborder: Polyphaga
- Infraorder: Scarabaeiformia
- Family: Scarabaeidae
- Genus: Rhyssemus
- Species: R. blackburnei

Binomial name
- Rhyssemus blackburnei Clouët, 1901

Synonyms
- Rhyssemus rhizophagus Lea, 1923

Species of beetle

Rhyssemus blackburnei is a species of beetle of the family Scarabaeidae. It is found in Australia (Western Australia).
