= Rhyssemodes orientalis =

Scientific classification
- Kingdom: Animalia
- Phylum: Arthropoda
- Clade: Pancrustacea
- Class: Insecta
- Order: Coleoptera
- Suborder: Polyphaga
- Infraorder: Scarabaeiformia
- Family: Scarabaeidae
- Genus: Rhyssemodes
- Species: R. orientalis

Binomial name
- Rhyssemodes orientalis (Mulsant & Godart, 1874)

Synonyms
- Rhyssemus orientalis Mulsant & Godart, 1874; Rhyssemodes aspericeps Reitter, 1892; Rhyssemodes koltzei Petrovitz; Rhyssemus bremeri Endrödi, 1979; Rhyssemodes parvus Balthasar, 1963; Rhyssemodes reitteri Orbigny, 1896; Rhyssemodes transversus Reitter, 1892; Rhyssemus hybridus Reitter, 1892; Rhyssemus obsoletus Reitter, 1887; Rhyssemus gemmifer Marseul, 1878; Rhyssemus aspericeps Chevrolat, 1861

Species of beetle

Rhyssemodes orientalis is a species of beetle of the family Scarabaeidae. It is found in Afghanistan, Algeria, Armenia, Azerbaijan, the Canary Islands, China (Qinghai, Xinjiang), Egypt, Iran, Israel, Kazakhstan, Lebanon, Libya, Mongolia, Morocco, Russia (including the Russian Far East), Saudi Arabia, Spain, Tajikistan, Tunisia, Turkey, Turkmenistan, the United Arab Emirates, Uzbekistan, Ethiopia, Eritrea, Mauritania and Sudan.

== Description ==
Adults reach a length of about 3–3.8 mm (0.12–0.15 in). They have an elongate, glossy body. The head and pronotum are blackish-brown, while the elytra are sometimes dark reddish-brown. The anterior margin of the head, the anterior angles of the pronotum and the legs are lighter reddish-brown.
