= Geopsammodius unsidensis =

Scientific classification
- Domain: Eukaryota
- Kingdom: Animalia
- Phylum: Arthropoda
- Class: Insecta
- Order: Coleoptera
- Suborder: Polyphaga
- Infraorder: Scarabaeiformia
- Family: Scarabaeidae
- Genus: Geopsammodius
- Species: G. unsidensis

Binomial name
- Geopsammodius unsidensis Skelley, 2006

Species of beetle

Geopsammodius unsidensis is a species of aphodiine dung beetle in the family Scarabaeidae. It is found in North America.
