= Rhyssemus macedonicus =

Scientific classification
- Kingdom: Animalia
- Phylum: Arthropoda
- Clade: Pancrustacea
- Class: Insecta
- Order: Coleoptera
- Suborder: Polyphaga
- Infraorder: Scarabaeiformia
- Family: Scarabaeidae
- Genus: Rhyssemus
- Species: R. macedonicus

Binomial name
- Rhyssemus macedonicus Balthasar, 1960

Species of beetle

Rhyssemus macedonicus is a species of beetle of the family Scarabaeidae. It is found in Greece, Turkey and possibly Iran.

== Description ==
Adults reach a length of about 3 mm (0.12 in). They have an almost parallel-sided, convex, rather shiny, blackish-brown to black body.
