= Pararhyssemus =

Scientific classification
- Kingdom: Animalia
- Phylum: Arthropoda
- Clade: Pancrustacea
- Class: Insecta
- Order: Coleoptera
- Suborder: Polyphaga
- Infraorder: Scarabaeiformia
- Family: Scarabaeidae
- Subfamily: Aphodiinae
- Tribe: Psammodiini
- Genus: Pararhyssemus; Balthasar, 1955
- Species: P. coluber

Binomial name
- Pararhyssemus coluber (Mayet, 1887)

Synonyms
- Rhyssemus coluber Mayet, 1887; Pararhyssemus paradoxus Balthasar, 1955; Rhyssemus parisii Balthasar, 1939; Rhyssemus caesoides Reitter, 1894; Rhyssemus laesifrons Fairmaire, 1892

Genus of beetles

Pararhyssemus is a genus of beetle of the family Scarabaeidae. It is monotypic, being represented by the single species, Pararhyssemus coluber, which is found in Afghanistan, Algeria, Egypt, Iran, Libya, Morocco, Oman, Saudi Arabia, Tunisia, Turkmenistan, the United Arab Emirates, Yemen, Eritrea, Ethiopia, Kenya, Niger, Somalia and India (Rajasthan).

== Description ==
Adults reach a length of about 2.8–3.5 mm (0.11–0.14 in). They have a narrow, parallel-sided, reddish-brown body, with the head and disc of the pronotum darker.
