= Rhyssemus koreanus =

Scientific classification
- Kingdom: Animalia
- Phylum: Arthropoda
- Clade: Pancrustacea
- Class: Insecta
- Order: Coleoptera
- Suborder: Polyphaga
- Infraorder: Scarabaeiformia
- Family: Scarabaeidae
- Genus: Rhyssemus
- Species: R. koreanus

Binomial name
- Rhyssemus koreanus Stebnicka, 1980

Species of beetle

Rhyssemus koreanus is a species of beetle of the family Scarabaeidae. It is found in North Korea.

== Description ==
Adults reach a length of about 2.8–3 mm (0.11–0.12 in). They have an elongate, quadrate, shiny, black body, with the margin of the clypeus and the ventral surface red.
