= Trichiorhyssemus =

Scientific classification
- Kingdom: Animalia
- Phylum: Arthropoda
- Clade: Pancrustacea
- Class: Insecta
- Order: Coleoptera
- Suborder: Polyphaga
- Infraorder: Scarabaeiformia
- Family: Scarabaeidae
- Tribe: Psammodiini
- Genus: Trichiorhyssemus; Clouët, 1901

Genus of beetles

Trichiorhyssemus is a genus of aphodiine dung beetles in the family Scarabaeidae. There are more than 20 described species in Trichiorhyssemus.

== Species ==
These 26 species belong to the genus Trichiorhyssemus:

- Trichiorhyssemus adhabharicus (Pittino, 1983)
- Trichiorhyssemus alternatus Hinton, 1938
- Trichiorhyssemus asperulus (Waterhouse, 1875)
- Trichiorhyssemus bicolor (Clouët, 1901)
- Trichiorhyssemus bisigillatus (Bénard, 1924)
- Trichiorhyssemus cloueti Koshantschikov, 1916
- Trichiorhyssemus congolanus (Clouët, 1901)
- Trichiorhyssemus cristatellus (Bates, 1887)
- Trichiorhyssemus dalmatinus Petrovitz, 1967
- Trichiorhyssemus decorsei Bénard, 1914
- Trichiorhyssemus elegans (Petrovitz, 1963)
- Trichiorhyssemus fokiensis Petrovitz, 1968
- Trichiorhyssemus fruhstorferi Petrovitz, 1968
- Trichiorhyssemus hauseri Balthasar, 1933
- Trichiorhyssemus hispidus Pittino, 2007
- Trichiorhyssemus kitayamai Ochi, Kawahara & Kawai, 2001
- Trichiorhyssemus lasionotus Clouët, 1901
- Trichiorhyssemus longetarsalis Bénard, 1921
- Trichiorhyssemus microtrichius Ochi, Kawahara & Inagaki, 2011
- Trichiorhyssemus nepalensis (Pittino, 1983)
- Trichiorhyssemus occidentalis (Endrödi, 1976)
- Trichiorhyssemus pseudoinscitus (Pittino, 1984)
- Trichiorhyssemus riparius (Horn, 1871)
- Trichiorhyssemus setulosus (Reitter, 1892)
- Trichiorhyssemus taiwanus Ochi, Masumoto & Lee, 2015
- Trichiorhyssemus yumikoae Pittino & Kawai, 2007
