= Granulopsammodius plicatulus =

Scientific classification
- Kingdom: Animalia
- Phylum: Arthropoda
- Clade: Pancrustacea
- Class: Insecta
- Order: Coleoptera
- Suborder: Polyphaga
- Infraorder: Scarabaeiformia
- Family: Scarabaeidae
- Genus: Granulopsammodius
- Species: G. plicatulus

Binomial name
- Granulopsammodius plicatulus (Fairmaire, 1892)

Synonyms
- Psammodius plicatulus Fairmaire, 1892

Species of beetle

Granulopsammodius plicatulus is a species of beetle of the family Scarabaeidae. It is found in the Sahara, Ethiopia, Mauritania, Niger, Somalia, Sudan, Algeria, Egypt, Israel, Libya, Morocco, Oman, Saudi Arabia and Yemen.

== Description ==
Adults reach a length of about 3–3.5 mm (0.12–0.14 in). They have an elongated, glossy, yellow-red to almost reddish-brown body.
