= Neotrichiorhyssemus klapaleki =

Scientific classification
- Kingdom: Animalia
- Phylum: Arthropoda
- Clade: Pancrustacea
- Class: Insecta
- Order: Coleoptera
- Suborder: Polyphaga
- Infraorder: Scarabaeiformia
- Family: Scarabaeidae
- Genus: Neotrichiorhyssemus
- Species: N. klapaleki

Binomial name
- Neotrichiorhyssemus klapaleki (Balthasar, 1963)

Synonyms
- Trichiorhyssemus klapaleki Balthasar, 1963

Species of beetle

Neotrichiorhyssemus klapaleki is a species of beetle of the family Scarabaeidae. It is found in India (Karnataka).

== Description ==
Adults reach a length of about 3.6 mm (0.14 in). They have a rather strongly convex, slightly shiny, blackish-brown body, with the anterior margin of the head and the legs dark reddish-brown.
