= Afrodiastictus minutus =

Scientific classification
- Kingdom: Animalia
- Phylum: Arthropoda
- Clade: Pancrustacea
- Class: Insecta
- Order: Coleoptera
- Suborder: Polyphaga
- Infraorder: Scarabaeiformia
- Family: Scarabaeidae
- Genus: Afrodiastictus
- Species: A. minutus

Binomial name
- Afrodiastictus minutus (Petrovitz, 1970)

Synonyms
- Rhyssemus minutus Petrovitz, 1970

Species of beetle

Afrodiastictus minutus is a species of beetle of the family Scarabaeidae. It is found in Brazil (Acre, Roraima) and Venezuela.

== Description ==
Adults reach a length of about 1.6–1.8 mm (0.063–0.071 in). The clypeus is sinuate and tuberculate and the frontoclypeal suture is grooved. The frons is coarsely punctured. The pronotum has two distinct transverse furrows and ridges, with the third furrow (if present), weakly developed and present as a line of coarse confluent punctures.

== Life history ==
Specimens were collected at altitudes ranging from 83 to 183 metres.
