= Neopsammodius =

Scientific classification
- Domain: Eukaryota
- Kingdom: Animalia
- Phylum: Arthropoda
- Class: Insecta
- Order: Coleoptera
- Suborder: Polyphaga
- Infraorder: Scarabaeiformia
- Family: Scarabaeidae
- Tribe: Psammodiini
- Genus: Neopsammodius; Rakovic, 1986

Genus of beetles

Neopsammodius is a genus of aphodiine dung beetles in the family Scarabaeidae. There are about nine described species in Neopsammodius.

== Species ==
These nine species belong to the genus Neopsammodius:

- Neopsammodius blandus (Fall, 1932)
- Neopsammodius canoensis (Cartwright, 1955)
- Neopsammodius culminatus (Bates, 1887)
- Neopsammodius interruptus (Say, 1835)
- Neopsammodius mimeticus (Fall, 1932)
- Neopsammodius quinqueplicatus (Horn, 1871)
- Neopsammodius saltilloensis (Cartwright, 1955)
- Neopsammodius veraecrucis (Bates, 1887)
- Neopsammodius werneri (Cartwright, 1955)
