= Leiopsammodius japonicus =

Scientific classification
- Kingdom: Animalia
- Phylum: Arthropoda
- Clade: Pancrustacea
- Class: Insecta
- Order: Coleoptera
- Suborder: Polyphaga
- Infraorder: Scarabaeiformia
- Family: Scarabaeidae
- Genus: Leiopsammodius
- Species: L. japonicus

Binomial name
- Leiopsammodius japonicus (Harold, 1878)

Synonyms
- Psammobius japonicus Harold, 1878; Diastictus nomurai Tesař, 1944

Species of beetle

Leiopsammodius japonicus is a species of beetle of the family Scarabaeidae. It is found in Japan and Korea.

== Description ==
Adults reach a length of about 4–5 mm (0.16–0.20 in). They have an elongate, glossy, dark brown body.
