= Leiopsammodius acei =

Scientific classification
- Kingdom: Animalia
- Phylum: Arthropoda
- Clade: Pancrustacea
- Class: Insecta
- Order: Coleoptera
- Suborder: Polyphaga
- Infraorder: Scarabaeiformia
- Family: Scarabaeidae
- Genus: Leiopsammodius
- Species: L. acei

Binomial name
- Leiopsammodius acei Harpootlian, Gordon & Woodruff, 2000

Species of beetle

Leiopsammodius acei is a species of beetle of the family Scarabaeidae. It is found in the United States (North Carolina, South Carolina).

== Description ==
Adults reach a length of about 2.8–3.3 mm (0.11–0.13 in). They have an oblong-oval, subparallel, moderately shining, rufo-castaneous body. The antennae are pale rufo-testaceous.

== Etymology ==
The species is named for the ACE basin, a coastal wilderness area in South Carolina.
