= Neomyrhessus nanjingensis =

Scientific classification
- Kingdom: Animalia
- Phylum: Arthropoda
- Clade: Pancrustacea
- Class: Insecta
- Order: Coleoptera
- Suborder: Polyphaga
- Infraorder: Scarabaeiformia
- Family: Scarabaeidae
- Genus: Neomyrhessus
- Species: N. nanjingensis

Binomial name
- Neomyrhessus nanjingensis Minkina, 2024

Species of beetle

Neomyrhessus nanjingensis is a species of beetle of the family Scarabaeidae. It is found in China (Jiangsu).

== Description ==
Adults reach a length of about 3.2–3.3 mm (0.13–0.13 in). They have an elongate, convex, dorsally almost glabrous, black body, with the lateral margins somewhat lighter. The legs are reddish-brown, while the antennae are yellowish-brown.

== Etymology ==
The species is named after Nanjing city, where type series was collected.
