= Geopsammodius subpedalis =

Scientific classification
- Domain: Eukaryota
- Kingdom: Animalia
- Phylum: Arthropoda
- Class: Insecta
- Order: Coleoptera
- Suborder: Polyphaga
- Infraorder: Scarabaeiformia
- Family: Scarabaeidae
- Genus: Geopsammodius
- Species: G. subpedalis

Binomial name
- Geopsammodius subpedalis Skelley, 2006

Species of beetle

Geopsammodius subpedalis, the underfoot tiny sand-loving scarab, is a species of aphodiine dung beetle in the family Scarabaeidae. It is found in North America.
