= Neorhyssemus intrinsecus =

Scientific classification
- Kingdom: Animalia
- Phylum: Arthropoda
- Clade: Pancrustacea
- Class: Insecta
- Order: Coleoptera
- Suborder: Polyphaga
- Infraorder: Scarabaeiformia
- Family: Scarabaeidae
- Genus: Neorhyssemus
- Species: N. intrinsecus

Binomial name
- Neorhyssemus intrinsecus (Gordon & Cartwright, 1980)

Synonyms
- Rhyssemus intrinsecus Gordon & Cartwright, 1980

Species of beetle

Neorhyssemus intrinsecus is a species of beetle of the family Scarabaeidae. It is found in Brazil (Mato Grosso).

== Description ==
Adults reach a length of about 1.7–2 mm (0.067–0.079 in). The body is somewhat short. The head is tuberculate, with the tubercles sharp and the clypeus is emarginate. The frontoclypeal suture is grooved. The pronotum has four transversal ridges, interrupted medially, with only the first ridge complete. The elytral margin is rounded.
