= Rhyssemus sonatus =

Scientific classification
- Kingdom: Animalia
- Phylum: Arthropoda
- Clade: Pancrustacea
- Class: Insecta
- Order: Coleoptera
- Suborder: Polyphaga
- Infraorder: Scarabaeiformia
- Family: Scarabaeidae
- Genus: Rhyssemus
- Species: R. sonatus

Binomial name
- Rhyssemus sonatus LeConte, 1881

Species of beetle

Rhyssemus sonatus is a species of aphodiine dung beetle in the family Scarabaeidae. It is found in Canada (Alberta, Manitoba, Saskatchewan) and the United States (Arkansas, Colorado, Illinois, Iowa, Kansas, Nebraska, North Dakota).
