= Rhyssemus grossepunctatus =

Scientific classification
- Kingdom: Animalia
- Phylum: Arthropoda
- Clade: Pancrustacea
- Class: Insecta
- Order: Coleoptera
- Suborder: Polyphaga
- Infraorder: Scarabaeiformia
- Family: Scarabaeidae
- Genus: Rhyssemus
- Species: R. grossepunctatus

Binomial name
- Rhyssemus grossepunctatus Balthasar, 1961

Species of beetle

Rhyssemus grossepunctatus is a species of beetle of the family Scarabaeidae. It is found in Algeria.

== Description ==
Adults reach a length of about 4.3 mm (0.17 in). They have a rather robust, strongly convex, not very shiny, black body, with the frontal margin of the clypeus and the legs dark reddish-brown.
