= Neotrichiorhyssemus expansicollis =

Scientific classification
- Kingdom: Animalia
- Phylum: Arthropoda
- Clade: Pancrustacea
- Class: Insecta
- Order: Coleoptera
- Suborder: Polyphaga
- Infraorder: Scarabaeiformia
- Family: Scarabaeidae
- Genus: Neotrichiorhyssemus
- Species: N. expansicollis

Binomial name
- Neotrichiorhyssemus expansicollis (Bénard, 1930)

Synonyms
- Trichiorhyssemus expansicollis Bénard, 1930

Species of beetle

Neotrichiorhyssemus expansicollis is a species of beetle of the family Scarabaeidae. It is found in India (Goa, Tamil Nadu), Indonesia (Sumatra), Malaysia, Singapore, Sri Lanka and Thailand.

== Description ==
Adults reach a length of about 4 mm (0.16 in). They have a quite strongly convex, moderately shiny, black body, with the legs blackish-brown.
