= Leiopsammodius ocmulgeei =

Scientific classification
- Kingdom: Animalia
- Phylum: Arthropoda
- Clade: Pancrustacea
- Class: Insecta
- Order: Coleoptera
- Suborder: Polyphaga
- Infraorder: Scarabaeiformia
- Family: Scarabaeidae
- Genus: Leiopsammodius
- Species: L. ocmulgeei

Binomial name
- Leiopsammodius ocmulgeei Harpootlian, Gordon & Woodruff, 2000

Species of beetle

Leiopsammodius ocmulgeei is a species of aphodiine dung beetle in the family Scarabaeidae. It is found in the United States (Georgia).

== Description ==
Adults reach a length of about 2.7–3.2 mm (0.11–0.13 in). They have an oblong-oval, subparallel, moderately shining, dark rufo-castaneous body. The antennae are rufo-testaceous.

== Etymology ==
The species is named for the Ocmulgee River, where it is found.
