= Leiopsammodius rufus =

Scientific classification
- Kingdom: Animalia
- Phylum: Arthropoda
- Clade: Pancrustacea
- Class: Insecta
- Order: Coleoptera
- Suborder: Polyphaga
- Infraorder: Scarabaeiformia
- Family: Scarabaeidae
- Genus: Leiopsammodius
- Species: L. rufus

Binomial name
- Leiopsammodius rufus (Rakovič, 1981)

Synonyms
- Psamodius (Leiopsammodius) rufus Rakovič, 1981

Species of beetle

Leiopsammodius rufus is a species of beetle of the family Scarabaeidae. It is found in Australia (New South Wales, South Australia, Western Australia, Victoria).
