= Neotrichiorhyssemus hauseri =

Scientific classification
- Kingdom: Animalia
- Phylum: Arthropoda
- Clade: Pancrustacea
- Class: Insecta
- Order: Coleoptera
- Suborder: Polyphaga
- Infraorder: Scarabaeiformia
- Family: Scarabaeidae
- Genus: Neotrichiorhyssemus
- Species: N. hauseri

Binomial name
- Neotrichiorhyssemus hauseri (Balthasar, 1933)

Synonyms
- Trichiorhyssemus hauseri Balthasar, 1933

Species of beetle

Neotrichiorhyssemus hauseri is a species of beetle of the family Scarabaeidae. It is found in Indonesia (Kalimantan) and Taiwan (Lanyu Island).

== Description ==
Adults reach a length of about 3.5 mm (0.14 in). They have a nearly parallel-sided, black body, with the legs lighter brown. The elytra have a single row of fine, yellow setae.
