= Rhyssemus convexus =

Scientific classification
- Kingdom: Animalia
- Phylum: Arthropoda
- Clade: Pancrustacea
- Class: Insecta
- Order: Coleoptera
- Suborder: Polyphaga
- Infraorder: Scarabaeiformia
- Family: Scarabaeidae
- Genus: Rhyssemus
- Species: R. convexus

Binomial name
- Rhyssemus convexus Bénard, 1911

Synonyms
- Rhyssemus seminulum Balthasar, 1945

Species of beetle

Rhyssemus convexus is a species of beetle of the family Scarabaeidae. It is found in Morocco and Spain.

== Description ==
Adults reach a length of about 2.5–3 mm (0.098–0.118 in). They have a short, strongly convex, stout, shiny, black body, with the margins of the clypeus and the anterior margin of the pronotum yellowish-red and the legs reddish-brown.
