= Rhyssemus osmanlis =

Scientific classification
- Kingdom: Animalia
- Phylum: Arthropoda
- Clade: Pancrustacea
- Class: Insecta
- Order: Coleoptera
- Suborder: Polyphaga
- Infraorder: Scarabaeiformia
- Family: Scarabaeidae
- Genus: Rhyssemus
- Species: R. osmanlis

Binomial name
- Rhyssemus osmanlis Koshantschikov, 1916

Species of beetle

Rhyssemus osmanlis is a species of beetle of the family Scarabaeidae. It is found in Turkey.

== Description ==
Adults reach a length of about 4 mm (0.16 in). They have a rather weakly convex, slightly shining, black body, with reddish-brown legs.
