= Neotrichiorhyssemus =

Scientific classification
- Kingdom: Animalia
- Phylum: Arthropoda
- Clade: Pancrustacea
- Class: Insecta
- Order: Coleoptera
- Suborder: Polyphaga
- Infraorder: Scarabaeiformia
- Family: Scarabaeidae
- Subfamily: Aphodiinae
- Tribe: Psammodiini
- Genus: Neotrichiorhyssemus; Rakovič & Král, 1997

Genus of beetles

Neotrichiorhyssemus is a genus of beetles of the family Scarabaeidae.

== Species ==
- Neotrichiorhyssemus babaulti (Bénard, 1917)
- Neotrichiorhyssemus balthasari (Rakovič, 1987)
- Neotrichiorhyssemus boninensis (Nomura, 1960)
- Neotrichiorhyssemus esakii (Nomura, 1943)
- Neotrichiorhyssemus expansicollis (Bénard, 1930)
- Neotrichiorhyssemus ghati Rakovič, Mencl & Král, 2023
- Neotrichiorhyssemus hauseri (Balthasar, 1933)
- Neotrichiorhyssemus hegeri (Petrovitz, 1968)
- Neotrichiorhyssemus hirsutus (Clouët, 1901)
- Neotrichiorhyssemus kentingensis Masumoto, Ochi & Lan, 2013
- Neotrichiorhyssemus klapaleki (Balthasar, 1963)
- Neotrichiorhyssemus malabaricus (Balthasar, 1963)
- Neotrichiorhyssemus malkini (Rakovič, 1987)
- Neotrichiorhyssemus matthewsi (Rakovič, 1983)
- Neotrichiorhyssemus setiventris (Petrovitz, 1968)
- Neotrichiorhyssemus umbilicatus (Petrovitz, 1968)
