= Granulopsammodius =

Scientific classification
- Kingdom: Animalia
- Phylum: Arthropoda
- Clade: Pancrustacea
- Class: Insecta
- Order: Coleoptera
- Suborder: Polyphaga
- Infraorder: Scarabaeiformia
- Family: Scarabaeidae
- Subfamily: Aphodiinae
- Tribe: Psammodiini
- Genus: Granulopsammodius; Rakovič, 1981

Genus of beetles

Granulopsammodius is a genus of beetles of the family Scarabaeidae.

== Species ==
- Granulopsammodius centralasiae (Rakovič, 1978)
- Granulopsammodius loebli (Pittino, 1980)
- Granulopsammodius mesopotamicus (Petrovitz, 1971)
- Granulopsammodius mongol (Endrödi, 1969)
- Granulopsammodius persicus Rakovič, 1998
- Granulopsammodius petrovitzi (Rakovič, 1978)
- Granulopsammodius plicatuloides (Pittino, 1984)
- Granulopsammodius plicatulus (Fairmaire, 1892)
- Granulopsammodius sinicus Rakovič, 1986
- Granulopsammodius tienshanicus (Pittino, 1984)
- Granulopsammodius transcaspicus (Petrovitz, 1961)
