= Rhyssemus algiricus =

Scientific classification
- Kingdom: Animalia
- Phylum: Arthropoda
- Clade: Pancrustacea
- Class: Insecta
- Order: Coleoptera
- Suborder: Polyphaga
- Infraorder: Scarabaeiformia
- Family: Scarabaeidae
- Genus: Rhyssemus
- Species: R. algiricus

Binomial name
- Rhyssemus algiricus Lucas, 1846

Species of beetle

Rhyssemus algiricus is a species of beetle of the family Scarabaeidae. It is found in Algeria, Italy, Morocco, Spain and Tunisia.

== Description ==
Adults reach a length of about 3.8–4.7 mm (0.15–0.19 in). They have a robust, strongly convex, black body. The anterior part of the body is slightly glossy, while the elytra are dull with glossy stripes. The anterior margin of the head and the front tibiae are brownish-red.
