= Rakovicius coreanus =

Scientific classification
- Kingdom: Animalia
- Phylum: Arthropoda
- Clade: Pancrustacea
- Class: Insecta
- Order: Coleoptera
- Suborder: Polyphaga
- Infraorder: Scarabaeiformia
- Family: Scarabaeidae
- Genus: Rakovicius
- Species: R. coreanus

Binomial name
- Rakovicius coreanus (Kim, 1980)

Synonyms
- Psammodius coreanus Kim, 1980

Species of beetle

Rakovicius coreanus is a species of beetle of the family Scarabaeidae. It is found in Japan and Korea.

== Description ==
Adults reach a length of about 2.7–3.1 mm (0.11–0.12 in). They have a somewhat slender, elongate-oval, weakly shiny, reddish-brown to blackish-brown body, with the clypeus, elytra and legs red and the antennae yellow.

== Life history ==
The habitat consists of sandy soil near bodies of water.
