= Rhyssemodes alutaceus =

Scientific classification
- Kingdom: Animalia
- Phylum: Arthropoda
- Clade: Pancrustacea
- Class: Insecta
- Order: Coleoptera
- Suborder: Polyphaga
- Infraorder: Scarabaeiformia
- Family: Scarabaeidae
- Genus: Rhyssemodes
- Species: R. alutaceus

Binomial name
- Rhyssemodes alutaceus Reitter, 1892

Species of beetle

Rhyssemodes alutaceus is a species of beetle of the family Scarabaeidae. It is found in Kazakhstan, Kyrgyzstan, Turkmenistan and Uzbekistan.

== Description ==
Adults reach a length of about 3.5–4 mm (0.14–0.16 in). They have an elongate, slightly convex, dull, black to blackish-brown body, with the anterior margin of the head and the legs reddish-brown.
