= Leiopsammodius gestroi =

Scientific classification
- Kingdom: Animalia
- Phylum: Arthropoda
- Clade: Pancrustacea
- Class: Insecta
- Order: Coleoptera
- Suborder: Polyphaga
- Infraorder: Scarabaeiformia
- Family: Scarabaeidae
- Genus: Leiopsammodius
- Species: L. gestroi

Binomial name
- Leiopsammodius gestroi (Clouët, 1900)

Synonyms
- Psammobius gestroi Clouët, 1900

Species of beetle

Leiopsammodius gestroi is a species of beetle of the family Scarabaeidae. It is found in Afghanistan, India (Arunachal Pradesh, Uttarakhand), Korea, Nepal, Pakistan, Cambodia and Myanmar.

== Description ==
Adults reach a length of about 2.2–3.2 mm (0.087–0.126 in). They have a strongly convex, shiny, mostly yellowish-brown body, although the forebody is somewhat reddish-brown.
