= Afrodiastictus =

Scientific classification
- Kingdom: Animalia
- Phylum: Arthropoda
- Clade: Pancrustacea
- Class: Insecta
- Order: Coleoptera
- Suborder: Polyphaga
- Infraorder: Scarabaeiformia
- Family: Scarabaeidae
- Subfamily: Aphodiinae
- Tribe: Psammodiini
- Genus: Afrodiastictus; Pittino & Mariani, 1986

Genus of beetles

Afrodiastictus is a genus of beetles of the family Scarabaeidae.

== Species ==
- Afrodiastictus apterus Pittino & Mariani, 1986
- Afrodiastictus carinatus (Paulian, 1954)
- Afrodiastictus ceratus (Clément, 1969)
- Afrodiastictus endroedyyoungai (Endrödi, 1973)
- Afrodiastictus insularis (Petrovitz, 1969)
- Afrodiastictus mimicus (Gordon & Cartwright, 1980)
- Afrodiastictus minutus (Petrovitz, 1970)
