= Rakovicius ainu =

Scientific classification
- Kingdom: Animalia
- Phylum: Arthropoda
- Clade: Pancrustacea
- Class: Insecta
- Order: Coleoptera
- Suborder: Polyphaga
- Infraorder: Scarabaeiformia
- Family: Scarabaeidae
- Genus: Rakovicius
- Species: R. ainu

Binomial name
- Rakovicius ainu (Lewis, 1895)

Synonyms
- Psammodius ainu Lewis, 1895

Species of beetle

Rakovicius ainu is a species of beetle of the family Scarabaeidae. It is found in Japan and the Russian Far East.

== Description ==
Adults reach a length of about 2.75 mm (0.108 in). They have a hardly glossy, black body, with the front of the head translucently reddish.
