= Rhyssemus vaulogeri =

Scientific classification
- Kingdom: Animalia
- Phylum: Arthropoda
- Clade: Pancrustacea
- Class: Insecta
- Order: Coleoptera
- Suborder: Polyphaga
- Infraorder: Scarabaeiformia
- Family: Scarabaeidae
- Genus: Rhyssemus
- Species: R. vaulogeri

Binomial name
- Rhyssemus vaulogeri Clouët, 1901

Species of beetle

Rhyssemus vaulogeri is a species of beetle of the family Scarabaeidae. It is found in Algeria and Tunisia.

== Description ==
Adults reach a length of about 2.5–4 mm (0.098–0.157 in). They have an elongate, moderately shiny, light or dark reddish-brown body.
