= Odontopsammodius insulcatus =

Scientific classification
- Kingdom: Animalia
- Phylum: Arthropoda
- Clade: Pancrustacea
- Class: Insecta
- Order: Coleoptera
- Suborder: Polyphaga
- Infraorder: Scarabaeiformia
- Family: Scarabaeidae
- Genus: Odontopsammodius
- Species: O. insulcatus

Binomial name
- Odontopsammodius insulcatus (Schmidt, 1917)

Synonyms
- Psammobius insulcatus Schmidt, 1917

Species of beetle

Odontopsammodius insulcatus is a species of beetle of the family Scarabaeidae. It is found in Brazil (Santa Catarina).

== Description ==
Adults reach a length of about 3.75 mm (0.148 in). The body is piceous and the head is granulate with a smooth frons. The pronotum is quite densely punctured, with the punctures smaller near the anterior margin and sides. The sides are crenate and fringed with setae. The elytra have smooth and flat interstriae and the striae are fine.
