= Leiopsammodius freyi =

Scientific classification
- Kingdom: Animalia
- Phylum: Arthropoda
- Clade: Pancrustacea
- Class: Insecta
- Order: Coleoptera
- Suborder: Polyphaga
- Infraorder: Scarabaeiformia
- Family: Scarabaeidae
- Genus: Leiopsammodius
- Species: L. freyi

Binomial name
- Leiopsammodius freyi (Petrovitz, 1961)

Synonyms
- Psammobius freyi Petrovitz, 1961

Species of beetle

Leiopsammodius freyi is a species of beetle of the family Scarabaeidae. It is found in Australia (Northern Territory).
