= Pseudomyrhessus =

Scientific classification
- Kingdom: Animalia
- Phylum: Arthropoda
- Clade: Pancrustacea
- Class: Insecta
- Order: Coleoptera
- Suborder: Polyphaga
- Infraorder: Scarabaeiformia
- Family: Scarabaeidae
- Subfamily: Aphodiinae
- Tribe: Psammodiini
- Genus: Pseudomyrhessus; Minkina, 2024
- Species: P. afghanus

Binomial name
- Pseudomyrhessus afghanus (Balthasar, 1939)

Synonyms
- Rhyssemus afghanus Balthasar, 1939

Genus of beetles

Pseudomyrhessus is a genus of beetle of the family Scarabaeidae. It is monotypic, being represented by the single species, Pseudomyrhessus afghanus, which is found in Afghanistan and Tajikistan.

== Description ==
Adults reach a length of about 3–3.2 mm (0.12–0.13 in). They have a strongly convex, moderately glossy, black to blackish-brown body. The legs are brown.
