= Trichiorhyssemus lasionotus =

Scientific classification
- Kingdom: Animalia
- Phylum: Arthropoda
- Clade: Pancrustacea
- Class: Insecta
- Order: Coleoptera
- Suborder: Polyphaga
- Infraorder: Scarabaeiformia
- Family: Scarabaeidae
- Genus: Trichiorhyssemus
- Species: T. lasionotus

Binomial name
- Trichiorhyssemus lasionotus Clouët, 1901

Species of beetle

Trichiorhyssemus lasionotus is a species of beetle of the family Scarabaeidae. It is found in China (Tianjin) and Taiwan.

== Description ==
Adults reach a length of about 2.7–3 mm (0.11–0.12 in). They have a short, strongly convex, blackish-brown body, with the anterior margin of the head, the anterior angles of the pronotum and the elytra reddish-brown. There are some short setae on the pronotum, as well as some toward the rear of the elytra.
