= Neotrichiorhyssemus boninensis =

Scientific classification
- Kingdom: Animalia
- Phylum: Arthropoda
- Clade: Pancrustacea
- Class: Insecta
- Order: Coleoptera
- Suborder: Polyphaga
- Infraorder: Scarabaeiformia
- Family: Scarabaeidae
- Genus: Neotrichiorhyssemus
- Species: N. boninensis

Binomial name
- Neotrichiorhyssemus boninensis (Nomura, 1960)

Synonyms
- Trichiorhyssemus boninensis Nomura, 1960

Species of beetle

Neotrichiorhyssemus boninensis is a species of beetle of the family Scarabaeidae. It is found in Japan (Bonin Islands) and Palau.

== Description ==
Adults reach a length of about 3.5 mm (0.14 in).
