= Rhyssemus bedeli =

Scientific classification
- Kingdom: Animalia
- Phylum: Arthropoda
- Clade: Pancrustacea
- Class: Insecta
- Order: Coleoptera
- Suborder: Polyphaga
- Infraorder: Scarabaeiformia
- Family: Scarabaeidae
- Genus: Rhyssemus
- Species: R. bedeli

Binomial name
- Rhyssemus bedeli Clouët, 1901

Species of beetle

Rhyssemus bedeli is a species of beetle of the family Scarabaeidae. It is found in Algeria, Tunisia and Mauritania.

== Description ==
Adults reach a length of about 3.5–3.8 mm (0.14–0.15 in). They have a robust, reddish-brown body, with the forebody sometimes dark brown.
