= Neotrichiorhyssemus babaulti =

Scientific classification
- Kingdom: Animalia
- Phylum: Arthropoda
- Clade: Pancrustacea
- Class: Insecta
- Order: Coleoptera
- Suborder: Polyphaga
- Infraorder: Scarabaeiformia
- Family: Scarabaeidae
- Genus: Neotrichiorhyssemus
- Species: N. babaulti

Binomial name
- Neotrichiorhyssemus babaulti (Bénard, 1917)

Synonyms
- Trichiorhyssemus babaulti Bénard, 1917

Species of beetle

Neotrichiorhyssemus babaulti is a species of beetle of the family Scarabaeidae. It is found in India (Odisha).

== Description ==
Adults reach a length of about 3.5 mm (0.14 in). They have an elongate, quite strongly convex, shining, black body, with the clypeus yellowish-red anteriorly and with the legs brownish-red.
