= Myrhessus =

Scientific classification
- Kingdom: Animalia
- Phylum: Arthropoda
- Clade: Pancrustacea
- Class: Insecta
- Order: Coleoptera
- Suborder: Polyphaga
- Infraorder: Scarabaeiformia
- Family: Scarabaeidae
- Subfamily: Aphodiinae
- Tribe: Psammodiini
- Genus: Myrhessus; Balthasar, 1955
- Species: M. mirabilis

Binomial name
- Myrhessus mirabilis Balthasar, 1955

Genus of beetles

Myrhessus is a genus of beetle of the family Scarabaeidae. It is monotypic, being represented by the single species, Myrhessus mirabilis, which is found in Afghanistan and Tajikistan.

== Description ==
Adults reach a length of about 3.8 mm (0.15 in). They have a robust, strongly convex, black body, with the underside brownish-black and the anterior margin of the clypeus reddish and translucent. The legs are dark reddish-brown.
