= Sicardia boiteli =

Scientific classification
- Kingdom: Animalia
- Phylum: Arthropoda
- Clade: Pancrustacea
- Class: Insecta
- Order: Coleoptera
- Suborder: Polyphaga
- Infraorder: Scarabaeiformia
- Family: Scarabaeidae
- Genus: Sicardia
- Species: S. boiteli

Binomial name
- Sicardia boiteli (Normand, 1938)

Synonyms
- Bipammosus boiteli Normand, 1938; Psammobius (Sicardia) pierrei Hollande & Thérond, 1998

Species of beetle

Sicardia boiteli is a species of beetle of the family Scarabaeidae. It is found in Algeria.

== Description ==
Adults reach a length of about 6 mm (0.24 in). They have a strongly convex, glossy, rust-red body, with the legs light yellow-red.
