= Leiopsammodius laevicollis =

Scientific classification
- Kingdom: Animalia
- Phylum: Arthropoda
- Clade: Pancrustacea
- Class: Insecta
- Order: Coleoptera
- Suborder: Polyphaga
- Infraorder: Scarabaeiformia
- Family: Scarabaeidae
- Genus: Leiopsammodius
- Species: L. laevicollis

Binomial name
- Leiopsammodius laevicollis (Klug, 1830)

Synonyms
- Psammodius laevicollis Klug, 1830; Psammobius chobauti Orbigny, 1898; Psammodius pallidus Reitter, 1892

Species of beetle

Leiopsammodius laevicollis is a species of beetle of the family Scarabaeidae. It is found in Algeria, Egypt, Israel, Libya, Morocco, Oman, Palestine, Syria, Tunisia, Saudi Arabia, Yemen, Chad, Ethiopia, the Democratic Republic of the Congo, Somalia and Sudan.

== Description ==
Adults reach a length of about 2.8–3.8 mm (0.11–0.15 in). They have a glossy, strongly convex, yellowish-brown body.
