= Aphodopsammobius demarzi =

Scientific classification
- Kingdom: Animalia
- Phylum: Arthropoda
- Clade: Pancrustacea
- Class: Insecta
- Order: Coleoptera
- Suborder: Polyphaga
- Infraorder: Scarabaeiformia
- Family: Scarabaeidae
- Genus: Aphodopsammobius
- Species: A. demarzi

Binomial name
- Aphodopsammobius demarzi (Petrovitz, 1964)

Synonyms
- Psammodius demarzi Petrovitz, 1964

Species of beetle

Aphodopsammobius demarzi is a species of beetle of the family Scarabaeidae. It is found in Australia (Northern Territory, Western Australia).
