= Aphodopsammobius rugicollis =

Scientific classification
- Kingdom: Animalia
- Phylum: Arthropoda
- Clade: Pancrustacea
- Class: Insecta
- Order: Coleoptera
- Suborder: Polyphaga
- Infraorder: Scarabaeiformia
- Family: Scarabaeidae
- Genus: Aphodopsammobius
- Species: A. rugicollis

Binomial name
- Aphodopsammobius rugicollis (MacLeay, 1888)

Synonyms
- Ammoecius rugicollis MacLeay, 1888; Aphodopsammobius matthewsi Rakovič, 1981

Species of beetle

Aphodopsammobius rugicollis is a species of beetle of the family Scarabaeidae. It is found in Australia (Northern Territory, Queensland, Western Australia).
