= Phycochus =

Scientific classification
- Kingdom: Animalia
- Phylum: Arthropoda
- Clade: Pancrustacea
- Class: Insecta
- Order: Coleoptera
- Suborder: Polyphaga
- Infraorder: Scarabaeiformia
- Family: Scarabaeidae
- Subfamily: Aphodiinae
- Tribe: Psammodiini
- Subtribe: Phycocina; Landin, 1960
- Genus: Phycochus; Broun, 1886
- Species: P. graniceps

Binomial name
- Phycochus graniceps Broun, 1886

Synonyms
- Phycochini Rakovič & Král, 1997; Phycochus lobatus Broun, 1893; Phycocus Broun, 1883; Phycocus graniceps Broun, 1883

Genus of beetles

Phycochus is a genus of scarab beetles in the family Scarabaeidae and only genus within the subtribe Phycocina. It only contains the species, Phycochus graniceps, which is found in Australia (Tasmania) and New Zealand.

== Description ==
Adults reach a length of about 2.5–3 mm (0.098–0.118 in). They have a shiny black, brownish black or brown body, with the legs and ventral surface lighter in most specimens. Adults are blind and flightless.

== Life history ==
They are found in coastal sand dunes along beaches, where they may be found beneath debris and under logs.
