= Parapsammodius bidens =

Scientific classification
- Domain: Eukaryota
- Kingdom: Animalia
- Phylum: Arthropoda
- Class: Insecta
- Order: Coleoptera
- Suborder: Polyphaga
- Infraorder: Scarabaeiformia
- Family: Scarabaeidae
- Genus: Parapsammodius
- Species: P. bidens

Binomial name
- Parapsammodius bidens (Horn, 1871)

Species of beetle

Parapsammodius bidens is a species of aphodiine dung beetle in the family Scarabaeidae. It is found in the Caribbean Sea and North America.
