= Neotrichiorhyssemus esakii =

Scientific classification
- Kingdom: Animalia
- Phylum: Arthropoda
- Clade: Pancrustacea
- Class: Insecta
- Order: Coleoptera
- Suborder: Polyphaga
- Infraorder: Scarabaeiformia
- Family: Scarabaeidae
- Genus: Neotrichiorhyssemus
- Species: N. esakii

Binomial name
- Neotrichiorhyssemus esakii (Nomura, 1943)

Synonyms
- Trichiorhyssemus esakii Nomura, 1943

Species of beetle

Neotrichiorhyssemus esakii is a species of beetle of the family Scarabaeidae. It is found in Japan, Indonesia (Irian Jaya), Papua New Guinea, the Marshall Islands and Kiribati.
