= Diastictus =

Scientific classification
- Kingdom: Animalia
- Phylum: Arthropoda
- Clade: Pancrustacea
- Class: Insecta
- Order: Coleoptera
- Suborder: Polyphaga
- Infraorder: Scarabaeiformia
- Family: Scarabaeidae
- Subfamily: Aphodiinae
- Tribe: Psammodiini
- Genus: Diastictus; Mulsant, 1842
- Species: D. vulneratus

Binomial name
- Diastictus vulneratus (Sturm, 1805)

Synonyms
- Aphodius vulneratus Sturm, 1805; Diastictus sabuleti latitans Mulsant, 1842; Aphodius semipunctatus Bonelli, 1812

Genus of beetles

Diastictus is a genus of beetle of the family Scarabaeidae. It is monotypic, being represented by the single species, Diastictus vulneratus, which is found in Austria, Belarus, Belgium, Bosnia Herzegovina, Bulgaria, China (Xinjiang), Croatia, the Czech Republic, Denmark, Estonia, France, Germany, Great Britain, Greece, Hungary, Italy, Latvia, Lithuania, the Netherlands, Poland, Romania, Russia, (including Siberia), Serbia, Slovakia, Sweden, Switzerland and Ukraine.

== Description ==
Adults reach a length of about 3–3.3 mm (0.12–0.13 in). They have a moderately glossy, blackish-brown to black body, with the frontal margin of the head, the anterior angles of the pronotum and the legs lighter reddish-brown.
