= Rhyssemus berytensis =

Scientific classification
- Kingdom: Animalia
- Phylum: Arthropoda
- Clade: Pancrustacea
- Class: Insecta
- Order: Coleoptera
- Suborder: Polyphaga
- Infraorder: Scarabaeiformia
- Family: Scarabaeidae
- Genus: Rhyssemus
- Species: R. berytensis

Binomial name
- Rhyssemus berytensis Marseul, 1878

Synonyms
- Rhyssemus mediterranicus Petrovitz, 1971

Species of beetle

Rhyssemus berytensis is a species of beetle of the family Scarabaeidae. It is found in Bulgaria, Cyprus, Greece (Crete), Iran, Iraq, Israel, Lebanon, Montenegro, Syria and Turkey.

== Description ==
Adults reach a length of about 3.5–4 mm (0.14–0.16 in). They have a strongly convex, black body, with the margin of the pronotum and the legs light reddish-brown.
