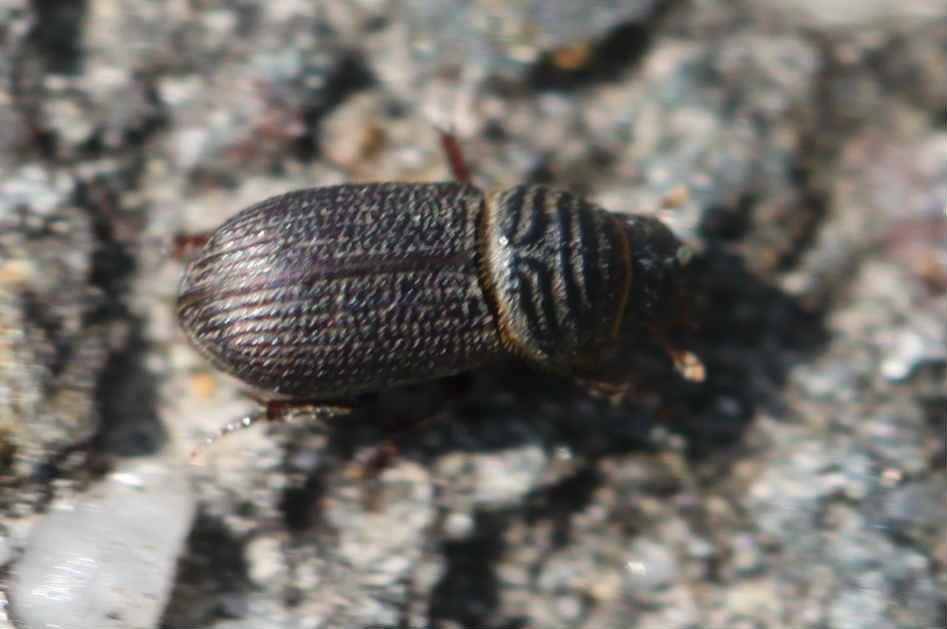
- Rhyssemus germanus

Scientific classification
- Kingdom: Animalia
- Phylum: Arthropoda
- Clade: Pancrustacea
- Class: Insecta
- Order: Coleoptera
- Suborder: Polyphaga
- Infraorder: Scarabaeiformia
- Family: Scarabaeidae
- Subfamily: Aphodiinae
- Tribe: Psammodiini
- Genus: Rhyssemus; Mulsant, 1842

Diversity
- at least 160 species

Synonyms
- Boucardius Petrovitz, 1967

= Rhyssemus =

Genus of beetles

Rhyssemus is a genus of aphodiine dung beetles in the family Scarabaeidae. There are more than 160 described species in Rhyssemus.

== See also ==
- List of Rhyssemus species
