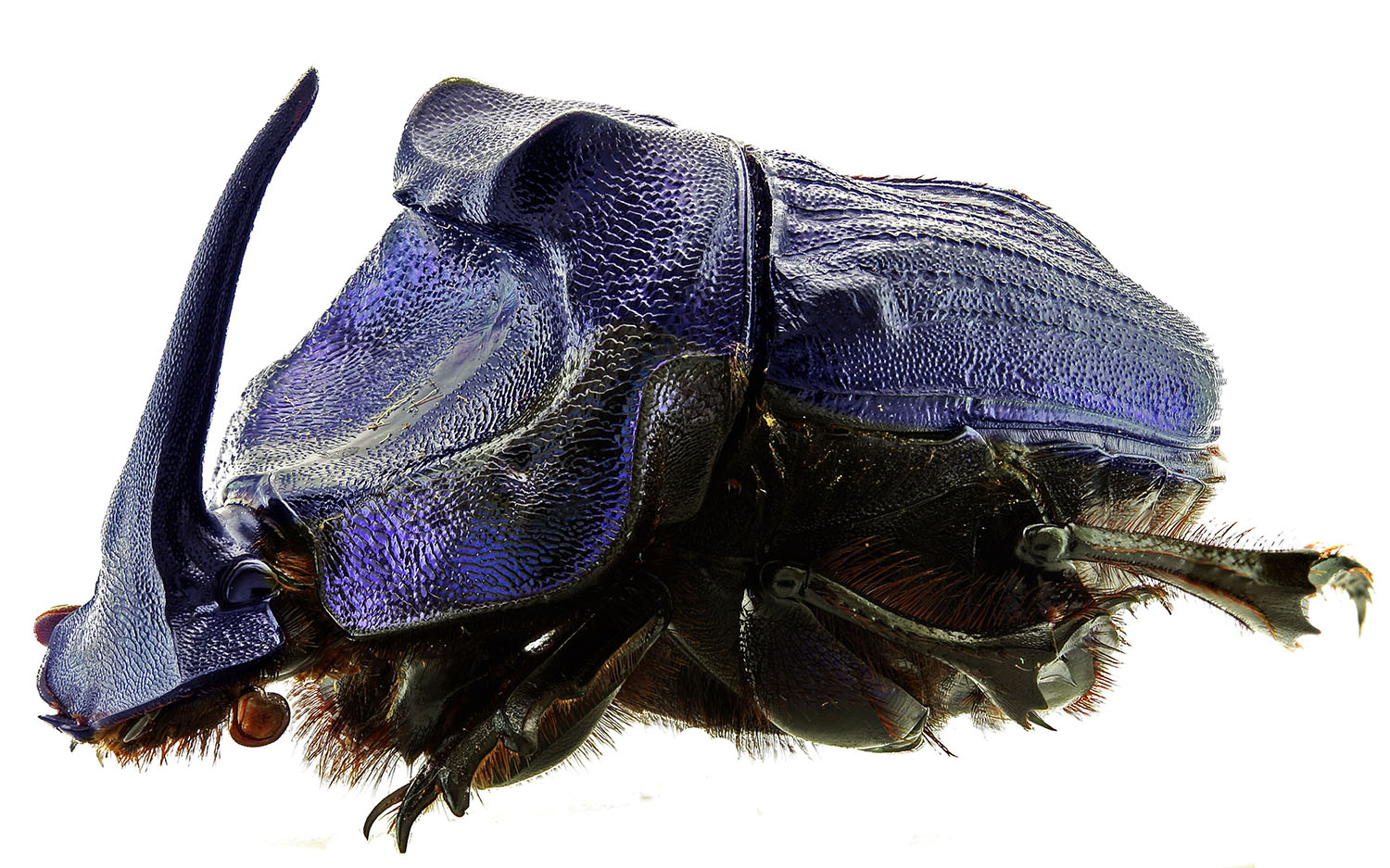

Scientific classification
- Kingdom: Animalia
- Phylum: Arthropoda
- Clade: Pancrustacea
- Class: Insecta
- Order: Coleoptera
- Suborder: Polyphaga
- Infraorder: Scarabaeiformia
- Family: Scarabaeidae
- Subfamily: Scarabaeinae
- Tribe: Phanaeini
- Genus: Coprophanaeus
- Species: C. lancifer

Binomial name
- Coprophanaeus lancifer (Linnaeus, 1767)

= Coprophanaeus lancifer =

Species of beetle

Coprophanaeus lancifer is a large species of beetle belonging to the family Scarabaeidae (scarab beetles).

== Description ==
Adults typically are 28–56 mm (1.1–2.2 in) long, with an average length of 44 mm (1.7 in). They can weigh up to 10 g, which is heavier than a hummingbird. This makes C. lancifer and the closely related C. ensifer some of the largest dung beetles in the world (together with certain Catharsius and Heliocopris) and the largest in the Americas. This beetle has a horn on the head that is always greater in size in males than females. However, this difference in size is insignificant in small individuals. Because the sexually dimorphic horn is only obviously present in large males and only obviously absent in large females, C. lancifer is characterized by its reduced sexual dimorphism compared with other species of the genus.

== Distribution ==
It is found widely in the Amazon rainforest in South America and can be found throughout Venezuela, French Guina, Guyana, Suriname, Brazil, Bolivia, and Peru. They are floor dwelling beetles that are mostly found in terra firma habitats and less commonly found in floodplain forests.

Coprophanaeus lancifer beetles have been found in forests in northeastern Brazil according to a recent historical biogeographical study. This is the first record of the Coprophanaeus genus being found in large quantities in the South American continent. Such a finding is especially prevalent considering Coprophanaeus beetles have been under severe threat due to habitat fragmentation and agricultural urbanization/expansion in the greater Atlantic forest region.

== Behavior ==
=== Feeding ===
Although part of the true dung beetle subfamily Scarabaeinae, C. lancifer primarily is a necrophage that feeds on vertebrate carcasses, although it also may feed on feces or occasionally even ripe fallen fruits. There are also reports that this beetle feeds on decomposing millipedes. They are capable of flying up to 5 km per day to find and bury their food. These distances mean that C. lancifer are able to disperse seeds that are often found in dung.

They are paracoprids, meaning that adults dig tunnels into the soil under the carcass and move parts of this food source to a nest chamber where the eggs are laid. Once carcasses become bloated, the beetles are able to roll the carcass onto its back. Later in the decomposition process, they are able to dismember small hoof bones and move them as far as 30 cm from the carcass. These beetles are able to create deep lesions and other artifacts on a carcass that may cause confusion on the reason for the animal's death. Because of their feeding on carrion, they are of interest to forensic entomology. These crepuscular beetles are excellent diggers and good fliers. They appear to fly only at dusk.

Like other horned beetles, once C. lancifer finds a carcass, they build a burrow nearby and look for a sexual partner. These beetles are also capable of stagnating their active time above ground to avoid other beetles.

== Physiology ==
Using a physiological model of crepuscular horned beetle vision, researchers have found variation in visual signal coloration as a relatively accurate predictor of sensory drive hypotheses. When brightness was contrasted with mean coloration, brightness was most optimal in dusk ambient lighting as opposed to darker settings. From this, a conspicuousness could be calculated under different light environments. This allowed for an increasingly quantitative understanding of the adaptations in body coloration that dictate sensory-driven color signaling. The diversity in beetle coloration has become a revitalized focus of naturalists as they continue to study aspects of beetle physiology including vision, olfaction, aposematism, mimicry, and body temperature regulation.

An interesting feature of C. lancifer is that it is able to adjust its color based on environmental cues. C. lancifer is typically a blue-green color, particularly reflecting light at 495 nm and 505 nm. The pronotum, otherwise known as the dorsal part of the prothorax, is the brightest part of the body. The horn of the beetle is black. Unlike other beetles, it is predicted that structural coloration is found in C. lancifer. This is due to the rarity of the blue pigment and the relatively narrowbanded reflectance of its body surface.

C. lancifer beetles have adjusted visual systems that allow them to see optimally at short distances (half a meter) during dusk. At this time, the horn and pronotum of the beetle are more visible compared to other light environments and as a result, beetles use the color contrast of the horn in front of the pronotum to see other beetles. In addition, the contrast between the beetle and its environment is significantly higher during dusk than during the daytime. This dual adjustment allows beetles to identify each other the best during dusk time, which correlates with the hours that the beetle is most active.

At long distances, C. lancifer is more likely to use brightness contrast between a beetle and its environment to detect it. There are no differences in color contrast between sex during the daytime. Rapid detection by visual cues that are optimized to respond to dusk light is most likely critical for pair formation between two beetles.
