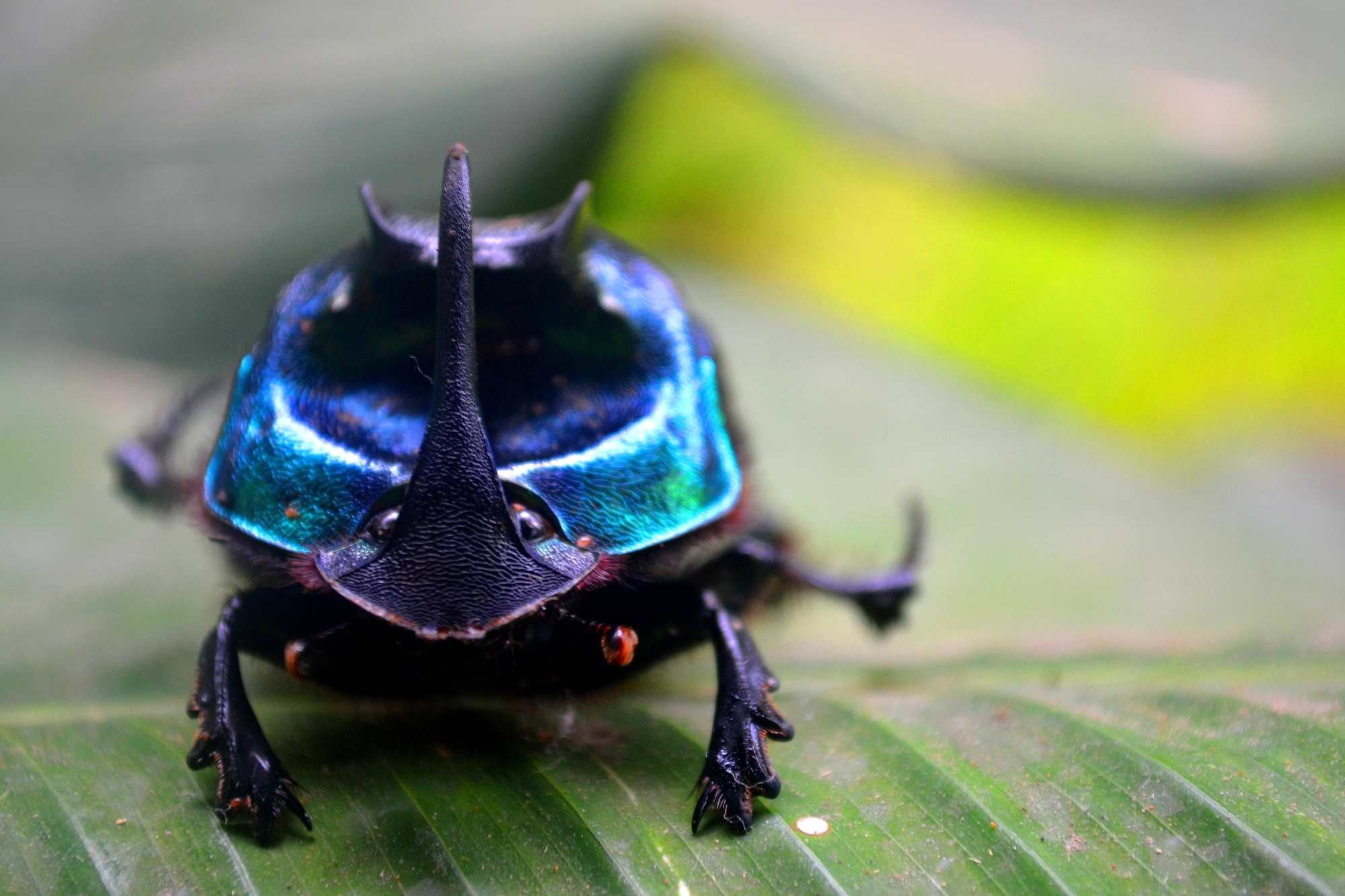
- Coprophanaeus ensifer in Pernambuco, Brazil

Scientific classification
- Kingdom: Animalia
- Phylum: Arthropoda
- Clade: Pancrustacea
- Class: Insecta
- Order: Coleoptera
- Suborder: Polyphaga
- Infraorder: Scarabaeiformia
- Family: Scarabaeidae
- Subfamily: Scarabaeinae
- Tribe: Phanaeini
- Genus: Coprophanaeus
- Species: C. ensifer

Binomial name
- Coprophanaeus ensifer (Germar, 1821)

Synonyms
- Copris ensifer Germar, 1821; Megaphanaeus ensifer Germar, 1821; Phanaeus ajax Sturm, 1826; Phanaeus ducalis Castelnau, 1840

= Coprophanaeus ensifer =

Species of beetle

Coprophanaeus ensifer is a large South American species of beetle belonging to the family Scarabaeidae. This species is necrophagous and builds burrows near or on animal carcasses to dismember the flesh of decaying bodies and bring it to its burrow to feed. Both females and males help build the burrow and feed. It is characterized by its iridescent colors and a horn that is similar in shape and size in females and males. It uses its horn to tear apart carcasses and to fight with other individuals, with male-male fighting occurring more often. However, females also fight to determine a variety of characteristics of the opposing male. This species may be of importance in forensic science due to its destructive behavior on decaying bodies, especially in areas of Brazil where homicide rates are high.

== Phylogeny ==
C. ensifer vary in color and distribution, which has created uncertainty and barriers in its taxonomy within the Coprophanaeus genus. Based on its mitogenome, the species was placed in the Phaneini tribe, which forms a clade of Scarabaeinae with other tribes like the Coprini tribe. Among species in this clade, most reside in South America except for Sarophorus sp., which is found in South Africa. Based on this, researchers have suggested Scarabaeinae beetles came to South America from Africa through colonization of the common ancestor of Sarophorus sp. and species in the clade with C. ensifer.

== Distribution and habitat ==
This species is found widely in eastern, central and southern Brazil, far northeastern Argentina, eastern Bolivia and Paraguay, occurring up to about 780 m (2,560 ft) above sea level. Most of its range is in the Caatinga, Cerrado and similar habitats, but in some regions its range also extends into the Atlantic forest and the Amazon rainforest.

A relates species, C. lancifer occupies northern Brazil, limiting the distribution of C. ensifer in those regions. C. lancifer was also thought to occupy the Juína region, but upon genetic investigation, it was found that individuals in that region are more closely related to C. ensifer, suggesting that the distribution of C. ensifer is wider than previously thought.

A study found that in Northeast Brazil, C. ensifer is more active during the rainy season, when temperatures drop. This preference can be explained by their large body. At high temperatures during dry seasons, it could be difficult to maintain a proper water balance because a large amount of water can be evaporated from their bodies. This could also explain why these beetles are crepuscular, or most active at dawn and dusk.

== Building burrows ==
In many cases, both females and males work together to build a burrow. Pairs that build burrows together are usually larger than other conspecifics. Females mainly built the burrow by pushing soil while males bring the soil up to the surface. The burrow is usually built near a carcass so that females and males can break it down to bring it inside the burrow by rolling the pieces of food. Cooperation between males and females suggests that parental care is offered by both sexes.

In other cases, females and males build burrows individually despite having mated with other individuals. Occasionally, small individuals build burrows next to burrows built by a pair.

Although the effects of bioturbation, or moving and mixing soil, caused by building burrows has not been empirically studied, it has been suggested that this could have an effect on the soil itself by increasing aeration and the ability for water to penetrate.

== Diet ==
Compared to other Scarabaeidae species who are coprophagous, this species is necrophagous, which means it feeds on carrion, or the decaying body of dead animals. It has even been reported to bury a dead snake to feed on it. A carcass goes through various stages of decomposition and C. ensifer is most attracted to the body when it is actively decomposing in the initial stages of decomposition.

By breaking down carrion and moving it or burying it, nutrient cycling may occur where nutrients that were part of the decaying carcass reenter the soil, affecting plant growth.

It has been suggested that the difference in diet in C. ensifer compared to other species in the Scarabaeidae family evolved in the Pleistocene because of the extinction of large mammals, so the beetles were forced to change their diet to decrease competition and ensure survival.

These beetles find decomposing carcasses through the detection of volatiles released during the decomposition process. A study found that females always arrived first to a pig carcass after the sun set, while males arrived later. Once the beetles arrive at the carcass, males bury themselves while females feed from it using their horn. The difference in arrival time suggest that females first find a suitable resource to feed and for oviposition while males arrive later to mate with females. Another potential explanation could be that males take advantage of females who have started building burrows, so that they can avoid digging tunnels.

== Fighting behavior ==
Both females and males engage in fighting activity using their horns. There can be male-male, female-female, or male-female fighting in these beetles. In burrows, individuals use their horn to carry and drop the other but on the surface of burrows, individuals fight by pushing each other. Males are more aggressive than females.

Female fighting against males may simply occur to refuse copulation after they have already copulated. However, another suggestion is that fighting can be used as a way to determine mates. If horns act as an ornament to attract females, fighting could be a way for females to gauge which males to mate with. If females can also decide which sperm to use to fertilize their eggs, engaging in fights after copulation could also serve to detect which sperm to use. When males fight, the larger male always wins, so this may also be a mechanism for mate choice. Lastly, males may also determine which female to mate with based on fighting. Larger females may be more beneficial to mate with because they can protect burrows, so fighting can be a way for males to determine female size.

== Genetics ==
The size of the mitogenome of C. ensifer is 14,964 bp organized into rRNA, tRNA, and protein coding genes, which is similar to species in the Coleptera order. C. ensifer, along most of Scarabaeinae species, are diploid (2n=20). This species specifically, has a XY sex-determining mechanism where the X and Y chromosomes do not exhibit any different configurations observed in other species.

== Copulation behavior ==
Four stages of copulation have been defined for Neotropical Scarabaeinae beetles. The first stage involves the male approaching the female, which is usually around a carcass or burrow. In the second stage, the male detects the female. The third stage involves the male mounting on the female. It has been observed that while the mounting occurs, the male strokes the abdominal tergum with his legs so that the female can reveal her genital opening. During the last stage, the males insert their aedeagus in the female genital opening.

While all males attempt to mate with females, larger males are more successful and among males, copulations are more successful when attempting with a smaller female. Copulation activity mainly takes place underground in burrows and tunnels and lasts around one to two minutes.

== Description ==
Adults typically are 30–56 mm (1.2–2.2 in) long, occasionally even reaching 65 mm (2.6 in). This makes C. ensifer and the closely related Amazonian C. lancifer some of the largest dung beetles in the world (together with certain Catharsius and Heliocopris) and the largest in the Americas. This beetle has a horn on the head that is of similar size in males and females. It is usually dark metallic green, often with some blue reflections, but it can occasionally be all metallic blue.

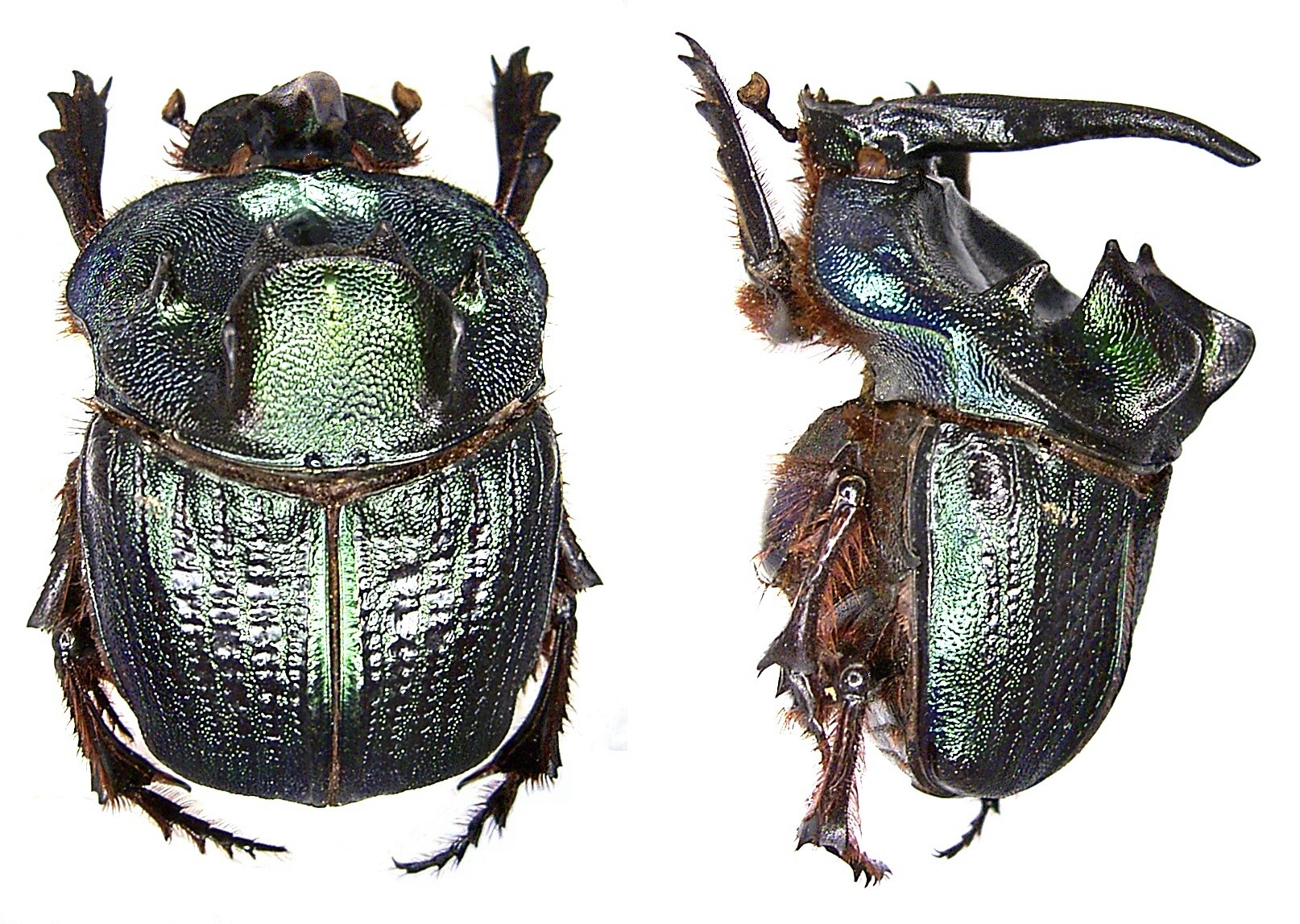
Male

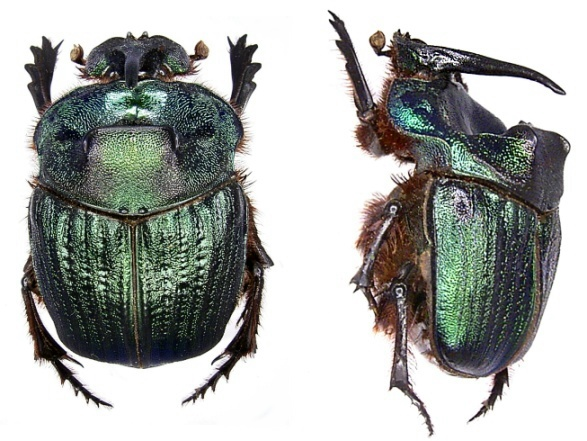
Female

=== Sexual dimorphism ===
Female and male C. ensifer do not exhibit pronounced sexual dimorphism. The main differences are that females do not have a spiniform process in the pronotal concavity compared to males, but they have a protarsi that males do not have.

=== Horn ===
C. ensifer has a long horn with a pair of processes projecting up and two other pairs of processes projecting forward. Although the body size of females and males is similar, the male horns are relatively larger than female horns. This could be because males have to compete for females. The horn has been suggested to play roles in sexual selection, defense, as a tool for building burrows, or during conflict between individuals. Specifically, females may have evolved the horn to defend their burrow since they can only have a limited number of offspring due to their small reproductive system.

=== Chromatic variations ===
C. ensifer vary in color depending on their location. Those near the Amazon Rainforest exhibit bluer and darker colors while those near in the Atlantic Forest have green and brighter patterns. In the Cerrado, or the Brazilian savanna, beetles exhibit a variety of reflexes ranging from green to blue to red. Although the significance of the iridescence of C. ensifer has not been examined, it has been suggested to be a mechanism for a variety of things like defense against predators, sexual selection, or signaling.

=== Flight ===
Coprophanaeus beetles are known to fly for a short time after sunset. The short period of flight could be due to their diet. Carcasses are unpredictable, so it might be more efficient for the beetles to fly for a short amount of time to determine the presence of a carcass instead of using energy to fly long periods of time continuously looking for one.

== Relevance in forensics ==
Because of their necrophagous diet, this species has been regarded as forensically important. Homicide rates in Brazil have increased over the years, and necrophagous species have been associated with determining post-mortem information about cadavers. Although the distribution and diet of these species is understood, the actual use of the information in investigations is not well established in Brazil's forensic systems.
