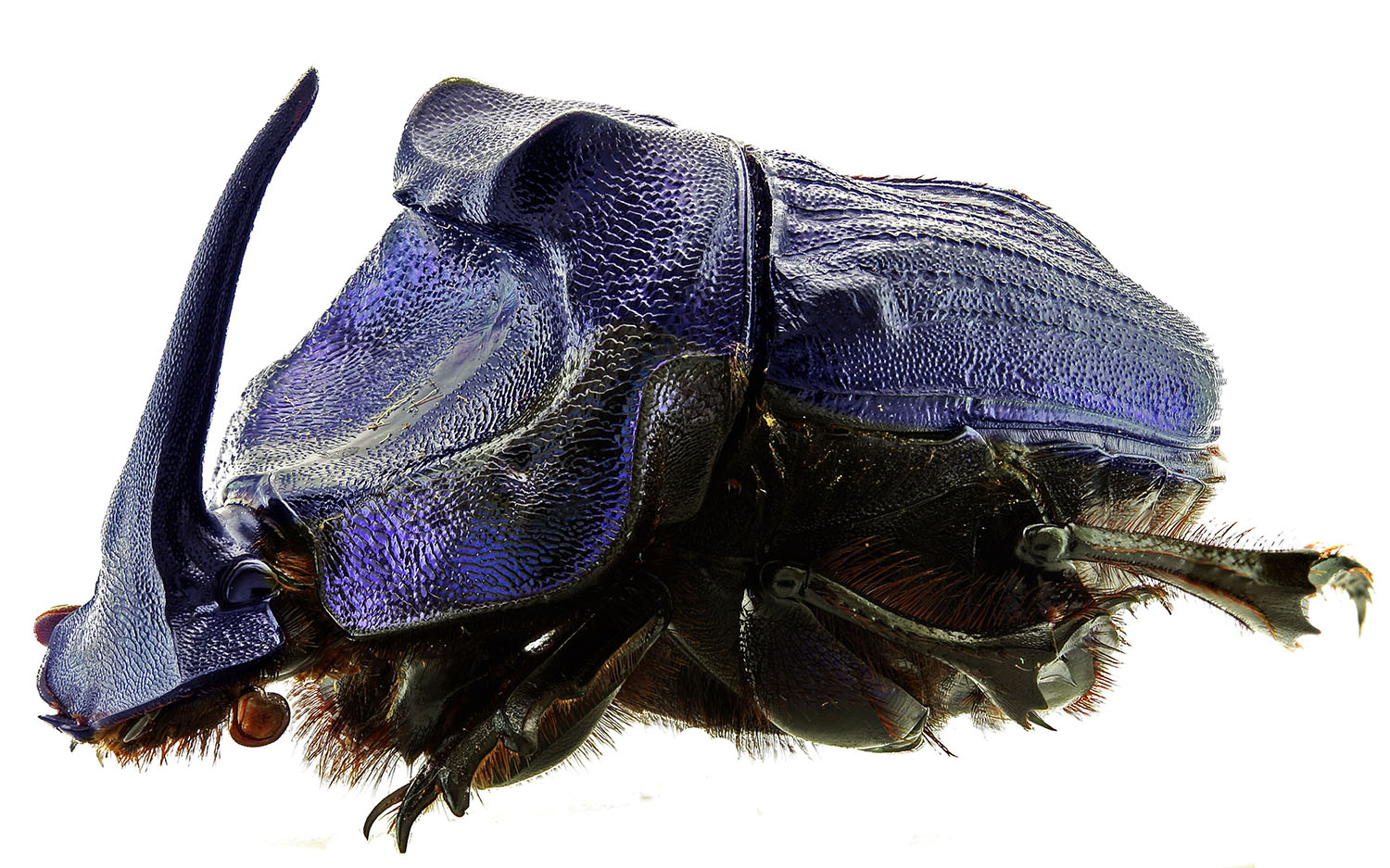
- Coprophanaeus lancifer

Scientific classification
- Kingdom: Animalia
- Phylum: Arthropoda
- Clade: Pancrustacea
- Class: Insecta
- Order: Coleoptera
- Suborder: Polyphaga
- Infraorder: Scarabaeiformia
- Family: Scarabaeidae
- Subfamily: Scarabaeinae
- Tribe: Phanaeini
- Genus: Coprophanaeus; D'Olsoufieff, 1924

= Coprophanaeus =

Genus of beetles

Coprophanaeus is a genus in the family Scarabaeidae (scarab beetles). The genus is almost entirely Neotropical, with a single species, C. pluto, ranging into southernmost Texas in the United States. They are medium-sized to large beetles, with the South American C. ensifer and C. lancifer sometimes exceeding 5 cm (2 in) in length, making these two some of the largest dung beetles in the world (together with certain Catharsius and Heliocopris) and the largest in the Americas. They often have a horn on the head, and are typically a bright metallic color, most often blue or green (other colors also occur, for example red), or black. These diurnal or crepuscular beetles are excellent diggers and good fliers.

Although part of the true dung beetle subfamily Scarabaeinae, adult and young Coprophanaeus primarily feed on carrion, but many species may also feed on feces. They are paracoprids, meaning that adults dig tunnels into the soil under the food source and move parts of the food source to a nest chamber where the eggs are laid. Because of their feeding on carrion, they are of interest to forensic entomology.

== Species ==
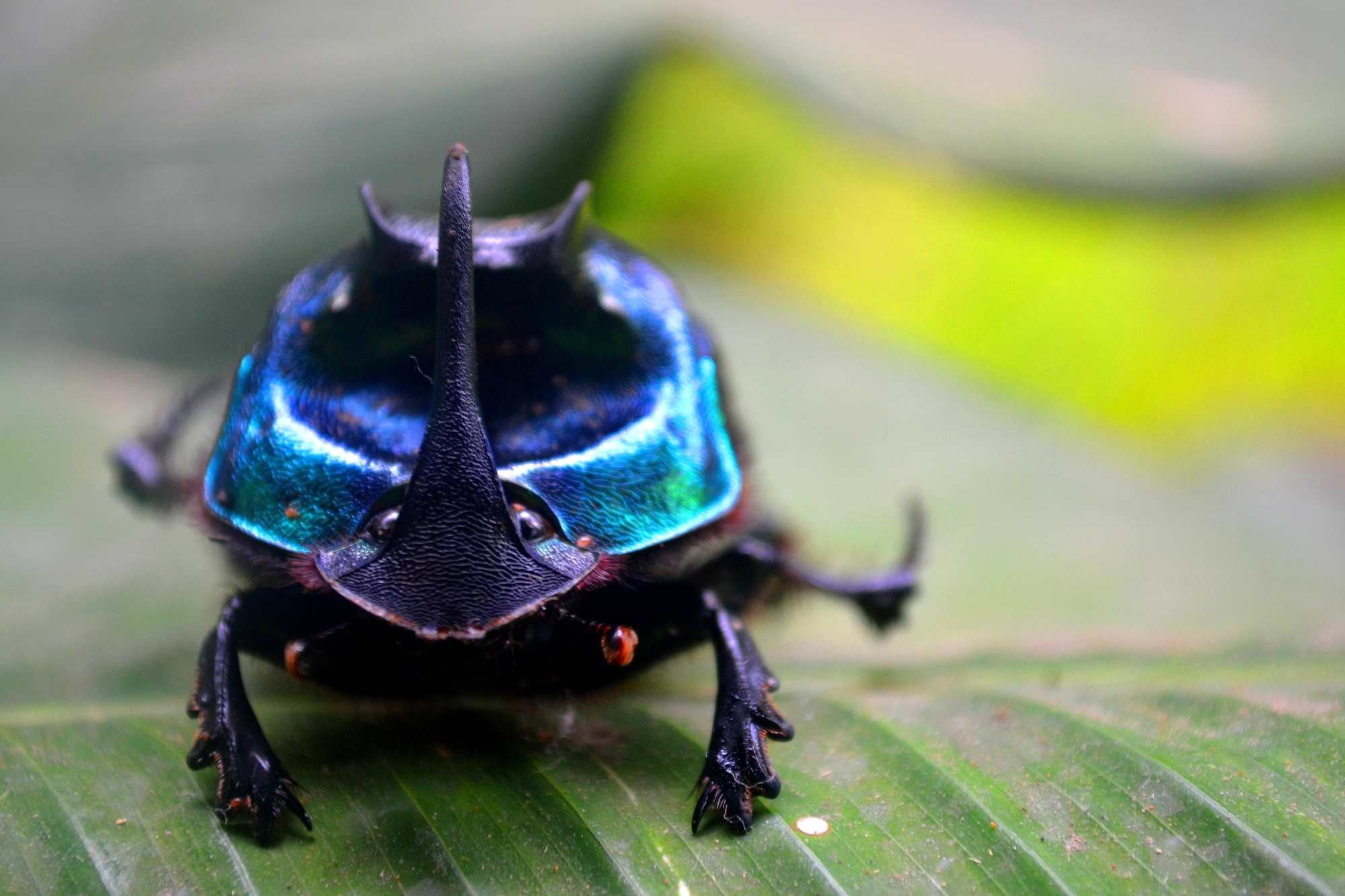
C. ensifer, a large species where both sexes have a large horn on the head

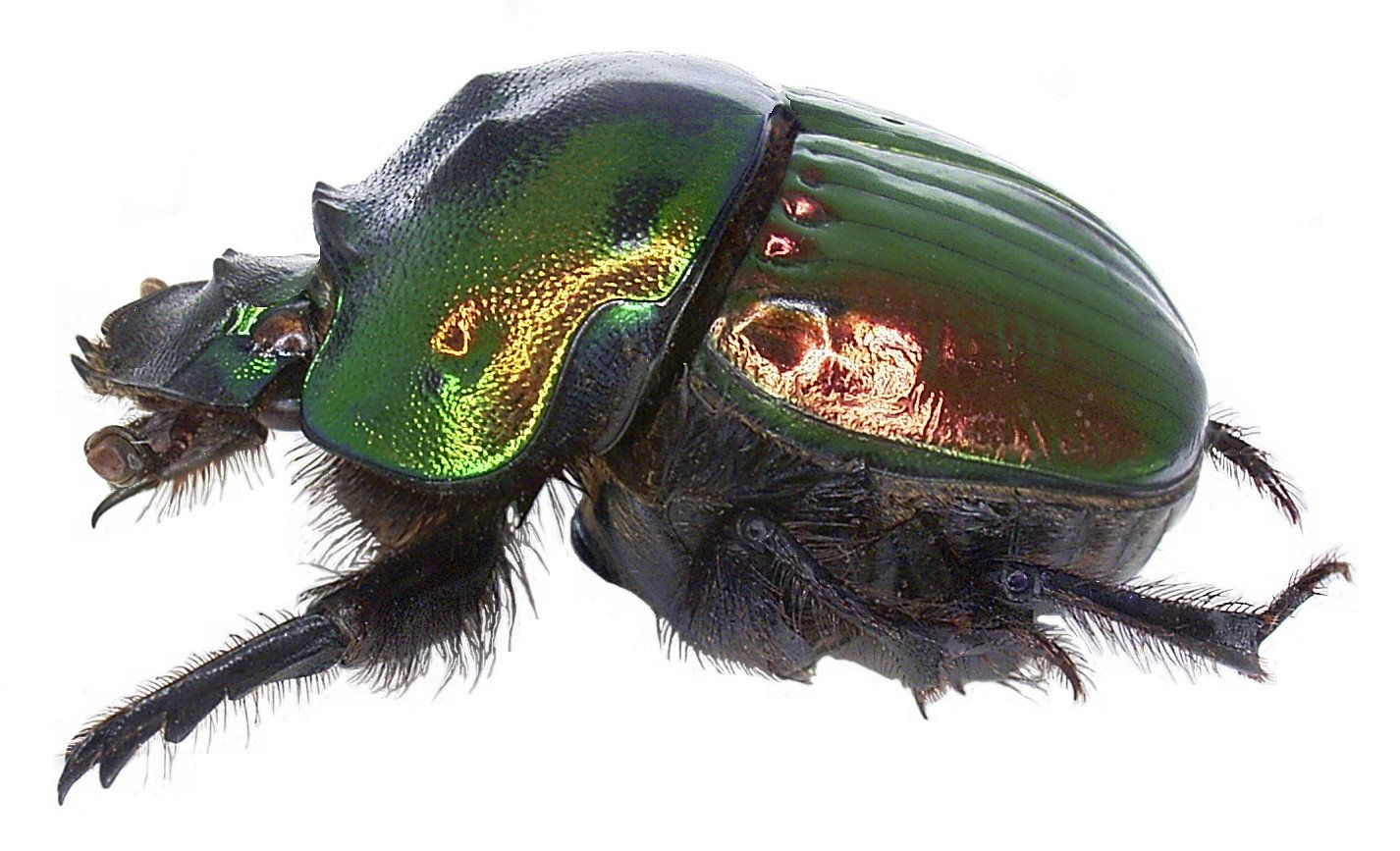
Female C. saphirinus, a common and variably colored species where only the male has a distinct horn

Coprophanaeus is divided into three subgenera: Coprophanaeus, Megaphanaeus and Metallophanaeus, but it doubtful that the first and last of these are monophyletic.

The genus includes the following species:

- Coprophanaeus abas (MacLeay, 1819)
- Coprophanaeus acrisius (MacLeay, 1819)
- Coprophanaeus bellicosus (Olivier, 1789)
- Coprophanaeus bonariensis (Gory, 1844)
- Coprophanaeus boucardi (Nevinson, 1891)
- Coprophanaeus callegarii Arnaud, 2002
- Coprophanaeus caroliae Edmonds, 2008
- Coprophanaeus cerberus (Harold, 1875)
- Coprophanaeus chiriquensis (Olsufieff, 1924)
- Coprophanaeus christophorowi (Olsufieff, 1924)
- Coprophanaeus conocephalus (Olsufieff, 1924)
- Coprophanaeus corythus (Harold, 1863)
- Coprophanaeus cyanescens (Olsufieff, 1924)
- Coprophanaeus dardanus (MacLeay, 1819)
- Coprophanaeus degallieri Arnaud, 1997
- Coprophanaeus ensifer (Germar, 1821)
- Coprophanaeus gamezi Arnaud, 2002
- Coprophanaeus gephyra Kohlmann & Solís, 2012
- Coprophanaeus gilli Arnaud, 1997
- Coprophanaeus horus (Waterhouse, 1891)
- Coprophanaeus ignecinctus (Felsche, 1909)
- Coprophanaeus jasius (Olivier, 1789)
- Coprophanaeus lancifer (Linnaeus, 1767)
- Coprophanaeus magnoi Arnaud, 2002
- Coprophanaeus milon (Blanchard, 1846)
- Coprophanaeus morenoi Arnaud, 1982
- Coprophanaeus ohausi (Felsche, 1911)
- Coprophanaeus parvulus (Olsufieff, 1924)
- Coprophanaeus pecki Howden & Young, 1981
- Coprophanaeus pertyi (Olsufieff, 1924)
- Coprophanaeus pessoai (Pereira, 1949)
- Coprophanaeus pluto (Harold, 1863)
- Coprophanaeus punctatus (Olsufieff, 1924)
- Coprophanaeus saphirinus (Sturm, 1826)
- Coprophanaeus solisi Arnaud, 1997
- Coprophanaeus spitzi (Pessôa, 1934)
- Coprophanaeus suredai Arnaud, 1996
- Coprophanaeus telamon (Erichson, 1847)
- Coprophanaeus thalassinus (Perty, 1830)
