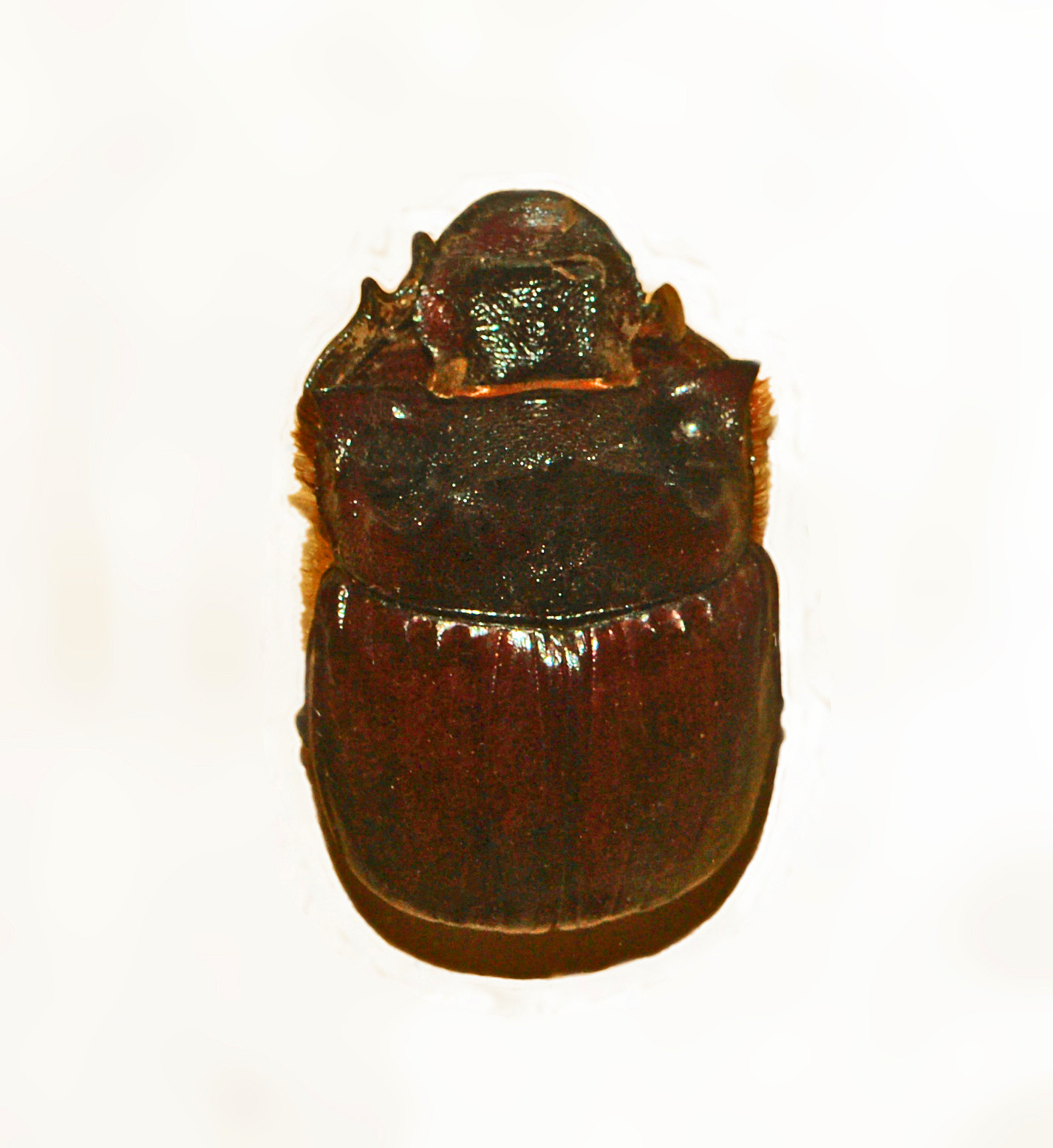
- Male

Scientific classification
- Kingdom: Animalia
- Phylum: Arthropoda
- Class: Insecta
- Order: Coleoptera
- Suborder: Polyphaga
- Infraorder: Scarabaeiformia
- Family: Scarabaeidae
- Genus: Heliocopris
- Species: H. hamadryas

Binomial name
- Heliocopris hamadryas (Fabricius, 1775)

Synonyms
- Copris hamadryas Fabricius, 1775

= Heliocopris hamadryas =

Species of beetle

Heliocopris hamadryas is a species of beetles of the family Scarabaeidae.

== Description ==
Heliocopris hamadryas reaches about 39–53 millimetres (1.5–2.1 in) in length. The body is glossy and the coloration varies from dark brown to black. These beetles form balls with dung, into which females lay eggs. Larvae feed and pupate within the dung balls and emerge as adult beetles.

== Distribution ==
This species occurs in Angola, Democratic Republic of Congo, Kenya, Malawi, Mozambique, Rwanda, Somalia, Tanzania, Uganda, Zambia, Zimbabwe
