= Coprophanaeus telamon =

Scientific classification
- Kingdom: Animalia
- Phylum: Arthropoda
- Clade: Pancrustacea
- Class: Insecta
- Order: Coleoptera
- Suborder: Polyphaga
- Infraorder: Scarabaeiformia
- Family: Scarabaeidae
- Genus: Coprophanaeus
- Species: C. telamon

Binomial name
- Coprophanaeus telamon (Erichson, 1847)

Synonyms
- Phanaeus telamon Erichson, 1847

Species of beetle

Coprophanaeus telamon is a species of beetle of the family Scarabaeidae. It is found in Bolivia, Brazil (Acre, Amazonas, Goiás, Mato Grosso, Rondônia), Colombia, Ecuador, Peru and Venezuela.
