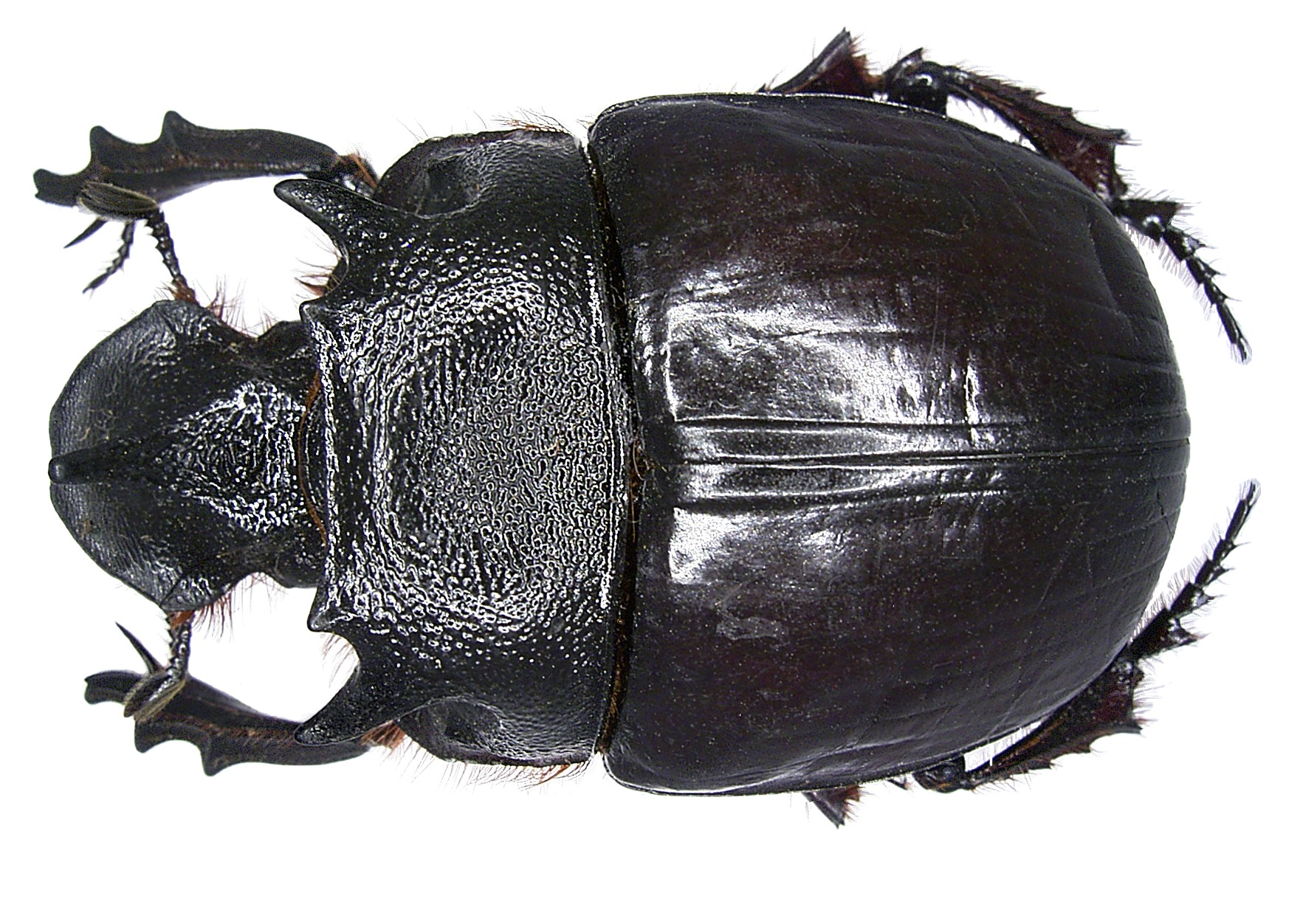

Scientific classification
- Kingdom: Animalia
- Phylum: Arthropoda
- Clade: Pancrustacea
- Class: Insecta
- Order: Coleoptera
- Suborder: Polyphaga
- Infraorder: Scarabaeiformia
- Family: Scarabaeidae
- Genus: Heliocopris
- Species: H. bucephalus

Binomial name
- Heliocopris bucephalus (Fabricius, 1775)

Synonyms
- Scarabaeus bucephalus Fabricius, 1775; Scarabaeus cristatus Degeer, 1778; Heliocopris bucephalus Arrow, 1931; Heliocopris bucephalus Balthasar, 1963; Heliocopris bucephalus Chandra, 2005

= Heliocopris bucephalus =

Species of beetle

Heliocopris bucephalus, commonly known as the elephant dung beetle, is a species of dung beetle found in India, Sri Lanka, Bangladesh, Myanmar, Malay Peninsula, Java, Vietnam, Laos, and Cambodia.

== Description ==
This large, broad, globular, and quadrate species has an average length of about 39 to 55 mm. The body is black whereas the elytra and ventrum are usually deep red in color. The legs and ventrum are covered with coarse rust-red hair. They have a small head and the pronotum is coarsely rugose. The elytra are very smooth, shiny, and very lightly striate. The clypeus is moderately fine, whereas the vertex is more coarse and transversely strigose. The pronotum is either very unevenly rugose or reticulate.

Males are smaller and more red than females. Females are almost entirely black in color. Males possess a slender, curved, and pointed horn. They also have a maximum and minor phase with changes in the head and pronotum. In females, the head is strongly transverse with transverse carina.

Adults are common at night, in the months of August and September. The urease-negative basidiomycetous yeast called Trichosporon heliocopridis is known to be associated with adult beetles of the species. In Thailand, the species is considered an edible food.
