= Catharsius capucinus =

Scientific classification
- Kingdom: Animalia
- Phylum: Arthropoda
- Clade: Pancrustacea
- Class: Insecta
- Order: Coleoptera
- Suborder: Polyphaga
- Infraorder: Scarabaeiformia
- Family: Scarabaeidae
- Genus: Catharsius
- Species: C. capucinus

Binomial name
- Catharsius capucinus (Fabricius, 1781)

Synonyms
- Scarabaeus capucinus Fabricius, 1781; Catharsius capucinus Arrow, 1931

Species of beetle

Catharsius capucinus, is a species of dung beetle found in India, Sri Lanka, Bangladesh and Nepal.

== Description ==
Average length if about 18 to 26 mm.
