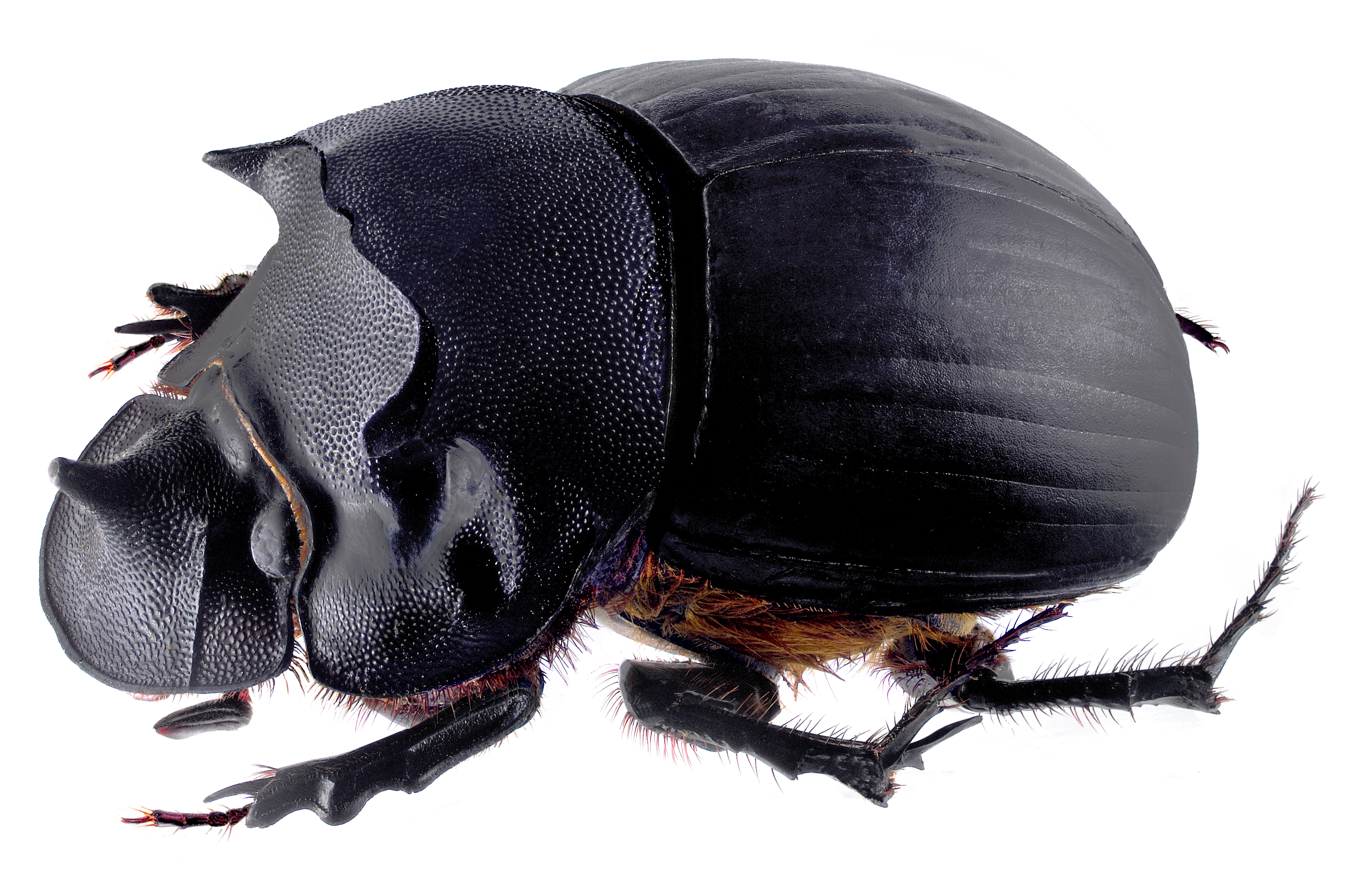

Scientific classification
- Kingdom: Animalia
- Phylum: Arthropoda
- Class: Insecta
- Order: Coleoptera
- Suborder: Polyphaga
- Infraorder: Scarabaeiformia
- Family: Scarabaeidae
- Genus: Catharsius
- Species: C. granulatus

Binomial name
- Catharsius granulatus Sharp, 1875

= Catharsius granulatus =

Species of beetle

Catharsius granulatus is a species of dung beetle found in India, Pakistan, Sri Lanka, Afghanistan, Nepal, Sikkim, China, Taiwan, Andaman Islands, Vietnam, Laos, Cambodia, Thailand, Malaysia, and Sunda Islands.

== Description ==
This broadly oval, very convex species has an average length of about 23 to 32 mm.
