= Catharsius oryx =

Scientific classification
- Kingdom: Animalia
- Phylum: Arthropoda
- Clade: Pancrustacea
- Class: Insecta
- Order: Coleoptera
- Suborder: Polyphaga
- Infraorder: Scarabaeiformia
- Family: Scarabaeidae
- Genus: Catharsius
- Species: C. oryx

Binomial name
- Catharsius oryx Frey, 1974

Species of beetle

Catharsius oryx is a species of beetle of the family Scarabaeidae. It is found in Cameroon.

== Description ==
Adults reach a length of about 25–26 mm. They are glossy black. They have a conical horn, which is slightly inclined forward and blunt at the tip. The pronotum is densely but briefly fringed with light brown cilia in the middle anteriorly. On the disc are two straight, slightly diverging, conical horns, only slightly inclined laterally above and blunt at the tips. The elytra are continuously striated.
