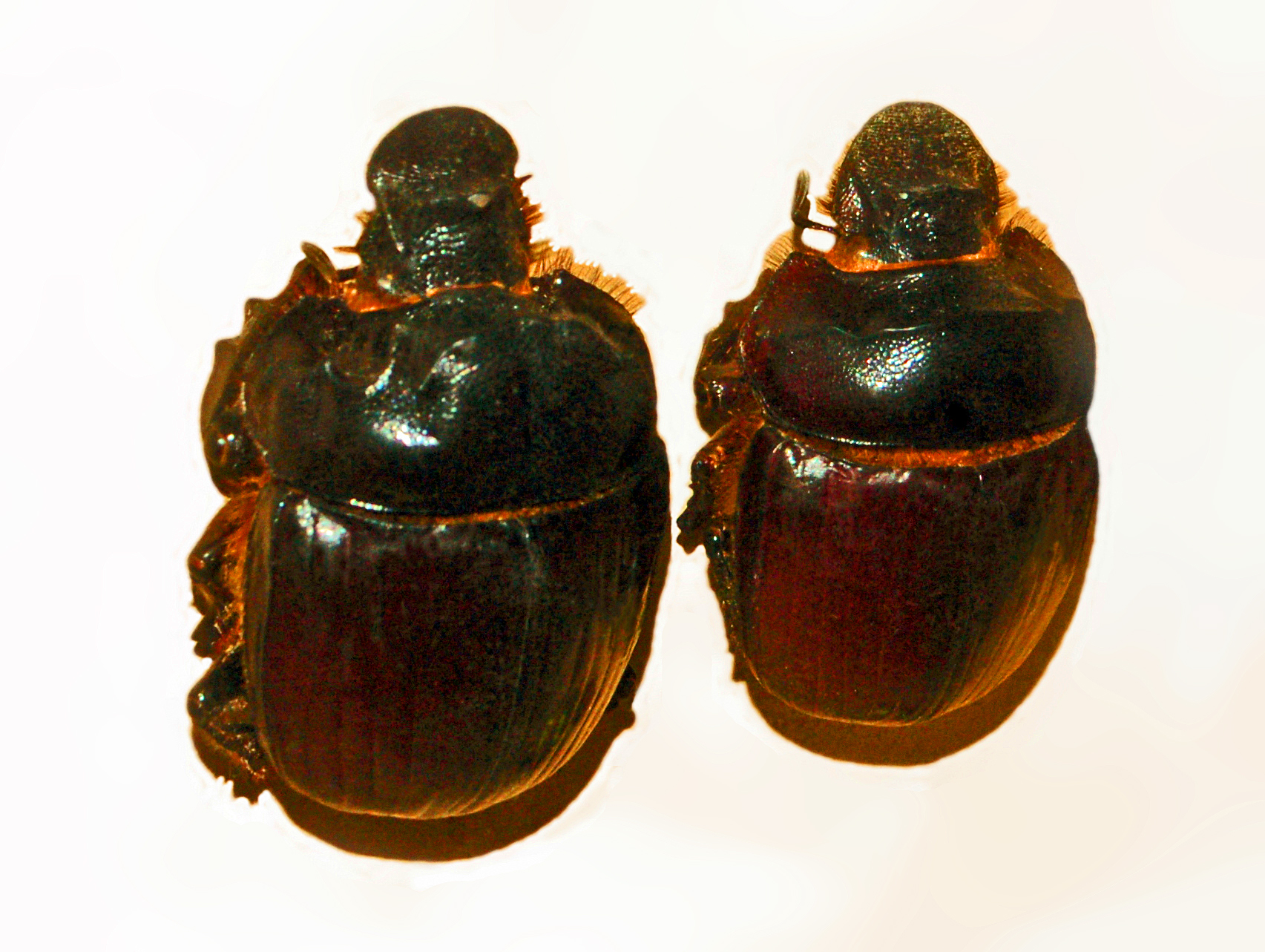
- Heliocopris antenor from Guinea-Bissau

Scientific classification
- Kingdom: Animalia
- Phylum: Arthropoda
- Clade: Pancrustacea
- Class: Insecta
- Order: Coleoptera
- Suborder: Polyphaga
- Infraorder: Scarabaeiformia
- Family: Scarabaeidae
- Genus: Heliocopris
- Species: H. antenor

Binomial name
- Heliocopris antenor (Olivier, 1789)

Synonyms
- Copris antenor Olivier, 1789; Heliocopris exclamationis Shipp, 1897

= Heliocopris antenor =

Species of beetle

Heliocopris antenor is a species of beetles of the family Scarabaeidae.

== Description ==
Heliocopris antenor reaches about 50 millimetres (2.0 in) in length. The body is glossy and the coloration varies from dark brown to black.

== Distribution ==
This species occurs in Senegal and Guinea-Bissau
