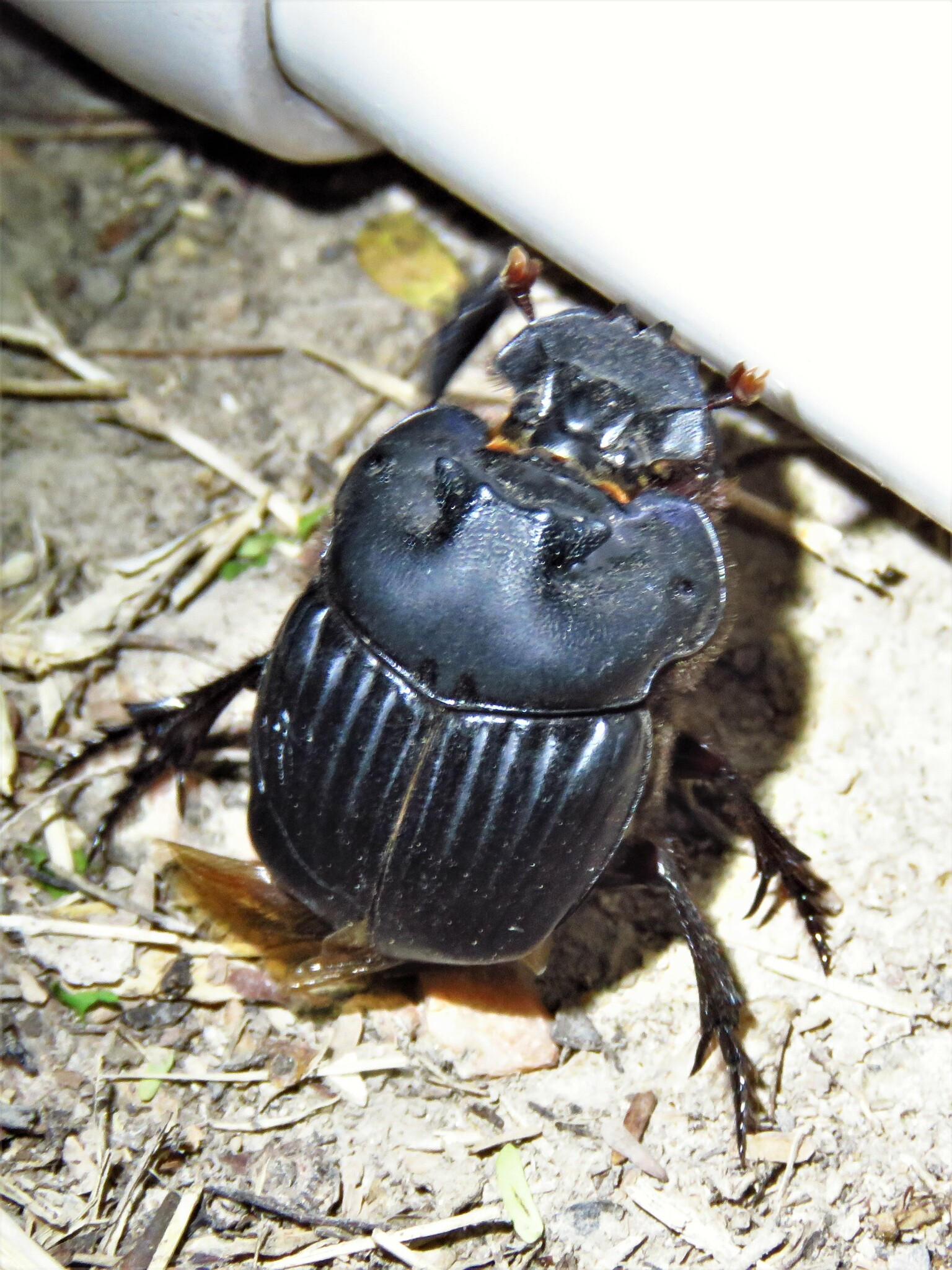
- Coprophanaeus pluto, Texas

Scientific classification
- Domain: Eukaryota
- Kingdom: Animalia
- Phylum: Arthropoda
- Class: Insecta
- Order: Coleoptera
- Suborder: Polyphaga
- Infraorder: Scarabaeiformia
- Family: Scarabaeidae
- Genus: Coprophanaeus
- Species: C. pluto

Binomial name
- Coprophanaeus pluto (Harold, 1863)

Synonyms
- Coprophanaeus pluto noguerai Arnaud, 2002

= Coprophanaeus pluto =

Species of beetle

Coprophanaeus pluto is a species of dung beetle in the family Scarabaeidae. It is found in Guatemala, Mexico and southernmost Texas (records from southernmost Arizona are doubtful); it is the only species of Coprophanaeus in the United States. This black beetle feeds on carrion and typically is 1.8–2.8 cm (0.7–1.1 in) long.
