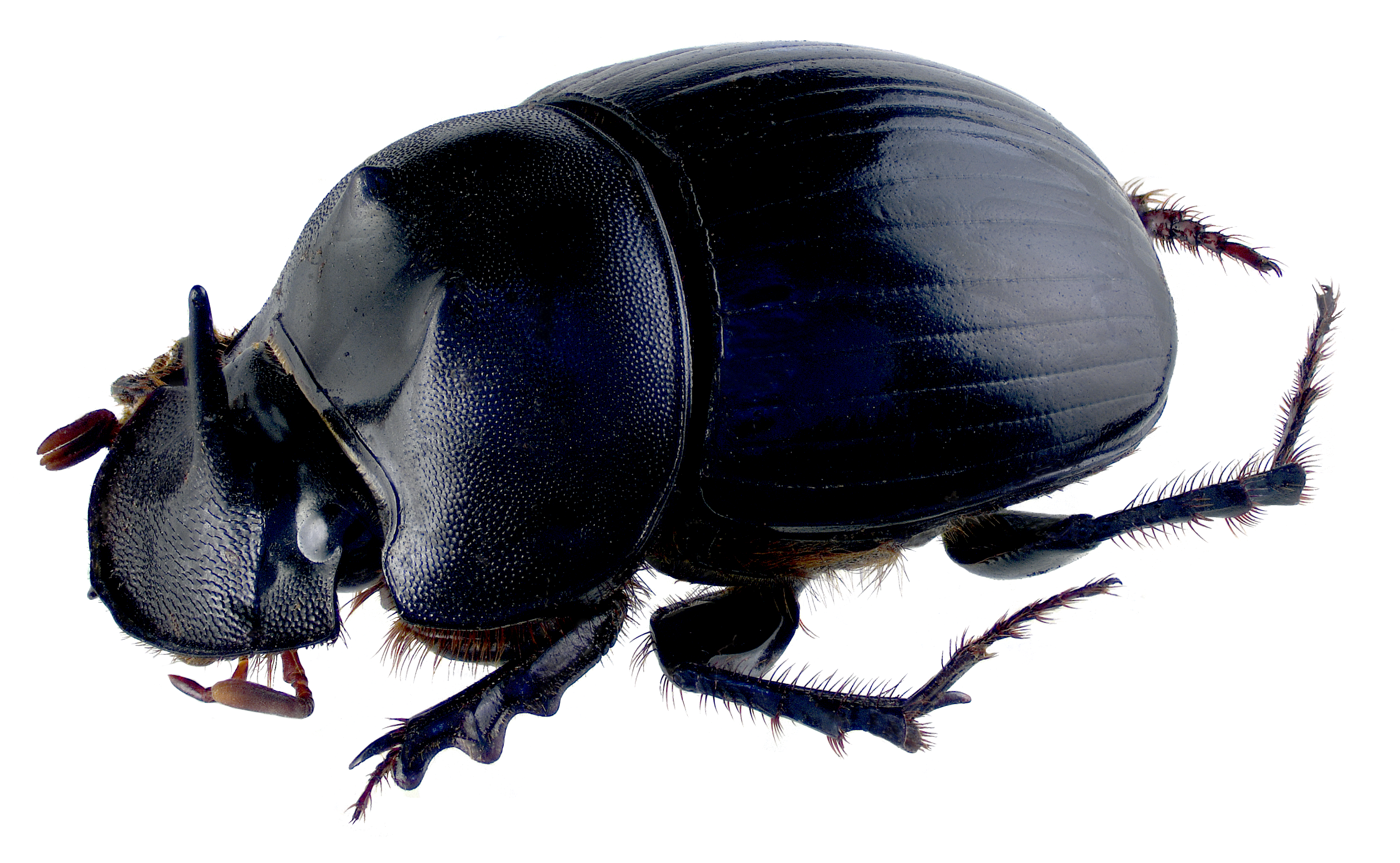

Scientific classification
- Kingdom: Animalia
- Phylum: Arthropoda
- Class: Insecta
- Order: Coleoptera
- Suborder: Polyphaga
- Infraorder: Scarabaeiformia
- Family: Scarabaeidae
- Genus: Catharsius
- Species: C. pithecius

Binomial name
- Catharsius pithecius (Fabricius, 1775)

Synonyms
- Scarabaeus pithecius Fabricius, 1775; Copris cribricollis Walker, 1858; Copris sinensis Hope, 1842; Scarabaeus nanus Fabricius, 1792; Scarabaeus sabaeus Fabricius, 1781

= Catharsius pithecius =

Species of beetle

Catharsius pithecius, is a species of dung beetle found in India, Sri Lanka, Pakistan and China.

== Description ==
This oval, very convex species has an average length of about 15 to 23 mm. Body black and shiny. Pronotum partly or entirely opaque. Antennae, and mouthparts are reddish. Legs and ventrum covered with reddish hairy clothing. Head semi-circular, where there is a slender horn in shiny head in male arising just in front of eyes. Female has more deeply sculptured and less shiny head. Clypeus very feeble and closely strigose. In males, there is a slight sharp conical protuberance on each side of the median line in pronotum. Whereas, female has a median longitudinal furrow in the basal part of pronotum. Elytra fine and distinctly striate. Pygidium fine and punctured. Elytra not very dense and there are two very prominent tubercles on pronotum.

Mites such as Poecilochirus coimbatorensis, Macrocheles scarabae and Pachylaelaps catharsiae are closely associated with the adult beetles.
