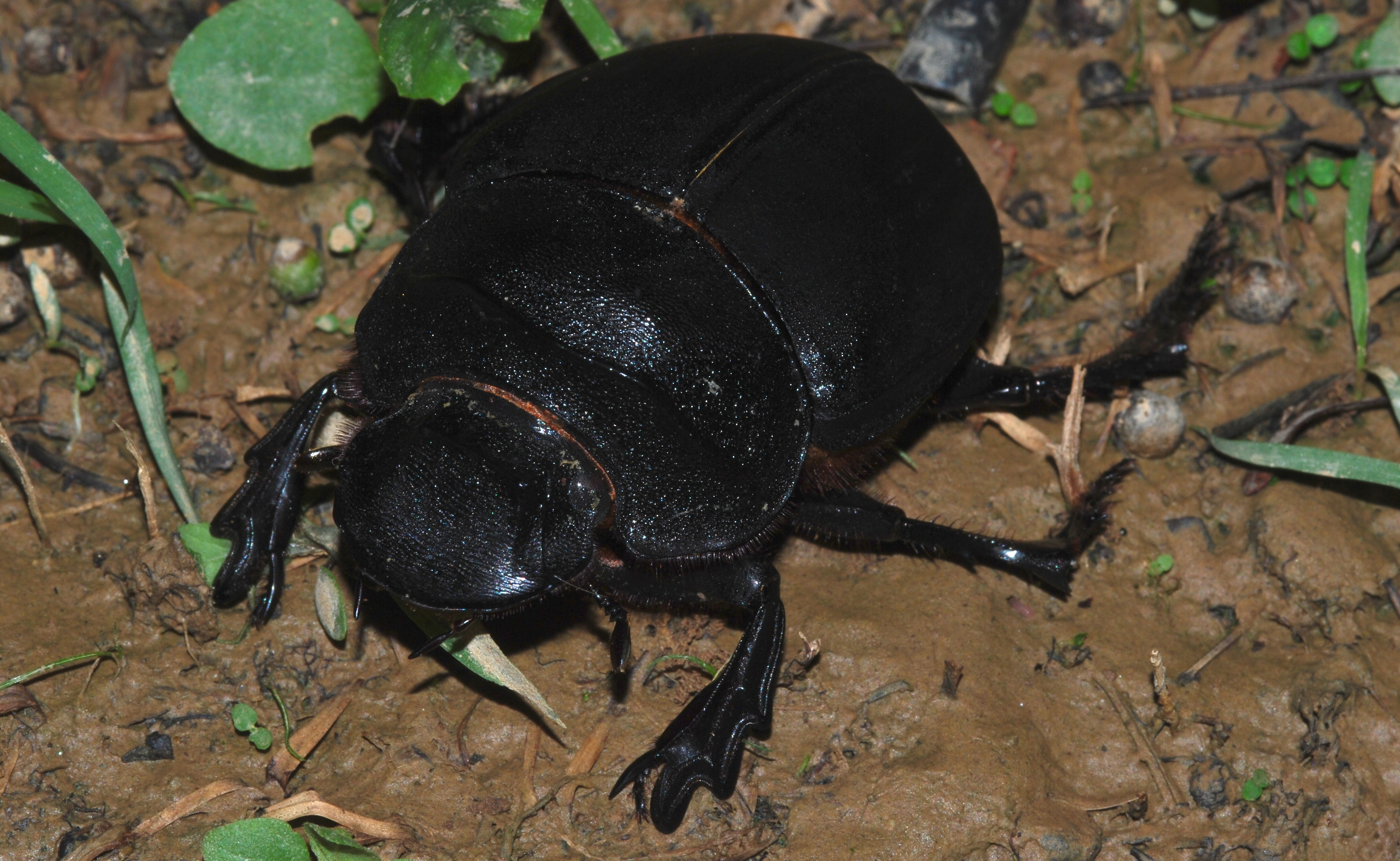
- A female H. tyrannus observed in the wild in Kuala Tahan, Pahang, Malaysia

Scientific classification
- Kingdom: Animalia
- Phylum: Arthropoda
- Clade: Pancrustacea
- Class: Insecta
- Order: Coleoptera
- Suborder: Polyphaga
- Infraorder: Scarabaeiformia
- Family: Scarabaeidae
- Genus: Heliocopris
- Species: H. tyrannus

Binomial name
- Heliocopris tyrannus (Thomson, 1859)

Synonyms
- Heliocopris tyrannus Thomson, 1858; Copris tyrannus Thomson, 1858; Heliocopris sturleri Harold, 1879

= Heliocopris tyrannus =

Species of dung beetle

Heliocopris tyrannus is a species of dung beetle found in Java, Malaysia, and Sumatra. No subspecies are listed in the 2011 Catalogue of Life.
