= Coprophanaeus magnoi =

Scientific classification
- Kingdom: Animalia
- Phylum: Arthropoda
- Clade: Pancrustacea
- Class: Insecta
- Order: Coleoptera
- Suborder: Polyphaga
- Infraorder: Scarabaeiformia
- Family: Scarabaeidae
- Genus: Coprophanaeus
- Species: C. magnoi

Binomial name
- Coprophanaeus magnoi Arnaud, 2002

Synonyms
- Coprophanaeus milon magnoi Arnaud, 2002

Species of beetle

Coprophanaeus magnoi is a species of beetle of the family Scarabaeidae. It is found in Bolivia, Brazil (Mato Grosso, Goiás, Minas Gerais, Paraná, São Paulo) and Peru.
