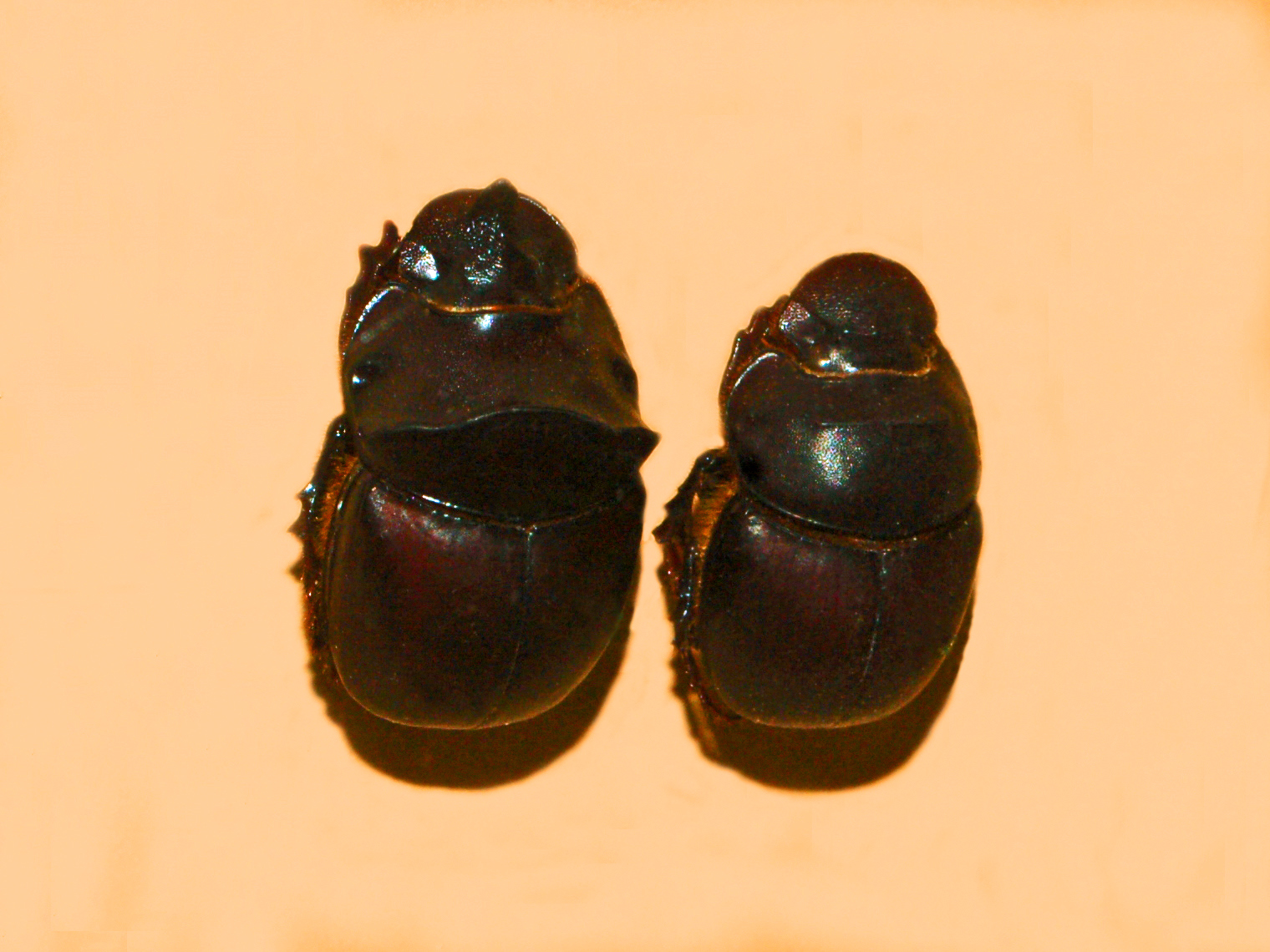
- Catharsius gorilla from Guinea. Male and female

Scientific classification
- Domain: Eukaryota
- Kingdom: Animalia
- Phylum: Arthropoda
- Class: Insecta
- Order: Coleoptera
- Suborder: Polyphaga
- Infraorder: Scarabaeiformia
- Family: Scarabaeidae
- Genus: Catharsius
- Species: C. gorilla

Binomial name
- Catharsius gorilla Thomson, 1858

= Catharsius gorilla =

Species of beetle

Catharsius gorilla is a species of African dung beetles of the family Scarabaeidae. This species is widespread in the tropical African regions (Senegal, Guinea, Nigeria, Chad, Gabon, Democratic Republic of Congo, Tanzania).
