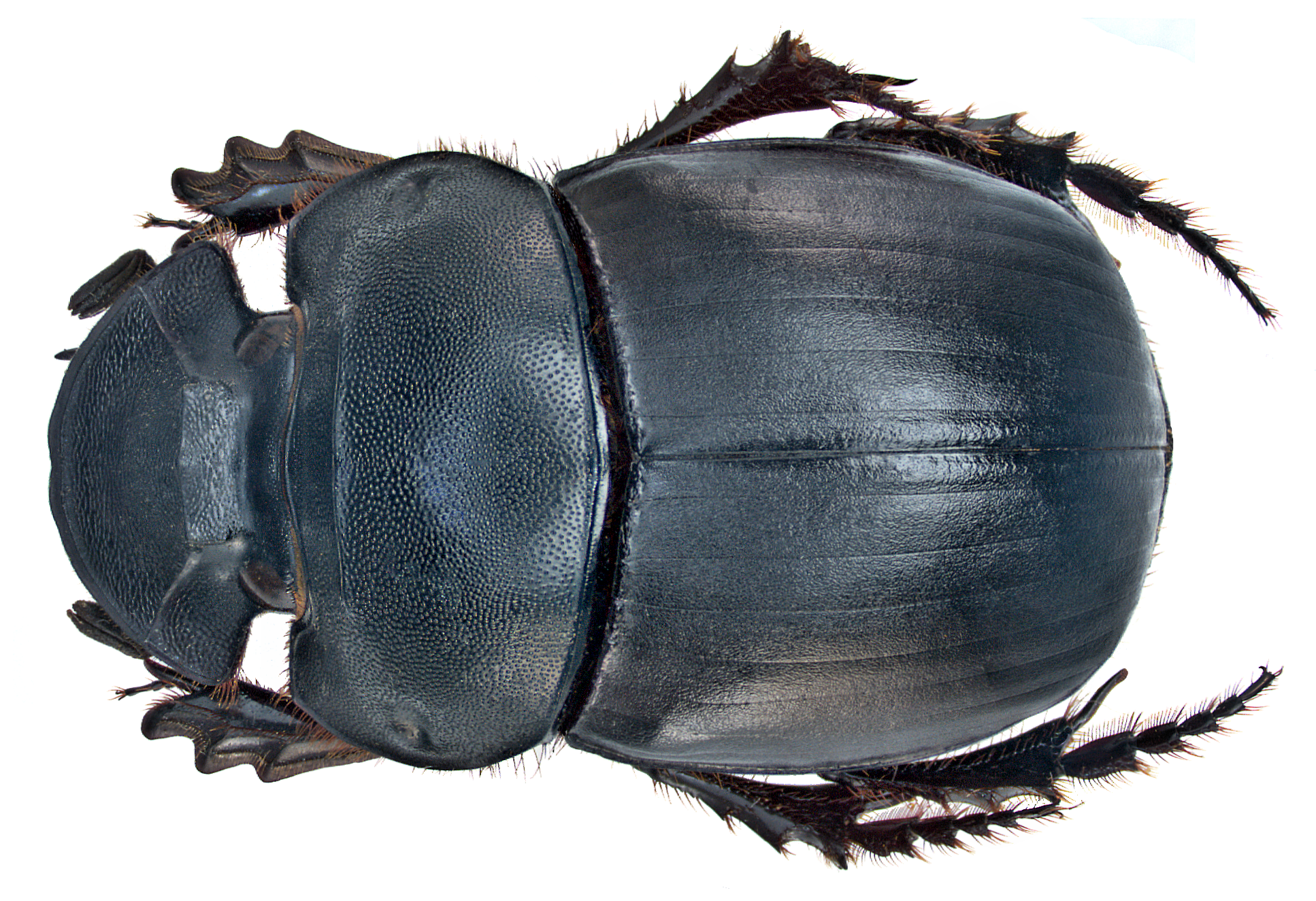
- Catharsius molossus from Vietnam

Scientific classification
- Kingdom: Animalia
- Phylum: Arthropoda
- Clade: Pancrustacea
- Class: Insecta
- Order: Coleoptera
- Suborder: Polyphaga
- Infraorder: Scarabaeiformia
- Family: Scarabaeidae
- Genus: Catharsius
- Species: C. molossus

Binomial name
- Catharsius molossus (Linnaeus, 1758)

Synonyms
- List: Catharsius borneensis Paulian, 1936; Catharsius dubius Paulian, 1936; Catharsius kangeanus Paulian, 1936; Catharsius timorensis Lansberge, 1879; Copris urus Fabricius, 1801; Scarabaeus abbreviatus Herbst, 1789; Scarabaeus berbiceus Herbst, 1789; Scarabaeus janus Olivier, 1789; Scarabaeus molossus Linnaeus, 1758

= Catharsius molossus =

Species of beetle

Catharsius molossus is a species of dung beetle in the family Scarabaeidae.

== Description ==
Catharsius molossus can reach a length of about 25–35 millimetres (0.98–1.38 in) in the females, about 45 millimetres (1.8 in) in males. This species is completely black, the body is short and convex, quite hairy on the ventral side and usually with a short conical horn in the centre of the head of the males. Pronotum is densely granulated and elytra are finely striated. It is used in traditional Chinese medicine for detoxification, swelling and constipation.

== Distribution ==
Catharsius molossus is one of the most widespread and abundant coprophagous species in tropical Asian regions. It occurs in the Palearctic realm (Afghanistan, Nepal, Sikkim, China, Taiwan), and in the Oriental realm (India, Sri Lanka, Andaman Islands, Vietnam, Laos, Cambodia, Thailand, Malaysia, Timor, and Flores).
