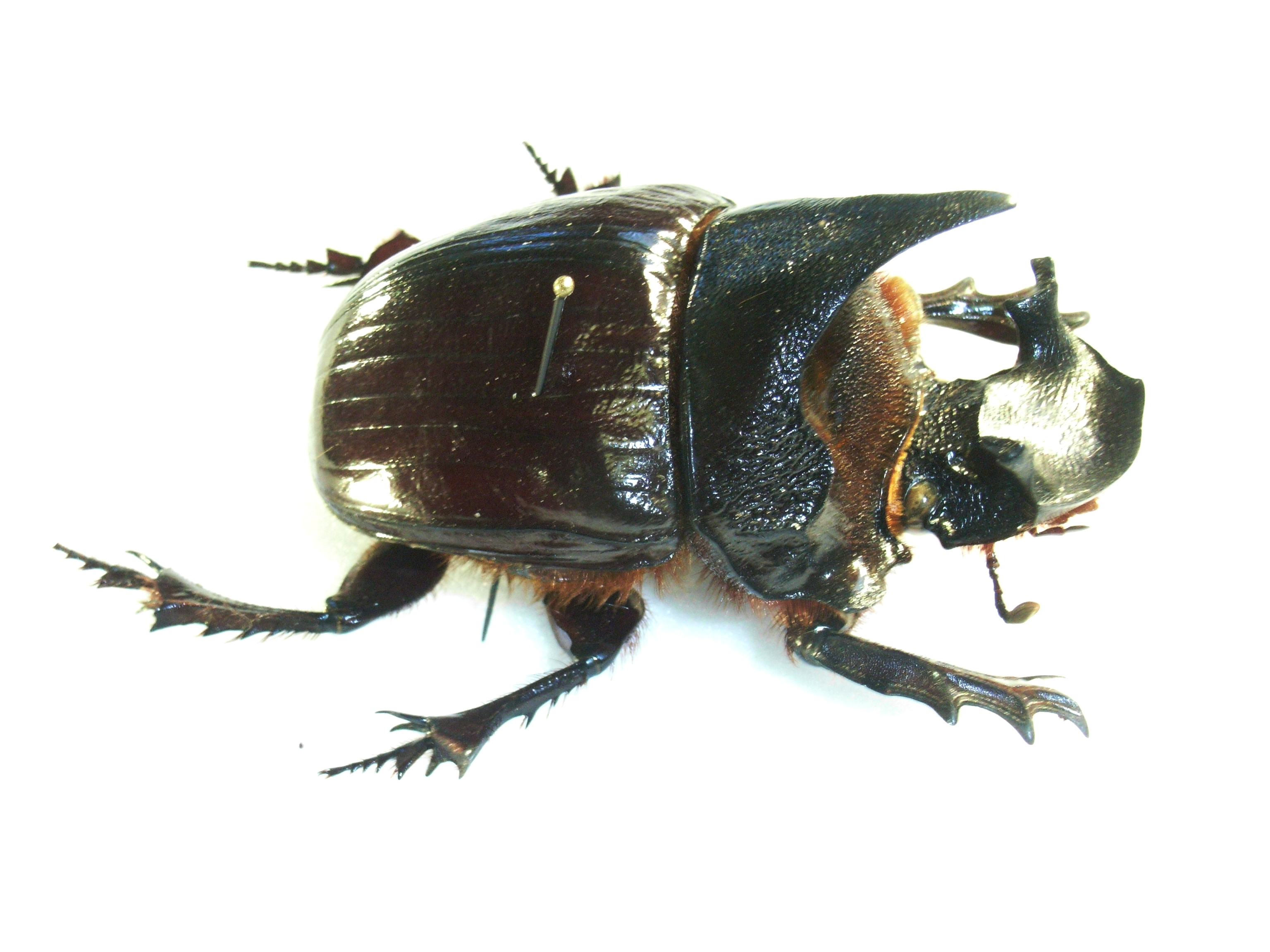
- Heliocopris dominus

Scientific classification
- Kingdom: Animalia
- Phylum: Arthropoda
- Class: Insecta
- Order: Coleoptera
- Suborder: Polyphaga
- Infraorder: Scarabaeiformia
- Family: Scarabaeidae
- Subfamily: Scarabaeinae
- Tribe: Coprini
- Genus: Heliocopris; Hope, 1837

Species
- See text

= Heliocopris =

Genus of beetles

Heliocopris (large dung beetles) is a genus of Scarabaeidae or scarab beetles in the superfamily Scarabaeoidea. Forty-seven of the fifty-two known species are found in Africa, but a few are found in southern and southeast Asia.

Heliocopris includes some of the world's largest dung beetles (their size only rivalled by certain Catharsius and Coprophanaeus), with H. anderson, H. colossus, H. dilloni, H. dominus, H. gigas and H. tyrannus reaching up to about 7 cm (2.8 in) long, although a more typical size for the members of this genus is 3–5 cm (1.2–2.0 in). They are generally black or dark brown beetles where males tend to have horns on their head or pronotum, which females lack. Some are associated with the dung of elephants, rhinos or hippos, but there are large variations among the species in the genus and dung from other animals, like domestic cattle or monkeys, is also used. The female lays her eggs in a tunnel she digs under the excrement.

Heliocopris has been placed in the tribe Dichotomiini, but Montreuil places them in Coprini.Montreuil, Olivier (1998). "Analyse phylogénétique et paraphylie des Coprini et Dichotomiini (Coleoptera: Scarabaeidae). Scénario biogéographique". Annales de la Société Entomologique de France. 34 (2): 135–148. doi:10.1080/21686351.1998.12277767. S2CID 82053231.

== Species ==
The genus Heliocopris includes the following species:

- Heliocopris alatus Felsche, 1910
- Heliocopris anadematus Gillet, 1908
- Heliocopris andersoni Bates, 1868
- Heliocopris anguliceps Janssens, 1943
- Heliocopris antenor (Olivier, 1789)
- Heliocopris ares Philippe, Minetti, 2022
- Heliocopris atropos Boheman, 1860
- Heliocopris beccarii Harold, 1871
- Heliocopris biimpressus Kolbe, 1893
- Heliocopris bucephalus (Fabricius, 1775)
- Heliocopris camerunus Pokorny & Zidek, 2009
- Heliocopris colossus Bates, 1868
- Heliocopris corniculatus Janssens, 1939
- Heliocopris coronatus Felsche, 1901
- Heliocopris cuneifer Lesne, 1906
- Heliocopris densissa Roth, 1851
- Heliocopris dianae Hope, 1842
- Heliocopris dilloni Guérin-Méneville, 1847
- Heliocopris dolosus Janssens, 1939
- Heliocopris dominus Bates, 1868
- Heliocopris erycoides Felsche, 1907
- Heliocopris eryx (Fabricius, 1801)
- Heliocopris faunus Boheman, 1857
- Heliocopris felschei Kolbe, 1904
- Heliocopris fonsecai Ferreira, 1967
- Heliocopris furcithorax Müller, 1941
- Heliocopris gigas (Linnaeus, 1758)
- Heliocopris hamadryas (Fabricius, 1775)
- Heliocopris hamifer Harold, 1878
- Heliocopris haroldi Kolbe, 1893
- Heliocopris helleri Felsche, 1907
- Heliocopris hermes Gillet, 1911
- Heliocopris hunteri Waterhouse, 1891
- Heliocopris japetus Klug, 1855
- Heliocopris kolbei Felsche, 1901
- Heliocopris marshalli Péringuey, 1901
- Heliocopris midas (Fabricius, 1775)
- Heliocopris mimus Janssens, 1939
- Heliocopris minos Gillet, 1907
- Heliocopris mutabilis Kolbe, 1893
- Heliocopris myrmidon Kolbe, 1893
- Heliocopris neptuniformis Felsche, 1907
- Heliocopris neptunoides Janssens, 1939
- Heliocopris neptunus Boheman, 1857
- Heliocopris pauliani Janssens, 1939
- Heliocopris pirmal (Fabricius, 1798)
- Heliocopris quinqueangulatus Janssens, 1939
- Heliocopris samson Harold, 1878
- Heliocopris sirius Gillet, 1925
- Heliocopris solitarius Kolbe, 1893
- Heliocopris staudingeri Kolbe, 1893
- Heliocopris sylvanus Gillet, 1925
- Heliocopris tyrannus Thomson, 1859
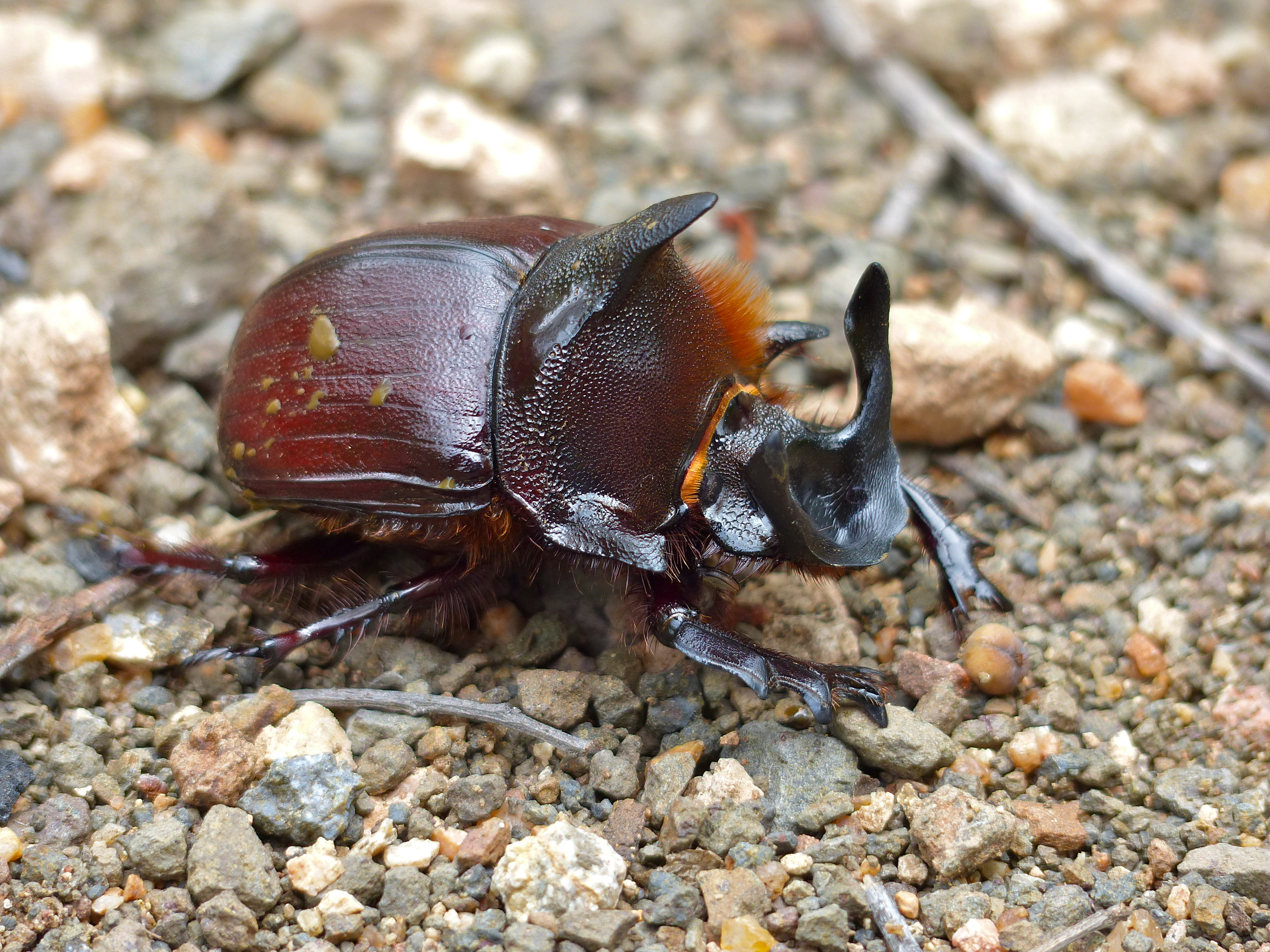
Heliocopris andersoni

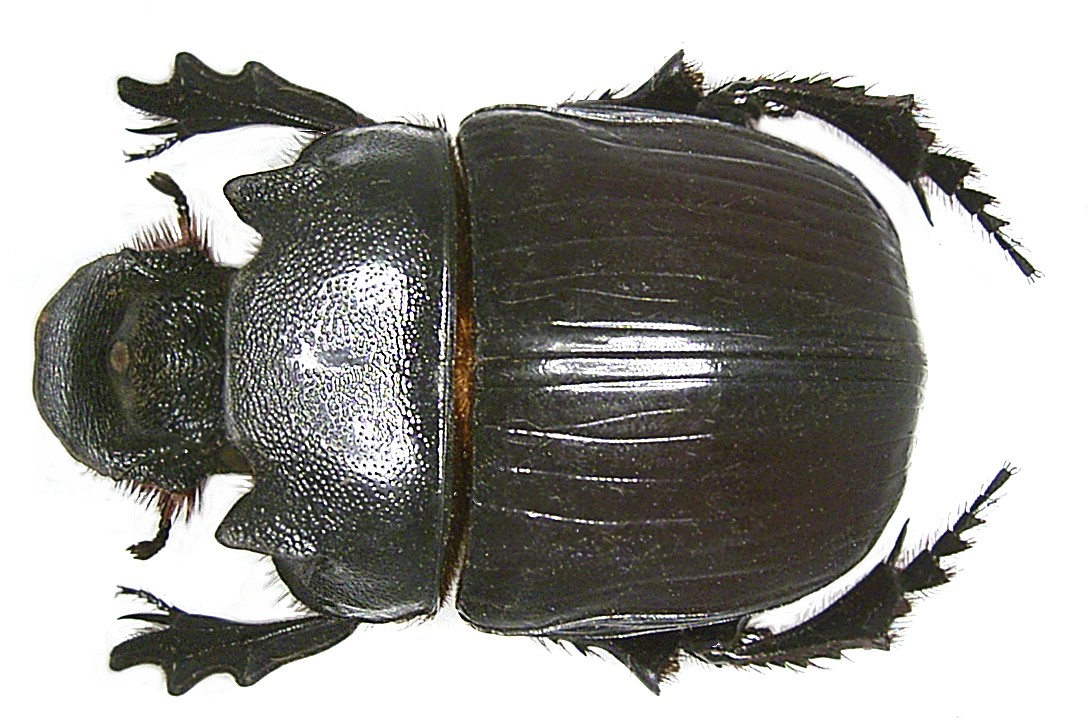
Heliocopris colossus

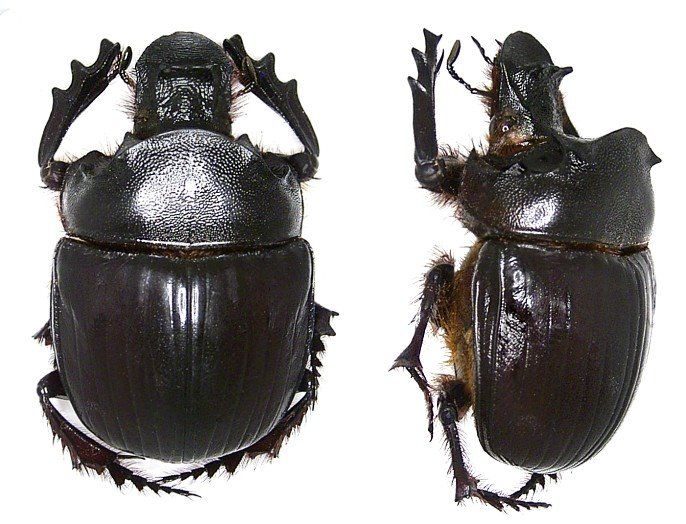
Heliocopris japetus
