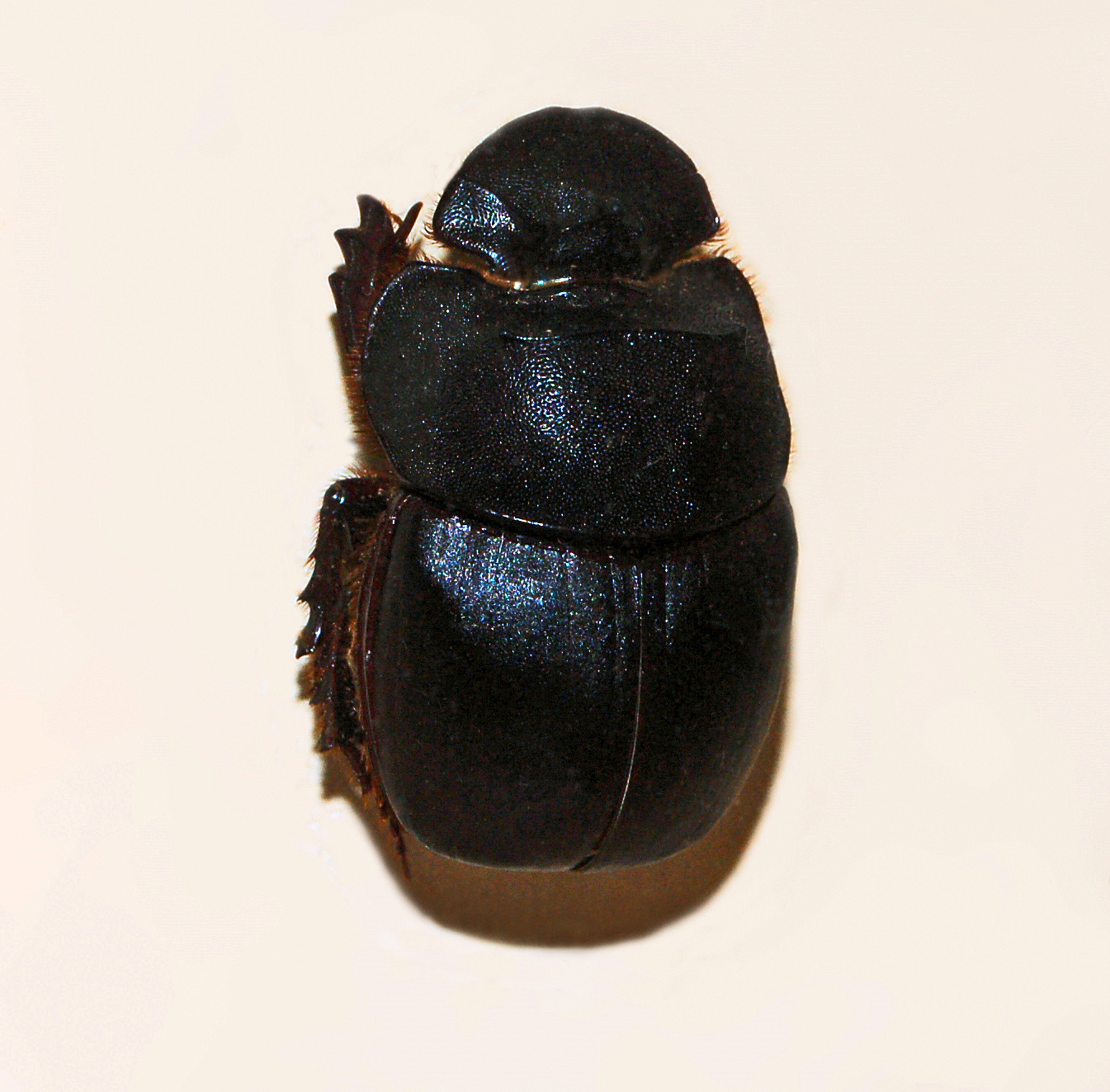
- Catharsius molossus from India

Scientific classification
- Kingdom: Animalia
- Phylum: Arthropoda
- Clade: Pancrustacea
- Class: Insecta
- Order: Coleoptera
- Suborder: Polyphaga
- Infraorder: Scarabaeiformia
- Family: Scarabaeidae
- Subfamily: Scarabaeinae
- Tribe: Coprini
- Genus: Catharsius; Hope, 1837

= Catharsius =

Genus of beetles

Catharsius is a genus of dung beetles in the tribe Coprini (subfamily Scarabaeinae) in the scarab family.

It contains about 100 species of intermediate to large size (15–50 millimetres or 0.59–1.97 inches), black or brown, living in the tropical areas of the Old World. Tropical Africa contains about 85 species, with the remaining 15 in tropical Asia. Catharsius are typically short and convex scarabs, with horns on head and forebody of males, sometimes also of females.

They mostly live in grasslands and pastures, occasionally in forests, where they eat large mammals’ dung, using it to make pedotrophic nests in which their offspring develop. A few species shifted from coprophagy to necrophagy, and use small vertebrates carcasses as food for both adults and larvae.

Due to their rather large size and occasional abundance, Catharsius species play important roles in the ecology and soil dynamics of tropical areas. They bury vast amounts of dung into the ground, thus improving the quality and texture of the soils. Also, they contribute to “clean” the surface of the ground, hence their name (from the Greek katharsios “purifier”).

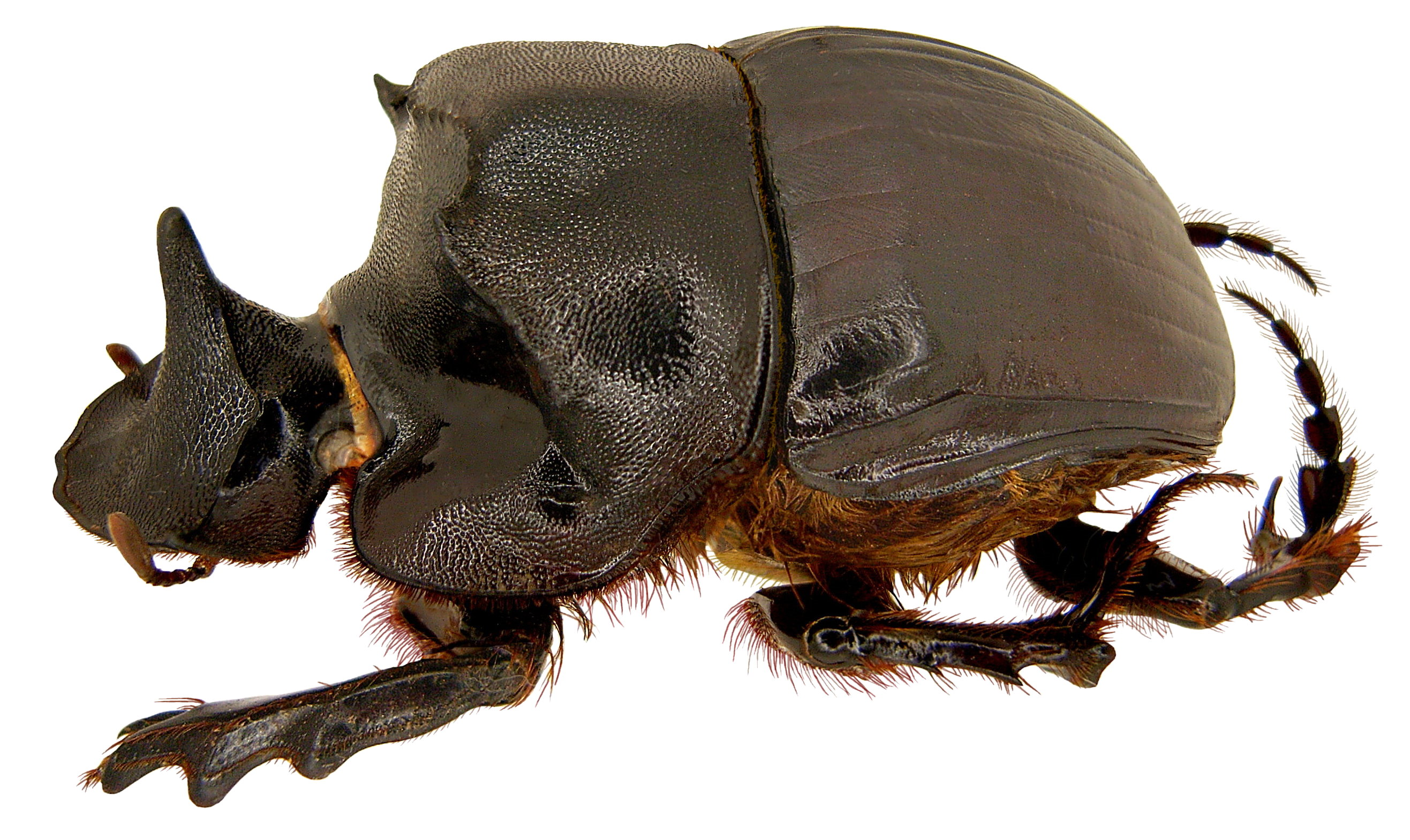
Catharsius heros

Important species are Catharsius molossus (Linnaeus, 1758), one of the most widespread and abundant coprophagous species in tropical Asian regions; C. sesostris Waterhouse, 1888, also coprophagous, widespread and common in savannas and semidesertic zones in Africa and Near East; C. eteocles Laporte, 1840, important necrophagous species in Western Africa, etc. Among less common species, C. mirabilis Felsche, 1901, occasionally abundant in Eastern Africa, displays a strong sexual dimorphism making it one of the most spectacular African dung beetles. Catharsius gorilla is a species widespread in the tropical African regions.

An additional group of some 65, much smaller (5–15 millimetres or 0.20–0.59 inches) species, mostly from tropical Africa, is sometimes erected into a separate genus: Metacatharsius Paulian, 1939.

Recently, the name “Catharsius” has been selected by a team of entomologists working on dung beetle fauna of Western Africa.

== Species ==
There are 107 recognized species:

- Catharsius achates (Olivier, 1789)
- Catharsius adamastor Gillet, 1932
- Catharsius aegeus Génier, 2017
- Catharsius aethiops Sharp, 1875
- Catharsius africanus Ferreira, 1960
- Catharsius alpheus Gillet, 1932
- Catharsius approximans Kolbe, 1893
- Catharsius balubanus Kolbe, 1893
- Catharsius belus Gillet, 1918
- Catharsius biconifer Felsche, 1907
- Catharsius bicornutus Kolbe, 1893
- Catharsius birmanensis Lansberge, 1874
- Catharsius bradshawi Lansberge, 1887
- Catharsius brevicornis Felsche, 1907
- Catharsius brittoni Ferreira, 1963
- Catharsius brutus Harold, 1880
- Catharsius calaharicus Kolbe, 1893
- Catharsius capucinus (Fabricius, 1781)
- Catharsius cassius Kolbe, 1893
- Catharsius chinai Ferreira, 1960
- Catharsius congolensis Ferreira, 1962
- Catharsius coptorhinaformis Josso & Prévost, 2009
- Catharsius crassicornis Gillet, 1911
- Catharsius dayacus Lansberge, 1886
- Catharsius dubius Péringuey, 1901
- Catharsius duciformis Ferreira, 1959
- Catharsius dux Harold, 1878
- Catharsius erechtheus Felsche, 1907
- Catharsius eteocles (Laporte, 1840)
- Catharsius fastidiosus (Thomson, 1858)
- Catharsius folicornis Josso & Prévost, 2019
- Catharsius furcillatus (Guérin-Méneville, 1847)
- Catharsius garambae Ferreira, 1962
- Catharsius genieri Moretto, 2014
- Catharsius gorilla (Thomson, 1858)
- Catharsius gorilloides Felsche, 1907
- Catharsius granulatus Sharp, 1875
- Catharsius guineensis Ferreira, 1963
- Catharsius haafi Ferreira, 1960
- Catharsius haroldi Takano, 2021
- Catharsius harpagus Ferreira, 1960
- Catharsius heros Boheman, 1860
- Catharsius hertli Ferreira, 1964
- Catharsius jacksoni Waterhouse, 1891
- Catharsius javanus Lansberge, 1886
- Catharsius juheli Josso, 2011
- Catharsius karlwerneri Moretto, 2008
- Catharsius kolbei Felsche, 1907
- Catharsius laticeps Boheman, 1857
- Catharsius latifossa Müller, 1941
- Catharsius lepineyi Boucomont, 1934
- Catharsius longiceps Gillet, 1907
- Catharsius luluensis Ferreira, 1960
- Catharsius lycaon Kolbe, 1893
- Catharsius machadoi Ferreira, 1960
- Catharsius marcellus Kolbe, 1893
- Catharsius melancholicus Boheman, 1860
- Catharsius mirabilis Felsche, 1901
- Catharsius molossus (Linnaeus, 1758)
- Catharsius morettoi Josso & Prévost, 2009
- Catharsius mulanjeensis Josso & Prévost, 2019
- Catharsius nathani Frey, 1956
- Catharsius neptunus Kolbe, 1893
- Catharsius ninus Gillet, 1918
- Catharsius oedipus Felsche, 1907
- Catharsius omoensis Müller, 1941
- Catharsius oryx Frey, 1974
- Catharsius pallas Génier, 2017
- Catharsius pandion Harold, 1877
- Catharsius phidias (Olivier, 1789)
- Catharsius philus Kolbe, 1893
- Catharsius pithecius (Fabricius, 1775)
- Catharsius platicornis Ferreira, 1960
- Catharsius platycerus (Klug, 1855)
- Catharsius platynotus Felsche, 1907
- Catharsius platypus Sharp, 1875
- Catharsius polynices Kolbe, 1893
- Catharsius pseudocongolensis Ferreira, 1963
- Catharsius pseudolycaon Ferreira, 1960
- Catharsius pseudooedipus Ferreira, 1960
- Catharsius pseudoplaticornis Josso & Prévost, 2019
- Catharsius pseudovitulus Müller, 1941
- Catharsius punctatus Josso & Prévost, 2019
- Catharsius quadridentatus Lansberge, 1885
- Catharsius renaudpauliani Ochi & Kon, 1996
- Catharsius rhinoceros (Klug, 1855)
- Catharsius saegeri Ferreira, 1962
- Catharsius sagax (Quensel, 1806)
- Catharsius satyrus Kolbe, 1893
- Catharsius scopas Felsche, 1907
- Catharsius semirubidus Fairmaire, 1891
- Catharsius sesostris Waterhouse, 1888
- Catharsius severini Gillet, 1907
- Catharsius simillimus Ferreira, 1960
- Catharsius somalicus Gillet, 1918
- Catharsius spectabilis Gillet, 1918
- Catharsius straeleni Ferreira, 1963
- Catharsius stricticornis Josso & Prévost, 2019
- Catharsius stuhlmanni Kolbe, 1893
- Catharsius takanoi Josso & Prévost, 2019
- Catharsius tricornutus (DeGeer, 1778)
- Catharsius tridens Josso & Prévost, 2009
- Catharsius ugandicus Gillet, 1918
- Catharsius ulysses Boheman, 1857
- Catharsius upembanus Ferreira, 1962
- Catharsius vansoni Ferreira, 1960
- Catharsius vitulus Boheman, 1857
