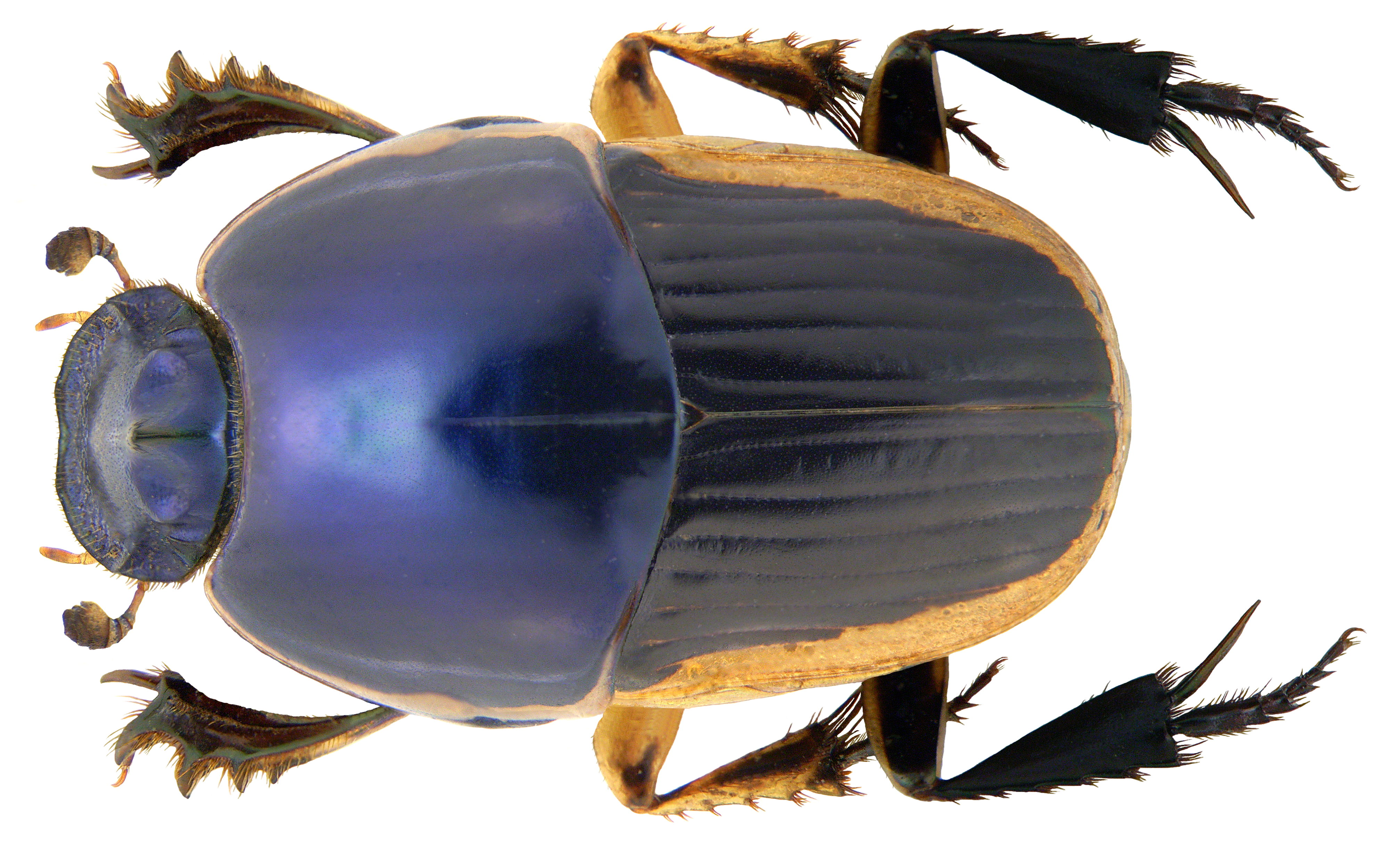
- Oniticellus egregius

Scientific classification
- Kingdom: Animalia
- Phylum: Arthropoda
- Class: Insecta
- Order: Coleoptera
- Suborder: Polyphaga
- Infraorder: Scarabaeiformia
- Family: Scarabaeidae
- Tribe: Oniticellini
- Genus: Oniticellus; Dejean, 1821

= Oniticellus =

Genus of beetles

Oniticellus is a genus of dung beetles in the subfamily Scarabaeinae of the scarab beetle family.

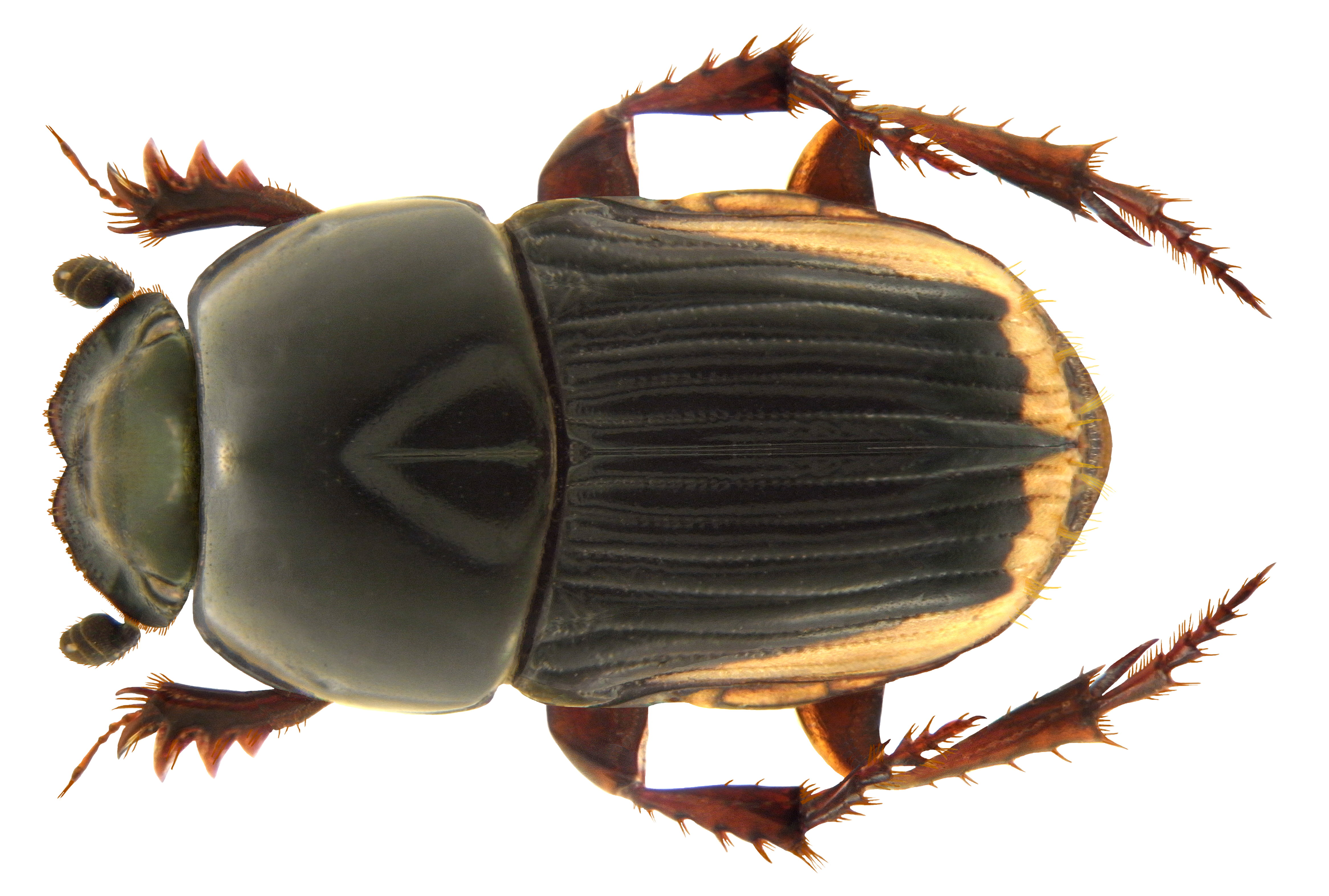
Oniticellus cinctus

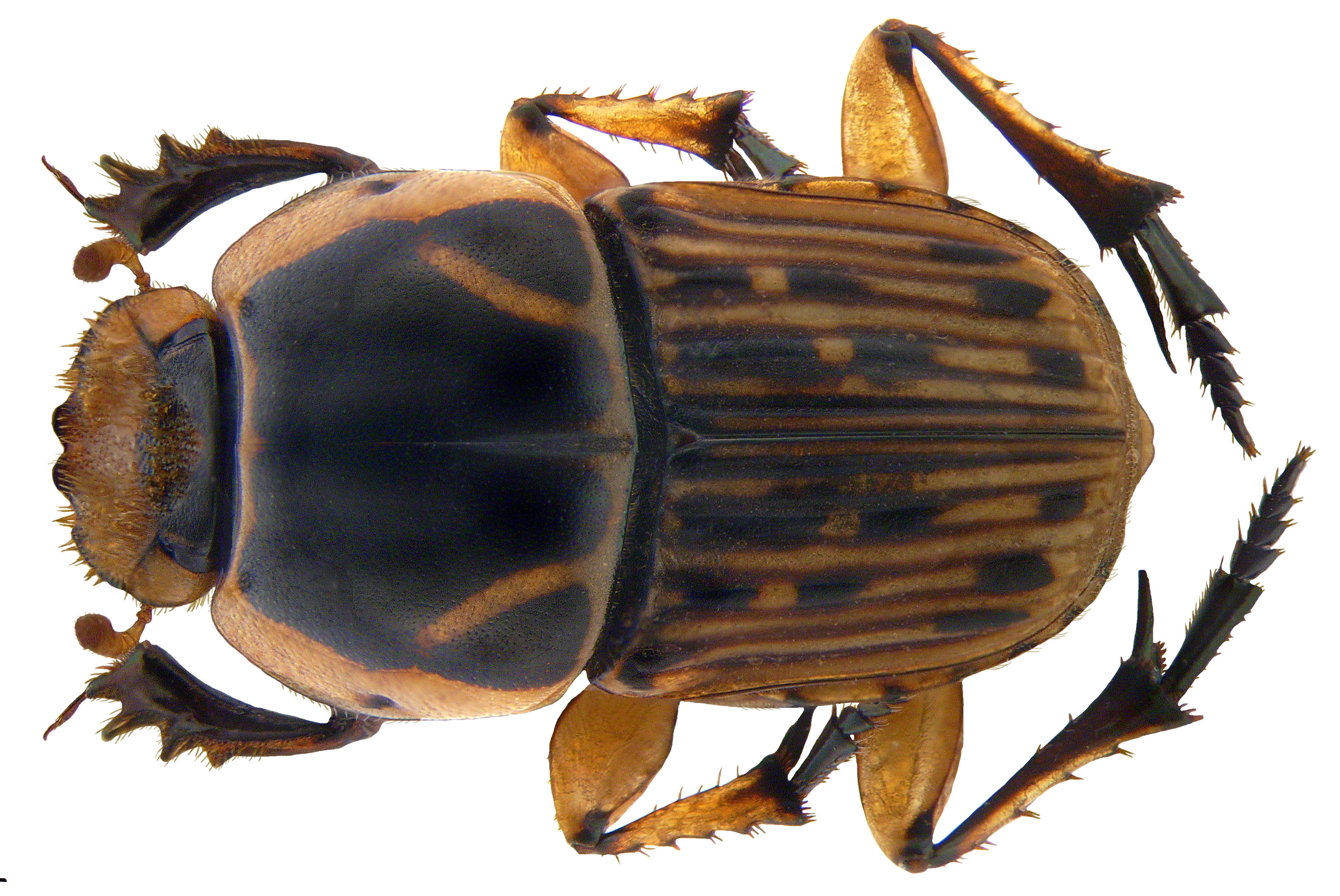
Oniticellus formosus

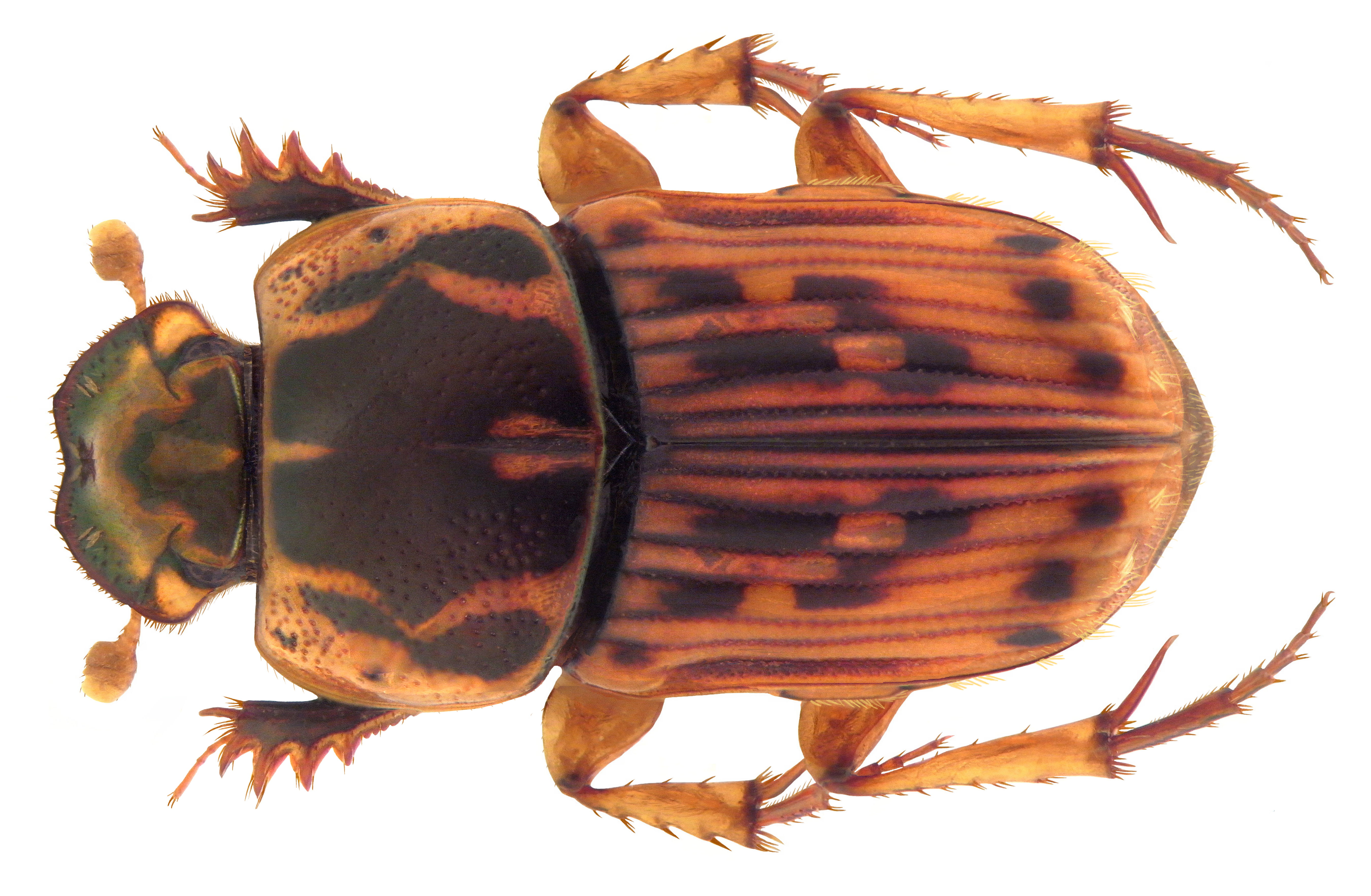
Oniticellus tesselatus
