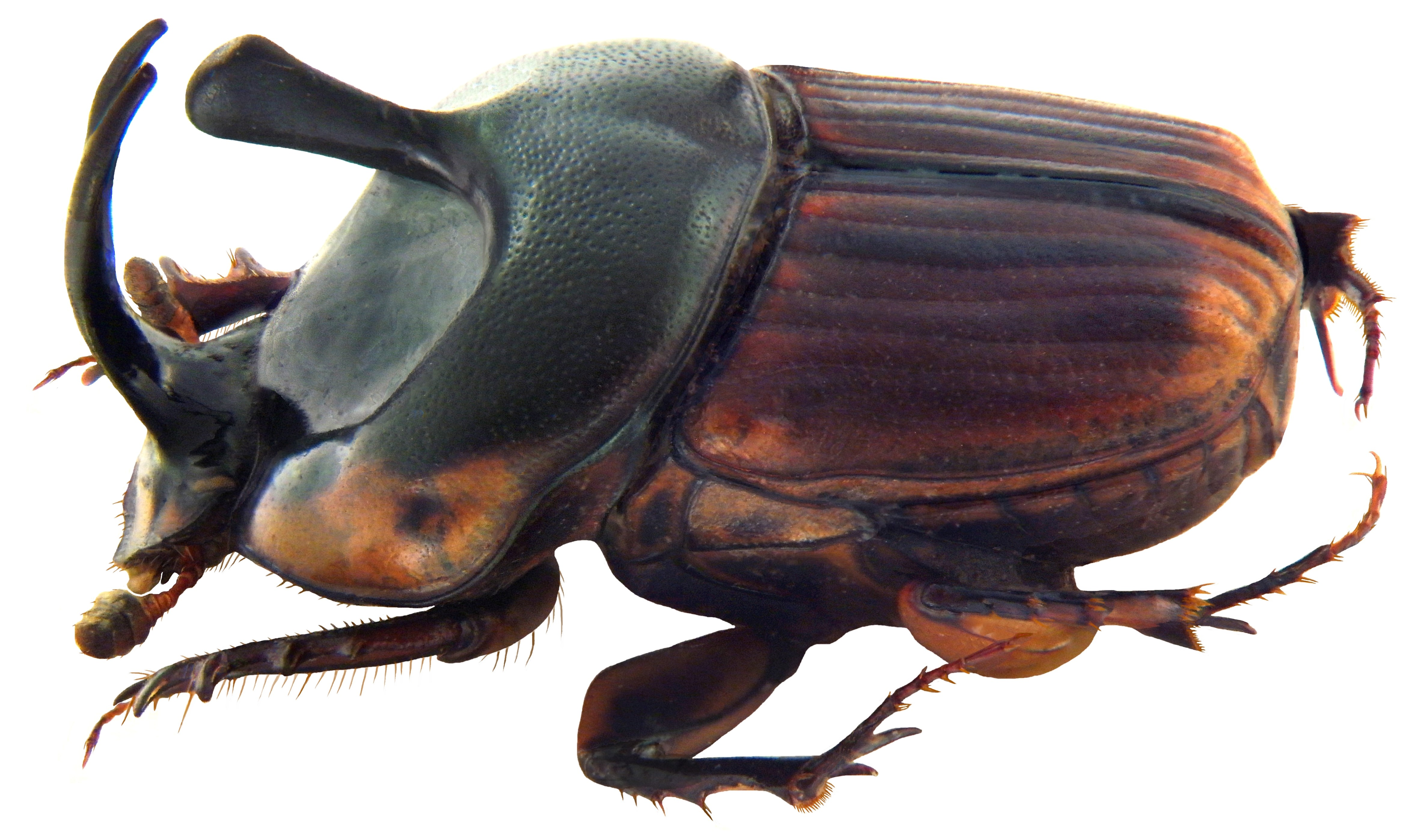
- Liatongus mergacerus

Scientific classification
- Kingdom: Animalia
- Phylum: Arthropoda
- Class: Insecta
- Order: Coleoptera
- Suborder: Polyphaga
- Infraorder: Scarabaeiformia
- Family: Scarabaeidae
- Subfamily: Scarabaeinae
- Tribe: Oniticellini d´Orbigny, 1916

Genera
- 28, see text

= Oniticellini =

Tribe of beetles

Oniticellini are a tribe of scarab beetles, in the true dung beetle subfamily (Scarabaeinae). Nearly all species of this tribe feed on and nest in dung, mainly that of large herbivores. Most are tunnelers; dung is buried at the ends of tunnels dug below a dropping, and used as food by both adults and larvae; others, known as dwellers (including Oniticellus and Tragiscus) make brood cavities within or just beneath the dung.

== Taxonomy ==
The Oniticellini have been divided into three subtribes: Drepanocerina, Helictopleurina and Oniticellina, but this arrangement is still under review.

The following genera have been placed in the Oniticellini:

- Afrodrepanus
- Anoplodrepanus
- Attavicinus
- Clypeodrepanus
- Cyptochirus
- Drepanellus
- Drepanocerus
- Drepanoplatynus
- Eodrepanus
- Epidrepanus
- Euoniticellus
- Eurysternus
- Helictopleurus
- Heterosyphus
- Ixodina
- Latodrepanus
- Liatongus
- Nitiocellus
- Oniticellus
- Paraixodina
- Paroniticellus
- Scaptocnemis
- Sinodrepanus
- Sulcodrepanus
- Tibiodrepanus
- Tiniocellus
- Tragiscus
- Yvescambefortius
