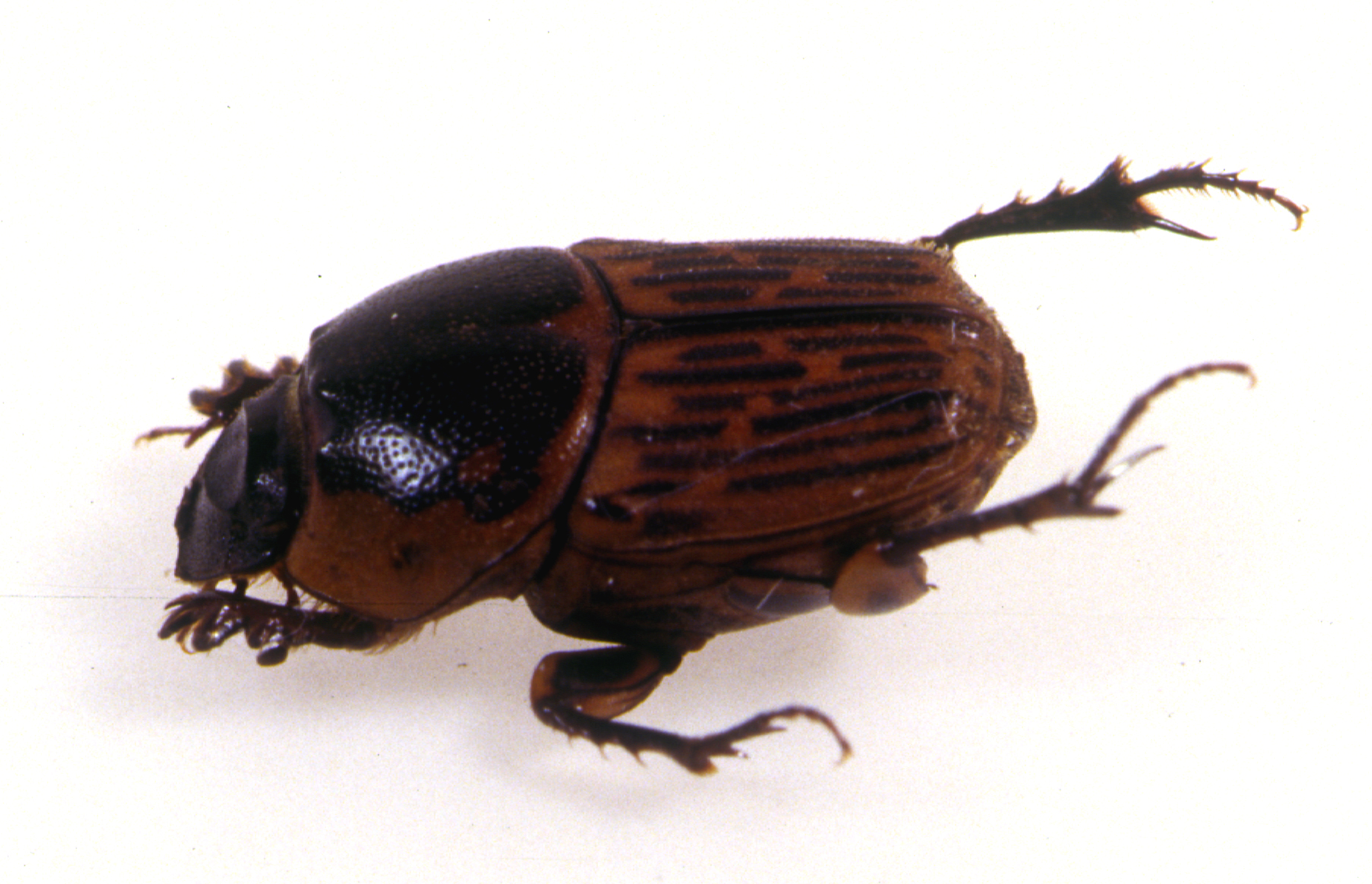
- Liatongus militaris

Scientific classification
- Kingdom: Animalia
- Phylum: Arthropoda
- Class: Insecta
- Order: Coleoptera
- Suborder: Polyphaga
- Infraorder: Scarabaeiformia
- Family: Scarabaeidae
- Tribe: Oniticellini
- Genus: Liatongus; Reitter, 1893

= Liatongus =

Genus of beetles

Liatongus is a genus of dung beetles in the subfamily Scarabaeinae of the scarab beetle family. At least part of the upper surfaces are without hairs; the head and pronotal disc are generally sculptured; and the genae are rounded, with little or no indentation between the clypeus and the genae. Length ranges from 7.4 to 10.9 mm. Colours vary: they may be uniform brown or dull purple, or have red, white or yellow patterns on the elytra.

== Distribution ==
Found in three regions: Afrotropical, Oriental to eastern Palearctic, and western Nearctic.

== Taxonomy ==
There are 38-46 species; 17 are from Africa.

== Gallery ==
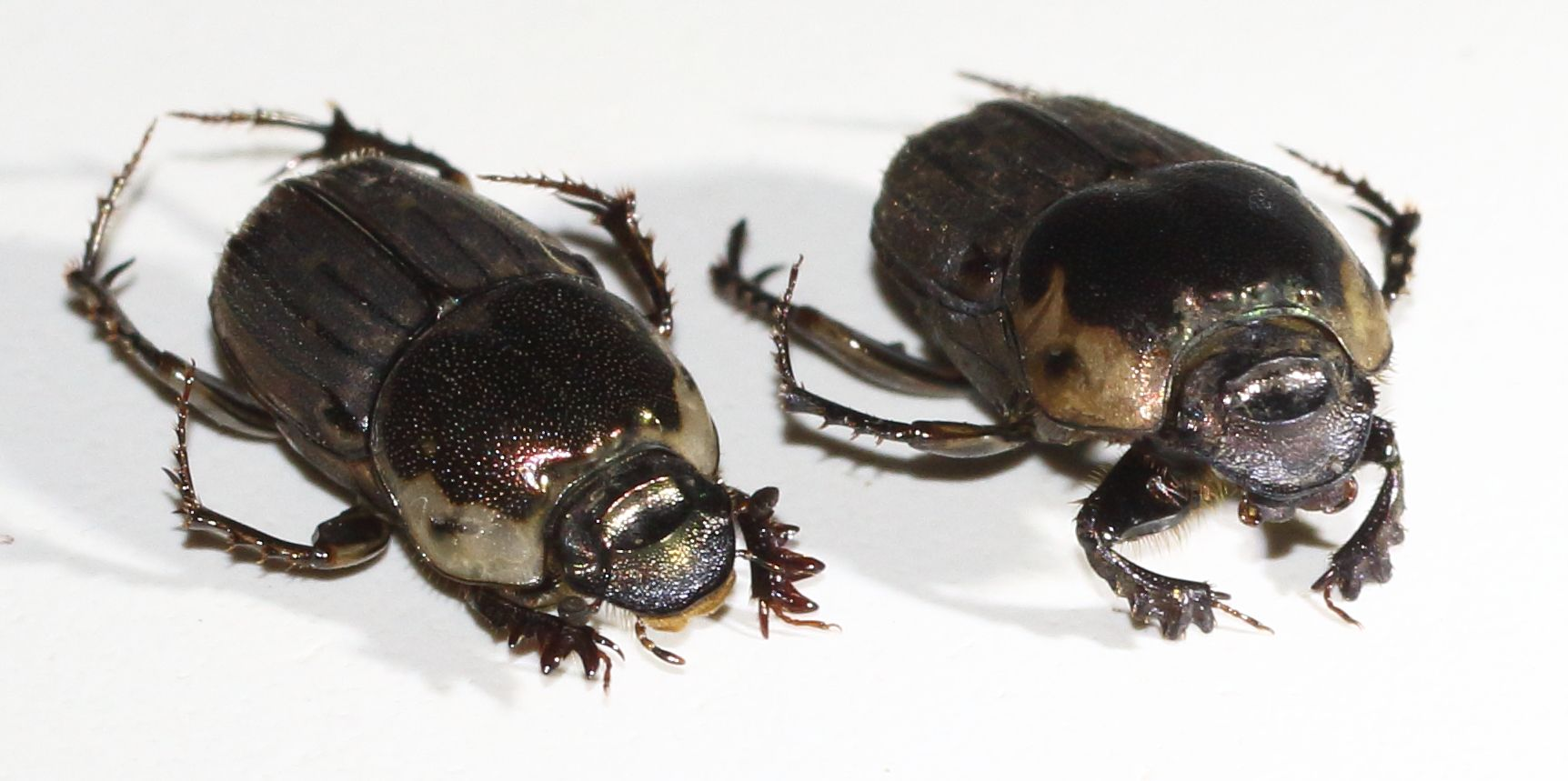
Liatongus militaris

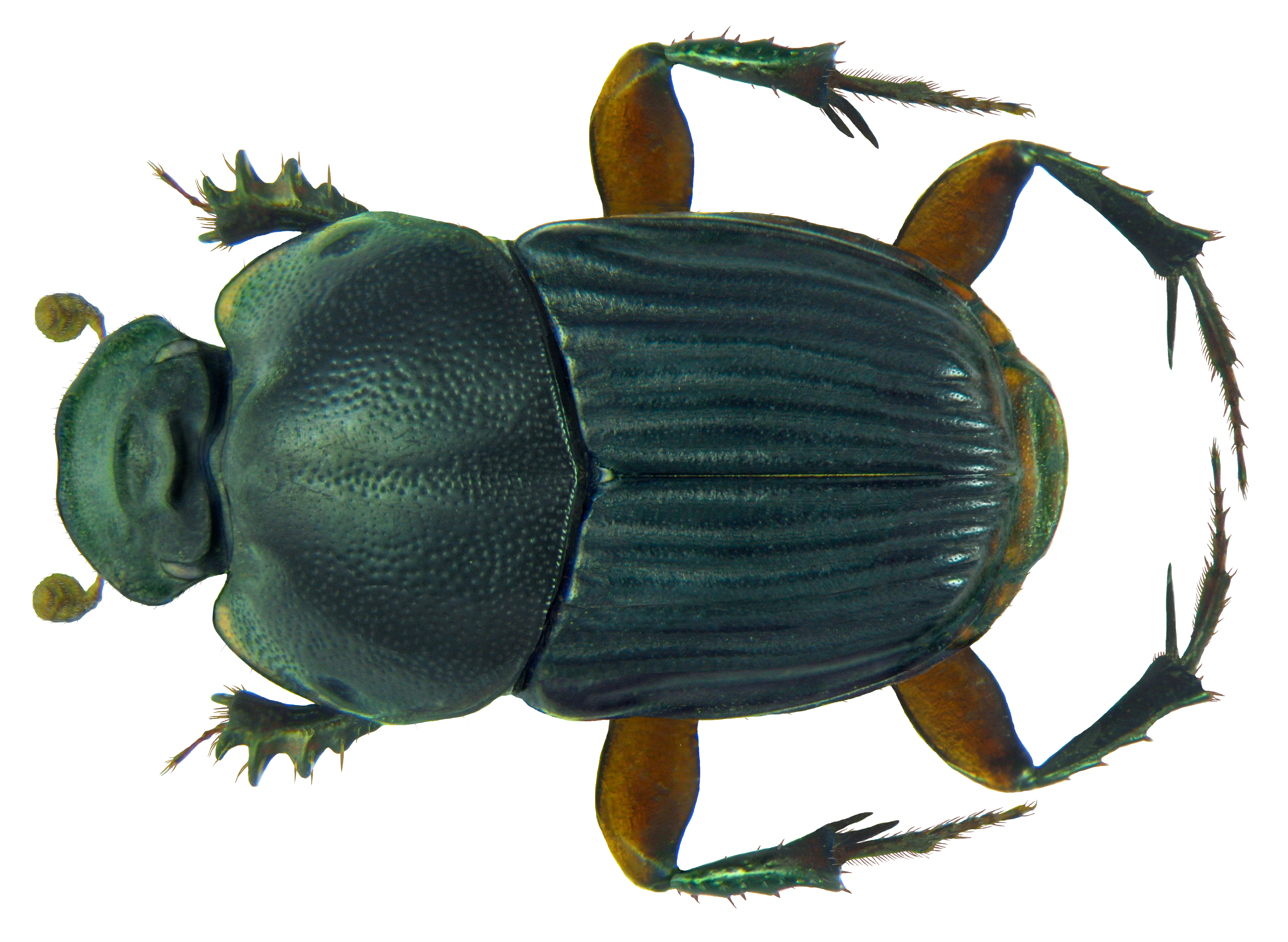
Liatongus femoratus

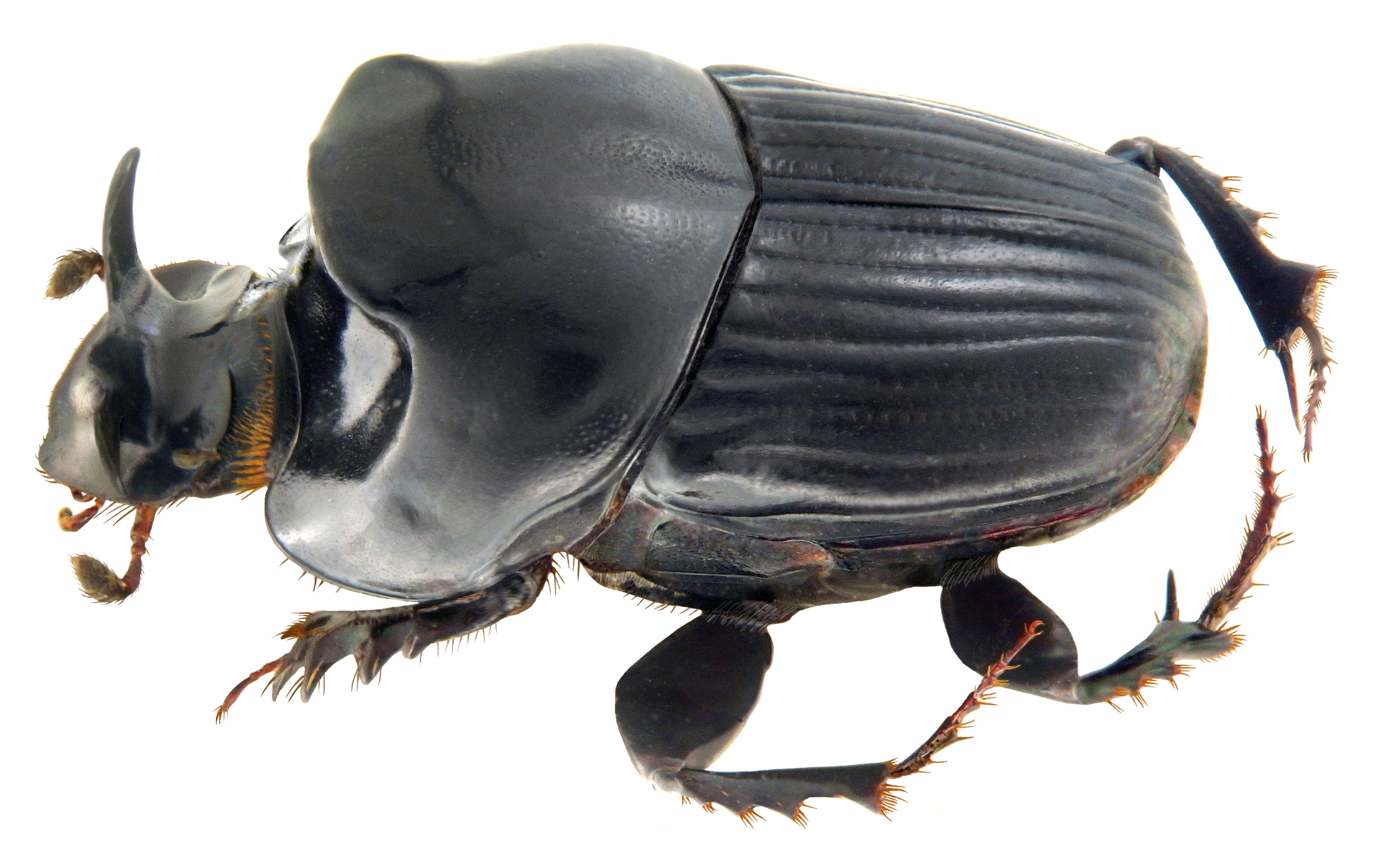
Liatongus gagatinus

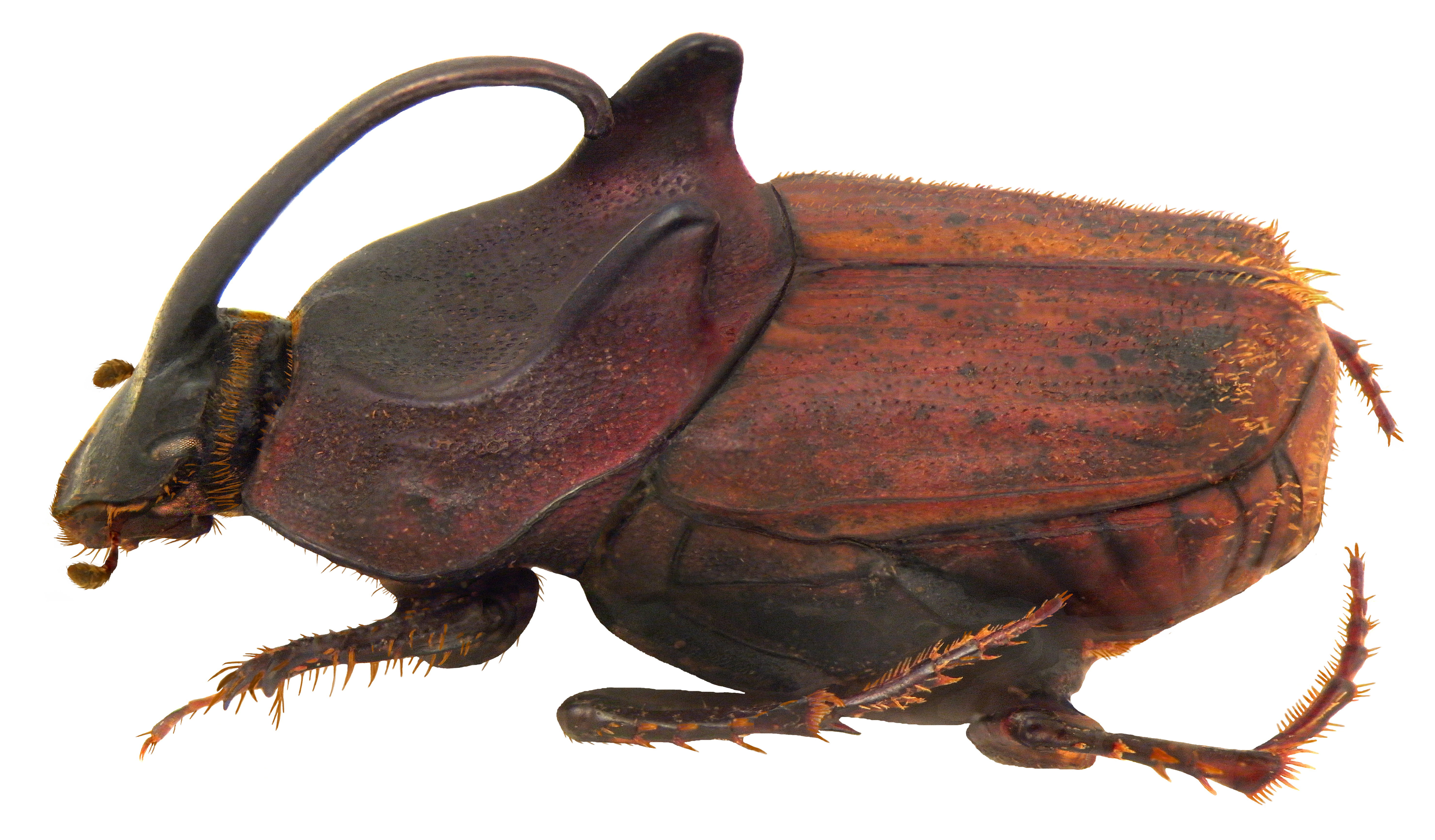
Liatongus incurvicornis

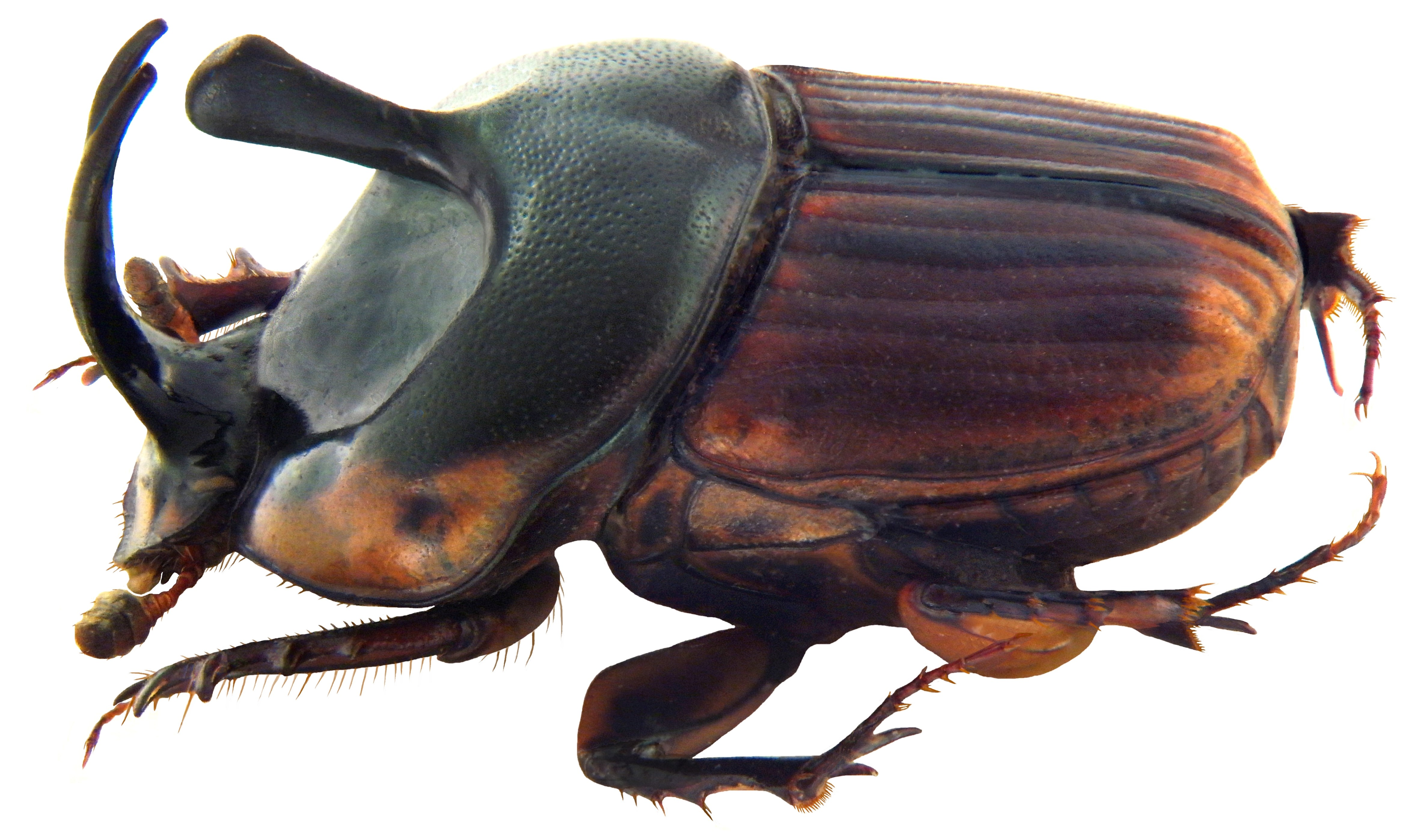
Liatongus mergacerus

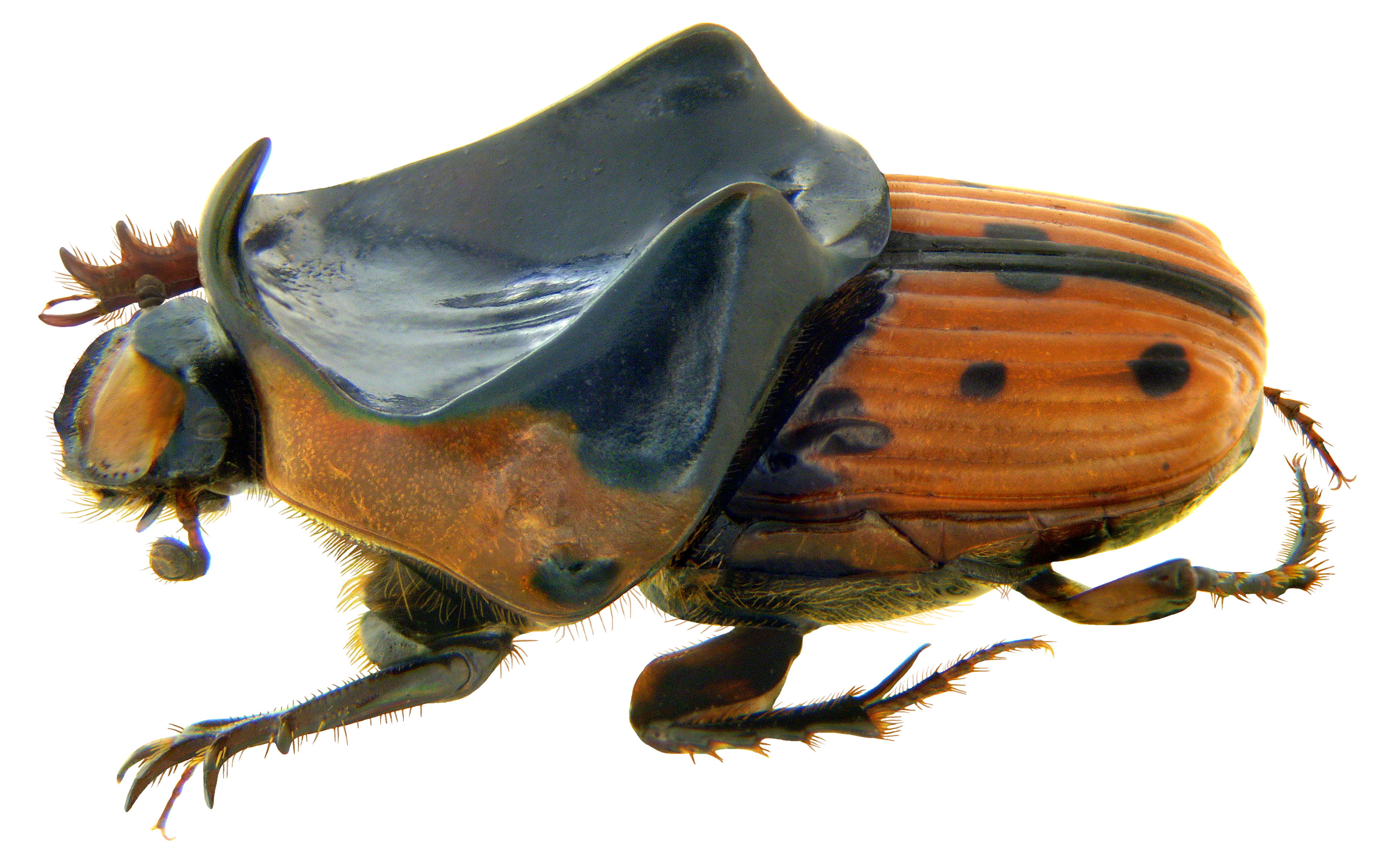
Liatongus rhadamistus

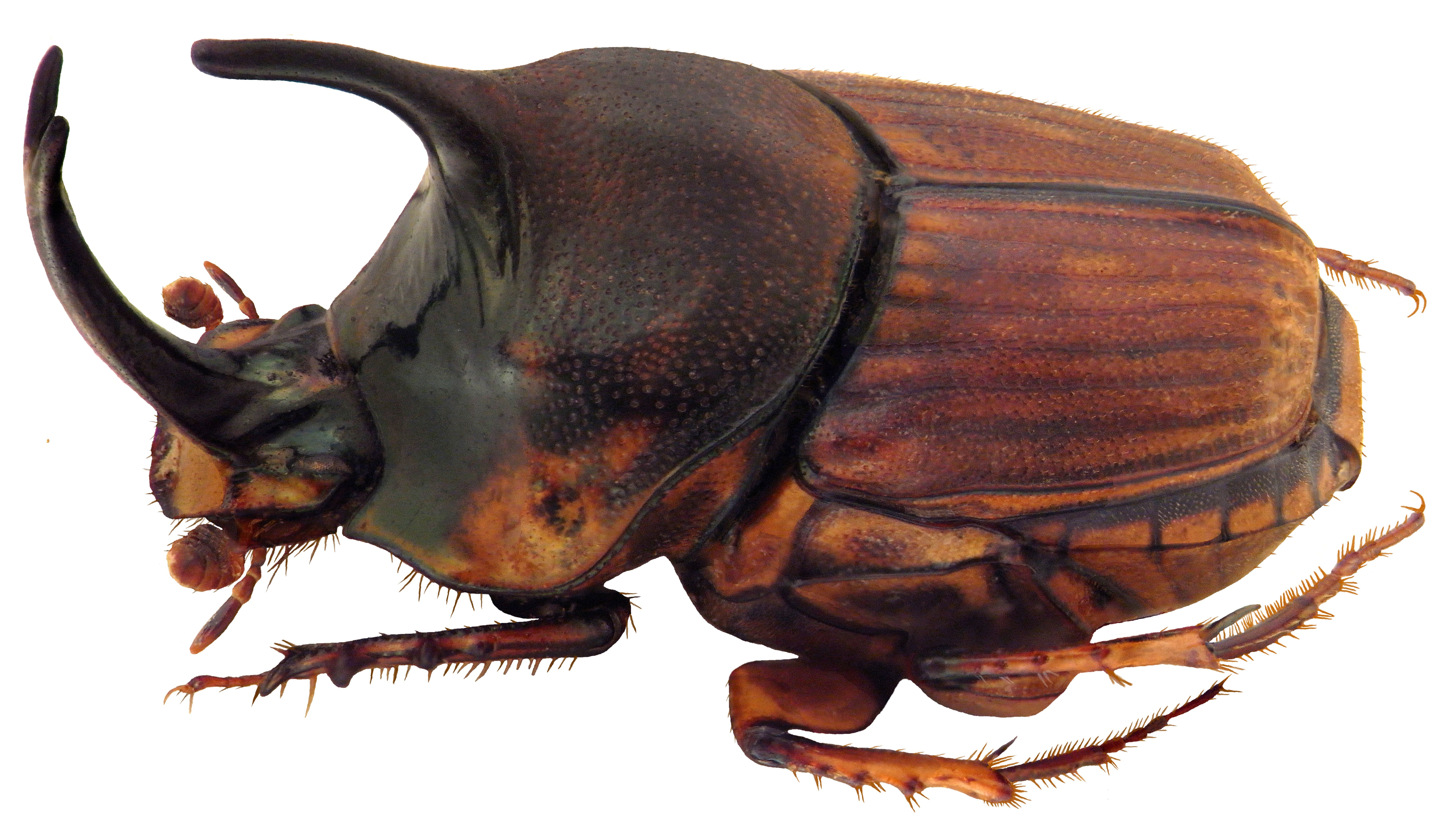
Liatongus venator

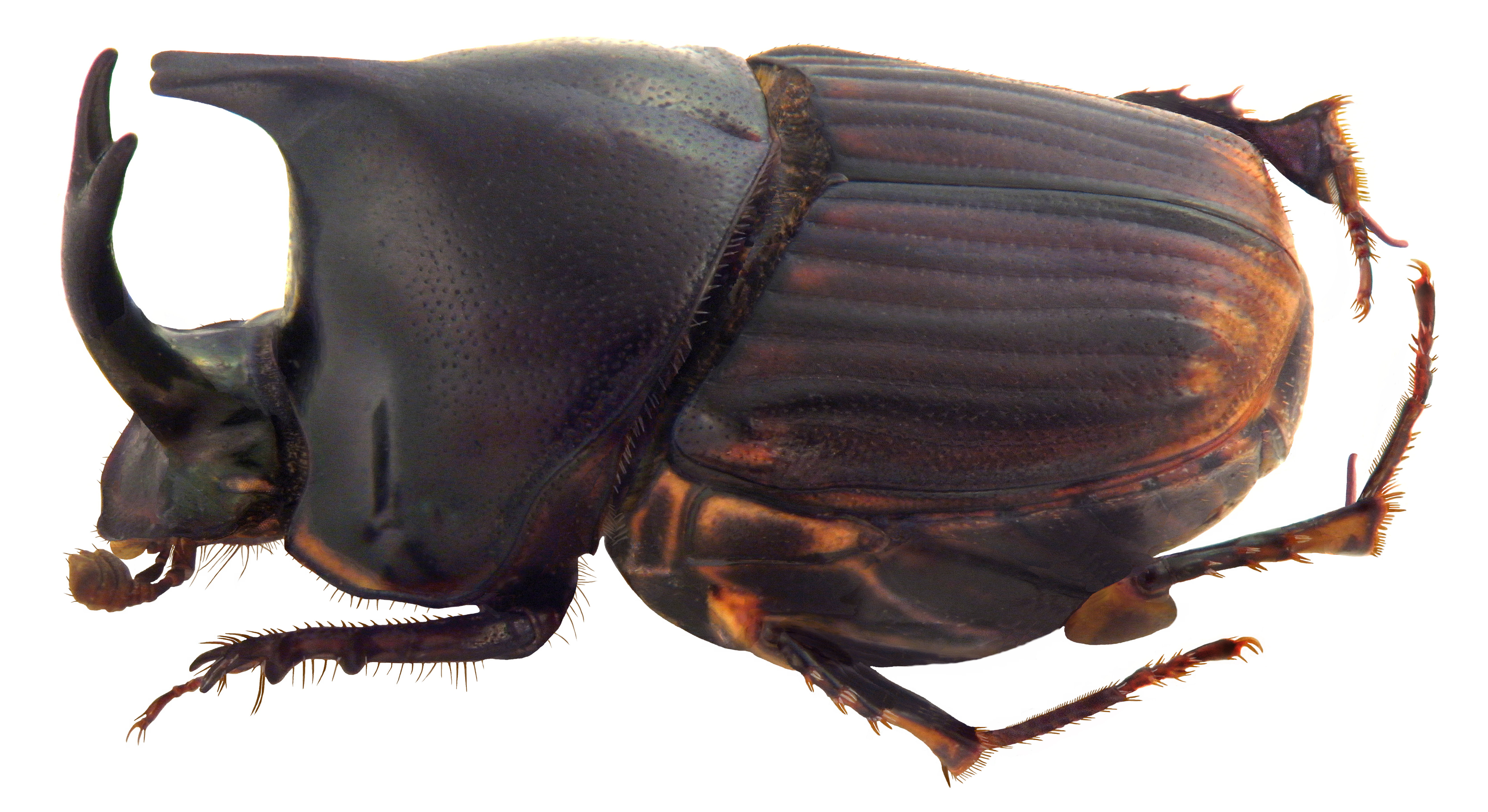
Liatongus vertagus

== Species ==
These 43 species belong to the genus Liatongus:

- Liatongus affinis (Arrow, 1908)^{c g}
- Liatongus amitinus (Boucomont, 1921)^{c g}
- Liatongus ancorifer Kral & Rejsek, 1999^{c g}
- Liatongus appositicornis Kral & Rejsek, 1999^{c g}
- Liatongus arrowi (Boucomont, 1921)^{c g}
- Liatongus aterrimus (Boucomont, 1921)^{c g}
- Liatongus bucerus (Fairmaire, 1891)^{c g}
- Liatongus californicus (Horn, 1882)^{i c g b}
- Liatongus clypeocornis Scheuern, 1988^{c g}
- Liatongus davidi (Boucomont, 1919)^{c g}
- Liatongus denticornis (Fairmaire, 1887)^{c g}
- Liatongus endroedii Balthasar, 1956^{c g}
- Liatongus femoratus (Illiger, 1800)^{c g}
- Liatongus ferreirae Balthasar, 1964^{c g}
- Liatongus fulvostriatus D'Orbigny, 1916^{c g}
- Liatongus gagatinus (Hope, 1831)^{c g}
- Liatongus hastatus Kral & Rejsek, 1999^{c g}
- Liatongus imitator Balthasar, 1938^{c g}
- Liatongus incurvicornis (Fairmaire, 1887)^{c g}
- Liatongus indicus (Arrow, 1908)^{c}
- Liatongus interruptus (Quedenfeldt, 1884)^{c g}
- Liatongus martialis (Harold, 1879)^{c g}
- Liatongus medius (Fairmaire, 1889)^{c g}
- Liatongus mergacerus (Hope, 1831)^{c g}
- Liatongus militaris (Castelnau, 1840)^{c g}
- Liatongus minutus (Motschulsky, 1860)^{c}
- Liatongus phanaeoides (Westwood, 1839)^{c g}
- Liatongus pugionatus (Boheman, 1858)^{c g}
- Liatongus raffrayi (Lansberge, 1886)^{c g}
- Liatongus rhinoceros Arrow, 1931^{c g}
- Liatongus rhinocerulus (Bates, 1889)^{c g}
- Liatongus schoutedeni (Boucomont, 1920)^{c}
- Liatongus sjostedti (Felsche, 1904)^{c g}
- Liatongus spathulatus (Roth, 1851)^{c g}
- Liatongus taurus (Boucomont, 1920)^{c g}
- Liatongus testudo (Lansberge, 1886)^{c g}
- Liatongus triacanthus (Boucomont, 1920)^{c g}
- Liatongus tridentatus (Boucomont, 1919)^{c g}
- Liatongus tuberculicollis (Felsche, 1909)^{c g}
- Liatongus upembanus Janssens, 1953^{c g}
- Liatongus urus (Kolbe, 1914)^{c g}
- Liatongus venator (Fabricius, 1801)^{c g}
- Liatongus vertagus (Fabricius, 1798)^{c g}

Data sources: i = ITIS, c = Catalogue of Life, g = GBIF, b = Bugguide.net
