= Tibiodrepanus setosus =

Scientific classification
- Kingdom: Animalia
- Phylum: Arthropoda
- Class: Insecta
- Order: Coleoptera
- Suborder: Polyphaga
- Infraorder: Scarabaeiformia
- Family: Scarabaeidae
- Genus: Tibiodrepanus
- Species: T. setosus

Binomial name
- Tibiodrepanus setosus (Wiedemann, 1823)

Synonyms
- Copris setosus Wiedemann, 1823; Ixodina setosa (Wiedemann, 1823); Drepanocerus setosus (Wiedemann, 1823); Drepanocerus setosus Balthasar, 1963; Tibiodrepanus setosus Haroldius, 2009

Species of beetle

Tibiodrepanus setosus, is a species of dung beetle found in many South Asian and South East Asian countries including: Pakistan, India, Bhutan, Nepal, Sri Lanka, China, Myanmar, Laos, Thailand, Vietnam, Philippines and Indonesia.

== Description ==
This elongate-oval, little depressed species has an average length of about 4.5 to 5.5 mm. Body black with reddish antennae and tarsi. Body covered with grey or dirty yellow setae. Head narrow, unevenly and unequally punctured. Head shiny and deeply punctate. Clypeus bidentate and deeply impressed between the teeth. Pronotum very closely covered with large shallow pits. Elytra opaque, broadly and shallowly striate. Pygidium opaque and setose. Metasternal disc flat. Male has a pronotum with a small anterior lateral depression on each side as well as a large posterior depression. But female has a pronotum with a large median posterior depression.

Adults are observed from elephant and gaur dung.
