= Tibiodrepanus =

Scientific classification
- Kingdom: Animalia
- Phylum: Arthropoda
- Class: Insecta
- Order: Coleoptera
- Suborder: Polyphaga
- Infraorder: Scarabaeiformia
- Family: Scarabaeidae
- Tribe: Oniticellini
- Genus: Tibiodrepanus; Krikken, 2009

Species
- see text

Synonyms
- Sulcodrepanus Krikken, 2009

Genus of beetles

Tibiodrepanus is a genus of dung beetles comprising seven species distributed in Oriental and Palaearctic countries.

== Species ==
- Tibiodrepanus hircus (Wiedemann, 1823)
- Tibiodrepanus kazirangensis (Biswas, 1980)
- Tibiodrepanus setosus (Wiedemann, 1823)
- Tibiodrepanus simplex (Kabakov, 2006)
- Tibiodrepanus sinicus (Harold, 1868)
- Tibiodrepanus sulcicollis (Castelnau, 1840)
- Tibiodrepanus tagliaferrii Barbero, Palestrini & Roggero, 2011
