= Liatongus californicus =

Scientific classification
- Domain: Eukaryota
- Kingdom: Animalia
- Phylum: Arthropoda
- Class: Insecta
- Order: Coleoptera
- Suborder: Polyphaga
- Infraorder: Scarabaeiformia
- Family: Scarabaeidae
- Genus: Liatongus
- Species: L. californicus

Binomial name
- Liatongus californicus (Horn, 1882)

Species of beetle

Liatongus californicus is a species of dung beetle in the family Scarabaeidae.
