= Agamopus unguicularis =

Scientific classification
- Kingdom: Animalia
- Phylum: Arthropoda
- Clade: Pancrustacea
- Class: Insecta
- Order: Coleoptera
- Suborder: Polyphaga
- Infraorder: Scarabaeiformia
- Family: Scarabaeidae
- Genus: Agamopus
- Species: A. unguicularis

Binomial name
- Agamopus unguicularis (Harold, 1883)

Synonyms
- Canthon unguicularis Harold, 1883; Agamopus martinezi Pereira, 1947

Species of beetle

Agamopus unguicularis is a species of beetle of the family Scarabaeidae. It is found in Bolivia and Brazil (Bahia, Distrito Federal, Mato Grosso, Minas Gerais, Paraná, Piauí, Santa Catarina, São Paulo).

== Description ==
They are similar to Agamopus viridis and Agamopus joker, by the absence of small tubercles on the head, which are present in other species of the genus. In its brown colour, unguicularis is more similar to Agamopus lampros and Agamopus castaneus, but can be easily separated from lampros by the head fully covered by micropunctation, and from castaneus by a presence of a row of several yellow setae along the anterior edge of the sulcus.
