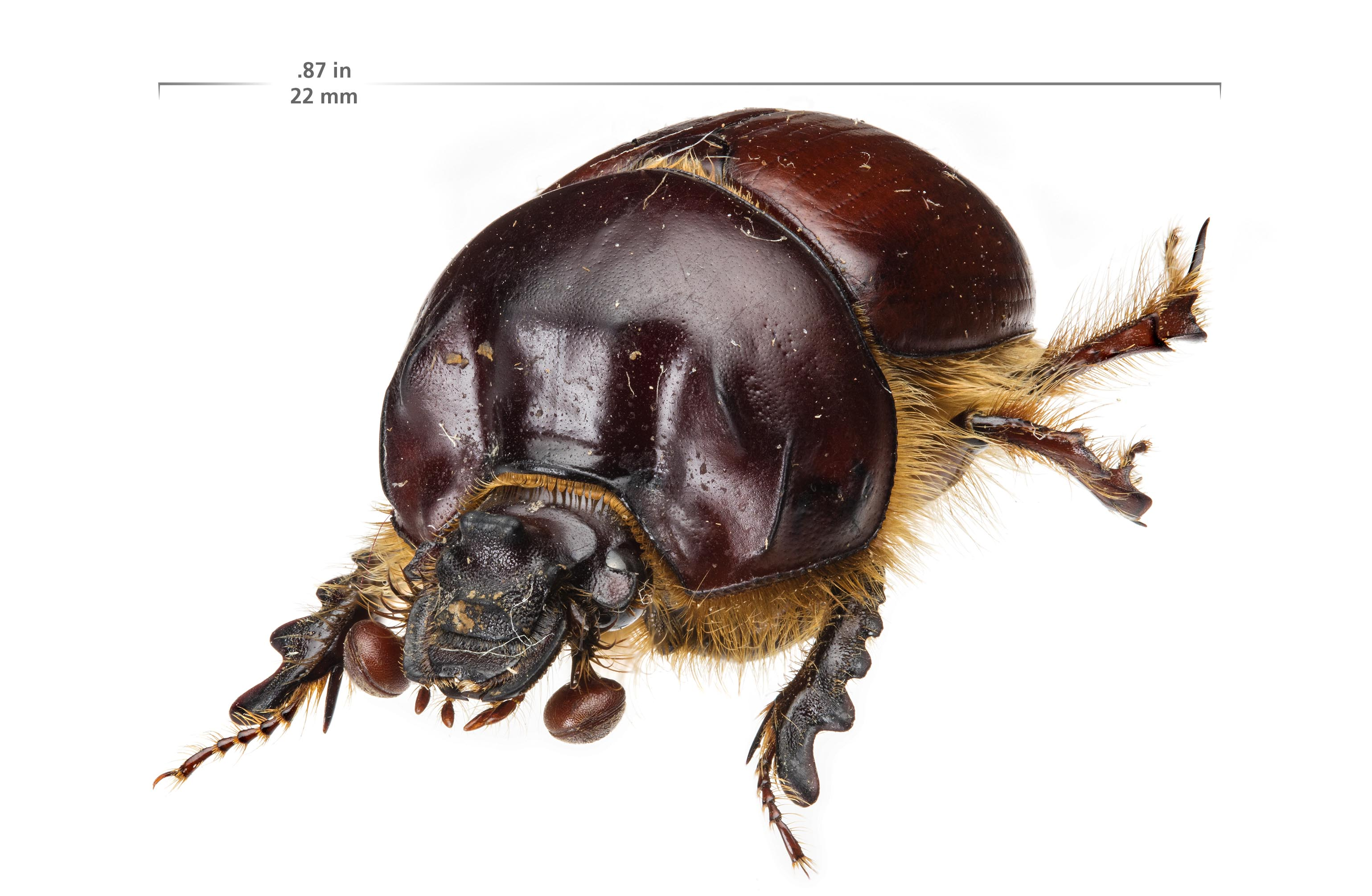
- Not an Ateuchus- not even the right family. This is Bolboceratidae

Scientific classification
- Kingdom: Animalia
- Phylum: Arthropoda
- Clade: Pancrustacea
- Class: Insecta
- Order: Coleoptera
- Suborder: Polyphaga
- Infraorder: Scarabaeiformia
- Family: Scarabaeidae
- Subfamily: Scarabaeinae
- Tribe: Ateuchini; Perty, 1830

= Ateuchini =

Tribe of beetles

Ateuchini is a tribe of dung beetles in the family Scarabaeidae. There are at least 30 genera and 370 described species in Ateuchini.

== Genera ==
These 30 genera belong to the tribe Ateuchini:

- Agamopus Bates, 1887
- Aphengium Harold, 1868
- Ateuchus Weber, 1801
- Bdelyropsis Pereira, Vulcano & Martínez, 1960
- Bdelyrus Harold, 1869
- Besourenga Vaz-de-Mello, 2008
- Bradypodidium Vaz-de-Mello, 2008
- Degallieridium Vaz-de-Mello, 2008
- Deltorhinum Harold, 1867
- Demarziella Balthasar, 1961
- Eutrichillum Martínez, 1969
- Feeridium Vaz de Mello, 2008
- Genieridium Vaz-de-Mello, 2008
- Haroldius Boucomont, 1914
- Leotrichillum Vaz-de-Mello, 2008
- Martinezidium Vaz-de-Mello, 2008
- Nunoidium Vaz-de-Mello, 2008
- Onoreidium Vaz-de-Mello, 2008
- Onychothecus Boucomont, 1912
- Paraphytus Harold, 1877
- Pedaria Laporte, 1832
- Pedaridium Harold, 1868
- Pereiraidium Vaz-de-Mello, 2008
- Pleronyx van Lansberge, 1874
- Pseuduroxys Balthasar, 1938
- Scatimus Erichson, 1847
- Scatrichus Génier & Kohlmann, 2003
- Silvinha Vaz-de-Mello, 2008
- Sinapisoma Boucomont, 1928
- Trichillidium Vaz-de-Mello, 2008
- Trichillum Harold, 1868
- Uroxys Westwood, 1842
