= Delopleurus =

Scientific classification
- Kingdom: Animalia
- Phylum: Arthropoda
- Class: Insecta
- Order: Coleoptera
- Suborder: Polyphaga
- Infraorder: Scarabaeiformia
- Family: Scarabaeidae
- Subfamily: Scarabaeinae
- Tribe: Ateuchini
- Genus: Delopleurus; Erichson, 1847

Synonyms
- Delophorus Lacordaire, 1856

Genus of beetles

Delopleurus is a genus of dung beetles in the family Scarabaeidae. There are about 10 described species in Delopleurus, found in Africa and Asia.

== Species ==
These 10 species belong to the genus Delopleurus:

- Delopleurus darrenmanni Frolov, 2014 (Botswana, Namibia, Zambia)
- Delopleurus fossatus Frolov, 2014 (Malawi)
- Delopleurus gilletti Janssens, 1939 (Afrotropics)
- Delopleurus krikkeni Frolov, 2014 (Kenya, Tanzania)
- Delopleurus mencli Král, 2014 (Yemen)
- Delopleurus naviauxi Frolov & Cambefort, 2014 (Kenya, Tanzania)
- Delopleurus parvus (Sharp, 1875) (India, Sri Lanka, Nepal)
- Delopleurus pubescens Frolov, 2014 (Democratic Republic of the Congo, Zimbabwe)
- Delopleurus pullus Boheman, 1857 (Afrotropics)
- Delopleurus striatus Arrow, 1931 (India)
