= Delopleurus parvus =

Scientific classification
- Kingdom: Animalia
- Phylum: Arthropoda
- Class: Insecta
- Order: Coleoptera
- Suborder: Polyphaga
- Infraorder: Scarabaeiformia
- Family: Scarabaeidae
- Subfamily: Scarabaeinae
- Tribe: Ateuchini
- Genus: Delopleurus
- Species: D. parvus

Binomial name
- Delopleurus parvus (Sharp, 1875)

Synonyms
- Coptorhina parvus Sharp, 1875; Delopleurus cardoni Paulian, 1934

Species of beetle

Delopleurus parvus, is a species of dung beetle found in India, Sri Lanka and Nepal.

== Description ==
This small subquadrate, highly convex species has an average length of about 5 to 6 mm.

The species has found in habitats such as under a puffball fungus.
