= Ateuchus texanus =

Scientific classification
- Domain: Eukaryota
- Kingdom: Animalia
- Phylum: Arthropoda
- Class: Insecta
- Order: Coleoptera
- Suborder: Polyphaga
- Infraorder: Scarabaeiformia
- Family: Scarabaeidae
- Genus: Ateuchus
- Species: A. texanus

Binomial name
- Ateuchus texanus (Robinson, 1948)

Species of beetle

Ateuchus texanus is a species of dung beetle in the family Scarabaeidae.
