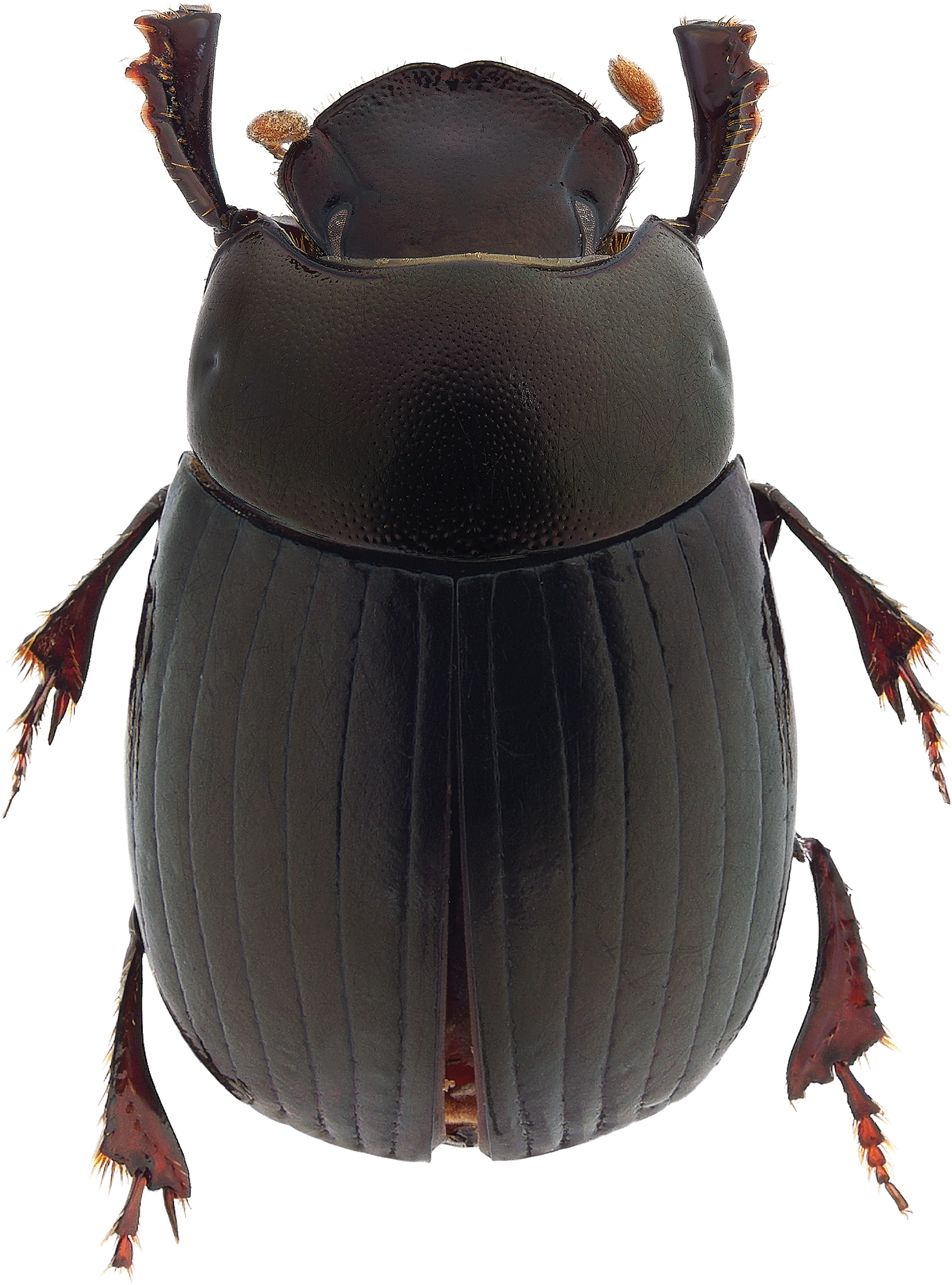

Conservation status
- Least Concern (IUCN 3.1)

Scientific classification
- Domain: Eukaryota
- Kingdom: Animalia
- Phylum: Arthropoda
- Class: Insecta
- Order: Coleoptera
- Suborder: Polyphaga
- Infraorder: Scarabaeiformia
- Family: Scarabaeidae
- Genus: Ateuchus
- Species: A. guatemalensis

Binomial name
- Ateuchus guatemalensis (Bates, 1887)

Synonyms
- Ateuchus benitojuarezi Moctezuma, Halffter, Sánchez-Huerta, 2018

= Ateuchus guatemalensis =

Species of beetle

Ateuchus guatemalensis, is a species of dung beetle belonging to the family Scarabaeidae. It is found in Guatemala, Honduras, Nicaragua, and the Mexican states Chiapas and Oaxaca.

== Description ==
These beetles show slight sexual dimorphism. The male is about 7.9mm in length, with an elongate-oval and convex body, glossy black beetle with reddish to greenish sheen. The female is similar, but has a less convex pygidium and more acute clypeal teeth.
