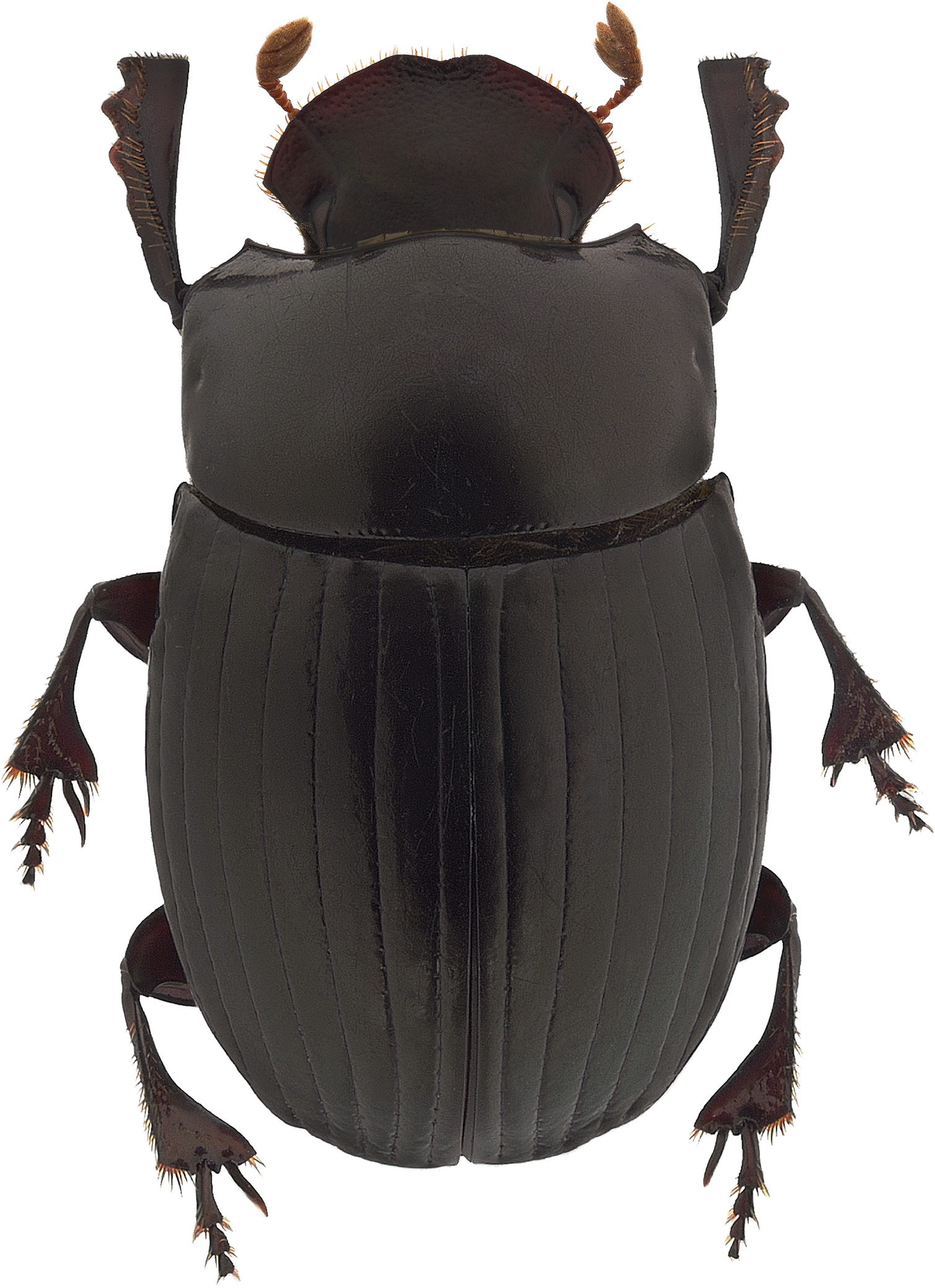

Scientific classification
- Kingdom: Animalia
- Phylum: Arthropoda
- Clade: Pancrustacea
- Class: Insecta
- Order: Coleoptera
- Suborder: Polyphaga
- Infraorder: Scarabaeiformia
- Family: Scarabaeidae
- Genus: Ateuchus
- Species: A. colossus

Binomial name
- Ateuchus colossus Moctezuma, Halffter, Sánchez-Huerta, 2018

= Ateuchus colossus =

Species of beetle

Ateuchus colossus, is a species of dung beetle belonging to the family Scarabaeidae. It is found from three locations of the region of Los Chimalapas, Mexico.

It is categorized by its shiny black hue and distinct orangish mandibles.

== Etymology ==
The scientific name colossus, meaning huge, where it is the largest known Ateuchus species in North America up to date.

== Description ==
Show slight sexual dimorphism. Male is about 10.7mm in length. Body elongate-oval and convex. A glossy black beetle with metallic sheen. Female is similar, but has a less convex pygidium and coarsely punctate head when comparing male.
