= Ateuchus convexus =

Scientific classification
- Kingdom: Animalia
- Phylum: Arthropoda
- Clade: Pancrustacea
- Class: Insecta
- Order: Coleoptera
- Suborder: Polyphaga
- Infraorder: Scarabaeiformia
- Family: Scarabaeidae
- Genus: Ateuchus
- Species: A. convexus

Binomial name
- Ateuchus convexus (Balthasar, 1965)

Synonyms
- Agamopus convexus Balthasar, 1965

Species of beetle

Ateuchus convexus is a species of beetle of the family Scarabaeidae. It is found in Brazil (Espírito Santo).
