= Uroxys =

- Uroxys corporaali

Scientific classification
- Kingdom: Animalia
- Phylum: Arthropoda
- Clade: Pancrustacea
- Class: Insecta
- Order: Coleoptera
- Suborder: Polyphaga
- Infraorder: Scarabaeiformia
- Family: Scarabaeidae
- Subfamily: Scarabaeinae
- Tribe: Ateuchini
- Genus: Uroxys; Westwood, 1842

Synonyms
- Pseuduroxys Balthasar, 1938

Genus of beetles

Uroxys is a genus of beetles of the family Scarabaeidae.

== Species ==
- Uroxys angulatus Harold, 1868
- Uroxys angulicollis (Boheman, 1858)
- Uroxys aphanes Huchet, 2026
- Uroxys aterrimus Harold, 1867
- Uroxys bahianus Boucomont, 1928
- Uroxys batesi Harold, 1868
- Uroxys besti Ratcliffe, 1980
- Uroxys boneti Pereira & Halffter, 1961
- Uroxys bonplandi Kohlmann, Solis & Alvarado, 2019
- Uroxys brachialis Arrow, 1933
- Uroxys brevis Waterhouse, 1891
- Uroxys catharinensis Balthasar, 1966
- Uroxys caucanus Arrow, 1933
- Uroxys chichanich Delgado & Kohlmann, 2007
- Uroxys coarctatus Harold, 1867
- Uroxys corniculatus Harold, 1880
- Uroxys corporaali Balthasar, 1940
- Uroxys cuprescens Westwood, 1842
- Uroxys deavilai Delgado & Kohlmann, 2007
- Uroxys dilaticollis (Blanchard, 1845)
- Uroxys dybasi Howden & Young, 1981
- Uroxys elongatus Harold, 1868
- Uroxys epipleuralis (Boucomont, 1928)
- Uroxys frankenbergeri Balthasar, 1940
- Uroxys gatunensis Howden & Young, 1981
- Uroxys gorgon Arrow, 1933
- Uroxys histeroides Arrow, 1933
- Uroxys inconspicuus Harold, 1868
- Uroxys kratochvili Balthasar, 1940
- Uroxys laevipennis Kirsch, 1871
- Uroxys latesulcatus Bates, 1892
- Uroxys latus Arrow, 1933
- Uroxys lojanus Arrow, 1933
- Uroxys martinicensis Huchet, 2026
- Uroxys metagorgon Howden & Young, 1981
- Uroxys metallescens Harold, 1868
- Uroxys microcularis Howden & Young, 1981
- Uroxys micros Bates, 1887
- Uroxys minutus Harold, 1868
- Uroxys monstrosus Balthasar, 1940
- Uroxys monstruosus Balthasar, 1940XR
- Uroxys nebulinus Howden & Gill, 1987
- Uroxys ohausi (Balthasar, 1938)
- Uroxys pauliani Balthasar, 1940
- Uroxys peruanus Balthasar, 1940
- Uroxys platypyga Howden & Young, 1981
- Uroxys productus Arrow, 1933
- Uroxys punctatus Nazaré-Silva, Moura & Silva, 2023
- Uroxys pygmaeus Harold, 1883
- Uroxys rugatus Boucomont, 1928
- Uroxys simplex Waterhouse, 1891
- Uroxys spaethi Balthasar, 1940
- Uroxys striatus Harold, 1868
- Uroxys sulai Balthasar, 1940
- Uroxys sulcicollis Harold, 1880
- Uroxys tacanensis Delgado & Kohlmann, 2007
- Uroxys terminalis Waterhouse, 1891
- Uroxys transversifrons Howden & Gill, 1987
- Uroxys trinitatis Arrow, 1933
- Uroxys tuberculatus Lansberge, 1874
- Uroxys variabilis Robinson, 1951
- Uroxys vincentiae Arrow, 1903
