= Uroxys corporaali =

Scientific classification
- Kingdom: Animalia
- Phylum: Arthropoda
- Clade: Pancrustacea
- Class: Insecta
- Order: Coleoptera
- Suborder: Polyphaga
- Infraorder: Scarabaeiformia
- Family: Scarabaeidae
- Genus: Uroxys
- Species: U. corporaali

Binomial name
- Uroxys corporaali Balthasar, 1940

Species of beetle

Uroxys corporaali is a species of beetle of the family Scarabaeidae. It is found in Argentina, Paraguay and Peru.
