= Trichillidium quadridens =

Scientific classification
- Kingdom: Animalia
- Phylum: Arthropoda
- Clade: Pancrustacea
- Class: Insecta
- Order: Coleoptera
- Suborder: Polyphaga
- Infraorder: Scarabaeiformia
- Family: Scarabaeidae
- Genus: Trichillidium
- Species: T. quadridens

Binomial name
- Trichillidium quadridens (Arrow, 1932)

Synonyms
- Pedaridium quadridens Arrow, 1932

Species of beetle

Trichillidium quadridens is a species of beetle of the family Scarabaeidae. It is found in Argentina, Bolivia, Paraguay and Peru.
