= Agamopus castaneus =

Scientific classification
- Kingdom: Animalia
- Phylum: Arthropoda
- Clade: Pancrustacea
- Class: Insecta
- Order: Coleoptera
- Suborder: Polyphaga
- Infraorder: Scarabaeiformia
- Family: Scarabaeidae
- Genus: Agamopus
- Species: A. castaneus

Binomial name
- Agamopus castaneus Balthasar, 1938

Species of beetle

Agamopus castaneus is a species of beetle of the family Scarabaeidae. It is found in Brazil (Amapá, Roraima), French Guiana and Suriname.

== Description ==
Adults reach a length of about 6.5 mm (0.26 in). They resemble Agamopus unguicularis in its light brown colour and head completely covered by dense punctation, but castaneus can be distinguished by the presence of one row with two or three yellow setae on the pygidium. Agamopus unguicularis has a row of yellow setae disposed parallel to the anterior margin of the sulcus.
