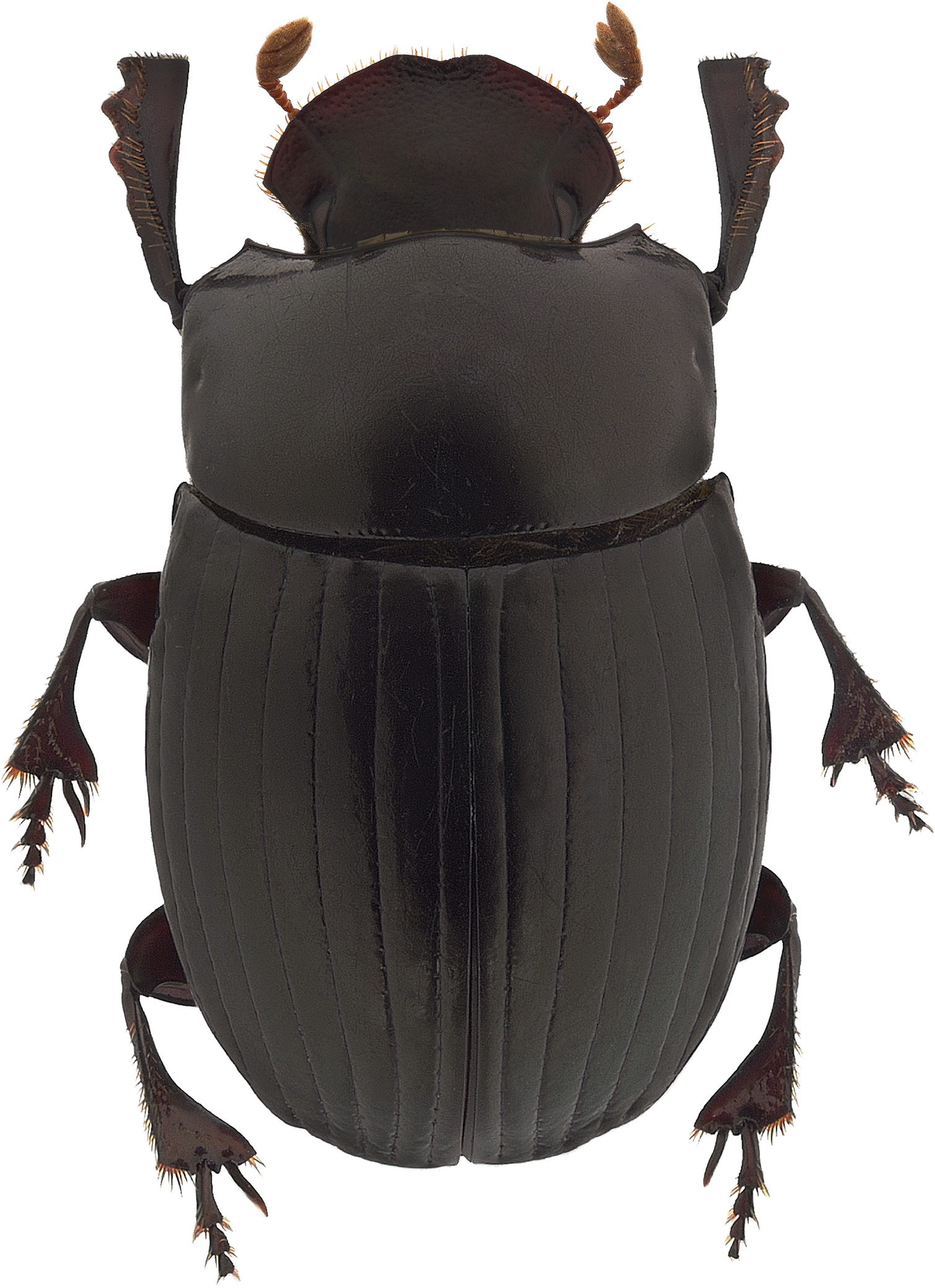
- Ateuchus

Scientific classification
- Kingdom: Animalia
- Phylum: Arthropoda
- Clade: Pancrustacea
- Class: Insecta
- Order: Coleoptera
- Suborder: Polyphaga
- Infraorder: Scarabaeiformia
- Family: Scarabaeidae
- Subfamily: Scarabaeinae
- Tribe: Ateuchini
- Genus: Ateuchus; Weber, 1801

Synonyms
- Choeridium Lepeletier & Serville, 1828

= Ateuchus =

Genus of beetles

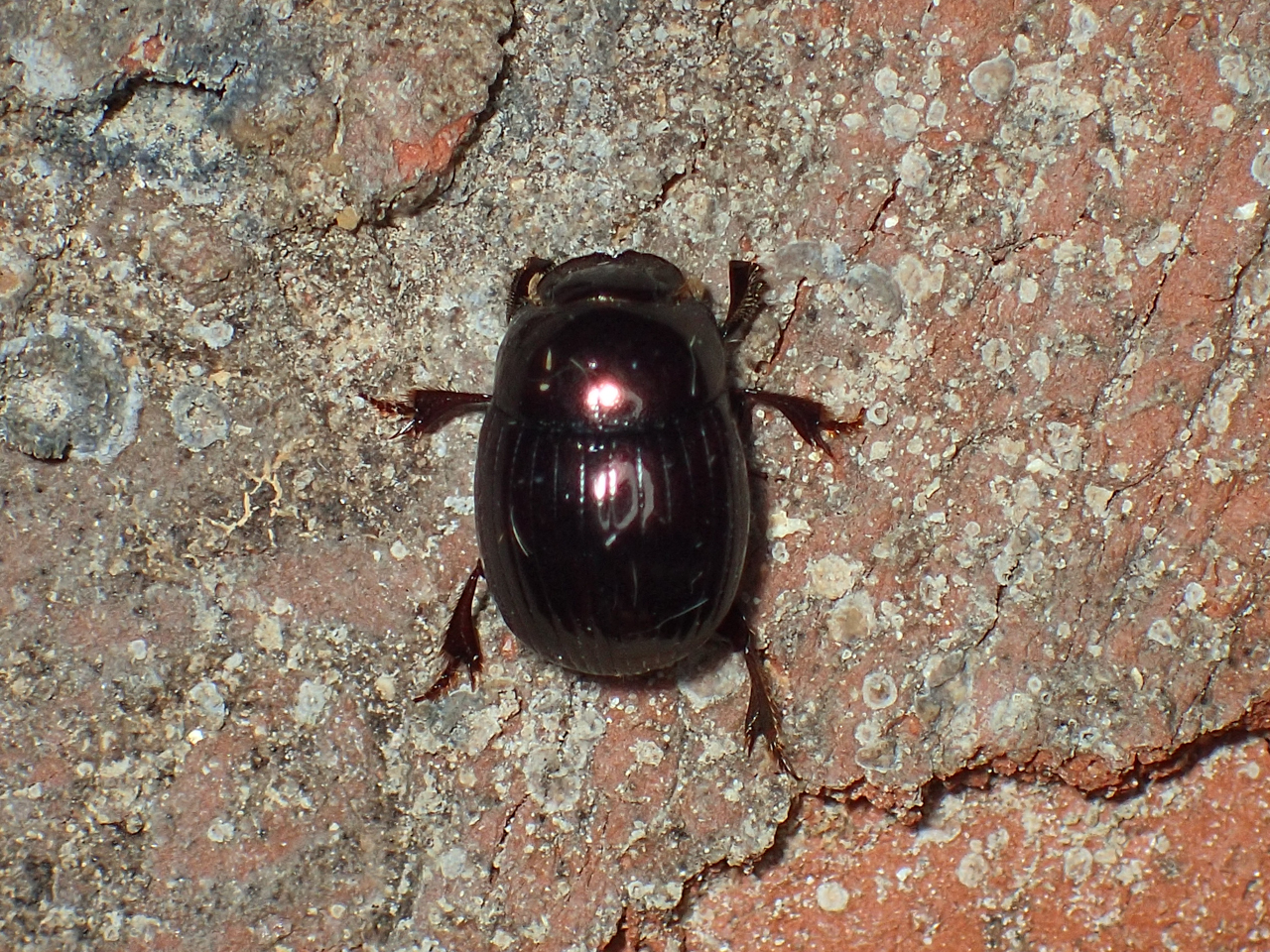
Ateuchus histeroides, Alabama

Ateuchus is a genus of some 100 species of New World scarab beetles (Scarabaeidae) in the subfamily Scarabaeinae. They are found mainly in the Neotropics.

== Description ==
The species range in shape from oval to very convex. The scutellum is concealed, the elytra have eight striae (grooves), and the clypeus is bidentate.

== Species ==
These species belong to the genus Ateuchus:

- Ateuchus aeneomicans (Harold, 1868) (Neotropics)
- Ateuchus alipioi (Pereira, 1954) (Brazil)
- Ateuchus alutacius Kohlmann & Solis, 2012 (Costa Rica)
- Ateuchus alvarezi (Martinez & Halffter, 1986) (Brazil, Venezuela, Guyana)
- Ateuchus ambiguus Martinez & Martinez, 1990 (Venezuela)
- Ateuchus apicatus (Harold, 1867) (Argentina, Brazil, Paraguay)
- Ateuchus asperatus (Harold, 1881) (Brazil)
- Ateuchus balthasari Martinez, 1952 (Paraguay)
- Ateuchus bordoni Martinez & Martinez, 1990 (Venezuela)
- Ateuchus breve (Harold, 1868) (Brazil)
- Ateuchus calcaratus (Harold, 1868) (Panama, French Guiana, Brazil)
- Ateuchus candezei (Harold, 1868) (Neotropics)
- Ateuchus carbonarius (Harold, 1868) (Argentina, Brazil)
- Ateuchus carcavalloi Vulcano, Pereira & Martinez, 1976 (Argentina, Bolivia)
- Ateuchus carolinae Kohlmann, 1981 (Mexico)
- Ateuchus cernyi (Balthasar, 1939) (Brazil)
- Ateuchus chrysopygus (Bates, 1887) (Guatemala, Mexico, Belize, El Salvador, Honduras)
- Ateuchus colossus Moctezuma, Sánchez-Huerta & Halffter, 2018 (Mexico)
- Ateuchus columbianus (Harold, 1868) (Colombia, Peru)
- Ateuchus confusus Martinez & Martinez, 1987 (Bolivia)
- Ateuchus connexus (Harold, 1868) (Brazil, Bolivia, Peru, Ecuador, Venezuela, Guyana)
- Ateuchus contractus (Balthasar, 1939) (Paraguay)
- Ateuchus convexus (Balthasar, 1965) (Brazil)
- Ateuchus cujuchi Génier, 2015 (Bolivia)
- Ateuchus earthorus Kohlmann & Solis, 2009 (Costa Rica)
- Ateuchus ecuadorensis (Boucomont, 1928) (Ecuador)
- Ateuchus euchalceus (Balthasar, 1939) (Bolivia, Argentina)
- Ateuchus fedescobari Montoya-Molina, 2021 (Colombia)
- Ateuchus femoratus Fabricius, 1801 (Guyana)
- Ateuchus fetteri Kohlmann, 1996 (Costa Rica)
- Ateuchus floridensis Génier, 2000 (Florida)
- Ateuchus freudei (Balthasar, 1966) (Brazil, Colombia)
- Ateuchus frontale (Boucomont, 1928) (Bolivia)
- Ateuchus fuscipes (Blanchard, 1845) (Bolivia)
- Ateuchus genieri Montoya-Molino, 2019 (Brazil)
- Ateuchus gershensoni Kohlmann, 2000 (Mexico)
- Ateuchus ginae Kohlmann, 1996 (Panama, Costa Rica, Nicaragua)
- Ateuchus globulus (Boucomont, 1928) (French Guiana, Peru)
- Ateuchus granigerus (Harold, 1875) (Brazil)
- Ateuchus guatemalensis (Bates, 1887) (Guatemala, Honduras, Mexico, Nicaragua)
- Ateuchus halffteri Kohlmann, 1981 (Mexico)
- Ateuchus hamatus (Boucomont, 1928) (Brazil)
- Ateuchus hendrichsi Kohlmann, 1996 (Costa Rica)
- Ateuchus histeroides Weber, 1801 (United States)
- Ateuchus histrio (Balthasar, 1939) (Brazil)
- Ateuchus hoplopygus (Harold, 1868) (Colombia)
- Ateuchus hornai (Balthasar, 1939) (Mexico)
- Ateuchus howdeni Kohlmann, 1996 (Panama, Costa Rica)
- Ateuchus hypocrita (Balthasar, 1939) (Brazil)
- Ateuchus illaesus (Harold, 1868) (Mexico, Grenada, Grenadines, Colombia, Belize, Caribbean)
- Ateuchus irinus (Balthasar, 1939) (French Guiana, Brazil, Suriname)
- Ateuchus klugi (Harold, 1868) (Mexico)
- Ateuchus laetitiae Kohlmann, 1981 (Mexico, Belize)
- Ateuchus laevicolle (Harold, 1868) (Brazil)
- Ateuchus laterale (Harold, 1868) (Argentina)
- Ateuchus latus (Boucomont, 1928) (Brazil, Argentina)
- Ateuchus lecontei (Harold, 1868) (United States)
- Ateuchus loricatus (Boucomont, 1928) (Brazil)
- Ateuchus luciae Matthews, 1966 (Saint Lucia)
- Ateuchus murrayi (Harold, 1868) (French Guiana, Suriname, Brazil, Colombia)
- Ateuchus mutilatus (Harold, 1867) (Argentina, Brazil)
- Ateuchus myrmecophilus (Boucomont, 1935) (Brazil)
- Ateuchus nitidulus (Castelnau, 1840) (Mexico)
- Ateuchus oblongus (Harold, 1883) (Brazil, Suriname)
- Ateuchus opacipennis (Boucomont, 1928) (Trinidad & Tobago, Colombia)
- Ateuchus ovalis (Boucomont, 1928) (Paraguay, Bolivia, Argentina, Brazil)
- Ateuchus parvus (Balthasar, 1939) (Ecuador, Colombia)
- Ateuchus pauki (Balthasar, 1939) (Brazil, French Guiana, Guyana)
- Ateuchus pauperatus (Germar, 1823) (Argentina, Brazil, Uruguay)
- Ateuchus perezvelai Kohlmann, 2000 (Mexico)
- Ateuchus perpusillus Kohlmann, 2000 (Honduras, Guatemala)
- Ateuchus persplendens (Balthasar, 1939) (Colombia)
- Ateuchus peruanus (Balthasar, 1939) (Peru)
- Ateuchus procerus (Harold, 1883) (Brazil)
- Ateuchus pruneus (Boucomont, 1928) (Brazil)
- Ateuchus punctatissimus (Génier, 2010) (Brazil)
- Ateuchus puncticolle (Harold, 1867) (Brazil)
- Ateuchus pygidialis (Harold, 1868) (Neotropics)
- Ateuchus rispolii Martinez, 1952 (Argentina)
- Ateuchus robustus (Harold, 1868) (Argentina, Brazil, Uruguay)
- Ateuchus rodriguezi (Preudhomme de Borre, 1886) (Neotropics)
- Ateuchus romani (Boucomont, 1928) (Brazil, French Guiana)
- Ateuchus scatimoides (Balthasar, 1939) (Ecuador, Colombia)
- Ateuchus semicribratus (Harold, 1868) (Brazil)
- Ateuchus setulosus (Balthasar, 1939) (French Guiana, Brazil, Guyana)
- Ateuchus simplex (Le Peletier & Serville, 1828) (French Guiana, Suriname, Brazil, Peru)
- Ateuchus solisi Kohlmann, 1996 (Costa Rica)
- Ateuchus squalidus (Fabricius, 1775) (Brazil)
- Ateuchus steinbachi (Boucomont, 1928) (Bolivia)
- Ateuchus striatulus (Preudhomme de Borre, 1886) (Brazil, Peru)
- Ateuchus subquadratus (Harold, 1868) (Brazil)
- Ateuchus substriatus (Harold, 1868) (Suriname, French Guiana, Peru, Brazil)
- Ateuchus tenebrosus (Balthasar, 1945) (Brazil)
- Ateuchus texanus (Robinson, 1948) (Mexico, Texas)
- Ateuchus tona Lopera, Chamorro & Cupello, 2020 (Colombia)
- Ateuchus tuza Kohlmann & Vaz-de-Mello, 2018 (Mexico)
- Ateuchus viduus (Blanchard, 1845) (Argentina, Bolivia, Brazil)
- Ateuchus vigilans (Lansberge, 1874) (Brazil)
- Ateuchus viridimicans (Boucomont, 1935) (Paraguay, Brazil)
- Ateuchus vividus Germar, 1823 (Brazil)
- Ateuchus zoebischi Kohlmann, 1996 (Costa Rica)

== Selected former species ==
- Ateuchus tridenticeps (Arrow, 1913) (Brazil)
