= Trichillidium =

- Trichillidium quadridens

Scientific classification
- Kingdom: Animalia
- Phylum: Arthropoda
- Clade: Pancrustacea
- Class: Insecta
- Order: Coleoptera
- Suborder: Polyphaga
- Infraorder: Scarabaeiformia
- Family: Scarabaeidae
- Subfamily: Scarabaeinae
- Tribe: Ateuchini
- Genus: Trichillidium; Vaz-de-Mello, 2008

Genus of beetles

Trichillidium is a genus of beetles of the family Scarabaeidae.

== Species ==
- Trichillidium brevisetosum (Howden & Young, 1981)
- Trichillidium caingua (Martinez, 1974)
- Trichillidium pilosum (Robinson, 1948)
- Trichillidium quadridens (Arrow, 1932)
