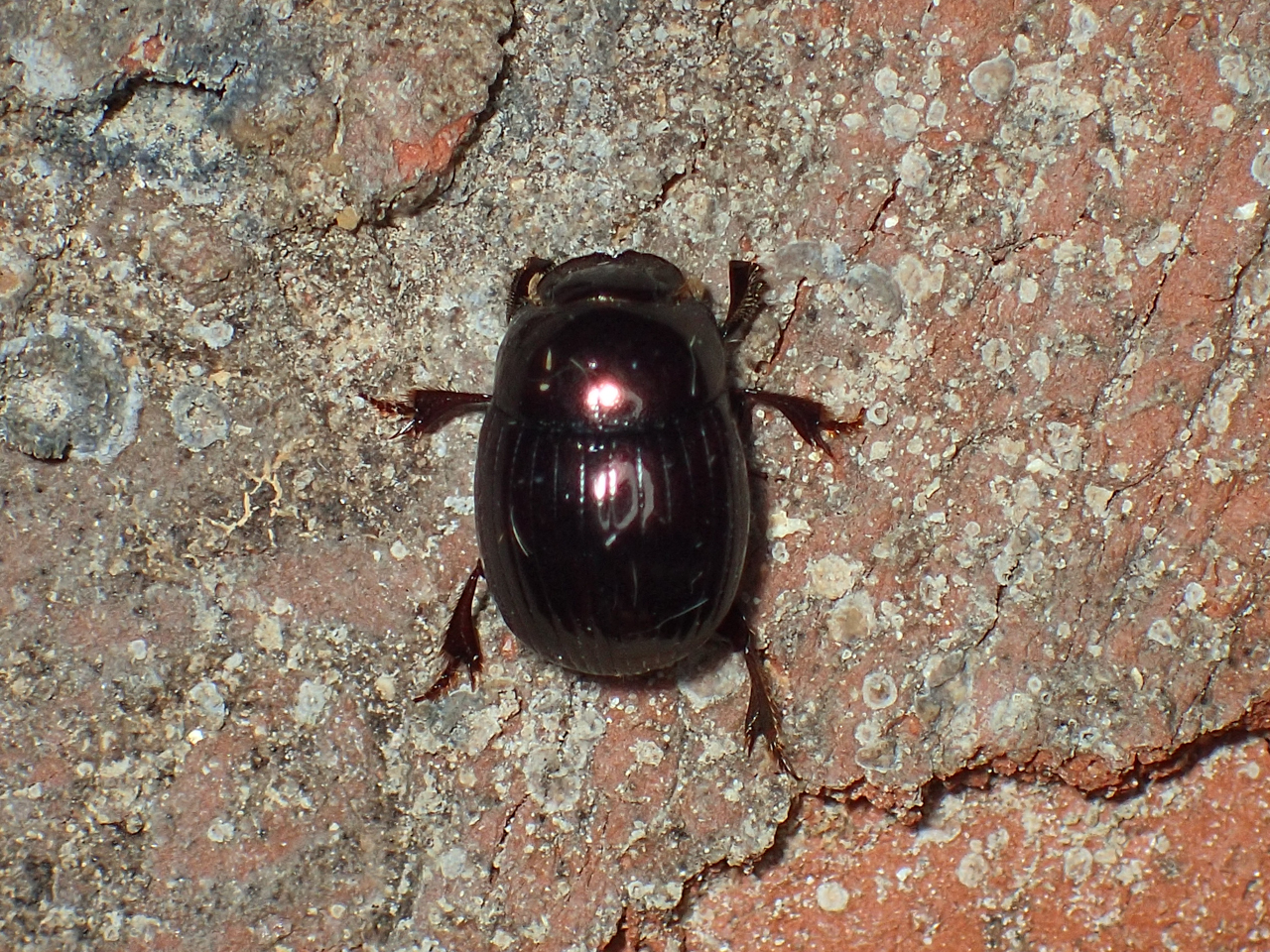

Scientific classification
- Domain: Eukaryota
- Kingdom: Animalia
- Phylum: Arthropoda
- Class: Insecta
- Order: Coleoptera
- Suborder: Polyphaga
- Infraorder: Scarabaeiformia
- Family: Scarabaeidae
- Genus: Ateuchus
- Species: A. histeroides

Binomial name
- Ateuchus histeroides Weber, 1801

Synonyms
- Ateuchus capistratus Fabricius, 1801; Choeridium punctatus Robinson, 1948

= Ateuchus histeroides =

Species of beetle

Ateuchus histeroides is a species of dung beetle in the family Scarabaeidae.
