= Agamopus viridis =

Scientific classification
- Kingdom: Animalia
- Phylum: Arthropoda
- Clade: Pancrustacea
- Class: Insecta
- Order: Coleoptera
- Suborder: Polyphaga
- Infraorder: Scarabaeiformia
- Family: Scarabaeidae
- Genus: Agamopus
- Species: A. viridis

Binomial name
- Agamopus viridis Boucomont, 1928

Species of beetle

Agamopus viridis is a species of beetle of the family Scarabaeidae. It is found in Brazil (Bahia, Distrito Federal, Espírito Santo, Goiás, Mato Grosso, Mato Grosso do Sul, Minas Gerais, Rio de Janeiro, São Paulo) and Paraguay.

== Description ==
Agamopus viridis and Agamopus joker are easily separated from other Agamopus species by the presence of two small tubercles on the frons, which are absent in all other species of the genus. The latter two species can be separated by the presence, in viridis, of an arched pygidial sulcus, which is sinuous in joker.
