= Agamopus =

Scientific classification
- Kingdom: Animalia
- Phylum: Arthropoda
- Clade: Pancrustacea
- Class: Insecta
- Order: Coleoptera
- Suborder: Polyphaga
- Infraorder: Scarabaeiformia
- Family: Scarabaeidae
- Tribe: Ateuchini
- Genus: Agamopus; Bates, 1887

Genus of beetles

Agamopus is a genus of Scarabaeidae or scarab beetles.

== Species ==
- Agamopus castaneus Balthasar, 1938
- Agamopus joker Costa-Silva, Carvalho & Vaz-de-Mello, 2022
- Agamopus lampros Bates, 1887
- Agamopus unguicularis (Harold, 1883)
- Agamopus viridis Boucomont, 1928
