= Ateuchus substriatus =

Scientific classification
- Kingdom: Animalia
- Phylum: Arthropoda
- Clade: Pancrustacea
- Class: Insecta
- Order: Coleoptera
- Suborder: Polyphaga
- Infraorder: Scarabaeiformia
- Family: Scarabaeidae
- Genus: Ateuchus
- Species: A. substriatus

Binomial name
- Ateuchus substriatus (Harold, 1868)

Synonyms
- Choeridium substriatum Harold, 1868

Species of beetle

Ateuchus substriatus is a species of beetle of the family Scarabaeidae. It is found in Brazil (Acre, Rondônia), French Guiana, Peru, Suriname and Venezuela.
