= Bdelyropsis =

Scientific classification
- Kingdom: Animalia
- Phylum: Arthropoda
- Class: Insecta
- Order: Coleoptera
- Suborder: Polyphaga
- Infraorder: Scarabaeiformia
- Family: Scarabaeidae
- Tribe: Onthophagini
- Genus: Bdelyropsis; Pereira, Vulcano & Martínez, 1960

Species
- Bdelyropsis bowditchi; Bdelyropsis newtoni; Bdelyropsis venezuelensis

Genus of beetles

Bdelyropsis is a genus of scarab beetles (Scarabaeidae).

== Species ==
- Bdelyropsis bowditchi
- Bdelyropsis newtoni
  - Identified as near threatened on IUCN Red List
- Bdelyropsis venezuelensis
