= Agamopus lampros =

Scientific classification
- Kingdom: Animalia
- Phylum: Arthropoda
- Clade: Pancrustacea
- Class: Insecta
- Order: Coleoptera
- Suborder: Polyphaga
- Infraorder: Scarabaeiformia
- Family: Scarabaeidae
- Genus: Agamopus
- Species: A. lampros

Binomial name
- Agamopus lampros Bates, 1887

Species of beetle

Agamopus lampros is a species of beetle of the family Scarabaeidae. It is found in Colombia, Costa Rica, El Salvador, Guatemala, Mexico (Chiapas, Colima, Jalisco, Oaxaca), Nicaragua, Panama and Venezuela.

== Description ==
Adults reach a length of about 4.5 mm (0.18 in). They are easily recognizable by their remarkably smooth head, without punctation.
