= Agamopus joker =

Scientific classification
- Kingdom: Animalia
- Phylum: Arthropoda
- Clade: Pancrustacea
- Class: Insecta
- Order: Coleoptera
- Suborder: Polyphaga
- Infraorder: Scarabaeiformia
- Family: Scarabaeidae
- Genus: Agamopus
- Species: A. joker

Binomial name
- Agamopus joker Costa-Silva, Carvalho & Vaz-de-Mello, 2022

Species of beetle

Agamopus joker is a species of beetle of the family Scarabaeidae. It is found in Brazil (Paraná).

== Description ==
Adults reach a length of about 5.6 mm (0.22 in). They have a dark brown, metallic, oblong body.

== Etymology ==
The species is named after the supervillain from the DC Comics Universe and refers to the sinuous pygidial sulcus of this species, which resembles the shape of a smiley clown’s mouth.
