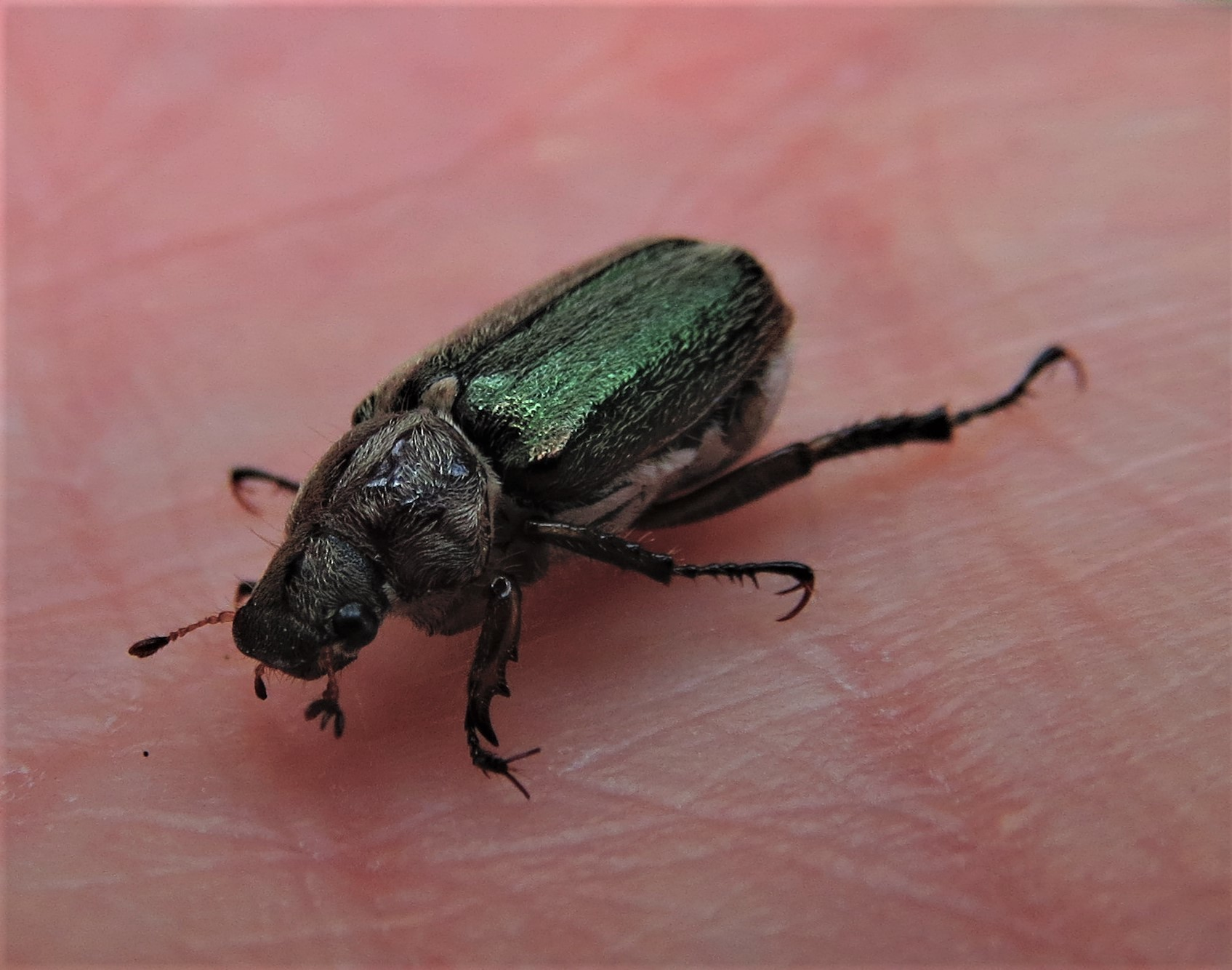

Scientific classification
- Kingdom: Animalia
- Phylum: Arthropoda
- Class: Insecta
- Order: Coleoptera
- Suborder: Polyphaga
- Infraorder: Scarabaeiformia
- Family: Scarabaeidae
- Tribe: Dichelonychini
- Genus: Dichelonyx
- Species: D. vicina

Binomial name
- Dichelonyx vicina Fall, 1901

Synonyms
- Dichelonyx columbiana Hopping, 1931; Dichelonyx deserta Hopping, 1931

= Dichelonyx vicina =

Species of beetle

Dichelonyx vicina is a species of scarab beetle in the family Scarabaeidae. It is found in North America.

== Subspecies ==
These two subspecies belong to the species Dichelonyx vicina:

- Dichelonyx vicina columbiana Hopping, 1931
- Dichelonyx vicina vicina
