= Dichelonyx pusilla =

Scientific classification
- Kingdom: Animalia
- Phylum: Arthropoda
- Class: Insecta
- Order: Coleoptera
- Suborder: Polyphaga
- Infraorder: Scarabaeiformia
- Family: Scarabaeidae
- Genus: Dichelonyx
- Species: D. pusilla

Binomial name
- Dichelonyx pusilla LeConte, 1856

Species of beetle

Dichelonyx pusilla is a species of scarab beetle in the family Scarabaeidae. It is found in Central America and North America.
