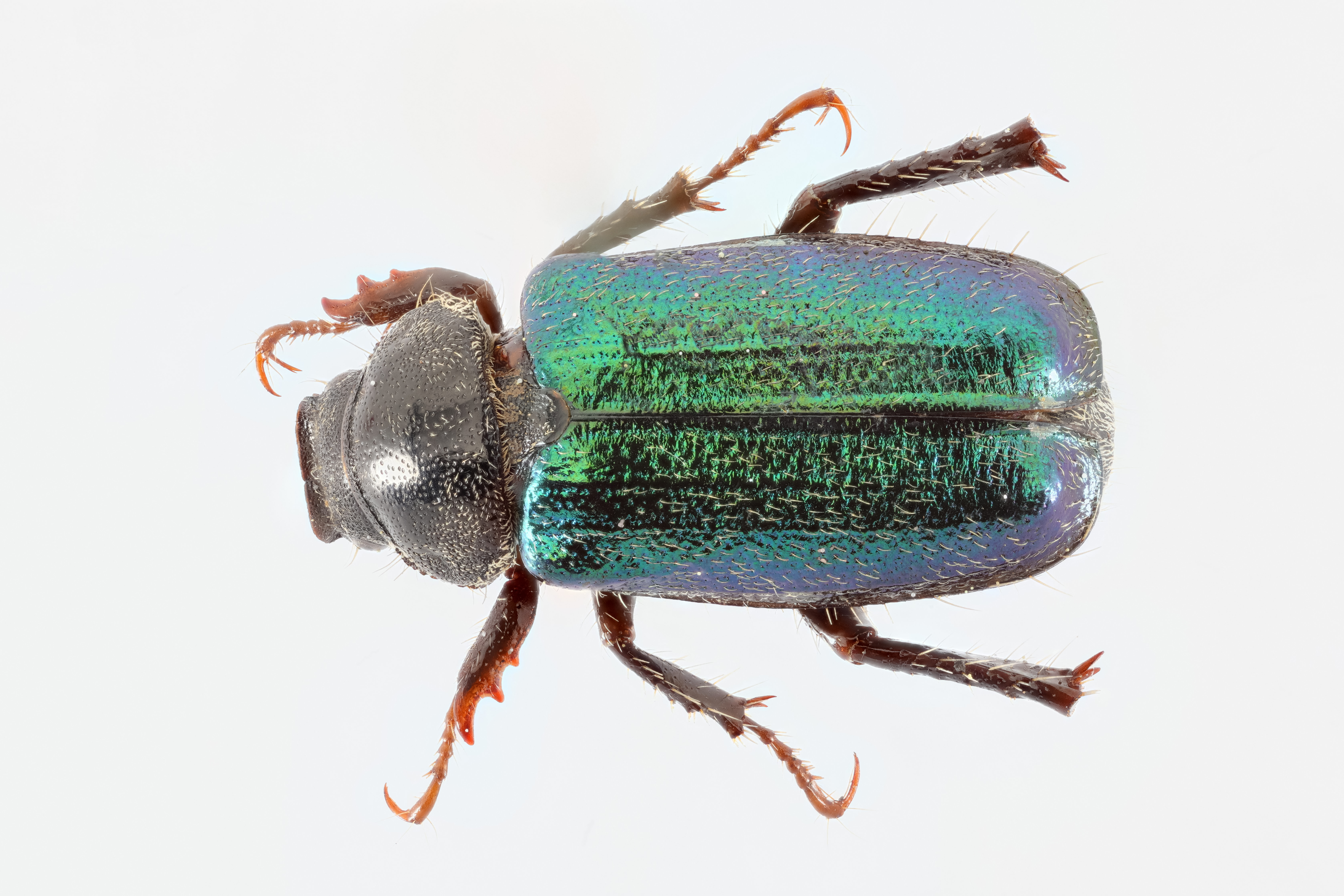
- Dichelonyx sp.

Scientific classification
- Kingdom: Animalia
- Phylum: Arthropoda
- Class: Insecta
- Order: Coleoptera
- Suborder: Polyphaga
- Infraorder: Scarabaeiformia
- Family: Scarabaeidae
- Tribe: Dichelonychini
- Genus: Dichelonyx; Harris, 1827

Synonyms
- Anaeretes Dejean, 1833; Philochloenia Dejean, 1836; Dichelonycha Kirby, 1837

= Dichelonyx =

Genus of beetles

Dichelonyx is a genus of May beetles and junebugs in the family Scarabaeidae. There are at least 30 described species in Dichelonyx.

== Selected species ==
- Dichelonyx albicollis Burmeister, 1855
- Dichelonyx backii Kirby, 1837 (green pine chafer)
- Dichelonyx canadensis Horn, 1876
- Dichelonyx clypeata Horn, 1876
- Dichelonyx crumbi Hatch, 1971
- Dichelonyx decolorata Fall, 1901
- Dichelonyx diluta Fall, 1901
- Dichelonyx elongata (Fabricius, 1792)
- Dichelonyx elongatula (Schönherr, 1817)
- Dichelonyx fulgida (LeConte, 1856)
- Dichelonyx fuscula LeConte, 1856
- Dichelonyx kirbyi Brown, 1946
- Dichelonyx lateralis Fall, 1901
- Dichelonyx linearis (Gyllenhaal, 1817)
- Dichelonyx muscula Fall, 1901
- Dichelonyx nana Fall, 1901
- Dichelonyx oregona (Van Dyke, 1918)
- Dichelonyx pallens LeConte, 1856
- Dichelonyx picea Horn, 1894
- Dichelonyx pusilla LeConte, 1856
- Dichelonyx robusta Fall, 1901
- Dichelonyx subvittata LeConte, 1856
- Dichelonyx sulcata LeConte, 1856
- Dichelonyx testaceipennis Fall, 1907
- Dichelonyx truncata LeConte, 1856
- Dichelonyx vaga Fall, 1901
- Dichelonyx valida LeConte, 1856
- Dichelonyx vandykei Saylor, 1932
- Dichelonyx vicina Fall, 1901
- Dichelonyx violaceipennis (Blanchard, 1850)
