= Gymnopyge hopliaeformis =

Scientific classification
- Kingdom: Animalia
- Phylum: Arthropoda
- Class: Insecta
- Order: Coleoptera
- Suborder: Polyphaga
- Infraorder: Scarabaeiformia
- Family: Scarabaeidae
- Genus: Gymnopyge
- Species: G. hopliaeformis

Binomial name
- Gymnopyge hopliaeformis Linell, 1896

Species of beetle

Gymnopyge hopliaeformis is a species of scarab beetle in the family Scarabaeidae. It is found in North America.
