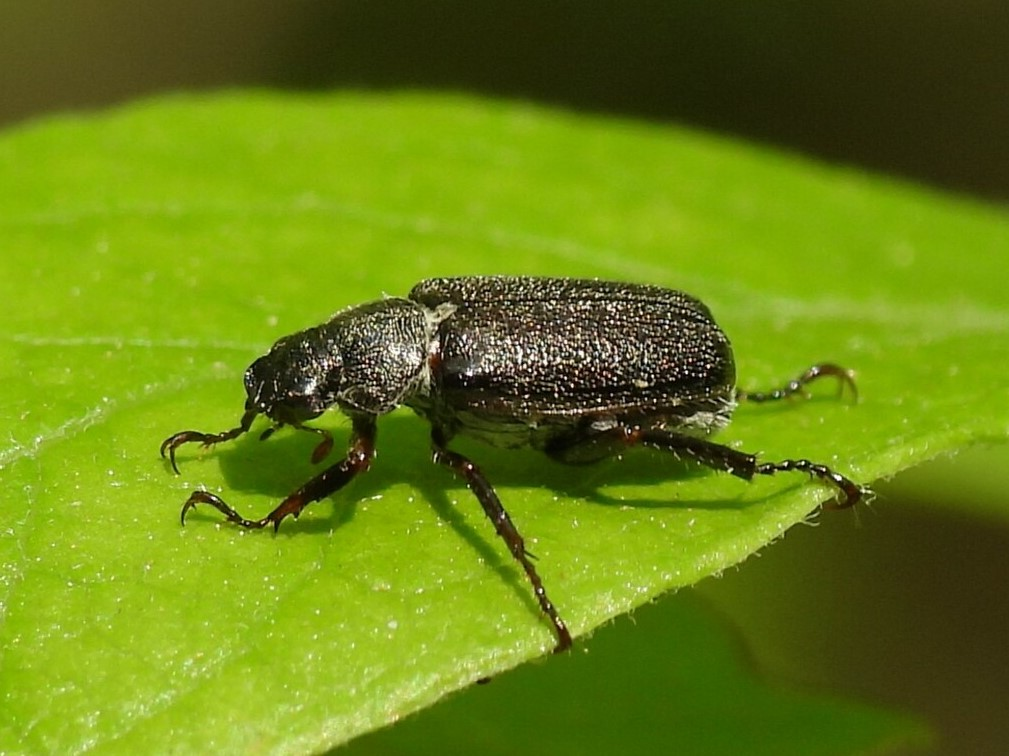

Scientific classification
- Kingdom: Animalia
- Phylum: Arthropoda
- Class: Insecta
- Order: Coleoptera
- Suborder: Polyphaga
- Infraorder: Scarabaeiformia
- Family: Scarabaeidae
- Genus: Dichelonyx
- Species: D. fuscula

Binomial name
- Dichelonyx fuscula LeConte, 1856

= Dichelonyx fuscula =

Species of beetle

Dichelonyx fuscula is a species of scarab beetle in the family Scarabaeidae. It is found in North America.
