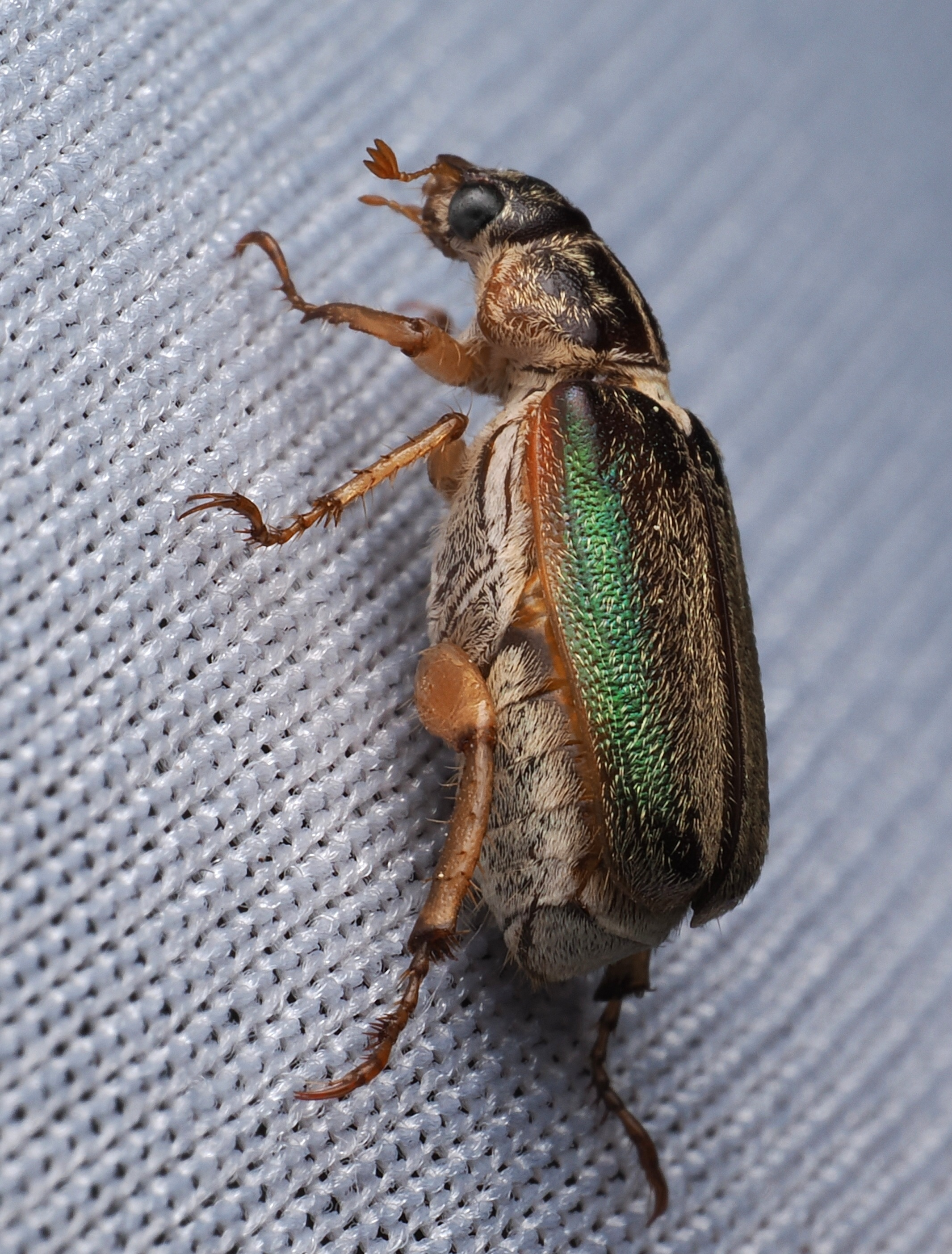

Scientific classification
- Kingdom: Animalia
- Phylum: Arthropoda
- Clade: Pancrustacea
- Class: Insecta
- Order: Coleoptera
- Suborder: Polyphaga
- Infraorder: Scarabaeiformia
- Family: Scarabaeidae
- Genus: Dichelonyx
- Species: D. backii

Binomial name
- Dichelonyx backii Kirby, 1837

Synonyms
- Dichelonyx arizonica Barrett, 1933; Dichelonyx crotchii Horn, 1876; Dichelonyx fulgida LeConte, 1856; Dichelonyx mormona Fall, 1907; Dichelonyx oregona Van Dyke, 1918

= Dichelonyx backii =

Species of beetle

Dichelonyx backii, known generally as the green pine chafer or green rose chafer, is a species of scarab beetle in the family Scarabaeidae.
