= Gymnopyge =

Scientific classification
- Kingdom: Animalia
- Phylum: Arthropoda
- Class: Insecta
- Order: Coleoptera
- Suborder: Polyphaga
- Infraorder: Scarabaeiformia
- Family: Scarabaeidae
- Tribe: Dichelonychini
- Genus: Gymnopyge; Linell, 1896

Genus of beetles

Gymnopyge is a genus of May beetles and junebugs in the family Scarabaeidae. There are at least four described species in Gymnopyge.

== Species ==
These four species belong to the genus Gymnopyge:

- Gymnopyge coquilletti Linell, 1896
- Gymnopyge hirsuta Cazier, 1939
- Gymnopyge hopliaeformis Linell, 1896
- Gymnopyge pygmaea Linell, 1896
