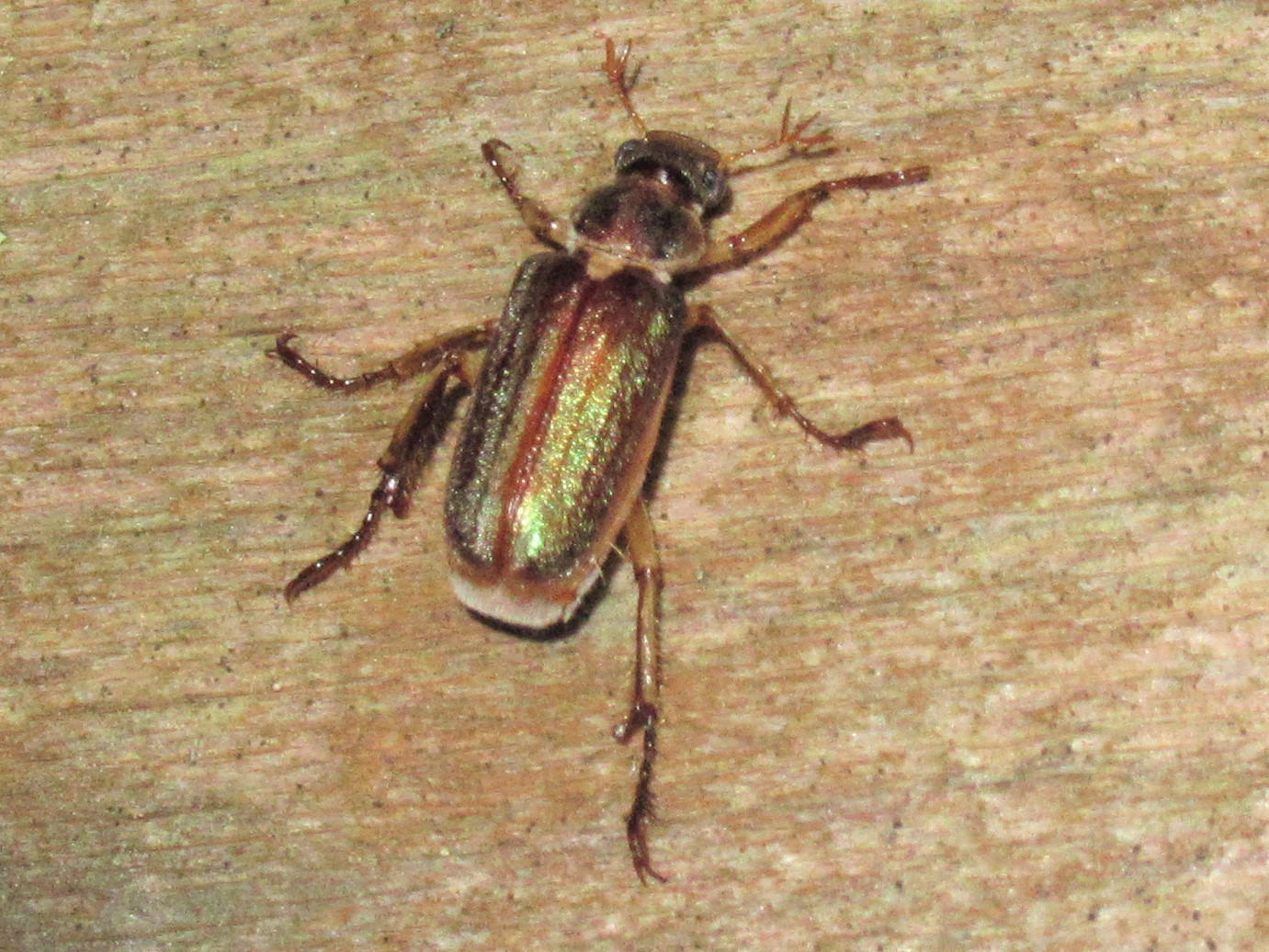

Scientific classification
- Kingdom: Animalia
- Phylum: Arthropoda
- Class: Insecta
- Order: Coleoptera
- Suborder: Polyphaga
- Infraorder: Scarabaeiformia
- Family: Scarabaeidae
- Genus: Dichelonyx
- Species: D. albicollis

Binomial name
- Dichelonyx albicollis Burmeister, 1855

= Dichelonyx albicollis =

Species of beetle

Dichelonyx albicollis is a species of scarab beetle in the family Scarabaeidae. It is found in North America.
