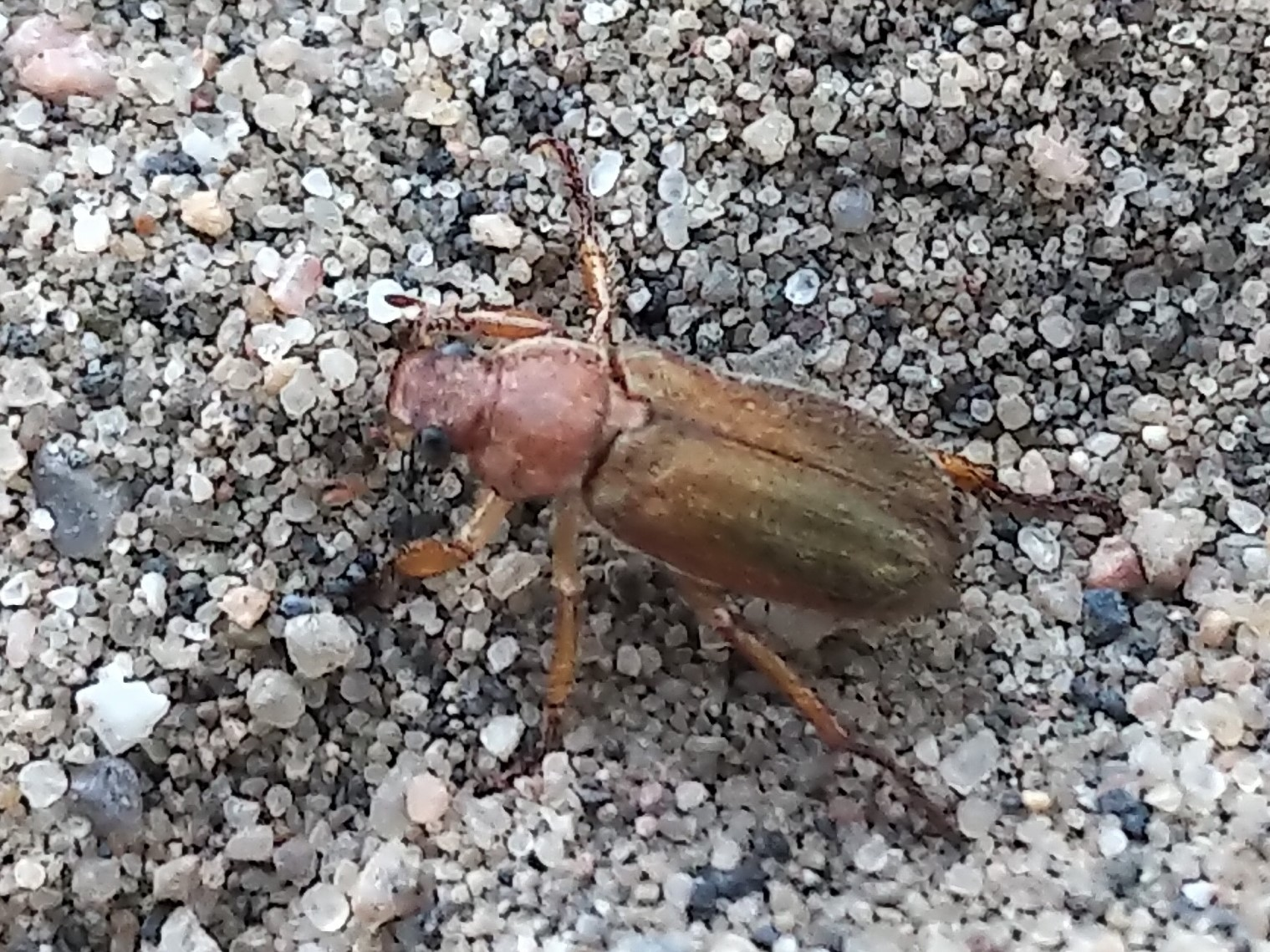

Scientific classification
- Kingdom: Animalia
- Phylum: Arthropoda
- Class: Insecta
- Order: Coleoptera
- Suborder: Polyphaga
- Infraorder: Scarabaeiformia
- Family: Scarabaeidae
- Genus: Dichelonyx
- Species: D. kirbyi

Binomial name
- Dichelonyx kirbyi Brown, 1946

= Dichelonyx kirbyi =

Species of scarab beetle from North America

Dichelonyx kirbyi is a species of scarab beetle in the family Scarabaeidae. It is found in North America.
