= Coenonycha =

- Coenonycha ampla

Scientific classification
- Kingdom: Animalia
- Phylum: Arthropoda
- Clade: Pancrustacea
- Class: Insecta
- Order: Coleoptera
- Suborder: Polyphaga
- Infraorder: Scarabaeiformia
- Family: Scarabaeidae
- Tribe: Dichelonychini
- Genus: Coenonycha; Horn, 1876

Genus of beetles

Coenonycha is a genus of May beetles and junebugs in the family Scarabaeidae. There are more than 30 described species in the genus Coenonycha.

== Species ==
These 34 species belong to the genus Coenonycha:

- Coenonycha acuta Cazier, 1943
- Coenonycha ampla Cazier, 1943
- Coenonycha barri Cazier, 1943
- Coenonycha bowlesi Cazier, 1943
- Coenonycha clementina Casey, 1909
- Coenonycha clypeata McClay, 1943
- Coenonycha crispata McClay, 1943
- Coenonycha dimorpha Evans, 1986
- Coenonycha fuga Cazier, 1943
- Coenonycha fulva McClay, 1943
- Coenonycha fusca McClay, 1943
- Coenonycha globosa McClay, 1943
- Coenonycha hageni Cazier, 1943
- Coenonycha lurida Cazier, 1943
- Coenonycha mediata Cazier, 1943
- Coenonycha ochreata Evans, 1986
- Coenonycha ovatis McClay, 1943
- Coenonycha ovipennis Horn, 1876
- Coenonycha pallida Cazier, 1943
- Coenonycha parvula Fall, 1901
- Coenonycha pascuensis Potts, 1945
- Coenonycha purshiae Cazier, 1943
- Coenonycha pygmaea Smith, 1986
- Coenonycha rotundata (LeConte, 1856)
- Coenonycha rubida McClay, 1943
- Coenonycha santacruzae Evans, 1986
- Coenonycha saylori Cazier, 1943
- Coenonycha scotti McClay, 1943
- Coenonycha sleeperi Evans, 1988
- Coenonycha socialis Horn, 1876
- Coenonycha stohleri Saylor, 1935
- Coenonycha testacea Cazier, 1937
- Coenonycha tingi Cazier, 1937
- Coenonycha utahensis McClay, 1943
