= Coenonycha hageni =

Scientific classification
- Kingdom: Animalia
- Phylum: Arthropoda
- Class: Insecta
- Order: Coleoptera
- Suborder: Polyphaga
- Infraorder: Scarabaeiformia
- Family: Scarabaeidae
- Genus: Coenonycha
- Species: C. hageni

Binomial name
- Coenonycha hageni Cazier, 1943

Species of beetle

Coenonycha hageni is a species of scarab beetle in the family Scarabaeidae. It is found in North America.
