= Dichelonyx elongatula =

Scientific classification
- Kingdom: Animalia
- Phylum: Arthropoda
- Class: Insecta
- Order: Coleoptera
- Suborder: Polyphaga
- Infraorder: Scarabaeiformia
- Family: Scarabaeidae
- Genus: Dichelonyx
- Species: D. elongatula

Binomial name
- Dichelonyx elongatula (Schönherr, 1817)

Synonyms
- Dichelonyx testacea Kirby, 1837; Dichelonyx virescens Kirby, 1837; Melolontha hexagona Germar, 1824; Melolontha linearis Gyllenhal, 1817

Species of beetle

Dichelonyx elongatula is a species of scarab beetle in the family Scarabaeidae. It is found in North America.
