= Dichelonyx canadensis =

Scientific classification
- Kingdom: Animalia
- Phylum: Arthropoda
- Class: Insecta
- Order: Coleoptera
- Suborder: Polyphaga
- Infraorder: Scarabaeiformia
- Family: Scarabaeidae
- Genus: Dichelonyx
- Species: D. canadensis

Binomial name
- Dichelonyx canadensis Horn, 1876

Species of beetle

Dichelonyx canadensis is a species of May beetle or junebug in the family Scarabaeidae. It is found in North America.
