= Dichelonychini =

Scientific classification
- Kingdom: Animalia
- Phylum: Arthropoda
- Class: Insecta
- Order: Coleoptera
- Suborder: Polyphaga
- Infraorder: Scarabaeiformia
- Family: Scarabaeidae
- Subfamily: Melolonthinae
- Tribe: Dichelonychini; Burmeister, 1855

Tribe of beetles

Dichelonychini is a tribe of beetles, known as May beetles and Junebugs, in the family Scarabaeidae. There are at least 3 genera and 60 described species in Dichelonychini.

== Genera ==
These three genera belong to the tribe Dichelonychini:

- Coenonycha Horn, 1876^{i c g b}
- Dichelonyx Harris, 1827^{i c g b}
- Gymnopyge Linell, 1896^{i c g b}

Data sources: i = ITIS, c = Catalogue of Life, g = GBIF, b = Bugguide.net
