= Andinocopris =

Scientific classification
- Kingdom: Animalia
- Phylum: Arthropoda
- Class: Insecta
- Order: Coleoptera
- Suborder: Polyphaga
- Infraorder: Scarabaeiformia
- Family: Scarabaeidae
- Subfamily: Scarabaeinae
- Tribe: Homocoprini
- Genus: Andinocopris; Génier & Darling, 2024

Genus of beetles

Andinocopris is a genus of Scarabaeidae or scarab beetles.

== Species ==
- Andinocopris achamas (Harold, 1867)
- Andinocopris buckleyi (Waterhouse, 1891)
