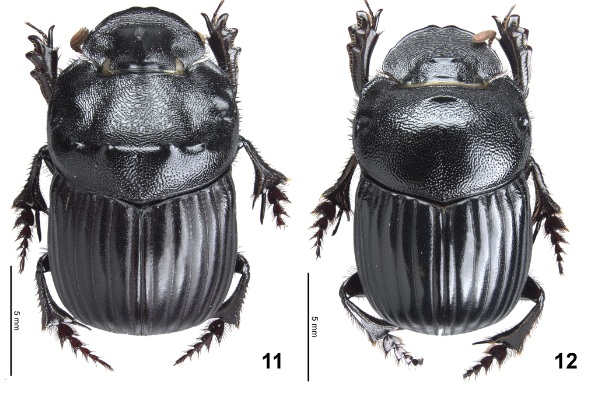

Scientific classification
- Kingdom: Animalia
- Phylum: Arthropoda
- Class: Insecta
- Order: Coleoptera
- Suborder: Polyphaga
- Infraorder: Scarabaeiformia
- Family: Scarabaeidae
- Genus: Homocopris
- Species: H. williami

Binomial name
- Homocopris williami Darling & Génier, 2024

= Homocopris williami =

Species of beetle

Homocopris williami is a species of beetle of the family Scarabaeidae. This species has been recorded from Serra do Mar and Serra Geral Mountains in the Brazilian states of Rio de Janeiro, São Paulo, Santa Catarina, and Rio Grande do Sul, with recorded elevations from 800 to 1600 meters.

== Description ==
Adults reach a length of about 13–19 mm.

== Etymology ==
The species is named in honour of the second author's brother, William Darling.
