= Homocopris =

Scientific classification
- Kingdom: Animalia
- Phylum: Arthropoda
- Class: Insecta
- Order: Coleoptera
- Suborder: Polyphaga
- Infraorder: Scarabaeiformia
- Family: Scarabaeidae
- Subfamily: Scarabaeinae
- Tribe: Homocoprini
- Genus: Homocopris; Burmeister, 1846

Genus of beetles

Homocopris is a genus of Scarabaeidae or scarab beetles.

== Taxonomy ==
The genus was initially established as a subgenus of Copris. Later, the genus was considered a synonym of Dichotomius. Vaz-de-Mello et al. revalidated and elevated Homocopris to the rank of a distinct genus in 2010.

== Species ==
- Homocopris grossiorum Darling & Génier, 2024
- Homocopris punctatissimus (Curtis, 1845)
- Homocopris torulosus (Eschscholtz, 1822)
- Homocopris williami Darling & Génier, 2024
