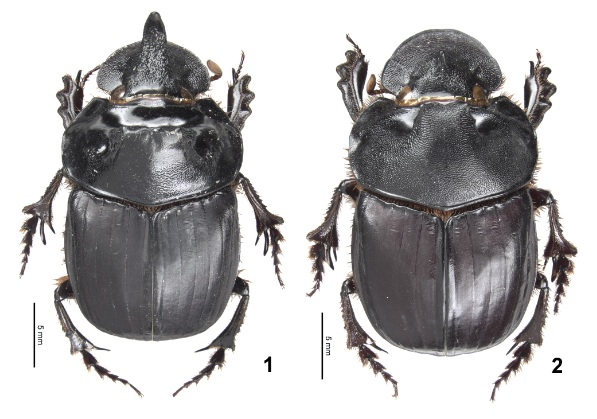

Scientific classification
- Kingdom: Animalia
- Phylum: Arthropoda
- Class: Insecta
- Order: Coleoptera
- Suborder: Polyphaga
- Infraorder: Scarabaeiformia
- Family: Scarabaeidae
- Genus: Andinocopris
- Species: A. achamas

Binomial name
- Andinocopris achamas (Harold, 1867)

Synonyms
- Pinotus achamas Harold, 1867; Dichotomius achamas; Homocopris achamas

= Andinocopris achamas =

Species of beetle

Andinocopris achamas is a species of beetle of the family Scarabaeidae. This species is found at high elevations (2300–3960 meters) in the Colombian and northern Ecuadorian Andes.

== Description ==
Adults reach a length of about 22–34 mm.
