= Homocoprini =

Scientific classification
- Kingdom: Animalia
- Phylum: Arthropoda
- Class: Insecta
- Order: Coleoptera
- Suborder: Polyphaga
- Infraorder: Scarabaeiformia
- Family: Scarabaeidae
- Subfamily: Scarabaeinae
- Tribe: Homocoprini; Génier & Darling, 2024

Tribe of beetles

Homocoprini is a tribe of dung beetles in the family Scarabaeidae.

== Genera ==
- Andinocopris Génier & Darling, 2024
- Homocopris Burmeister, 1846
