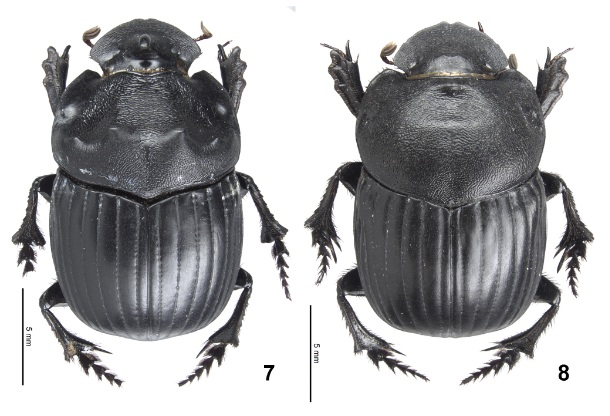

Scientific classification
- Kingdom: Animalia
- Phylum: Arthropoda
- Class: Insecta
- Order: Coleoptera
- Suborder: Polyphaga
- Infraorder: Scarabaeiformia
- Family: Scarabaeidae
- Genus: Homocopris
- Species: H. punctatissimus

Binomial name
- Homocopris punctatissimus (Curtis, 1845)

Synonyms
- Copris punctatissima Curtis, 1845

= Homocopris punctatissimus =

Species of beetle

Homocopris punctatissimus is a species of beetle of the family Scarabaeidae. This species is found in Chile, where it has been recorded in the Región de los Lagos, Región de Los Ríos, Región de Valparaíso, Región del Biobío, Región la Araucanía and Región Metropolitana de Santiago. Recorded elevations range from 500 to 785 meters.

== Description ==
Adults reach a length of about 15–22 mm.
