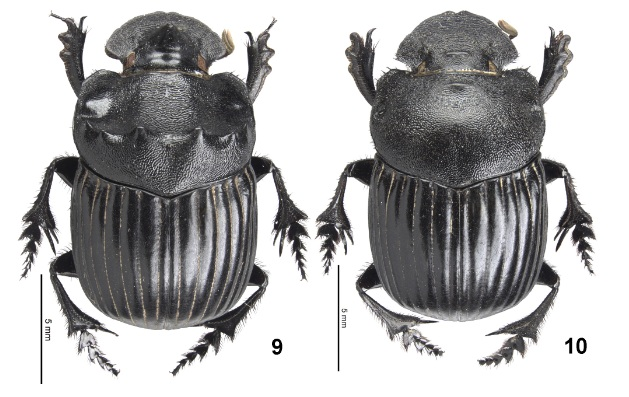

Scientific classification
- Kingdom: Animalia
- Phylum: Arthropoda
- Class: Insecta
- Order: Coleoptera
- Suborder: Polyphaga
- Infraorder: Scarabaeiformia
- Family: Scarabaeidae
- Genus: Homocopris
- Species: H. torulosus

Binomial name
- Homocopris torulosus (Eschscholtz, 1822)

Synonyms
- Copris torulosa Eschscholtz, 1822; Copris valdiviana Philippi, 1859; Pinotus torulosus var. minor Luederwaldt, 1925; Pinotus dahli Landin, 1955

= Homocopris torulosus =

Species of beetle

Homocopris torulosus is a species of beetle of the family Scarabaeidae. This species is found in Chile (Región de los Lagos, Región de Los Ríos, Región de Valparaíso, Región del Biobío, Región del Maule, Región la Araucanía, Región Metropolitana de Santiago) and Argentina (Río Negro). It is found at elevations ranging from 45 1500 meters.

== Description ==
Adults reach a length of about 13–20 mm.
