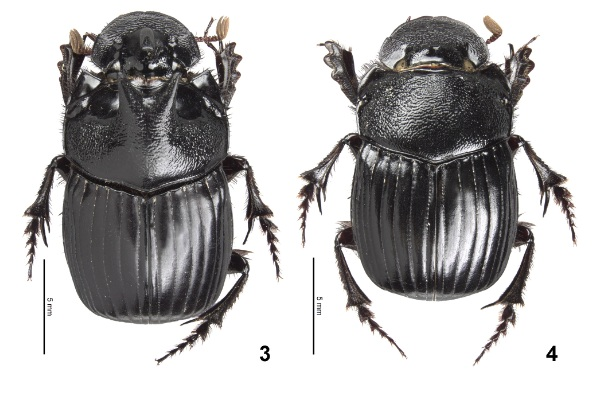

Scientific classification
- Kingdom: Animalia
- Phylum: Arthropoda
- Class: Insecta
- Order: Coleoptera
- Suborder: Polyphaga
- Infraorder: Scarabaeiformia
- Family: Scarabaeidae
- Genus: Andinocopris
- Species: A. buckleyi

Binomial name
- Andinocopris buckleyi (Waterhouse, 1891)

Synonyms
- Pinotus buckleyi Waterhouse, 1891; Homocopris buckleyi; Pinotus simulator Luederwaldt, 1936

= Andinocopris buckleyi =

Species of beetle

Andinocopris buckleyi is a species of beetle of the family Scarabaeidae. This species is found at high elevations (2625–3055 meters) in the Ecuadorian and northern Peruvian Andes

== Description ==
Adults reach a length of about 15–20 mm.
