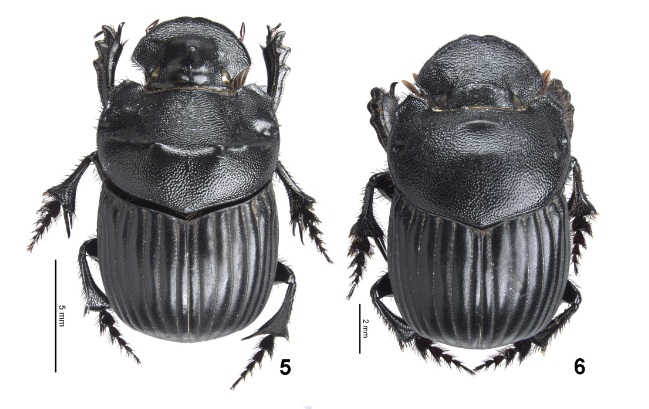

Scientific classification
- Kingdom: Animalia
- Phylum: Arthropoda
- Class: Insecta
- Order: Coleoptera
- Suborder: Polyphaga
- Infraorder: Scarabaeiformia
- Family: Scarabaeidae
- Genus: Homocopris
- Species: H. grossiorum

Binomial name
- Homocopris grossiorum Darling & Génier, 2024

= Homocopris grossiorum =

Species of beetle

Homocopris grossiorum is a species of beetle of the family Scarabaeidae. This species has been recorded from Serra dos Órgãos and Serra da Mantiqueira in the Brazilian states of Minas Gerais, Rio de Janeiro and São Paulo, with recorded elevations between 1150 and 1900 meters.

== Description ==
Adults reach a length of about 11–19 mm.

== Etymology ==
The species is named in honour of Everardo and Paschoal Grossi, two Brazilian collectors and entomologists.
