= Podolasia stillwellorum =

Scientific classification
- Kingdom: Animalia
- Phylum: Arthropoda
- Clade: Pancrustacea
- Class: Insecta
- Order: Coleoptera
- Suborder: Polyphaga
- Infraorder: Scarabaeiformia
- Family: Scarabaeidae
- Genus: Podolasia
- Species: P. stillwellorum

Binomial name
- Podolasia stillwellorum Howden, 1997

Species of beetle

Podolasia stillwellorum is a species of scarab beetle in the family Scarabaeidae. It is found in Central America.
