= Podostena bottimeri =

Scientific classification
- Kingdom: Animalia
- Phylum: Arthropoda
- Clade: Pancrustacea
- Class: Insecta
- Order: Coleoptera
- Suborder: Polyphaga
- Infraorder: Scarabaeiformia
- Family: Scarabaeidae
- Genus: Podostena
- Species: P. bottimeri

Binomial name
- Podostena bottimeri (Howden, 1958)

Species of beetle

Podostena bottimeri is a species of scarab beetle in the family Scarabaeidae. It is found in North America.
