= Podolasiini =

Scientific classification
- Kingdom: Animalia
- Phylum: Arthropoda
- Clade: Pancrustacea
- Class: Insecta
- Order: Coleoptera
- Suborder: Polyphaga
- Infraorder: Scarabaeiformia
- Family: Scarabaeidae
- Subfamily: Melolonthinae
- Tribe: Podolasiini; Howden, 1997

Tribe of beetles

Podolasiini is a tribe of May beetles and junebugs in the family Scarabaeidae. There are at least 2 genera and about 18 described species in Podolasiini.

== Genera ==
These two genera belong to the tribe Podolasiini:

- Podolasia Harold, 1869
- Podostena Howden, 1997
