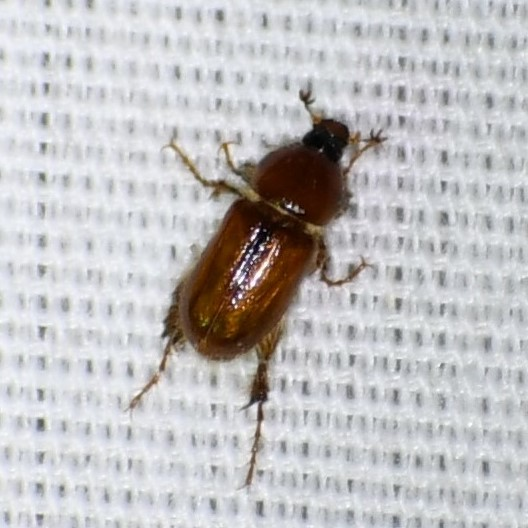
- Podolasia ferruginea

Scientific classification
- Kingdom: Animalia
- Phylum: Arthropoda
- Clade: Pancrustacea
- Class: Insecta
- Order: Coleoptera
- Suborder: Polyphaga
- Infraorder: Scarabaeiformia
- Family: Scarabaeidae
- Tribe: Podolasiini
- Genus: Podolasia; Harold, 1869

= Podolasia (beetle) =

Genus of beetles

Podolasia is a genus of May beetles and junebugs in the family Scarabaeidae. There are about 11 described species in Podolasia.

== Species ==
These 11 species belong to the genus Podolasia:

- Podolasia emarginata Howden, 1954^{i c g}
- Podolasia ferruginea (LeConte, 1856)^{i c g}
- Podolasia involucris Howden, 1998^{i c g}
- Podolasia lavignei Howden, 1997^{i c g}
- Podolasia longipenis Howden, 1997^{c g}
- Podolasia longipennis Howden, 1997^{i}
- Podolasia peninsularis Howden, 1954^{i c g}
- Podolasia pilosa Howden, 1954^{i c g}
- Podolasia rotundipenis Howden, 1997^{i c g}
- Podolasia stillwellorum Howden, 1997^{i c g b}
- Podolasia varicolor Saylor, 1948^{i c g}

Data sources: i = ITIS, c = Catalogue of Life, g = GBIF, b = Bugguide.net
