= Podostena =

Scientific classification
- Kingdom: Animalia
- Phylum: Arthropoda
- Clade: Pancrustacea
- Class: Insecta
- Order: Coleoptera
- Suborder: Polyphaga
- Infraorder: Scarabaeiformia
- Family: Scarabaeidae
- Tribe: Podolasiini
- Genus: Podostena; Howden, 1997

Genus of beetles

Podostena is a genus of May beetles and junebugs in the family Scarabaeidae. There are at least four described species in Podostena.

== Species ==
These four species belong to the genus Podostena:

- Podostena bottimeri (Howden, 1958)
- Podostena litoralis Howden, 1997
- Podostena rileyi Howden, 1997
- Podostena sleeperi Howden, 1997
