= Chnaunanthus chapini =

Scientific classification
- Kingdom: Animalia
- Phylum: Arthropoda
- Class: Insecta
- Order: Coleoptera
- Suborder: Polyphaga
- Infraorder: Scarabaeiformia
- Family: Scarabaeidae
- Genus: Chnaunanthus
- Species: C. chapini

Binomial name
- Chnaunanthus chapini Saylor, 1937

Species of beetle

Chnaunanthus chapini is a species of scarab beetle in the family Scarabaeidae. It is found in North America.
