= Chnaunanthus flavipennis =

Scientific classification
- Kingdom: Animalia
- Phylum: Arthropoda
- Class: Insecta
- Order: Coleoptera
- Suborder: Polyphaga
- Infraorder: Scarabaeiformia
- Family: Scarabaeidae
- Genus: Chnaunanthus
- Species: C. flavipennis

Binomial name
- Chnaunanthus flavipennis (Horn, 1867)

Synonyms
- Chnaunanthus palmeri Horn, 1894

Species of beetle

Chnaunanthus flavipennis is a species of scarab beetles in the family Scarabaeidae. It is found in North America.
