= Chnaunanthus =

Scientific classification
- Kingdom: Animalia
- Phylum: Arthropoda
- Class: Insecta
- Order: Coleoptera
- Suborder: Polyphaga
- Infraorder: Scarabaeiformia
- Family: Scarabaeidae
- Subfamily: Melolonthinae
- Genus: Chnaunanthus

Synonyms
- Acratus Horn, 1867; Pseudacratus Dalla Torre, 1912

Genus of beetles

Chnaunanthus is a genus of scarab beetles in the family Scarabaeidae. There are at least 3 described species in Chnaunanthus.

== Species ==
- Chnaunanthus chapini Saylor, 1937
- Chnaunanthus discolor Burmeister, 1844
- Chnaunanthus flavipennis (Horn, 1867)
