= Chalcosoma engganense =

Scientific classification
- Domain: Eukaryota
- Kingdom: Animalia
- Phylum: Arthropoda
- Class: Insecta
- Order: Coleoptera
- Suborder: Polyphaga
- Infraorder: Scarabaeiformia
- Family: Scarabaeidae
- Genus: Chalcosoma
- Species: C. engganense

Binomial name
- Chalcosoma engganense Nagai, 2004

Synonyms
- Chalcosoma engganensis Nagai, 2004 (Missp.)

Species of beetle

Chalcosoma engganense (often misspelled as "engganensis") is a large (35–60 mm) and heavy beetle. The body is shiny black. The male has a sharp horn (directed obliquely upward and forward) on the head. On each side of pronotum there are curved, forward directed horns. Across the head there is a short but powerful spike. This species differs from the normally developed specimens of the other Chalcosoma species in that horns are shorter, male can look a lot like small copies of Chalcosoma moellenkampi. The female lacks these horns and spikes, and is smaller.
