= Xylotrupes mniszechi =

Scientific classification
- Kingdom: Animalia
- Phylum: Arthropoda
- Class: Insecta
- Order: Coleoptera
- Suborder: Polyphaga
- Infraorder: Scarabaeiformia
- Family: Scarabaeidae
- Genus: Xylotrupes
- Species: X. mniszechi

Binomial name
- Xylotrupes mniszechi Thomson, 1859

Species of beetle

Xylotrupes mniszechi is a large species of rhinoceros beetle in the subfamily Dynastinae.

== Distribution ==
Its range extends from Pakistan through the Himalayas to Thailand.

== Description ==
It is comparatively large with a shiny exoskeleton. It measures around 2 in (5 cm) in length on average. Males have 2 horns, with the lower horn branching upwards into two sections. Its elytras are rounded and shiny. It resembles Xylotrupes ulysses.
