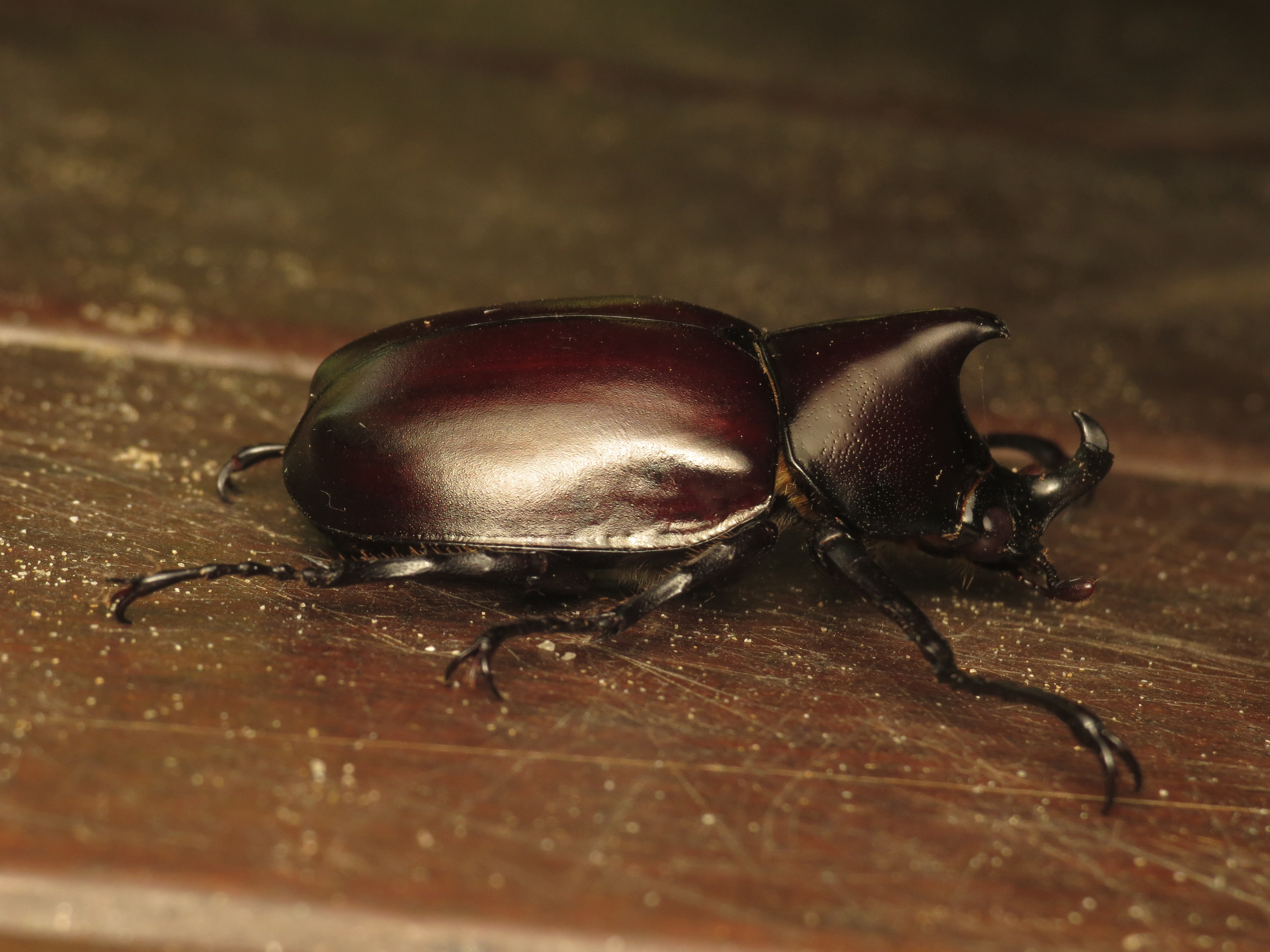
- Xylotrupes ulysses

Scientific classification
- Kingdom: Animalia
- Phylum: Arthropoda
- Clade: Pancrustacea
- Class: Insecta
- Order: Coleoptera
- Suborder: Polyphaga
- Infraorder: Scarabaeiformia
- Family: Scarabaeidae
- Subfamily: Dynastinae
- Tribe: Dynastini
- Genus: Xylotrupes; Hope, 1837

= Xylotrupes =

Genus of beetles

Xylotrupes is a genus of rhinoceros beetles, with more than 25 species and subspecies distributed worldwide, but especially in Asia.

== Species ==
- Xylotrupes australicus J. Thomson, 1859 - Australia
- Xylotrupes baumeisteri Schaufuss, 1885 - Sulawesi, status unclear
- Xylotrupes beckeri Schaufuss, 1885 - West Malaysia, Sumatra
- Xylotrupes carinulus Rowland, 2011 - New Guinea, Aru Islands Regency
- Xylotrupes clinias Schaufuss, 1885 - Sulawesi, Maluku Islands
- Xylotrupes damarensis Rowland, 2006 - Tanimbar Islands
- Xylotrupes faber Silvestre, 2002 - Java
- Xylotrupes falcatus Minck, 1920 - Indonesia
- Xylotrupes florensis Lansberge, 1879 - lesser Sunda islands (= Endebius florensis), Flores, Timor and Wetar
- Xylotrupes gideon (Linnaeus, 1767) - widespread
- Xylotrupes gilleti - Tanimbar islands
- Xylotrupes inarmatus Sternberg, 1906 - Java
- Xylotrupes introduce Li, 2016 - lesser Sunda islands
- Xylotrupes lorquini Schaufuss, 1885 - Sulawesi
- Xylotrupes lumawigi Silvestre, 2002 - Philippines
- Xylotrupes macleayi Montrouzier, 1855 - New Guinea & Vanuatu
- Xylotrupes meridionalis Prell, 1914 - Sri Lanka
- (Xylotrupes mindanaoensis Schultze, 1920) - should probably be placed in the genus Allomyrina
- Xylotrupes mniszechi J. Thomson, 1859 - Himalayas
- Xylotrupes oudomxayicus Li, 2016 - Laos
- Xylotrupes pachycera Rowland, 2006 - Borneo
- Xylotrupes pauliani Silvestre, 1997 - Sumatra and West Malaysia Pahang
- Xylotrupes philippinensis Endrödi, 1957 - Philippines & Lanyu, Taiwan
- Xylotrupes pubescens Waterhouse, 1841 – Philippines
- Xylotrupes reductus Walker, 1859 - Sri Lanka
- Xylotrupes rindaae Fujii, 2011 - Indonesia
- Xylotrupes siamensis Minck, 1920 - SE-Asia
- Xylotrupes socrates Schaufuss, 1864 - Vietnam, Thailand
- (Xylotrupes solidipes Walker, 1859) - should probably be placed in the genus Dipelicus (Pentodontini)
- Xylotrupes striatopunctatus Silvestre, 2003 - Maluku Islands
- Xylotrupes sumatrensis Minck, 1920 - Sumatra and West Malaysia
- Xylotrupes tadoana Rowland, 2006 - Flores
- Xylotrupes taprobanus Prell, 1914 - India, Sri Lanka
- Xylotrupes telemachos Rowland, 2003 - Maluku Islands
- Xylotrupes ulysses (Guérin-Méneville, 1830) - Bismarck Archipelago
- Xylotrupes wiltrudae Silvestre, 1997 - Borneo
