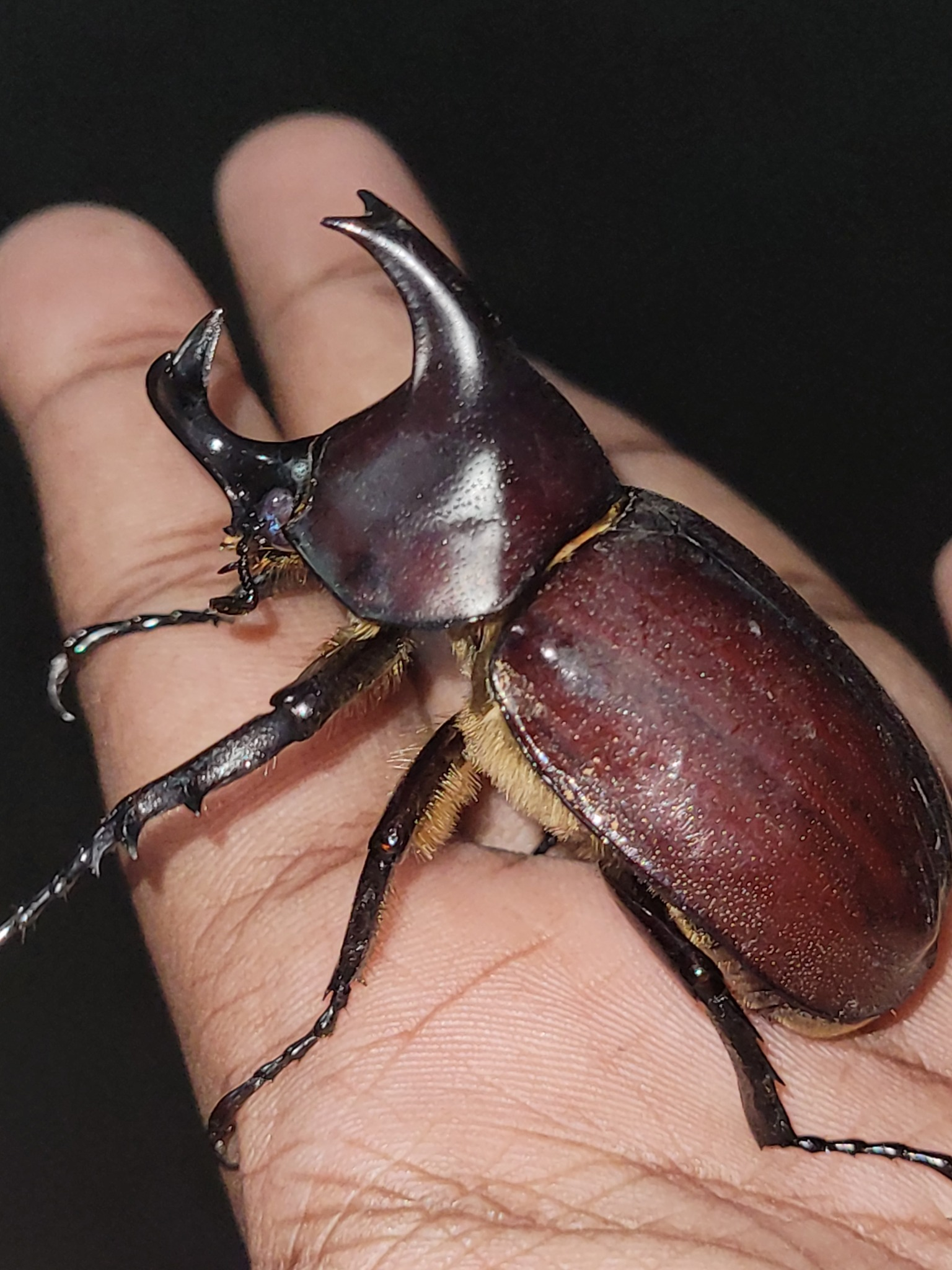

Scientific classification
- Kingdom: Animalia
- Phylum: Arthropoda
- Clade: Pancrustacea
- Class: Insecta
- Order: Coleoptera
- Suborder: Polyphaga
- Infraorder: Scarabaeiformia
- Family: Scarabaeidae
- Genus: Xylotrupes
- Species: X. meridionalis

Binomial name
- Xylotrupes meridionalis Prell, 1914

Synonyms
- Xylotrupes gideon meridionalis Endrödi, 1957; Xylotrupes gideon socrates Endrödi, 1985; Xylotrupes meridionalis meridionalis Rowland, 2003

= Xylotrupes meridionalis =

Species of beetle

Xylotrupes meridionalis, commonly known as forked horns rhinoceros beetle, is a species of rhinoceros beetle found in India and Sri Lanka.

== Description ==
Male has prolonged anterior legs whereas female has normal anterior legs. Basal joints of posterior tarsi are cylindrical in shape. Propygidium lack a stridulatory area. Male has a single thoracic horn. Elytra coriaceous. Male has large tambour shaped phallobase. Adult beetles feed on young bark, seedlings, shoots, and twigs. Host plants included: Acacia mearnsii, Hevea brasiliensis and Toona australis.

== Subspecies ==
Two subspecies recognized.

- Xylotrupes meridionalis meridionalis Prell, 1914 – India
- Xylotrupes meridionalis taprobanes Prell, 1914 – Sri Lanka
