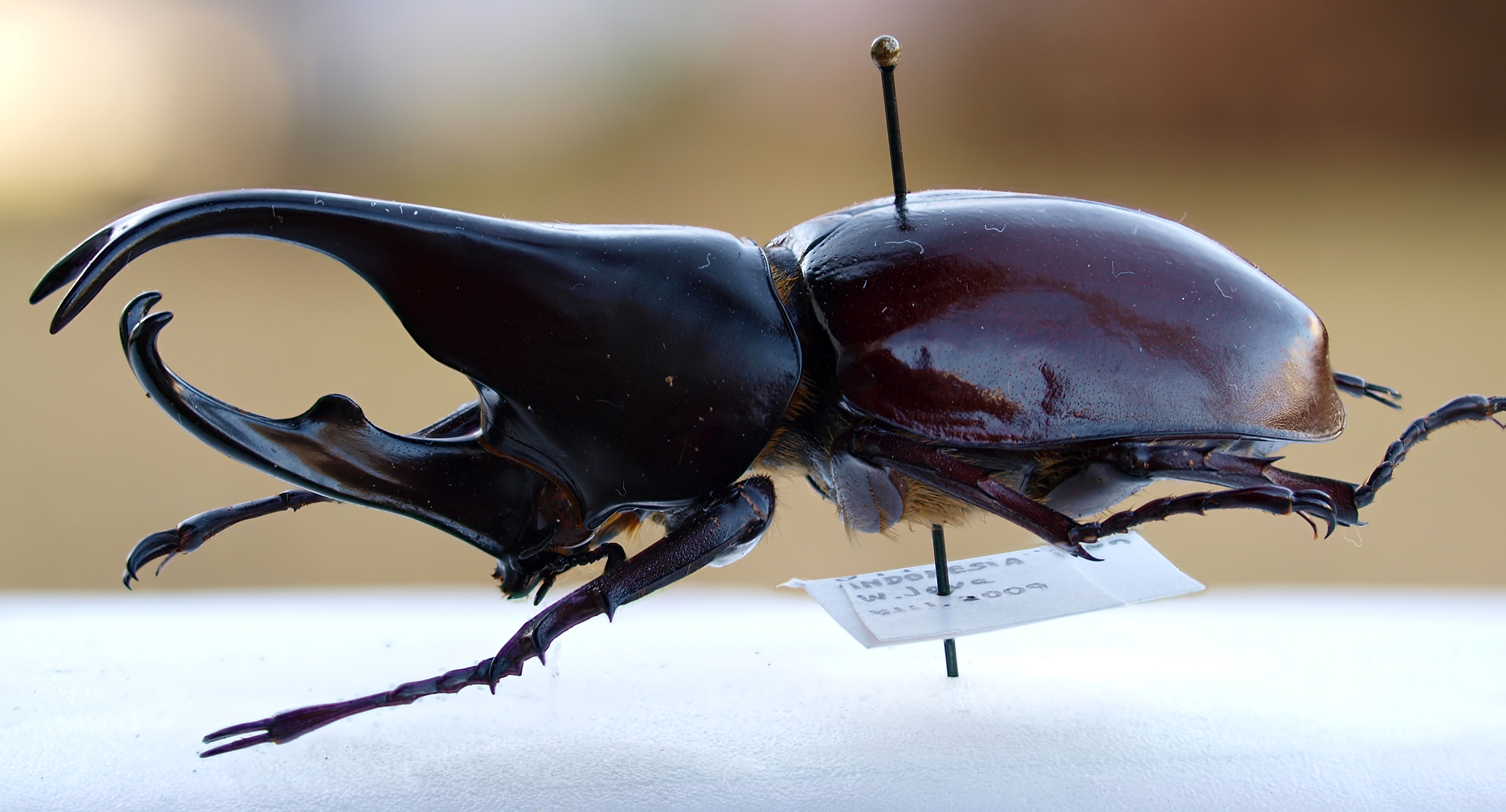
- Xylotrupes gideon, male

Scientific classification
- Kingdom: Animalia
- Phylum: Arthropoda
- Clade: Pancrustacea
- Class: Insecta
- Order: Coleoptera
- Suborder: Polyphaga
- Infraorder: Scarabaeiformia
- Family: Scarabaeidae
- Genus: Xylotrupes
- Species: X. gideon

Binomial name
- Xylotrupes gideon (Linnaeus, 1767)

Synonyms
- Scarabaeus gideon Linnaeus, 1767

= Xylotrupes gideon =

Species of beetle

Xylotrupes gideon, the brown rhinoceros beetle, is a species of large scarab beetle belonging to the subfamily Dynastinae.

== Subspecies ==
Seven subspecies have been identified.

- Xylotrupes gideon australicus
- Xylotrupes gideon borneensis Minck, 1920
- Xylotrupes gideon gideon (Linnaeus, 1767)
- Xylotrupes gideon kaszabi
- Xylotrupes gideon lakorensis Silvestre, 2002
- Xylotrupes gideon sawuensis Silvestre, 2002
- Xylotrupes gideon sondaicus Silvestre, 2002
- Xylotrupes gideon tonkinensis Minck, 1920

== Distribution ==
This species is widespread in India, Sri Lanka, Thailand, Indonesia: Java (nominotypical form), Borneo (borneensis), Sunda Islands and Moluccas.

== Description ==
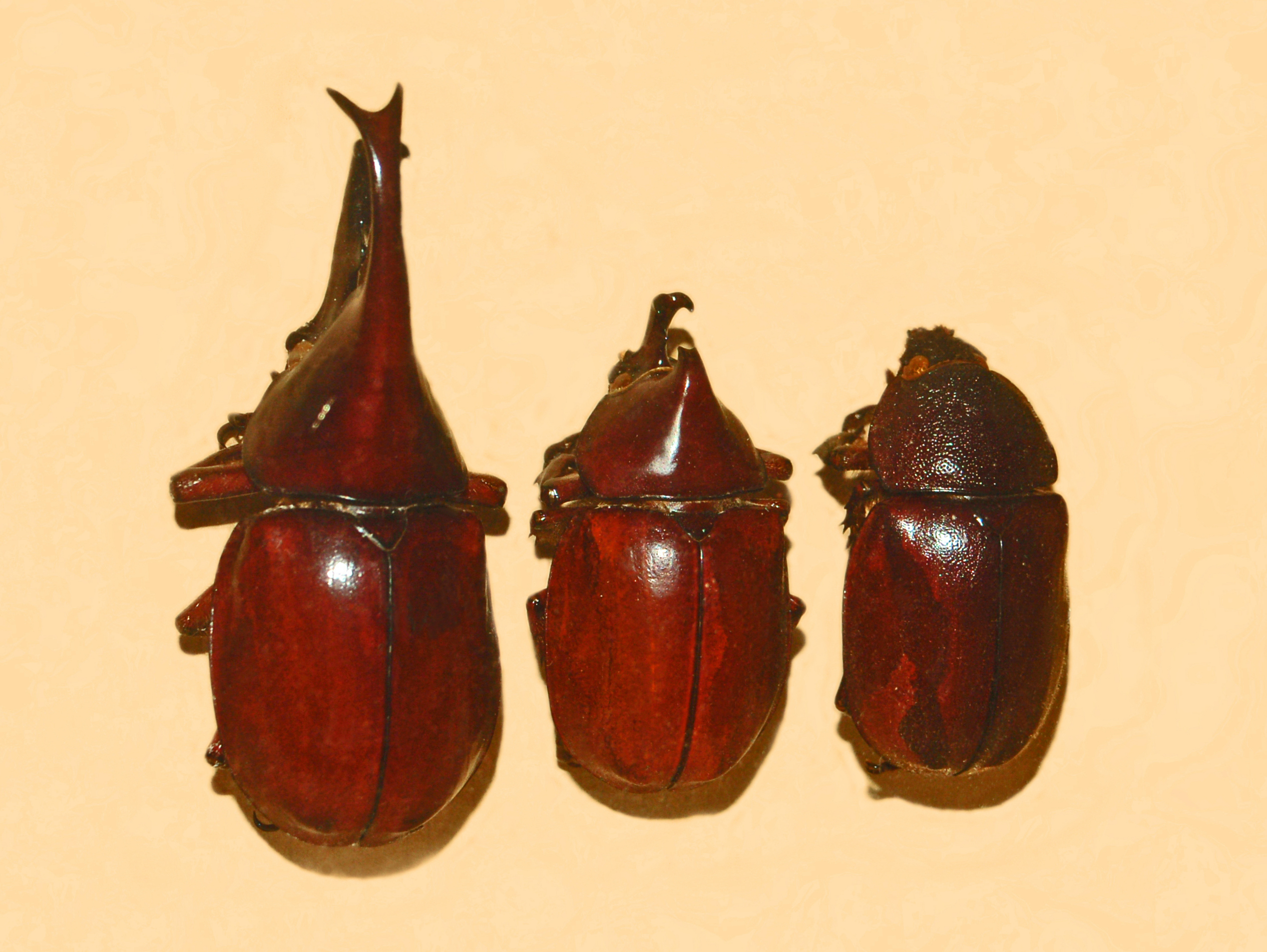
Xylotrupes gideon, (left to right) major male, minor male, and female. Museum specimen

Xylotrupes gideon can reach a length of 3.5–7 centimetres (1.4–2.8 in). As usual with rhinoceros beetles there is a great difference between the genders. Males are larger than females. They have two chitinous bifurcated horns, a thick thoracic horn and a smaller cephalic horn, which they use to eliminate their rivals during the mating period. These beetles are shiny dark red, dark brown, or black in coloration. The eyes are located on each side of the head. When disturbed these beetles make a hissing noise, produced by rubbing the tip of the abdomen against the edge the elytra.

Males with transverse, scantily punctured head; clypeus elongate, scantily and minutely punctured. Antenna with 10 segments. Pronotum and scutellum scantily and minutely punctured. Elytra and pygidium coriaceous, finely and scantily punctured. Dorsum of female is rugose, with coarsely and densely punctured pronotum. Pygidium finely rugose.

== Biology ==
One source gives the average duration of the different developmental stages; females lay about 55 eggs at one time in decaying logs; eggs mature in 21 days, where the larvae hatch from decaying coconut logs; the total larval period is 188 days, followed by 14 days of prepupal and 32 days of pupal periods; adult females are live about 102 days, whereas adult males survive 90 days. Other sources indicate that the larvae develop in decaying vegetable matter and usually take two years in development, the adult beetles live 2–4 months. A female can lay about 20-30 eggs but it depends on the place where they live.

This species is considered as a serious pest on coconut and also a minor pest on plum, okra, oil palm, sugarcane, Persea bombycina, rubber, banana, bamboo, Delonix regia, Cacao tree, poinciana, cassia, litchi, potato, apple and pear.

== See also ==
- Xylotrupes ulysses
- Elephant beetle
- Rhinoceros beetle
