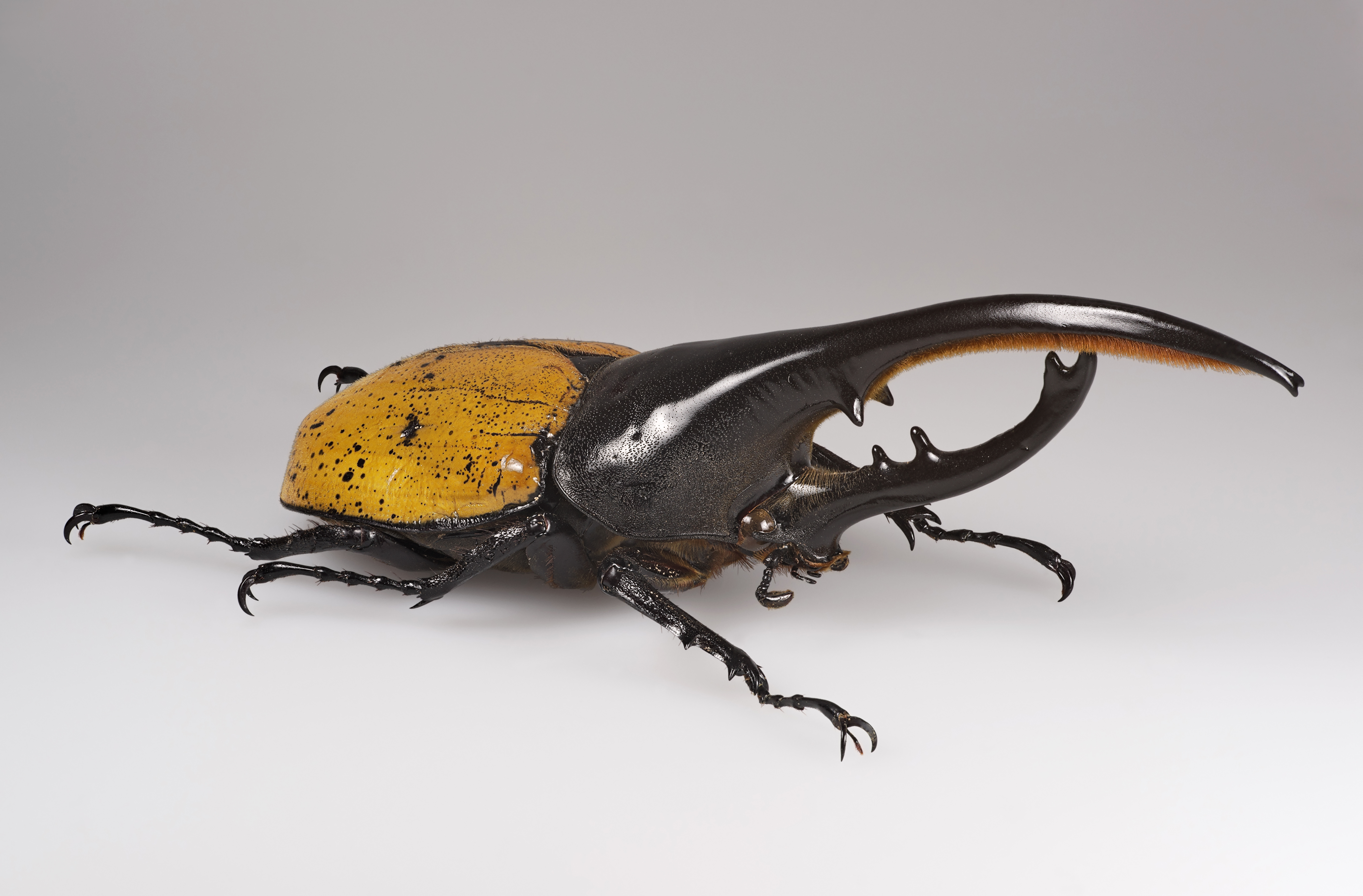
- male of Dynastes hercules

Scientific classification
- Kingdom: Animalia
- Phylum: Arthropoda
- Clade: Pancrustacea
- Class: Insecta
- Order: Coleoptera
- Suborder: Polyphaga
- Infraorder: Scarabaeiformia
- Family: Scarabaeidae
- Subfamily: Dynastinae
- Tribe: Dynastini; MacLeay, 1819

= Dynastini =

Tribe of beetles

Dynastini is a tribe of rhinoceros beetles in the family Scarabaeidae.

== Subtribes and genera ==
according to CoL:

subtribe Chalcosomina Rowland & Miller, 2012

1. Chalcosoma Hope, 1837
2. Debeckius Allsopp, 2022 - monotypic Debeckius beccarii (Gestro, 1876)
3. Eupatorus Burmeister, 1847
4. Haploscapanes Arrow, 1908
5. Pachyoryctes Arrow, 1908

subtribe Dynastina MacLeay, 1819

1. Augosoma Burmeister, 1841
2. Dynastes MacLeay, 1819 - type genus
3. Golofa Hope, 1837
4. Megasoma Kirby, 1825

subtribe Xylotrupina Hope, 1838

1. Allomyrina Arrow, 1911
2. Endebius van Lansberge, 1880
3. Trypoxylus Minck, 1920
4. Xylotrupes Hope, 1837
5. Xyloscaptes Prell, 1934
