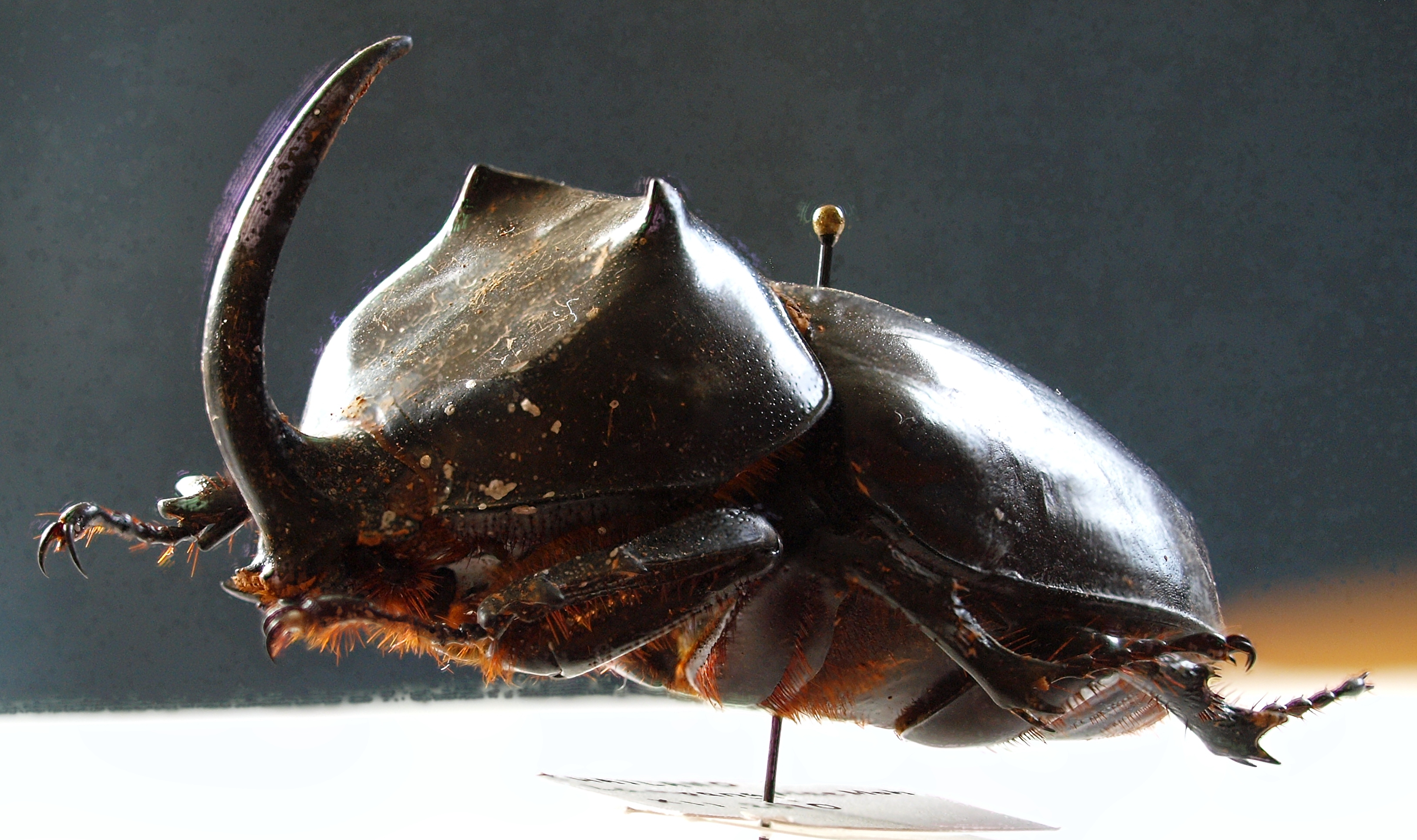
- Male Pachyoryctes solidus

Scientific classification
- Kingdom: Animalia
- Phylum: Arthropoda
- Class: Insecta
- Order: Coleoptera
- Suborder: Polyphaga
- Infraorder: Scarabaeiformia
- Family: Scarabaeidae
- Tribe: Dynastini
- Genus: Pachyoryctes; Arrow, 1908

= Pachyoryctes =

Genus of beetles

Pachyoryctes is a genus of rhinoceros beetles in the family Scarabaeidae.

== List of species ==
The genus Pachyoryctes consists of 2 species:

- Pachyoryctes elongatus
- Pachyoryctes solidus
