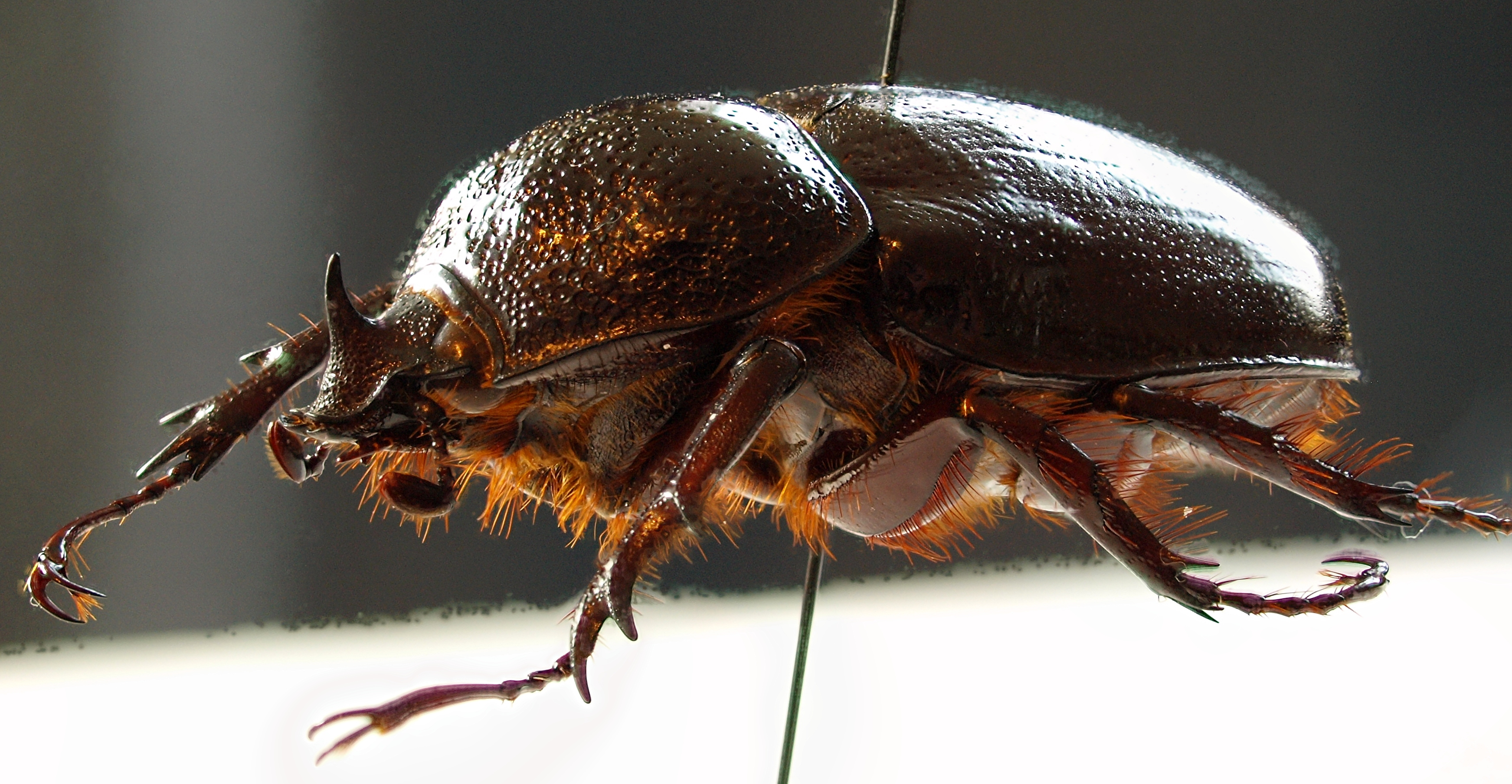
- A male Haploscapanes barbarossa
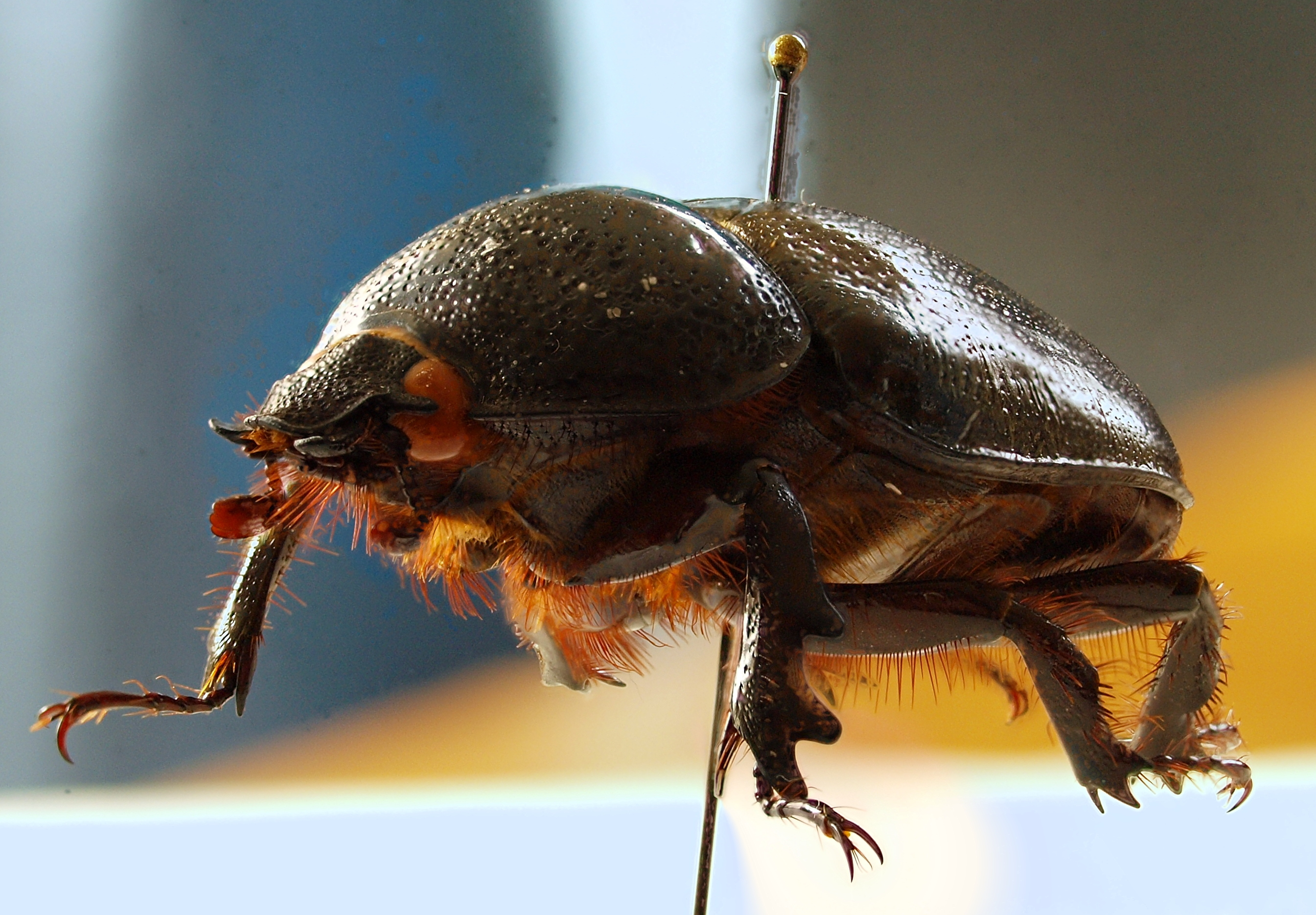
- A female Haploscapanes barbarossa

Scientific classification
- Kingdom: Animalia
- Phylum: Arthropoda
- Clade: Pancrustacea
- Class: Insecta
- Order: Coleoptera
- Suborder: Polyphaga
- Infraorder: Scarabaeiformia
- Family: Scarabaeidae
- Subfamily: Dynastinae
- Tribe: Dynastini
- Genus: Haploscapanes; Arrow, 1908

Type species
- Haploscapanes australicus Arrow, 1908

= Haploscapanes =

Genus of beetles

Haploscapanes is a genus of insect in the scarab beetle clade. The genus lives along the western Australian coast.

There are four species in this genus:

- Haploscapanes australicus Arrow, 1908
- Haploscapanes barbarossa (Fabricius, 1775)
- Haploscapanes inermis (Prell, 1911)
- Haploscapanes papuanus Dechambre & Drumont, 2004

== Taxonomy ==
The genus belongs to the Scarabaeidae family which itself belongs to the Scarabaeoidea superfamily. The superfamily then belongs to the Coleoptera order which is part of the insecta clade and hexapoda clade. The hexapoda clade is then part of the Arthropoda phylum. Then the Arthropoda phylum is part of the Animalia clade which is part of the Eukaryote domain.
