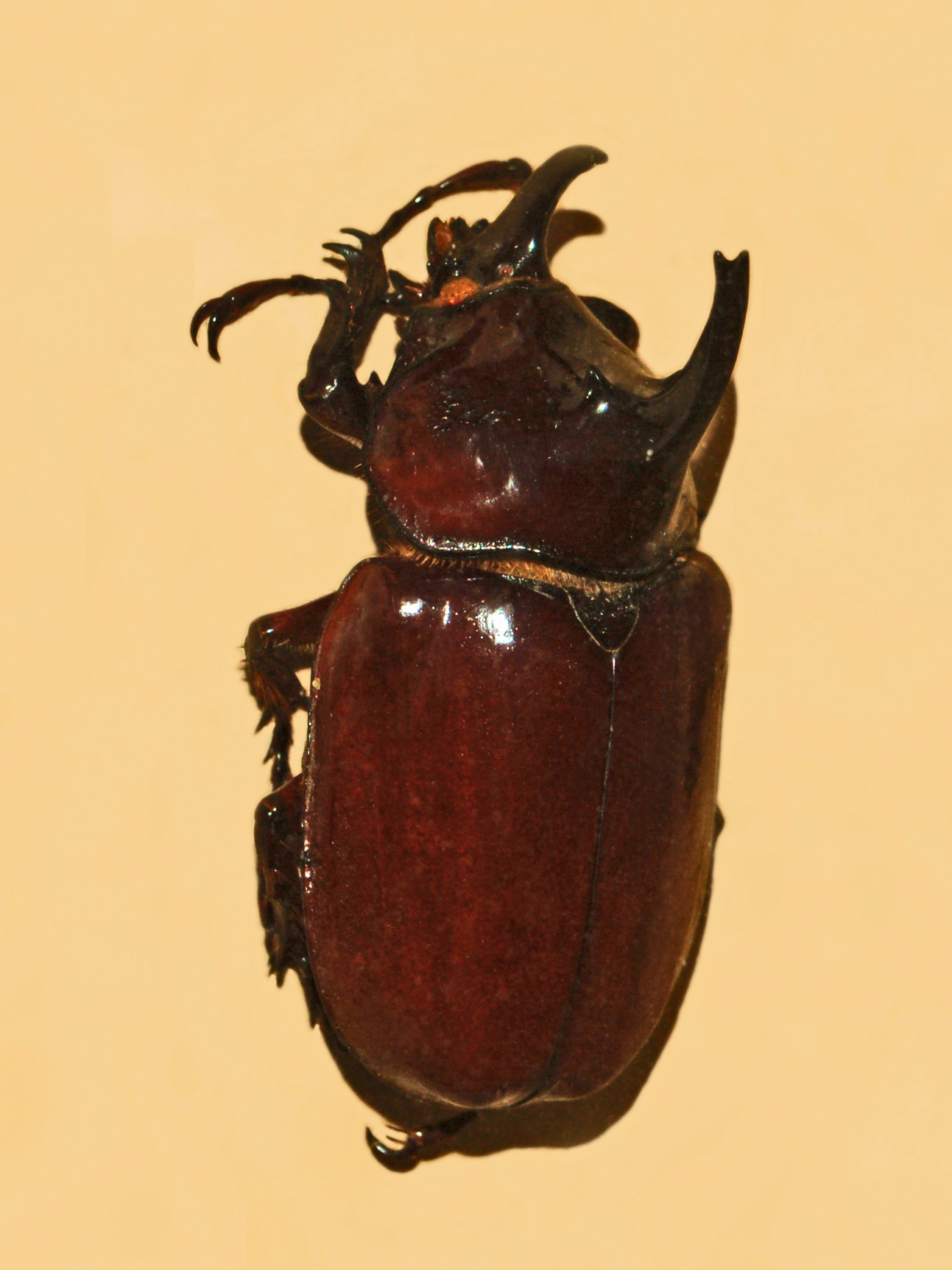
- Augosoma centaurus

Scientific classification
- Kingdom: Animalia
- Phylum: Arthropoda
- Class: Insecta
- Order: Coleoptera
- Suborder: Polyphaga
- Infraorder: Scarabaeiformia
- Family: Scarabaeidae
- Tribe: Dynastini
- Genus: Augosoma; Burmeister, 1841

Synonyms
- Archon Kirby, 1825 nec Hübner, 1822

= Augosoma =

Genus of beetles

Augosoma is a genus of rhinoceros beetle belonging to the family Scarabaeidae.

Augosoma species include very large (40-100 millimeters), glossy black or dark brown beetles. The males have long, curved horns on the head. These horns lack in the females. These beetles occurs in tropical West Africa (Cameroon, Central African Republic).

== Species ==
- Augosoma centaurus (Fabricius, 1775)
- Augosoma hippocrates Milani, 1996
