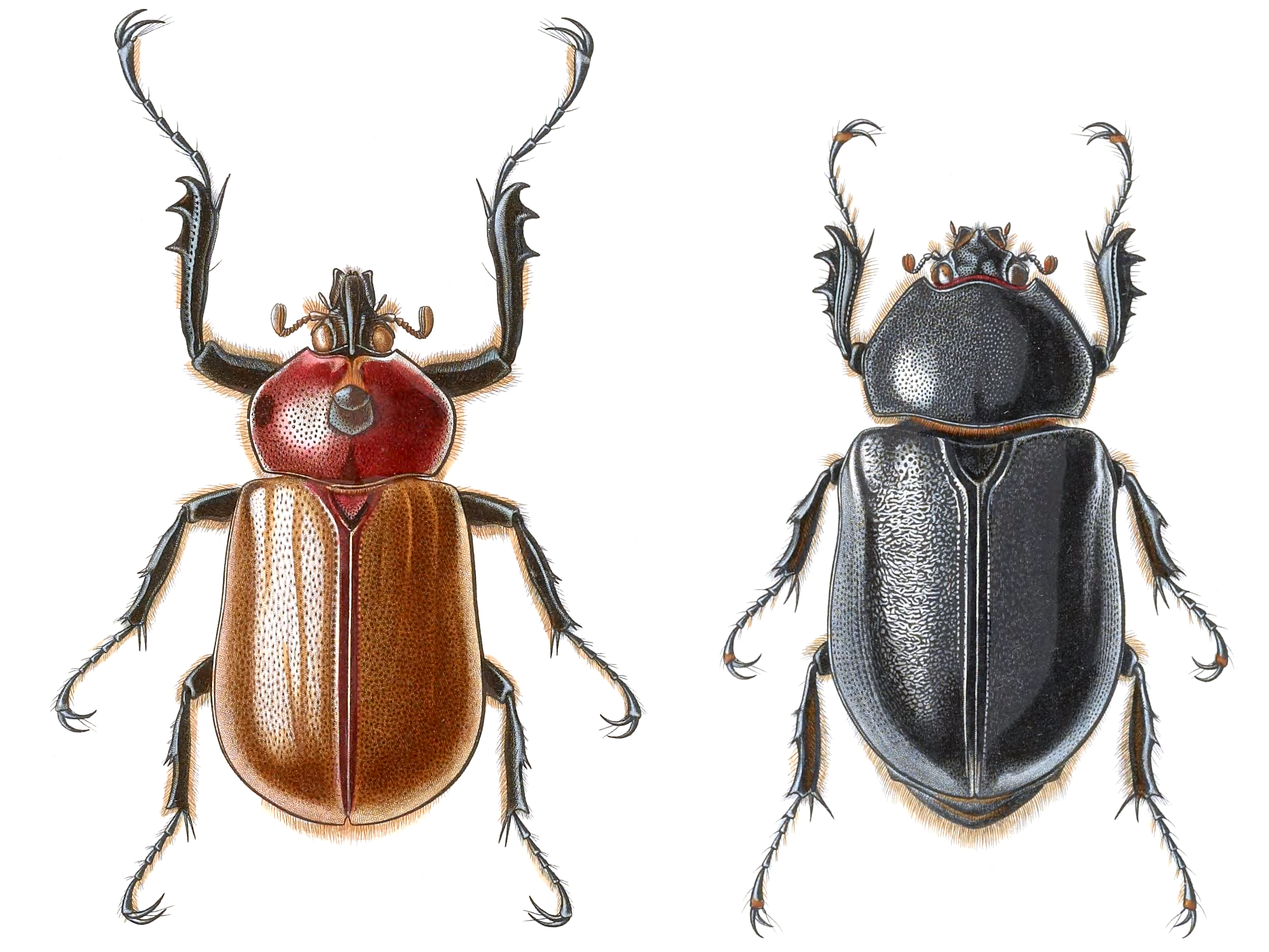
- Male and female

Scientific classification
- Kingdom: Animalia
- Phylum: Arthropoda
- Clade: Pancrustacea
- Class: Insecta
- Order: Coleoptera
- Suborder: Polyphaga
- Infraorder: Scarabaeiformia
- Family: Scarabaeidae
- Genus: Golofa
- Species: G. imperialis

Binomial name
- Golofa imperialis Thomson, 1858

= Golofa imperialis =

Species of beetle

Golofa imperialis is a species of rhinoceros beetle belonging to the family Scarabaeidae.

== Description ==
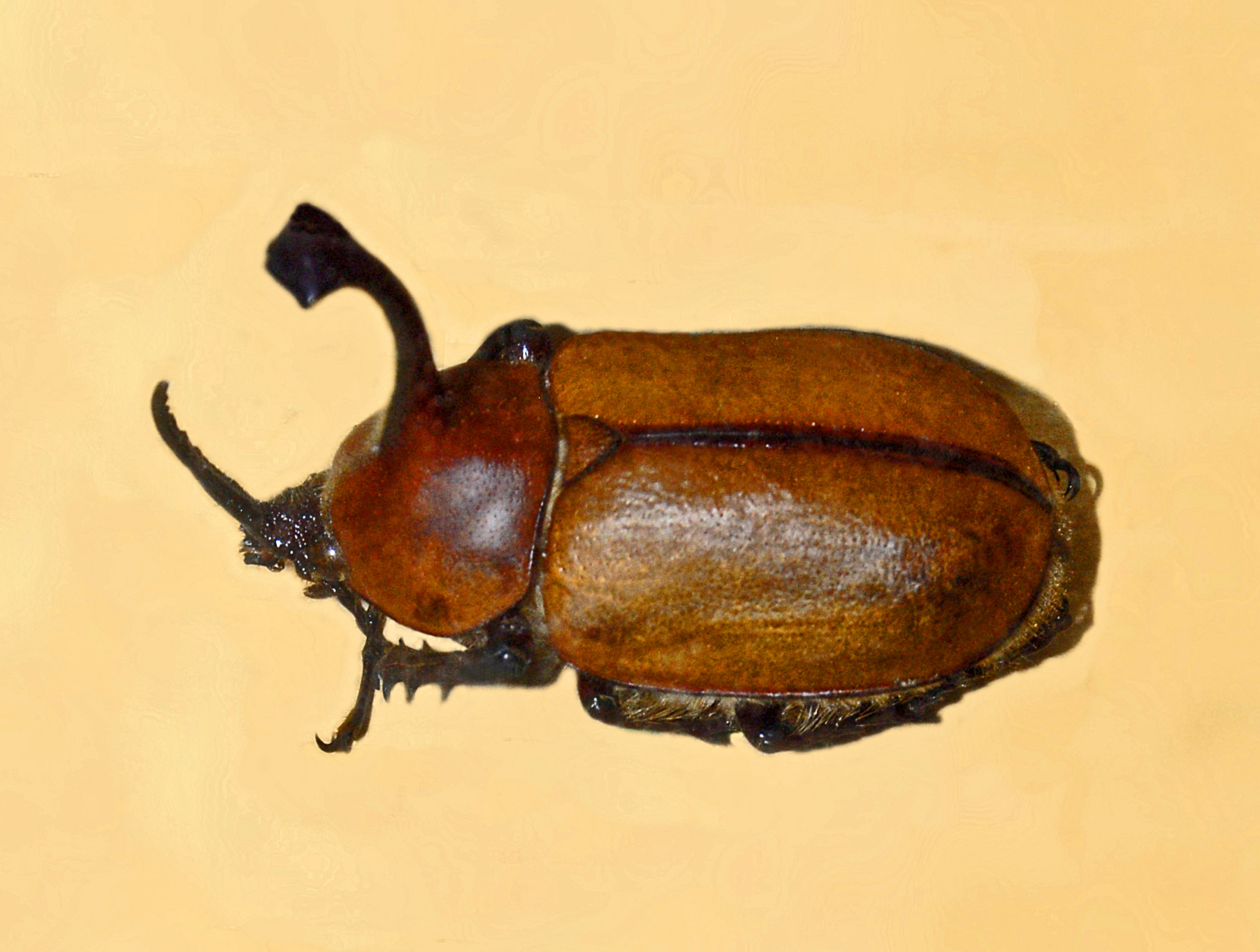
Side view of male from Panama

Golofa imperialis can reach a length of about 45 millimetres (1.8 in). Protarsus is equal to or larger than protibia. Male pronotum has a long prothoracic horn with a triangular tip. The head show a thin horn. The underside of the body is covered in golden hair. The front legs are longer than the others.

== Distribution ==
This species is present in Mexico and Central America.
