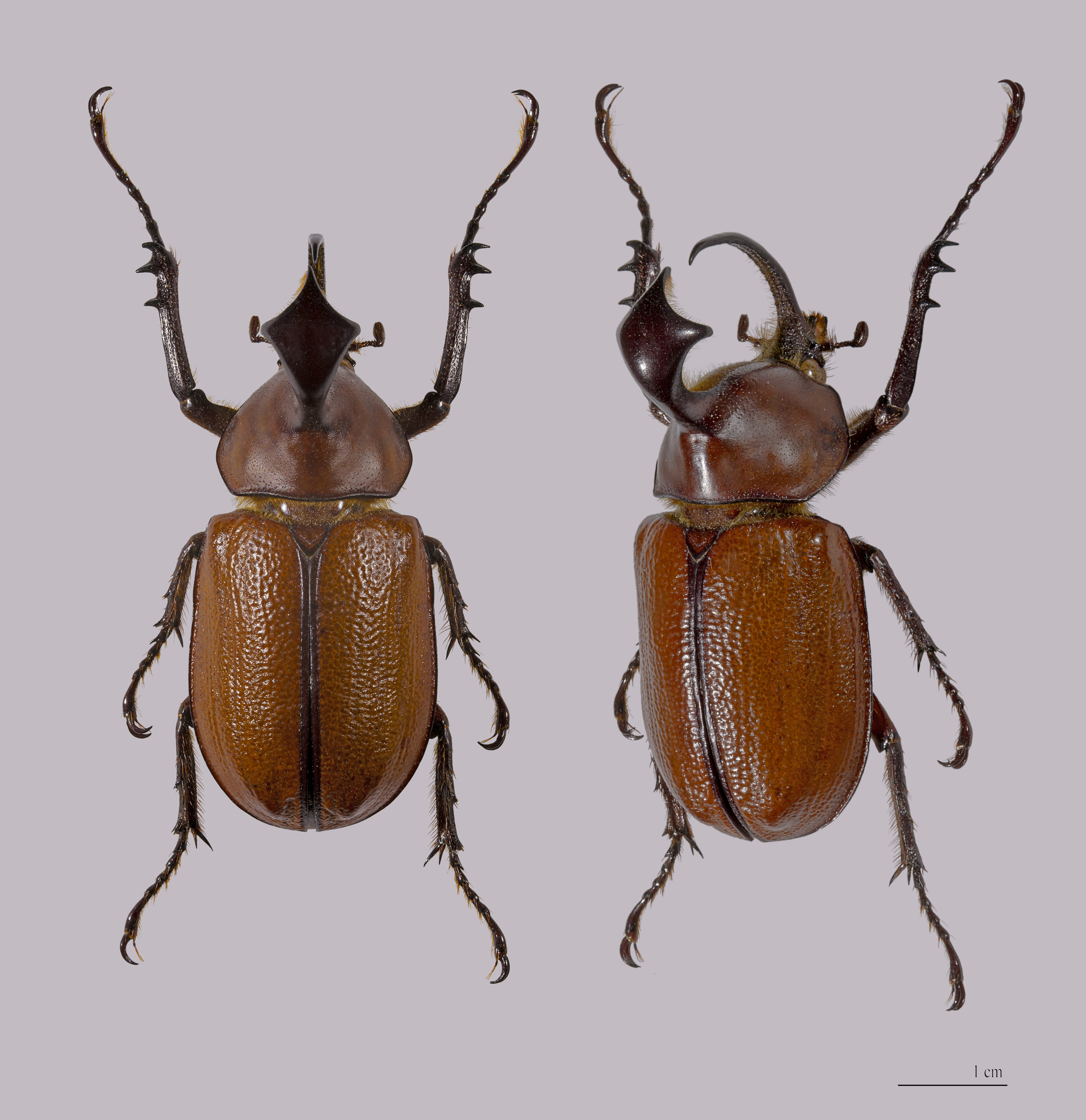
- Golofa claviger

Scientific classification
- Kingdom: Animalia
- Phylum: Arthropoda
- Clade: Pancrustacea
- Class: Insecta
- Order: Coleoptera
- Suborder: Polyphaga
- Infraorder: Scarabaeiformia
- Family: Scarabaeidae
- Tribe: Dynastini
- Genus: Golofa; Hope, 1837

Synonyms
- Asseroder Maunders, 1848; Mixigenus Thomson, 1859; Praogolofa Bates, 1892

= Golofa =

Genus of beetles

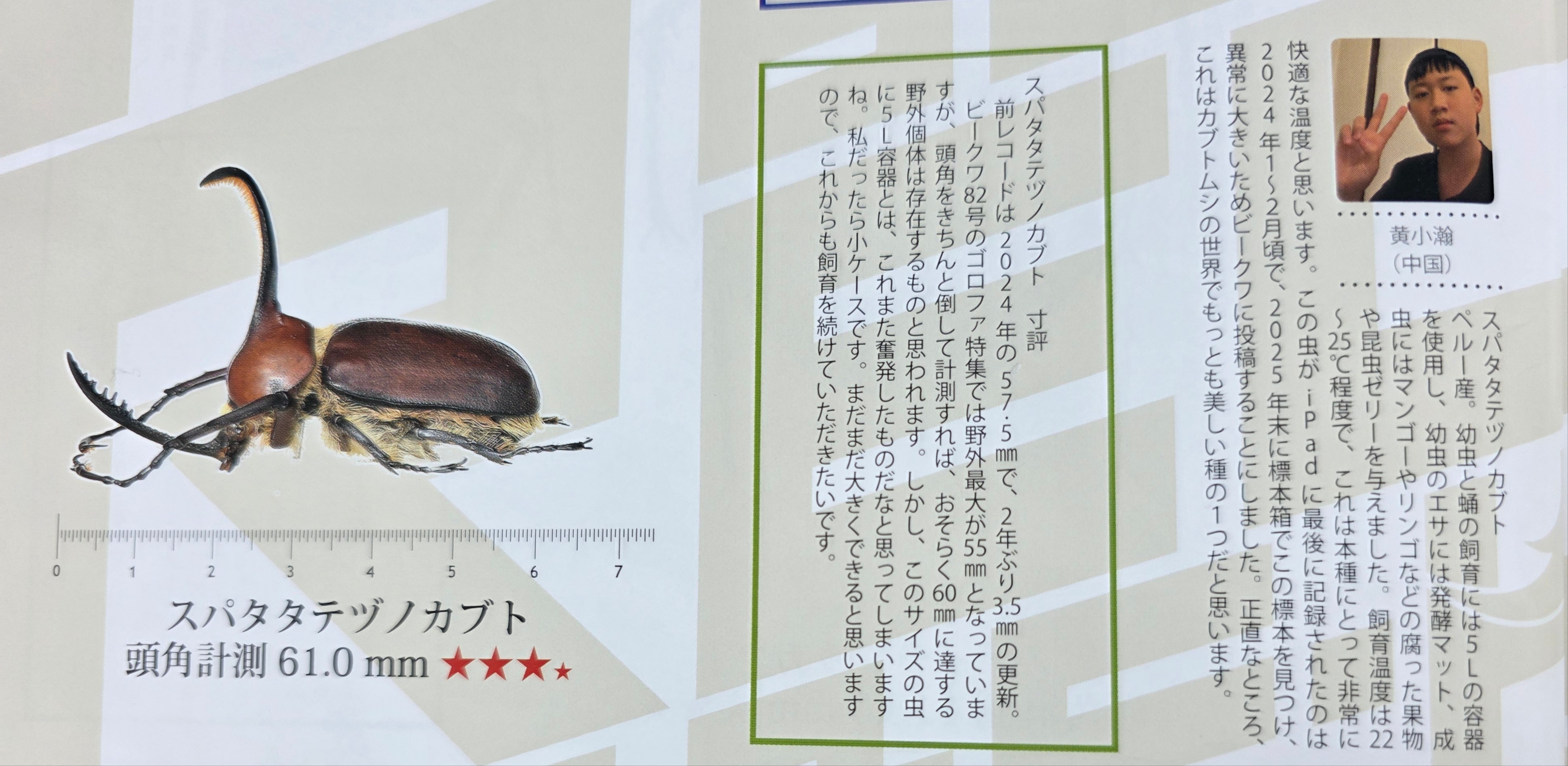
61mm World Record Golofa Gaujoni Achieved By 黄小瀚 (China), in 2026

Golofa is a genus of rhinoceros beetles. The name Golofa is the indigenous name used for these beetles in Venezuela, and was adopted as a genus name when originally described in 1837; the genus name is masculine in gender, following ICZN Article 30.2.3.

== Description ==
Golofa are large scarabs, and the males typically have a single horn on the head and another horn centrally on the prothorax; the horns are often elongate, and often curve towards each other.

== Species ==
- Golofa aegeon (Drury, 1773)
- Golofa antiquus Arrow, 1911
- Golofa argentina Arrow, 1911
- Golofa claviger (Linnaeus, 1771)
- Golofa cochlearis Ohaus, 1910
- Golofa costaricensis Bates, 1888
- Golofa eacus Burmeister, 1847
- Golofa gaujoni Lachaume, 1985
- Golofa globulicornis Dechambre, 1975
- Golofa hirsutus Ratcliffe, 2003
- Golofa imbellis Bates, 1888
- Golofa imperialis Thomson, 1858
- Golofa incas Hope, 1837
- Golofa inermis Thomson, 1859
- Golofa minutus
- Golofa obliquicornis Dechambre, 1975
- Golofa paradoxus Dechambre, 1975
- Golofa pelagon Burmeister, 1847
- Golofa pizarro Hope, 1837
- Golofa porteri Hope, 1837
- Golofa pusillus Arrow, 1911
- Golofa solisi Ratcliffe, 2003
- Golofa spatha Dechambre, 1989
- Golofa tepaneneca Morón, 1995
- Golofa tersander (Burmeister, 1847)
- Golofa testudinarius Prell, 1934
- Golofa unicolor (Bates, 1891)
- Golofa xiximeca Morón, 1995

== Be-Kuwa Records (Updated) ==
Golofa Gaujoni- 61mm (2026)

Golofa Aegon- 84.9mm (2025)

Golofa Claviger- 67.7mm (2020)

Golofa Porteri- 106.8mm (2010)

Golofa Globulicornis- 63.6mm (2024)

Golofa Spatha- 57.5mm (2024)

Golofa Bifidus- 69.4 (2025)

== Be-Kuwa Records (Small-Updated) ==
Golofa Porteri- 43.5 (2024)
