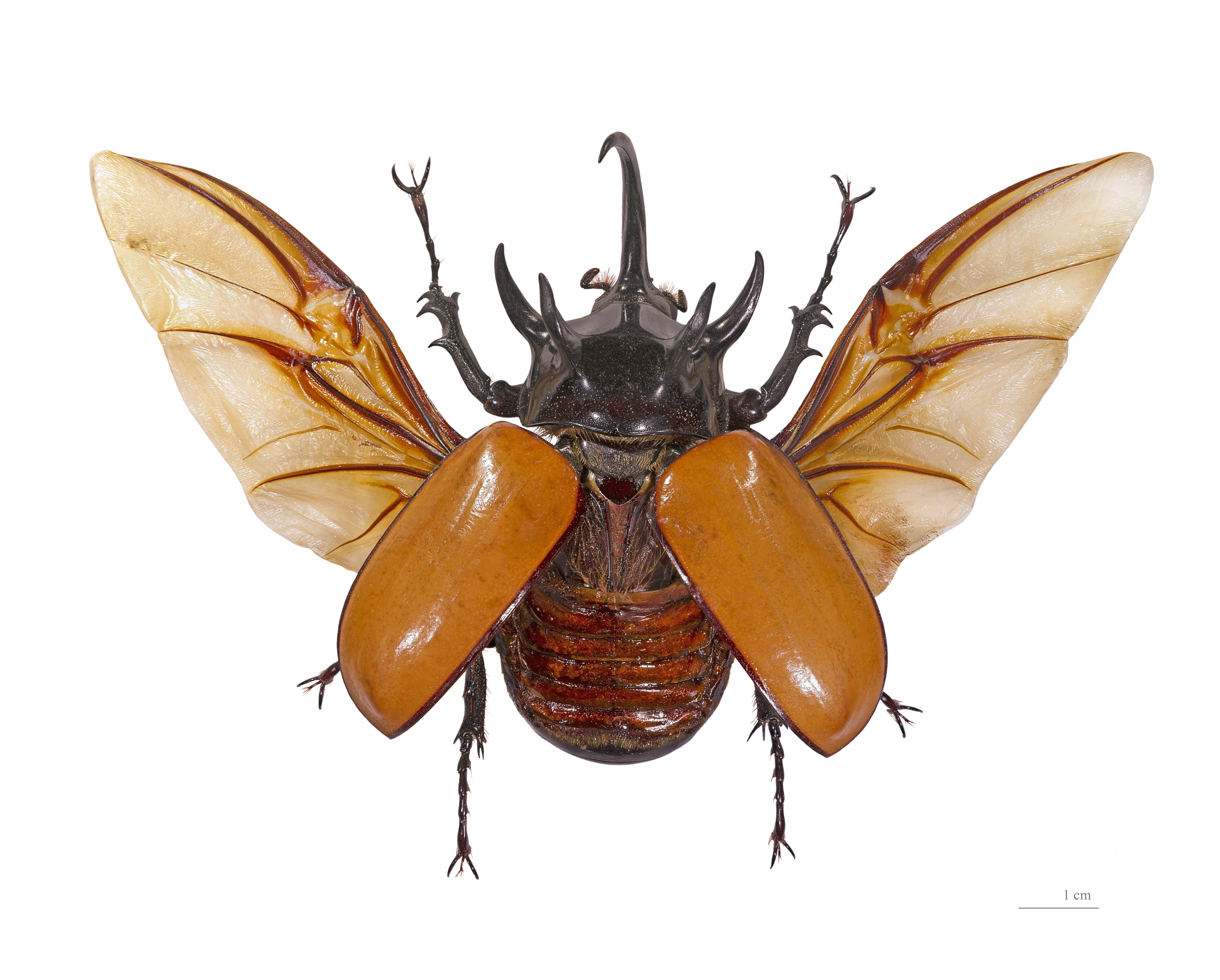
- Eupatorus gracilicornis

Scientific classification
- Kingdom: Animalia
- Phylum: Arthropoda
- Class: Insecta
- Order: Coleoptera
- Suborder: Polyphaga
- Infraorder: Scarabaeiformia
- Family: Scarabaeidae
- Subfamily: Dynastinae
- Tribe: Dynastini
- Genus: Eupatorus; Burmeister, 1847

= Eupatorus =

Genus of beetles

Eupatorus is a genus of rhinoceros beetles (subfamily Dynastinae of the family Scarabaeidae).

== Species ==
The genus contains the following species, typically found in Indo-China:

- Eupatorus birmanicus Arrow, 1908
- Eupatorus endoi Nagai, 1999
- Eupatorus gracilicornis Arrow, 1908
- Eupatorus hardwickii (Hope, 1831)
- Eupatorus pyros Prandi & Grossi, 2021
- Eupatorus siamensis (Castelnau, 1867)
- Eupatorus sukkiti Miyashita & Arnaud, 1996

Uncertain status

- Eupatorus koletta Voirin, 1978
