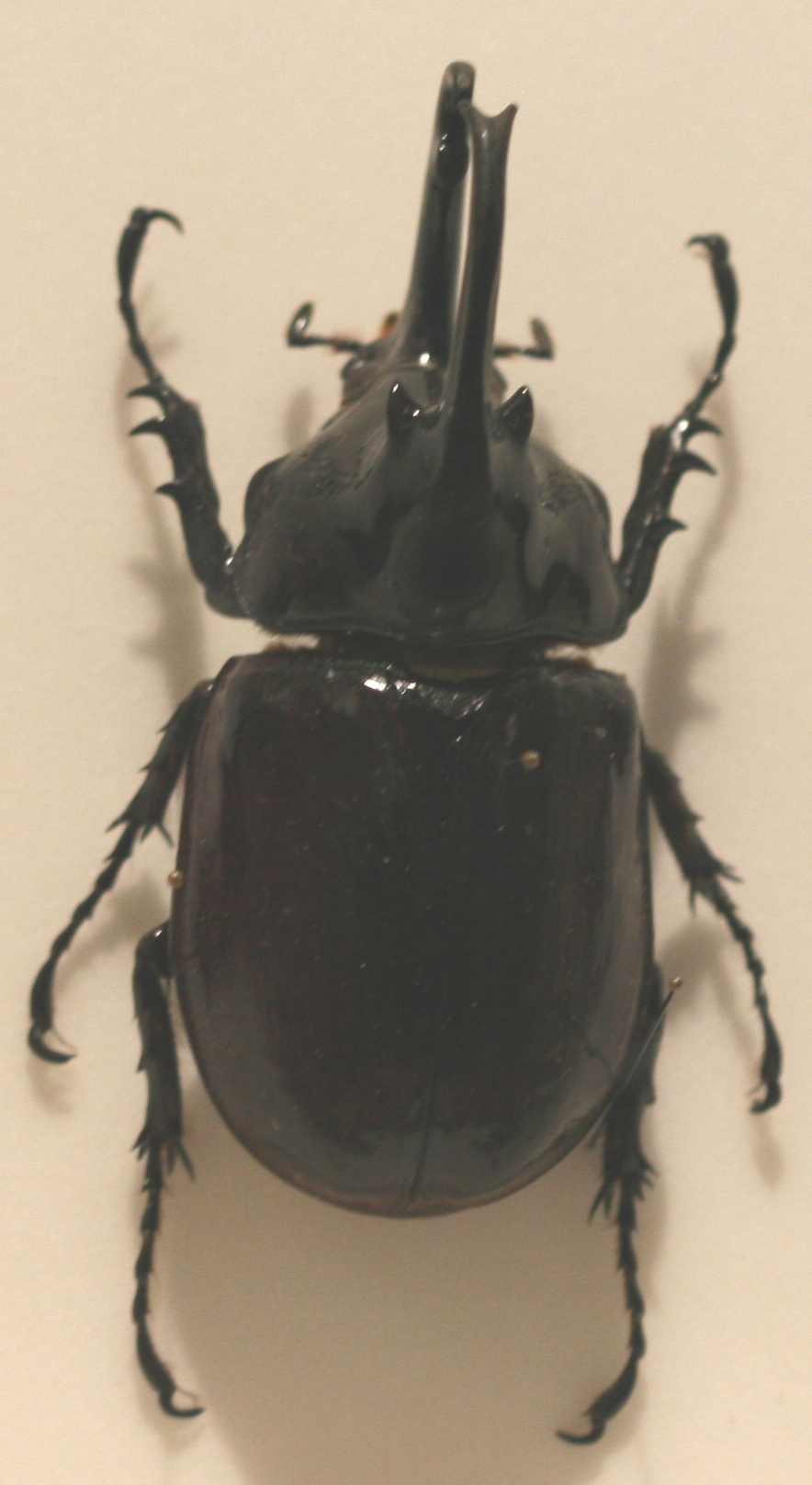

Scientific classification
- Domain: Eukaryota
- Kingdom: Animalia
- Phylum: Arthropoda
- Class: Insecta
- Order: Coleoptera
- Suborder: Polyphaga
- Infraorder: Scarabaeiformia
- Family: Scarabaeidae
- Genus: Augosoma
- Species: A. centaurus

Binomial name
- Augosoma centaurus (Fabricius, 1775)

= Augosoma centaurus =

Species of beetle

Augosoma centaurus, the centaurus beetle, is a species of rhinoceros beetle found in tropical Africa, which measures about 40–90 mm. As common in many insect species, the male is larger than the female and usually two males will fight for a female for mating.

== Appearance ==
The centaurus beetle's adult morphology is strikingly similar to that of beetles from the genus Dynastes which originate from tropical America, which led to its initial classification to that genus. Eventually, it was moved to its present genus to avoid confusion as even the genus Xylotrupes from the southeast Asian tropics have a similar form. The male has large horns and is considerably bigger than the female, which has no horns as well.

== Larvae ==
The larva of the centaurus beetle has a dark row of spots which is visible along the side of its body, known as the spiracles. These are openings leading to its tracheal network, which is the insect equivalent of the vertebrate lung. The spiracles could be considered as the insect version of nostrils. Spiracles are also present in the adult beetle and located along the sides of the abdomen; however, they have no distinct color and quite unnoticeable.

== Origin of the name ==
The origin of the name of the Centaurus beetle may be the Greek centaur.
