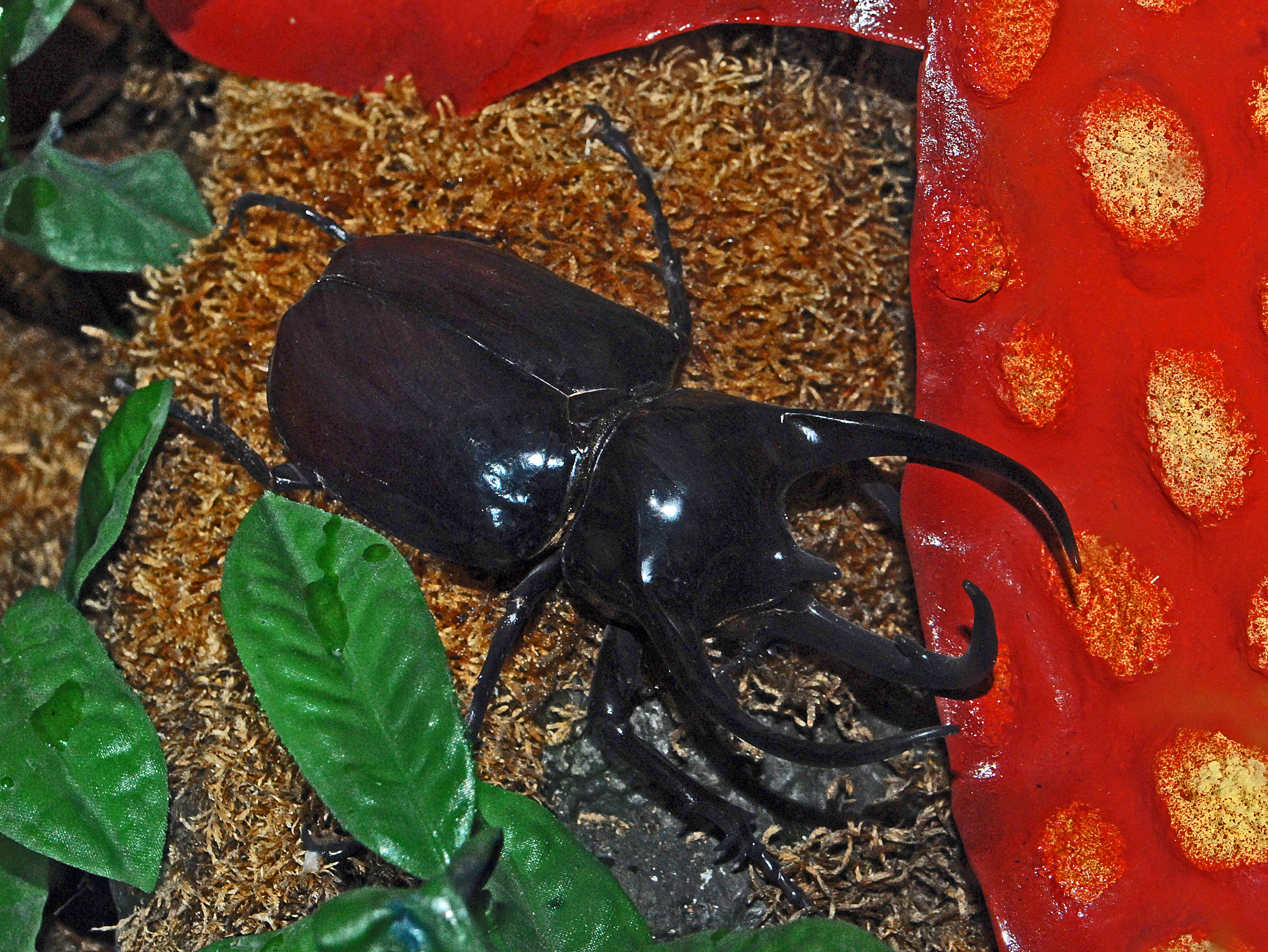
- Male

Scientific classification
- Kingdom: Animalia
- Phylum: Arthropoda
- Clade: Pancrustacea
- Class: Insecta
- Order: Coleoptera
- Suborder: Polyphaga
- Infraorder: Scarabaeiformia
- Family: Scarabaeidae
- Genus: Chalcosoma
- Species: C. chiron

Binomial name
- Chalcosoma chiron (Olivier, 1789)

Synonyms
- Chalcosoma caucasus (Fabricius, 1801)

= Chalcosoma chiron =

Caucasus beetle

Species of beetle

Chalcosoma chiron (often called the Caucasus beetle) is a species of beetle in the family Scarabaeidae. This species can be found from Malaysia south into Indonesia (Sumatra, Java, Malay Peninsula, Indochina) and Thailand in East region (Chanthaburi province, Sa Kaeo province). It was formerly known as Chalcosoma caucasus, a name which is a junior synonym and not valid.

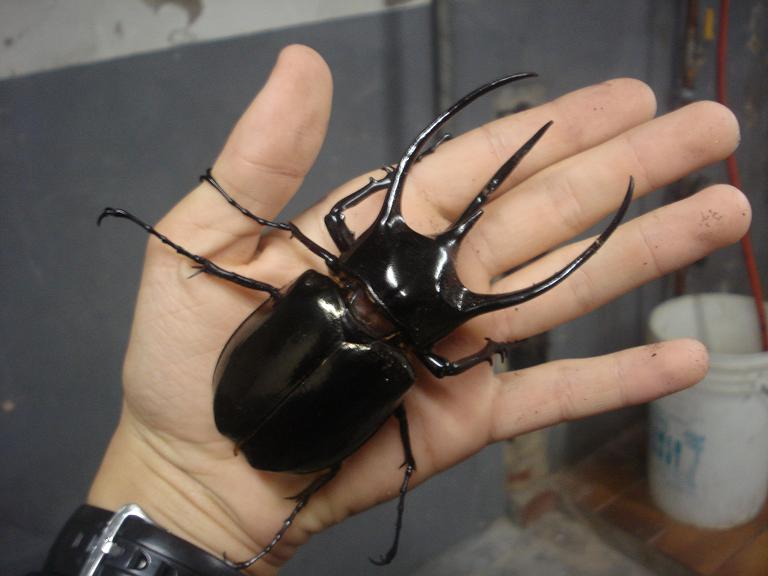
Male

== Description ==
Chalcosoma chiron males can reach a length of 90–130 mm (3.5–5.1 in), while females grow to 50–60 mm (2.0–2.4 in). Caucasus beetles are the largest of the genus Chalcosoma and one of Asia's largest beetles. They have a striking sexual dimorphism. The male has specialised enormous, curved horns on its head and thorax that it can use to fight with other males to gain mating rights with females. A female is significantly smaller. The elytra of the females have a velvety texture, as they are covered by tiny hairs. Caucasus beetles differ from Atlas beetles (for which they are often mistaken) in that they have a small tooth on their lower horns.

Their grubs go through three molts, and generally live underground for 12–15 months; the larger males remain grubs longer than females. Their pupae live 1–2 months, while the adults live for 3–5 months. Females live longer than males.

== Subspecies ==
- C. c. belangeri - Thailand, Langkawi, Vietnam
- C. c. chiron - Java
- C. c. kirbyi - West Malaysia
- C. c. janssensi - Sumatra
