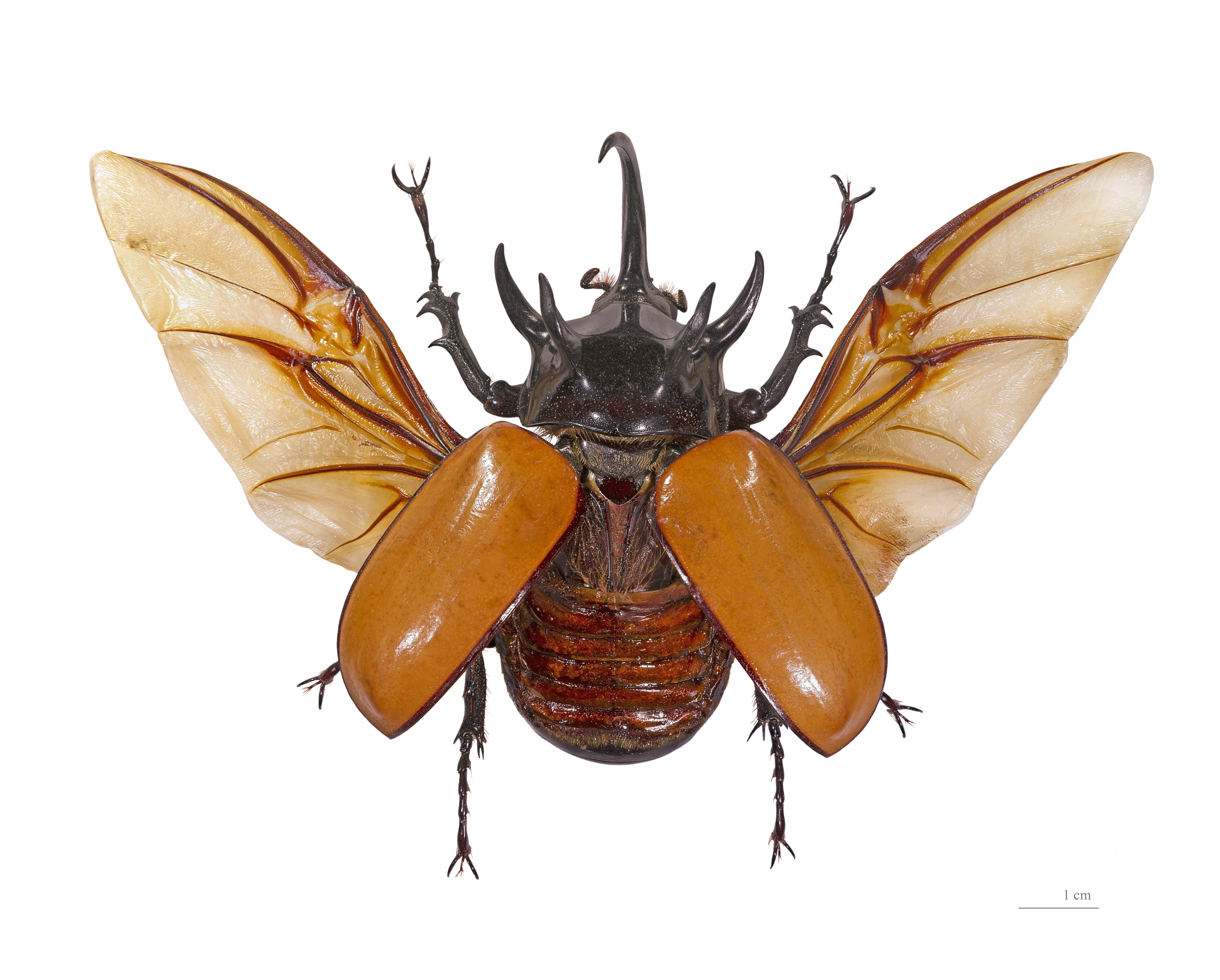

Scientific classification
- Kingdom: Animalia
- Phylum: Arthropoda
- Clade: Pancrustacea
- Class: Insecta
- Order: Coleoptera
- Suborder: Polyphaga
- Infraorder: Scarabaeiformia
- Family: Scarabaeidae
- Genus: Eupatorus
- Species: E. gracilicornis

Binomial name
- Eupatorus gracilicornis Arrow, 1908

= Eupatorus gracilicornis =

Species of beetle

Eupatorus gracilicornis, the five-horned rhinoceros beetle (Thai: ด้วงกว่างซางเหนือ (DâwŋGwā̀ŋŞāŋĦeNǖx)) is a beetle that has four large horns on the prothorax and one extra-long cephalic horn. Rhinoceros beetles, the Dynastinae, are a subfamily of the scarab beetle family (Scarabaeidae).

The five-horned rhinoceros beetle has been found in China, India, Myanmar, Thailand, Cambodia, Malaysia, Laos and Vietnam. Its coloring is shiny jet-black, while the elytra or fore wings are colored yellow or gold. The body is covered by a thick exoskeleton and a pair of thick wing covers lay atop another set of membranous wings underneath, allowing the beetle to fly, although not very efficiently, owing to its large size.

The flying season is usually in September, when most of the males usually appear to wait for copulation. Its length is 50–95 mm. As a larva, its diet is rotten wood. Its adult diet consists of nectar, plant sap and fruit. It was first described by the British entomologist Gilbert John Arrow in 1908.

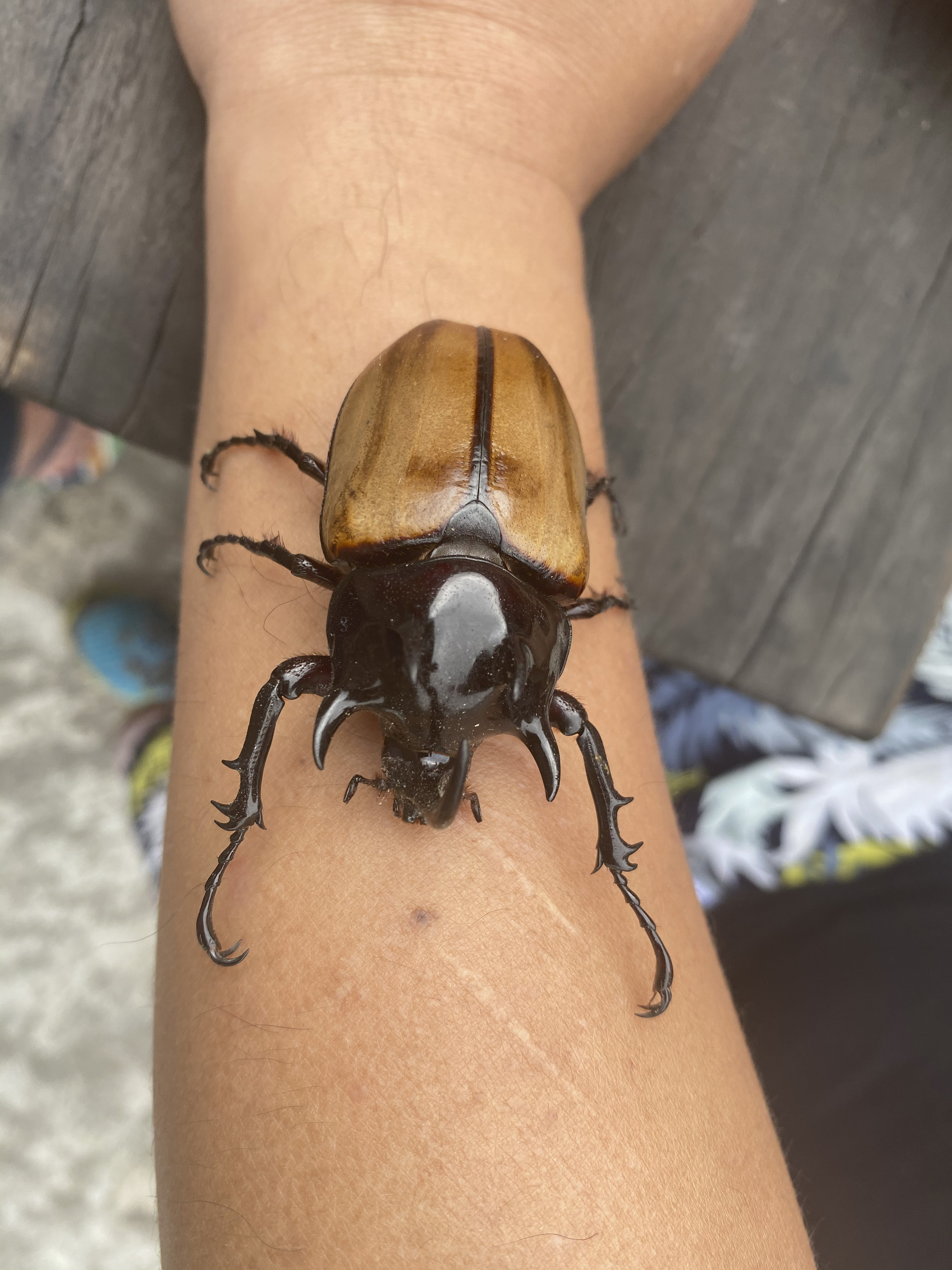
Five horned rhino beetle was found in the wilderness north of Liuzhou, Guangxi, China

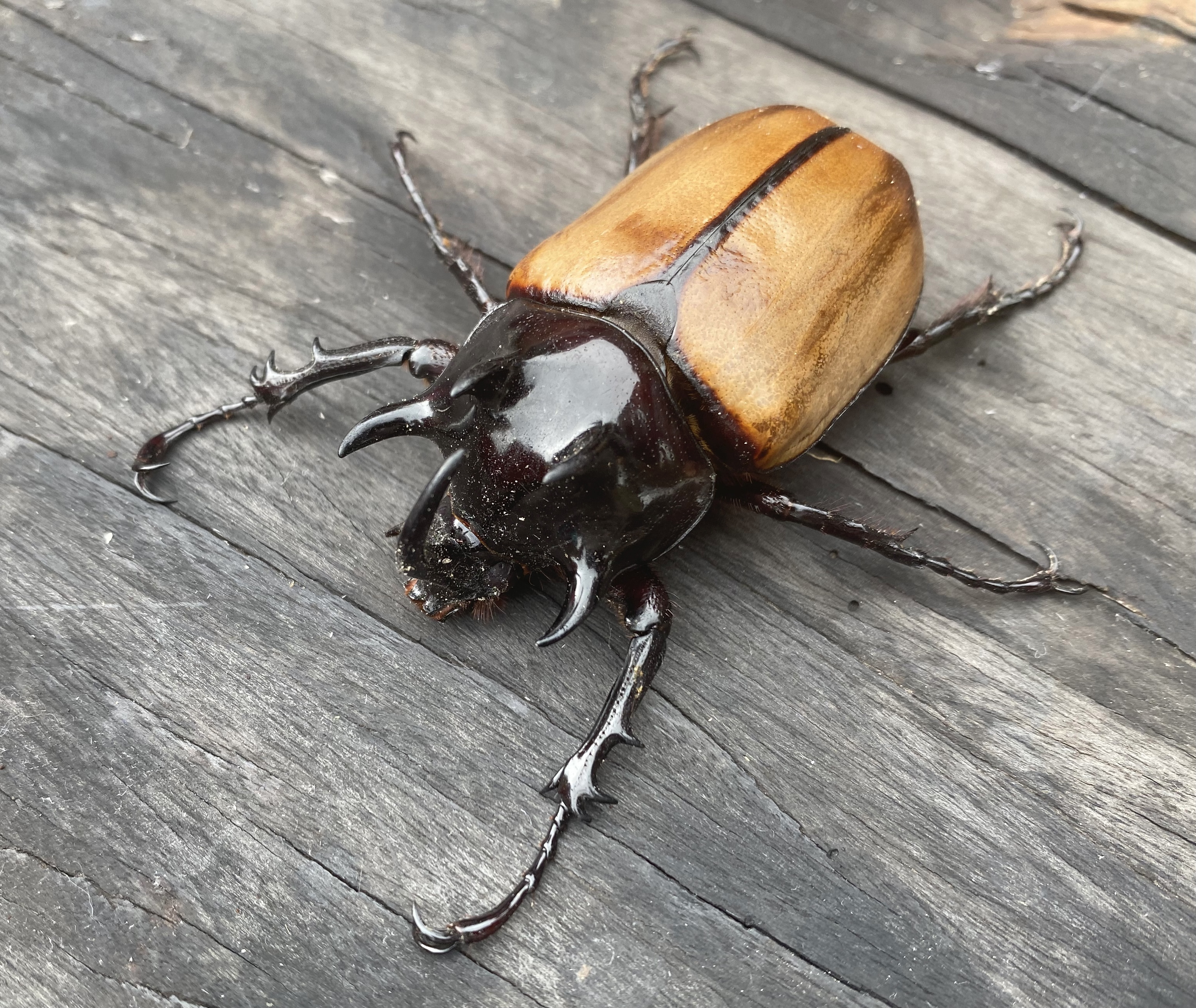
This was found in the wilderness north of Liuzhou, Guangxi, China
