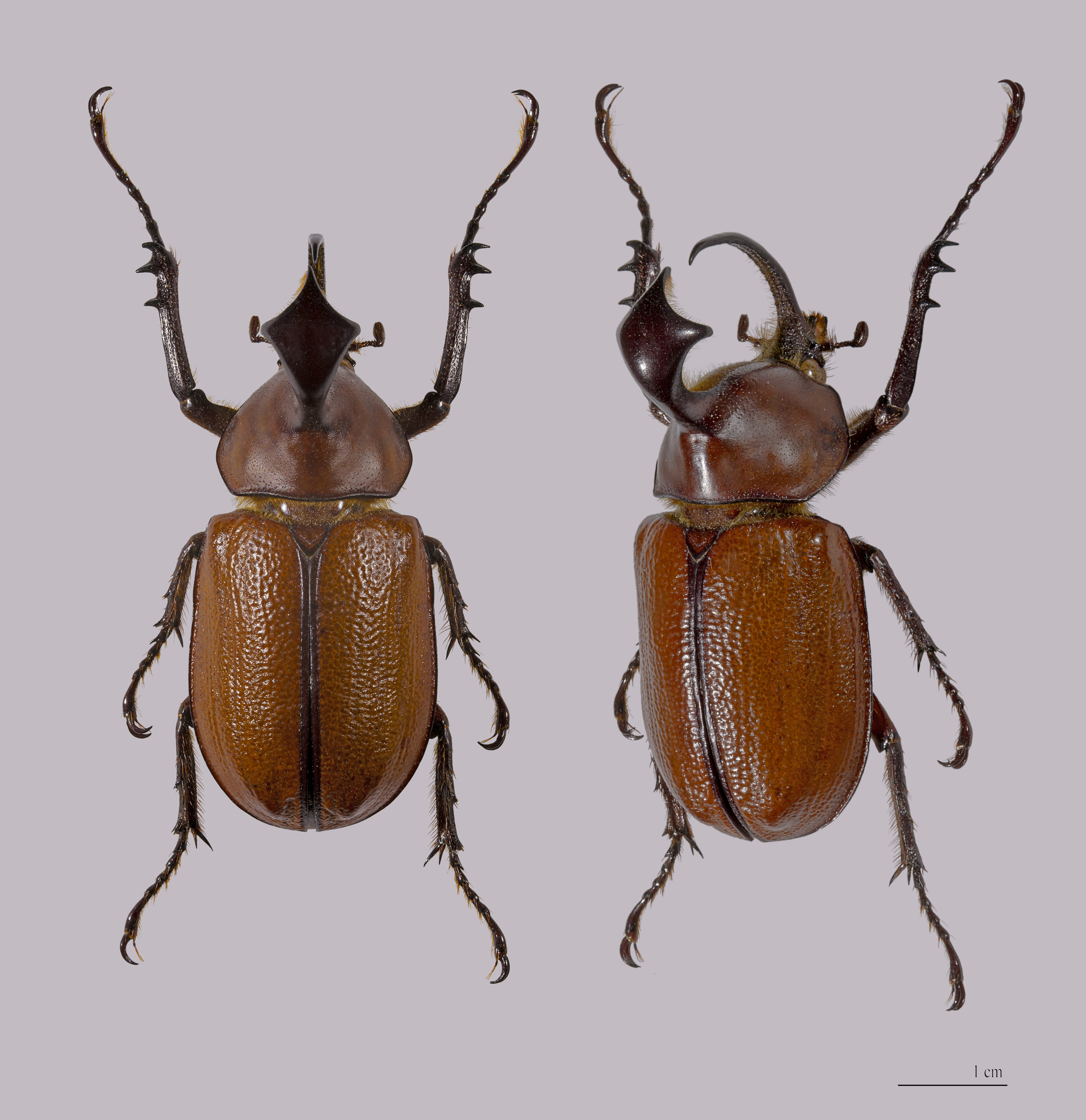

Scientific classification
- Kingdom: Animalia
- Phylum: Arthropoda
- Class: Insecta
- Order: Coleoptera
- Suborder: Polyphaga
- Infraorder: Scarabaeiformia
- Family: Scarabaeidae
- Genus: Golofa
- Species: G. claviger

Binomial name
- Golofa claviger (Linnaeus, 1771)

Synonyms
- Scarabaeus claviger Linnaeus, 1771; Scarabaeus hastatus Fabricius, 1781; Scarabaeus subgrundator Voet, 1806; Golofa guildinii Hope, 1837; Golofa puncticollis Thomson, 1860; Golofa guildingi; Golofa hastatus; Golofa sagittaria; Golofa subgrundator

= Golofa claviger =

Species of beetle

Golofa claviger is a beetle species of the genus Golofa. It lives in Peru and Ecuador. It reaches about 40 to 65 mm for males, and 35 to 55 mm for females. This species is considered a pest of oil palms found in Brazil. The beetle's feeding behavior damages the palm's tissues and limits its photosynthetic capacity.
