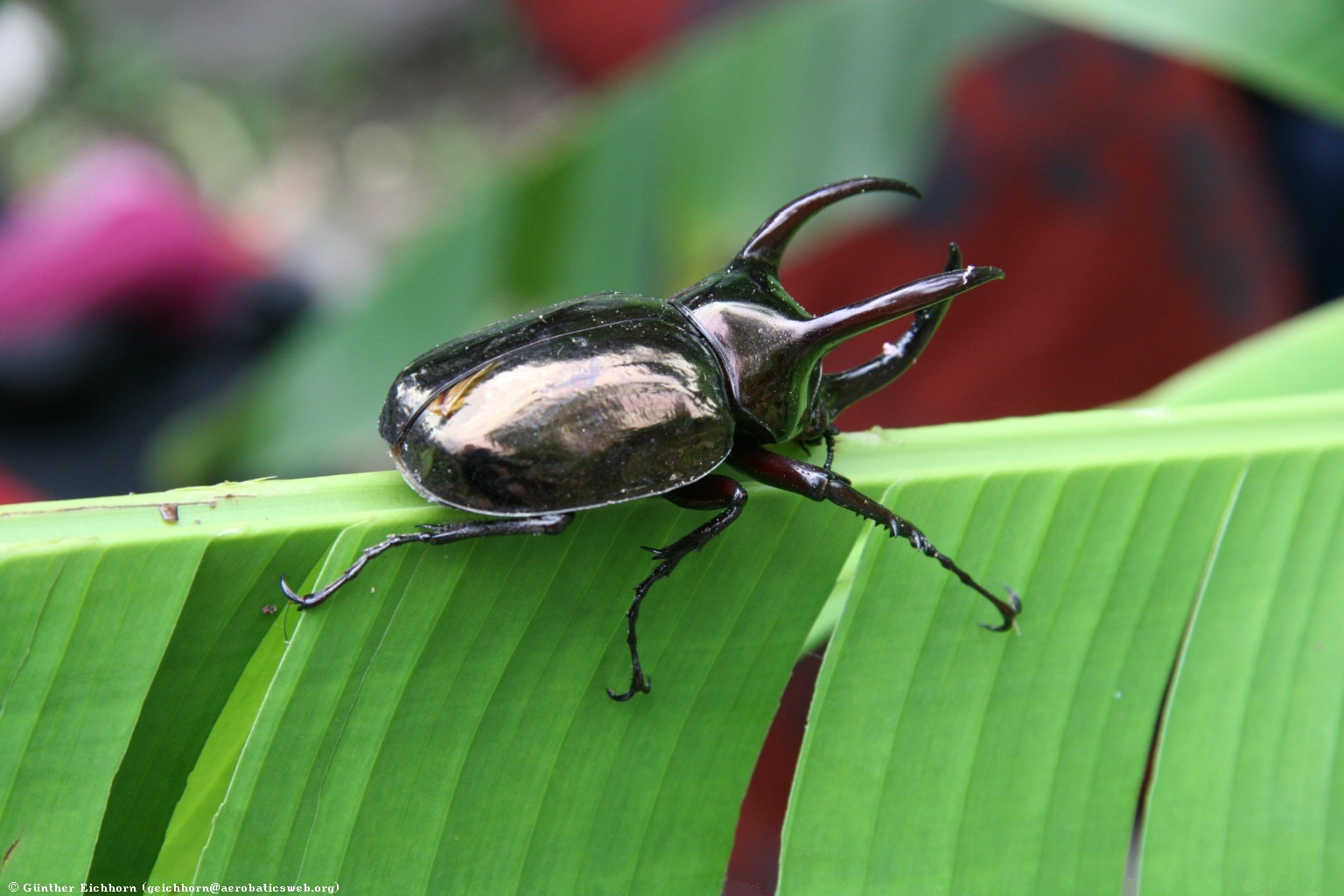
- Chalcosoma atlas

Scientific classification
- Kingdom: Animalia
- Phylum: Arthropoda
- Clade: Pancrustacea
- Class: Insecta
- Order: Coleoptera
- Suborder: Polyphaga
- Infraorder: Scarabaeiformia
- Family: Scarabaeidae
- Subfamily: Dynastinae
- Tribe: Dynastini
- Genus: Chalcosoma; Hope, 1837

= Chalcosoma =

Genus of beetles

Chalcosoma is a genus of Southeast Asian rhinoceros beetles. They are known as three horned rhinoceros beetles for their trident like horn. They are endemic to Southeast Asia.

== Etymology ==
The name Chalcosoma can be translated as being formed from the Ancient Greek χαλκός (khalkós), meaning "copper", and σῶμα (sôma), meaning "body".

== Species ==
- Chalcosoma argregs Takeuchi, 2014
- Chalcosoma atlas (Linnaeus, 1758)
- Chalcosoma chiron ((Olivier, 1789) (incl. synonyms Chalcosoma caucasus and Chalcosoma janssensi)
- Chalcosoma engganense Nagai, 2004
- Chalcosoma moellenkampi Kolbe, 1900

== See also ==
- List of largest insects
