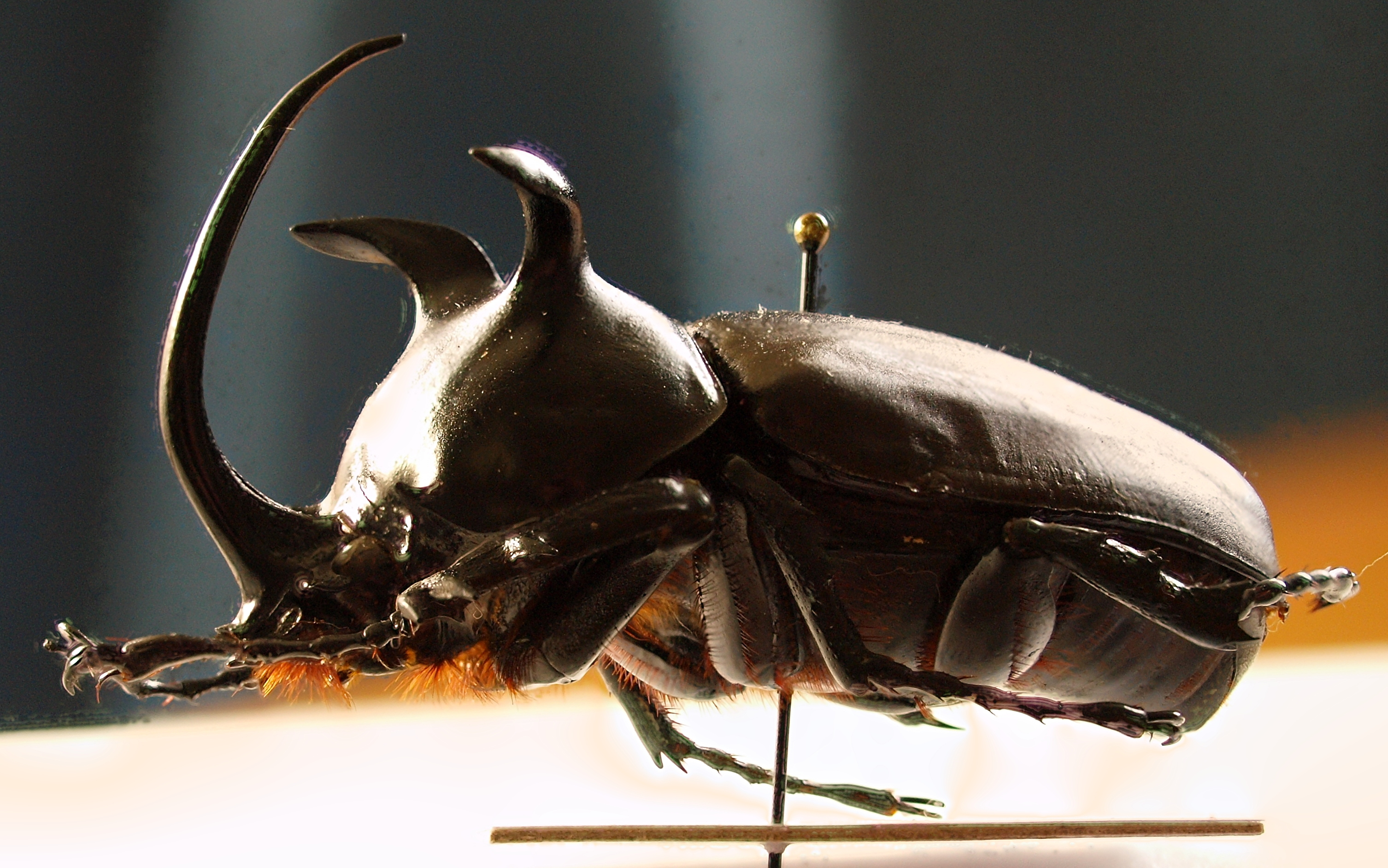

Scientific classification
- Domain: Eukaryota
- Kingdom: Animalia
- Phylum: Arthropoda
- Class: Insecta
- Order: Coleoptera
- Suborder: Polyphaga
- Infraorder: Scarabaeiformia
- Family: Scarabaeidae
- Genus: Eupatorus
- Species: E. siamensis

Binomial name
- Eupatorus siamensis Castelnau, 1867

= Eupatorus siamensis =

Species of beetle

Eupatorus siamensis (Thai: ด้วงกว่างซางสยาม) is a species of rhinoceros beetle in Isan, Thailand and Cambodia.
