= Xylotrupes taprobanus =

Scientific classification
- Kingdom: Animalia
- Phylum: Arthropoda
- Class: Insecta
- Order: Coleoptera
- Suborder: Polyphaga
- Infraorder: Scarabaeiformia
- Family: Scarabaeidae
- Genus: Xylotrupes
- Species: X. taprobanus

Binomial name
- Xylotrupes taprobanus Prell, 1914

Synonyms
- Xylotrupes meridionalis taprobanes Prell, 1914

Species of beetle

Xylotrupes taprobanus, is a species of rhinoceros beetle found in India and Sri Lanka.

== Description ==
The subspecies X. t. ganesha is described as follows:

== Subspecies ==
Two subspecies are recognized.

- Xylotrupes taprobanus ganesha Silvestre, 2003
- Xylotrupes taprobanus taprobanus Prell, 1914
