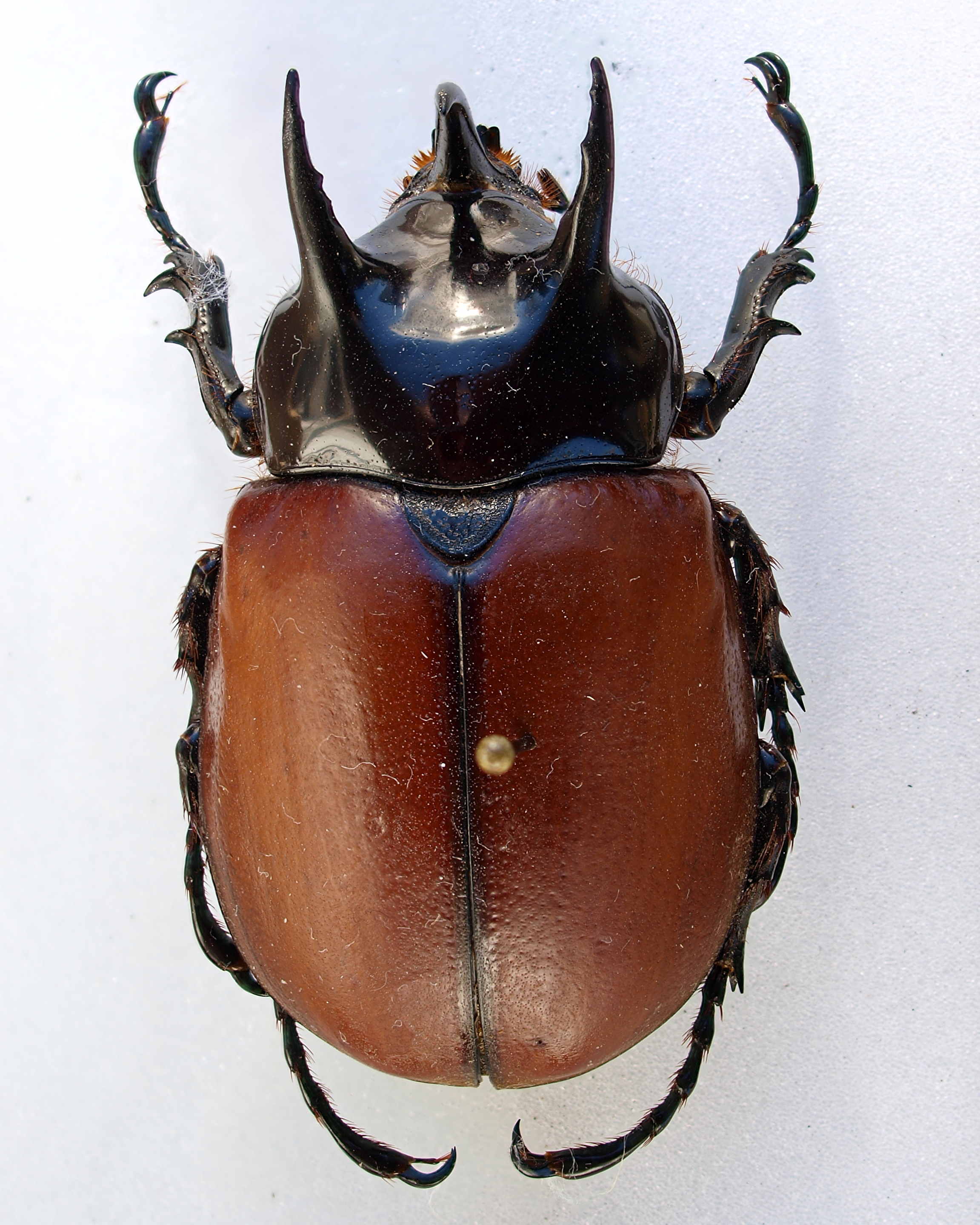

Scientific classification
- Domain: Eukaryota
- Kingdom: Animalia
- Phylum: Arthropoda
- Class: Insecta
- Order: Coleoptera
- Suborder: Polyphaga
- Infraorder: Scarabaeiformia
- Family: Scarabaeidae
- Subfamily: Dynastinae
- Tribe: Dynastini
- Genus: Debeckius; Allsopp, 2022
- Species: D. beccarii

Binomial name
- Debeckius beccarii (Gestro, 1876)

Synonyms
- List (Genus): Odontocera Beck, 1937 (Preocc.); Beckius Dechambre, 1992 (Preocc.); (Species): Chalcosoma beccarii Gestro, 1876; Beckius beccarii (Gestro, 1876); Beckius beccari (Gestro, 1876) [lapsus]; Eupatorus beccarii (Gestro, 1876); Odontocera beccarii (Gestro, 1876)

= Debeckius =

Debeckius beccarii

Genus of beetles

Debeckius is a genus of scarab beetles. It is monotypic, being represented by the single species, Debeckius beccarii. It is native to New Guinea. It was previously assigned to the genus Beckius, but that name was preoccupied by a fossil whitefish.

== Taxonomy ==
The genus Debeckius is classified within the tribe Dynastini, known as true rhinoceros beetles. The following subspecies are recognised:

- Debeckius beccarii beccarii (Gestro, 1876)
- Debeckius beccarii koletta (Voirin, 1978)
- Debeckius beccarii ryusuii (Nagai, 2006)
