= Xylotrupes siamensis =

Scientific classification
- Domain: Eukaryota
- Kingdom: Animalia
- Phylum: Arthropoda
- Class: Insecta
- Order: Coleoptera
- Suborder: Polyphaga
- Infraorder: Scarabaeiformia
- Family: Scarabaeidae
- Genus: Xylotrupes
- Species: X. siamensis

Binomial name
- Xylotrupes siamensis Minck, 1920

Species of beetle

Xylotrupes siamensis is a species of rhinoceros beetle found across Asia.

== Description ==
Adult males from different geographical origins have been shown to exhibit different horn phenotypes, pronotum and elytra texture and body coloration but display the same genital structure.

== Taxonomy ==
There has been disagreement in the taxonomy of X. siamensis due to its phenotypic variation, but a 2021 study used molecular analyses to investigate the genetic divergence between populations displaying different male horn phenotypes. It was concluded that the observed divergence within X. siamensis is the result of the first phase of allopatric speciation, where geographical isolation can result in the generation of distinct taxa, but the process of speciation did not complete because the second phase of allopatric speciation (reproductive isolation) had not evolved by the time the geographically separated populations re-established contact.

== Distribution ==
Xylotrupes siamensis has been found in Thailand, Laos, China, and Vietnam.
