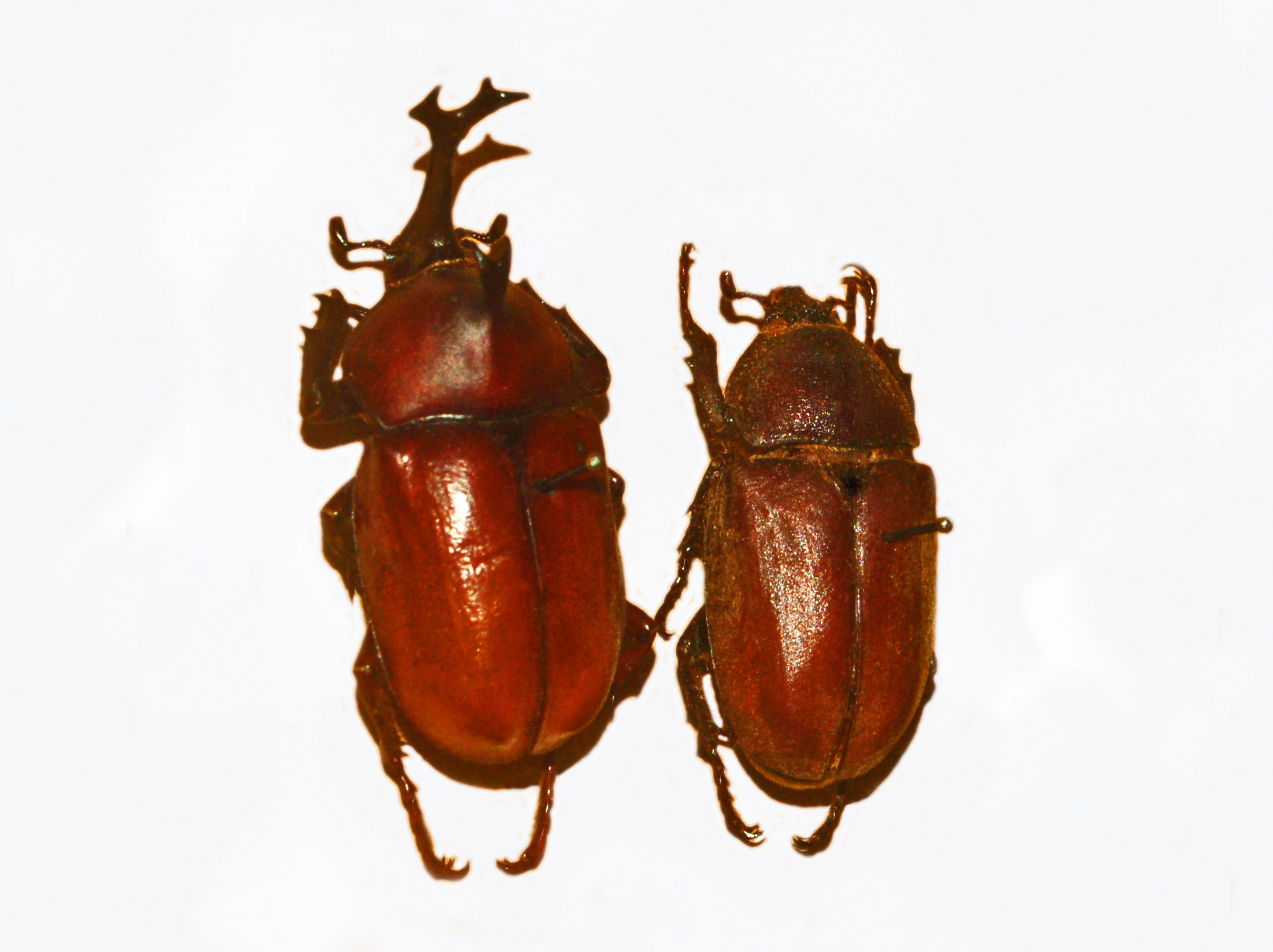
- Trypoxylus dichotomus

Scientific classification
- Kingdom: Animalia
- Phylum: Arthropoda
- Clade: Pancrustacea
- Class: Insecta
- Order: Coleoptera
- Suborder: Polyphaga
- Infraorder: Scarabaeiformia
- Family: Scarabaeidae
- Subfamily: Dynastinae
- Tribe: Dynastini
- Genus: Trypoxylus; Minck, 1920

= Trypoxylus =

Genus of beetles

Trypoxylus is a genus of rhinoceros beetle.

== Species ==
according to CoL:

- Trypoxylus dichotomus Japanese rhinoceros beetle
- Trypoxylus kanamorii
