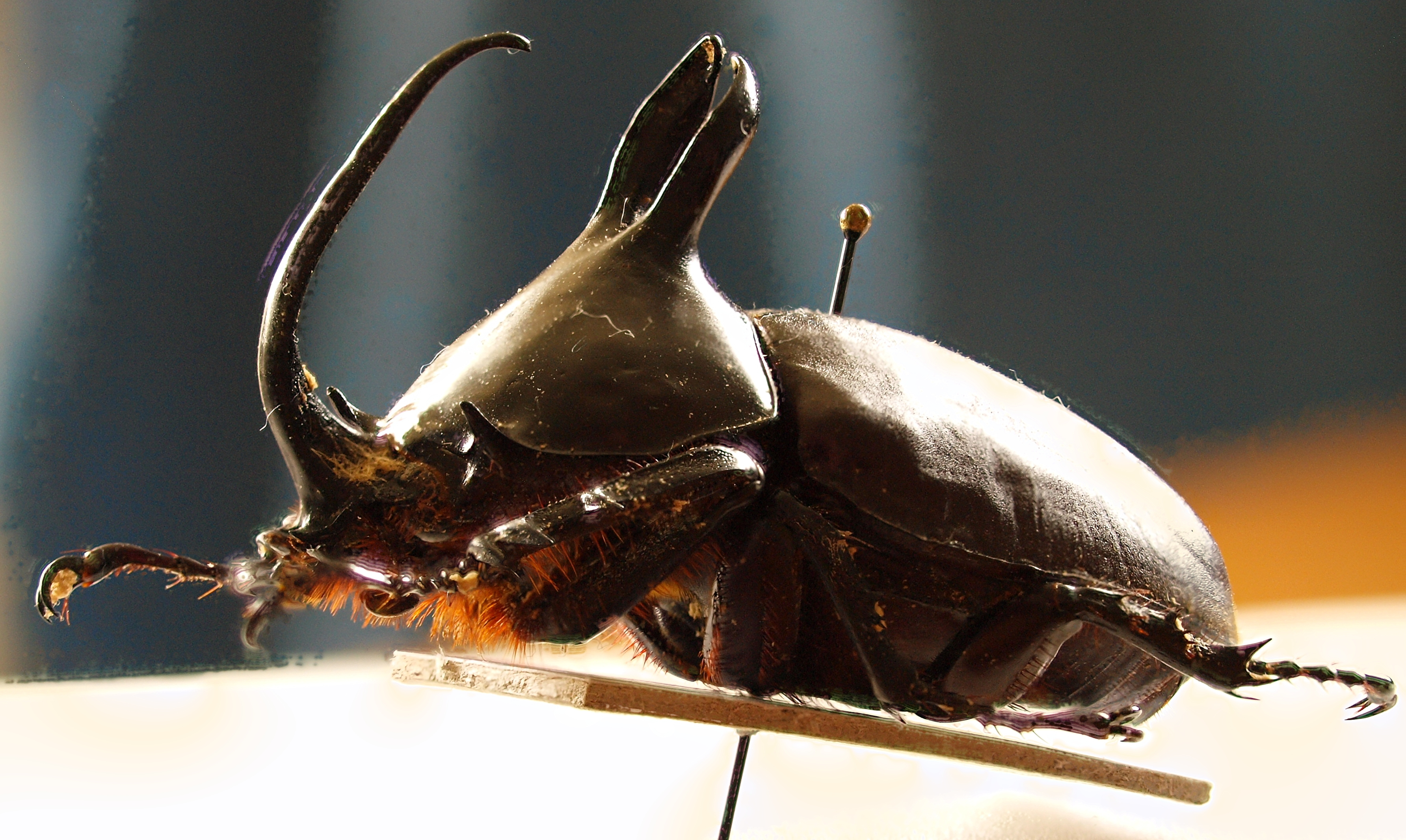

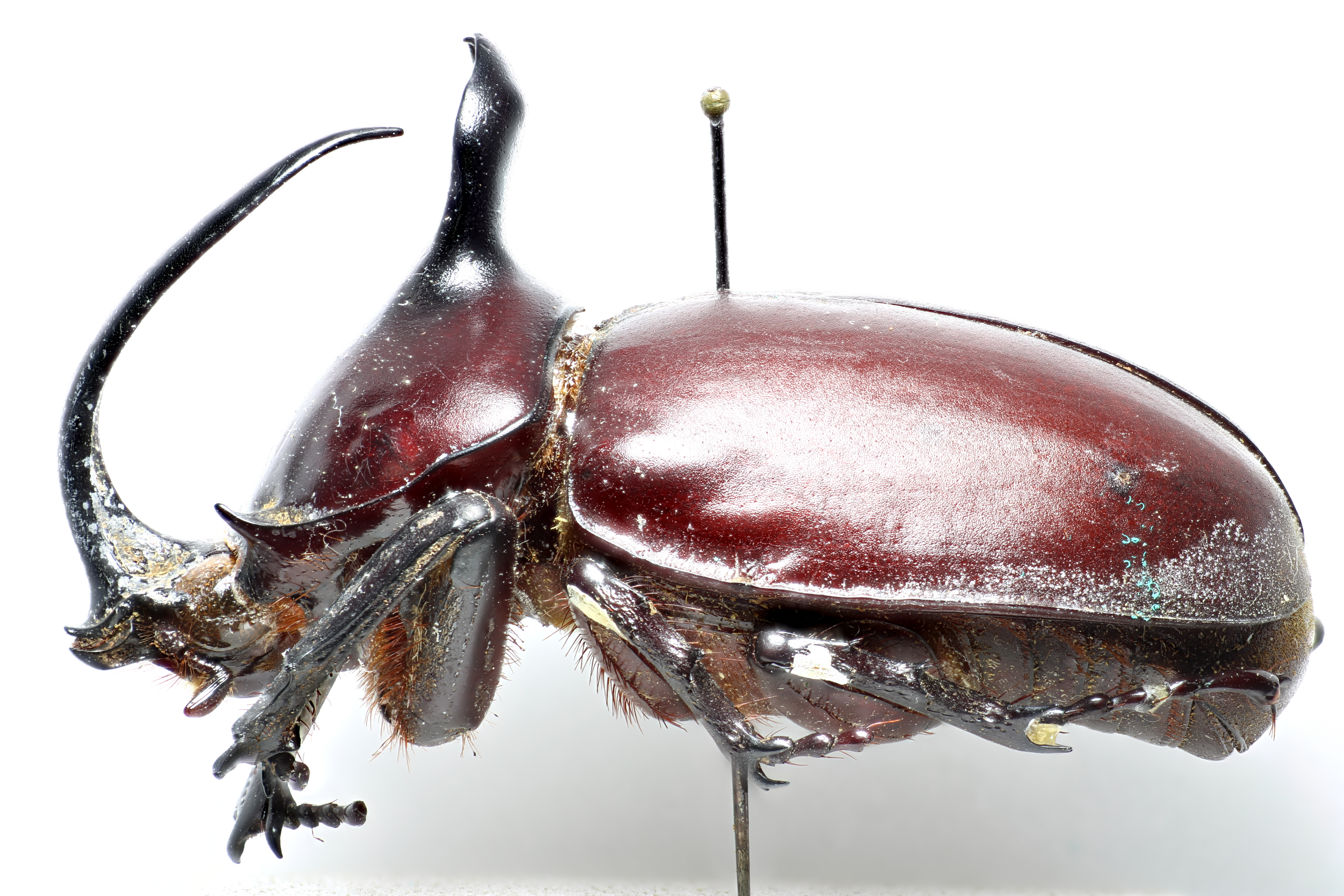
- Side view

Scientific classification
- Kingdom: Animalia
- Phylum: Arthropoda
- Clade: Pancrustacea
- Class: Insecta
- Order: Coleoptera
- Suborder: Polyphaga
- Infraorder: Scarabaeiformia
- Family: Scarabaeidae
- Genus: Eupatorus
- Species: E. birmanicus

Binomial name
- Eupatorus birmanicus Arrow, 1908

= Eupatorus birmanicus =

Species of beetle

Eupatorus birmanicus is a species of beetle belonging to the subfamily Dynastinae. It is commonly known as the rabbit ears beetle due to its two rear horns having a resemblance to rabbit ears. The species can be found in Thailand and Malaysia.

== Appearance ==
Eupatorus Birmanicus is reddish brown in color. Males are characterized by two long pronotal horns and a long, curved cephalic (head) horn. Adult range from 30–60 mm in length. The pronotum is narrow and tall, sloping steeply toward the head.

== Habitat ==
The species inhabitants mountainous forests along the Tenasserim Range in western Thailand and Myanmar.
