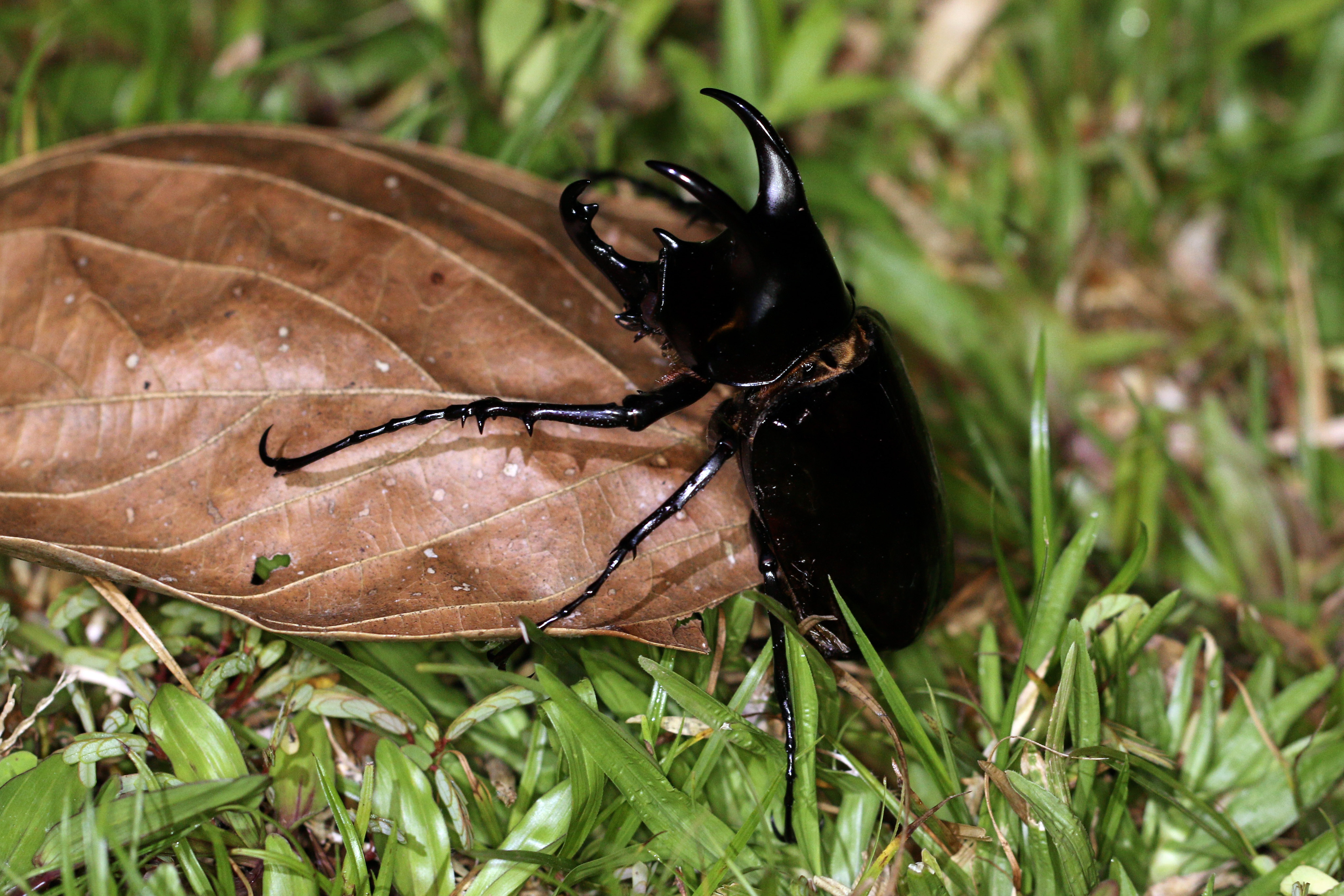
- Male
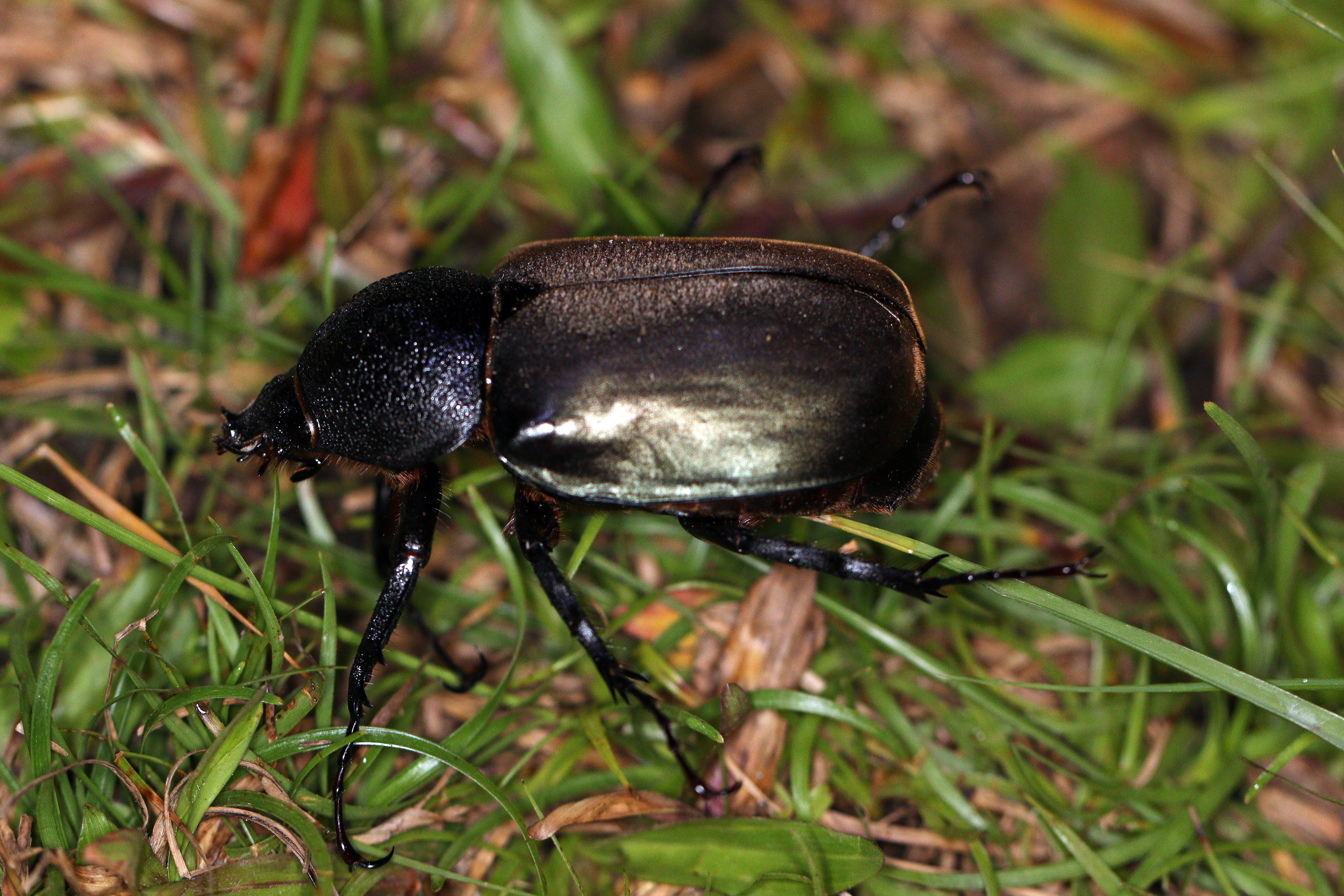
- Female both Sabah, Borneo

Scientific classification
- Kingdom: Animalia
- Phylum: Arthropoda
- Clade: Pancrustacea
- Class: Insecta
- Order: Coleoptera
- Suborder: Polyphaga
- Infraorder: Scarabaeiformia
- Family: Scarabaeidae
- Genus: Chalcosoma
- Species: C. moellenkampi

Binomial name
- Chalcosoma moellenkampi Kolbe, 1900

= Moellenkampi beetle =

Species of beetle

The Moellenkampi beetle (Chalcosoma moellenkampi), is one of four large species of rhinoceros beetles from Southeast Asia belonging to the genus Chalcosoma. The Moellenkampi beetles belong to the beetle family Scarabaeidae along with other rhinoceros beetles. They are characterized by having two large, forward-projecting horns on the pronotum or thorax, and another large, forward and upward-projecting horn on the head. They also have a distinct metallic lustre, which is the reason behind their genus name, which derives from Greek, chalko-, and is the combining form of chalkós, meaning copper.

== Distribution ==
Unlike its close relatives, C. atlas and C. chiron, C. moellenkampi has a rather restricted geographic distribution and appears to occur only on Borneo.

== Description ==
Chalcosoma moellenkampi can reach about the same size as C. atlas, and males may measure up to 110 mm (4.3 in) from the tip of the head horn to the end of the elytra (wingcases). The largest species in the genus is Chalcosoma chiron, where males may occasionally reach 130 mm (5.1 in). Females are much smaller than males, usually only 45–60 mm (1.8–2.4 in), and lack horns. Unlike the males, which in Chalcosoma can be distinguished from each other using the characteristics listed below, females are very similar in the three Chalcosoma species, and can usually only be distinguished from each other by specialists.

Atlas beetle males are renowned for their three horns, two on the pronotum and one on the head. Owing to environmental conditions, not all larvae grow to similar sizes, and those that live in harsher conditions, adult beetles become small. In small males, the horns are very short and the head horn extends almost vertically upwards and usually has three small prongs, but in large males, the horns are enormous, and the head horn projects mainly anteriorly with an upwards curvature. The size of the horns relative to the size of the beetle is thus positively allometric, meaning the horns are much larger relative to the body size of the beetle in large males compared to small males, which have very short horns. In contrast, females do not show such dramatic differences in body proportions, and large females are simply larger versions of small females.

== Behavior ==
As the other species of Atlas beetles, large males in C. moellenkampi are very aggressive towards other males, but small males are more peaceful, lacking the body size and large horns to fight. Unlike the great differences in horn size at different body sizes, the size of the male genitalia, known as parameres, do not vary nearly as much in large and small males, implying males of all sizes can still mate with females. In the wild, the Chalcosoma species live in rainforests and palm plantations, and males and females typically meet at feeding sites, for instance wounded trees, where the beetles drink the sap. They reach new areas by flying around at night. At the feeding sites, large males attempt to dominate the site by sheer size, and chase smaller males away. The dominance ensures the big males' mating rights with any females that come to the site. However, if two equally large males meet, neither is usually prepared to back away and they fight each other using their large horns, while also trying to trip the opponent with their long front legs. A male tries to pin a rival between the head horn—which it can move upwards or downwards as it raises or lowers its head—and the two pronotum horns. The beetle then tries to throw its rival off the branch, or throw it on its back.

In other beetles where only large males have big horns and are aggressive, small males rely on stealth, avoiding physical confrontation with the large males, and instead try to mate with females while the large males are busy fighting each other. While such behavior has not been reported from the wild for C. moellenkampi, it is known for C. atlas and it is probably present in C. moellenkampi, as well, since the two species are closely related and very similar in other life history aspects.

This violent temper also means that in captivity, males cannot be in the same vivarium, as they engage in violent fights that could cause physical injury. The species is less common among beetle hobbyists than C. atlas, and the breeding ecology is therefore less well known in C. moellenkampi, but C. atlas larvae are unusual among rhinoceros beetles by being quite aggressive and willing to bite if touched, and larvae of C. moellenkampi may share this behavior. Females burrow into the soil or into old rotting hardwood logs to lay eggs. The larvae go through three stages of development, and may reach a massive weight of 100 g. At the end of larval stage 3, the larva creates a large, oval cocoon of decayed wood and earth, where it transforms into a pupa, which hatches out in another two months. The total generation span from egg to adult beetle may take 13–18 months.
