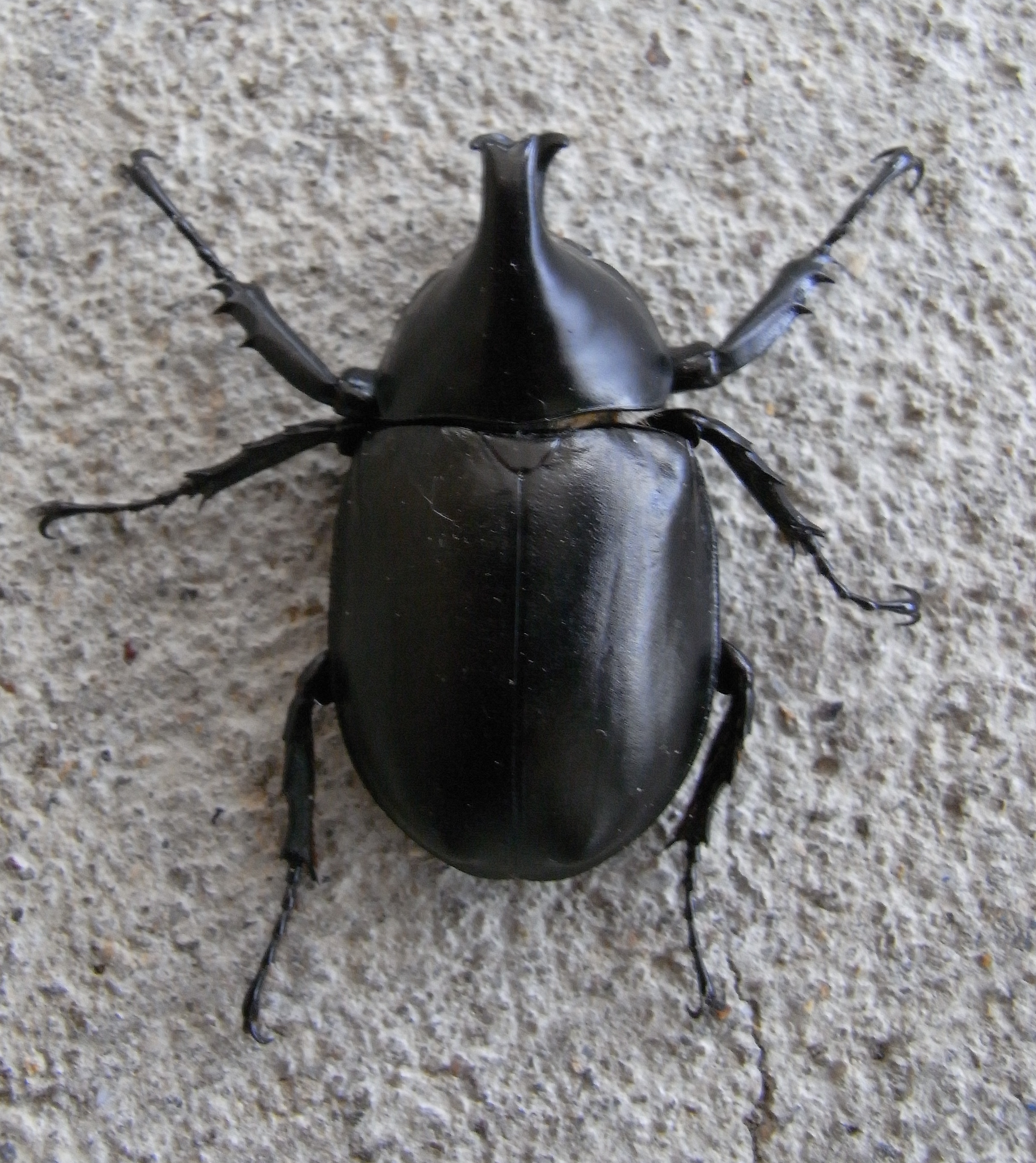

Scientific classification
- Kingdom: Animalia
- Phylum: Arthropoda
- Clade: Pancrustacea
- Class: Insecta
- Order: Coleoptera
- Suborder: Polyphaga
- Infraorder: Scarabaeiformia
- Family: Scarabaeidae
- Genus: Xylotrupes
- Species: X. ulysses

Binomial name
- Xylotrupes ulysses Guérin-Méneville, 1830

= Xylotrupes ulysses =

Species of beetle

Xylotrupes ulysses, common names "Elephant beetle", "Coconut palm beetle", "common rhinoceros beetle" or simply "rhinoceros beetle" is a species of rhinoceros beetle native to New Guinea. Male horns in several groups of this genus represent a special secondary sex characteristic. There is a bimodal horn-size distribution and there is a discrete male mating behavior correlated with each phenotype.

== Gallery ==
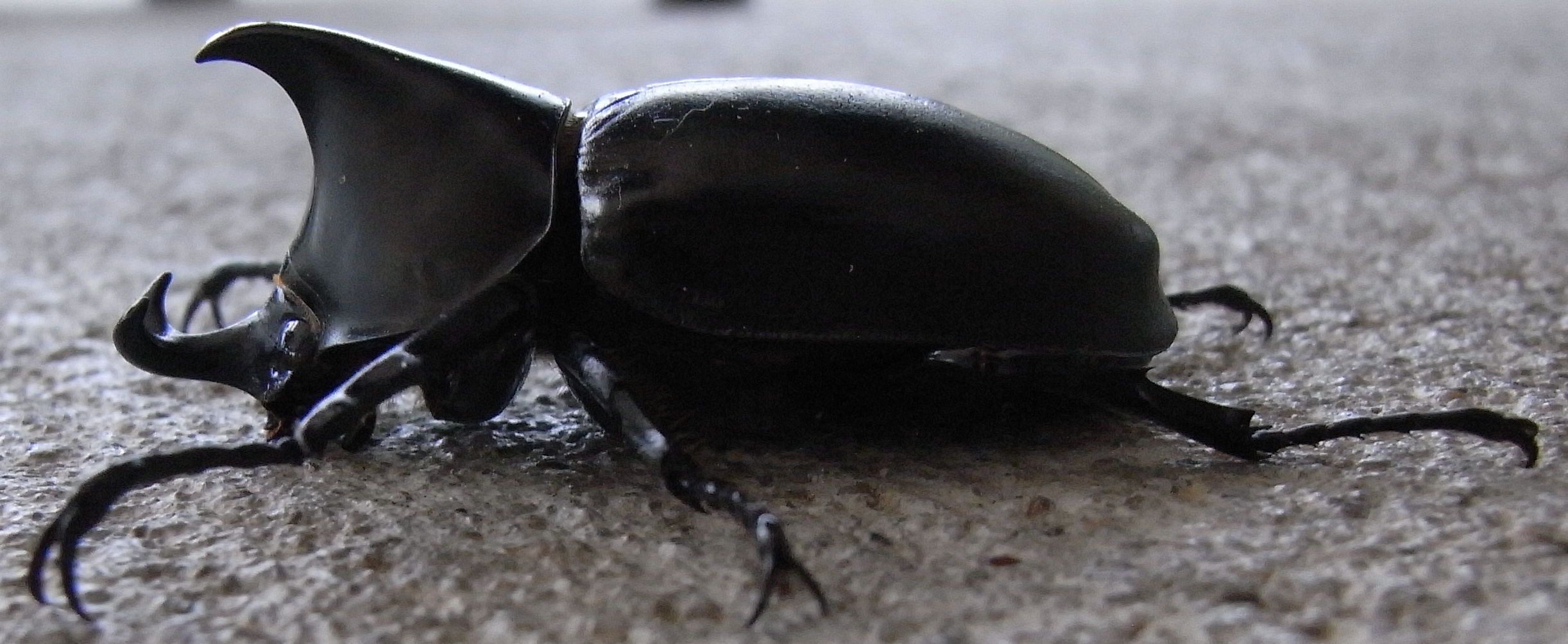
lateral view

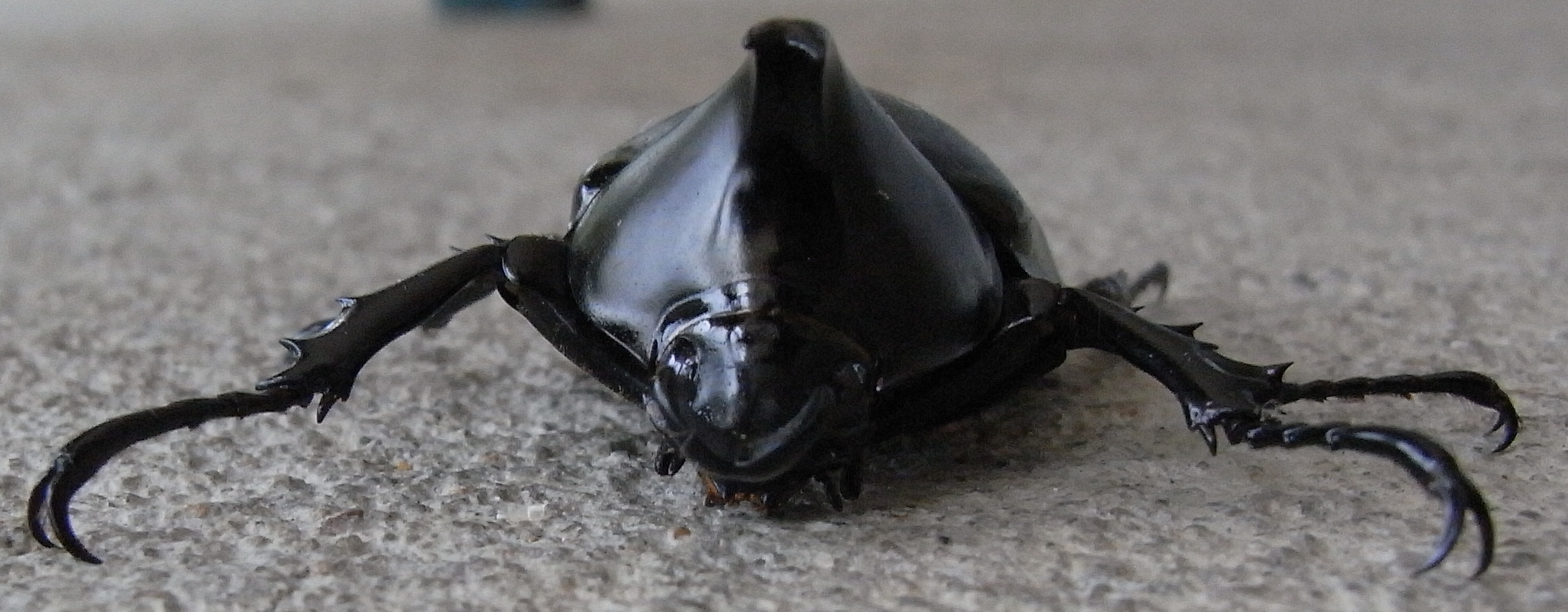
cranial view

== See also ==
- Xylotrupes gideon
- Elephant beetle
- Rhinoceros beetle
