= Allomyrina =

Scientific classification
- Kingdom: Animalia
- Phylum: Arthropoda
- Clade: Pancrustacea
- Class: Insecta
- Order: Coleoptera
- Suborder: Polyphaga
- Infraorder: Scarabaeiformia
- Family: Scarabaeidae
- Subfamily: Dynastinae
- Tribe: Dynastini
- Genus: Allomyrina; Arrow, 1911
- Species: A. pfeifferi

Binomial name
- Allomyrina pfeifferi (Redtenbacher, 1867)

Species of beetles

Allomyrina pfeifferi, commonly called fuzzy rhinoceros beetle, tempest rhinoceros beetle or rusty rhinoceros beetle, is a species of rhinoceros beetle. It is the only species in the genus Allomyrina.
