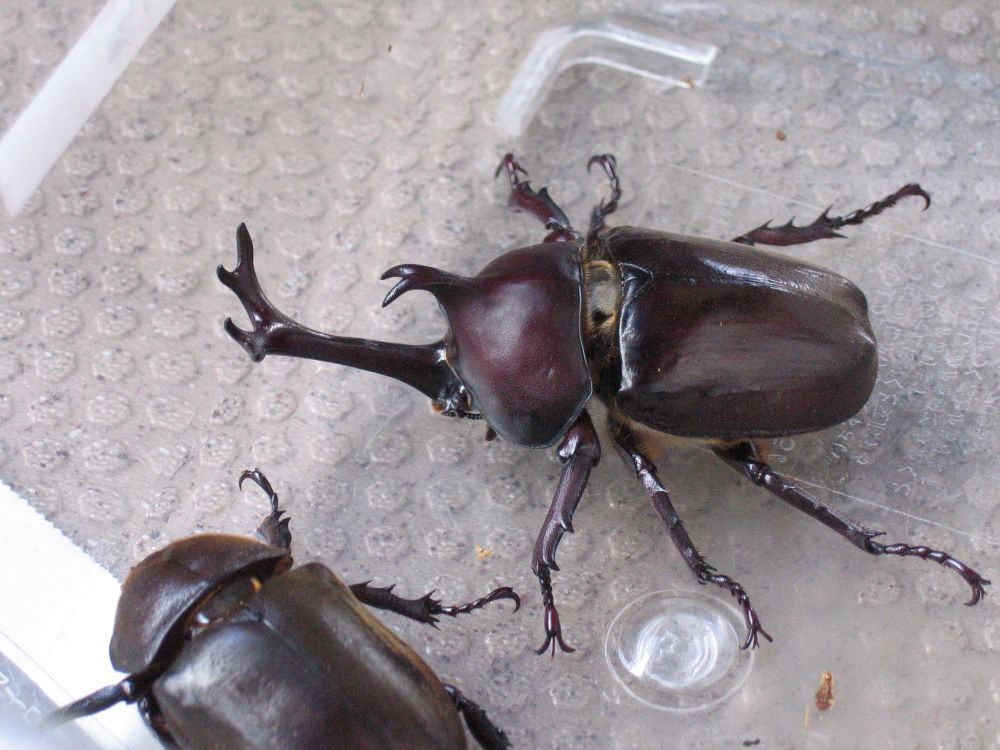

Scientific classification
- Kingdom: Animalia
- Phylum: Arthropoda
- Clade: Pancrustacea
- Class: Insecta
- Order: Coleoptera
- Suborder: Polyphaga
- Infraorder: Scarabaeiformia
- Family: Scarabaeidae
- Genus: Trypoxylus
- Species: T. dichotomus

Binomial name
- Trypoxylus dichotomus (Linnaeus, 1771)

Synonyms
- Scarabaeus dichotomus Linnaeus, 1771; Allomyrina dichotoma (Linnaeus, 1771)

= Japanese rhinoceros beetle =

Species of beetle

The Japanese rhinoceros beetle (Trypoxylus dichotomus), also known as the Japanese rhino beetle, the Japanese horned beetle, or by its Japanese name kabutomushi (兜虫, 甲虫 or カブトムシ), is a species of rhinoceros beetle. They are commonly found in continental Asia in countries such as China, the Korean peninsula, Japan, Vietnam, Burma, Thailand, and Taiwan. In these areas, this species of beetle is often found in broad-leaved forests with tropical or sub-tropical climates. This beetle is well known for the prominent cephalic horn found on males. Male Japanese rhinoceros beetles will use this horn to fight other males for territory and access to female mating partners. Upon contact, males will attempt to flip each other onto their backs or off of their feeding tree. In response to selective pressures, smaller male T. dichotomus have adapted a "sneak-like behavior". These smaller beetles will attempt to avoid physical confrontation with larger males and try to mate with females.

== List of subspecies ==
- Trypoxylus dichotomus corniculatus
- Trypoxylus dichotomus dichotomus: Mainland China, the Korean Peninsula
- Trypoxylus dichotomus septentrionalis: Honshu, Shikoku, Kyushu, Tsushima Island
- Trypoxylus dichotomus shennongji
- Trypoxylus dichotomus shizuae: Yakushima Island, Tanegashima Island
- Trypoxylus dichotomus takarai Okinawa
- Trypoxylus dichotomus tsuchiyai: Kuchinoerabu Island
- Trypoxylus dichotomus tsunobosonis: Taiwan
- Trypoxylus dichotomus xizangensis

== Description ==
These beetles have a dark brown and red appearance. However, their bodies can appear to be black without direct light. On average, males tend to measure between 40 and 80 mm, while females are typically smaller, growing between 35 and 60 mm long.

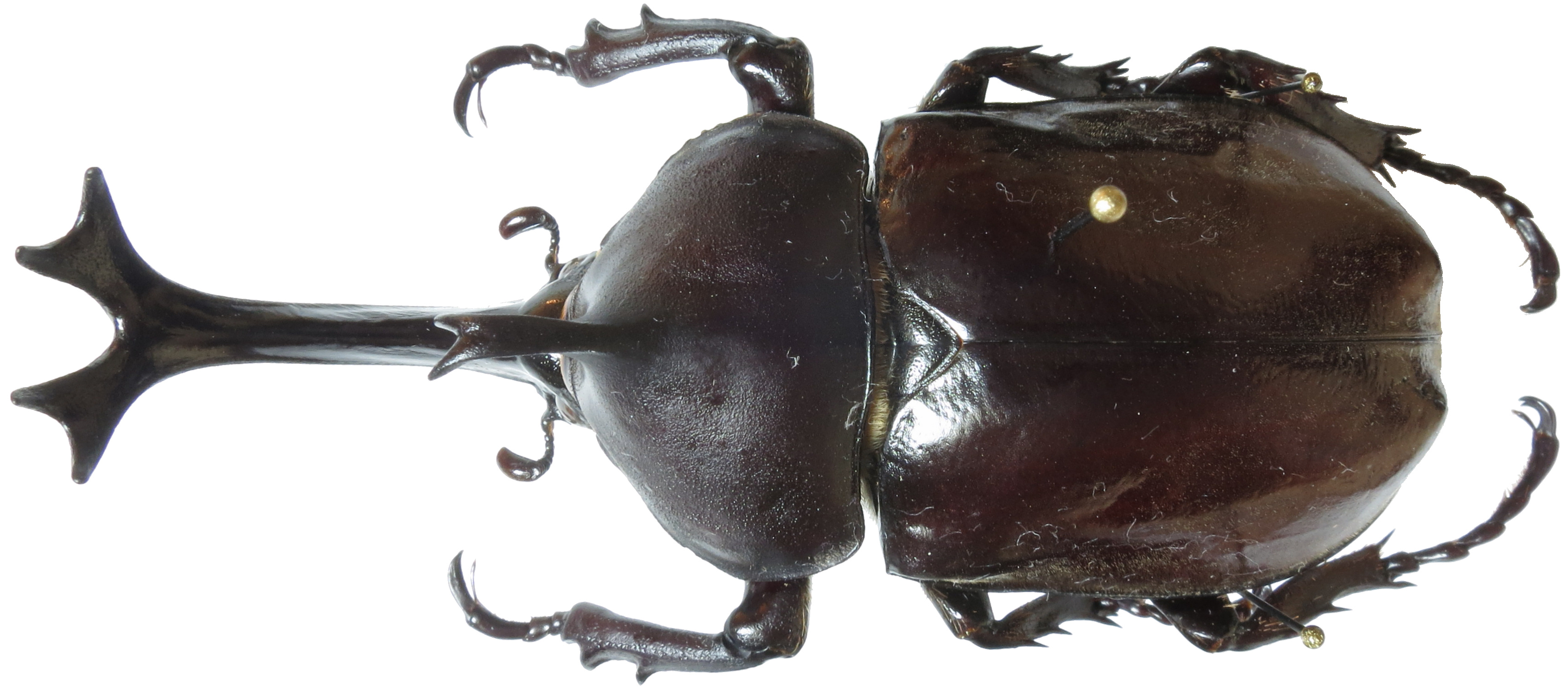
A. dichotoma male from Taiwan

Male A. dichotoma have a distinct sexually dimorphic horn protruding from the base of its head which can reach a length of up to one-third of its body length. The length of the male T. dichotomus elytra has been recorded to be between 19 and 33 mm and the male horn can range between 7 and 32 mm. As the horn is a sexually dimorphic trait, only male Japanese rhinoceros beetles will grow one. This cephalic horn is typically somewhat thin and "pitchfork shaped". This appendage acts as a lever arm and is commonly used as a tool to fight other males for access to territory and females. Despite the large size of the cephalic horn, male Japanese rhinoceros beetles are still capable of flight; male and females have been reported to fly at similar average speeds. Males with proportionally large horns compared to their body size possess larger wings to compensate.

== Geographic range ==
T. dichotomus can be found widely distributed throughout Asia, including China, Japan, Taiwan, Vietnam, Myanmar, Laos, India, Thailand, and the Korean Peninsula.

== Habitat ==
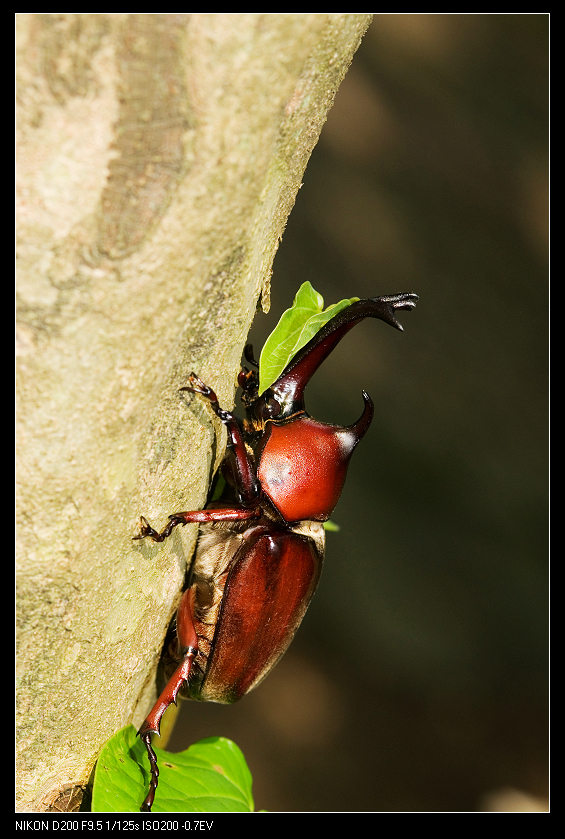
Japanese rhinoceros beetle climbing tree

This beetle species prefers to live in broad-leaved forests with tropical or sub-tropical climates. They can also be found often in mountainous environments. Across populations and regions, male beetles can vary greatly in size and horn performance, and it is suggested that differences are due to relative intensities of selection.

=== Bark-carving behavior ===
Adult Japanese rhinoceros beetles un-burrow from the earth during the summer months between June and August. They prefer to congregate on wounded tree trunks. Quercus acustissima, Quercus serrata, and Quercus mongolica grosseserrata are the most common trees they choose. A tree wound is caused by boring insects which break through the exterior of the tree and feed on the nutrient-rich sap on the interior. Adult T. dichotomus takes advantage of the easily accessible food and consume the exposed tree sap. A subspecies of T. dichotomus known as Trypoxylus dichotomus septentrionalis exhibits bark-carving behavior. This variety of Japanese rhinoceros beetle does not require other insects to breach the tough arboreal exterior to access sap. Notably, these beetles conduct this behavior on Fraxinus griffithii trees, which have a thinner bark than the aforementioned species; this thinner exterior is considerably easier to cut through. These beetles cut into the tree by using their clypeus as a chisel. They hold on tightly to the tree and move their head back and forth to cut into the bark. For a short time, sap flows out of the newly made wound, and the Japanese rhinoceros beetle can feed. After a few minutes, the sap stops flowing, so the beetle begins to carve again.

== Life cycle ==
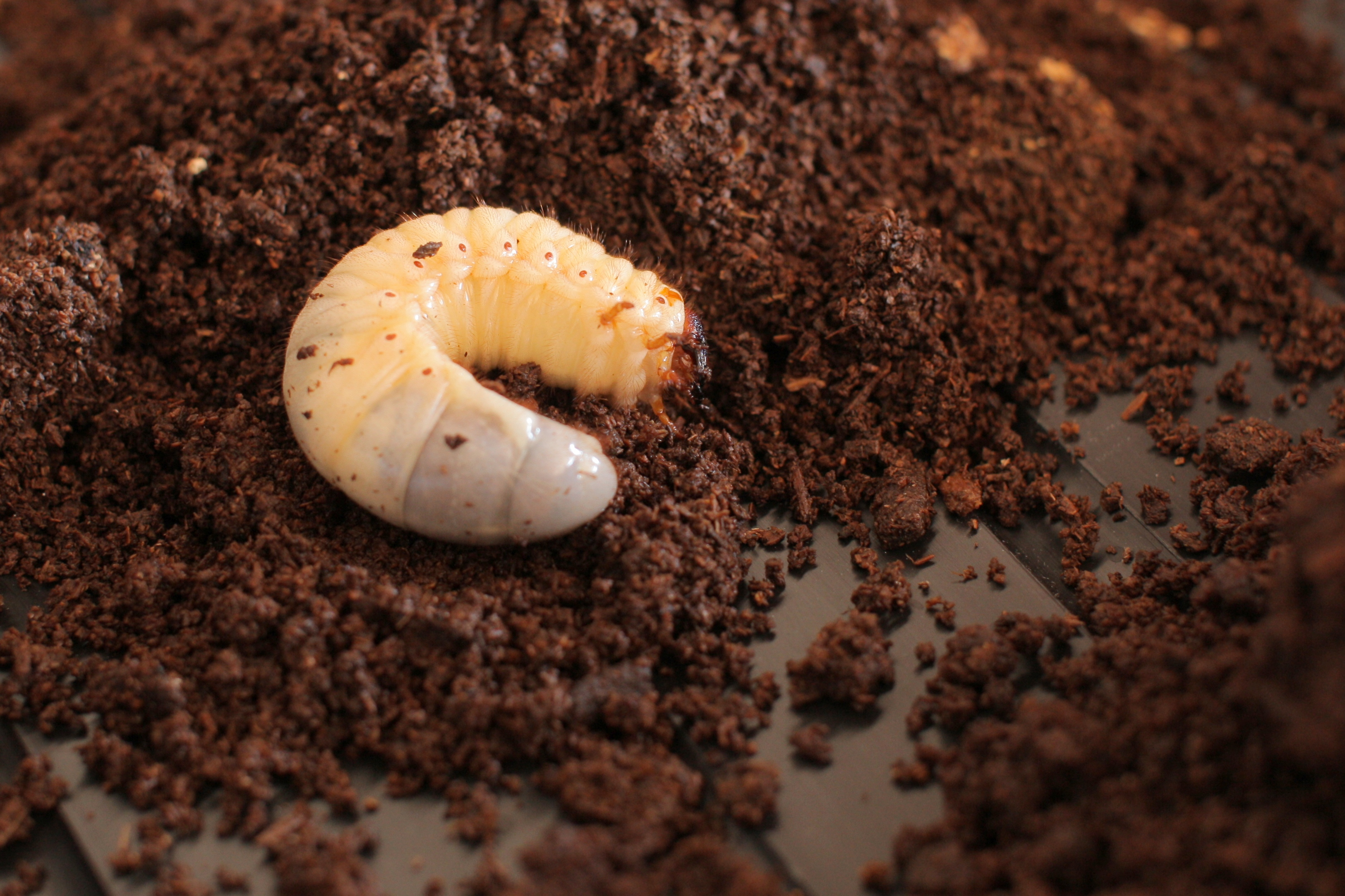
Third instar larva (last step before metamorphosis)

Female T. dichotomus beetles oviposit by scattering their eggs in the humus portion of soil during July and September. The larvae feed on the humus, develop into the third instar phase and pupate during June-July of the following year. Adult beetles emerge from the soil in the few months after pupating. It takes T. dichotomus beetles 1 year to develop into adults after being laid as eggs.

== Larval behavior ==
=== Chemical cues ===
Larval aggregation in T. dichotomus is driven by chemical cues. The larvae in this species burrow into the dirt, so chemical and acoustic cues are more relevant than visual cues. Studies have shown that chemical cues are necessary for larvae gathering. Larvae with nonfunctioning chemosensory organs cannot aggregate, so chemical cues are likely an important signal guiding larval aggregation. Notably, first instar larvae do not aggregate with other larvae because they demonstrate cannibalistic tendencies at this stage. Second and third instar larvae are not cannibalistic, so they aggregate normally. These larvae also do not discriminate based on kinship when they group. They will group at conspecific larvae but do not demonstrate preferences based on shared genetic similarities.

Mature larvae have been shown to construct pupal cells close to groups of larvae that are already living in the soil. These larvae recognize chemicals produced by other larvae and use these signals to determine where they will make their pupation site. One main benefit of grouping is an increase in diet quality for the larvae. Increase larval activities, like ingesting humus or burrowing, increase symbiotic microorganism activity in the nearby soil. This increase in symbiotic microorganism activity creates a more nutritious diet for the larvae to consume. Two potential costs of group living in these larvae include increased risk of fungal epidemic and increased risk of predation. Metarhizium fungal infection is lethal for T. dichotomus larvae, and grouping together leaves the larvae more susceptible to infection. Mogera imaizumii are able to quickly detect and consume these larvae, so living together leave them more vulnerable to being consumed.

=== Burrowing ===
T. dichotomus larvae remain buried in the soil until they emerge to breed in the summer. Despite this behavior, the shape of this beetle is not well suited for burrowing. The transverse sectional diameter of the A. dichomota last instar larva is around 20 mm which creates resistance as the larvae move through the soil. To make up for this inefficiency, A. dichotoma developed a rotational burrowing technique. These larvae possess a C-shaped body, so they burrow into the ground by rotating and using their tails to kick soil upward. Kicking the soil up helps the larvae sink into the ground by fluidizing the soil, reducing resistance, and allowing them to burrow more effectively.

== Genetics ==
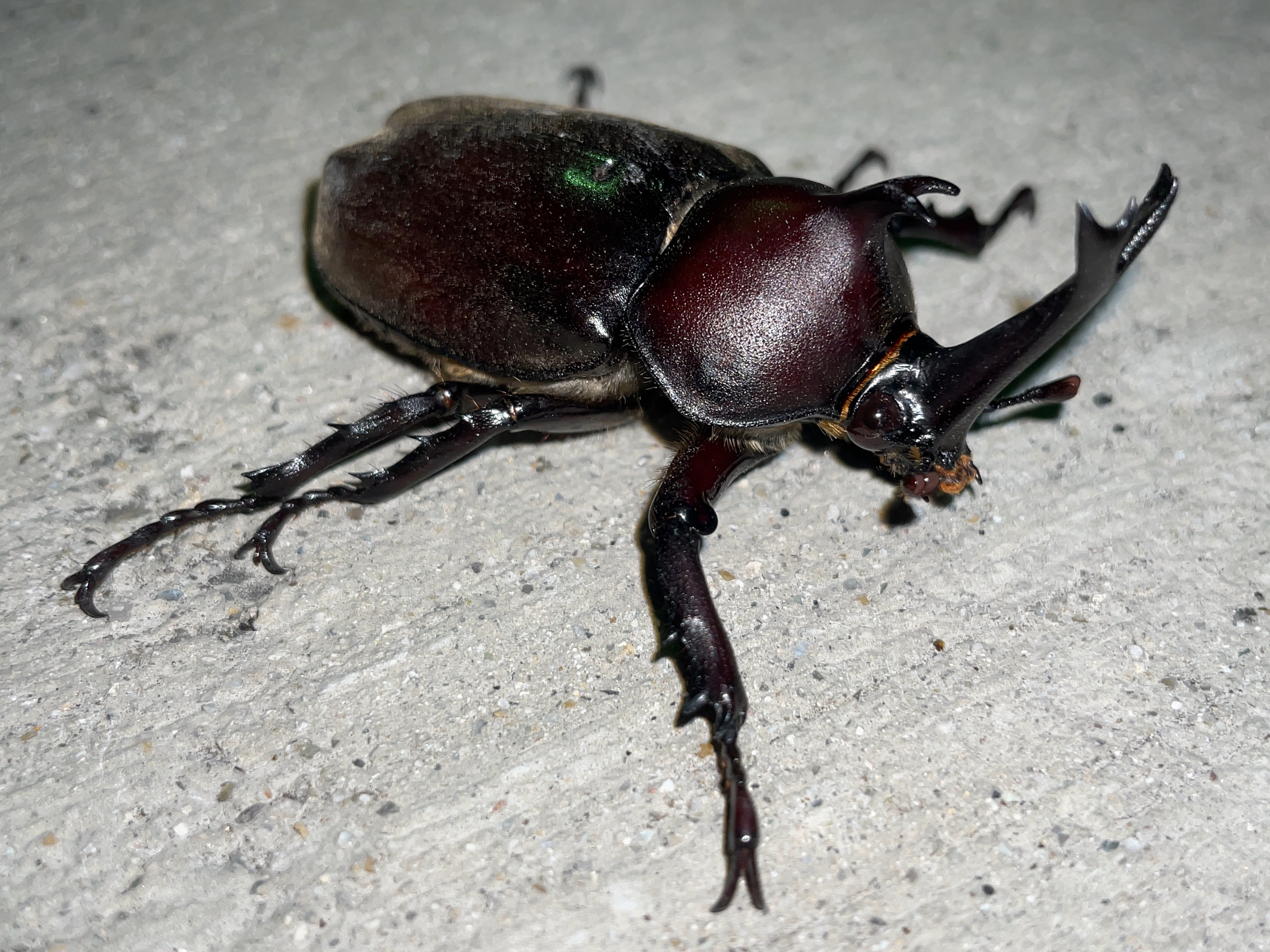
Male Japanese rhinoceros beetle

The horn found in male T. dichotomus is a well-studied example of an exaggerated trait that evolved through intrasexual selection. This horn is a sexually dimorphic trait, which means there must be a sex-determination gene involved in its development and evolution. The doublesex/Mab-3 related (DMRT) transcription factor family is a family of genes that are heavily involved in sexually dimorphic traits. These genes are evolutionarily conserved across many taxa, including worms, mammals, and beetles. The specific variant of doublesex implicated in the Japanese rhinoceros beetle is known as Td-dsx which stands for T. dichotomus dsx homologue. During development, alternative splicing of Td-dsx results in the formation of male and female isoforms of the gene. Td-dsx expression at the horn-forming area of the head increases during the prepupal stage, resulting in horn development in male T. dichotomus. Expression of male and female isoforms of Td-dsx increases during this time, but only the male isoform leads to horn growth. Knockdown of the male isoform of Td-dsx has shown to result in no horn growth in male Japanese rhinoceros beetles.

== Physiology ==
Japanese rhinoceros beetles have rounded pupal horns that have been shown to transform into an angular adult horn following adhesion and shrinkage-based stimuli. This occurs as a part of the beetles' natural metamorphosis as they come into a new exoskeletal morphogenesis. The mechanical mechanisms underlying such a physiological transformation are still relatively unstudied and unknown, but researchers have confirmed that physical stimulation causes pupal remodeling in Japanese rhinoceros beetles. It is entirely possible that a similar mechanism exists in closely related species, which would indicate a genetic underpinning to the morphological mechanism. It is thought that cell division and internal pressure are contributing factors to the alterations of epithelial layers after ecdysis.

== Mating ==
=== Male-male interactions ===
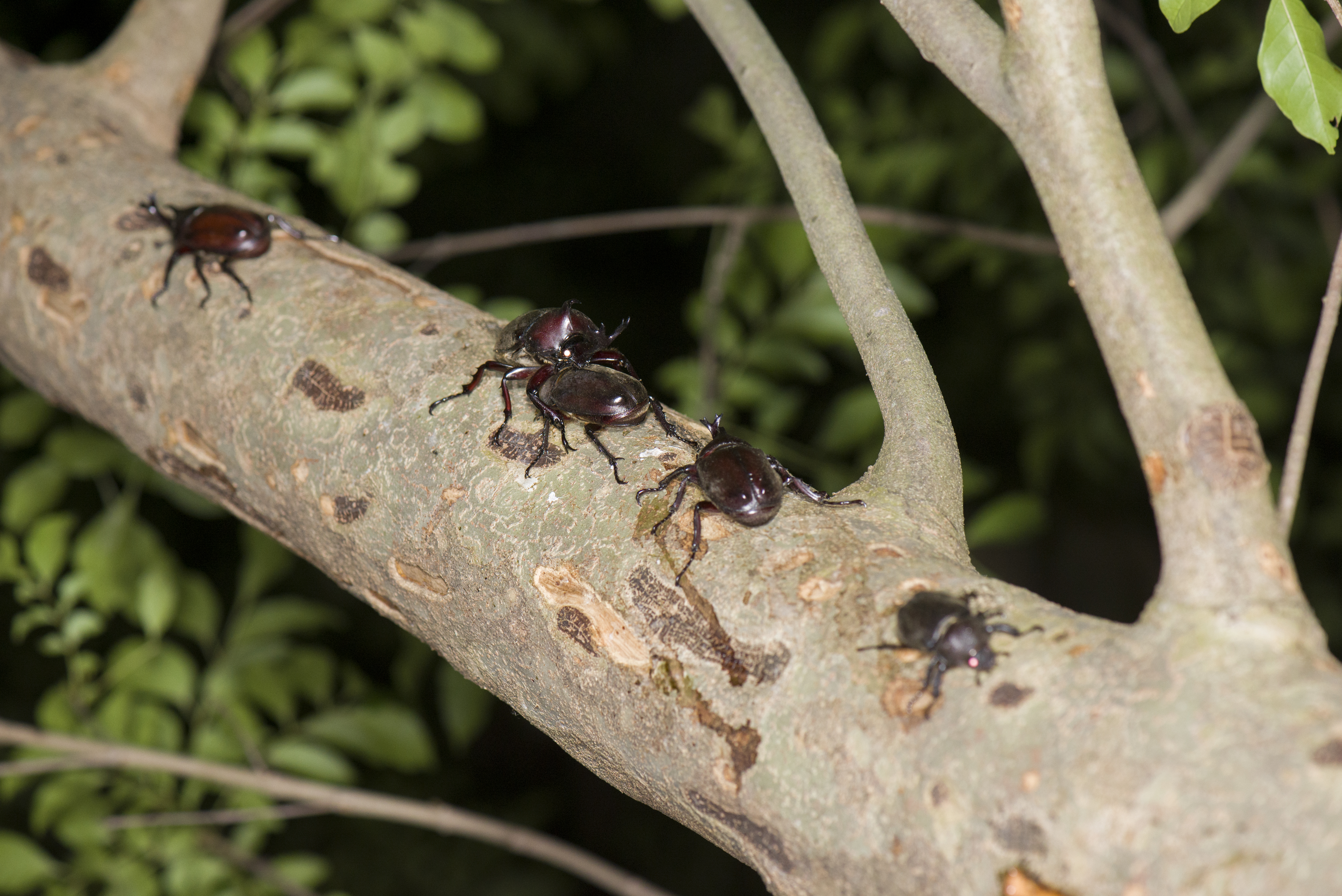
Male Japanese rhinoceros beetles fighting

T. dichotomaus are well known for their male aggressive behavior. Males will often use their large horns to fight other males over territory and the access to female Japanese rhinoceros beetles. These beetles will often fight on the trunks of host trees to determine who will keep or gain the territory. The goal of these fights is to uproot the opposition and either throw the other male onto their back or off the tree outright. This aggressive behavior has been broken down into four stages.

==== Stage 1 ====
This stage is known as the encounter, and consists of two males seeing each other but not yet making physical contact.

==== Stage 2 ====
This stage is known as shoving, and occurs when the males make physical contact and begin to shove each other with their horns. This stage is the most important because the beetles will analyze each other. At this time, each beetle will figure out the size of the opponent and decide if they want to fight or flee.

==== Stage 3 ====
This stage is known as prying. At this point, the males will use their horns to try and flip the other onto their backs. The battling beetles will proceed to step 4a or 4b depending on the size differences.

==== Stage 4 ====
Stage 4 consists of 4a and 4b. During stage 4a, known as chasing, if the horn length and/or body size is considerably large, the larger male will chase after the smaller one. The smaller male will retreat. During stage 4b, known as flipping, if the horn length and/or body size is small or negligible, the beetles will fight until one is flipped. This process takes considerably more time and energy than stage 4a.

=== Sneak-like behavior ===
Smaller T. dichotomus can make use of alternative reproductive behaviors to circumvent horn-to-horn combat. One of these alternative behaviors has been described as "sneak-like behavior" of which there are three variations. The first sneak-like behavior occurs when a male approaches another male from behind while the latter male has already assumed a mounted position on a female. The former beetle will try to use its horn to separate the latter beetle from the female. The second situation occurs when a male approaches another male while the latter male is positioned face-to-face with a female. In this case, the former male will attempt to mount the female. The third type of sneak-like behavior occurs when two males are fighting over a female and a third male attempts to mount the female.

=== Female-female interactions ===
Female T. dichotomus do not possess nearly as long horns as their male counterparts, but they still possess a noticeable horn, nonetheless. Although females of this species do not participate in the same shoving and throwing behaviors that the males do, they still exhibit some intrasexual aggressive behaviors. Female T. dichotomus have been observed using their smaller cephalic horns to head-butt other females in the area. They do so to fight over territory and access to food. Larger females have an advantage when it comes to this fighting behavior. Similarly to male T. dichotomus, smaller females developed a sneaky, non-confrontational strategy to gain access to resources and reproduce. Once defeated, smaller females will mount a larger female. The mounted female and mounting female rarely fight, and the mounting female will be able to access resources, including food and males.

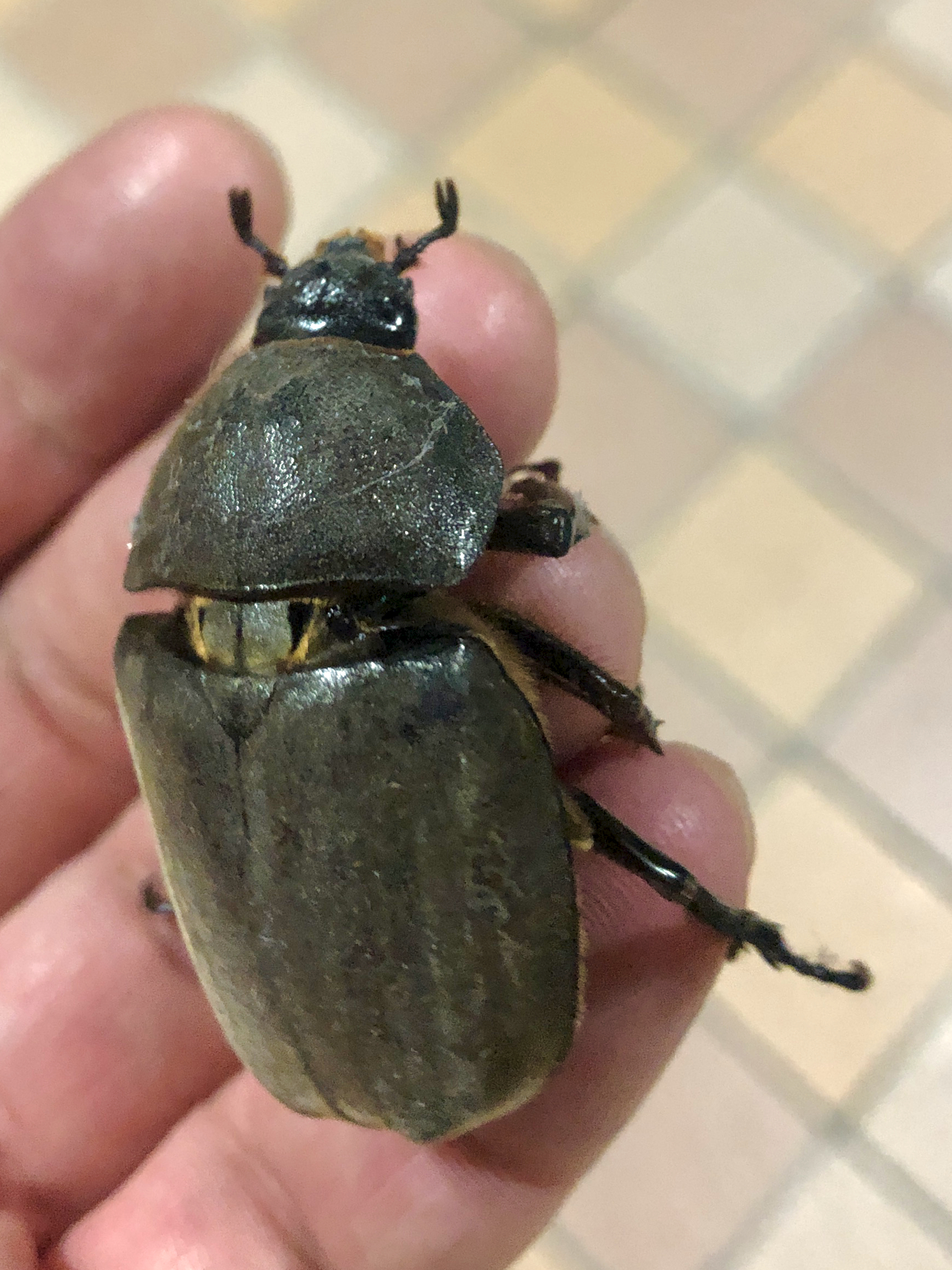
Female Japanese rhinoceros beetle in hand

== Sexual selection ==
Sexual selection on Japanese rhinoceros beetles has been extensively studied so far as to elucidate the mechanisms by which weapons of sexual selection diverge and evolve more rapidly than other body parts. From an ecological perspective and a reproductive perspective, different populations of Japanese rhinoceros beetles differ greatly in relative horn size. It's known that rhinoceros beetles with larger horns win fights against other male competitors and have better reproductive success. Thus, research on local habitat conditions and breeding ecology has uncovered that sexual selection strength across populations could be the key step in better understanding mating dynamics and sexual selection patterns in diverse Japanese rhinoceros beetle populations.

== Sexual dimorphisms ==
With regards to sexual dimorphisms, Japanese rhinoceros beetles suffer male-biased predation by both avian predators and mammalian predators. It was discovered that sexually selected traits impose an increased risk of predation on male Japanese rhinoceros beetles and on larger individuals of both sexes. Researchers identified such a mechanism with raccoon dogs and jungle crows as predators. Interestingly, predation might act as a stabilizing selection pressure acting against the exaggeration and excessive evolution/propagation of male sexual traits. The prominent horn on the males makes this species a popular model organism for the study of sexual dimorphic traits.

== Intra-species competition ==
Body size and horn length are both important factors in determining the winner when male A. dichotoma fight. The male horn size is the most important factor used to predict the winner of these fights, but a larger horn is not always best. A male T. dichotomus with a large body benefits from a larger horn so it can fight other males for access to females. The main reproductive strategy of these larger beetles is combat. The same is not true for smaller Japanese rhinoceros beetles which prefer less confrontational strategies like sneaking. In this case, the smaller beetle will prefer a smaller horn, so it is more mobile and better able to infiltrate the larger male's territory while it is preoccupied. Therefore, horn length can be used as a metric for measuring the fighting ability of a male Japanese rhinoceros beetle, but it is not as useful to use as a measure of reproductive ability.

Studies have shown that there is wide variation in male horn lengths, which indicates that a single horn length is not selected for over others. A large horn is useful for fighting but acts as a hindrance when the beetle digs into nearby litter to hide during the day. The large horn has shown to reduce the efficiency of this digging behavior, which leaves the beetle vulnerable to predators. Larger horns also impair flight, making it more difficult for Japanese rhinoceros beetles to move closer to potential mates. Other studies have shown that larger horns may be more fragile than smaller horns. Severe injuries sustained by beetles with larger horns resulted in some of these beetles losing their horns, while similar injuries in beetles with smaller horns did not.

== Feeding resources ==
Larval nutrition has a strong effect on overall growth in T. dichotomus. Poor nutritional environments in the larval stage leads to decreased growth rate, which can prolong the larval period. T. dichotomus are univoltine and only produce one brood during the three summer months. If the larval period is extended for too long, the beetle can miss its breeding window, which would severely harm its individual fitness. Low nutrition levels in the larval stage are also correlated with decreased adult size of the eyes, wings, elytra, and wings in male and female Japanese rhinoceros beetles. Genitalia, however, are not affected by nutrition levels. Males produced similarly sized genitalia regardless of nutrition levels in the larval stage. Mating and fertilization were similarly unaffected. Contrary to genitalia development in males, the male cephalic and thoracic horns are incredibly sensitive to larval nutrition levels. Low nutrition levels are associated with a 50% decrease in thoracic horn length and a 60% decrease in cephalic horn length.

== Interactions with humans ==
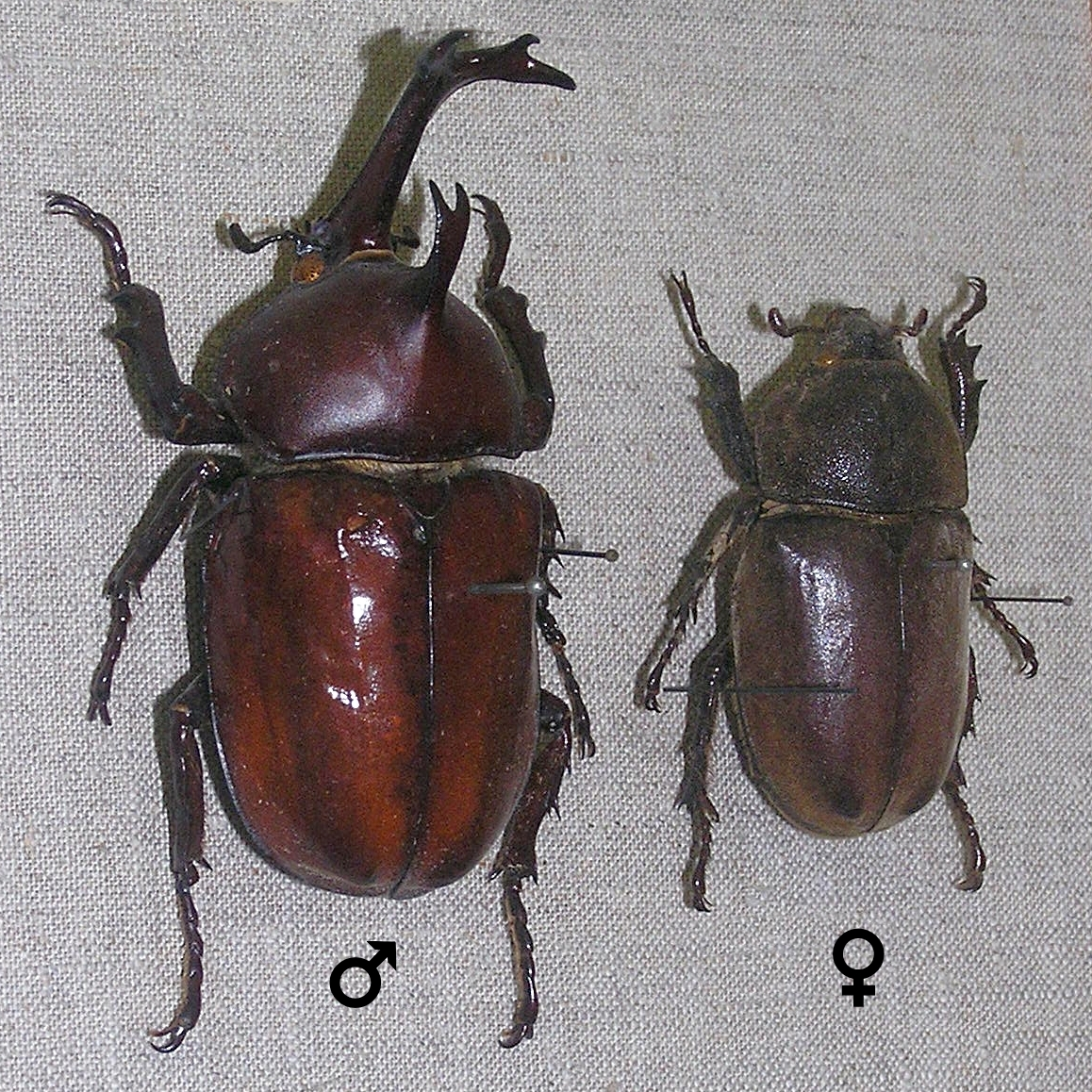
Male and female side by side comparison

=== Pets ===
Rhinoceros beetles are a popular pet in Japan; in the past, they would be gathered from the wild, though in recent years beetles have also been bred in captivity. Their small size and easy upkeep compared to a mammal pet has made them popular.

=== Research applications ===
T. dichotomus is a useful model organism for scientific research in insects. It is easy and convenient to set up a breeding system for these beetles in the laboratory. Breeding the beetles and culturing the progeny is a well-documented process. The Japanese rhinoceros beetle can also be bred using a soil-free apparatus which allows for non-invasive and uninterrupted monitoring of growth and development. These larvae are also easy to preserve because they can be kept at low temperatures to prevent pupation from occurring. This added element of control makes these beetles convenient to use for research purposes throughout the year. RNA interference protocols have also been developed for A. dichotomus, so it is easy to conduct experiments on genes of interest. This species of beetle is also very large, so large amounts of DNA and RNA can be extracted from a single beetle for use in sequencing analysis. T. dichotomus has become a particularly popular model organism because of its horn. The horn developmental pathways and mechanism have been thoroughly studied. A protein with antibacterial properties has been discovered in A. dichotomus, alongside a molecule with potential anti-prion activity. A. dichotoma has proven to be a useful model organism for research in fields including drug discovery, ethology, behavioral ecology, and evolutionary developmental biology.

=== Use in medicine ===
The use of Japanese rhinoceros beetles in traditional Chinese medicine inspired research studies to corroborate its use. To the surprise of many researchers, compounds found in the extracts of A. dichotoma larvae have proven to exhibit anti-obesity effects as well as antibiotic properties. T. dichotomus has been a popular ingredient in Chinese traditional medicine for almost 2000 years. Research has corroborated that T. dichotomus extracts have potential health benefits. A study has shown that A. dichotomus larvae extract can significantly decrease the expression of genes associated with fat creation. The study implies that Japanese rhinoceros beetle larvae could function as a potential food source to counteract obesity. Another study discovered two proteins in T. dichotomus larva which exhibited antibacterial activity. These proteins are named A. d. coleoptericin A and B, with A. d being an abbreviation for T. dichotomus. A. d. coleoptericin A and B demonstrate significant activity against methicillin resistant Staphylococcus aureus (MRSA), a notoriously difficult strain of bacteria to treat with antibiotics.

T. dichotomus larvae are known to consume rotting wood and fruits, so it is hypothesized that these larvae are capable of producing phytochemicals. Phytochemicals are natural bioactive compounds that provide resistance to bacterial and viral infections. Researchers were interested in investigating the potential health benefits associated with these larvae and found that A. dichotoma extract contains moderate antioxidant properties. Compounds found in the larvae extract are capable of scavenging for free oxygen radicals and prevent harmful oxidation in the body. The demand for natural substances that can reduce biological toxicity and food deterioration has risen due to synthetic alternatives causing harm to humans. The Japanese rhinoceros beetle larvae extract has potential to serve as an aforementioned natural alternative.

=== Anti-prion activity ===
To this day, little is known about prion diseases. There is no cure and the mechanism by which normal proteins are converted to abnormal prion remains unknown. Substances found in the hemolymph of T. dichotomus have been shown to exhibit anti-prion activity once they are browned or heated for an extended period of time. Administration of heated hemolymph has been shown to reduce abnormal prion protein levels in prion-infected cells. This compound has yet to be identified but is hypothesized to be a Maillard reaction product. Previous studies have shown that some Maillard reaction products are involved in the post-translational modification of prions. This compound in the hemolymph of T. dichotomus demonstrates strain-dependent anti-prion activity, as it only reduces prion formation in RML prion-infected cells.

=== In popular culture ===
Insects are a prominent part of Japanese video games. Japanese rhinoceros beetles has been referenced in popular role-playing games like Dragon Quest, which includes three monsters that resemble T. dichotomus. It has also been referenced in animated series as vehicles. In Mega Man X3, a maverick boss by the name of Gravity Beetle that the player fights against was modeled after the rhinoceros beetle. The beetle also appeared in Mushihimesama, a shooting-game where enemies are oversized insects. The main character befriends a large rhinoceros beetle and uses it to defeat enemy insects. Another game that featured the beetle is called Air. Air is a popular gal-gê game which features a female rhinoceros beetle. Miss Misuzu Kamio, the game's main character, befriends this beetle at the beginning of the game and brings it along with her throughout the rest of the story. A. dichotoma is an iconic insect that can be found throughout Japanese culture. In Time Bokan, an anime from the late 1970s, the main characters possessed a time machine which resembled a rhinoceros beetle. This vehicle possessed the iconic cephalic horn found on male T. dichotomus and had wheels instead of legs.

=== As a food resource ===
T. dichotomus larvae are edible and are reported to have a high value for nutritional content. The larvae of this species is commonly eaten throughout East Asia. Although there are benefits associated with the consumption of the larvae, many people are deterred from eating them because of their distinctly unpalatable flavor. The primary volatiles that are associated with these flavors are indoles. Several studies have investigated methods to improve the flavor profile of T. dichotomus larvae. One study found that the use of yeast fermentation to process larva powder could reduce the effect of the unpalatable indole profile and also increase the effects of volatiles that are traditionally associated with fruit-like flavors. Another study found that lactic acid fermentation via bacteria could also improve the flavor profiles of the larvae.
