= Strategus mormon =

Scientific classification
- Kingdom: Animalia
- Phylum: Arthropoda
- Class: Insecta
- Order: Coleoptera
- Suborder: Polyphaga
- Infraorder: Scarabaeiformia
- Family: Scarabaeidae
- Genus: Strategus
- Species: S. mormon

Binomial name
- Strategus mormon Burmeister, 1847

Species of beetle

Strategus mormon is a species of rhinoceros beetle in the family Scarabaeidae.
