= Strategus cessus =

Scientific classification
- Domain: Eukaryota
- Kingdom: Animalia
- Phylum: Arthropoda
- Class: Insecta
- Order: Coleoptera
- Suborder: Polyphaga
- Infraorder: Scarabaeiformia
- Family: Scarabaeidae
- Genus: Strategus
- Species: S. cessus

Binomial name
- Strategus cessus Leconte, 1866

Synonyms
- Anastrategus cavicauda Casey, 1915; Anastrategus durangoensis Casey, 1915; Anastrategus inflatus Casey, 1915; Anastrategus tantalus Casey, 1915; Strategus beckeri Kolbe, 1906

Species of beetle

Strategus cessus is a species of rhinoceros beetle in the family Scarabaeidae.
