= Alissonotum piceum =

Scientific classification
- Kingdom: Animalia
- Phylum: Arthropoda
- Class: Insecta
- Order: Coleoptera
- Suborder: Polyphaga
- Infraorder: Scarabaeiformia
- Family: Scarabaeidae
- Genus: Alissonotum
- Species: A. piceum

Binomial name
- Alissonotum piceum (Fabricius, 1775)

Synonyms
- Scarabaeus piceus Fabricius, 1775; Geotrupes piceus Fabricius, 1801; Heteronychus piceum Burmeister, 1847; Phileurus detractus Walker, 1859; Alissonotum piceum Arrow, 1910

Species of beetle

Alissonotum piceum is a species of rhinoceros beetle found in India, Sri Lanka, Myanmar, Bangladesh, Pakistan, Réunion island and Mauritius.

== Biology ==
Male genitalia consists with elongated phallobase, slender and oval paramere and much outward prolonged apex. Aedeagus is about 3.65 mm in size.

Both adult and grub are found in the furrows and the sugarcane setts. Sometimes they bore through the shoot bases. The species is known to parasitized by Tiphia parallela.

Three subspecies are recorded: Alissonotum piceum piceum, (Fabricius, 1775), Alissonotum piceum besucheti, Endrödi, 1977. and Allissonotum piceum krombeini, Endrödi, 1976
