= Strategus splendens =

Scientific classification
- Domain: Eukaryota
- Kingdom: Animalia
- Phylum: Arthropoda
- Class: Insecta
- Order: Coleoptera
- Suborder: Polyphaga
- Infraorder: Scarabaeiformia
- Family: Scarabaeidae
- Genus: Strategus
- Species: S. splendens

Binomial name
- Strategus splendens (Palisot de Beauvois, 1809)

Synonyms
- Anastrategus carolinensis Casey, 1915; Anastrategus cognatus Casey, 1915; Scarabaeus boscii Palisot de Beauvois, 1809

Species of beetle

Strategus splendens is a species of rhinoceros beetle in the family Scarabaeidae.
