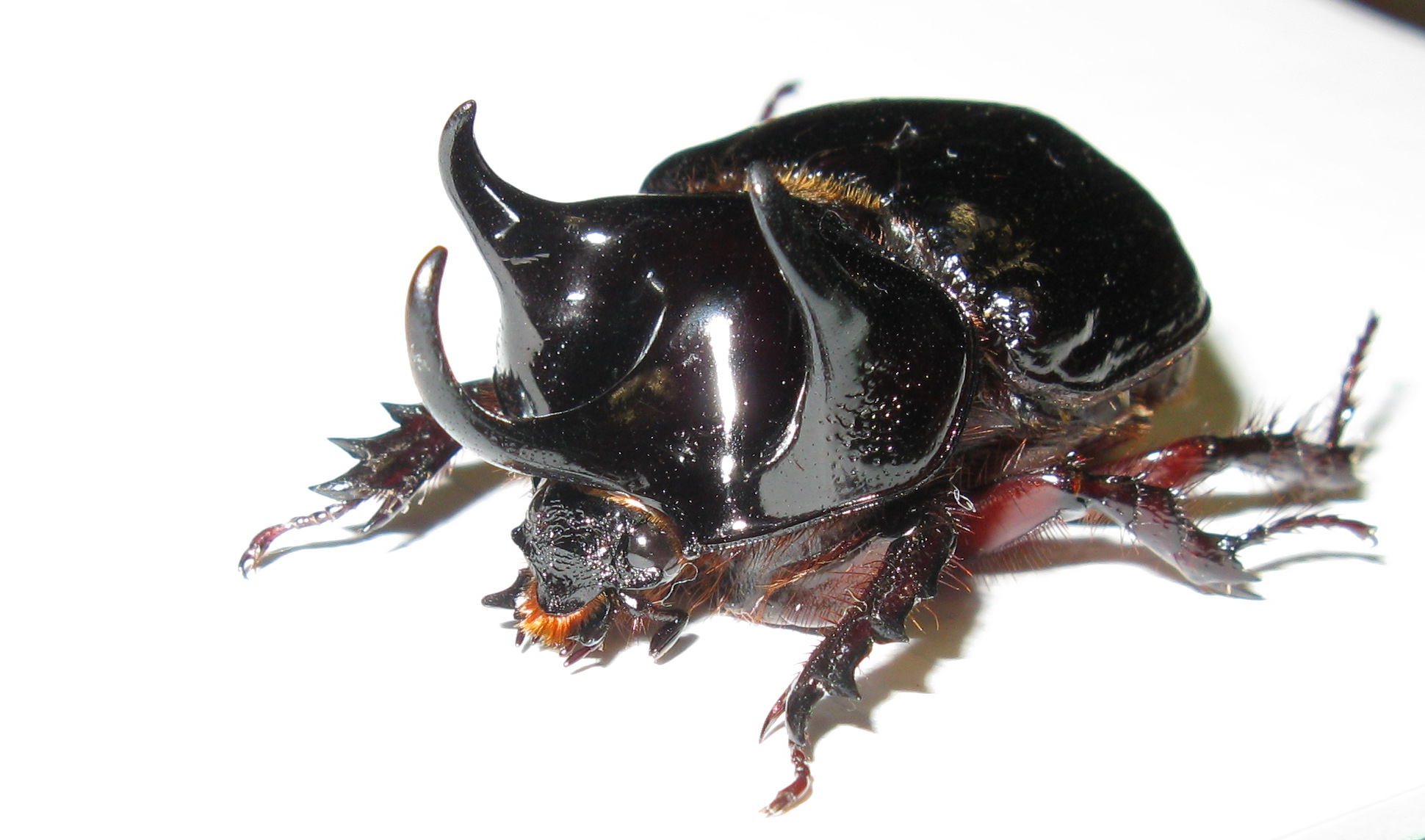

Scientific classification
- Domain: Eukaryota
- Kingdom: Animalia
- Phylum: Arthropoda
- Class: Insecta
- Order: Coleoptera
- Suborder: Polyphaga
- Infraorder: Scarabaeiformia
- Family: Scarabaeidae
- Genus: Strategus
- Species: S. antaeus

Binomial name
- Strategus antaeus (Drury, 1773)

Synonyms
- Scarabaeus maimon Fabricius, 1775; Strategus atrolucens Casey, 1915; Strategus divergens Casey, 1915; Strategus houstonensis Knaus, 1925; Strategus pinorum Casey, 1915; Strategus semistriatus Casey, 1915; Strategus septentrionis Casey, 1915; Strategus sinuatus Casey, 1915

= Strategus antaeus =

Species of beetle

Strategus antaeus, the ox beetle, is a species of rhinoceros beetle in the family Scarabaeidae.

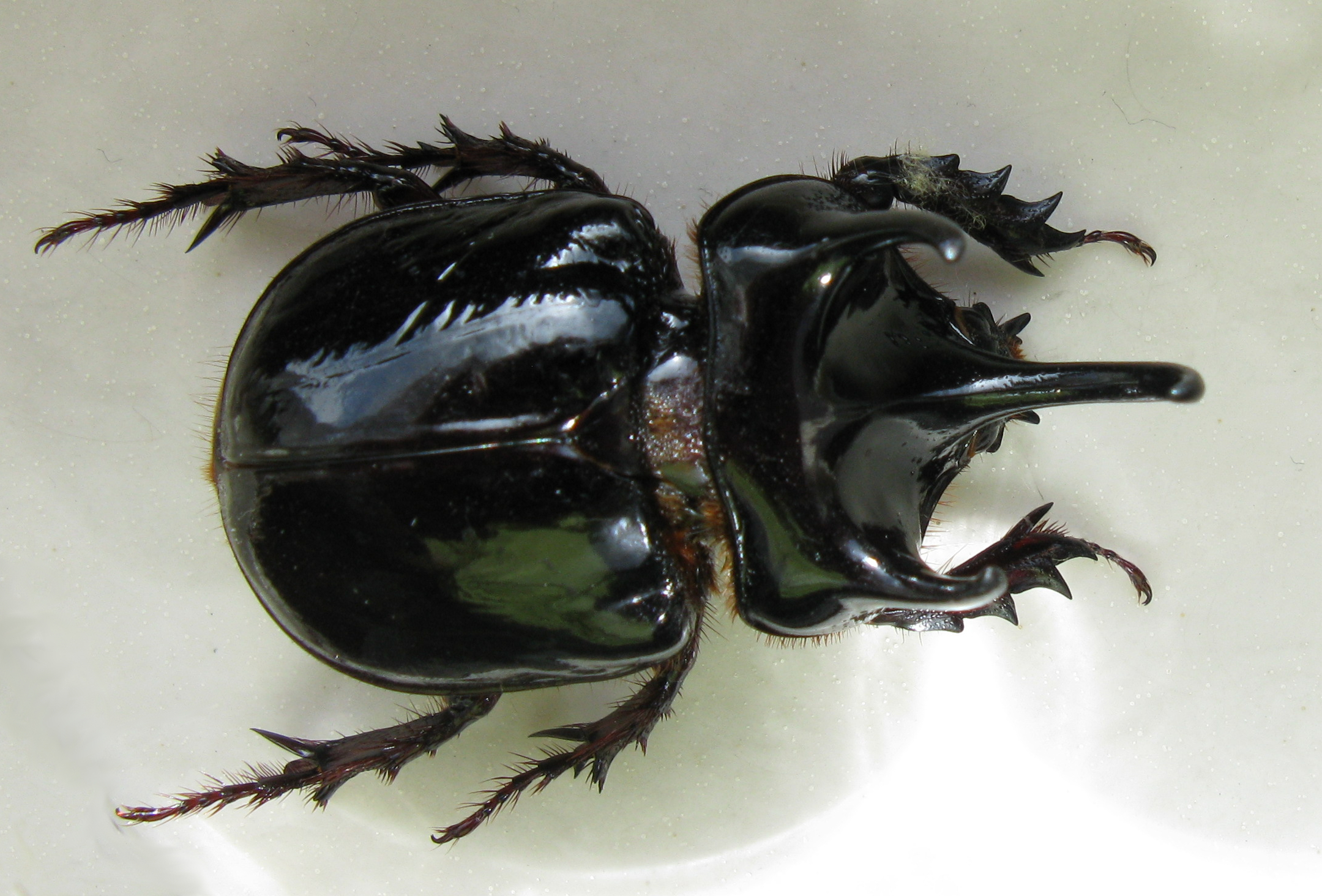
Ox beetle, Strategus antaeus

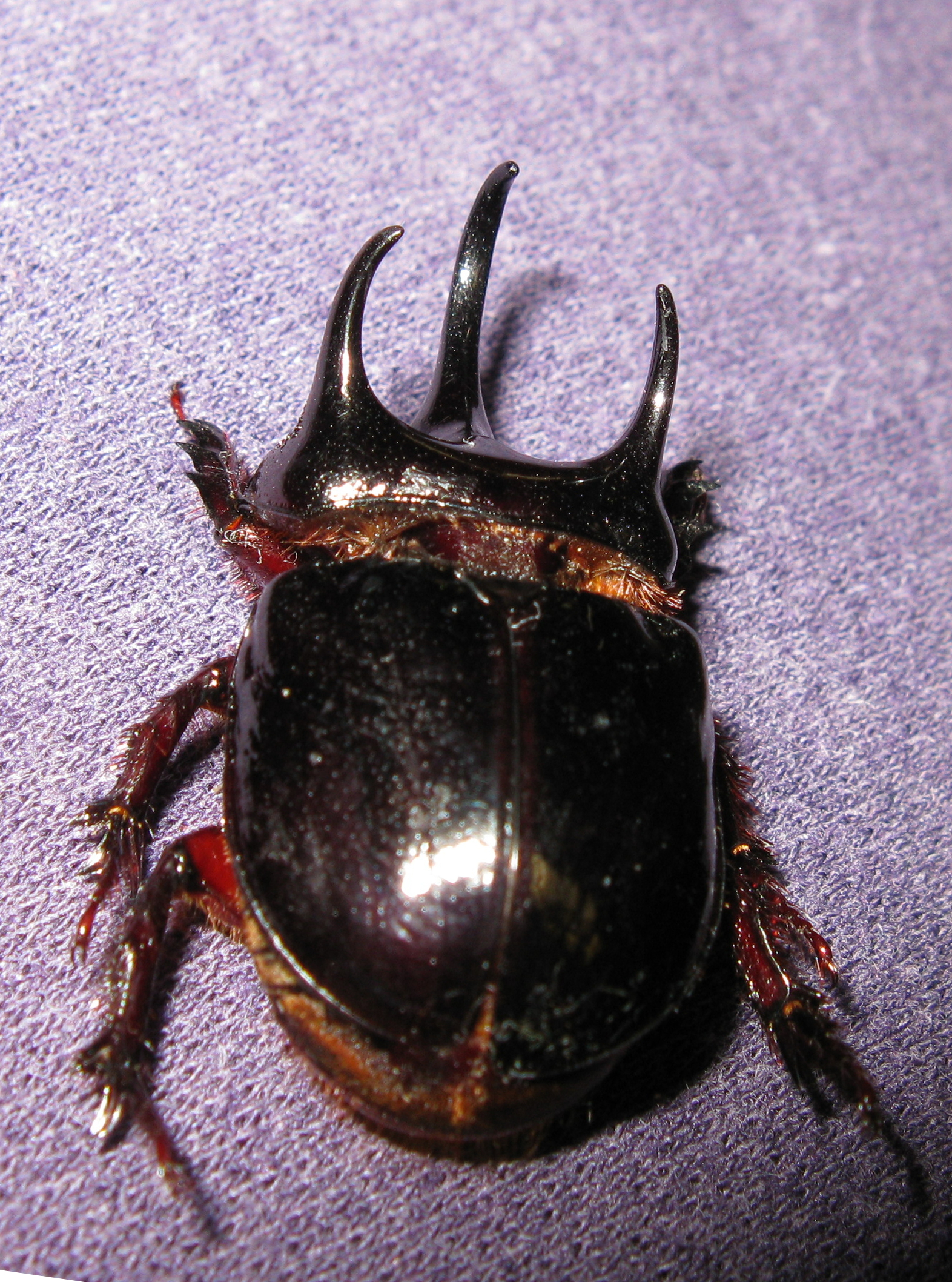
Ox beetle, Strategus antaeus
