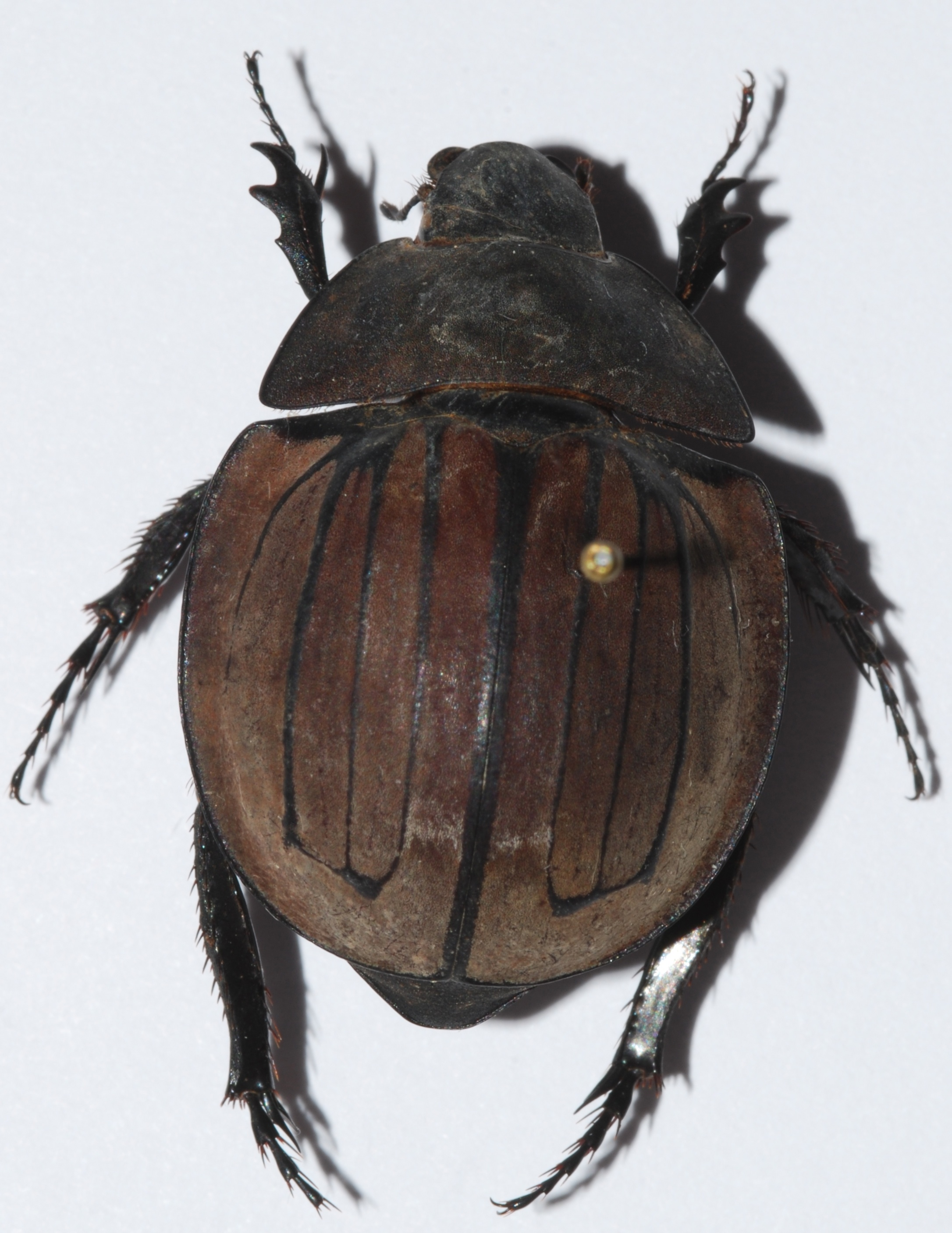
- Hexodon patella

Scientific classification
- Kingdom: Animalia
- Phylum: Arthropoda
- Clade: Pancrustacea
- Class: Insecta
- Order: Coleoptera
- Suborder: Polyphaga
- Infraorder: Scarabaeiformia
- Family: Scarabaeidae
- Subfamily: Dynastinae
- Tribe: Hexodontini; Lacoirdaire, 1856

= Hexodontini =

Tribe of beetles

Hexodontini is a tribe of rhinoceros beetles.

== Range ==
The tribe Hexodontini is restricted to Madagascar.

== Etymology ==
The tribe's name is derived from Greek, "hex" meaning "six" and "odont" meaning teeth.

== Taxonomy ==
The tribe Hexodontini contains the following 3 genera:

- Hexodon
- Hemicyrthus
- Hyboschema
