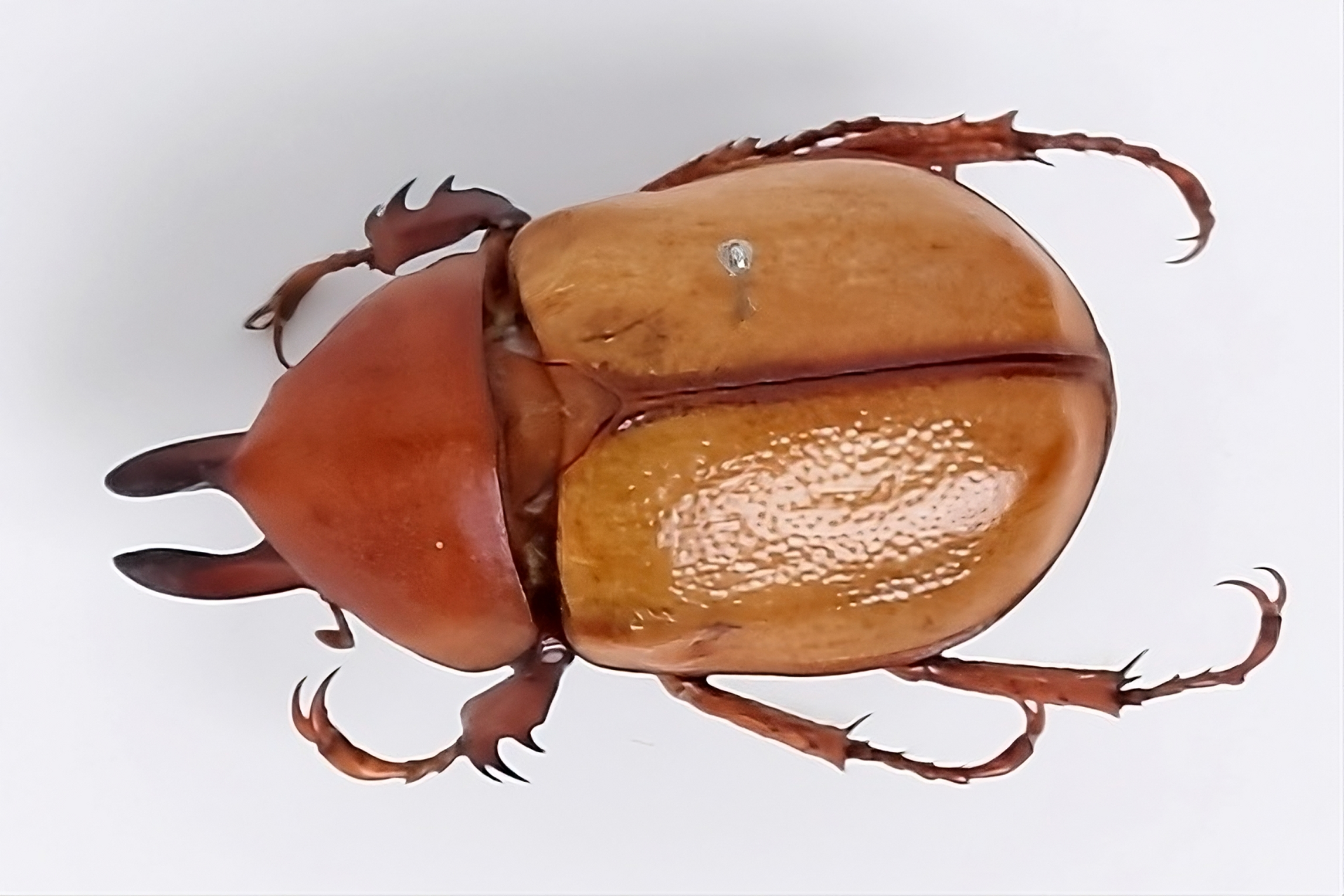
- An image of Agaocephala cornigera in the Natural History Museum

Scientific classification
- Kingdom: Animalia
- Phylum: Arthropoda
- Clade: Pancrustacea
- Class: Insecta
- Order: Coleoptera
- Suborder: Polyphaga
- Infraorder: Scarabaeiformia
- Family: Scarabaeidae
- Tribe: Agaocephalini
- Genus: Agaocephala; Le Peletier & Serville, 1828

= Agaocephala =

Genus of beetles

Agaocephala is a genus of insects belonging to the order Coleoptera and the subfamily Dynastinae. The genus contains nine species, including Agaocephala margaridae. This species lives in the South American neotropical realm regions of Brazil, specifically Para, Amazonas, Brazil.
