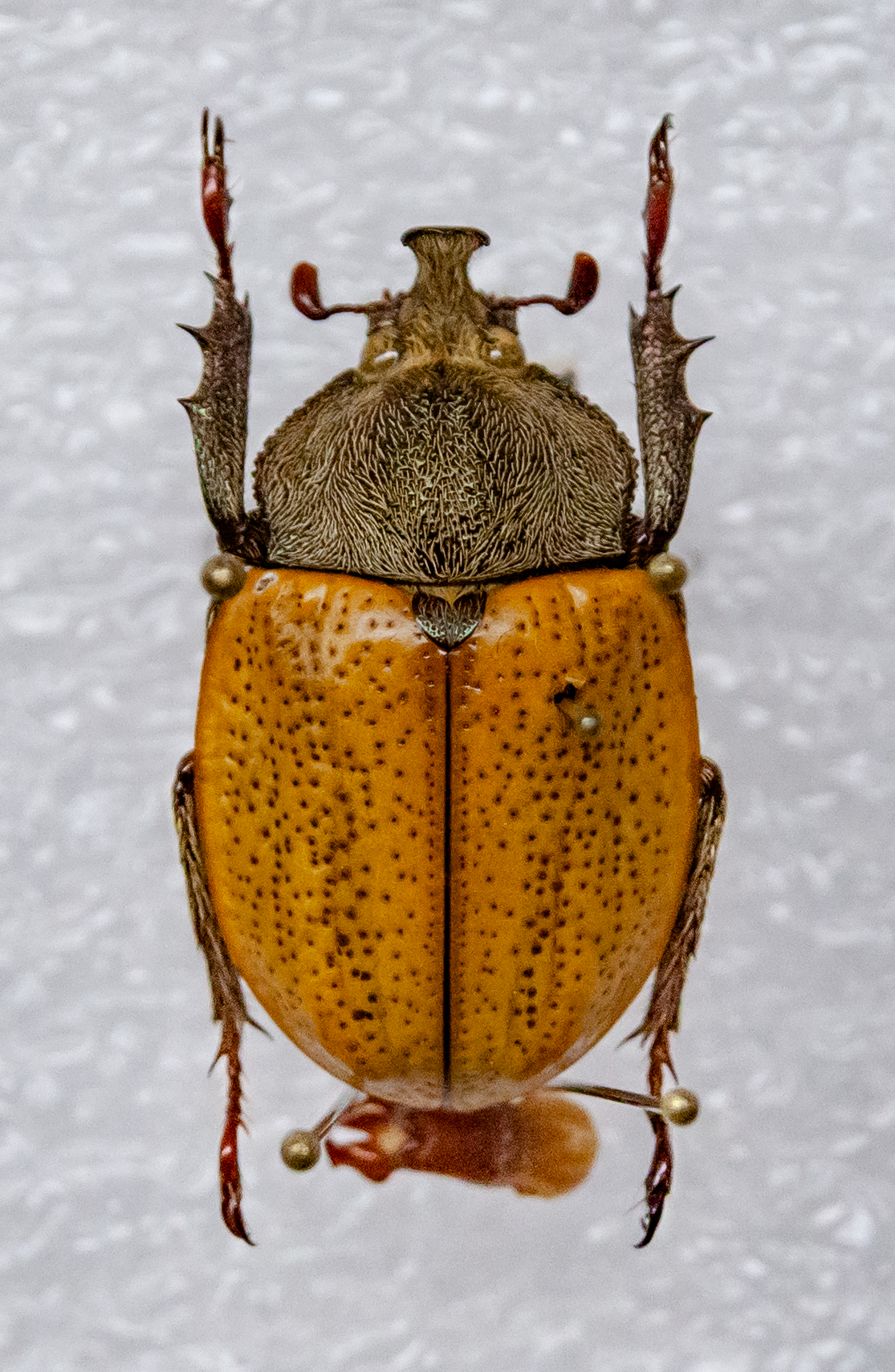

Scientific classification
- Domain: Eukaryota
- Kingdom: Animalia
- Phylum: Arthropoda
- Class: Insecta
- Order: Coleoptera
- Suborder: Polyphaga
- Infraorder: Scarabaeiformia
- Family: Scarabaeidae
- Subfamily: Dynastinae
- Tribe: Agaocephalini
- Genus: Antodon; Brême, 1845
- Species: A. goryi

Binomial name
- Antodon goryi (Laporte de Castelnau, 1832)

= Antodon =

Genus of beetles

Antodon is a monotypic genus of rhinoceros beetles in the tribe Agaocephalini, erected by Brême in 1845 and containing the species Antodon goryi recorded from Brazil and Ecuador.
