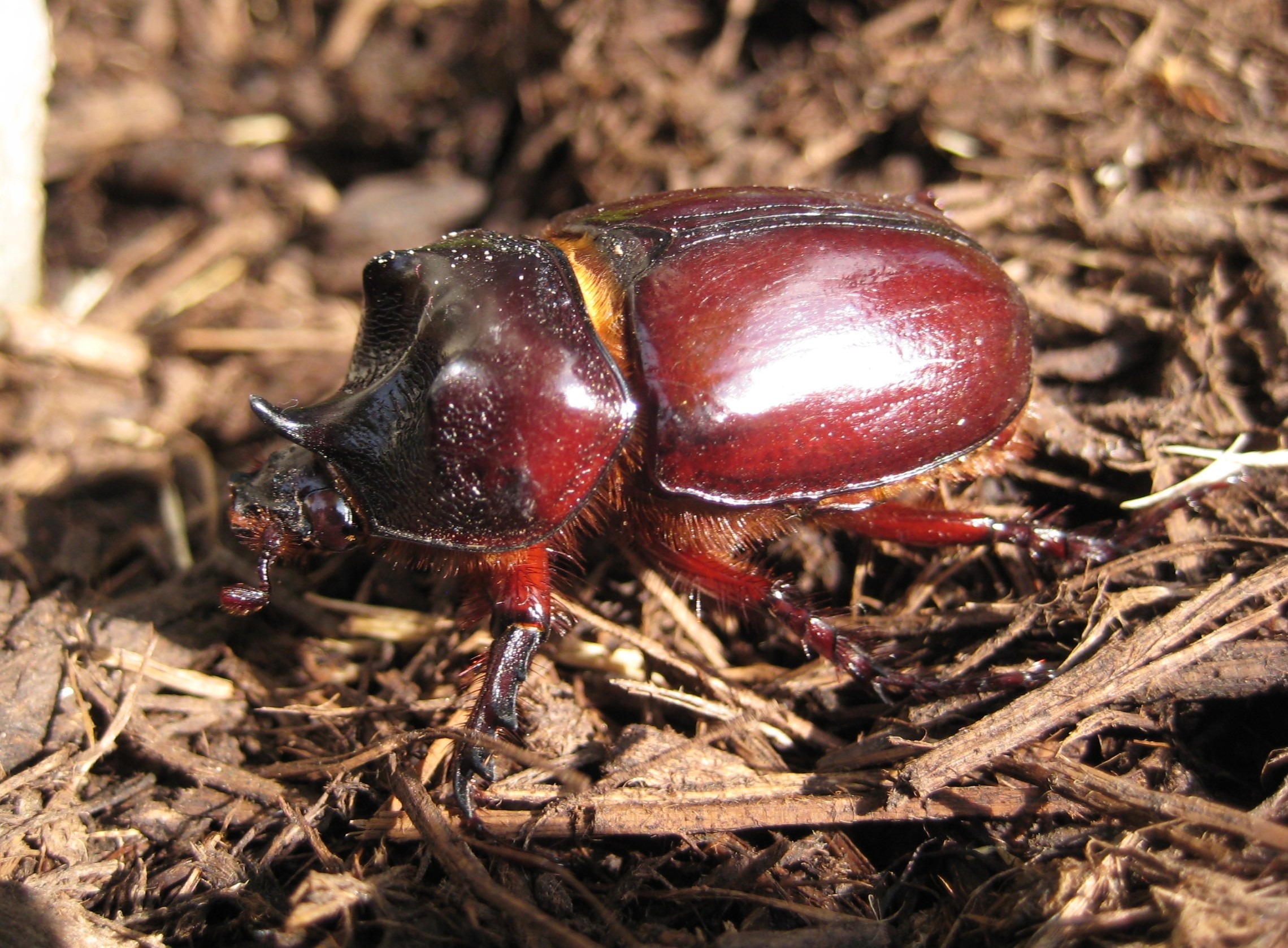
- Male Strategus aloeus

Scientific classification
- Kingdom: Animalia
- Phylum: Arthropoda
- Clade: Pancrustacea
- Class: Insecta
- Order: Coleoptera
- Suborder: Polyphaga
- Infraorder: Scarabaeiformia
- Family: Scarabaeidae
- Genus: Strategus
- Species: S. aloeus

Binomial name
- Strategus aloeus (Linnaeus, 1758)

= Strategus aloeus =

Species of beetle

Strategus aloeus, the ox beetle, is a species of rhinoceros beetle native to the Americas.

== Description ==
The "major" males of this species have three large horns on their thoraces, resembling Triceratops. The "minor" males have horns, as well, but the two back ones are small and the frontal horn is much shorter than the horn in major males. The female ox beetle has a very short horn which has little use in fighting, but is used for digging in the ground. These beetles grow to about 1.0 to 1.5 in (2.5 to 3.8 cm) long as adults when the horns are excluded in the males.

== Distribution ==
Although this species occurs in the southern United States, its populations are much higher in the Neotropical realm, throughout Mexico, the Caribbean, Central America and parts of South America.

== Breeding ==
The larvae of this species feed on roots in the ground, while the adults feed on flowers and all sorts of fruit. The larvae take around four to six months to reach the pupal stage. The pupal stage can be shortened in captivity by placing the pupae in a warm area. The adults are active from May to November, and during this time both males and females try to mate. These beetles are very common near lights in the summer and can be collected in large numbers in some areas. Their larvae are sometimes considered a pest because they can damage lawns and gardens by feeding on the roots.

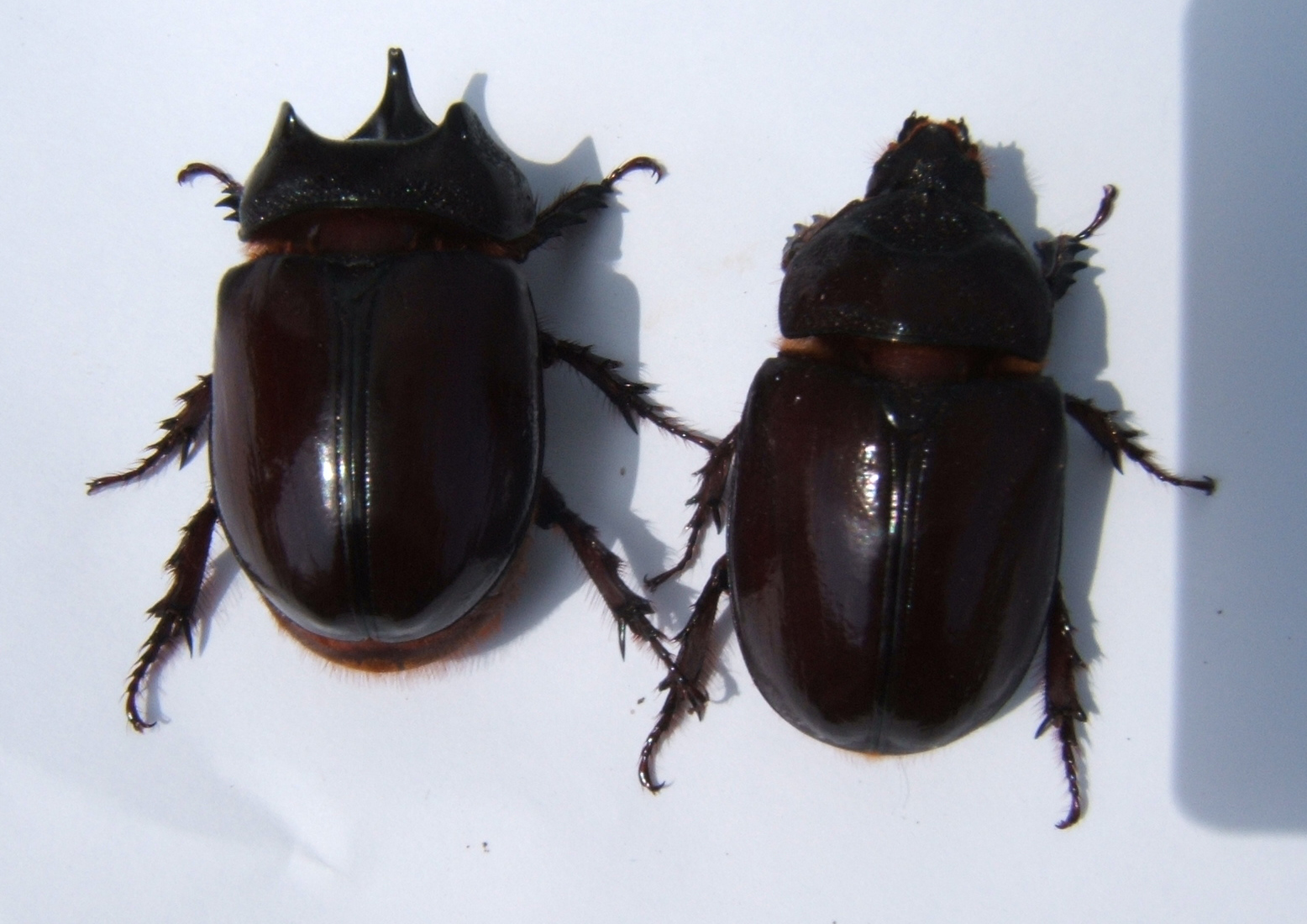
Ox beetle (male left, female right)

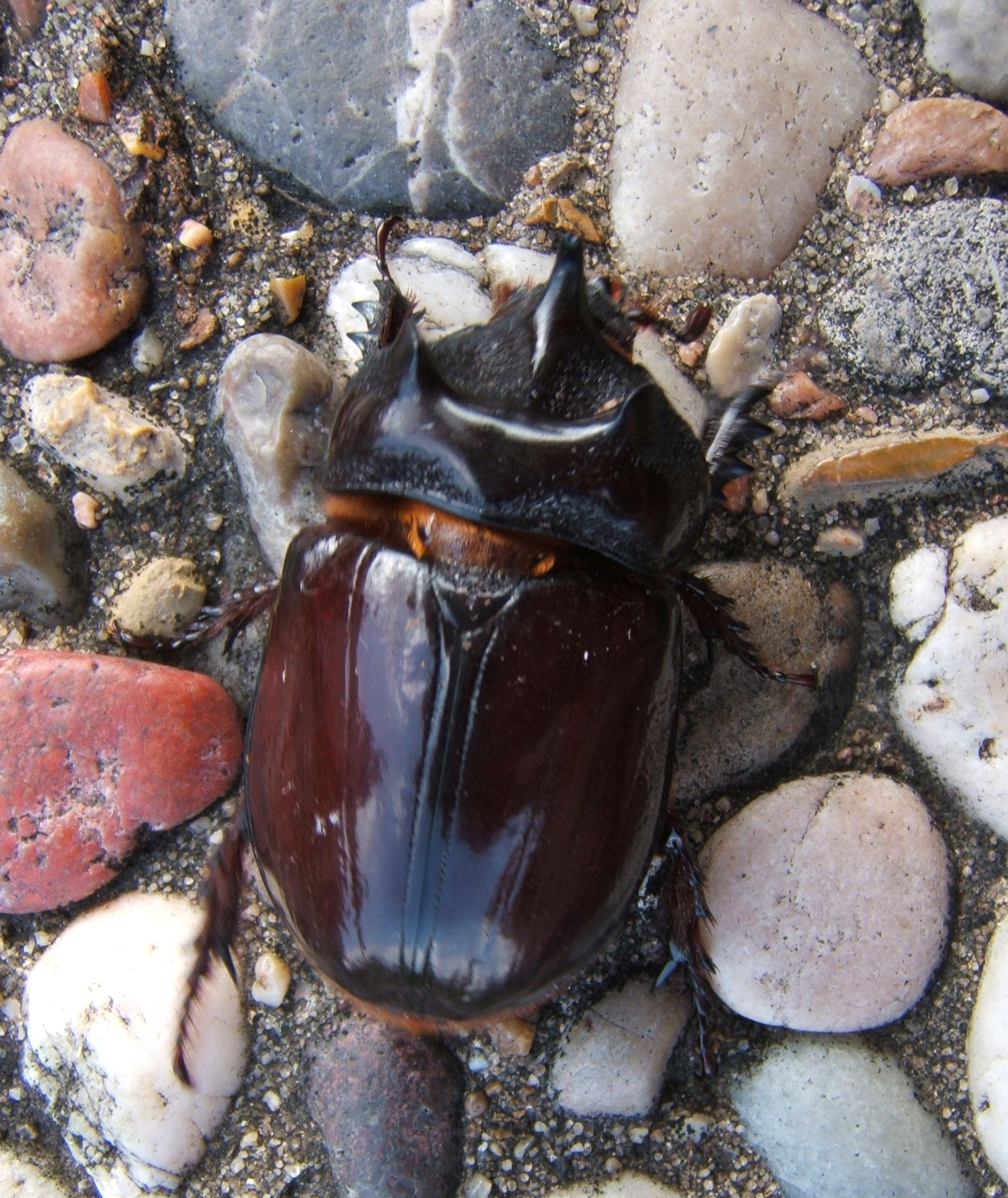
Adult male

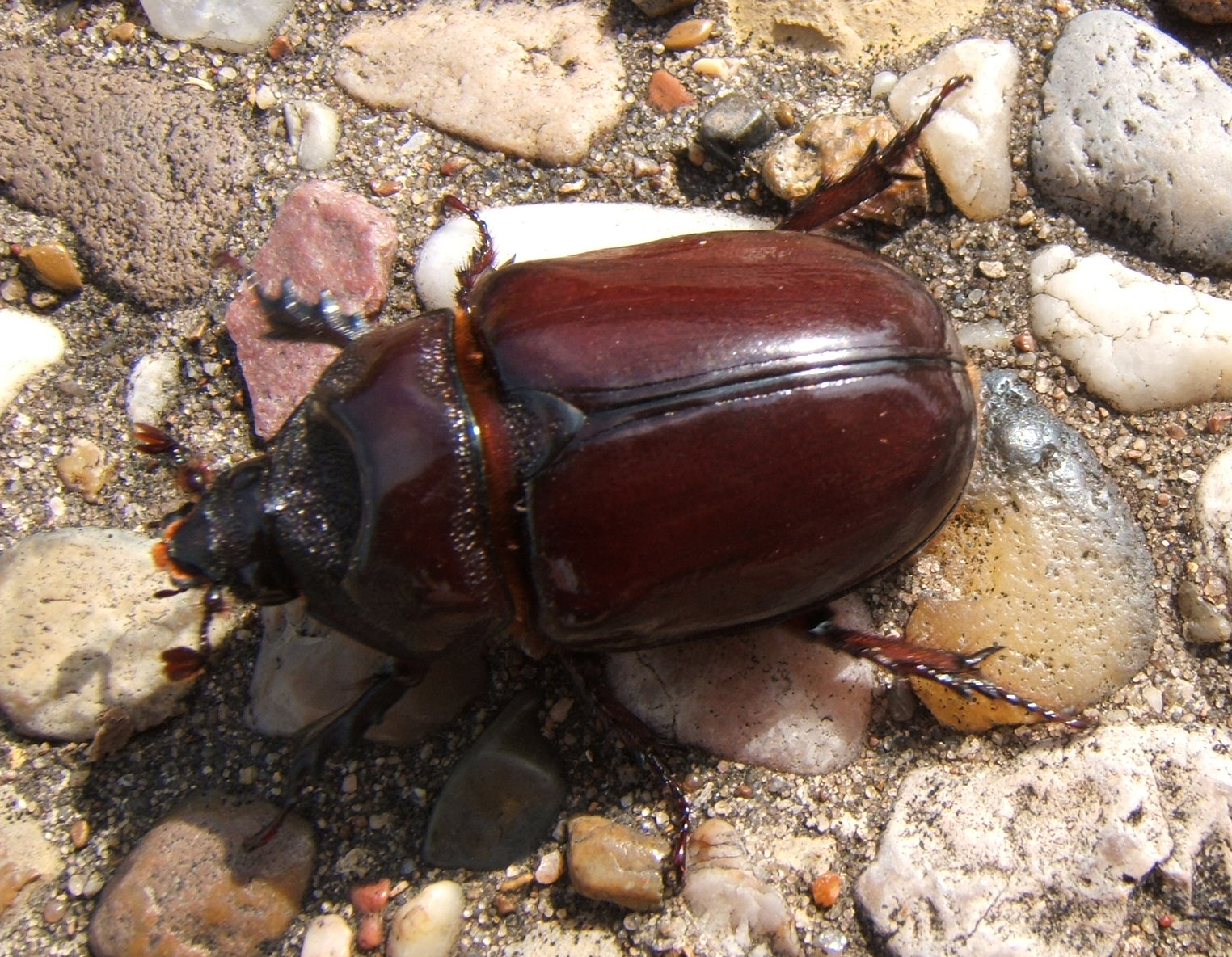
Adult female
