= Oryctoantiquus =

Oryctoantiquus Temporal range: Eocene

Scientific classification
- Kingdom: Animalia
- Phylum: Arthropoda
- Clade: Pancrustacea
- Class: Insecta
- Order: Coleoptera
- Suborder: Polyphaga
- Infraorder: Scarabaeiformia
- Family: Scarabaeidae
- Subfamily: Dynastinae
- Genus: †Oryctoantiquus; Ratcliffe and Smith (2005)

Type species
- Oryctoantiquus borealis Ratcliffe and Smith (2005)

Extinct genus of beetle

Oryctoantiquus is a genus of middle Eocene beetles in the Dynastinae clade. Oryctoantiquus is known for being the oldest known genus of Dynastinae and is also known for being the largest discovered Scarabaeidae so far. The genus only has one known species, O. borealis. The species and genus was found in Oregon, United States (specifically north-central Oregon) and dates from around 44.6 million years to 46.8 million years ago in the Clarno formation, middle Eocene epoch.

== Description ==
Based on their single known fossil, O. borealis is estimated to reach 50 mm in length, 5 millimeters longer than the previous largest known Scarabaeidae fossil, Cheirotonus otai.

== Habitat and distribution ==
The only known fossil of O. borealis was found west of the town Mitchell, Oregon. Fossils of flora gathered in the same area indicated that they would have lived in a tropical, forested climate at the time that they thrived. However, during the time they were extant the climate of their habitat changed drastically from tropical to a cooler, temperate climate; this event is known as the Eocene-Oligocene extinction event. This led to O. borealis going extinct, as they were unable to thrive in the new temperate environment.

== Etymology ==
The genus name is derived from the Greek word oryktes, meaning "digger", and the Latin word antiquuis, meaning "old". Thus meaning "old digger", referencing both the Dynastinae family's digging adaptations and the 45 million year old age of the fossil. The species name is derived from the Latin word borealis, meaning "northern" or "north", referencing that O. borealis has a northern locality (in contrast to the mainly southern distribution of other beetles in the tribe of oryctine).
