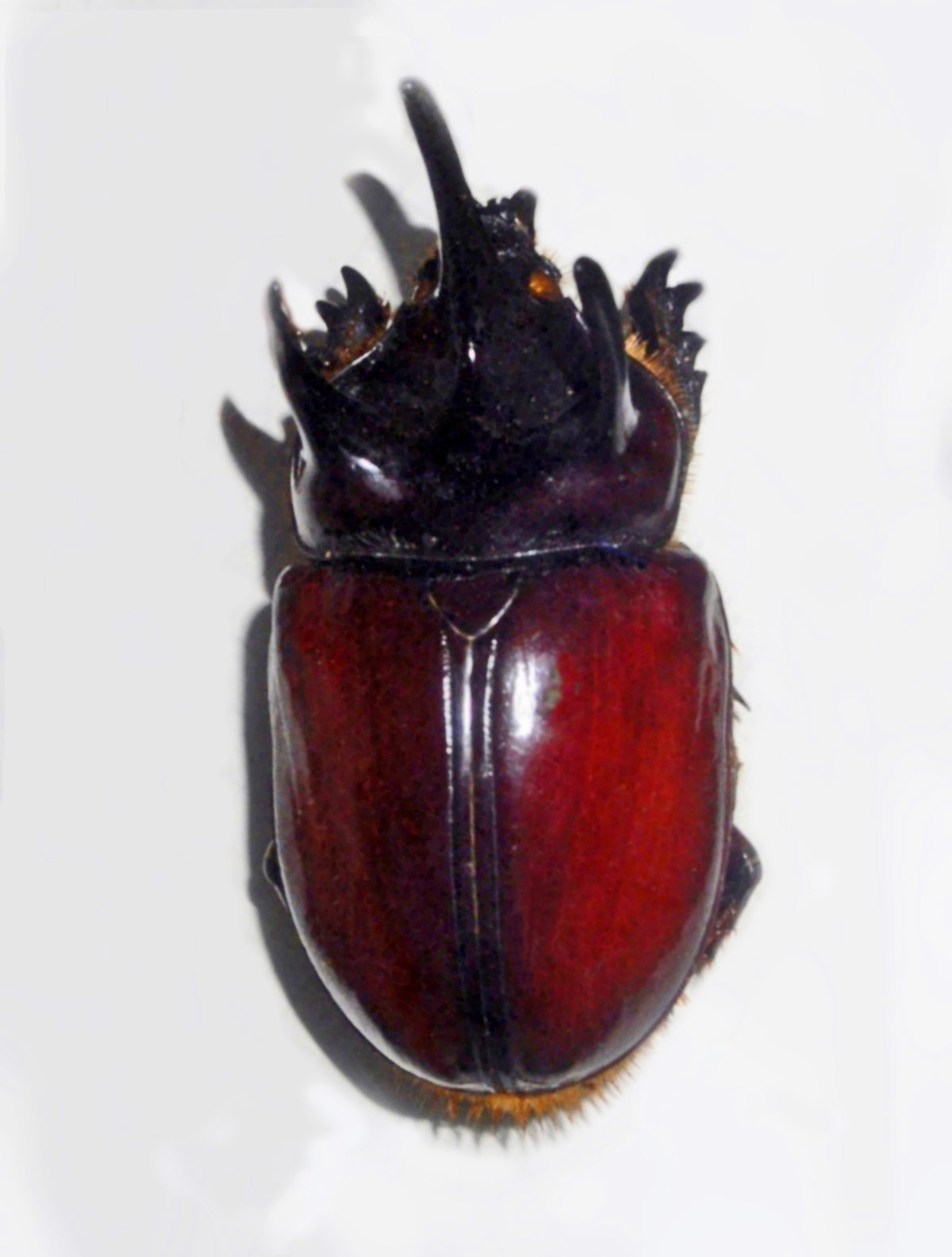
- Strategus species. Male

Scientific classification
- Domain: Eukaryota
- Kingdom: Animalia
- Phylum: Arthropoda
- Class: Insecta
- Order: Coleoptera
- Suborder: Polyphaga
- Infraorder: Scarabaeiformia
- Family: Scarabaeidae
- Subfamily: Dynastinae
- Tribe: Oryctini
- Genus: Strategus; Kirby, 1828

= Strategus (beetle) =

Genus of beetles

Strategus is a genus of rhinoceros beetles belonging to the family Scarabaeidae. The genus is widespread in America from Kansas to South America.

== Description ==
Species within this genus can reach a length of 30–45 millimetres (1.2–1.8 in). These large beetles have a more or less cylindrical body. They have a striking sexual dimorphism. Males are generally markedly larger than the females and have a long horn on the head and also two forward-looking horns on pronotum.

== Species ==
Species within this genus include:

- Strategus adolescens
- Strategus aenobarbus
- Strategus ajax
- Strategus aloeus
- Strategus anachoreta
- Strategus antaeus
- Strategus argentinus
- Strategus atlanticus
- Strategus caymani
- Strategus centaurus
- Strategus cessatus
- Strategus cessus
- Strategus craigi
- Strategus fallaciosus
- Strategus fascinus
- Strategus hipposiderus
- Strategus howdeni
- Strategus inermis
- Strategus jugurtha
- Strategus longichomperus
- Strategus mandibularis
- Strategus moralesdelgadorum
- Strategus mormon
- Strategus oblongus
- Strategus sarpedon
- Strategus simson
- Strategus splendens
- Strategus surinamensis
- Strategus symphenax
- Strategus syphax
- Strategus talpa
- Strategus tarquinius
- Strategus temoltzin
- Strategus validus
- Strategus verrilli
