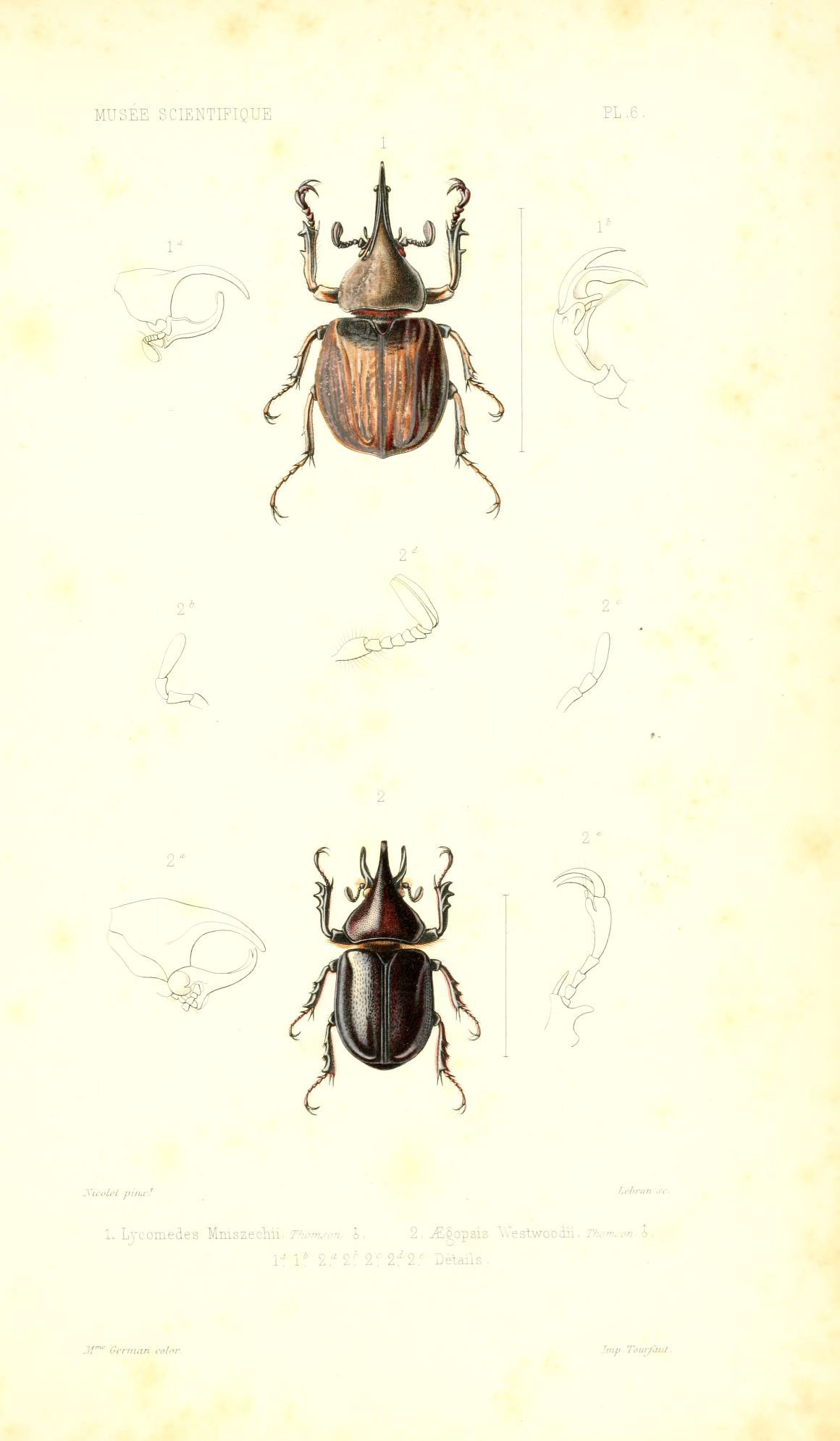
- Spodistes mniszechi

Scientific classification
- Kingdom: Animalia
- Phylum: Arthropoda
- Clade: Pancrustacea
- Class: Insecta
- Order: Coleoptera
- Suborder: Polyphaga
- Infraorder: Scarabaeiformia
- Family: Dynastidae
- Genus: Spodistes (Thomson, 1860)

= Spodistes =

Genus of insect

Spodistes is a genus of beetles. It has eight species.

== Distribution and habitat ==
Species of the genus Spodistes are found in Central America, particularly Costa Rica (most commonly found), Panama and Honduras. The species S. beltianus lives in Costa Rica where nine specimens have been found. The species S. batesi lives in Costa Rica and Panama where five have been found in Costa Rica and four have been found in Panama.

== Taxonomy ==
The genus has eight species recognised:

- Spodistes batesi
- Spodistes grandis
- Spodistes hopei
- Spodistes angulicollis
- Spodistes mniszechi
- Spodistes monzoni
- Spodistes armstrongi
- Spodistes beltianus.
