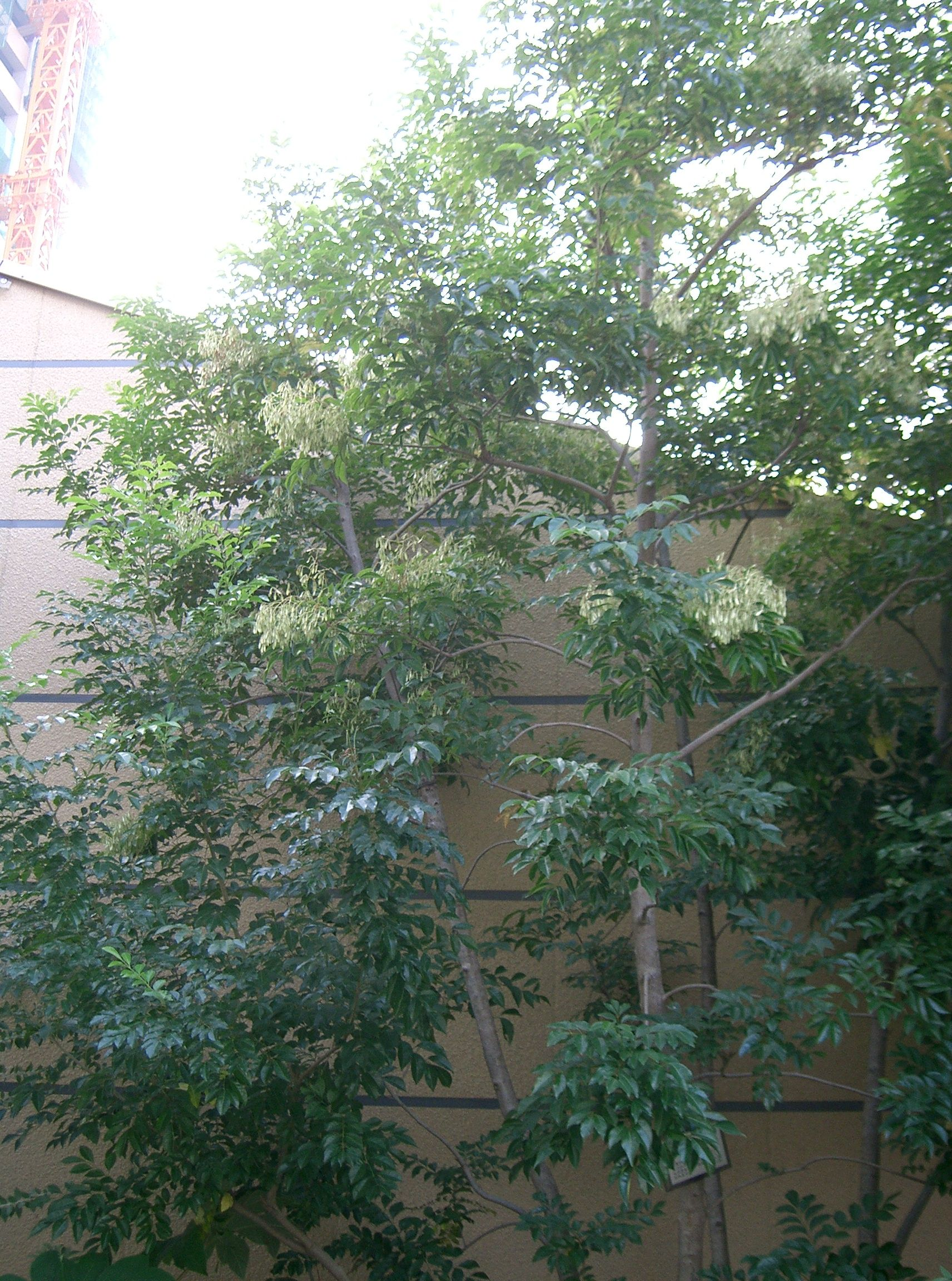

Conservation status
- Least Concern (IUCN 3.1)

Scientific classification
- Kingdom: Plantae
- Clade: Tracheophytes
- Clade: Angiosperms
- Clade: Eudicots
- Clade: Asterids
- Order: Lamiales
- Family: Oleaceae
- Genus: Fraxinus
- Section: Fraxinus sect. Ornus
- Species: F. griffithii

Binomial name
- Fraxinus griffithii C.B.Clarke

= Fraxinus griffithii =

Species of ash

Fraxinus griffithii, the Himalayan ash or evergreen ash is a species of flowering tree. It has been recorded in the Philippines, Indonesia, Vietnam, Myanmar, Taiwan, China, Bangladesh and India. This plant is commonly grown as an ornamental in Australia, where it is an invasive species.
