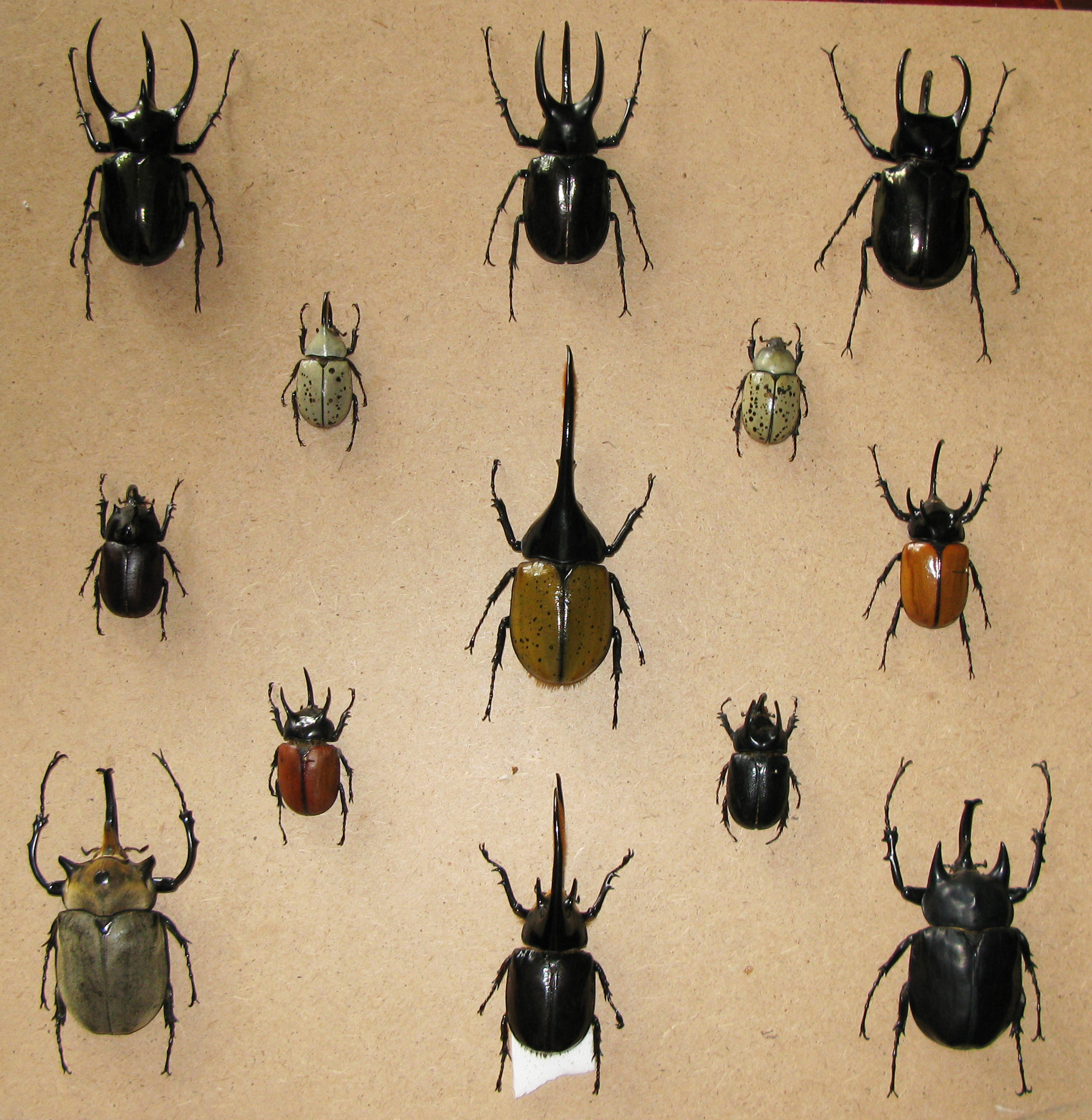

Scientific classification
- Kingdom: Animalia
- Phylum: Arthropoda
- Clade: Pancrustacea
- Class: Insecta
- Order: Coleoptera
- Suborder: Polyphaga
- Infraorder: Scarabaeiformia
- Family: Scarabaeidae
- Subfamily: Dynastinae; MacLeay, 1819

Tribes
- See text

= Dynastinae =

Dynastinae Temporal range: Eocene–Recent

Subfamily of beetles

Dynastinae or rhinoceros beetles are a subfamily of the scarab beetle family (Scarabaeidae), named for their rhinoceros-like horns. Other common names – some for particular groups of rhinoceros beetles – include Hercules beetles, unicorn beetles or horn beetles. Over 1,500 species and 225 genera of rhinoceros beetles are known.

Many rhinoceros beetles are well known for their unique shapes and large sizes. Some famous species are, for example, the Atlas beetle (Chalcosoma atlas), common rhinoceros beetle (Xylotrupes ulysses), elephant beetle (Megasoma elephas), European rhinoceros beetle (Oryctes nasicornis), Hercules beetle (Dynastes hercules), Japanese rhinoceros beetle or kabutomushi (Allomyrina dichotoma), ox beetle (Strategus aloeus) and the Eastern Hercules beetle (Dynastes tityus).

== Description ==
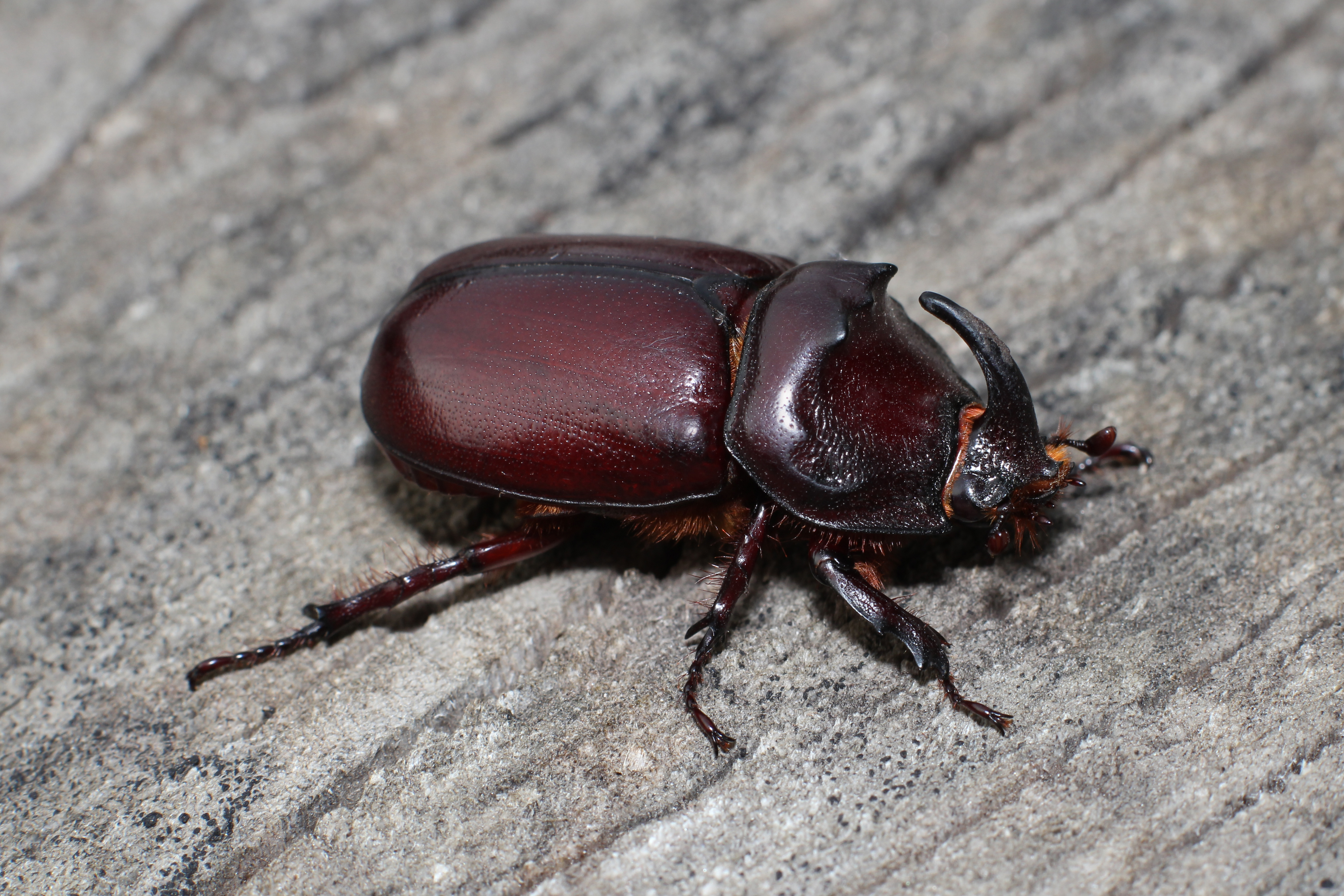
European rhinoceros beetle

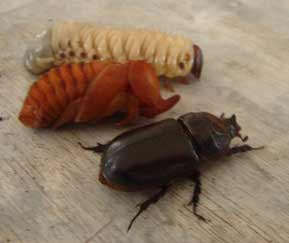
European rhinoceros beetle – three stages from larva to adult: larva (back), pupa (center), and imago (front)

The Dynastinae are among the largest of beetles, reaching more than 15 centimetres (6 inches) in length, but are completely harmless to humans because they cannot bite or sting. Some species have been anecdotally claimed to lift up to 850 times their own weight. An extinct Eocene Oryctoantiquus borealis was the largest fossil scarabeid, with a length of 5 centimetres (2.0 in). Some modern Oryctini grew up to 7 cm (3 in). Common names of the Dynastinae refer to the characteristic horns borne only by the males of most species in the group. Each has a horn on the head and another horn pointing forward from the center of the thorax. The horns are used in fighting other males during mating season, and for digging. The size of the horn is a good indicator of nutrition and physical health.

The body of an adult rhinoceros beetle is covered by a thick exoskeleton. A pair of thick wings lie atop another set of membranous wings underneath, allowing the rhinoceros beetle to fly, although not very efficiently owing to its large size. Their best protection from predators is their size and stature, also avoiding many due to being (not strictly) nocturnal. When the sun is out, they hide under logs or in vegetation to camouflage themselves from the few predators big enough to eat them. If rhinoceros beetles are disturbed, some can release very loud, hissing squeaks created by rubbing their abdomens against the ends of their wing covers.

=== Activity patterns and host-plant plasticity ===
While rhinoceros beetles are widely characterized as nocturnal or crepuscular, recent ecological research by Ryo Shibata and Wataru Kojima demonstrates that their activity patterns are highly plastic and depend heavily on food availability and host tree species. For example, studies on the Japanese rhinoceros beetle (Trypoxylus dichotomus) reveal that their circadian behaviors shift dramatically between different host plants. When aggregating on oak trees (Quercus acutissima), the beetles exhibit typical nocturnal behavior, arriving after sunset and returning to underground refuges before sunrise to avoid daytime predators.

Conversely, when utilizing ash trees (Fraxinus griffithii), the beetles display significant diurnal (daytime) activity, remaining active and feeding throughout the day. Because ash trees require the beetles to actively shave away bark to access sap—a highly time-consuming process—the energy and time investment forces a shift away from strict nocturnality. This behavioral flexibility proves that environmental factors and foraging constraints can override their typical nocturnal rhythms.

== Ecology ==
These beetles' larval stages can be several years long. The larvae feed on rotten wood and the adults feed on nectar, plant sap, and fruit. First, the larvae hatch from eggs and later develop into pupae before they reach adulthood.

=== Mating ===
Male Japanese rhinoceros beetles (Allomyrina dichotoma) fight to dominate sap sites. Males use their horns to pry rival males off the area, which also may give them the chance to mate with a female. In this and other species that defend mating sites, larger males with larger horns mate more frequently, as they win more contests. Small males often avoid larger males and exhibit alternative strategies to gain access to females.

== As pests ==
Some species, such as the coconut rhinoceros beetle (Oryctes rhinoceros), can become major pests, e.g., in tree plantations. Usually though, beetle population densities are not as high as in some other pest insects, and they typically prefer food trees which are already sick or dying from some other cause. Some species' larvae, however, will attack healthy trees or even root vegetables, and when they occur in large numbers, can cause economically significant damage. The fungus Metarhizium majus is a proven biocontrol agent for beetle infestation in crops.

== Uses ==
Rhinoceros beetles have become popular pets in parts of Asia, due to being relatively clean, easy to maintain, and safe to handle. Also in Asia, male beetles are used for gambling fights. Since males naturally have the tendency to fight each other for the attention of females, they are the ones used for battle. To get the two male beetles to lock in combat, a female beetle is used, or a small noisemaker duplicating the female's mating call.

There is an illegal trade in rhino beetles which forms part of a broader insect trafficking network catering to exotic pet enthusiasts and trophy collectors willing to pay for rare and culturally popular specimens. Despite the significant ecological pressures this trade exerts on insect populations such as rhino beetles, insect trafficking remains largely unregulated and overlooked compared to the attention given to charismatic wildlife like elephants or rhinos.

Entomologist Séverin Tchibozo suggests the larvae contain much more protein (40%) than chicken (20%) and beef (approximately 18%), and they could become a protein source for a large human population.

Dr. MinJun Kim, leading a team of engineers in National Science Foundation-funded research, examined the function and aerodynamics of Allomyrina dichotoma with the help of researchers in Drexel University's Mechanical Engineering Department and in collaboration with Konkuk University in South Korea.

== Tribes with selected genera and species ==
=== Agaocephalini ===
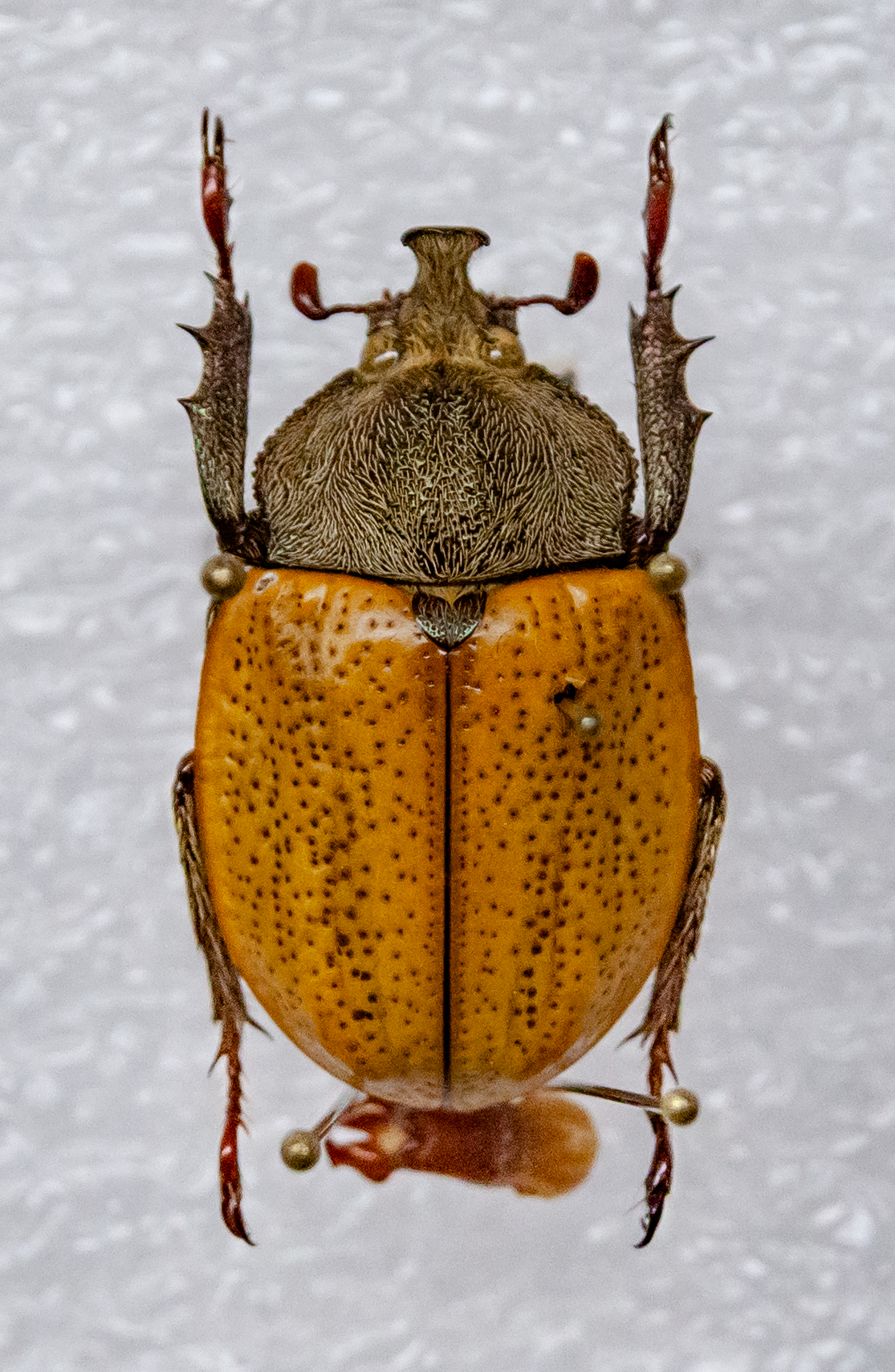
Antodon goryi

Auth: Burmeister, 1847. all genera:

1. Aegopsis Burmeister, 1847
2. Agaocephala Lepeletier & Audinet-Serville, 1828
3. Antodon Brême, 1845
4. Brachysiderus Waterhouse, 1881
5. Colacus Ohaus, 1910
6. Democrates (beetle) Burmeister, 1847
7. Gnathogolofa Arrow, 1914
8. Horridocalia Endrödi, 1974
9. Lycomedes (beetle) Breme, 1844
10. Mitracephala Thomson, 1859
11. Spodistes Burmeister, 1847

=== Cyclocephalini ===
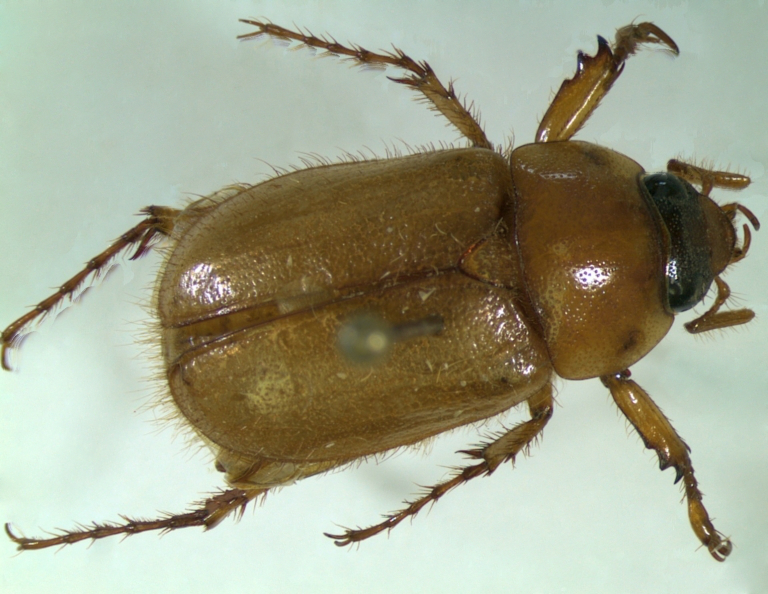
Cyclocephala borealis (Cyclocephalini)

Auth: Laporte, 1840. Selected genera:

- Ancognatha Erichson, 1847
- Cyclocephala Dejean, 1821 (masked chafers)
- Dyscinetus Harold, 1869 (rice beetles)

=== Dynastini ===
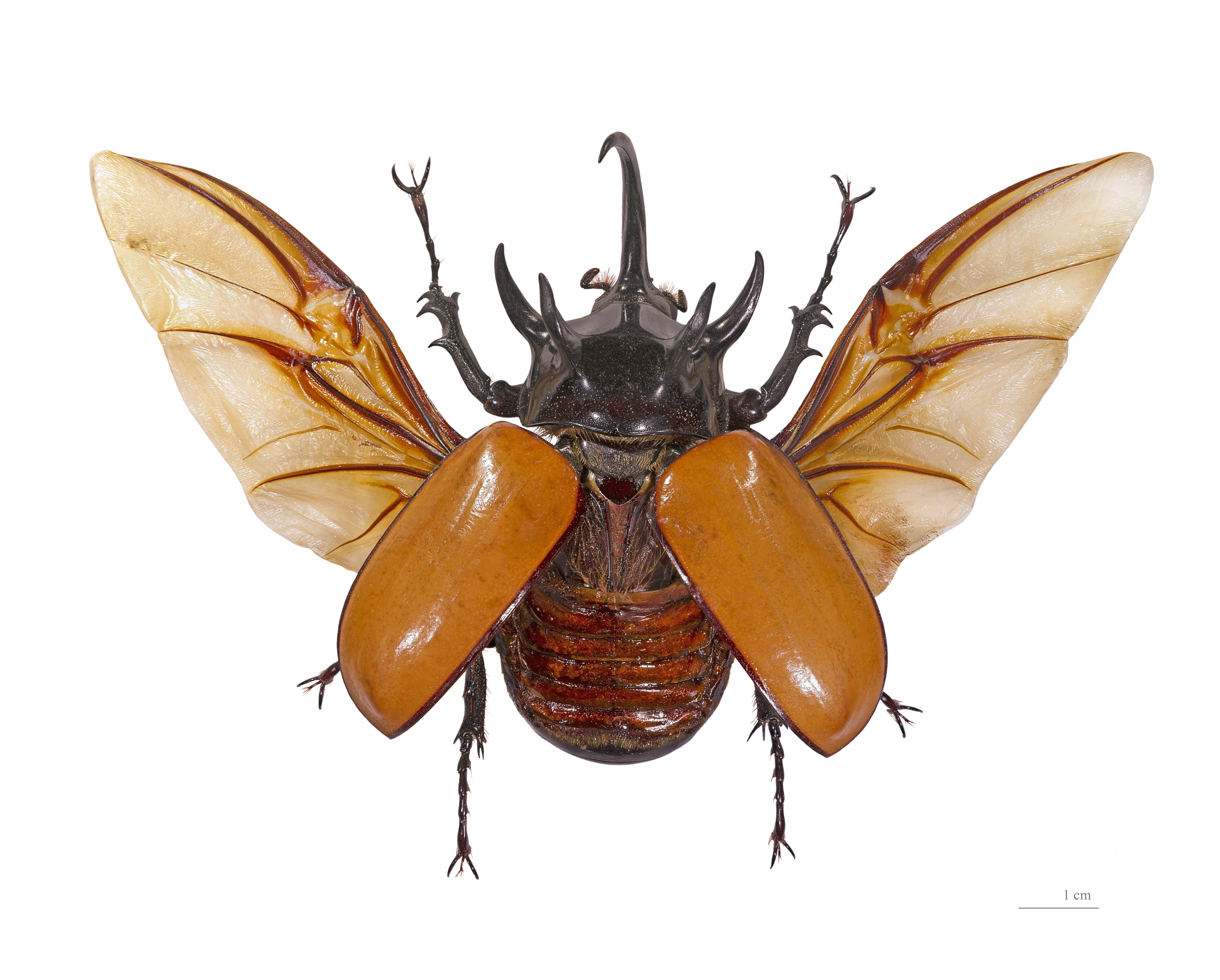
Eupatorus gracilicornis (Dynastini)

Auth: MacLeay, 1819. Selected genera:

- Allomyrina Arrow, 1911 (including Trypoxylus)
  - Allomyrina dichotoma – Japanese rhinoceros beetle
- Chalcosoma Hope, 1837
  - Chalcosoma atlas – Atlas beetle
  - Chalcosoma moellenkampi – Moellenkampi beetle
  - Chalcosoma caucasus – Caucasus beetle
- Dynastes MacLeay, 1819
  - Dynastes hercules – Hercules beetle
  - Dynastes neptunus – Neptune beetle
- Eupatorus Burmeister, 1847
  - Eupatorus gracilicornis – Five-horned rhinoceros beetle
  - Eupatorus siamensis – Siamese beetle
  - Eupatorus birmanicus – Rabbit beetle
- Megasoma Kirby, 1825
  - Megasoma mars - Mars beetle
  - Megasoma elephas - Elephant beetle
  - Megasoma actaeon - Actaeon beetle
- Xylotrupes Hope, 1837
  - Xylotrupes gideon – Siamese rhinoceros beetle
  - Xylotrupes ulysses

=== Hexodontini ===
Auth. Lacordaire, 1856; all genera from Madagascar:

1. Hemicyrthus Reiche, 1860
2. Hexodon Olivier, 1789
3. Hyboschema Péringuey, 1901

=== Oryctini ===
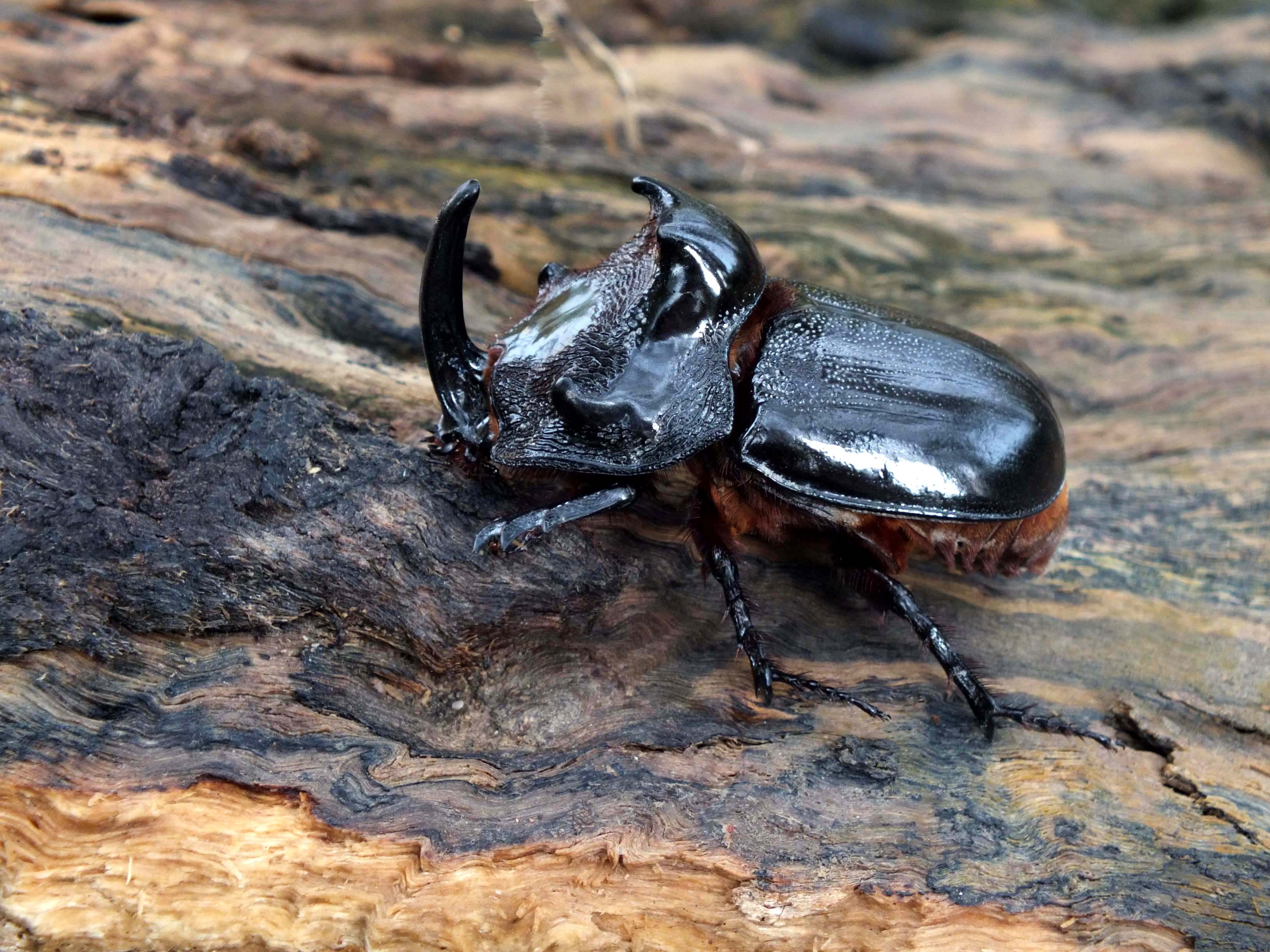
Trichogomphus mongol (Oryctini)

Auth: Mulsant, 1842. Selected genera:

- Enema Hope, 1837
- Megaceras Hope, 1837
  - Megaceras briansaltini
- Oryctes Hellwig, 1798
  - Oryctes nasicornis – European rhinoceros beetle
  - Oryctes rhinoceros – coconut rhinoceros beetle
- Strategus Kirby, 1828
  - Strategus aloeus – ox beetle
- Trichogomphus Burmeister, 1847
- Xyloryctes

=== Oryctoderini ===
Auth. Endrödi, 1966; all genera:

1. Chalcasthenes Arrow, 1937
2. Chalcocrates Heller, 1903
3. Coenoryctoderus Prell, 1933
4. Hatamus Sharp, 1877
5. Melanhyphus Fairmaire, 1881
6. Neohyphus Heller, 1896
7. Onychionyx Arrow, 1914
8. Oryctoderinus Endrödi, 1978
9. Oryctoderus Boisduval, 1835
10. Paroryctoderus Dechambre, 1994

=== Pentodontini ===
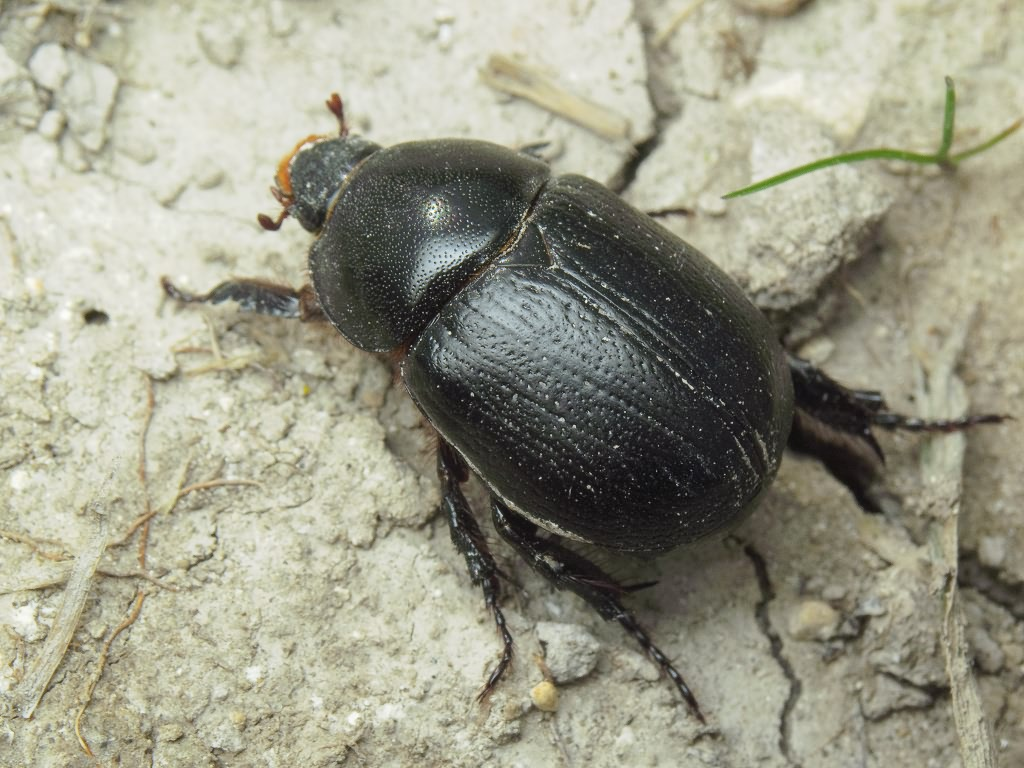
Pentodon idiota (Pentodontini)

Auth: Mulsant, 1842. Selected genera:

- Diloboderus Sturm, 1826 monotypic Diloboderus abderus
- Ligyrus Burmeister, 1847
- Pentodon Hope, 1837
- Pericoptus Burmeister, 1847
- Tomarus Erichson, 1847

=== Phileurini ===
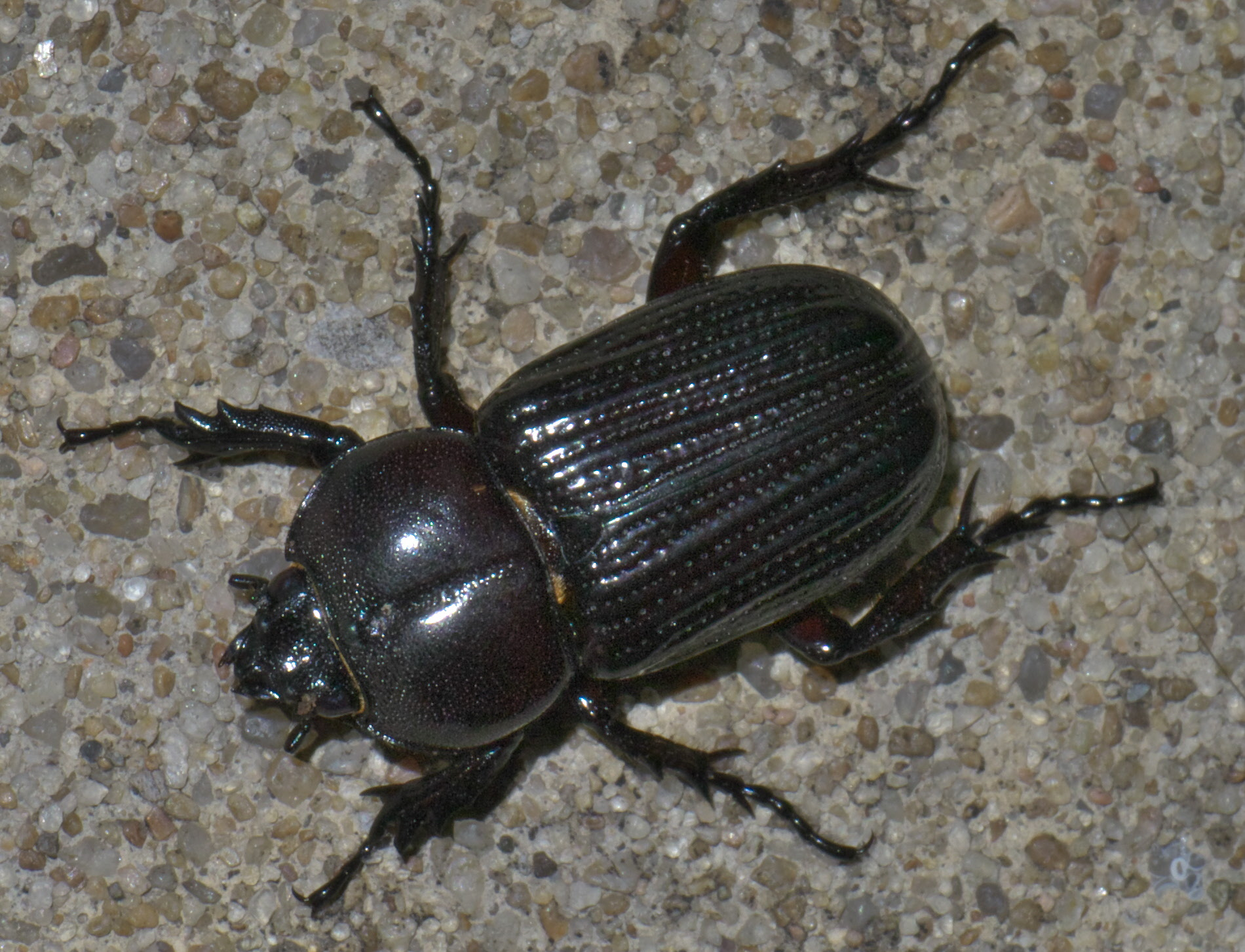
Phileurus valgus (Phileurini)

Auth: Burmeister, 1847; selected genera:

- Cryptodus MacLeay, 1819
- Phileurus Latreille, 1807
