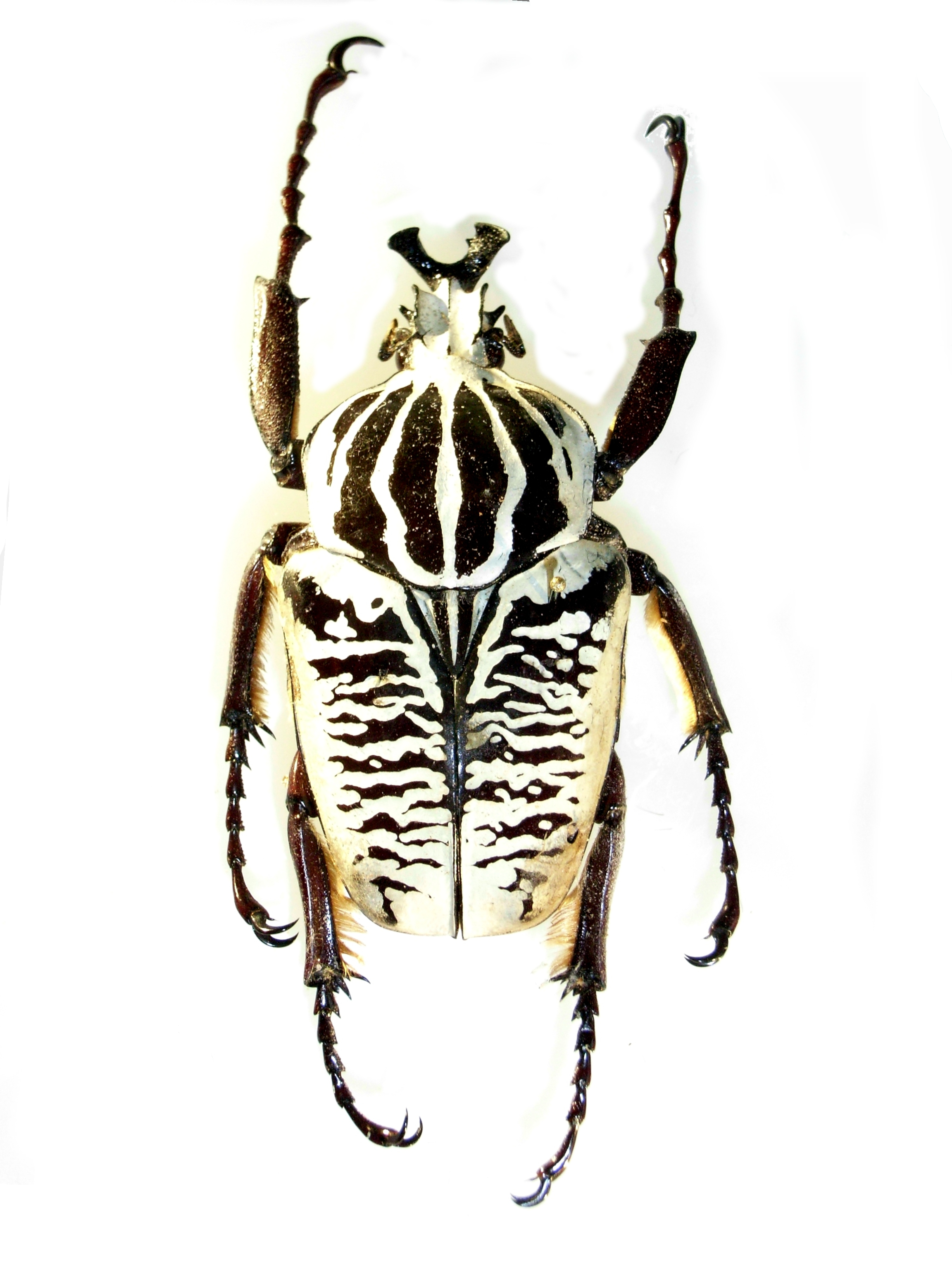
- Goliathus albosignatus kirkianus

Scientific classification
- Kingdom: Animalia
- Phylum: Arthropoda
- Clade: Pancrustacea
- Class: Insecta
- Order: Coleoptera
- Suborder: Polyphaga
- Infraorder: Scarabaeiformia
- Family: Scarabaeidae
- Genus: Goliathus
- Species: G. albosignatus

Binomial name
- Goliathus albosignatus Boheman, 1857

Synonyms
- List: (list includes kirkianus synonyms); Goliathus albopictus Westwood, 1874; Goliathus kirkii Thomson, 1881 (missp.); Goliathus kirkianus conradsi Preiss, 1933; Goliathus kirkianus steinwehri Preiss, 1933; Goliathus albosignatus bohemani Endrödi, 1960; Goliathus albosignatus burmeisteri Endrödi, 1960; Goliathus albosignatus druryi Endrödi, 1960 (Preocc.); Goliathus albosignatus fabriciusi Endrödi, 1960; Goliathus albosignatus herbsti Endrödi, 1960; Goliathus albosignatus klugi Endrödi, 1960; Goliathus albosignatus kolbei Endrödi, 1960 (Preocc.); Goliathus albosignatus lacordairei Endrödi, 1960; Goliathus albosignatus lamarcki Endrödi, 1960; Goliathus albosignatus linnei Endrödi, 1960; Goliathus albosignatus macleayi Endrödi, 1960; Goliathus albosignatus nickerli Endrödi, 1960; Goliathus albosignatus olivieri Endrödi, 1960; Goliathus albosignatus thomsoni Endrödi, 1960; Goliathus albosignatus voeti Endrödi, 1960; Goliathus albosignatus westwoodi Endrödi, 1960}

= Goliathus albosignatus =

Species of beetle

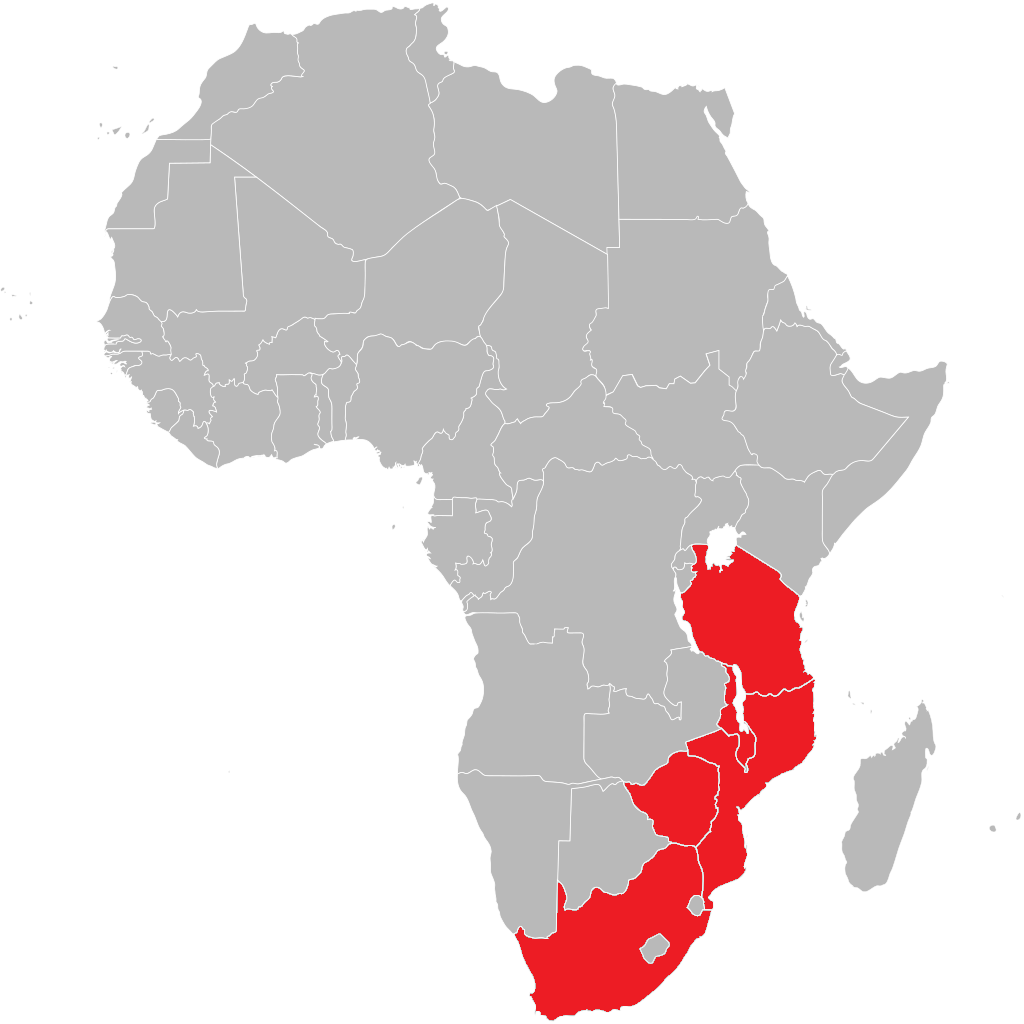
Goliathus albosignatus distribution in Africa

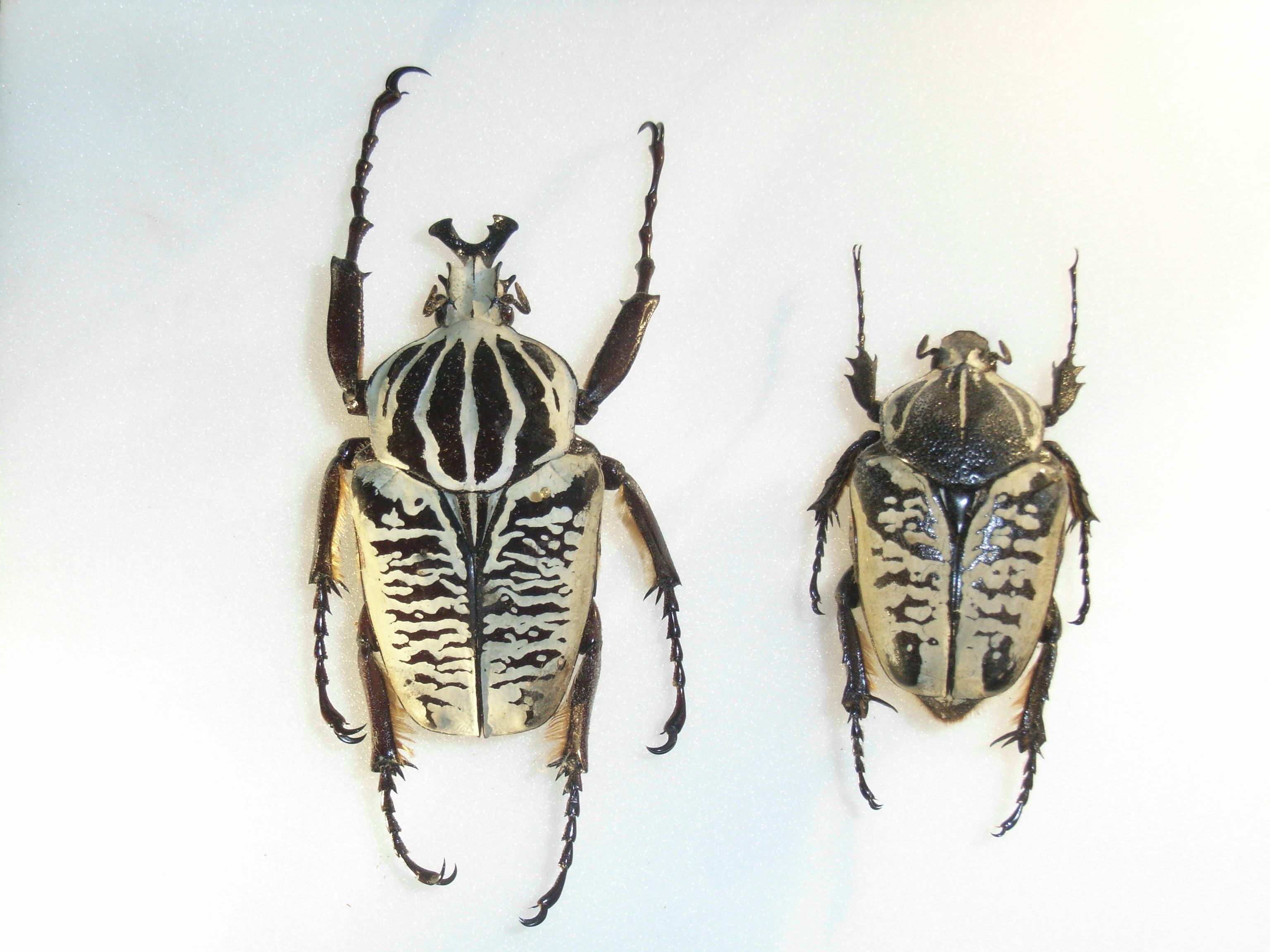
Goliathus albosignatus albosignatus

Goliathus albosignatus is a species of beetle of the family Scarabaeidae, described by Carl Henrik Boheman in 1857. It is one of several species of Goliath beetles that inhabit Africa, but it is the only one exclusively found in subtropical sections of the continent.

== Description ==
Goliathus albosignatus can reach a length of about 45–70 mm (1.8–2.8 in) in males, and about 40–50 mm (1.6–2.0 in) in females. There are distinctive non-uniform bands of black that stretch horizontally across their elytra to differentiate it from other species. While Goliath beetles are among the largest beetles on Earth, this is the smallest of the species in this genus and not as commonly found as the others. Sexually dimorphic traits are also present in Goliath beetles and include males having a Y-shaped horn protruding from their head to assist with confrontation between males, while in females the horn is absent and their wedge-shaped head is fit for digging the burrows where eggs are to be laid.

== Biology ==
Development of Goliathus albosignatus is carried out in hyrax dung, a trait shared with Fornasinius species, but which does not occur among any other Goliath beetles. Their diet consists of high protein as larvae, but after pupating into adulthood, they have been known to feed on sap from Acacia. Other behaviour of note is that they will gather specifically on marula trees.

== Taxonomy ==
Goliathus albosignatus is taxonomically separated from the other species in Goliathus according to barcoding analysis results that were published in Entomologia Africana in January 2020. Characteristics differentiating Goliathus albosignatus that are mentioned include "hammer-shaped post-clypeal horns of the male, the elongated tarsi, and the presence of cretaceous marks on the pygidium".

The tree resulting from the analysis is listed below:

- Goliathus
  - - - Goliathus g. goliatus
      - Goliathus goliatus meleagris
    - - Goliathus orientialis usambarensis
      - Goliathus regius
  - Goliathus albosignatus

== Subspecies ==
There are 2 subspecies:

- Goliathus albosignatus albosignatus Boheman 1857
- Goliathus albosignatus kirkianus Gray, 1864

== Subspecies distributions and sizes ==
- Goliathus albosignatus albosignatus:

Distribution: Middle to South Zimbabwe and North-Eastern South Africa; Size: ♂ 40 – 68 mm; ♀ 45 – 52 mm.

- Goliathus albosignatus kirkianus:

Distribution: Malawi, Mozambique and Tanzania; Size: ♂ 40 – 71 mm; ♀ 45 – 55 mm.
