= Tomarus =

Scientific classification
- Kingdom: Animalia
- Phylum: Arthropoda
- Clade: Pancrustacea
- Class: Insecta
- Order: Coleoptera
- Suborder: Polyphaga
- Infraorder: Scarabaeiformia
- Family: Scarabaeidae
- Tribe: Pentodontini
- Genus: Tomarus; Erichson, 1847

Species
- see text

Synonyms
- Anagrylius Casey, 1915; Ligyrellus Casey, 1915

Genus of beetles

Tomarus is a genus of scarab beetles in the subfamily Dynastinae, the rhinoceros beetles. They are native to the Americas, where they are distributed from the central United States to Argentina, and a few species occur in the Caribbean.

The adult beetles are nocturnal and attracted to lights; the larvae generally remain in the soil, often feeding on plant roots.

In order to identify species, the parameres of the male must be pulled out of the abdomen and examined. This process should be done carefully, because the parameres are quite fragile, "almost parchment-like".

== Species ==
The following species belong to the genus Tomarus:

- Tomarus adoceteus Ratcliffe & Cave, 2010^{c g}
- Tomarus bidentulus (Fairmaire, 1892)^{c}
- Tomarus bituberculatus (Palisot De Beauvois, 1805)^{c g}
- Tomarus burmeisteri (Steinheil, 1872)^{c g}
- Tomarus cicatricosus (Prell, 1937)^{c g}
- Tomarus colombianus Lopez-Garcia & Gasca-Alvarez, 2014^{g}
- Tomarus columbianus López-García & Gasca-Álvarez, 2014^{c g}
- Tomarus compositus (Wickham, 1911)^{c g}
- Tomarus cuniculus (Fabricius, 1801)^{i c g b}
- Tomarus discrepans Escalona & Joly, 2006^{c g}
- Tomarus ebenus (Degeer, 1774)^{c g} = type species
- Tomarus effetus (Wickham, 1914)^{c g}
- Tomarus formosianus Grouvelle, 1913^{g}
- Tomarus fossor (Latreille, 1833)^{c g}
- Tomarus gyas Erichson, 1848^{c g}
- Tomarus laevicollis (Bates, 1888)^{i c g}
- Tomarus maimon Erichson, 1847^{c g}
- Tomarus maternus (Prell, 1937)^{c g}
- Tomarus nasutus (Burmeister, 1847)^{i c g}
- Tomarus neglectus (LeConte, 1847)^{i c g b}
- Tomarus peruvianus (Endrödi, 1970)^{c}
- Tomarus pullus (Prell, 1937)^{c g}
- Tomarus pumilus (Prell, 1937)^{c g}
- Tomarus roigjunenti Neita & Ratcliffe, 2017^{c g}
- Tomarus rosettae (Endrödi, 1968)^{c g}
- Tomarus rostratus Dupuis, 2014^{c g}
- Tomarus rubripes (Boheman, 1858)^{c g}
- Tomarus sallaei (Bates, 1888)^{i c g b}
- Tomarus selanderi (Cartwright, 1959)^{i c g}
- Tomarus similis (Endrödi, 1968)^{c g}
- Tomarus spinipenis Neita & Ratcliffe, 2017^{c g}
- Tomarus subtropicus (Blatchley, 1922)^{i c g b} (sugarcane grub)
- Tomarus villosus (Burmeister, 1847)^{c g}

Data sources: i = ITIS, c = Catalogue of Life, g = GBIF, b = Bugguide.net

Note - now placed in the restored genus Ligyrus

- Tomarus gibbosus (LeConte, 1856), the carrot beetle
- Tomarus relictus (Say, 1825)
