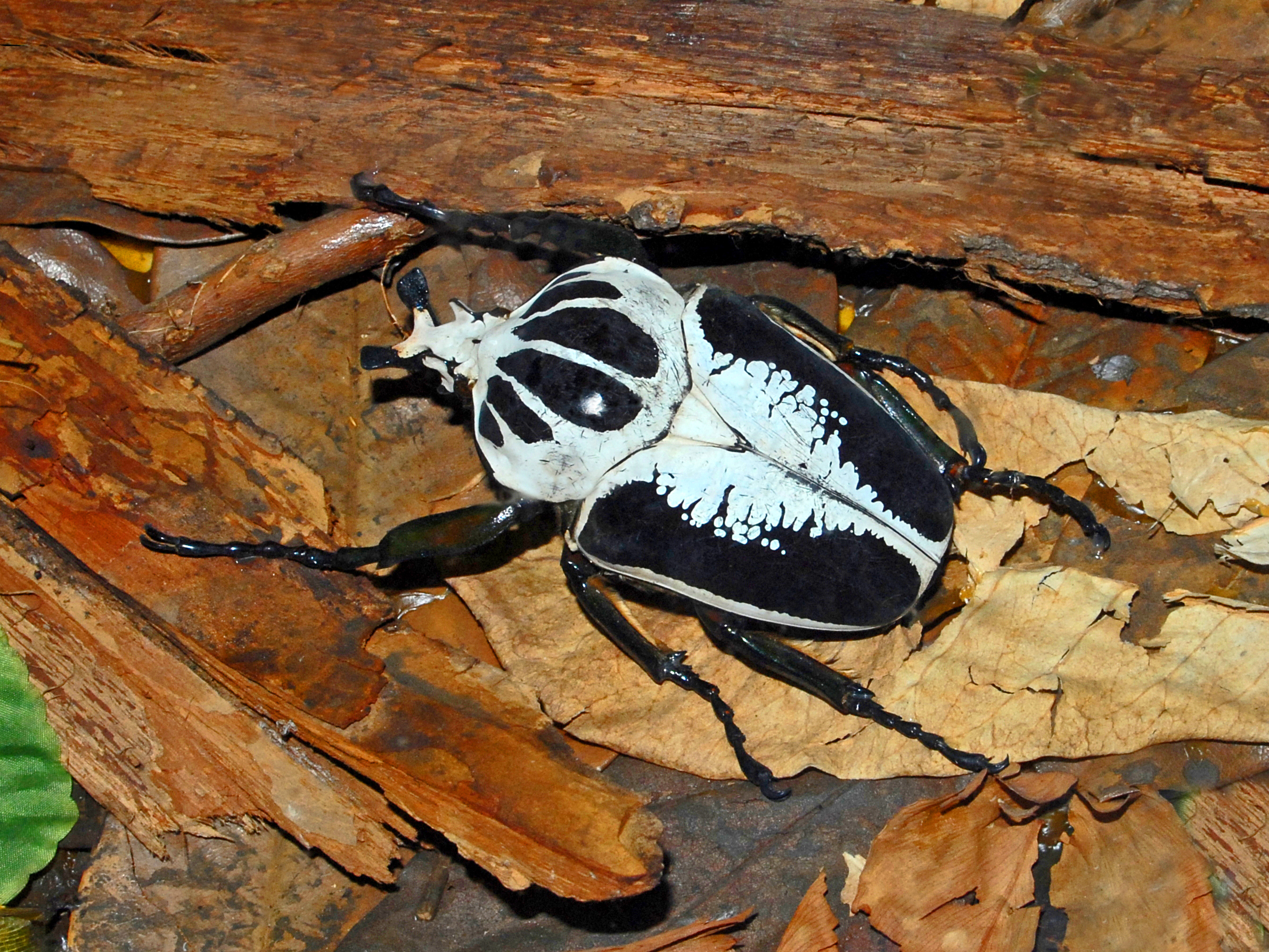
- Goliathus regius

Scientific classification
- Kingdom: Animalia
- Phylum: Arthropoda
- Clade: Pancrustacea
- Class: Insecta
- Order: Coleoptera
- Suborder: Polyphaga
- Infraorder: Scarabaeiformia
- Family: Scarabaeidae
- Genus: Goliathus
- Species: G. regius

Binomial name
- Goliathus regius Klug, 1835

Synonyms
- List: Goliathus drurii Westwood, 1837; Goliathus giganteus MacLeay, 1838; Goliathus africanus Laporte, 1840 (Preocc.); Goliathus atlas Nickerl, 1887; Goliathus basilewskyi Endrödi, 1960; Goliathus balthasari Endrödi, 1960; Goliathus arrowi Endrödi, 1960; Goliathus tesari Endrödi, 1960; Goliathus brittoni Endrödi, 1960; Goliathus ruteri Endrödi, 1960; Goliathus freyi Endrödi, 1960; Goliathus sjoestedti Endrödi, 1960; Goliathus brincki Endrödi, 1960; Goliathus moseri Endrödi, 1960; Goliathus marshalli Endrödi, 1960; Goliathus machatschkei Endrödi, 1960; Goliathus landini Endrödi, 1960; Goliathus miksici Endrödi, 1960; Goliathus janssensi Endrödi, 1960; Goliathus moellenkampi Endrödi, 1960; Goliathus burgeoni Endrödi, 1960; Goliathus pauliani Endrödi, 1960; Goliathus clementi Endrödi, 1960; Goliathus freudei Endrödi, 1960; Goliathus grebenscikovi Endrödi, 1960

= Goliathus regius =

Species of beetle

Goliathus regius, the Royal Goliath beetle, is a species of beetles of the family Scarabaeidae.

== Description ==
Goliathus regius is very similar to Goliathus goliatus in both structure and colour characters. It is one of the largest species of the genus Goliathus, with a body length of 50–115 millimetres (2.0–4.5 in) in males and of 56–82 millimetres (2.2–3.2 in) in females. The body is broad and flat. Elytra are whitish with a complex pattern of black markings, and the pronotum (thoracic shield) has a large black longitudinal stripe. The head bears a black Y-shaped horn in males, used in battles with other males. Legs are long, powerful, black. Females have two sharp spikes on the outside of the tibiae. Despite its large body, these beetles fly well. They have a large and membranous secondary pair of wings. When not in use, these wings are kept completely folded beneath the elytra. These beetles feed primarily on tree sap and fruits.

== Life cycle ==
The larvae live in the soil and need the protein-rich diet, because they grow very quickly. In captivity they may feed on commercial cat and dog food. Even under optimum conditions, the larvae take about 4 months to mature fully, which corresponds to the duration of the rainy season. Larvae can reach a length of about 130 millimetres (5.1 in) and a weight of about 100 grams (3.5 oz). When maximum size is reached, the larva constructs a pupal chamber in which it will undergo metamorphosis (pupation) to the adult state. In this stage they spend most of the dry season. The adult does not come up before the rain comes. In captivity the adults can live over a year, but in the wild life is probably much shorter.

== Distribution ==
This species is present in western equatorial Africa, in Equatorial Guinea, Sierra Leone, Ivory Coast, South Burkina Faso, Ghana, Togo, Benin (Dahome), Nigeria and Liberia.

== Gallery ==
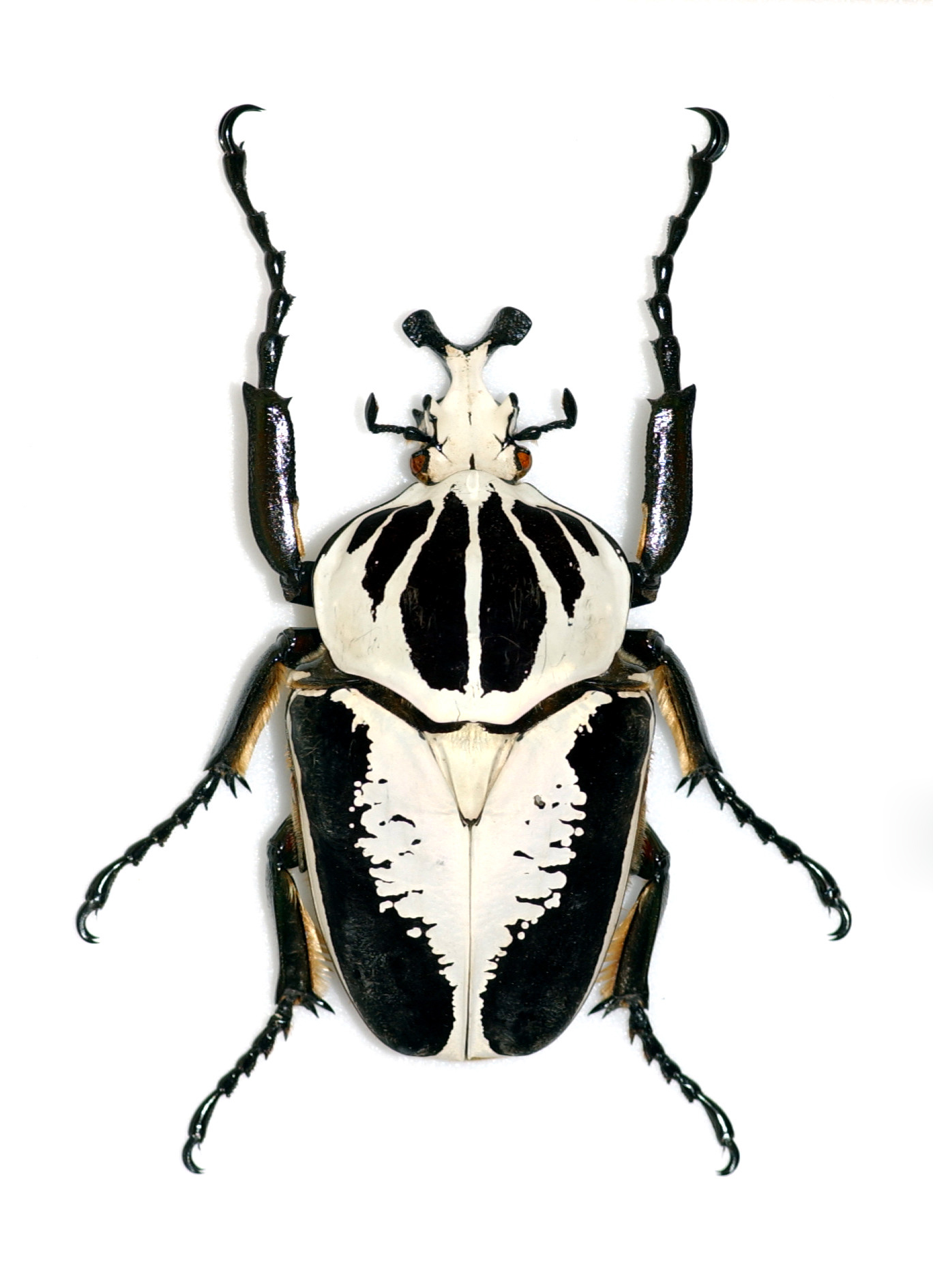
Goliathus regius, male, Musée d'Histoire Naturelle de Lille

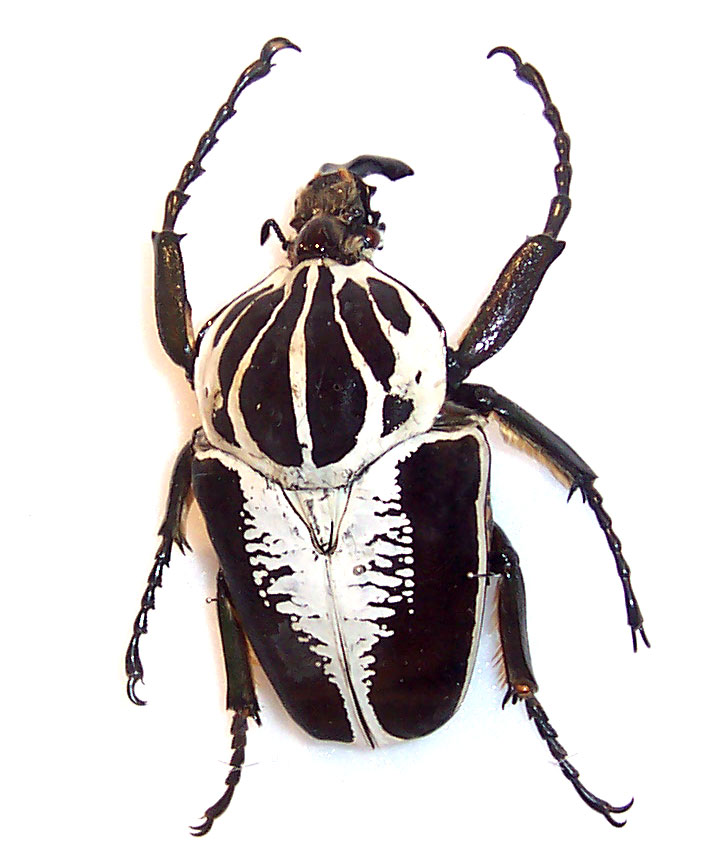
Goliathus regius

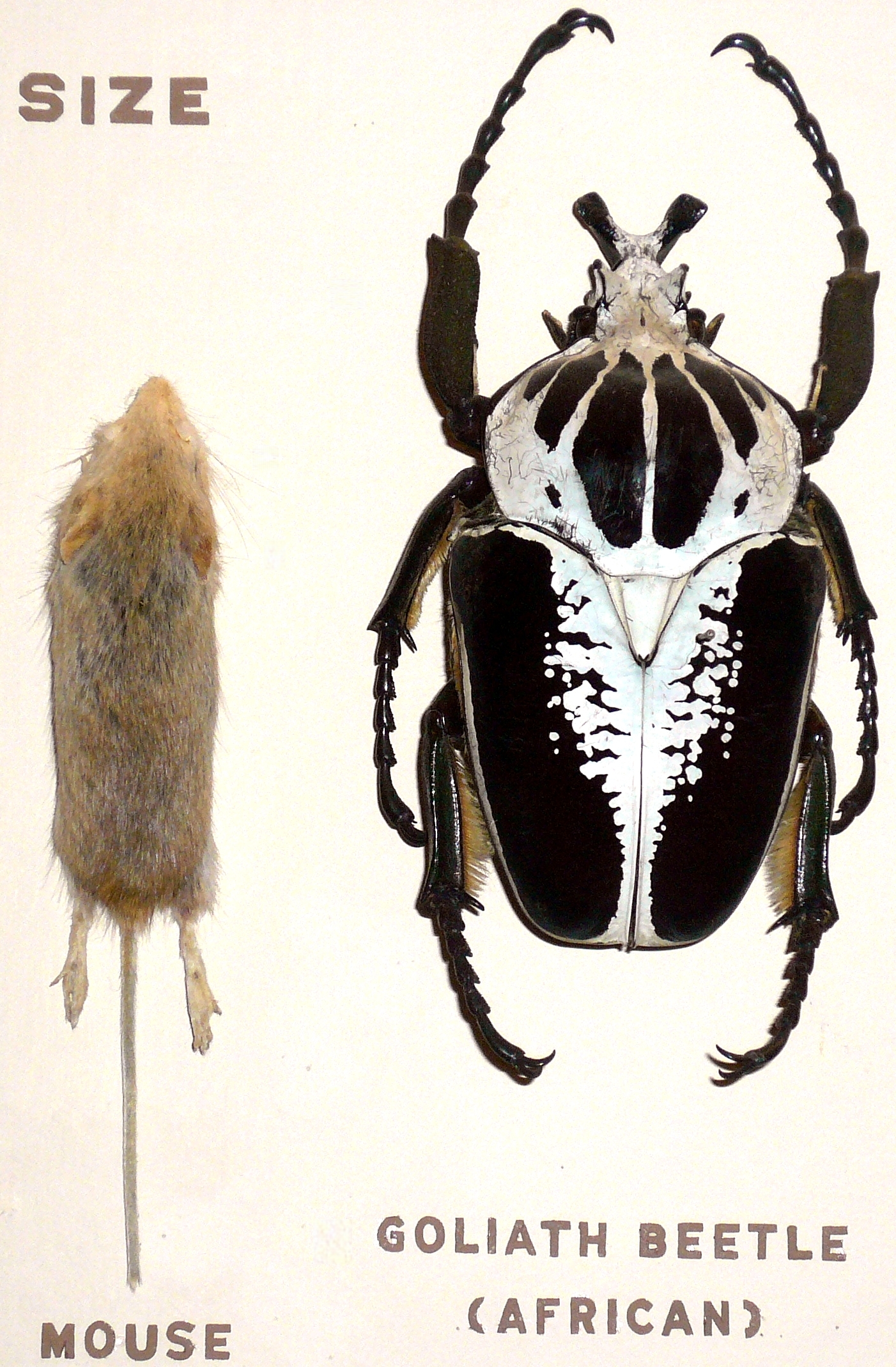
Mouse and Goliathus regius. Field Museum.
