= G. orientalis =

G. orientalis may refer to:

- Garra orientalis, a ray-finned fish species
- Gnophomyia orientalis, a crane fly species in the genus Gnophomyia
- Goliathus orientalis, a Goliath beetle species found in Africa's tropical forests
- Gymnosoma orientalis, a tachinid fly species

== Synonyms ==
- Glottula orientalis, a synonym for Polytela cliens, a moth species found through North Africa and the Sahara to Israel, Jordan, the Arabian Peninsula and to southern Iran
- Grammodes orientalis, a synonym for Grammodes geometrica, a moth species found from the Mediterranean east to Oriental and Australasian tropics
- Grewia orientalis, a synonym for Grewia oxyphylla, a plant species

== See also ==
- Orientalis (disambiguation)
