= Tomarus neglectus =

Scientific classification
- Kingdom: Animalia
- Phylum: Arthropoda
- Class: Insecta
- Order: Coleoptera
- Suborder: Polyphaga
- Infraorder: Scarabaeiformia
- Family: Scarabaeidae
- Genus: Tomarus
- Species: T. neglectus

Binomial name
- Tomarus neglectus (LeConte, 1847)

Species of beetle

Tomarus neglectus is a species of rhinoceros beetle in the family Scarabaeidae.
