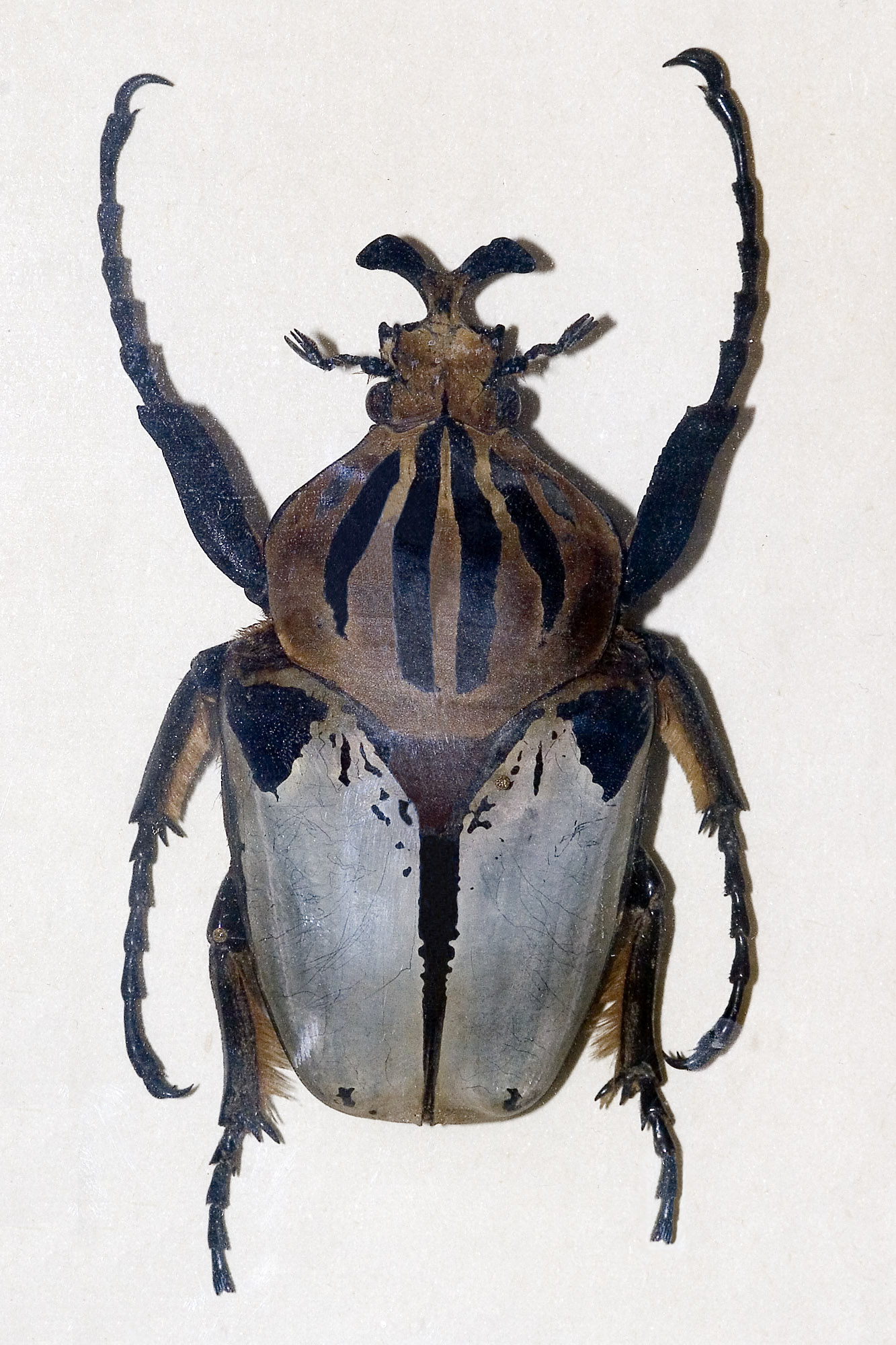

Scientific classification
- Kingdom: Animalia
- Phylum: Arthropoda
- Clade: Pancrustacea
- Class: Insecta
- Order: Coleoptera
- Suborder: Polyphaga
- Infraorder: Scarabaeiformia
- Family: Scarabaeidae
- Genus: Goliathus
- Species: G. cacicus

Binomial name
- Goliathus cacicus (Olivier, 1789)

Synonyms
- List: Scarabaeus cacicus Voet, 1779 (Unav.); Cetonia cacica Olivier, 1789; Goliathus princeps Hope, 1837; Goliathus atlas Nickerl, 1887; Goliathus cacicus quadrimaculatus Sjöstedt, 1928; Goliathus cacicus debilis Endrödi, 1960; Goliathus cacicus decoloratus Endrödi, 1960; Goliathus cacicus decorus Endrödi, 1960; Goliathus cacicus defectus Endrödi, 1960; Goliathus cacicus deletus Endrödi, 1960; Goliathus cacicus divisus Endrödi, 1960; Goliathus cacicus elegans Endrödi, 1960; Goliathus cacicus frequens Endrödi, 1960; Goliathus cacicus imperialis Endrödi, 1960; Goliathus cacicus indecorus Endrödi, 1960; Goliathus cacicus interruptus Endrödi, 1960; Goliathus cacicus maculatus Endrödi, 1960; Goliathus cacicus nigripennis Endrödi, 1960; Goliathus cacicus obscurus Endrödi, 1960; Goliathus cacicus ovatus Endrödi, 1960; Goliathus cacicus pauper Endrödi, 1960; Goliathus cacicus problematicus Endrödi, 1960; Goliathus cacicus uniformis Endrödi, 1960

= Goliathus cacicus =

Species of beetle

Goliathus cacicus, the chief goliath, is a species of beetles of the family Scarabaeidae.

== Description ==
Goliathus cacicus can reach a length of 50–100 millimetres (2.0–3.9 in) in males, of 58–79 millimetres (2.3–3.1 in) in females. The presence of sexual dichromatism in this species of beetle can be traced to the randomly structured filaments in the elytra of both males and females, contributing to vast differences in coloration and luster. Males commonly appear iridescent, while females are white and lack luster and iridescence. Within the last decade, research in Shanghai has further explored the role of structural differences in determining the appearance of the Goliathus cacicus. This research focuses on both visual appearance and the UV scale.

== Distribution ==
This species is present in Liberia, Equatorial Guinea, Ivory Coast, Burkina Faso, Nigeria, Sierra Leone, and Ghana.
