= Goliathus kolbei =

Scientific classification
- Kingdom: Animalia
- Phylum: Arthropoda
- Clade: Pancrustacea
- Class: Insecta
- Order: Coleoptera
- Suborder: Polyphaga
- Infraorder: Scarabaeiformia
- Family: Scarabaeidae
- Genus: Goliathus
- Species: G. kolbei

Binomial name
- Goliathus kolbei (Kraatz, 1895)

Synonyms
- Argyrophegges kolbei Kraatz, 1895; Argyropheges kolbei Kraatz, 1895 (missp.)

Species of beetles

Goliathus kolbei is one of the Goliath beetles, placed in the genus Goliathus, and the sole member of its own subgenus, Argyrophegges (sometimes misspelled as Argyropheges ), which has historically sometimes been treated as a separate genus. It is found in Tanzania.
