= Tomarus subtropicus =

Scientific classification
- Domain: Eukaryota
- Kingdom: Animalia
- Phylum: Arthropoda
- Class: Insecta
- Order: Coleoptera
- Suborder: Polyphaga
- Infraorder: Scarabaeiformia
- Family: Scarabaeidae
- Genus: Tomarus
- Species: T. subtropicus

Binomial name
- Tomarus subtropicus (Blatchley, 1922)

Synonyms
- Ligyrus blatchleyi Cartwright, 1944

Species of beetle

Tomarus subtropicus is a species of rhinoceros beetle in the family Scarabaeidae.
