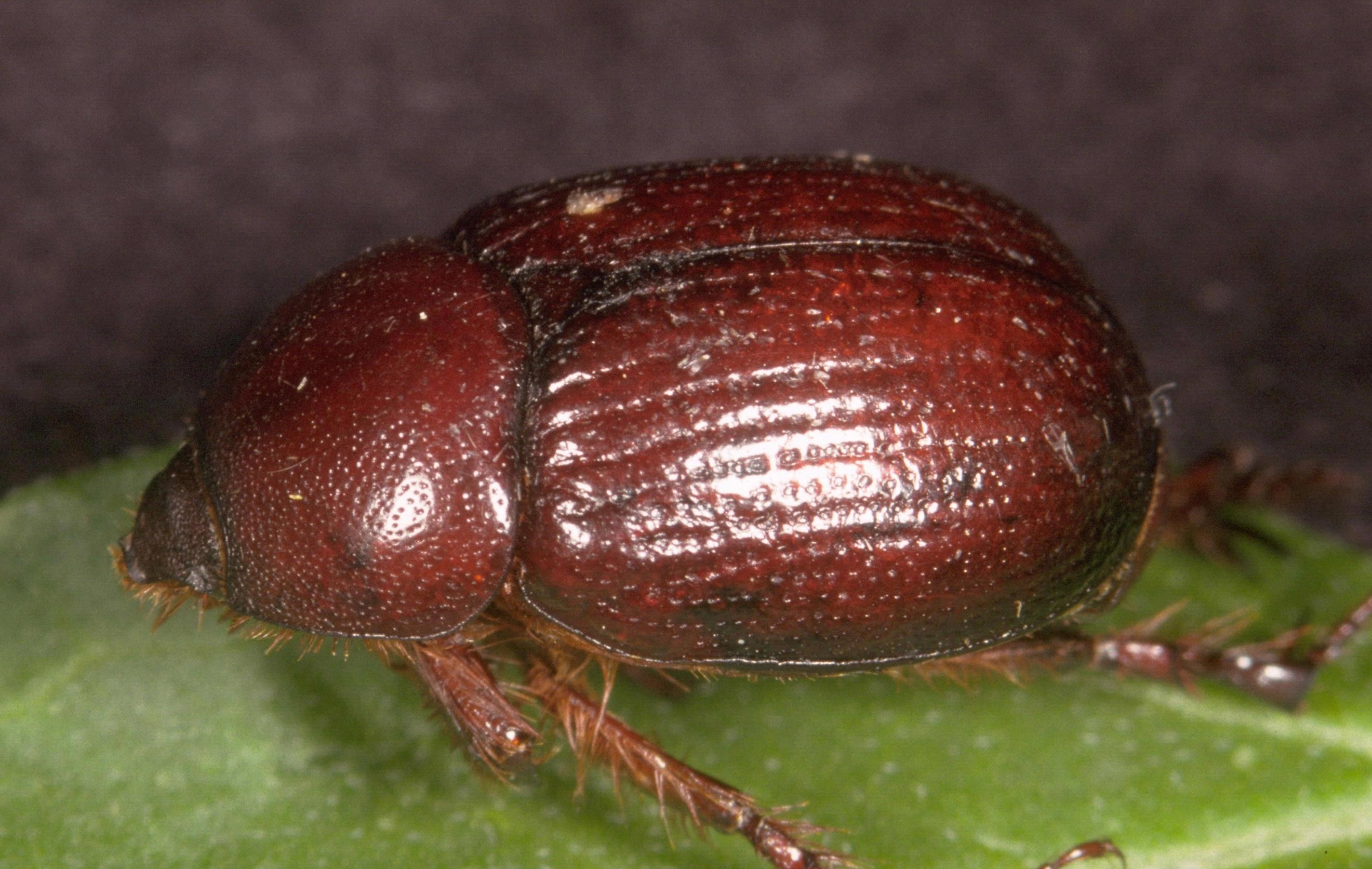

Scientific classification
- Kingdom: Animalia
- Phylum: Arthropoda
- Class: Insecta
- Order: Coleoptera
- Suborder: Polyphaga
- Infraorder: Scarabaeiformia
- Family: Scarabaeidae
- Genus: Ligyrus
- Species: L. gibbosus

Binomial name
- Ligyrus gibbosus (De Geer, 1774)

Synonyms
- Bothynus morio LeConte, 1847; Ligyrus arizonensis Casey, 1915; Ligyrus bicorniculatus Casey, 1915; Ligyrus brevipes Casey, 1915; Ligyrus breviusculus Casey, 1915; Ligyrus californicus Casey, 1909; Ligyrus curtipennis Casey, 1915; Ligyrus effetus Casey, 1915; Ligyrus farctus Casey, 1915; Ligyrus lacustris Casey, 1915; Ligyrus laetulus Casey, 1915; Ligyrus laevicauda Casey, 1915; Ligyrus laticauda Casey, 1915; Ligyrus laticollis Casey, 1915; Ligyrus longulus Casey, 1915; Ligyrus lucublandus Casey, 1915; Ligyrus parallelus Casey, 1915; Ligyrus puncticauda Casey, 1915; Ligyrus remotus Casey, 1915; Ligyrus rubidus Casey, 1915; Ligyrus scitulus Casey, 1915; Ligyrus spissipes Casey, 1909; Ligyrus texanus Casey, 1915; Ligyrus virginicus Casey, 1915; Podalgus variolosus Burmeister, 1847; Scarabaeus juvencus Fabricius, 1775; Tomarus gibbosus (De Geer, 1774)

= Ligyrus gibbosus =

Species of beetle

Ligyrus gibbosus, the carrot beetle, is a species of rhinoceros beetle in the family Scarabaeidae. Adults are 13–17 mm (0.5–0.7 in) long, dark reddish-brown to black, and larvae are white with a dark head. It feeds on roots, grasses, and decaying vegetation in the soil, and is a pest of sunflowers and other crops.

== Systematics ==
L. gibbosus was formerly placed under the genus Tomarus until a 2022 revision by López-García, M.M. and C. Deloya.
