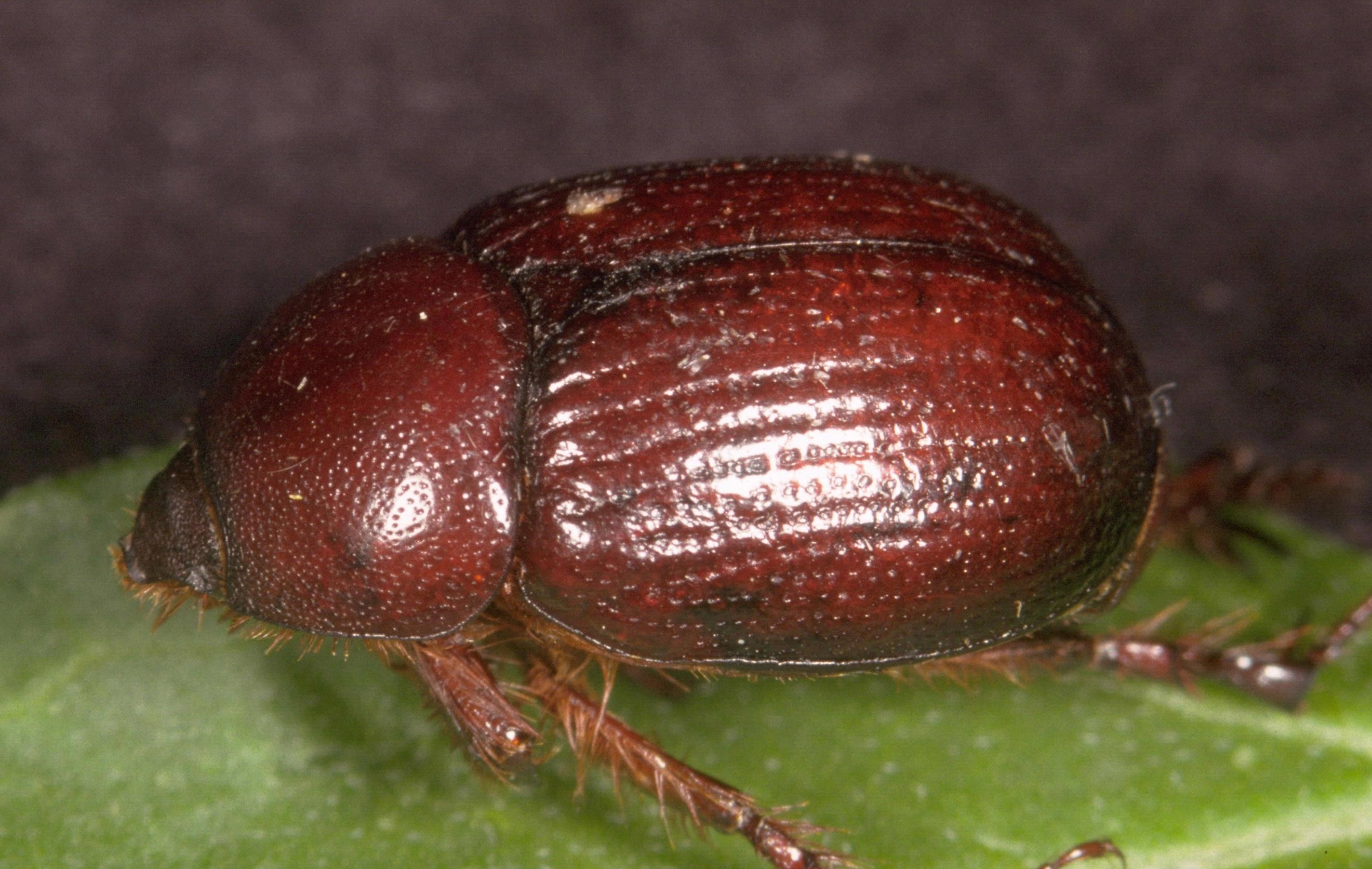
- Ligyrus gibbosus

Scientific classification
- Kingdom: Animalia
- Phylum: Arthropoda
- Clade: Pancrustacea
- Class: Insecta
- Order: Coleoptera
- Suborder: Polyphaga
- Infraorder: Scarabaeiformia
- Family: Scarabaeidae
- Subfamily: Dynastinae
- Tribe: Pentodontini
- Genus: Ligyrus; Burmeister, 1847

= Ligyrus =

Genus of beetles

External image
- Image at iNaturalist

Ligyrus is a genus of beetles in the tribe Pentodontini, from the Americas. It was originally erected by Hermann Burmeister in 1847, then merged with the genus Tomarus, then restored by M.M. López-García and C. Deloya in 2022.

== Species ==
The following are included in BioLib.cz:

subgenus Ligyrodes Casey, 1915

1. Ligyrus peruvianus Endrödi, 1970
2. Ligyrus relictus (Say, 1825)
3. Ligyrus sallaei Bates, 1888

subgenus Ligyrus Burmeister, 1847

1. Ligyrus adoceteus (Ratcliffe & Cave, 2010)
2. Ligyrus allonasutus López-García & Deloya, 2022
3. Ligyrus bidentulus Fairmaire, 1892
4. Ligyrus burmeisteri Steinheil, 1872
5. Ligyrus cicatricosus Prell, 1937
6. Ligyrus cuniculus (Fabricius, 1801)
7. Ligyrus fossor Latreille, 1833
8. Ligyrus gibbosus (DeGeer, 1774) - the carrot beetle
9. Ligyrus nasutus (Burmeister, 1847)
10. Ligyrus neglectus (LeConte, 1847)
11. Ligyrus pullus Prell, 1937
12. Ligyrus rubripes Boheman, 1858
13. Ligyrus villosus (Burmeister, 1847)
