= Tomarus cuniculus =

Scientific classification
- Kingdom: Animalia
- Phylum: Arthropoda
- Clade: Pancrustacea
- Class: Insecta
- Order: Coleoptera
- Suborder: Polyphaga
- Infraorder: Scarabaeiformia
- Family: Scarabaeidae
- Genus: Tomarus
- Species: T. cuniculus

Binomial name
- Tomarus cuniculus (Fabricius, 1801)

Synonyms
- Bothynus obsoletus LeConte, 1847; Heteronychus tumulosus Burmeister, 1847; Scarabaeus antillarum Palisot de Beauvois, 1811

Species of beetle

Tomarus cuniculus is a species of rhinoceros beetle in the family Scarabaeidae.
