= Tomarus sallaei =

Scientific classification
- Domain: Eukaryota
- Kingdom: Animalia
- Phylum: Arthropoda
- Class: Insecta
- Order: Coleoptera
- Suborder: Polyphaga
- Infraorder: Scarabaeiformia
- Family: Scarabaeidae
- Genus: Tomarus
- Species: T. sallaei

Binomial name
- Tomarus sallaei (Bates, 1888)

Synonyms
- Ligyrodes aztecus Casey, 1915; Ligyrodes propinquus Casey, 1915

Species of beetle

Tomarus sallaei is a species of rhinoceros beetle in the family Scarabaeidae.
