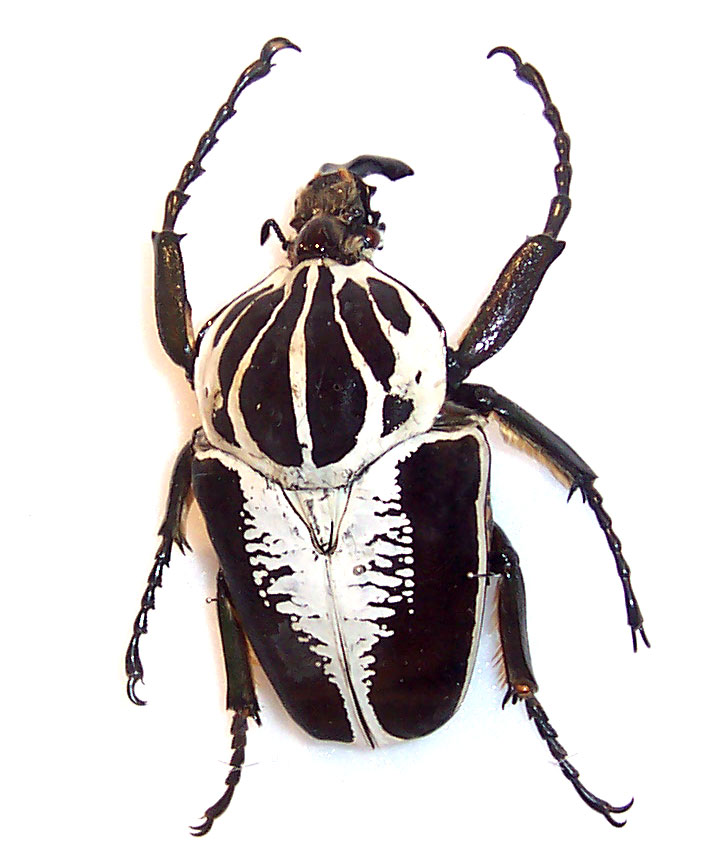
- Goliathus regius

Scientific classification
- Kingdom: Animalia
- Phylum: Arthropoda
- Clade: Pancrustacea
- Class: Insecta
- Order: Coleoptera
- Suborder: Polyphaga
- Infraorder: Scarabaeiformia
- Family: Scarabaeidae
- Subfamily: Cetoniinae
- Tribe: Goliathini
- Subtribe: Goliathina
- Genus: Goliathus; Lamarck, 1801

Species
- 6 (see text)

= Goliathus =

Genus of beetles

The Goliath beetles (named after the biblical giant Goliath) are any of the six species belonging to the genus Goliathus. Goliath beetles are among the largest insects on Earth, if measured in terms of size, bulk and weight. They are members of subfamily Cetoniinae, within the family Scarabaeidae. Goliath beetles can be found in many of Africa's tropical forests, where they feed primarily on tree sap and fruit. Little appears to be known of the larval cycle in the wild, but in captivity, Goliathus beetles have been successfully reared from egg to adult using protein-rich foods, such as commercial cat and dog food. Goliath beetles measure from 6-11 centimeters (2.4-4.3 in) for males and 5-8 centimeters (2.0-3.1 in) for females, as adults, and can reach weights of up to 80–100 grams (2.8–3.5 oz) in the larval stage, though the adults are only about half this weight. The females range from a dark chestnut brown to silky white, but the males are normally brown/white/black or black/white.

Goliath beetles, while not currently evaluated on the IUCN Red List, are facing growing conservation challenges across their African range due to habitat loss, over-collection for the international pet trade, and the potential impacts of climate change.

== Species ==
There are six species of Goliath beetles, with several different subspecies and forms only partially described:

- Goliathus albosignatus Boheman, 1857
- Goliathus cacicus (Olivier, 1789)
- Goliathus goliatus (Linnaeus, 1771)
- Goliathus kolbei (Kraatz, 1895)
- Goliathus orientalis Moser, 1909
- Goliathus regius Klug, 1835

== Life cycle ==
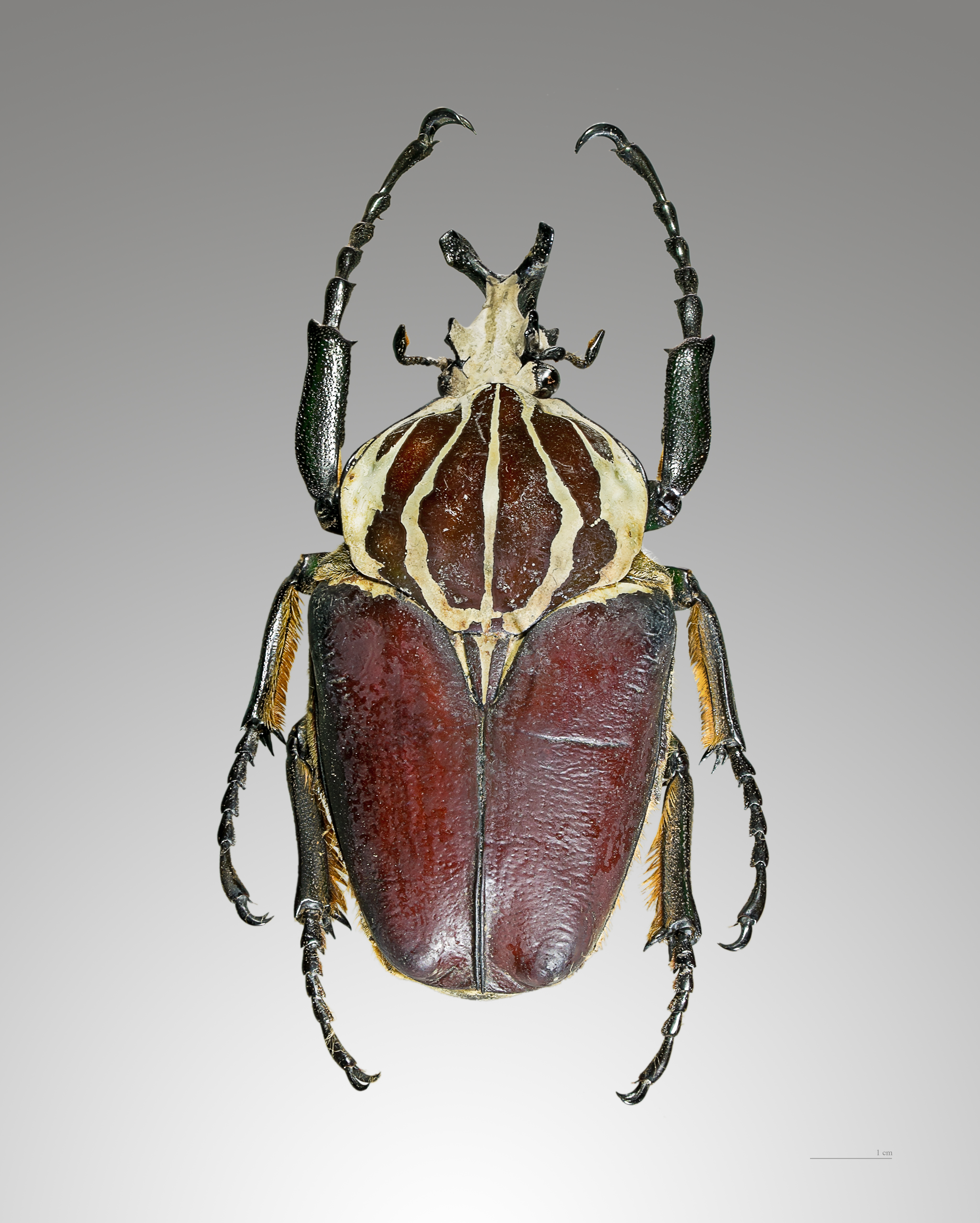
Goliathus goliatus (Goliath beetle)

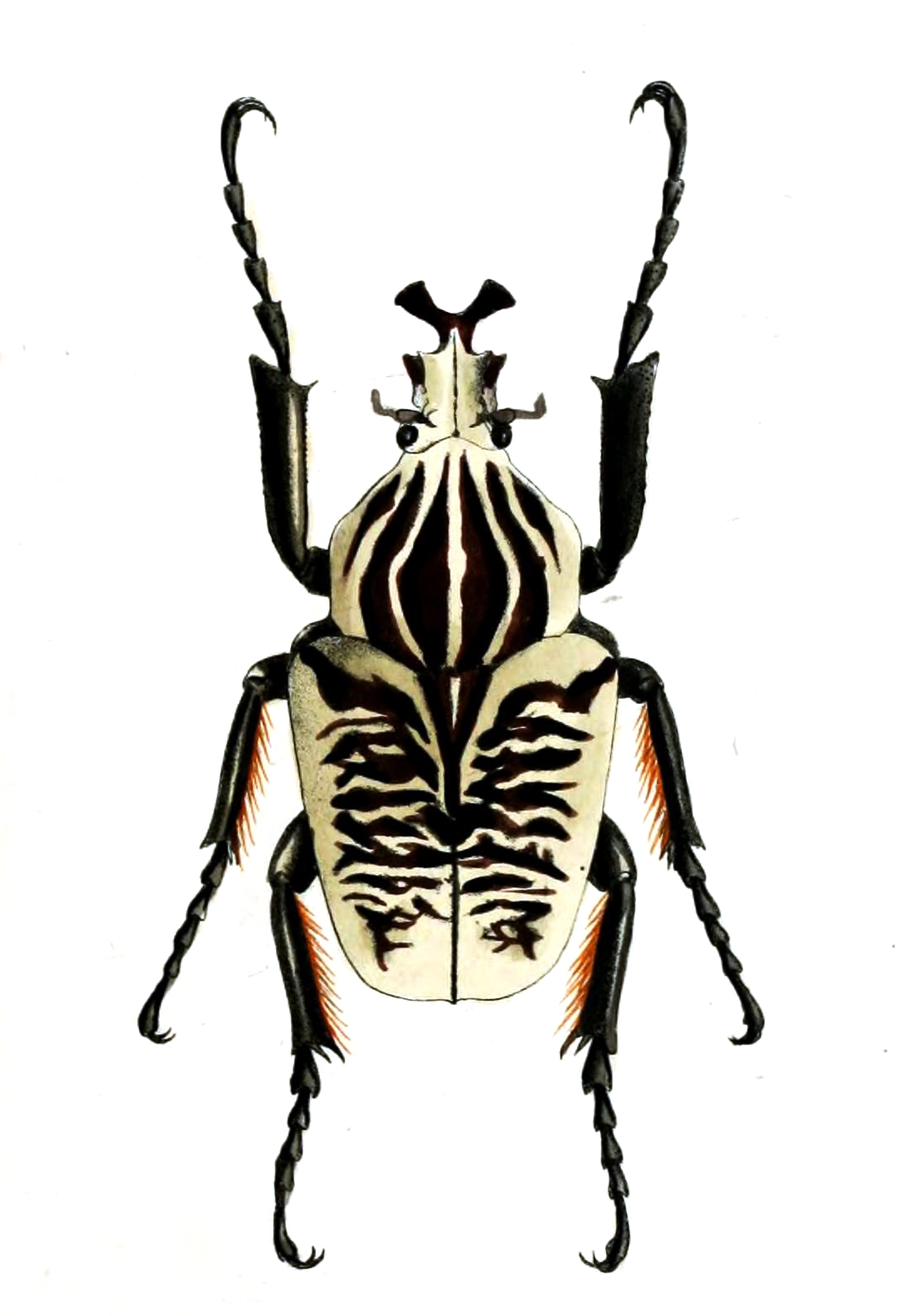
G. albosignatus

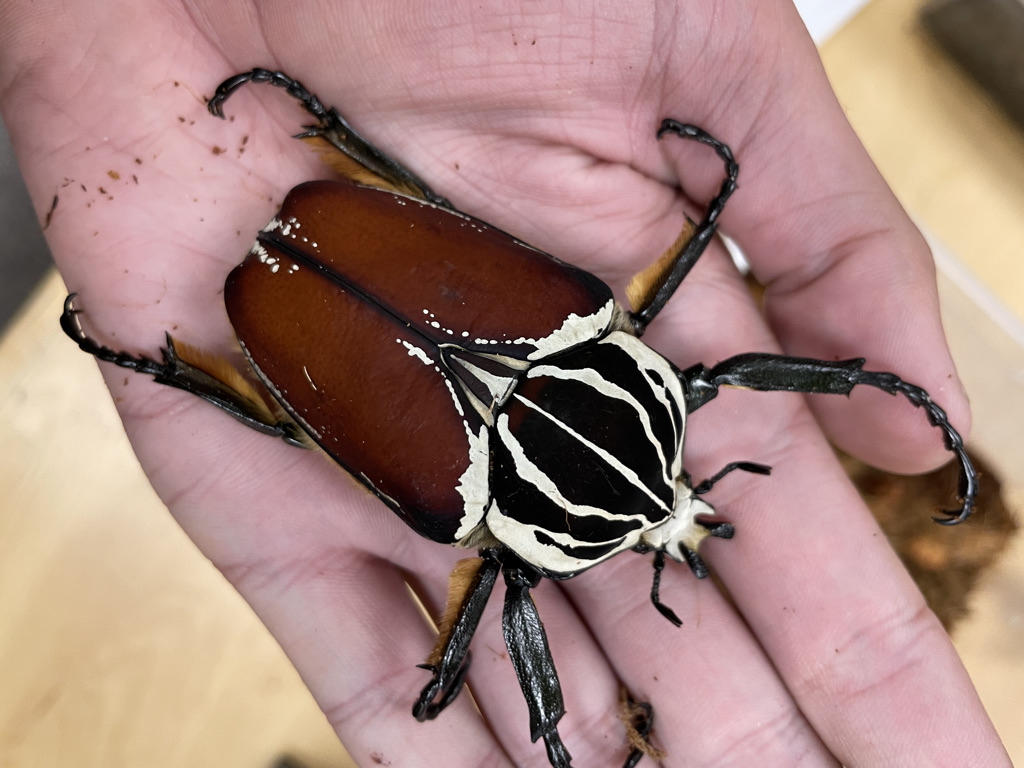
Goliath Beetle with hand for scale

Goliathus larvae are somewhat unusual among cetoniine scarabs in that they have a greater need for high-protein foods than do those of most other genera. Pellets of dry or soft dog or cat food (buried in the rearing substrate on a regular schedule) provide a suitable diet for Goliathus larvae in captivity. However, a substrate of somewhat moistened, decayed leaves and wood should still be provided in order to create a suitable medium for larval growth. The young stage larvae (1st instar) will eat some of this material. Even under optimum conditions, the larvae take a number of months to mature fully because of the great size they attain. They are capable of growing up to 250 millimetres (9.8 in) in length and reaching weights in excess of 100 grams (3.5 oz).

When maximum size is reached, the larva constructs a rather thin-walled, hardened cell of sandy soil in which it will undergo pupation and metamorphose to the adult state. Once building of this cocoon is completed, the larva transforms to the pupal stage, which is an intermediate phase between the larval and adult stages. During the pupal duration, the insect's tissues are broken down and re-organized into the form of the adult beetle. Once metamorphosis is complete, the insect sheds its pupal skin and undergoes a period of hibernation as an adult beetle until the dry season ends. When the rains begin, the beetle breaks open its cocoon, locates a mate, and the entire life cycle starts over again. The adult beetles feed on materials rich in sugar, especially tree sap and fruit. Under captive conditions, adults can sometimes live for about a year after emerging from their pupal cells. Longevity in the wild is likely to be shorter on average due to factors such as predators and weather. The adult phase concentrates solely on reproduction, and once this function is performed, the time of the adult beetle is limited, as is true for the vast majority of other insect species.

== Description ==
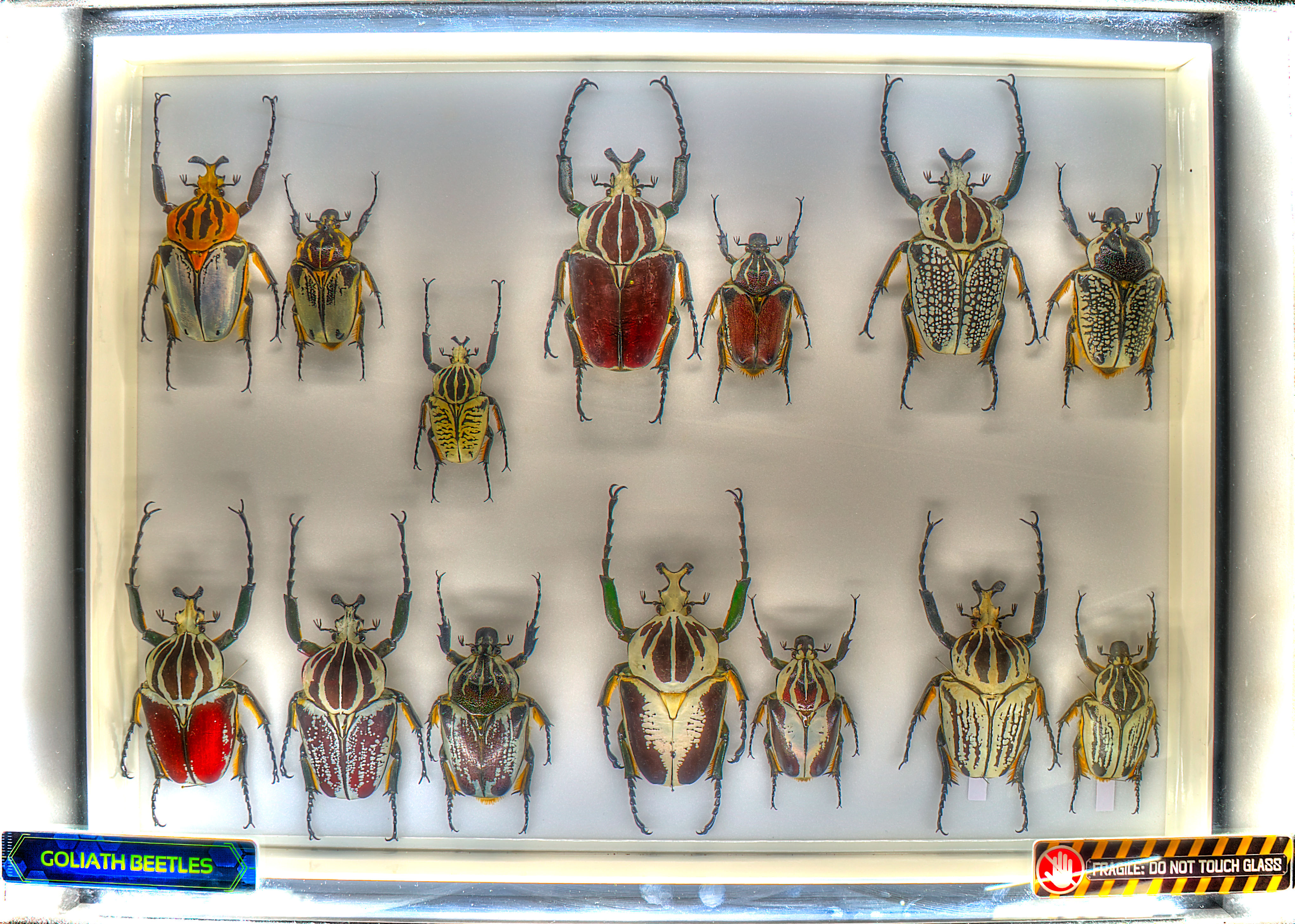
Collection of Goliath beetles

The bulky bodies of Goliath beetles are composed of a thick and hardened exoskeleton, which protects their organs and hindwings. Like most beetles, they possess reinforced forewings (called elytra) that act as protective covers for their hindwings and abdomen. Only the hindwings (which are large and membranous) are actually used for flying, while the elytra are kept completely closed; flying with closed elytra is universal among cetoniine scarabs but rare in other beetles. When not in use, the wings are kept completely folded beneath the elytra. Each of the beetle's legs ends in a pair of sharp claws, which provide a strong grip used for climbing on tree trunks and branches.

Males have a Y-shaped horn on the head, which is used as a pry bar in battles with other males over feeding sites or mates. Females lack horns and instead have a wedge-shaped head that assists in burrowing when they lay eggs. In addition to their massive size, Goliath beetles are strikingly patterned; prominent markings common to all of the Goliathus species are the sharply contrasting black vertical stripes on the pronotum (thoracic shield), while the various species may be most reliably distinguished based on their distinctive mix of elytral colors and patterns.

== See also ==
- Insect fighting
- List of largest insects
