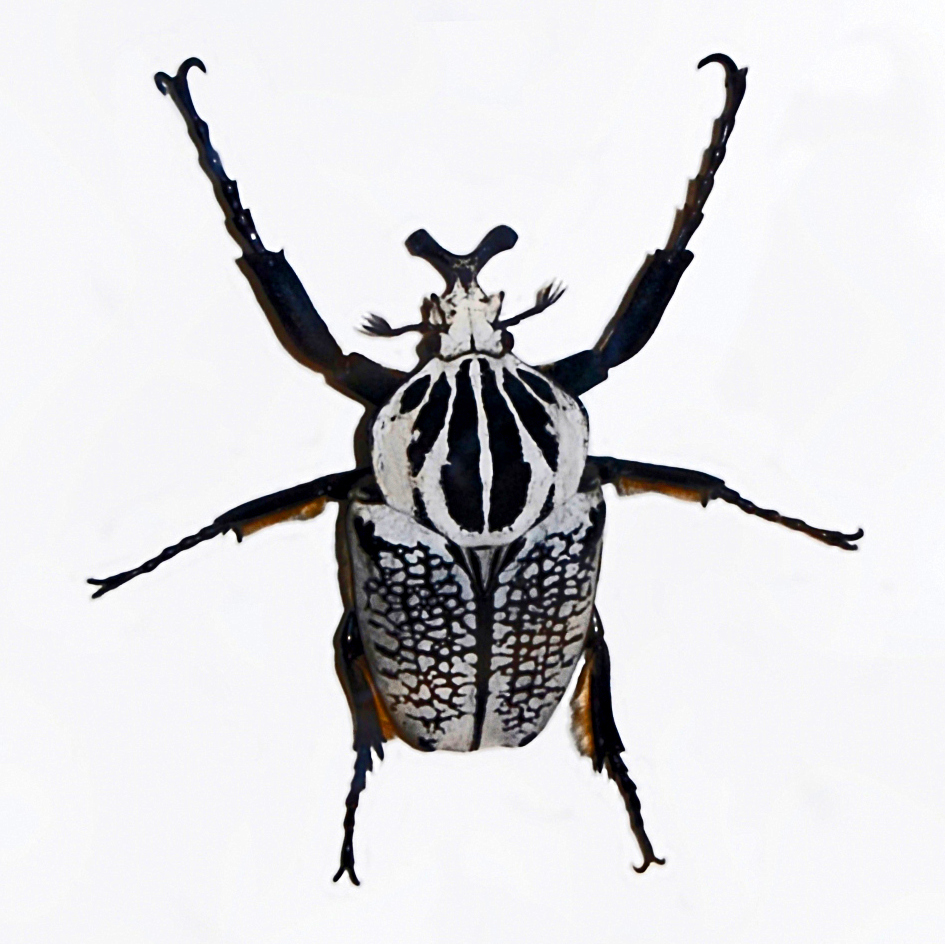
- Male of Goliathus orientalis. Mounted specimen on display at the Museo Civico di Storia Naturale di Milano

Scientific classification
- Kingdom: Animalia
- Phylum: Arthropoda
- Clade: Pancrustacea
- Class: Insecta
- Order: Coleoptera
- Suborder: Polyphaga
- Infraorder: Scarabaeiformia
- Family: Scarabaeidae
- Genus: Goliathus
- Species: G. orientalis

Binomial name
- Goliathus orientalis Moser, 1909

Synonyms
- Goliathus giganteus orientalis Moser, 1909; Goliathus goliathus kindanus Endrödi, 1951 (Unav.); Goliathus goliathus preissi Endrödi, 1951

= Goliathus orientalis =

Species of beetle

Goliathus orientalis is a species of beetles belonging to the family Scarabaeidae.

== Subspecies ==
- G. orientalis orientalis Moser, 1909
- G. orientalis usambarensis Preiss, 1933

== Description ==
Goliathus orientalis is one of the largest species of the genus Goliathus, with a body length of about 50–100 millimetres (2.0–3.9 in) in males, of about 50–65 millimetres (2.0–2.6 in) in females.

The body is broad and flat. Elytra are whitish with a complex pattern of black markings usually in the form of black rings. Pronotum (thoracic shield) usually shows large black longitudinal stripes or a large black area. This usual pattern may differ greatly in the subspecies. The head bears a black Y-shaped horn in males, used in battles with other males. Legs are long, powerful, black. Despite its large body, these beetles fly well. They have a large and membranous secondary pair of wings. When not in use, these wings are kept completely folded beneath the elytra. These beetles feed primarily on tree sap and fruits.

== Life cycle ==
The larvae live in the soil and need a protein-rich diet, because they grow very quickly. Even under optimum conditions, the larvae take about 4 months to mature fully, which corresponds to the duration of the rainy season. Larvae can reach a length of about 130 millimetres (5.1 in) and a weight of about 100 grams (3.5 oz). When maximum size is reached, the larva constructs a pupal chamber in which it will undergo metamorphosis to the adult state. In this stage they spend most of the dry season, and the adult does not emerge before the rainy season.

== Distribution and habitat ==
This species is present in the Democratic Republic of the Congo, Tanzania., Angola, and Zambia. It can be found in the savannah, in shady areas with trees. It can also be found sipping sap from certain trees in groups of 3 or more.

== Gallery ==
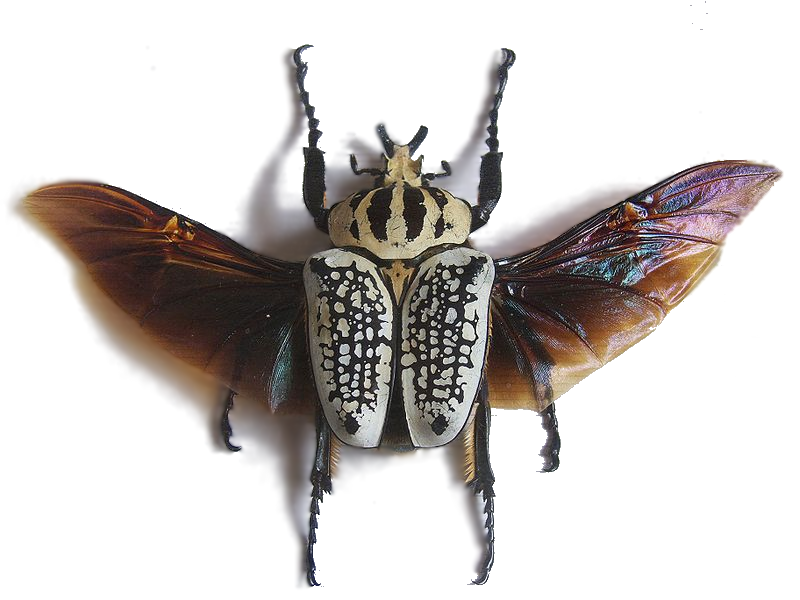
Male, spread wings

== In the pet trade ==
This species is extremely valued in captivity. Adults are generally wild caught rather than captive bred.

In captivity they may be fed on commercial cat and dog food. The pupal cell is made with sand, and larvae are generally reared on dog, fish or ferret food, as they do not consume dead leaf matter. They take approximately a year and a half to mature in captivity and wild individuals most likely take longer. They are prone to cannibalising other beetles of their or other species. In captivity the adults can live over a year, but in the wild life is probably much shorter.
