= Ligyrus relictus =

Scientific classification
- Domain: Eukaryota
- Kingdom: Animalia
- Phylum: Arthropoda
- Class: Insecta
- Order: Coleoptera
- Suborder: Polyphaga
- Infraorder: Scarabaeiformia
- Family: Scarabaeidae
- Genus: Ligyrus
- Species: L. relictus

Binomial name
- Ligyrus relictus (Say, 1825)

Synonyms
- Ligyrodes clypealis Casey, 1915; Ligyrodes dawsoni Casey, 1924; Ligyrodes parviceps Casey, 1915; Ligyrodes quadripennis Casey, 1915; Ligyrodes vernicicollis Casey, 1915; Tomarus relictus (Say, 1825)

Species of beetle

Ligyrus relictus is a species of rhinoceros beetle in the family Scarabaeidae. It is found in North America.
