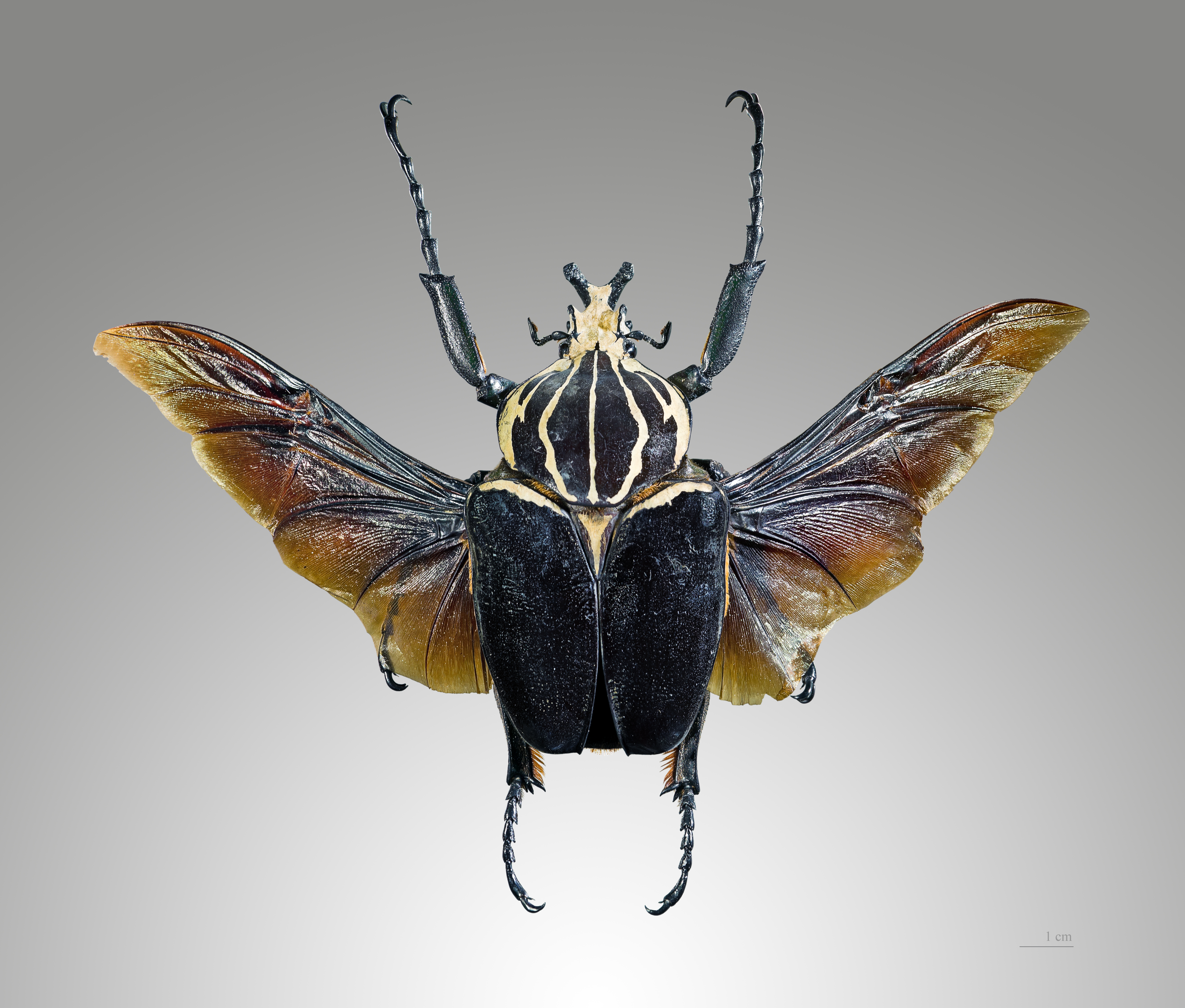
- Goliathus goliatus, flying position
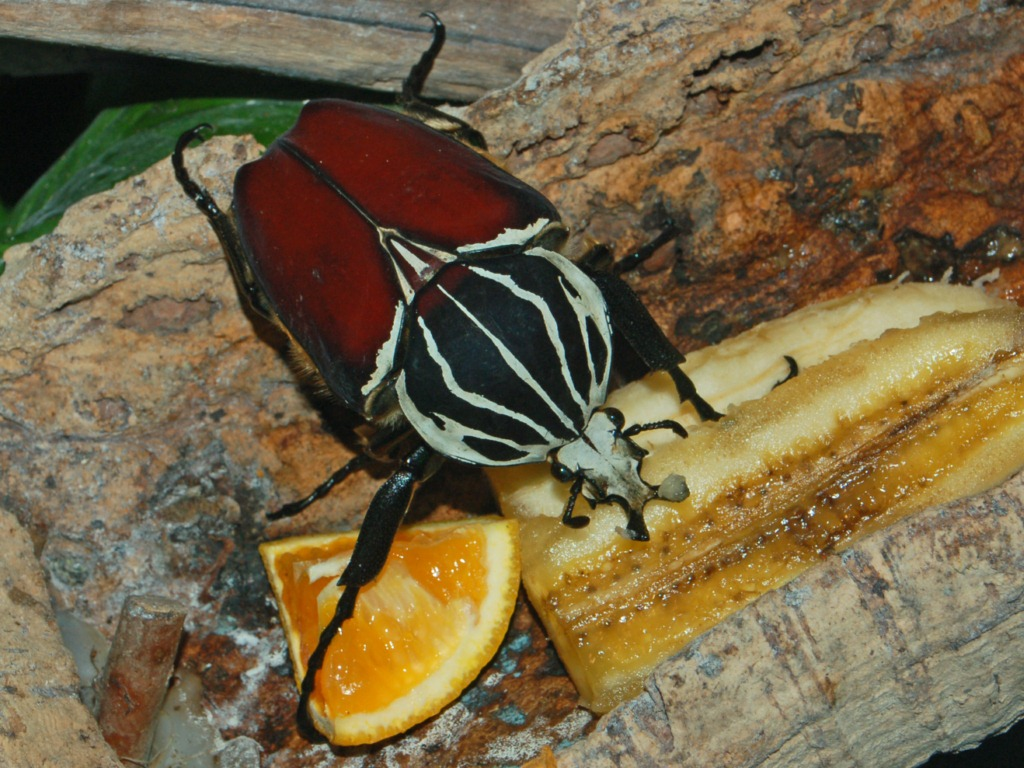
- Dorsal view of Goliathus goliatus at the Montreal Insectarium

Scientific classification
- Kingdom: Animalia
- Phylum: Arthropoda
- Clade: Pancrustacea
- Class: Insecta
- Order: Coleoptera
- Suborder: Polyphaga
- Infraorder: Scarabaeiformia
- Family: Scarabaeidae
- Genus: Goliathus
- Species: G. goliatus

Binomial name
- Goliathus goliatus (Linnaeus, 1771)

Synonyms
- List: (list includes synonyms of meleagris, sometimes treated as a subspecies); Scarabaeus goliatus Linnaeus, 1771; Scarabaeus goliath Sulzer, 1776 (Missp.); Scarabaeus goliathus Goeze, 1777 (Emend.); Goliathus africanus Lamarck, 1801; Goliathus giganteus Lamarck, 1817; Goliathus imperialis Klug, 1835; Goliathus magnus Duncan, 1835; Goliathus drurii Macleay, 1838; Goliathus giganteus conspersus Kraatz, 1889; Goliathus giganteus marginatus Kraatz, 1889; Goliathus giganteus marginifer Kraatz, 1889; Goliathus giganteus quadrimaculatus Kraatz, 1889; Goliathus giganteus apicalis Kraatz, 1895; Goliathus intermedius Kraatz, 1895; Goliathus giganteus nigripes Kraatz, 1895; Goliathus giganteus albatus Kraatz, 1897; Goliathus giganteus confluens Kraatz, 1897; Goliathus giganteus interruptus Kraatz, 1897; Goliathus giganteus undulatus Kraatz, 1897; Goliathus giganteus conjunctivittis Kraatz, 1898; Goliathus giganteus curtivittis Kraatz, 1898; Goliathus giganteus longivittis Kraatz, 1898; Goliathus giganteus connectens Csiki, 1904; Goliathus giganteus grandis Veen, 1904; Goliathus meleagris Sjöstedt, 1927; Goliathus meleagris conjugatus Sjöstedt, 1928; Goliathus meleagris divergens Sjöstedt, 1928; Goliathus meleagris maculatus Sjöstedt, 1928; Goliathus meleagris niveus Sjöstedt, 1928; Goliathus meleagris nyassae Sjöstedt, 1928; Goliathus meleagris oculatus Sjöstedt, 1928; Goliathus meleagris partitus Sjöstedt, 1928; Goliathus meleagris pustulatus Sjöstedt, 1928; Goliathus meleagris pustuliferus Sjöstedt, 1928; Goliathus meleagris quadrangulatus Sjöstedt, 1928; Goliathus meleagris varians Sjöstedt, 1928; Goliathus goliathus adspersus Sjöstedt, 1928; Goliathus confluens albovariegatus Sjöstedt, 1928; Goliathus goliathus hieroglyphicus Sjöstedt, 1928; Goliathus confluens striatus Sjöstedt, 1928; Goliathus goliathus undulus Sjöstedt, 1928; Goliathus goliathus albipennis Endrödi, 1960; Goliathus goliathus guttatus Endrödi, 1960; Goliathus goliathus palmatus Endrödi, 1960; Goliathus goliathus trivittatus Endrödi, 1960; Goliathus goliathus vittiger Endrödi, 1960

= Goliathus goliatus =

Species of beetle

Goliathus goliatus is a very large species of beetle of the family Scarabaeidae, native to tropical Africa.

== Description ==
Goliathus goliatus is one of the largest species in the genus Goliathus and one of the largest insects in general, males having a body length of 50–110 millimetres (2.0–4.3 in) and females having a body length of 54–80 millimetres (2.1–3.1 in). The pronotum (thoracic shield) is mainly black, with whitish longitudinal stripes, while the elytra are mostly dark brown in the typical form. The color of the elytra may differ greatly in some other forms, with varying amounts and patterns of brown, white and black. The elytra are mostly white in the "quadrimaculatus" form, which (along with various intermediate forms that have been named "albatus", "apicalis", "conspersus", "hieroglyphicus" and "undulatus") occur together with the more common brown typical form in Benin, eastern Nigeria and western Cameroon.

This species possess a large and membranous secondary pair of wings actually used for flying. When not in use, they are kept completely folded beneath the elytra. The head is whitish, with a black Y-shaped horn in males, used as a pry bar in battles with other males over feeding sites or mates. These beetles feed primarily on tree sap and fruits.

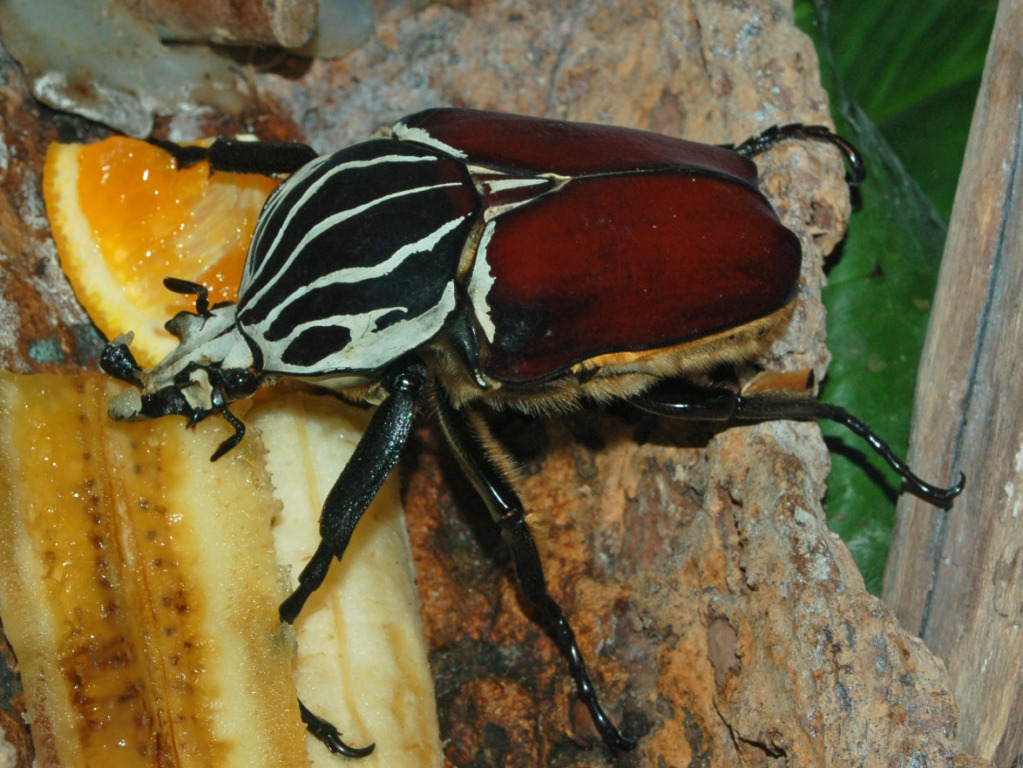
Goliathus goliatus male, at the Montreal Insectarium

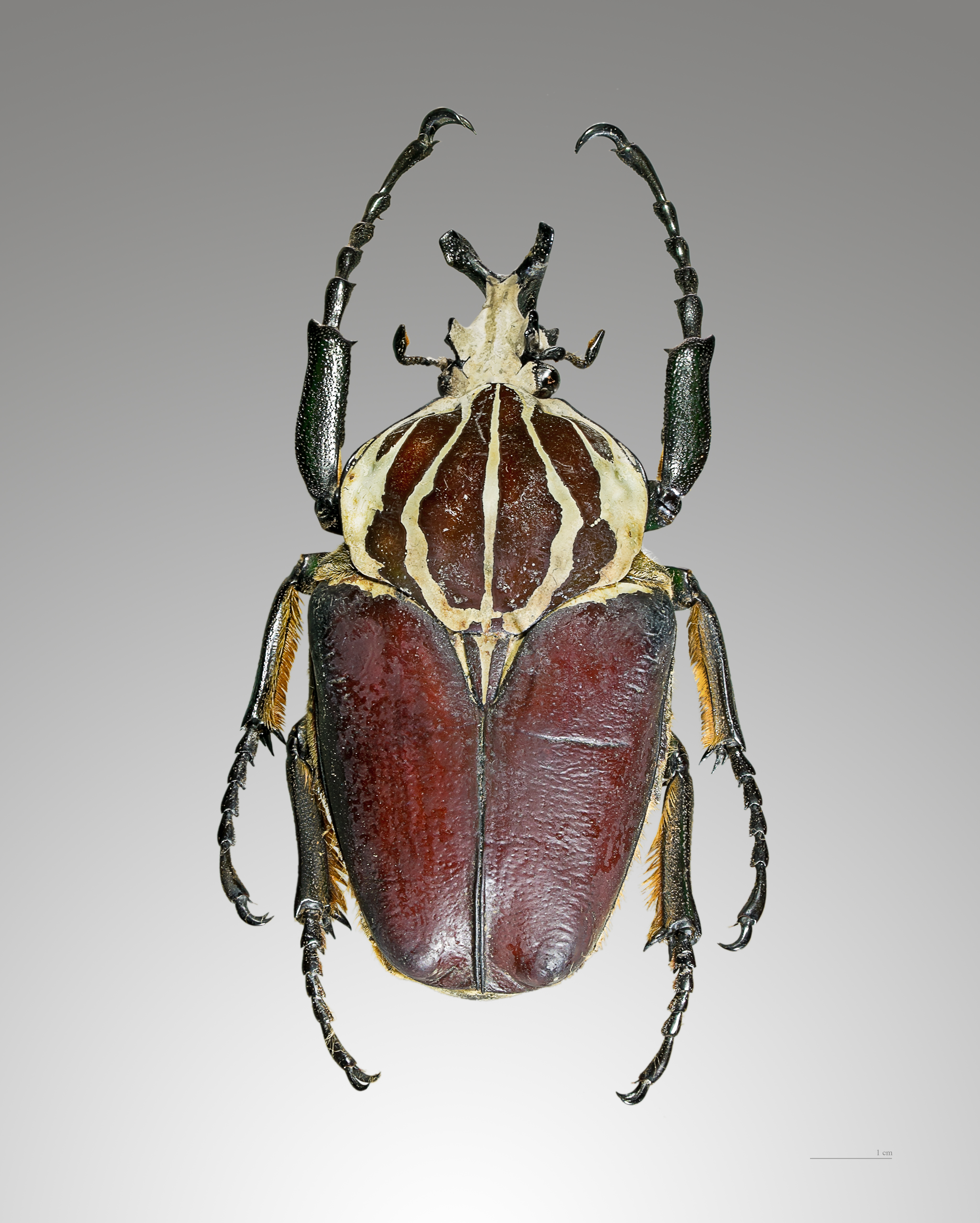
Goliathus goliatus male, dorsal side

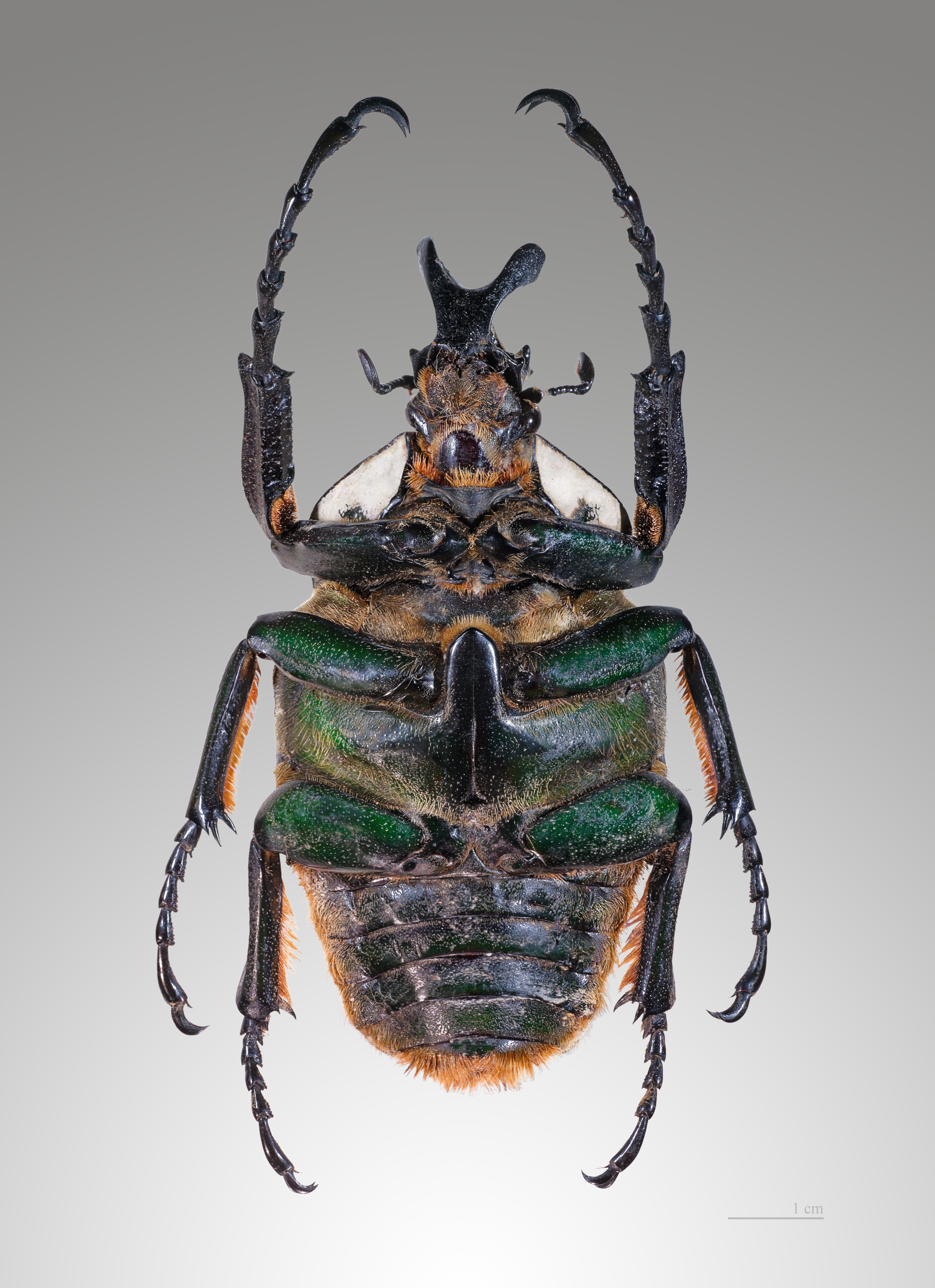
Goliathus goliatus male, ventral side

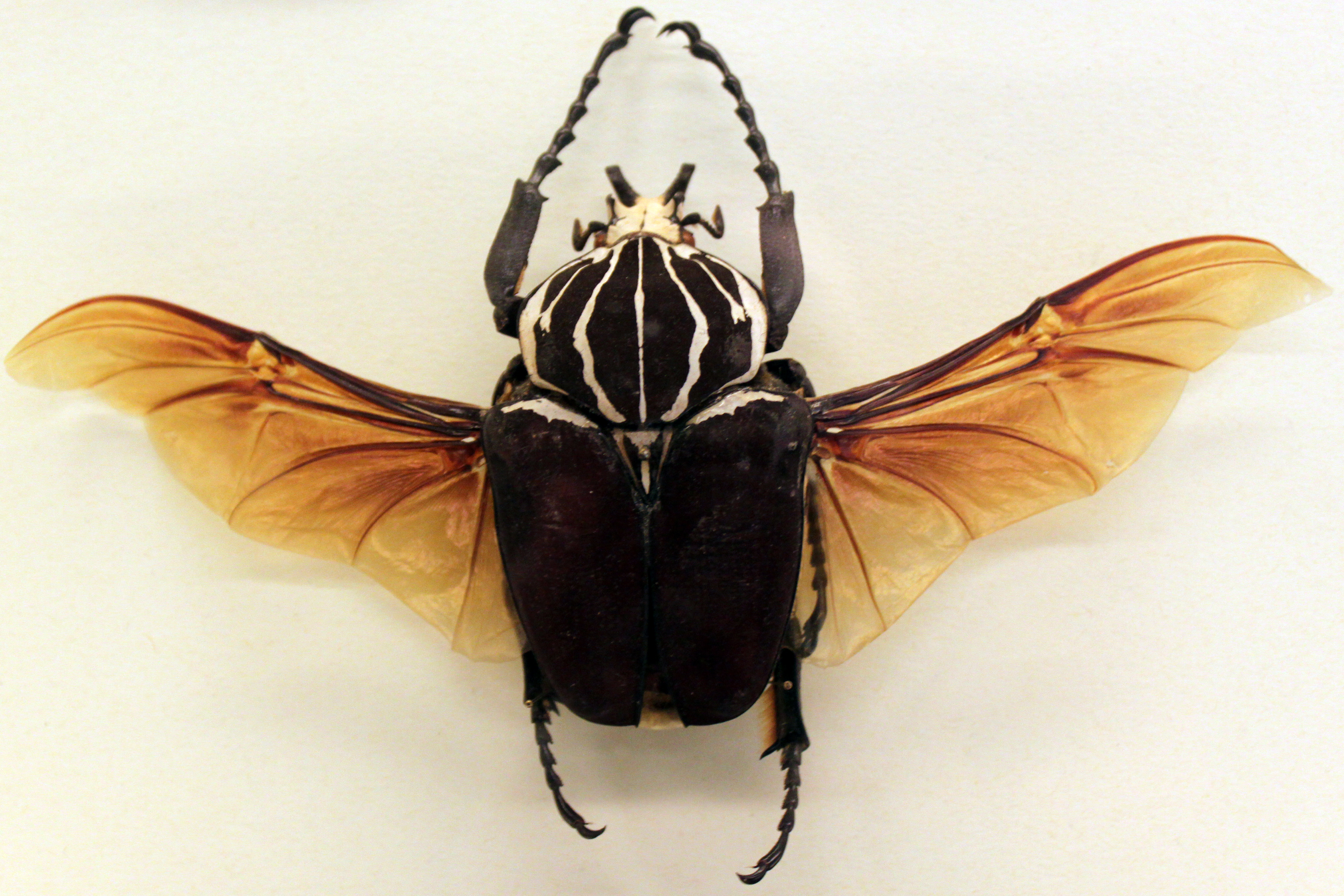
Goliathus goliatus, male, with spread wings

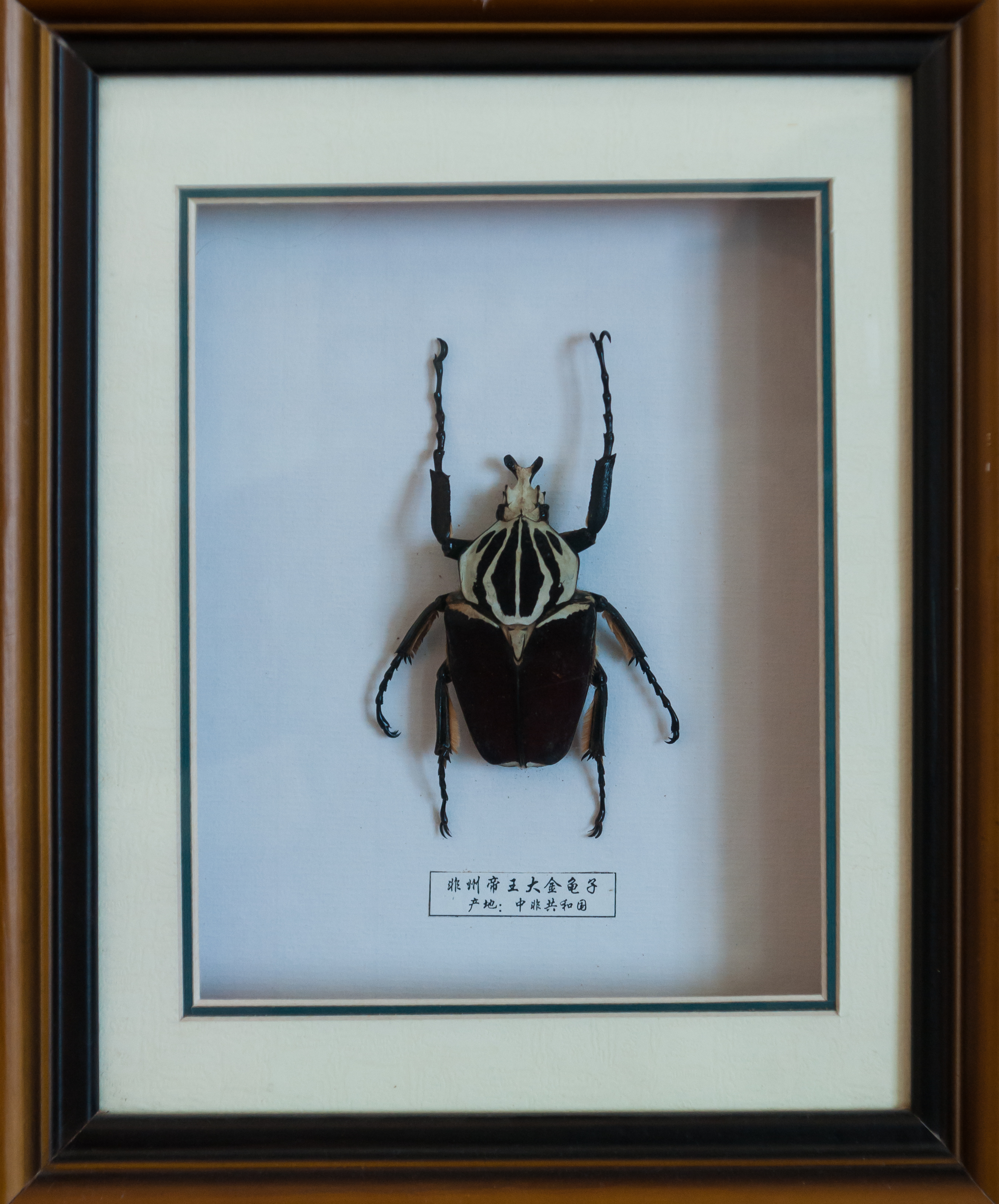
Goliathus goliatus form "apicalis"

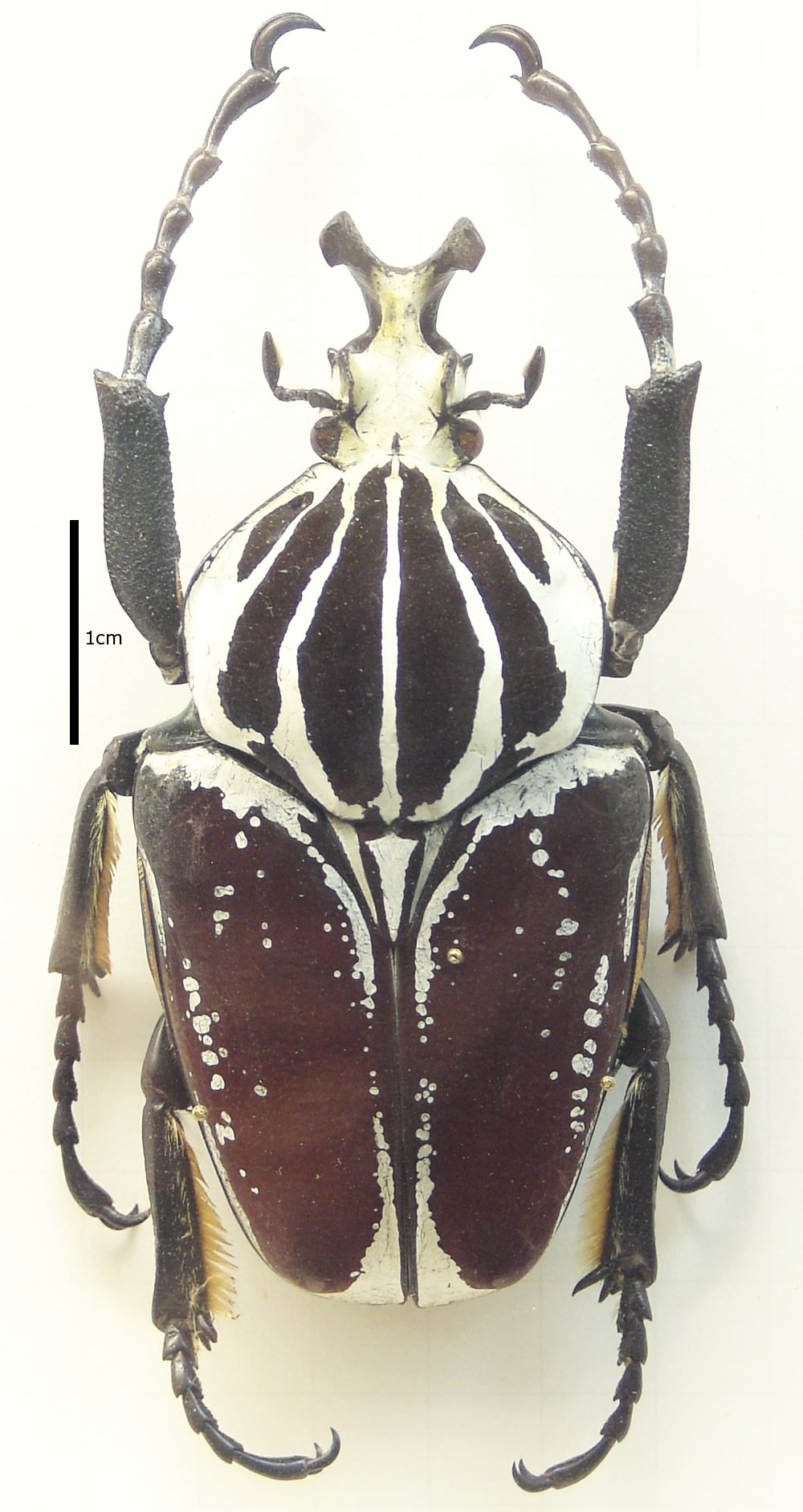
Goliathus goliatus form "conspersus"

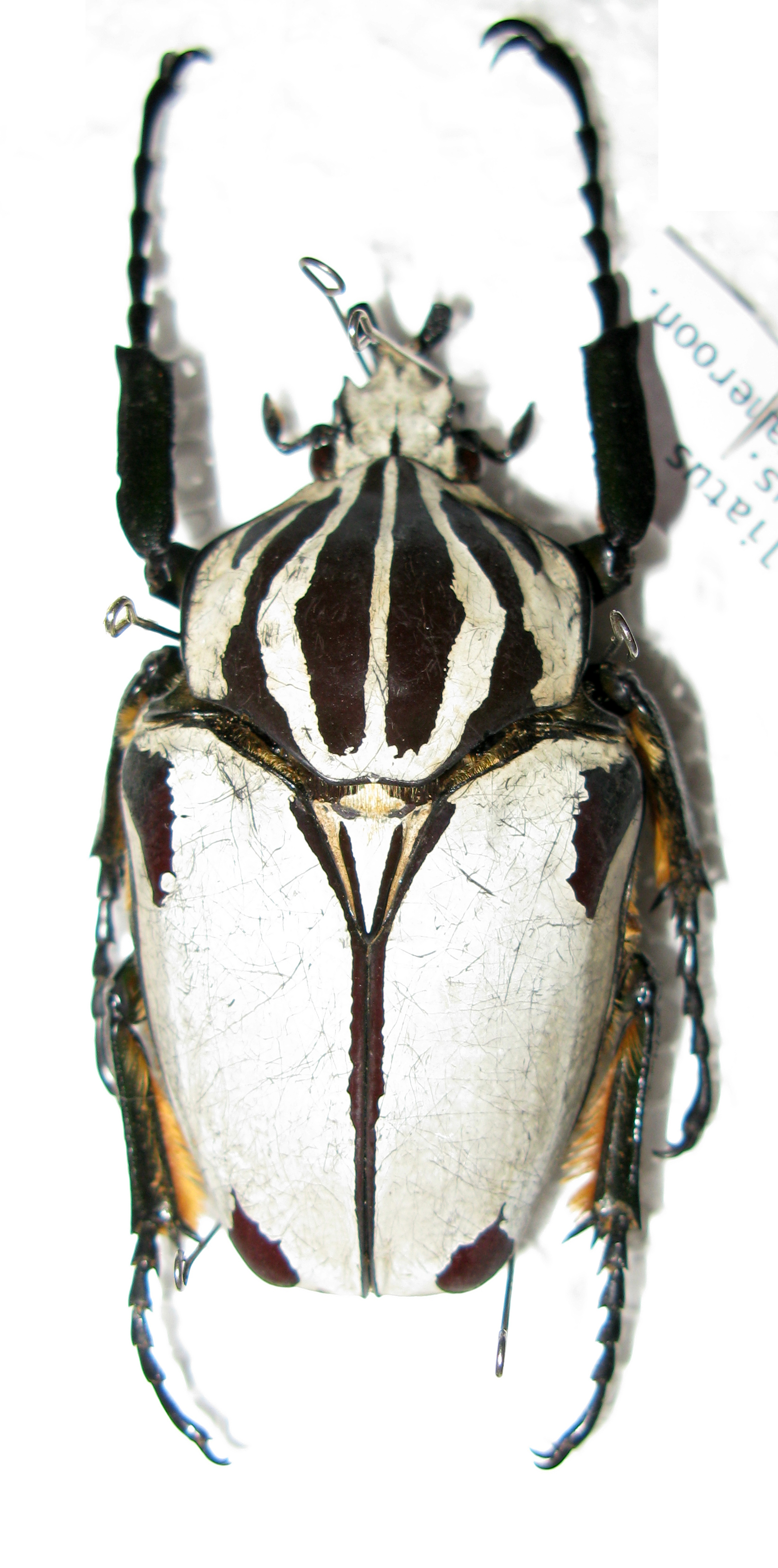
Goliathus goliatus form "quadrimaculatus"

== Distribution ==
This species is widespread from western to eastern equatorial Africa (Nigeria, Cameroon, Central African Republic, Gabon, Republic of the Congo, Democratic Republic of the Congo, Uganda, Western Kenya and Northwestern Tanzania).

== Habitat ==
Goliathus goliatus is mainly present in the equatorial forests and in the sub-equatorial savannah.

== Exhibited in 1959 at New York City museum ==
On January 1, 1959, a species from Gabon, believed to be the first such beetle seen alive in the United States, went on display at the American Museum of Natural History.

== See also ==
- List of largest insects
