= Sebö Endrödi =

Hungarian lawyer (1903–1984)

Sebö Endrödi (18 October 1903 – 18 December 1984) was a Hungarian lawyer and entomologist who specialized in the subfamily Dynastinae of the Scarab beetles. He was the author of a landmark monograph on the Dynastinae of the World which was published shortly after his death.

Endrödi was born in Kassa, Hungary and went to study law, receiving a doctorate in 1931. He took an interest in beetles at an early age, growing up in the Börzsöny Mountains. He retired from law in 1966 and became an associate at the Hungarian Museum of Natural History. His first publication on beetles was on the genus Oryctes and was based on the Rassenkreis theory. He also published in the Magyarorszag Allatvilaga ("Fauna Hungariae") on the Cerambycid beetles. He was made an honorary Doctor of Biological Sciences in 1957. He died before his landmark monograph on the Dynastinae could be published. He is buried at Verocemaros, Hungary. His son Sebo Endrody-Younga also became an entomologist who worked in South Africa.
