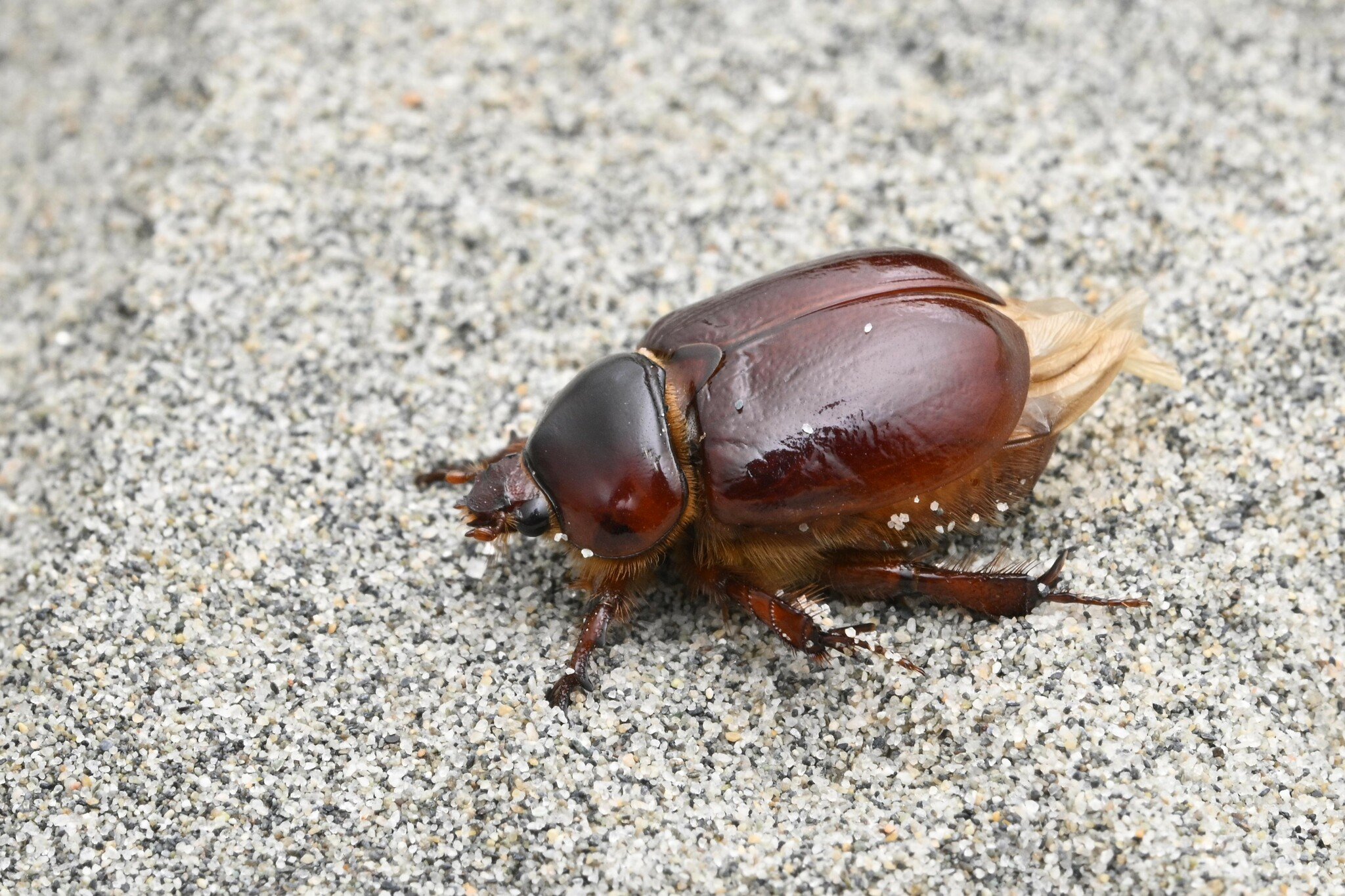
- Pericoptus punctatus seen at Farewell Spit

Scientific classification
- Domain: Eukaryota
- Kingdom: Animalia
- Phylum: Arthropoda
- Class: Insecta
- Order: Coleoptera
- Suborder: Polyphaga
- Infraorder: Scarabaeiformia
- Family: Scarabaeidae
- Genus: Pericoptus
- Species: P. punctatus

Binomial name
- Pericoptus punctatus (White, 1846)

= Pericoptus punctatus =

Species of beetle

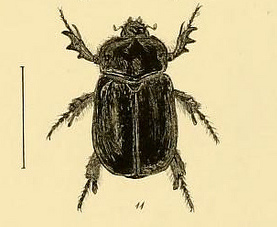
Drawing of Pericoptus punctatus, originally described as Cheiroplatys punctatus

Pericoptus punctatus is a sand scarab beetle that is endemic to New Zealand. It is a smaller and similar New Zealand scarab beetle species to Pericoptus truncatus.

This beetle can be found in sandy coastal areas throughout New Zealand. The adult beetle is nocturnal and obtains the size of approximately 16 – 22 mm in length. It normally spends the daylight hours buried under sand or vegetation such as Marram grass or driftwood. It can fly and is likely to be attracted to lights in the evening.

== Taxonomy ==
This species was originally described by Adam White and named Cheiroplatys punctatus in The Zoology of the Voyage of HMS Erebus & HMS Terror in 1846 from a specimen collected by Percy William Earl and obtained from him during the Ross expedition. The type specimen for this species was collected in Waikouaiti and is held at the Natural History Museum, London.
