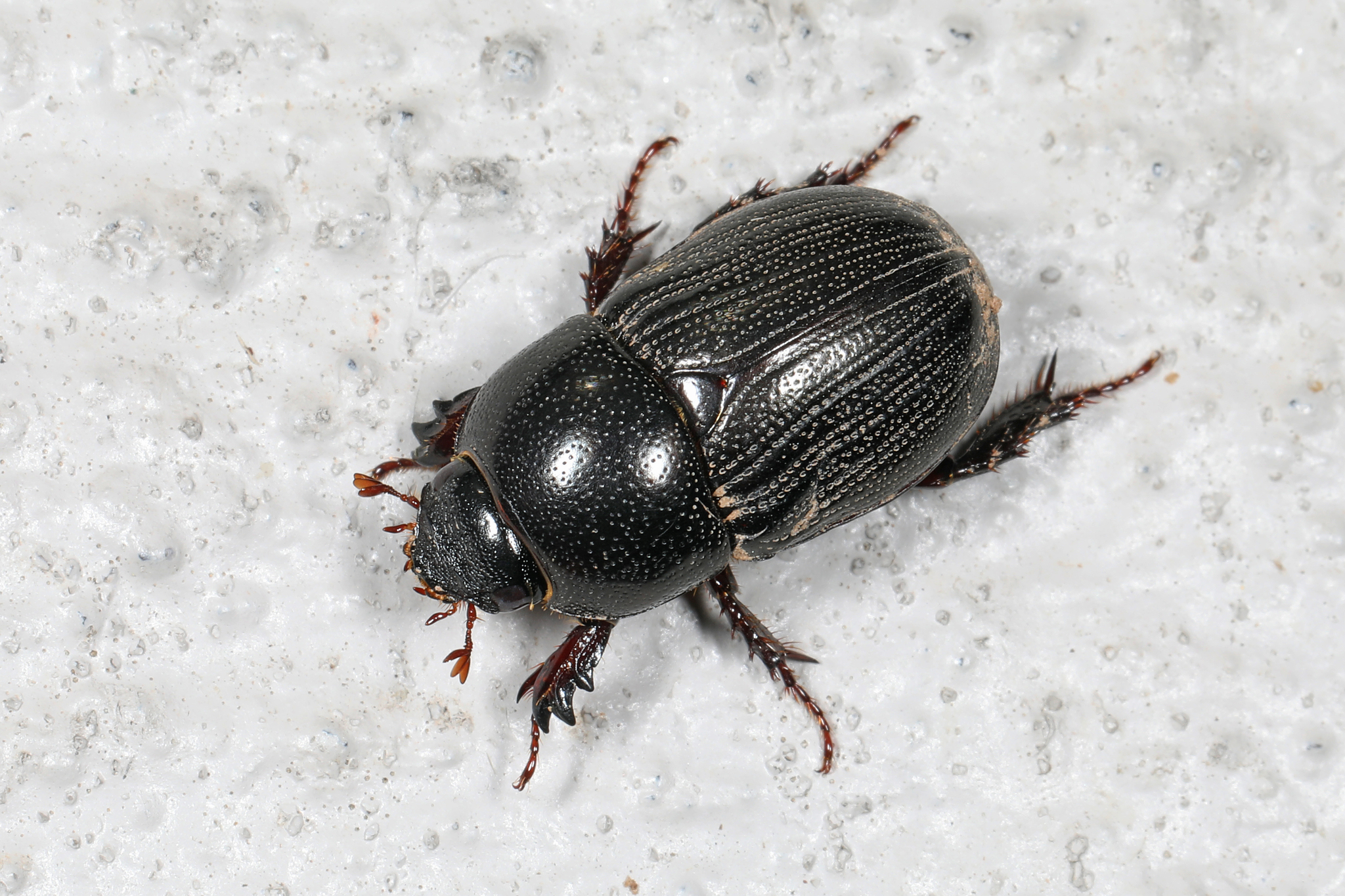
- Euetheola rugiceps, Virginia

Scientific classification
- Kingdom: Animalia
- Phylum: Arthropoda
- Clade: Pancrustacea
- Class: Insecta
- Order: Coleoptera
- Suborder: Polyphaga
- Infraorder: Scarabaeiformia
- Family: Scarabaeidae
- Subfamily: Dynastinae
- Tribe: Pentodontini
- Genus: Euetheola
- Species: E. rugiceps

Binomial name
- Euetheola rugiceps (LeConte, 1856)

Synonyms
- Ligyrus rugiceps LeConte, 1856

= Euetheola rugiceps =

Species of beetles

Euetheola rugiceps is a species of dung beetle in the family Scarabaeidae. It is found in North America.

This species was formerly included in Euetheola humilis, but now individuals from North America are make up the species Euetheola rugiceps while those from Central and South America remain Euetheola humilis.
