= Pentodon =

Pentodon is the scientific name of two genera of organisms and may refer to:

- Pentodon (beetle), a genus of beetles in the family Scarabaeidae
- Pentodon (plant), a genus of plants in the family Rubiaceae
