= P. frontalis =

P. frontalis may refer to:

- Paguristes frontalis, a hermit crab species
- Pericoptus frontalis, a beetle species
- Phoenicurus frontalis, the blue-fronted redstart, a bird species found in Bhutan, China and India
- Photuris frontalis, the synchronous-flashing firefly species in the beetle family Lampyridae
- Pipreola frontalis, the scarlet-breasted fruiteater, a bird species found in Bolivia and Ecuador
- Plebeia frontalis, a stingless bee species in the genus Plebeia
- Pyrrhura frontalis, the reddish-bellied parakeet, a small parrot species found from southeastern Brazil to north-eastern Argentina

== See also ==
- Frontalis (disambiguation)
