= Oxygrylius =

Scientific classification
- Kingdom: Animalia
- Phylum: Arthropoda
- Class: Insecta
- Order: Coleoptera
- Suborder: Polyphaga
- Infraorder: Scarabaeiformia
- Family: Scarabaeidae
- Tribe: Pentodontini
- Genus: Oxygrylius; Casey, 1915

Genus of beetles

Oxygrylius is a genus of rhinoceros beetles in the family Scarabaeidae. There are at least two described species in Oxygrylius.

== Species ==
These two species belong to the genus Oxygrylius:

- Oxygrylius peninsularis Casey, 1915
- Oxygrylius ruginasus (LeConte, 1856)
