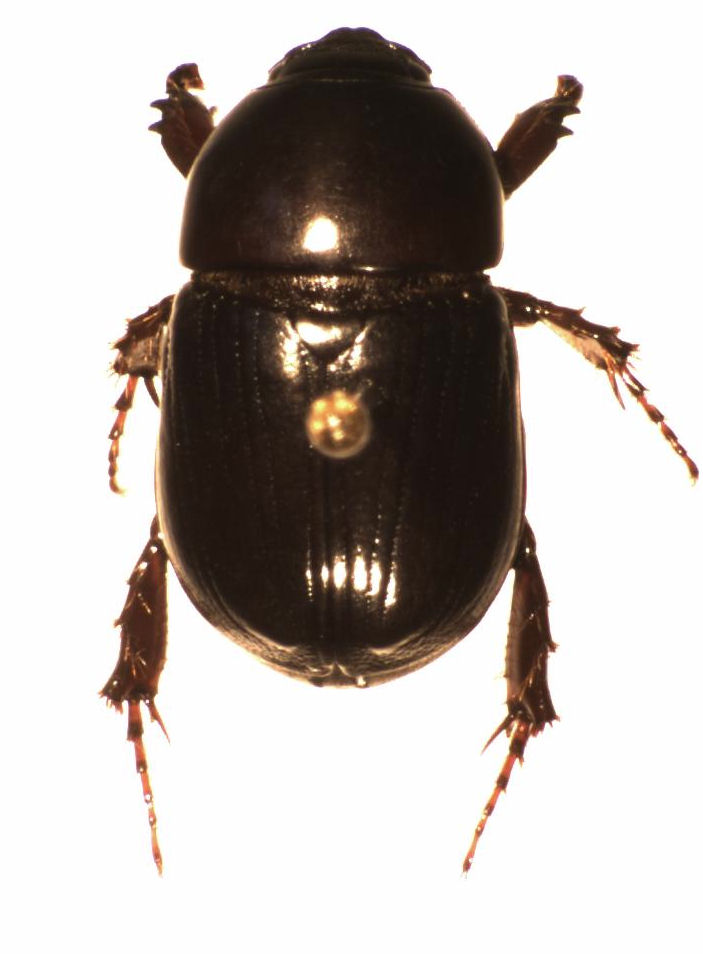
- Heteronychus arator

Scientific classification
- Kingdom: Animalia
- Phylum: Arthropoda
- Class: Insecta
- Order: Coleoptera
- Suborder: Polyphaga
- Infraorder: Scarabaeiformia
- Family: Scarabaeidae
- Tribe: Pentodontini
- Genus: Heteronychus; Dejean, 1833

= Heteronychus =

Genus of beetles

Heteronychus is a genus of beetles belonging to the family Scarabaeidae, subfamily Dynastinae.

The species of this genus are found in Africa, Southeastern Asia and Australia.

Species:

- Heteronychus abyssinicus Jack, 1923
- Heteronychus amplipennis Benderitter, 1915
- Heteronychus amplus Kolbe, 1900
- Heteronychus andersoni Jack, 1923
- Heteronychus annulatus Bates, 1891
- Heteronychus approximans Kolbe, 1900
- Heteronychus arator (Fabricius, 1775)
- Heteronychus ascanius Kolbe, 1900
- Heteronychus atratus Klug, 1855
- Heteronychus basilewskyi Endrödi, 1962
- Heteronychus bituberculatus Kolbe, 1900
- Heteronychus brittoni Ferreira, 1965
- Heteronychus carvalhoi Ferreira, 1970
- Heteronychus citernii Paoli, 1934
- Heteronychus congoensis Kolbe, 1900
- Heteronychus consimilis Kolbe, 1900
- Heteronychus cordatus Endrödi, 1974
- Heteronychus costatus Lansberge, 1886
- Heteronychus cricetus (Hausmann, 1807)
- Heteronychus curtulus Fairmaire, 1887
- Heteronychus desaegeri Burgeon, 1947
- Heteronychus digitiformis Zhang, 1983
- Heteronychus fossor Reiche, 1847
- Heteronychus howdeni Yamaya, 2016
- Heteronychus impudens Jack, 1923
- Heteronychus infans Kolbe, 1897
- Heteronychus inoportunus Ferreira, 1966
- Heteronychus insignificus Jack, 1923
- Heteronychus intermedius Zhang, 1983
- Heteronychus jacki Arrow, 1936
- Heteronychus krombeini Endrödi, 1976
- Heteronychus licas (Klug, 1835)
- Heteronychus lioderes Redtenbacher, 1867
- Heteronychus lusingae Endrödi, 1974
- Heteronychus minimus Dupuis, 2012
- Heteronychus minutus Burmeister, 1847
- Heteronychus mollis Endrödi, 1961
- Heteronychus monodi Paulian, 1954
- Heteronychus mosambicus Péringuey, 1908
- Heteronychus muticus Benderitter, 1915
- Heteronychus paolii Arrow, 1936
- Heteronychus parumpunctatus Burmeister, 1847
- Heteronychus parvus Burmeister, 1847
- Heteronychus pauperatus Péringuey, 1901
- Heteronychus plebejus (Klug, 1832)
- Heteronychus puerilis Kolbe, 1900
- Heteronychus puncticollis Jack, 1923
- Heteronychus punctolineatus Fairmaire, 1893
- Heteronychus pygidialis Kolbe, 1900
- Heteronychus rusticus (Klug, 1832)
- Heteronychus sabackyi Endrödi, 1975
- Heteronychus sacchari Arrow, 1908
- Heteronychus similis Dechambre, 1992
- Heteronychus simulans Jack, 1923
- Heteronychus sublaevis (Fairmaire, 1891)
- Heteronychus tenuestriatus Fairmaire, 1893
- Heteronychus tesari Endrödi, 1968
- Heteronychus tristis Boheman, 1857
- Heteronychus vixstriatus Jack, 1923
- Heteronychus wittei Janssens, 1942
