= Aphonus =

Scientific classification
- Kingdom: Animalia
- Phylum: Arthropoda
- Class: Insecta
- Order: Coleoptera
- Suborder: Polyphaga
- Infraorder: Scarabaeiformia
- Family: Scarabaeidae
- Tribe: Pentodontini
- Genus: Aphonus; LeConte, 1856

Genus of beetles

Aphonus is a genus of North American rhinoceros beetles in the family Scarabaeidae. There are about six described species in Aphonus.

== Species ==
These six species belong to the genus Aphonus:

- Aphonus brevicruris Cartwright, 1944
- Aphonus castaneus (Melsheimer, 1845)
- Aphonus densicauda Casey, 1915
- Aphonus texanus Gill & Howden, 1985
- Aphonus tridentatus (Say, 1823)
- Aphonus variolosus (LeConte, 1847)
