= Aphonus brevicruris =

Scientific classification
- Domain: Eukaryota
- Kingdom: Animalia
- Phylum: Arthropoda
- Class: Insecta
- Order: Coleoptera
- Suborder: Polyphaga
- Infraorder: Scarabaeiformia
- Family: Scarabaeidae
- Genus: Aphonus
- Species: A. brevicruris

Binomial name
- Aphonus brevicruris Cartwright, 1944

Species of beetle

Aphonus brevicruris is a species of rhinoceros beetle in the family Scarabaeidae.
