= Orizabus ligyroides =

Scientific classification
- Domain: Eukaryota
- Kingdom: Animalia
- Phylum: Arthropoda
- Class: Insecta
- Order: Coleoptera
- Suborder: Polyphaga
- Infraorder: Scarabaeiformia
- Family: Scarabaeidae
- Genus: Orizabus
- Species: O. ligyroides

Binomial name
- Orizabus ligyroides Horn, 1885

Species of beetle

Orizabus ligyroides is a species of rhinoceros beetle in the family Scarabaeidae. It is found in North America.
