= Aphonus variolosus =

Scientific classification
- Kingdom: Animalia
- Phylum: Arthropoda
- Class: Insecta
- Order: Coleoptera
- Suborder: Polyphaga
- Infraorder: Scarabaeiformia
- Family: Scarabaeidae
- Genus: Aphonus
- Species: A. variolosus

Binomial name
- Aphonus variolosus (LeConte, 1847)

Synonyms
- Aphonus hydropicus LeConte, 1856; Aphonus ingens Casey, 1924

Species of beetle

Aphonus variolosus is a species of rhinoceros beetle in the family Scarabaeidae.
