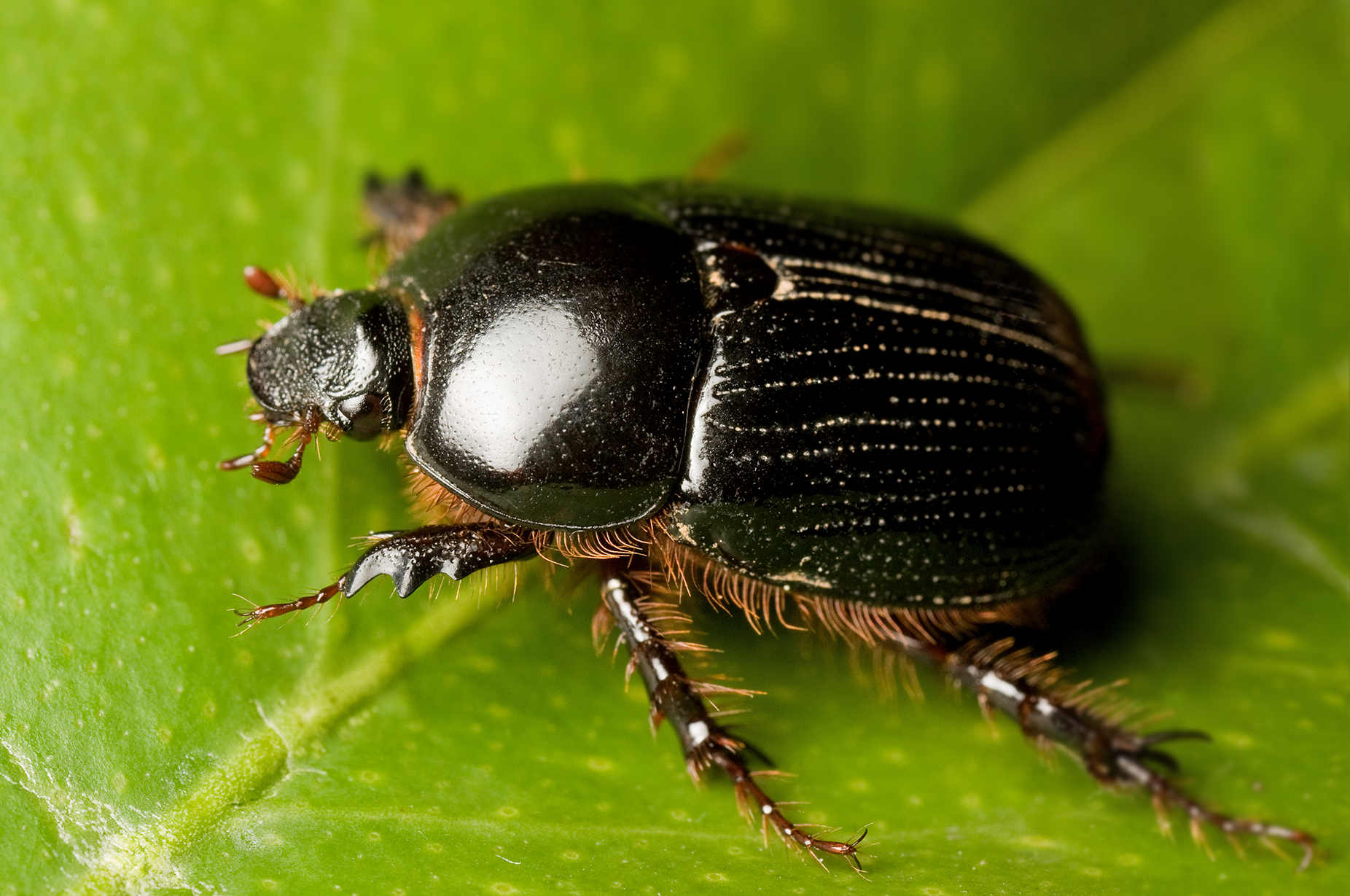
- Adoryphorus coulonii

Scientific classification
- Domain: Eukaryota
- Kingdom: Animalia
- Phylum: Arthropoda
- Class: Insecta
- Order: Coleoptera
- Suborder: Polyphaga
- Infraorder: Scarabaeiformia
- Family: Scarabaeidae
- Subfamily: Dynastinae
- Tribe: Pentodontini
- Genus: Adoryphorus; Blackburn, 1889

= Adoryphorus =

Genus of beetles

Adoryphorus is a genus of beetles belonging to the family Scarabaeidae.

The species of this genus are found in Australia and Malesia.

Species:

- Adoryphorus canei Carne, 1957
- Adoryphorus coulonii (Burmeister, 1847)
- Adoryphorus mellori Carne, 1957
