= Orizabus pyriformis =

Scientific classification
- Kingdom: Animalia
- Phylum: Arthropoda
- Class: Insecta
- Order: Coleoptera
- Suborder: Polyphaga
- Infraorder: Scarabaeiformia
- Family: Scarabaeidae
- Genus: Orizabus
- Species: O. pyriformis

Binomial name
- Orizabus pyriformis (LeConte, 1847)

Synonyms
- Pseudaphonus debiliceps Casey, 1915; Pseudaphonus lucidus Casey, 1915; Pseudaphonus ovalis Casey, 1915; Pseudaphonus puncticollis Casey, 1924; Pseudaphonus repens Casey, 1915

Species of beetle

Orizabus pyriformis is a species of rhinoceros beetle in the family Scarabaeidae. It is found in North America.
