= Oxygrylius ruginasus =

Scientific classification
- Domain: Eukaryota
- Kingdom: Animalia
- Phylum: Arthropoda
- Class: Insecta
- Order: Coleoptera
- Suborder: Polyphaga
- Infraorder: Scarabaeiformia
- Family: Scarabaeidae
- Genus: Oxygrylius
- Species: O. ruginasus

Binomial name
- Oxygrylius ruginasus (LeConte, 1856)

Synonyms
- Oxygrylius pimalis Casey, 1915

Species of beetle

Oxygrylius ruginasus is a species of rhinoceros beetle in the family Scarabaeidae.
