= Aphonus castaneus =

Scientific classification
- Domain: Eukaryota
- Kingdom: Animalia
- Phylum: Arthropoda
- Class: Insecta
- Order: Coleoptera
- Suborder: Polyphaga
- Infraorder: Scarabaeiformia
- Family: Scarabaeidae
- Genus: Aphonus
- Species: A. castaneus

Binomial name
- Aphonus castaneus (Melsheimer, 1845)

Synonyms
- Aphonus cubiformis Casey, 1915; Aphonus saginatus Casey, 1915; Aphonus trapezicollis Casey, 1915; Podalgus obesus Burmeister, 1847

Species of beetle

Aphonus castaneus is a species of rhinoceros beetle in the family Scarabaeidae. It is found in North America.
