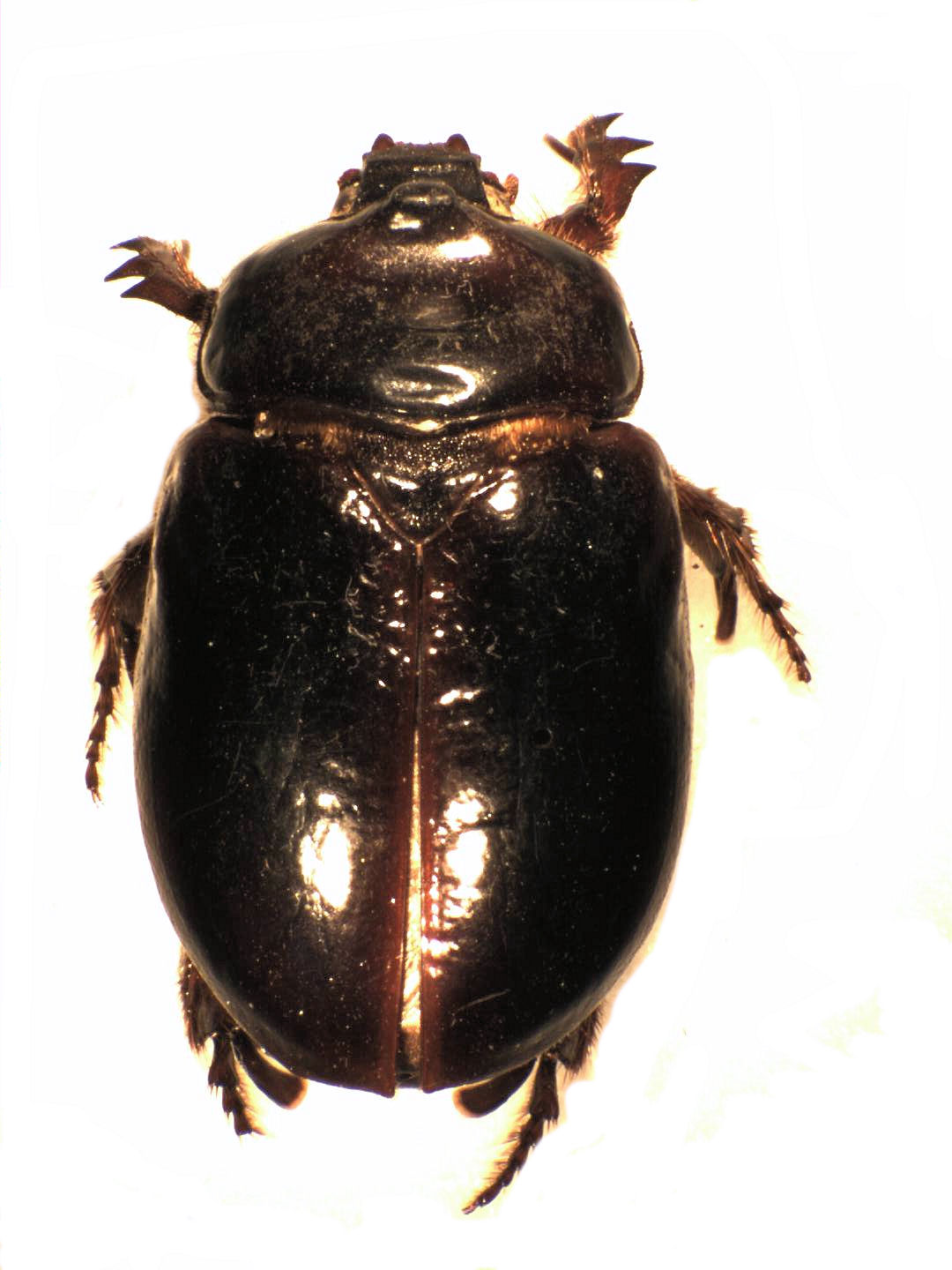

Scientific classification
- Kingdom: Animalia
- Phylum: Arthropoda
- Class: Insecta
- Order: Coleoptera
- Suborder: Polyphaga
- Infraorder: Scarabaeiformia
- Family: Scarabaeidae
- Tribe: Pentodontini
- Genus: Pericoptus; Burmeister, 1847

= Pericoptus =

Genus of beetles

Pericoptus is a genus of large scarab beetles found in New Zealand. As many as five species are recognized.

== Species ==
- Pericoptus frontalis
- Pericoptus nitidulus
- Pericoptus punctatus
- Pericoptus stupidus
- Pericoptus truncatus
