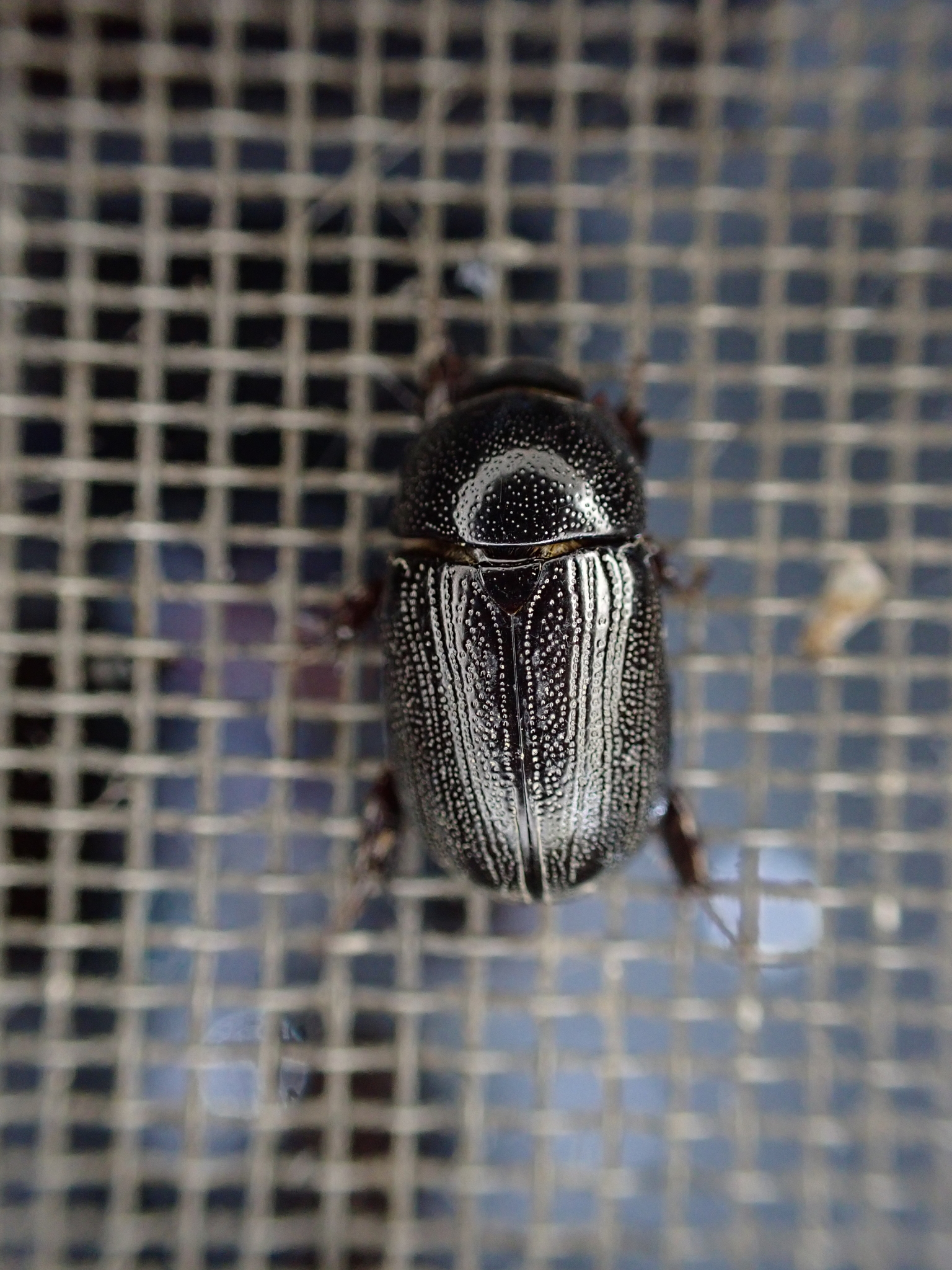
- Euetheola humilis, Bolivia

Scientific classification
- Kingdom: Animalia
- Phylum: Arthropoda
- Clade: Pancrustacea
- Class: Insecta
- Order: Coleoptera
- Suborder: Polyphaga
- Infraorder: Scarabaeiformia
- Family: Scarabaeidae
- Genus: Euetheola
- Species: E. humilis

Binomial name
- Euetheola humilis (Burmeister, 1847)

Synonyms
- Dyscinetus hondurana Casey, 1915; Dyscinetus parvus Casey, 1915; Euetheola hondurana Casey, 1915; Heteronychus humilis Burmeister, 1847

= Euetheola humilis =

Species of beetle

Euetheola humilis, the sugarcane beetle, is a species of rhinoceros beetle in the family Scarabaeidae. It is found in Central and South America.

The North American sugarcane beetle is now a separate species, Euetheola rugiceps.
