= Aphonus texanus =

Scientific classification
- Kingdom: Animalia
- Phylum: Arthropoda
- Clade: Pancrustacea
- Class: Insecta
- Order: Coleoptera
- Suborder: Polyphaga
- Infraorder: Scarabaeiformia
- Family: Scarabaeidae
- Genus: Aphonus
- Species: A. texanus

Binomial name
- Aphonus texanus Gill & Howden, 1985

Species of beetle

Aphonus texanus is a species of rhinoceros beetle in the family Scarabaeidae.
