= Coscinocephalus =

Scientific classification
- Domain: Eukaryota
- Kingdom: Animalia
- Phylum: Arthropoda
- Class: Insecta
- Order: Coleoptera
- Suborder: Polyphaga
- Infraorder: Scarabaeiformia
- Family: Scarabaeidae
- Tribe: Pentodontini
- Genus: Coscinocephalus; Prell, 1936

Genus of beetles

Coscinocephalus is a genus of rhinoceros beetles in the family Scarabaeidae. There are at least two described species in Coscinocephalus.

== Species ==
These two species belong to the genus Coscinocephalus:

- Coscinocephalus cribrifrons (Schaeffer, 1906)
- Coscinocephalus tepehuanus Morón & Ratcliffe, 1996
