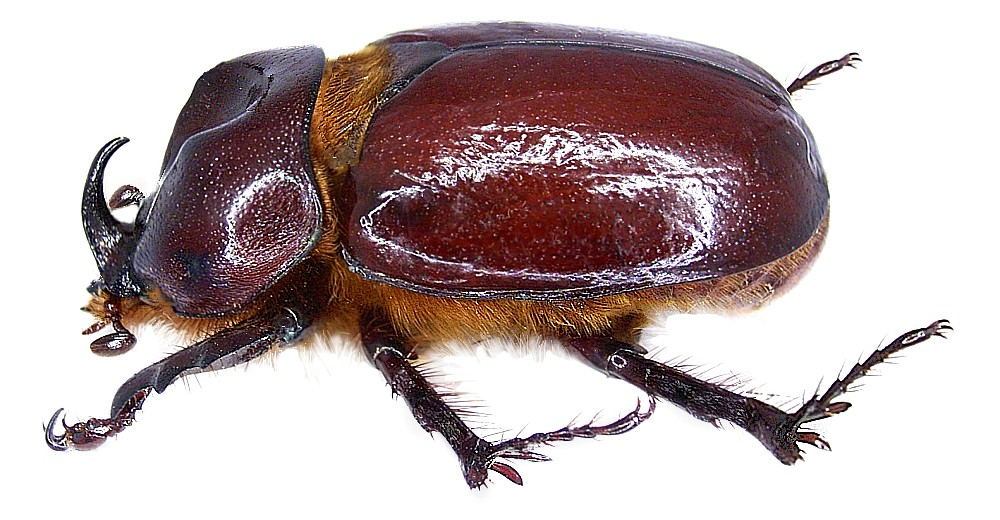
- Phyllognathus excavatus

Scientific classification
- Domain: Eukaryota
- Kingdom: Animalia
- Phylum: Arthropoda
- Class: Insecta
- Order: Coleoptera
- Suborder: Polyphaga
- Infraorder: Scarabaeiformia
- Family: Scarabaeidae
- Subfamily: Dynastinae
- Tribe: Pentodontini
- Genus: Phyllognathus; Eschscholtz, 1830

= Phyllognathus =

Genus of beetles

Phyllognathus is a genus of beetles belonging to the family Scarabaeidae, subfamily Dynastinae.

The species of this genus are found in Southern Europe, Northern Africa.

== Species ==
GBIF and BioLib include:

1. Phyllognathus burmeisteri Arrow, 1911
2. Phyllognathus degener Fairmaire, 1891
3. Phyllognathus dionysius (Fabricius, 1792)
4. Phyllognathus excavatus (Forster, 1771)
5. Phyllognathus orion (Olivier, 1789)
6. Phyllognathus sabatinellii Endrödi, 1979
