= Euetheola subglabra =

Scientific classification
- Domain: Eukaryota
- Kingdom: Animalia
- Phylum: Arthropoda
- Class: Insecta
- Order: Coleoptera
- Suborder: Polyphaga
- Infraorder: Scarabaeiformia
- Family: Scarabaeidae
- Genus: Euetheola
- Species: E. subglabra

Binomial name
- Euetheola subglabra (Schaeffer, 1909)

Species of beetle

Euetheola subglabra is a species of rhinoceros beetle in the family Scarabaeidae.
