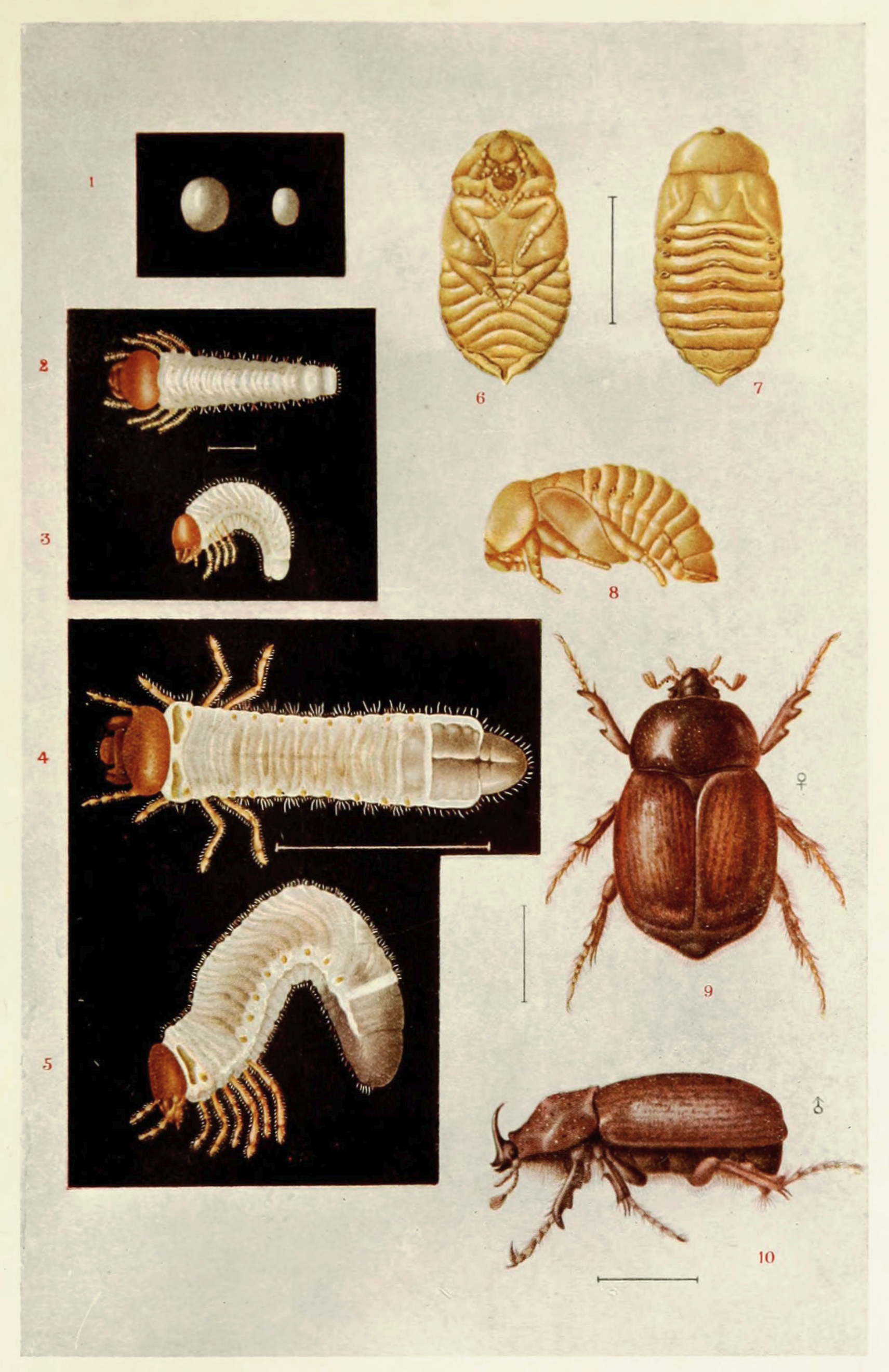

Scientific classification
- Kingdom: Animalia
- Phylum: Arthropoda
- Class: Insecta
- Order: Coleoptera
- Suborder: Polyphaga
- Infraorder: Scarabaeiformia
- Family: Scarabaeidae
- Genus: Phyllognathus
- Species: P. dionysius

Binomial name
- Phyllognathus dionysius (Fabricius, 1792)

Synonyms
- Scarabaeus dionysius Fabricius, 1792; Phyllognathus dionysius Arrow, 1910; Phyllognathus howarthi Hope, 1831; Xylotrupes reductus Walker, 1859; Oryctes haworthi Hope, 1831

= Phyllognathus dionysius =

Species of beetle

Phyllognathus dionysius, is a species of dung beetle found in India, Sri Lanka, Pakistan and Nepal.

== Description ==
Male is about 16.0 to 23.0 mm in length. Body short, compact, globose and convex. Body shiny red brown in color. Margins of head, clypeus, pronotum, scutellum and elytra are totally black. Underside consists with long tawny hairs. Head rugo-punctate with an acute horn. Clypeus rugose, and bluntly pointed. Antenna with 10 segments. Pronotum minutely and densely punctured. Scutellum minutely punctured, and obtusely triangular. Elytra coarsely punctate-striate with puncturations. Pygidium minutely punctured. In female, head armed with a sharp and small tubercle. Pronotum coarsely punctured and pygidium covered with erect hairs.

It is known as a minor pest on peanut, capsicum and tomato.
