= Euetheola =

Scientific classification
- Kingdom: Animalia
- Phylum: Arthropoda
- Clade: Pancrustacea
- Class: Insecta
- Order: Coleoptera
- Suborder: Polyphaga
- Infraorder: Scarabaeiformia
- Family: Scarabaeidae
- Tribe: Pentodontini
- Genus: Euetheola; Bates, 1888

Genus of beetles

Euetheola is a genus of rhinoceros beetles in the family Scarabaeidae. There are about eight described species in Euetheola.

== Species ==
These species belong to the genus Euetheola:

- Euetheola bidentata (Burmeister, 1847)
- Euetheola hippocrepis Prokofiev, 2012
- Euetheola humilis (Burmeister, 1847) (sugarcane beetle, Central and South America)
- Euetheola latipennis Arrow, 1911
- Euetheola paraguayensis Prokofiev, 2014
- Euetheola rugiceps (LeConte, 1856) (sugarcane beetle, North America)
- Euetheola sibericana Prokofiev, 2012
- Euetheola subglabra (Schaeffer, 1909)
