= Coscinocephalus cribrifrons =

Scientific classification
- Domain: Eukaryota
- Kingdom: Animalia
- Phylum: Arthropoda
- Class: Insecta
- Order: Coleoptera
- Suborder: Polyphaga
- Infraorder: Scarabaeiformia
- Family: Scarabaeidae
- Genus: Coscinocephalus
- Species: C. cribrifrons

Binomial name
- Coscinocephalus cribrifrons (Schaeffer, 1906)

Species of beetle

Coscinocephalus cribrifrons is a species of rhinoceros beetle in the family Scarabaeidae.
