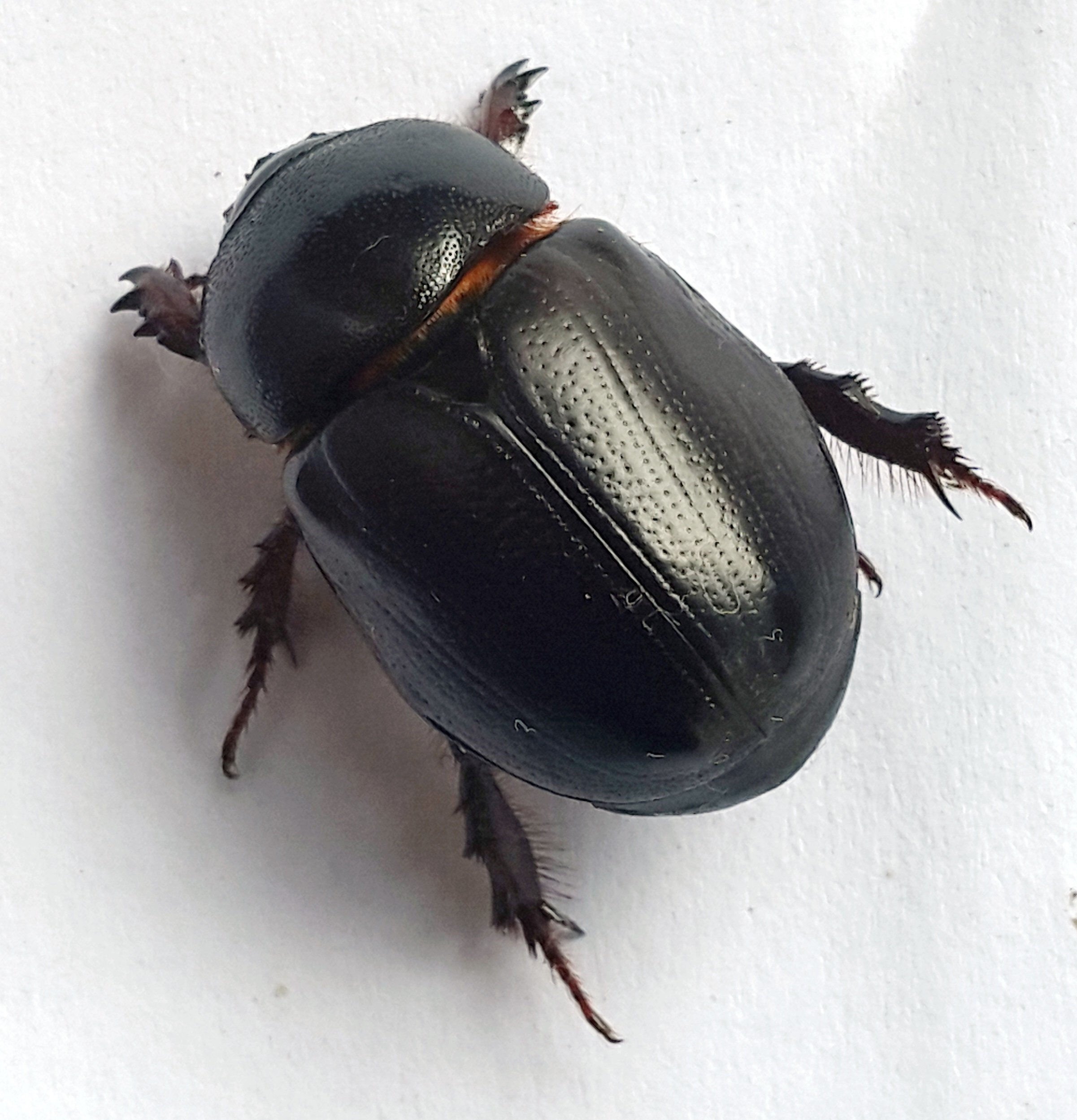

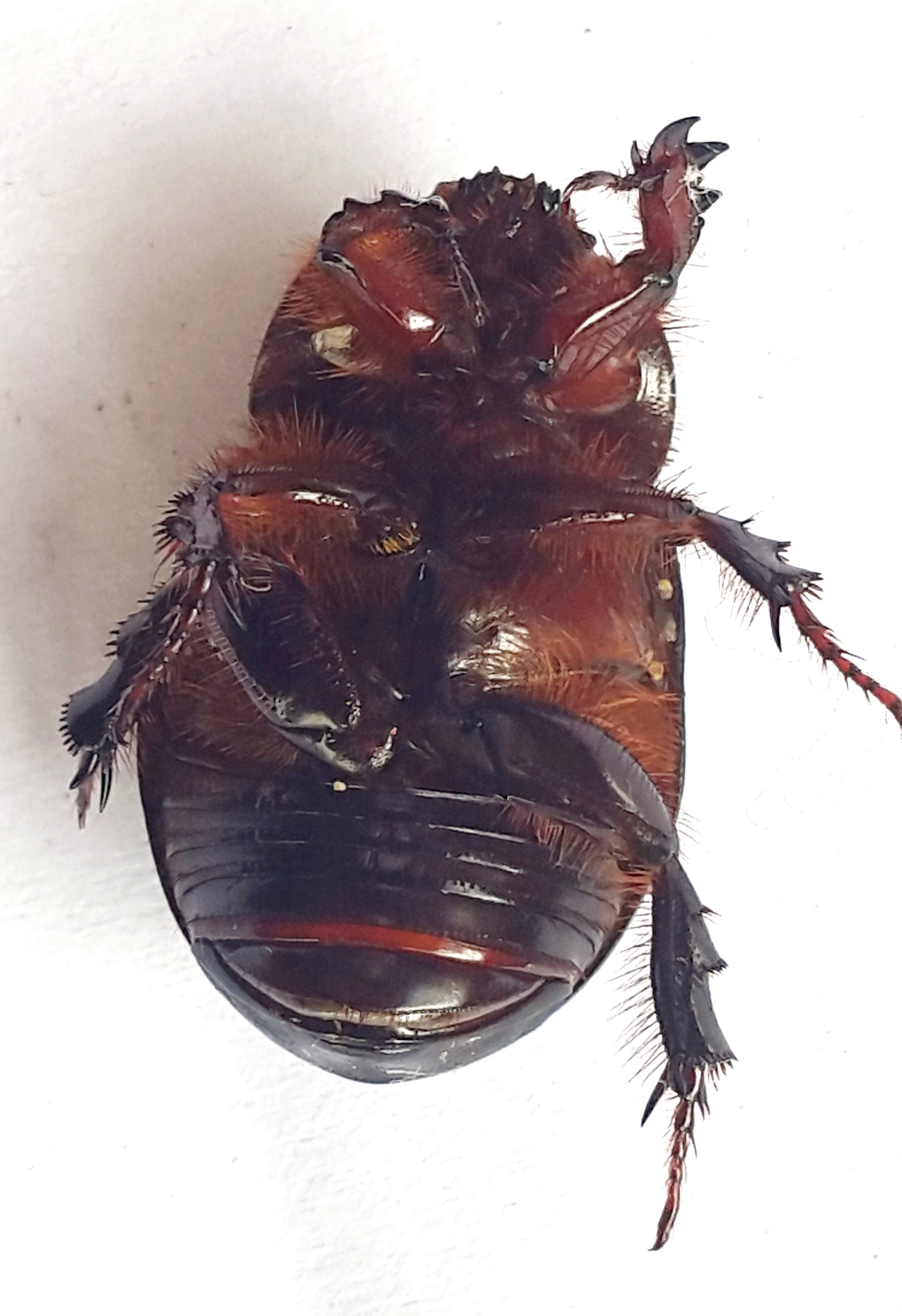

Scientific classification
- Kingdom: Animalia
- Phylum: Arthropoda
- Class: Insecta
- Order: Coleoptera
- Suborder: Polyphaga
- Infraorder: Scarabaeiformia
- Family: Scarabaeidae
- Genus: Heteronychus
- Species: H. arator

Binomial name
- Heteronychus arator (Fabricius, 1775)

= Heteronychus arator =

Species of beetle

Heteronychus arator (hetero+onychus = 'variable claw', arator = 'ploughman') is a species of beetle in the subfamily Dynastinae (the rhinoceros beetles). It is commonly called African black beetle or black lawn beetle. It is native to Africa and it is an introduced species in Australia, Norfolk Island and the North Island of New Zealand.

== Morphology ==
It is a shiny black (or dark reddish brown) oval-shaped beetle 12-15 millimeters long. The head lacks a carina or tubercles, unlike some other scarabs. The clypeus is truncate with distinct lateral margins, and dentate with a denticle in the middle. Each mandible has 2-3 teeth on the outer edge and is visible when looking at the beetle from above. Each antenna is 10-segmented and ends in a 3-segmented club. On the underside of the head is a mentum with a rounded apex. Each eye is partially split by a glabrous (smooth) ocular canthus. The pronotum is smooth, convex and lacks punctures. The elytra have rows of shallow striae. The propygidium (dorsal plate of the second-last abdominal segment) has a pair of stridulatory bands. The hind legs have tibiae with truncate apices. All legs end in simple tarsal claws.

== Diet ==
Adults feed on stems of plants at or just below ground level, while larvae feed on organic matter and roots in soil. This species may damage lawns and other turf, especially during the summer, as well as many crop plants, garden flowers, trees and shrubs. It prefers some plants over others: larvae gain more weight when feeding on ryegrass than on white clover or lotus.

== Diseases ==
This species is infected by a small RNA virus. This virus develops in the cytoplasm of gut and fat body cells. It can also infect larvae of greater wax moth (Galleria mellonella) and some other insects, but cannot infect mice.
