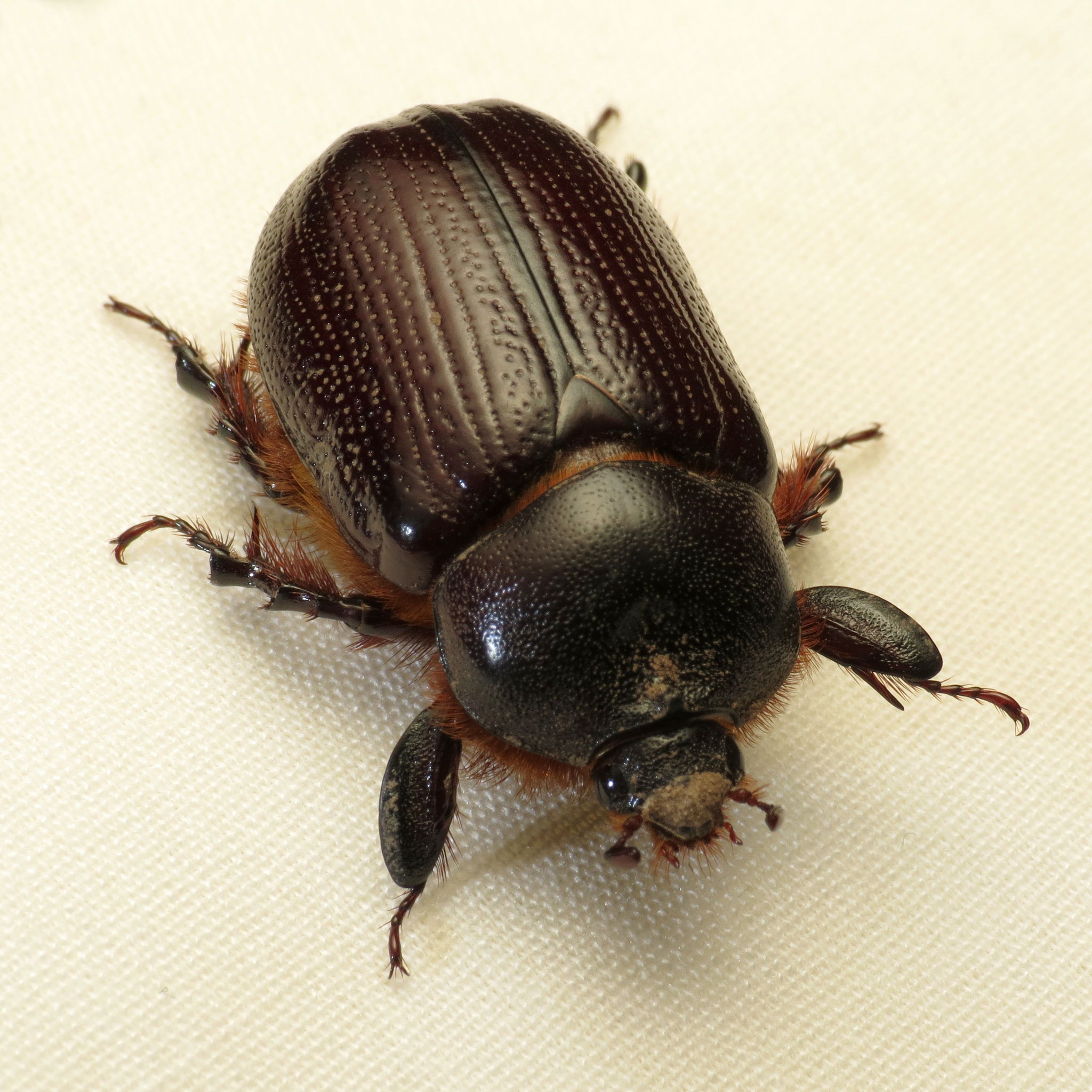
- Orizabus clunalis

Scientific classification
- Kingdom: Animalia
- Phylum: Arthropoda
- Class: Insecta
- Order: Coleoptera
- Suborder: Polyphaga
- Infraorder: Scarabaeiformia
- Family: Scarabaeidae
- Tribe: Pentodontini
- Genus: Orizabus; Fairmaire, 1878

Synonyms
- Aztecalius Casey, 1915; Pseudaphonus Casey, 1915

= Orizabus =

Genus of beetles

Orizabus is a genus of rhinoceros beetles in the family Scarabaeidae. There are about 10 described species in the genus Orizabus.

== Species ==
- Orizabus batesi Prell, 1914
- Orizabus brevicollis Prell, 1914
- Orizabus clunalis (LeConte, 1856)
- Orizabus isodonoides Fairmaire, 1878
- Orizabus ligyroides Horn, 1885
- Orizabus mcclevei Warner, 2011
- Orizabus pinalicus Warner, 2011
- Orizabus pyriformis (LeConte, 1847)
- Orizabus ratcliffei Delgado, 2008
- Orizabus rubricollis Prell, 1914
