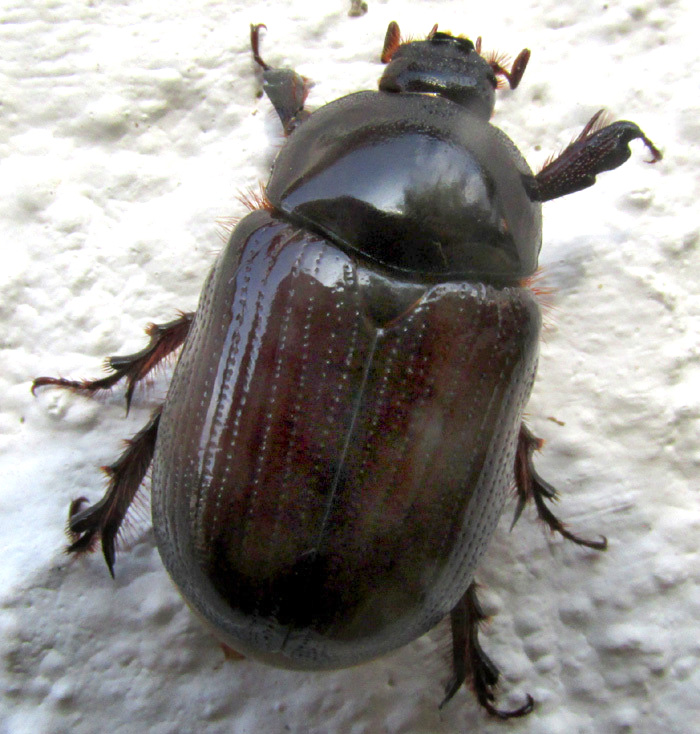

Scientific classification
- Kingdom: Animalia
- Phylum: Arthropoda
- Clade: Pancrustacea
- Class: Insecta
- Order: Coleoptera
- Suborder: Polyphaga
- Infraorder: Scarabaeiformia
- Family: Scarabaeidae
- Genus: Orizabus
- Species: O. isodonoides

Binomial name
- Orizabus isodonoides Fairmaire, 1878

Synonyms
- Cheiropiatys isodonoides Bates 1888; Orizabus (Aztecalius) isodonoides Casey 1915

= Orizabus isodonoides =

Species of beetle

Orizabus isodonoides is a species of beetle occurring in Mexico.

== Description ==
It may be useful to consult a beetle anatomy chart when considering the following technical features distinguishing Orizabus isodonoides from other Orizabus species in the USA (not including Mexican species):

- It has a distinct, transverse fronto-clypeal carina (instead of a tubercle)
- The male's protibiae exhibit unishaped or bisinuate dorsal margins (tibiae with two or three weak lobes)
- The pronotum has a distinctive shape
- Antenna lamellae are relativelly broader, and subovate (in apical view)
- In medium and large males, there's a noticeable anteromedial pronotal tubercle which is separate from the anterior marginal bead and the paramera
- The anterior marginal bead is not angularly wider at the middle
- In males and some females a broad depression usually is evident behind the pronotal tubercle

== Range ==
A 2008 study by Leonardo Delgado stated that Orizabus isodonoides was known in the Mexican states of Chihuahua, Durango, México, Hidalgo, Jalisco, Morelos, Oaxaca, and Puebla. In July 2025 the iNaturalist website documented research-grade observations of Orizabus isodonoides only in the Mexican states of Querétaro, Tlaxcala and México. A 2010 study described the distribution as central, western and northwestern Mexico.

== Habitat ==
Orizabus isodonoides appears to be a highland species. An observation from the state of Chihuahua describes it as occurring in an oak-pine forest at an elevation of 1700m (~5600 ft). The individual featured on this page was found on the exterior wall of a residence in the state of Querétaro at ~ 1880m (~6170 ft).

== More pictures ==
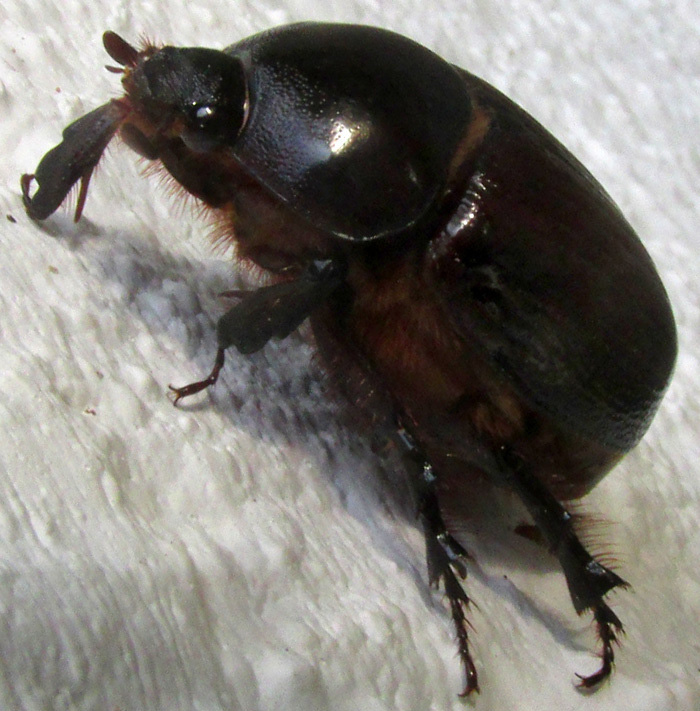

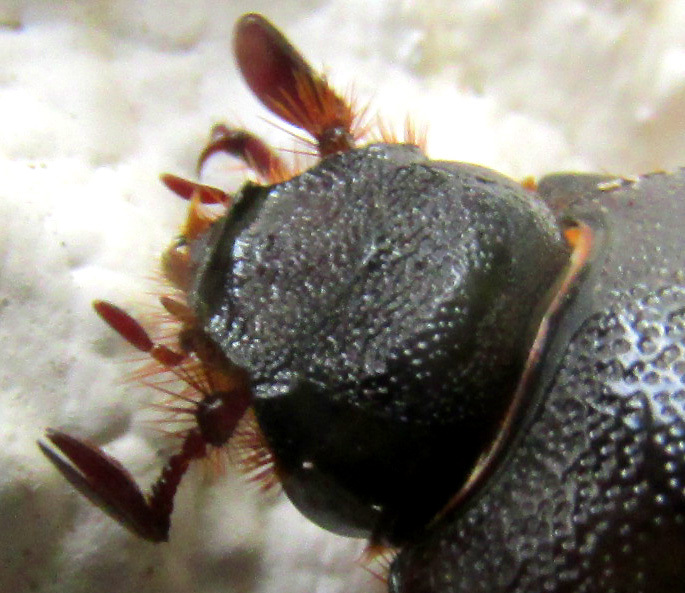
