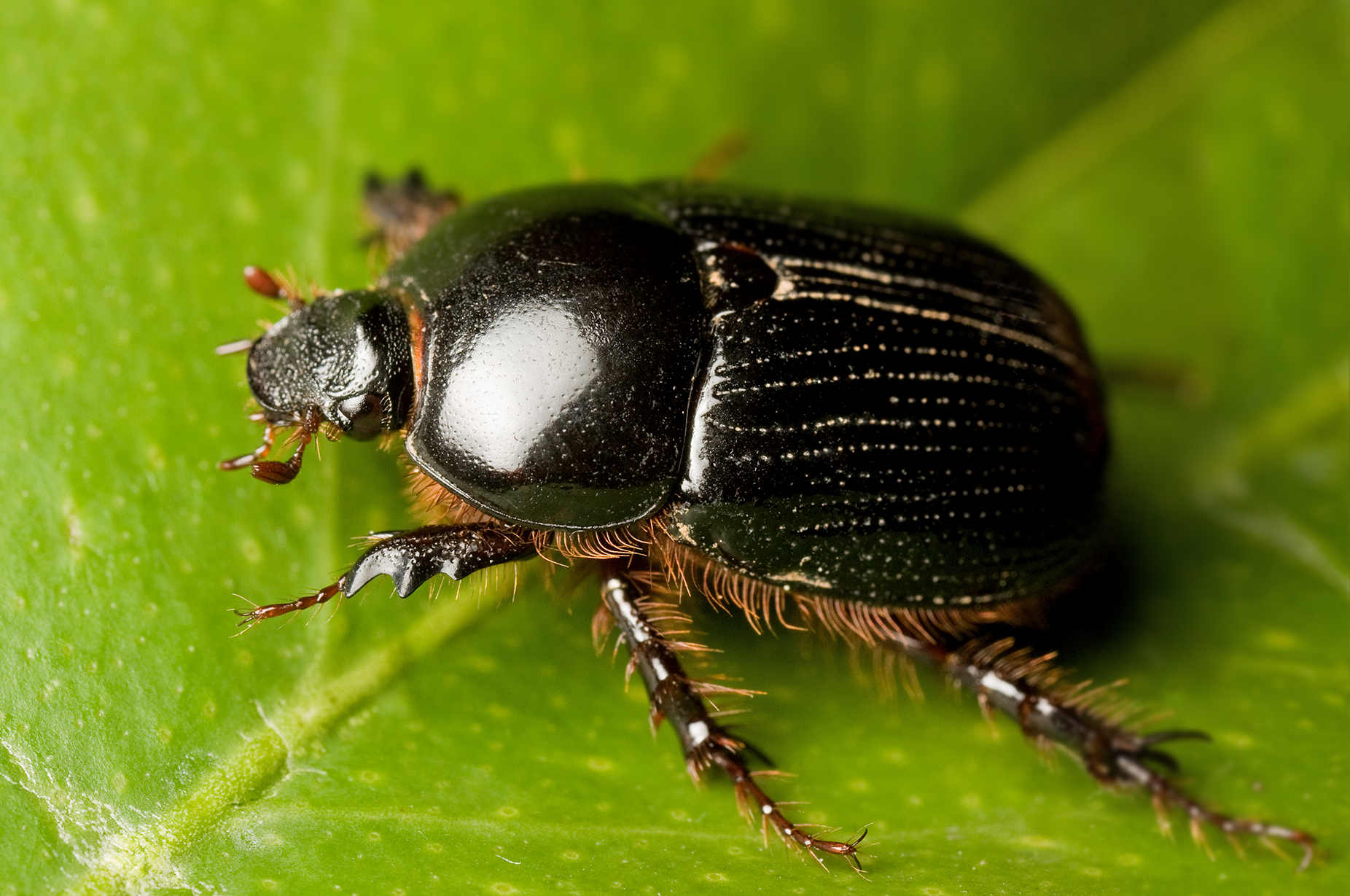
- Red-headed cockchafer, Austins Ferry, Tasmania, Australia

Scientific classification
- Kingdom: Animalia
- Phylum: Arthropoda
- Class: Insecta
- Order: Coleoptera
- Suborder: Polyphaga
- Infraorder: Scarabaeiformia
- Family: Scarabaeidae
- Genus: Adoryphorus
- Species: A. coulonii

Binomial name
- Adoryphorus coulonii (Burmeister, 1847)

= Red-headed cockchafer =

Species of beetle

The red-headed cockchafer or red-headed pasture cockchafer (Adoryphorus couloni or Adoryphorus coulonii) is a species of Australian scarab beetle in the genus Adoryphorus. It is a pasture pest in Victoria, New South Wales, South Australia and Tasmania. It has become naturalised in Canterbury, New Zealand, where it was first recorded in 1963.

== Description ==
The adult beetle is 10–15mm long, 8mm wide, and shiny reddish-brown to black. The larva is white-grey in the early stage. Older larva have yellowish legs and a hard red-brown head, and then become white when mature.
