= Orizabus clunalis =

Scientific classification
- Domain: Eukaryota
- Kingdom: Animalia
- Phylum: Arthropoda
- Class: Insecta
- Order: Coleoptera
- Suborder: Polyphaga
- Infraorder: Scarabaeiformia
- Family: Scarabaeidae
- Genus: Orizabus
- Species: O. clunalis

Binomial name
- Orizabus clunalis (LeConte, 1856)

Synonyms
- Orizabus cultripes Fairmaire, 1878; Orizabus fontinalis Casey, 1915; Orizabus ligyrodes Horn, 1885; Orizabus marginatus Fairmaire, 1878; Orizabus parvitarsis Casey, 1915; Orizabus ponderosus Casey, 1915; Orizabus sallei Fairmaire, 1878; Orizabus snowi Horn, 1885; Orizabus verticalis Fall, 1905

Species of beetle

Orizabus clunalis is a species of rhinoceros beetle in the family Scarabaeidae. It is found in North America.
