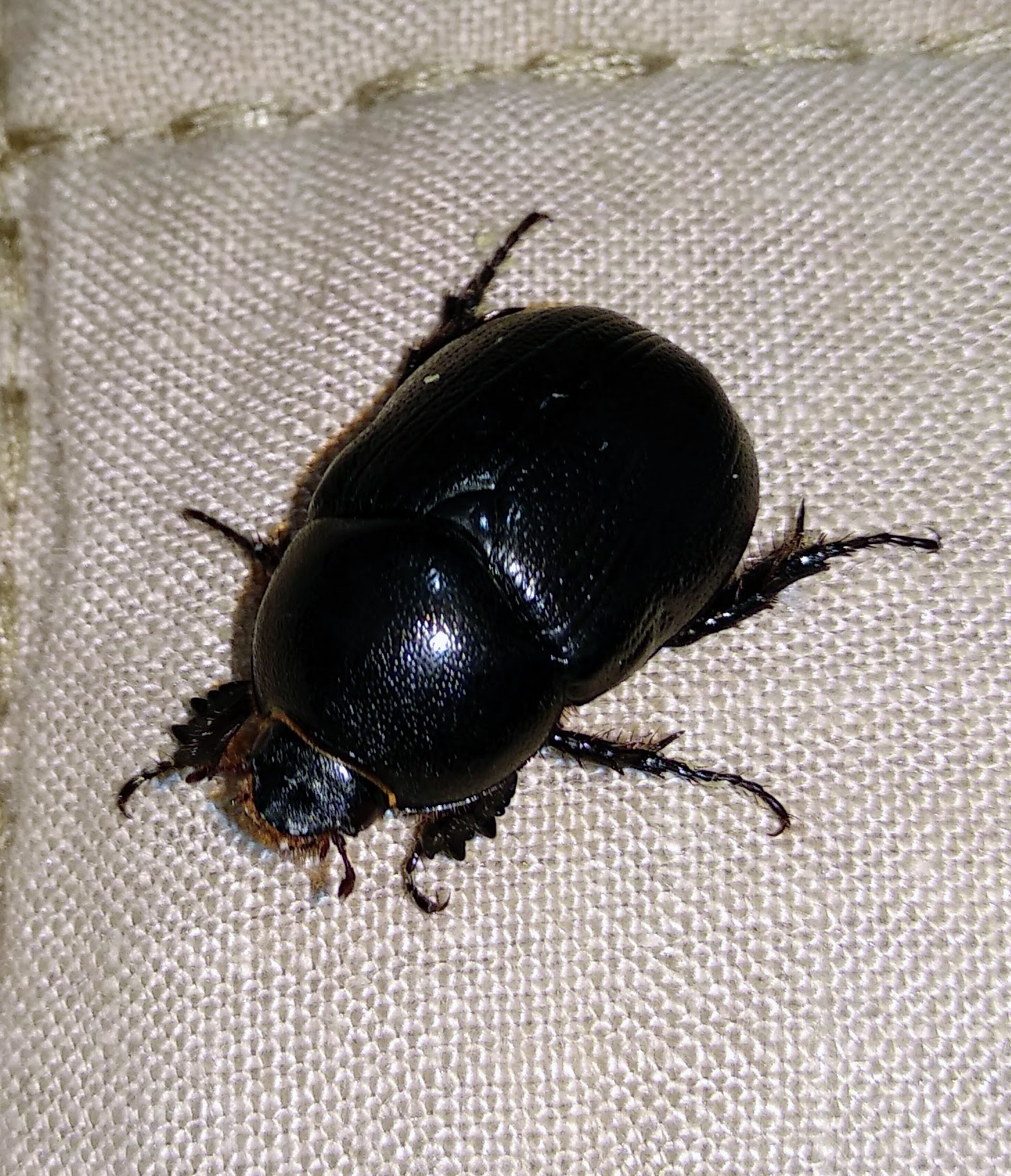
- Pentodon bidens punctatus

Scientific classification
- Kingdom: Animalia
- Phylum: Arthropoda
- Clade: Pancrustacea
- Class: Insecta
- Order: Coleoptera
- Suborder: Polyphaga
- Infraorder: Scarabaeiformia
- Family: Scarabaeidae
- Tribe: Pentodontini
- Genus: Pentodon; Hope, 1837

= Pentodon (beetle) =

Genus of beetles

Pentodon is a genus of Palaearctic beetles belonging to the subfamily Dynastinae, it is the type genus of tribe Pentodontini.

== Species ==
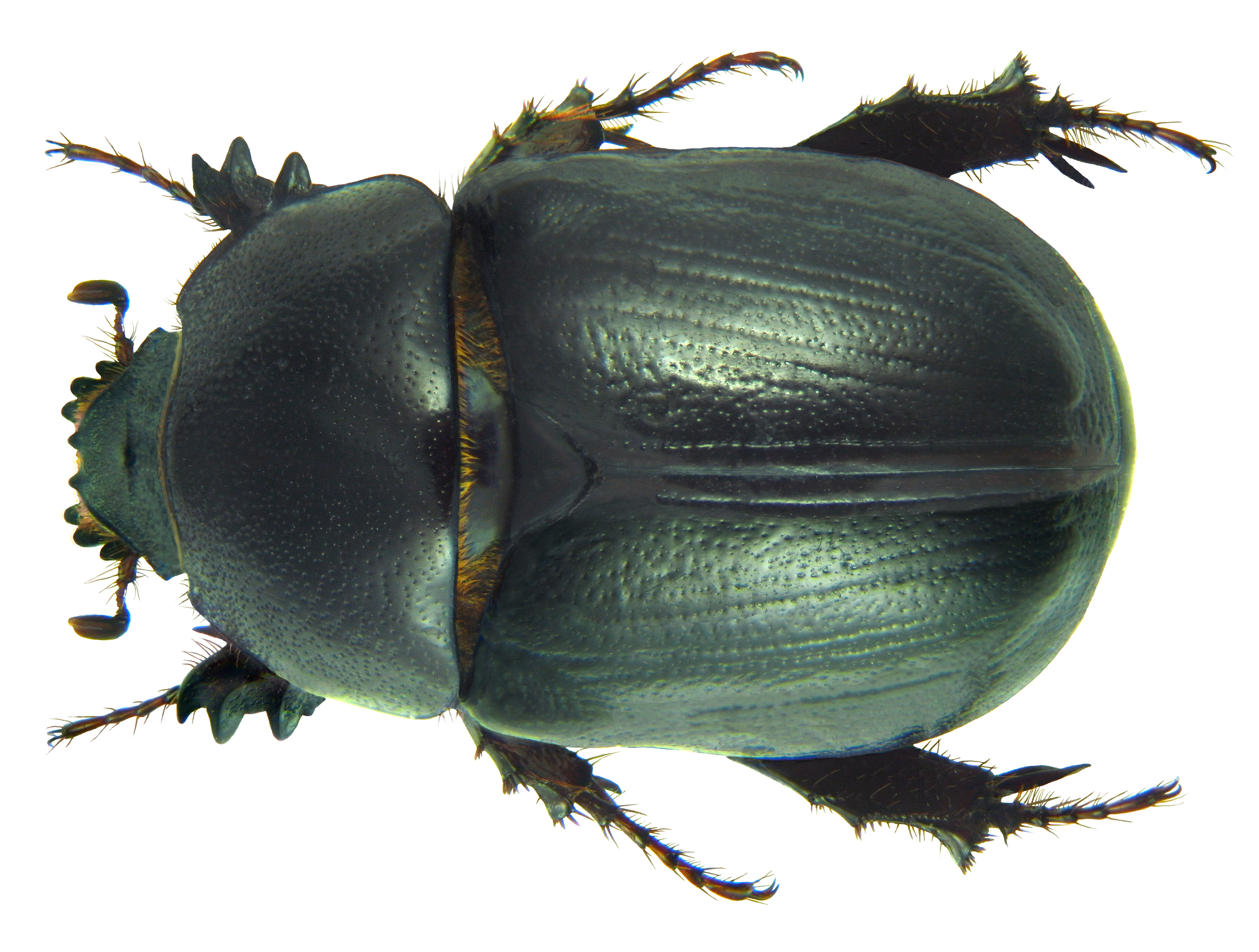
Pentodon algerinum

BioLib includes:

1. Pentodon algerinus (Füssli, 1778)
2. Pentodon bengalensis Arrow, 1910
3. Pentodon bidens (Pallas, 1771) - type species (as Scarabaeus punctatus Villers, 1789
  = P. bidens punctatus)
4. Pentodon brachypterus Gusakov, 2004
5. Pentodon caminarius (Faldermann, 1835)
6. Pentodon foveipennis Jakovlev, 1903
7. Pentodon idiota (Herbst, 1789)
8. Pentodon insularis Zhang, 1991
9. Pentodon intermedius Voirin, 1997
10. Pentodon kuwaitensis Endrödi & Al-Houty, 1985
11. Pentodon minutus Reitter, 1887
12. Pentodon quadridens (Gebler, 1844)
13. Pentodon reitteri Jakovlev, 1904
14. Pentodon snegovayae Shokhin, 2015
15. Pentodon topali Endrödi, 1974
16. Pentodon variolopunctatus Fairmaire, 1879
