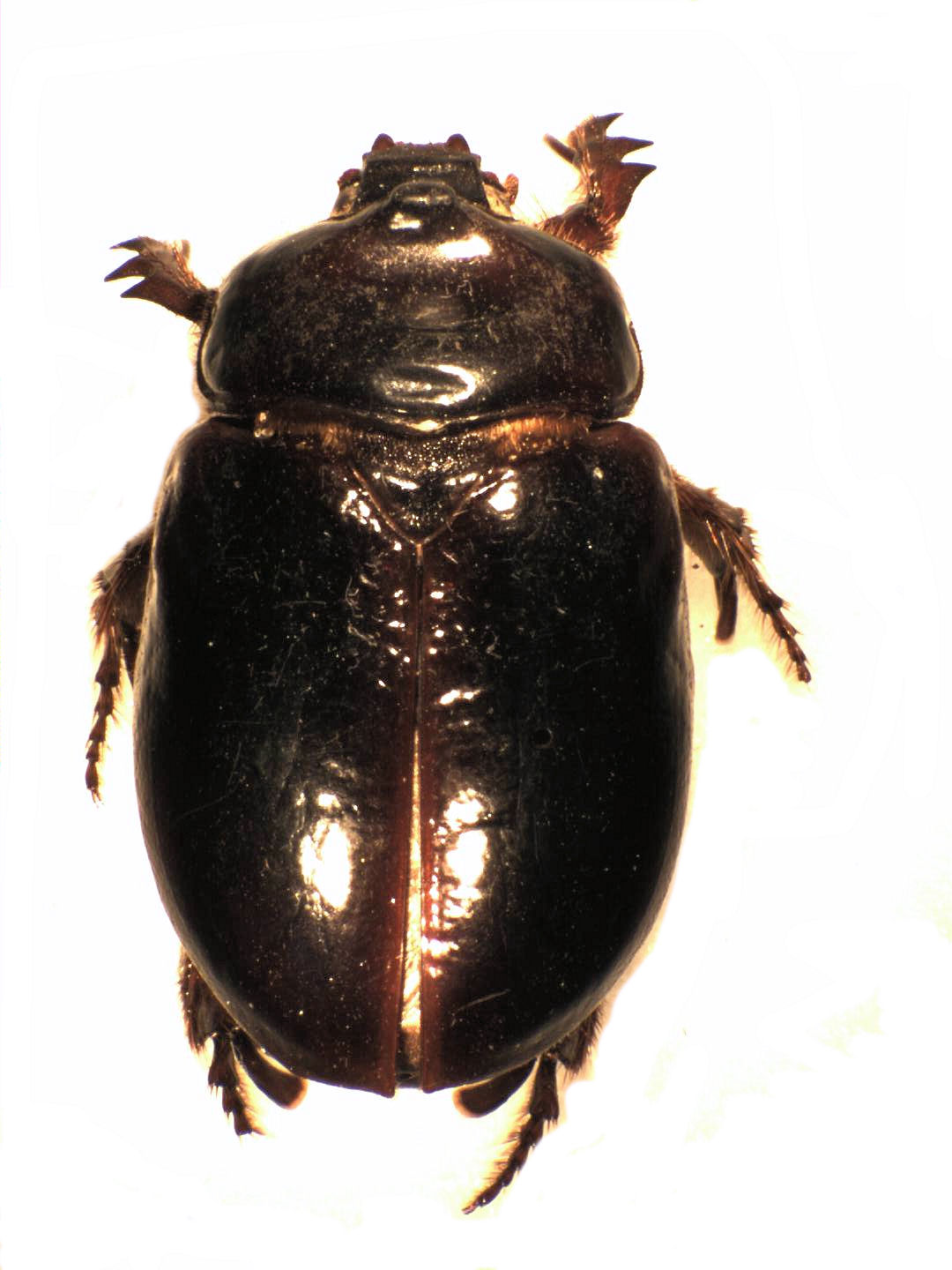
- Male Pericoptus truncatus, dorsal view

Scientific classification
- Domain: Eukaryota
- Kingdom: Animalia
- Phylum: Arthropoda
- Class: Insecta
- Order: Coleoptera
- Suborder: Polyphaga
- Infraorder: Scarabaeiformia
- Family: Scarabaeidae
- Genus: Pericoptus
- Species: P. truncatus

Binomial name
- Pericoptus truncatus (Fabricius, 1775)

Synonyms
- Scarabaeus truncatus Fabricius, 1775

= Pericoptus truncatus =

Species of beetle

Pericoptus truncatus is a large sand scarab beetle. It is native to New Zealand and is found on beaches throughout New Zealand. Its Māori name is ngungutawa.

The adult spends the daylight hours buried in the sand, emerging at night to fly noisily around in search of mates and food. It leaves obvious trails in the sand when walking around. The female lays eggs deep in the sand and the large white grubs can often be found under driftwood, though they feed on roots of dune plants.

== Description ==
Thomas Broun described the species as follows:

Brownish-black, moderately shining, legs and antennae ferruginous, the upper surface and the pygidium are nude, the lower is castaneous, varying in hue, the sternum is densely covered with long yellowish hairs, and the sides of the abdomen with shorter ones. The head is small, flattened in front of the eyes, and this flat portion usually bears a shallow rugose sculpture, the hind portion being almost smooth. The prothorax is much broader than long, with obtusely rounded angles, its apex sinuated behind each eye, and its base widely bisinuated and slightly lobed in the middle, the sides are rounded and narrowed towards the front; the frontal tubercle is large and flattened above, the sometimes-wrinkled depression immediately behind it occupies a considerable portion of the surface, there is a much smaller transversal depression in front of the scutellum, the rest of the surface is without well-defined impressions of any kind. Scutellum large, curvilinearly triangular, rugosely punctate at the base. Elytra wider than thorax, truncated behind, indistinctly hollowed along the suture, sometimes with ill-defined longitudinal lines, and more or less coarsely, but not deeply, punctured near the sides. The pygidium is nearly smooth on the middle, but rugosely punctate laterally. The sternum is rather finely and densely, the abdomen, especially near the sides, more distantly and coarsely punctured. The front tibia are nearly smooth along the middle but coarsely punctate near the sides; the intermediate bear only a few large punctiform impressions, and the apex and costae are ciliated with coarse spines; the posterior are indistinctly bicarinated and very coarsely, densely, and rugosely sculptured.

== Distribution and habitat ==
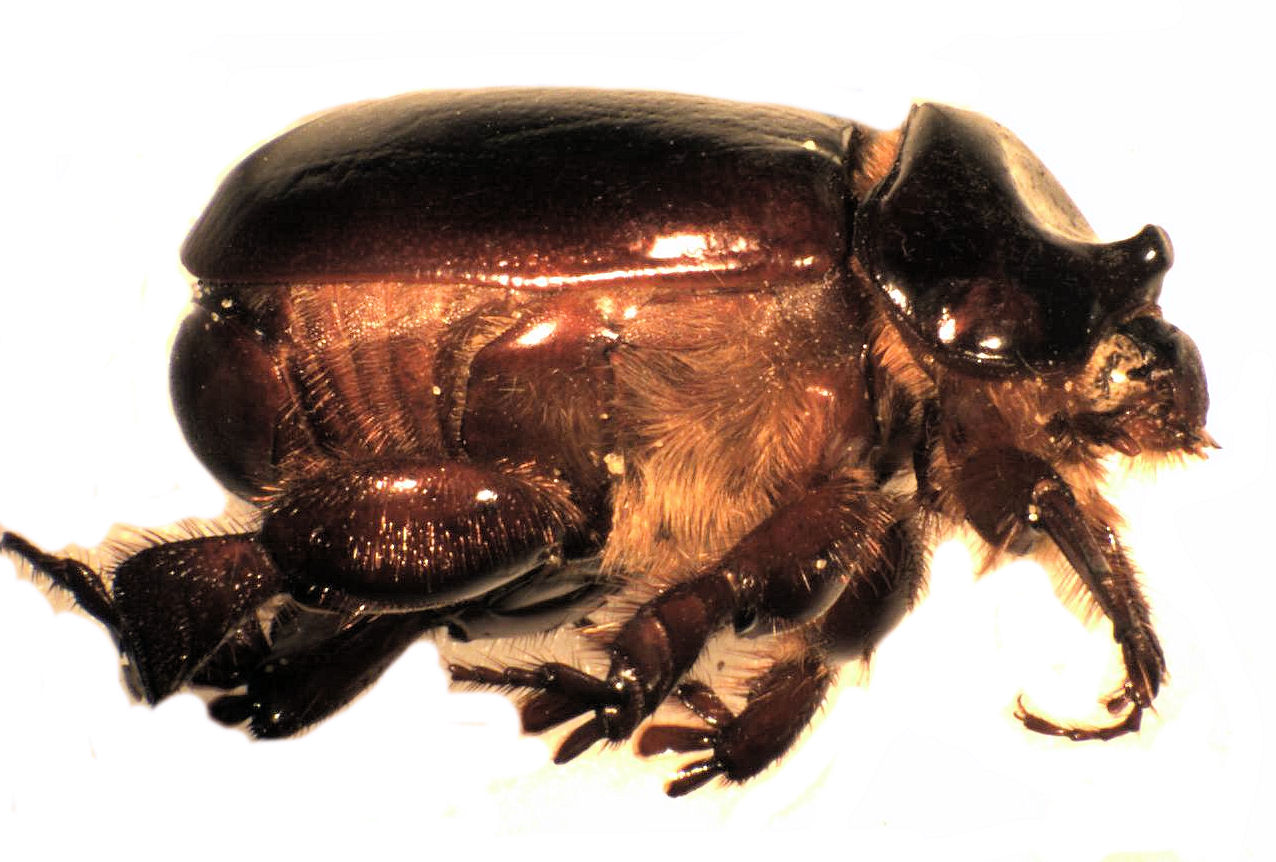
Male Pericoptus truncatus lateral view

Pericoptus truncatus lives in sandy shore areas where driftwood is present, from Ninety Mile beach to Surat Bay, near Bluff. The beetle and its larvae inhabit the area extending from above the high tide mark and including the dunes fronting the beach. They do not seem to occur in dunes found further inland. Although at least one species of Pericoptus has been recorded from sandy bars of West Otago rivers.

The larvae, pupae and adults are common amongst the roots of marram grass and under or within driftwood. The beetles can be found to be living up to 1.2 m (3 ft 11 in) below ground.

Occasionally P. truncatus has been known to emerge in significant numbers at beaches in New Zealand, such as in Waikanae in 1982.

== Ecology ==
Pericoptus truncatus larvae have an unknown association with the Mumulaelaps ammochostos mite, which are found living on the outside of the larvae. The association is unlikely to be parasitic and it has been suggested that the mites may actually feed on other mites and nematodes associated with the larvae.

== Threats ==
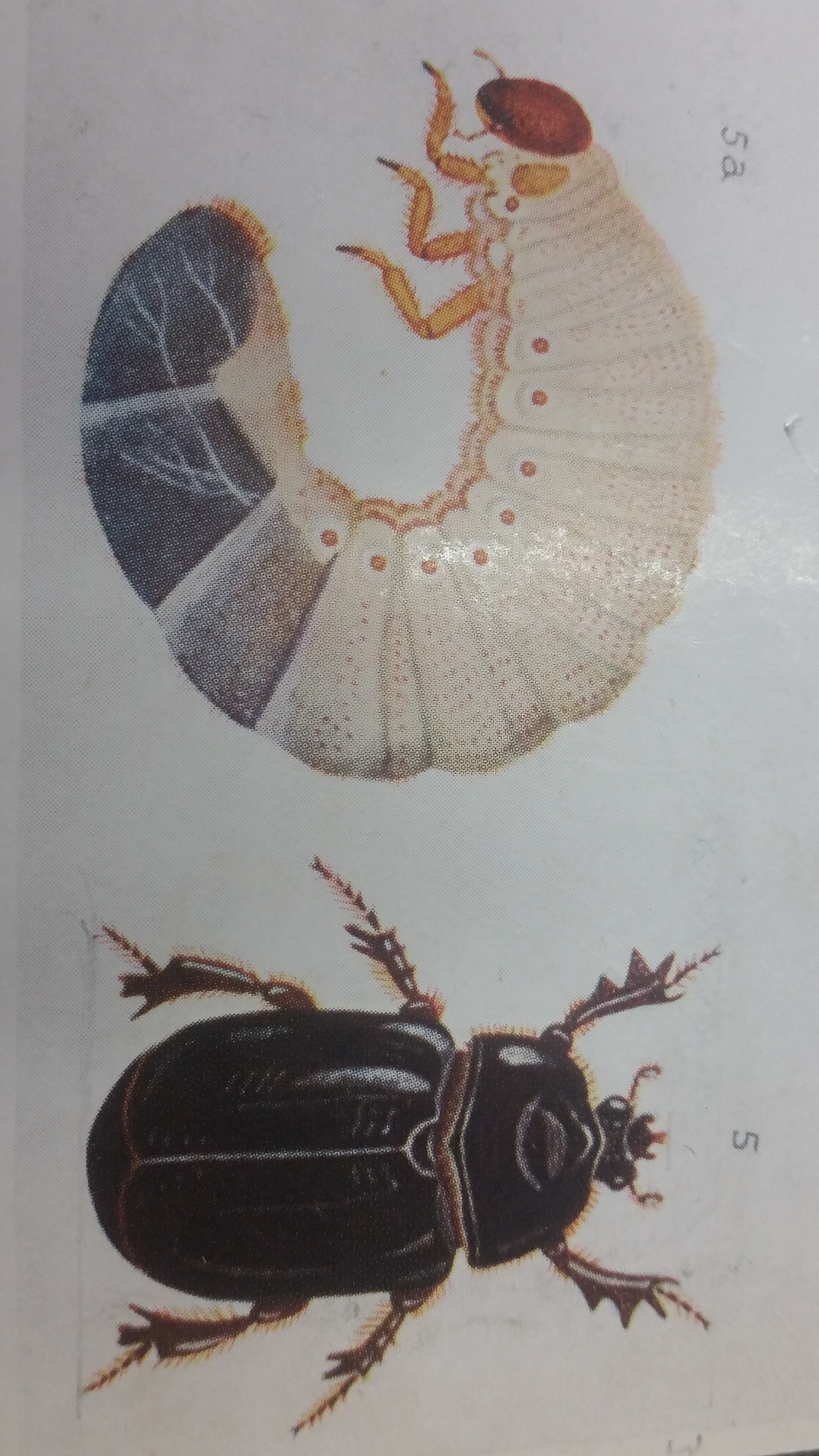
Adult and larvae stage of Pericoptus truncatus

An exotic Scoliidae wasp, the yellow flower wasp, Radumeris tasmaniensis has been found in Northland, North Island, New Zealand. This has been a cause for concern as R. tasmaniensis parasitises on the large sand scarab's larvae. The female stings and paralyses the scarab larva and lays eggs on it. The wasp larva then slowly consumes the paralysed beetle larva.

=== Parasites ===
At certain times of the month Pericoptus truncatus larvae have been observed immersing themselves in the saltwater saturated sand at the low tide zone for a period & then returning to the sand dunes. This behaviour was mostly conducted under the safety of night-time. It has been suggested that this may be the larvae's effort to remove themselves of parasites.

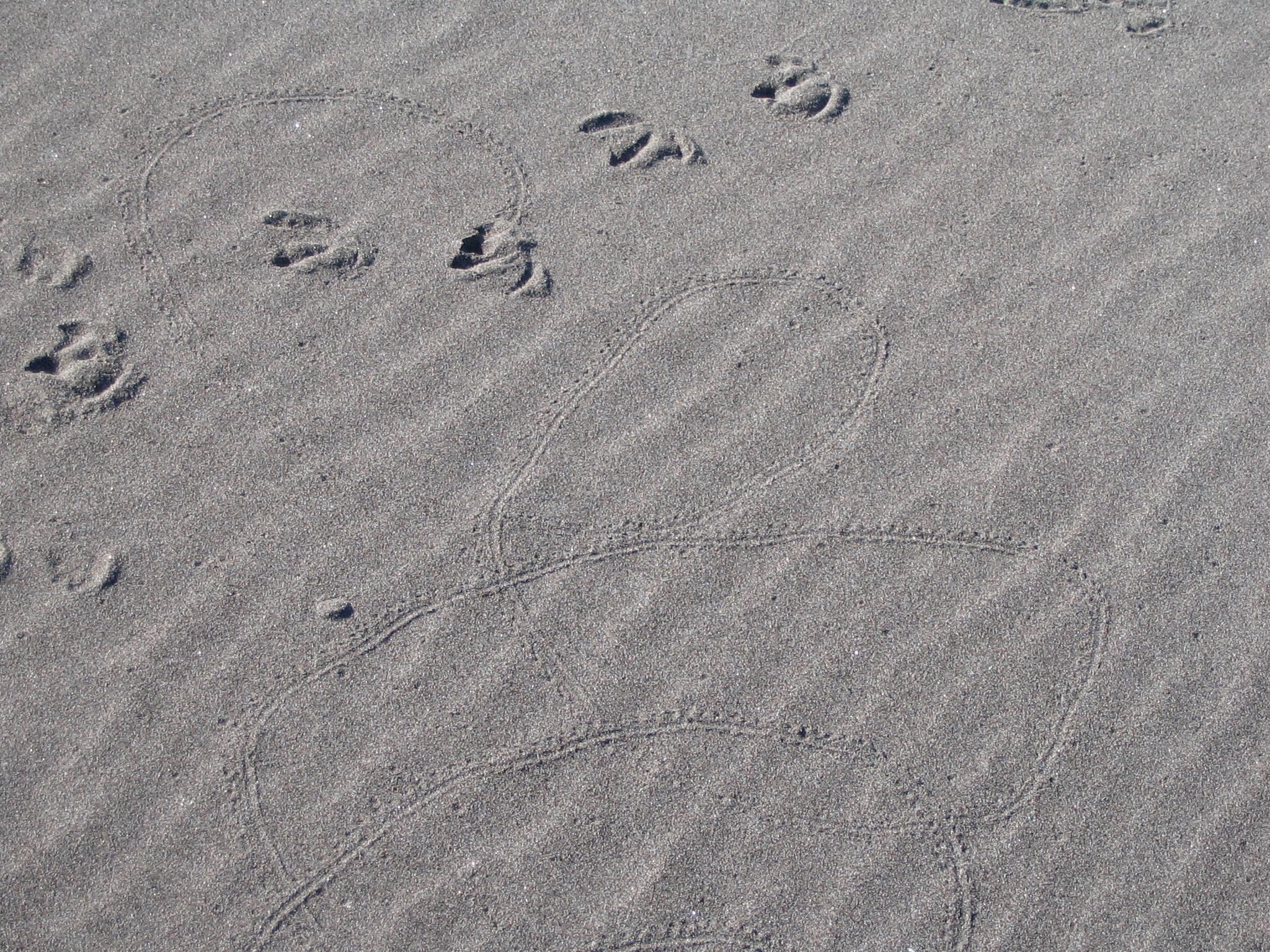
Scarab beetle and bird marks in sand

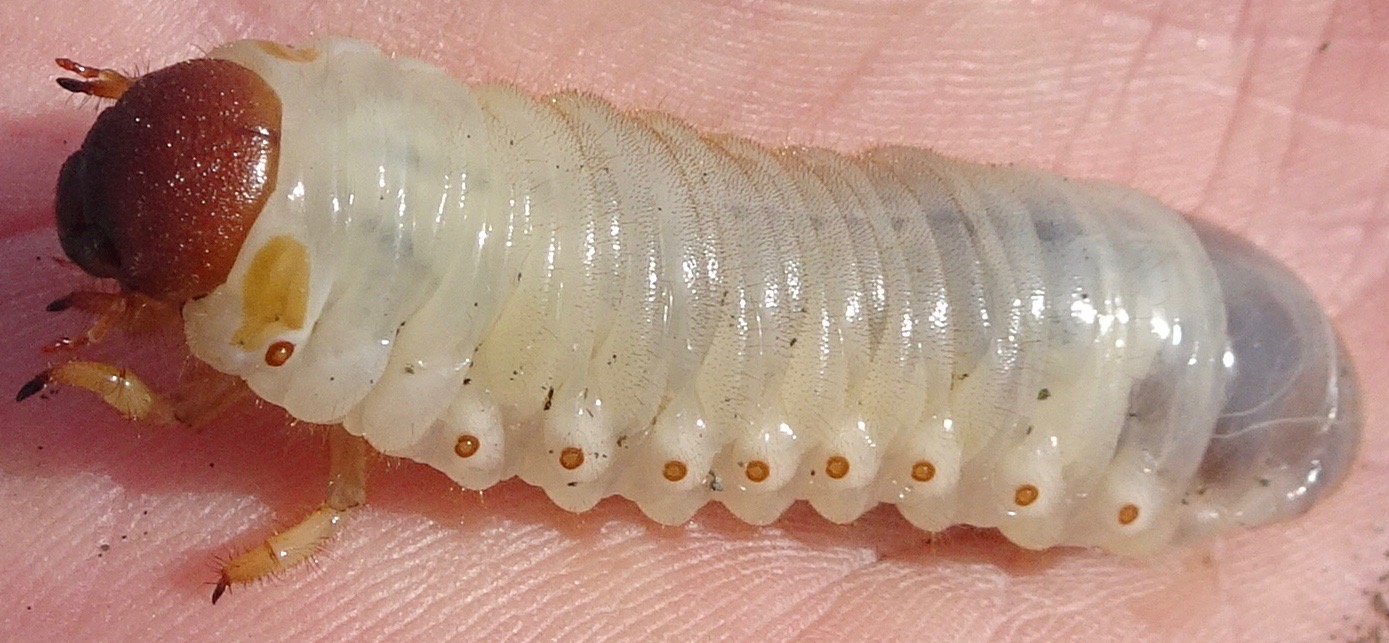
Sand scarab beetle grub found in driftwood
