= Pericoptus frontalis =

Conservation status
- Naturally Uncommon (NZ TCS)

Scientific classification
- Domain: Eukaryota
- Kingdom: Animalia
- Phylum: Arthropoda
- Class: Insecta
- Order: Coleoptera
- Suborder: Polyphaga
- Infraorder: Scarabaeiformia
- Family: Scarabaeidae
- Genus: Pericoptus
- Species: P. frontalis

Binomial name
- Pericoptus frontalis Broun, 1904

Species of beetle

Pericoptus frontalis is a sand scarab native to New Zealand which inhabits sandy river banks and sandbars in inland Otago. It was first described by Thomas Broun in 1904. The European hedgehog is a predator of P. frontalis. Under the New Zealand Threat Classification System, this species is listed as "Naturally Uncommon" with the qualifiers of "Range Restricted".
