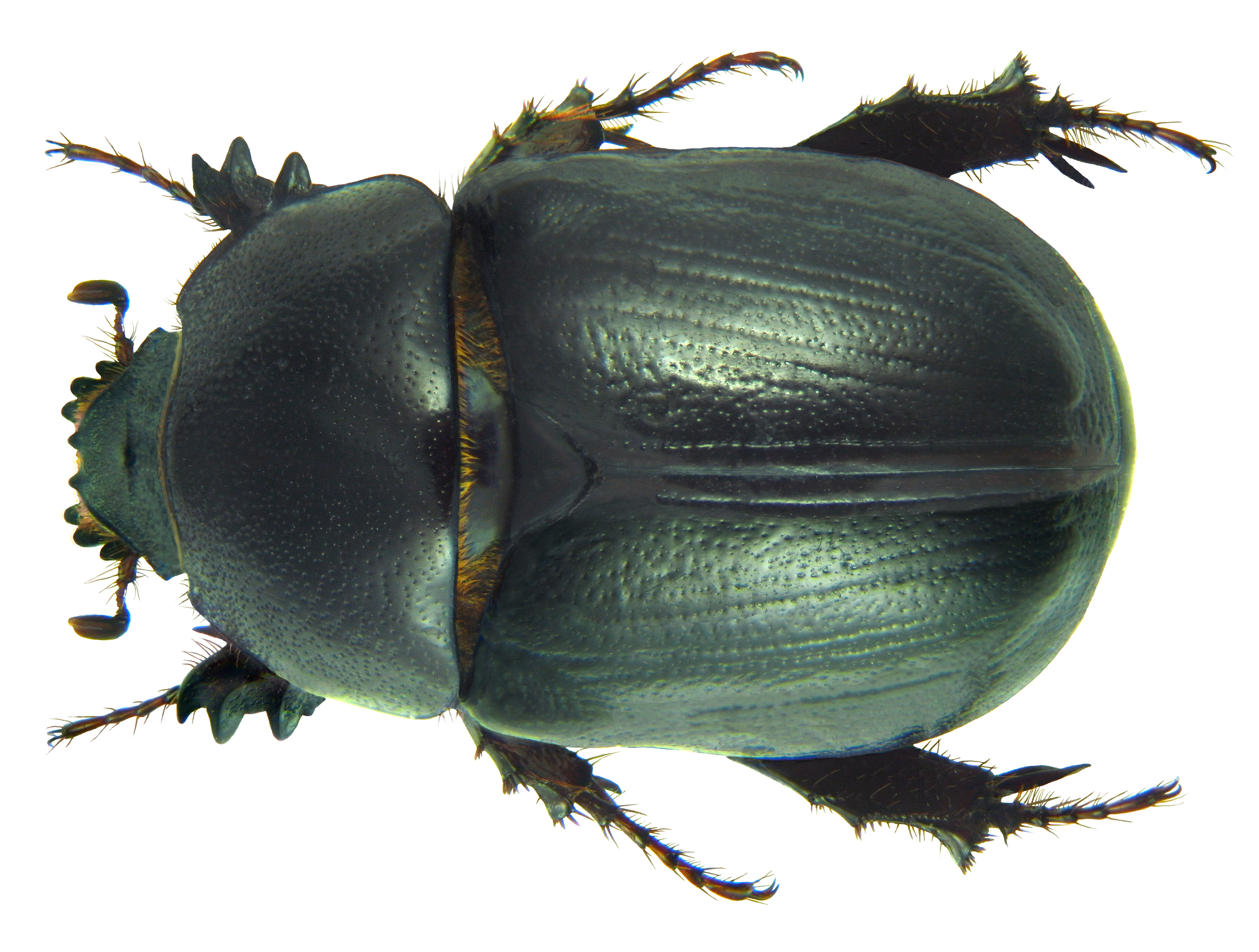
- Pentodon algerinum

Scientific classification
- Kingdom: Animalia
- Phylum: Arthropoda
- Clade: Pancrustacea
- Class: Insecta
- Order: Coleoptera
- Suborder: Polyphaga
- Infraorder: Scarabaeiformia
- Family: Scarabaeidae
- Subfamily: Dynastinae
- Tribe: Pentodontini; Mulsant, 1842

= Pentodontini =

Tribe of beetles

Pentodontini is a tribe of rhinoceros beetles in the family Scarabaeidae. There are over 100 genera in the tribe Pentodontini.

== Genera ==
The following are included in BioLib.cz:

subtribe Cheiroplatina Carne, 1957

1. Cheiroplatys Hope, 1837

subtribe Dipelicina Carne, 1957

1. Dipelicus Hope, 1843

subtribe Pentodontina Mulsant, 1842

1. Bothynus Hope, 1837
2. Calicnemis Laporte de Castelnau, 1832
3. Metanastes Arrow, 1911
4. Neometanastes Yamaya, 2010
5. Pentodon Hope, 1837
6. Pimelopus Erichson, 1842
7. Podalgus Burmeister, 1847

subtribe Pseudoryctina Carne, 1957

1. Pseudoryctes Sharp, 1873

Unplaced genera

1. Aceratus Prell, 1936
2. Adelaeus Ratcliffe, 2014
3. Adoryphorus Blackburn, 1889
4. Alissonotum Arrow, 1908
5. Ampotis Dechambre & Madge, 1979
6. Anomalomorpha Arrow, 1908
7. Anoronotum Arrow, 1939
8. Aphonides Rivers, 1889
9. Aphonodelus Kolbe, 1905
10. Aphonus LeConte, 1856
11. Barutus Ratcliffe, 1981
12. Callistemonus Péringuey, 1901
13. Carneiola Endrödi, 1974
14. Carneodon Özdikmen, 2009
15. Cavonus Sharp, 1875
16. Collagenus Hardy & Ratcliffe, 2004
17. Coptognatus Burmeister, 1847
18. Corynophyllus Hope, 1845
19. Coscinocephalus Prell, 1936
20. Cryptoryctes Carne, 1957
21. Dalgopus Dechambre, 2001
22. Dasygnathus MacLeay, 1819
23. Denhezia Dechambre, 2006
24. Diloboderus Reiche, 1859
25. Ebolowanius Dechambre, 1979
26. Enarotadius Endrödi, 1971
27. Endroedianibe Chalumeau, 1981
28. Enracius Dechambre, 1999
29. Epironastes Carne, 1957
30. Erbmahcedius Hutchinson & Allsopp, 2021
31. Eremobothynus Ohaus, 1910
32. Eucopidocaulus Prell, 1912
33. Euetheola Bates, 1888
34. Euligyrus Casey, 1915
35. Eutyctus Semenov, 1889
36. Gillaspytes Howden, 1980
37. Gorditus Ratcliffe, 2010
38. Haplosoma Semenov, 1889
39. Heteroconus Kolbe, 1900
40. Heteroglobus Dupuis & Dechambre, 2008
41. Heteroligus Kolbe, 1900
42. Heteronychus Burmeister, 1847
43. Heterostriatus Dupuis, 2006
44. Hiekeianus Endrödi, 1978
45. Homoeomorphus Burmeister, 1847
46. Hylobothynus Ohaus, 1910
47. Hyphoryctes Blackburn, 1895
48. Idioschema Arrow, 1914
49. Indieraligus Dechambre, 1979
50. Ligyrus Burmeister, 1847
51. Lonchotus Burmeister, 1847
52. Marronus Coquerel, 1866
53. Mellissius Wollaston, 1869
54. Microryctes Arrow, 1908
55. Musurgus Vauloger, 1898
56. Neocnecus Sharp, 1878
57. Neocorynophyllus Carne, 1985
58. Neodasygnathus Carne, 1957
59. Neonastes Carne, 1957
60. Neoryctes Arrow, 1908
61. Nephrodopus Sharp, 1873
62. Nimbacola Paulian, 1970
63. Niuailan Allsopp & Hutchinson, 2020
64. Novapus Sharp, 1875
65. Orizabus Fairmaire, 1878
66. Orsilochus (beetle) Burmeister, 1847
67. Orthocavonus Carne, 1957
68. Oxyligyrus Arrow, 1908
69. Papuana Arrow, 1911
70. Paranodon Cock, 1905
71. Parapucaya Prell, 1934
72. Pareteronychus Prell, 1934
73. Parisomorphus Schaufuss, 1890
74. Pentodina Endrödi, 1968
75. Pentodontoschema Péringuey, 1901
76. Pericoptus Burmeister, 1847
77. Philoscaptus Brèthes, 1919
78. Phylliocephala Blackburn, 1890
79. Phyllognathus Eschscholtz, 1830
80. Piscoperus Ratcliffe & Giraldo, 2014
81. Prionoryctes Arrow, 1911
82. Proculigyrus López-García & Deloya, 2022
83. Pseudocavonus Blackburn, 1890
84. Pseudohomonyx Arrow, 1908
85. Pucaya Ohaus, 1910
86. Pycnoschema Thomson, 1858
87. Saccharoscaptus Morón Rios & Grossi, 2015
88. Semanopterus Hope, 1847
89. Siralus Dechambre, 1997
90. Teinogenys Sharp, 1873
91. Temnorhynchus Hope, 1837
92. Thronistes Burmeister, 1847
93. Tomarus Erichson, 1847
94. Trissodon Burmeister, 1847
95. Wernoryctes Dechambre, 1999
96. Xynedria Blackburn, 1894
