= Monneocrates nasutus =

Scientific classification
- Kingdom: Animalia
- Phylum: Arthropoda
- Clade: Pancrustacea
- Class: Insecta
- Order: Coleoptera
- Suborder: Polyphaga
- Infraorder: Scarabaeiformia
- Family: Scarabaeidae
- Genus: Monneocrates
- Species: M. nasutus

Binomial name
- Monneocrates nasutus (Dechambre, 1979)

Synonyms
- Stenocrates nasutus Dechambre, 1979

Species of beetle

Monneocrates nasutus is a species of beetle of the family Scarabaeidae. It is found in Brazil (Acre, Amazonas), Ecuador, French Guiana and Peru.

== Description ==
Adults reach a length of about 18 mm (0.71 in). They are completely black, with yellowish or reddish setae scattered on the ventral surface.
