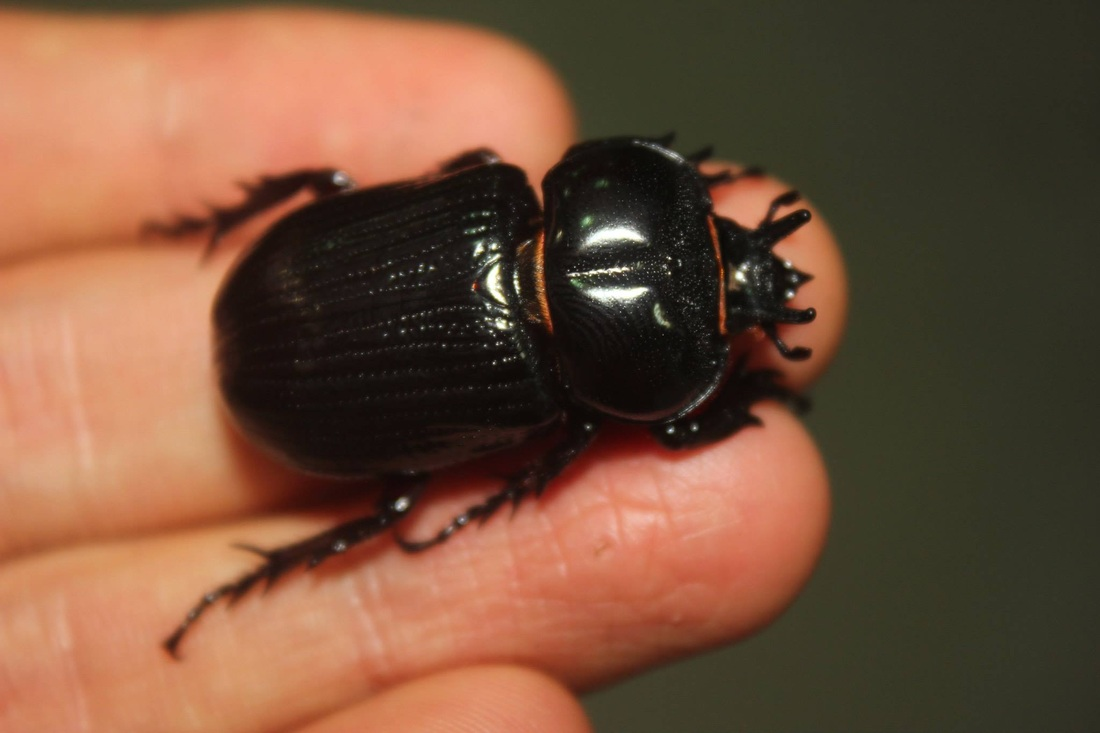
- Adult female

Scientific classification
- Kingdom: Animalia
- Phylum: Arthropoda
- Class: Insecta
- Order: Coleoptera
- Suborder: Polyphaga
- Infraorder: Scarabaeiformia
- Family: Scarabaeidae
- Genus: Phileurus
- Species: P. truncatus

Binomial name
- Phileurus truncatus (Palisot de Beauvois, 1806)

Synonyms
- Phileurus recurvatas (Casey, 1915)

= Phileurus truncatus =

Species of beetle

Phileurus truncatus, the triceratops beetle, is a species of beetle of the family Scarabaeidae. It ranges across much of southern North America, up to the central south. It is known for its three horns present on both sexes.

== Description ==
As adults, they can range from 32-38 millimeters. Both adult males and females have large and distinct horns on the head. Males have thicker, more blunt horns that curve more aggressively towards its body, while females have thinner, straighter, pointier horns. They have a divot running down the center of their prothorax dividing both sides, with a very small bump just before the divot. They produce stridulations as a reaction to being disturbed.

They are similar in appearance to Hemiphileurus illatus, but are over 7-13mm longer and lack the notable speckled divots across their body.

As grubs, they live inside of the rotting trunks of trees (Oak being a common host tree), and consume the rotting wood beneath the bark of the tree.

After pupating into adults, they consume the grubs of other beetles as well as other bugs if given the chance, but have been noted to eat fruit as well, though less often.

== Distribution ==
Virginia, south to Florida, west to Tennessee and southeastern Arizona.
