= Monneocrates parabolicus =

Scientific classification
- Kingdom: Animalia
- Phylum: Arthropoda
- Clade: Pancrustacea
- Class: Insecta
- Order: Coleoptera
- Suborder: Polyphaga
- Infraorder: Scarabaeiformia
- Family: Scarabaeidae
- Genus: Monneocrates
- Species: M. parabolicus

Binomial name
- Monneocrates parabolicus Duarte, Grossi & Vaz-de-Mello, 2026

Species of beetle

Monneocrates parabolicus is a species of beetle of the family Scarabaeidae. It is found in Brazil (Mato Grosso).

== Description ==
Adults reach a length of about 17.5 mm (0.69 in). They are completely black, and shiny under white light.

== Etymology ==
The species name refers to the shape of the prosternal process, which immediately distinguishes the species from its congener.
