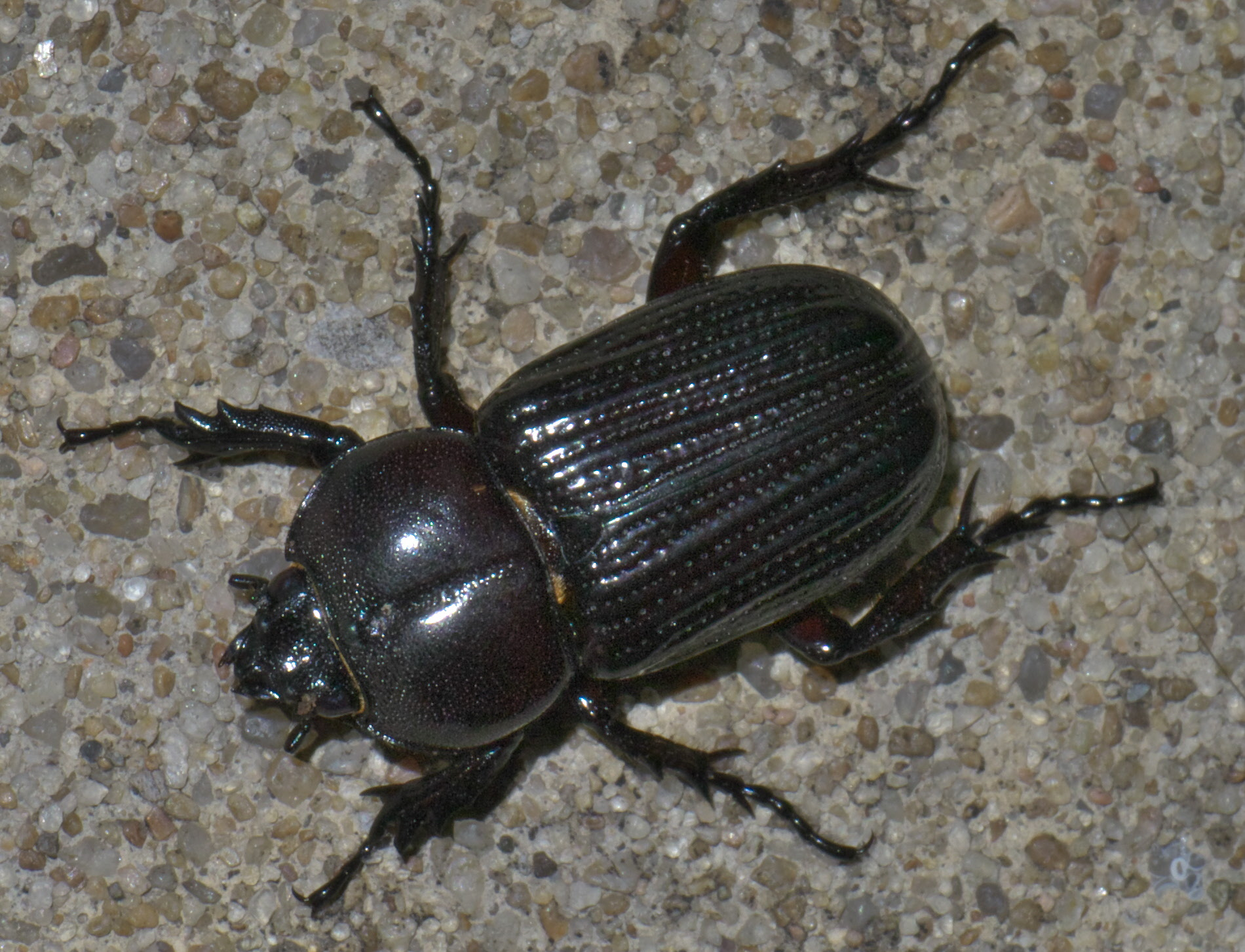

Scientific classification
- Kingdom: Animalia
- Phylum: Arthropoda
- Clade: Pancrustacea
- Class: Insecta
- Order: Coleoptera
- Suborder: Polyphaga
- Infraorder: Scarabaeiformia
- Family: Scarabaeidae
- Genus: Phileurus
- Species: P. valgus

Binomial name
- Phileurus valgus (Olivier, 1789)

Synonyms
- Epiphileurus septentrionis Kolbe, 1910; Phileurus capra Bates, 1888; Phileurus carolinae Casey, 1915; Phileurus castaneus Haldeman, 1843; Phileurus floridanus Casey, 1915; Phileurus sulcifer Casey, 1915; Phileurus texensis Casey, 1915

= Phileurus valgus =

Species of beetle

Phileurus valgus is a species of rhinoceros beetle in the family Scarabaeidae.

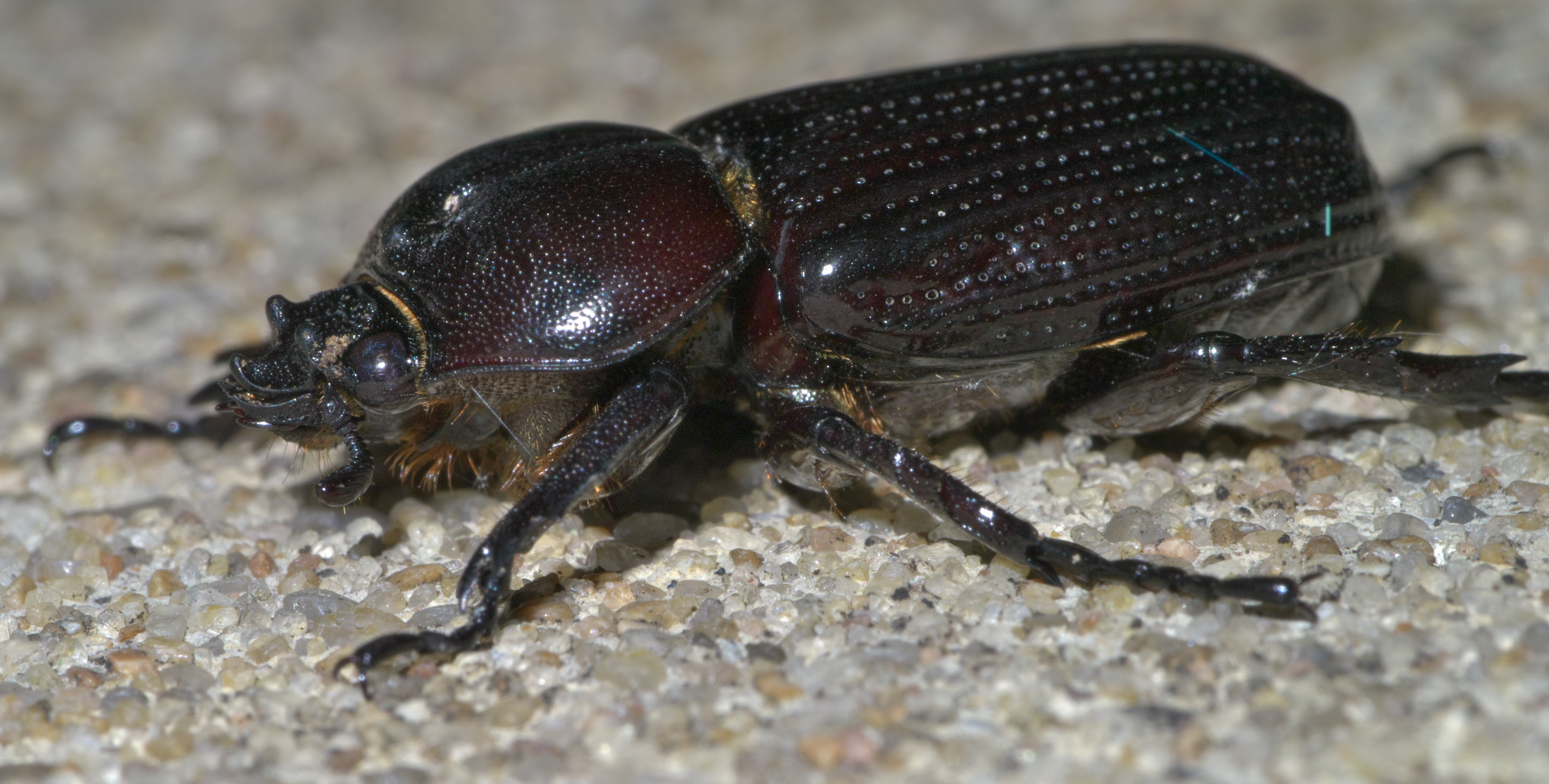
