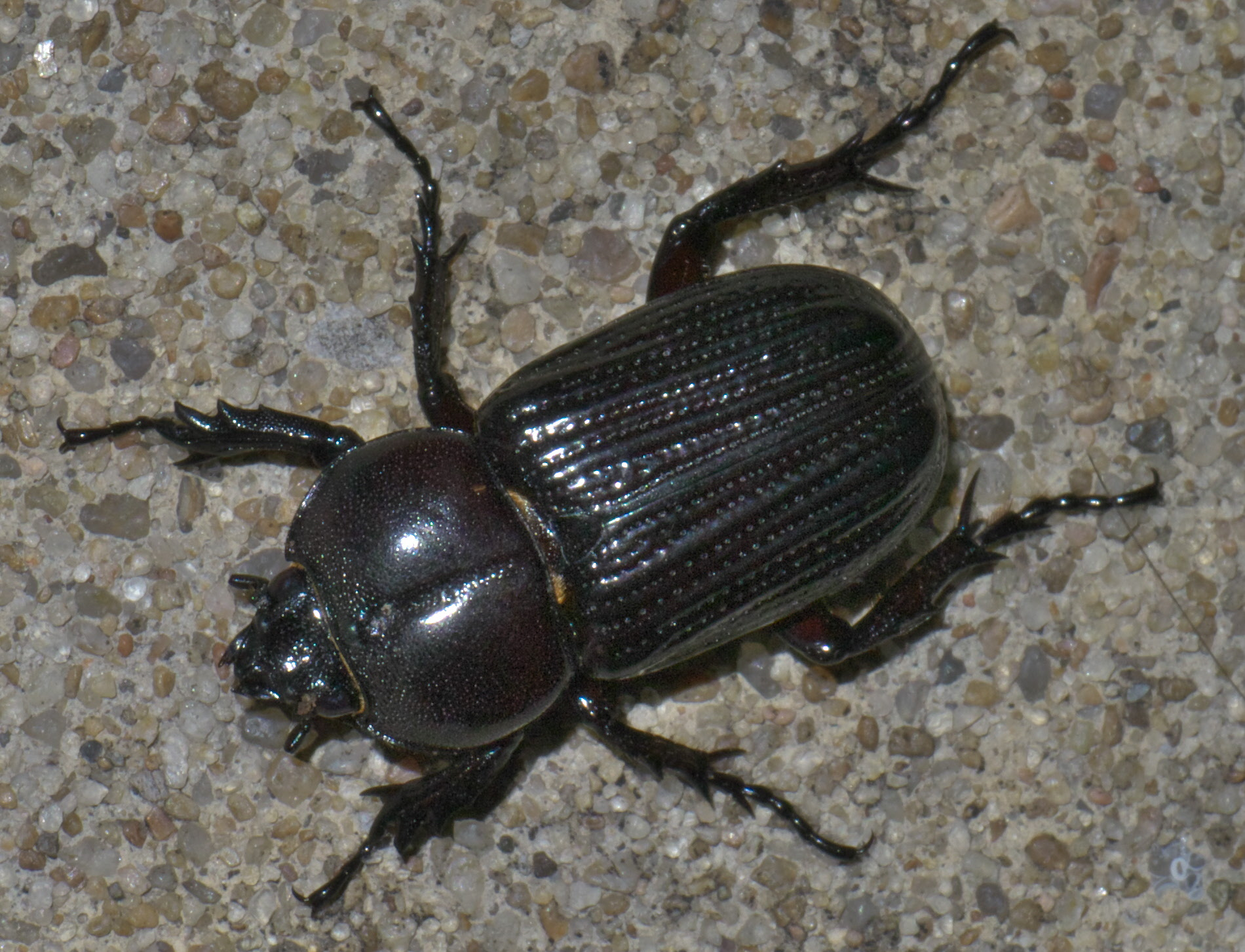
- Phileurus valgus

Scientific classification
- Kingdom: Animalia
- Phylum: Arthropoda
- Class: Insecta
- Order: Coleoptera
- Suborder: Polyphaga
- Infraorder: Scarabaeiformia
- Family: Scarabaeidae
- Subfamily: Dynastinae
- Tribe: Phileurini
- Genus: Phileurus; Latreille, 1807

= Phileurus =

Genus of beetles

Phileurus is a genus of rhinoceros beetles in the family Scarabaeidae. There are more than 20 described species in Phileurus.

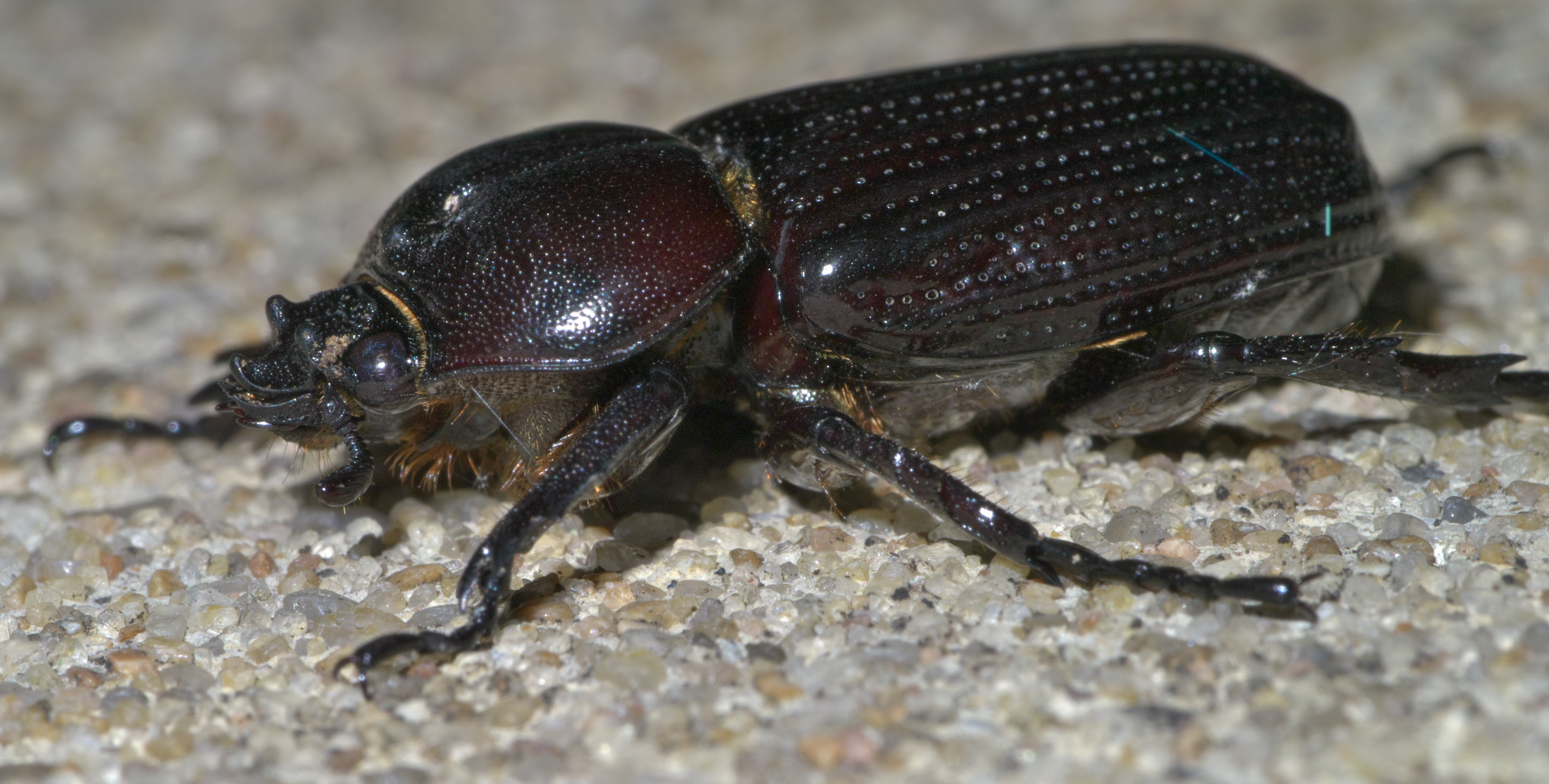
Phileurus valgus

== Species ==
These 28 species belong to the genus Phileurus:

- Phileurus affinis Burmeister, 1847
- Phileurus angustatus Kolbe, 1910
- Phileurus bucculentus Ohaus, 1911
- Phileurus buchwaldi Ohaus, 1914
- Phileurus caribaeus Ratcliffe & Cave, 2015
- Phileurus carinatus Prell, 1914
- Phileurus didymus (Linnaeus, 1758)
- Phileurus endrodii Lamant-Voirin, 1995
- Phileurus enigmaticus Dupuis, 2004
- Phileurus excavatus Prell, 1911
- Phileurus hospes Burmeister, 1847
- Phileurus hospitus Prell, 1934
- Phileurus incurvatus Endrödi, 1978
- Phileurus kaszabi Endrödi, 1978
- Phileurus lecourti Dechambre, 1998
- Phileurus limicauda Prell, 1912
- Phileurus mundus Prell, 1914
- Phileurus patruus Endrödi, 1978
- Phileurus rufus Dechambre, 1998
- Phileurus schereri Endrödi, 1981
- Phileurus toulgoeti Dechambre, 1996
- Phileurus truncatus (Palisot de Beauvois, 1806) (triceratops beetle)
- Phileurus valgus (Olivier, 1789)
- Phileurus verus Endrödi, 1978
- Phileurus villaemagnae Dechambre, 1998
- Phileurus voirinae Endrödi, 1985
- Phileurus youngi Ratcliffe, 1988
- Phileurus zonianis Ratcliffe, 2011
