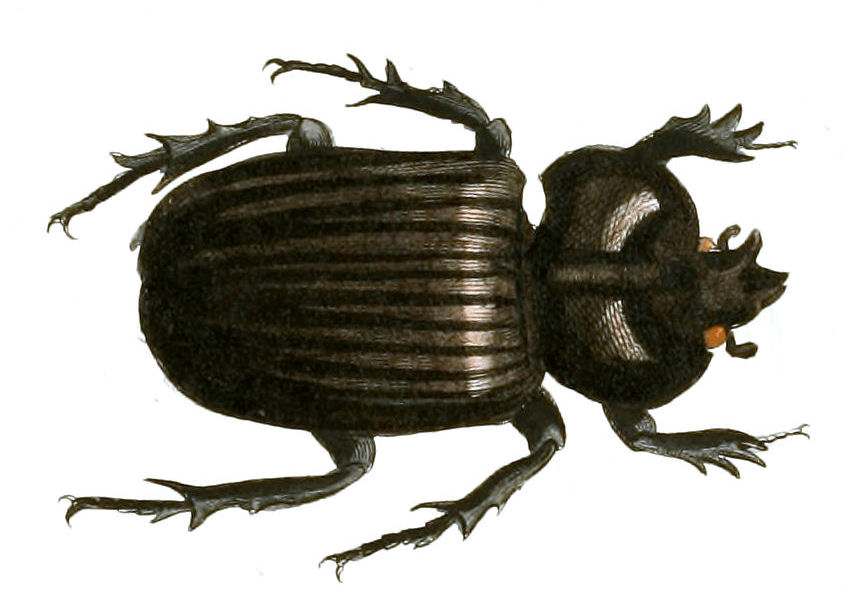

Scientific classification
- Kingdom: Animalia
- Phylum: Arthropoda
- Class: Insecta
- Order: Coleoptera
- Suborder: Polyphaga
- Infraorder: Scarabaeiformia
- Family: Scarabaeidae
- Genus: Phileurus
- Species: P. didymus

Binomial name
- Phileurus didymus (Linnaeus, 1758)

= Phileurus didymus =

Species of beetle

Phileurus didymus is a species of wood-feeding beetle of the family Scarabaeidae.

== Description ==
Head, black, small, and triangular, having three tubercles issuing from it, of which the anterior is pointed, the others blunt. Thorax black, which is the general colour of the insect, rounded, smooth, and margined, having an impression in front, with a short tubercle situated on it near the edge; from whence runs a hollow groove or channel to the posterior margin. Scutellum small. Elytra shining, margined and furrowed. Abdomen smooth and shining, without hair. Tibiae furnished with spines, as are the first joints of the middle and posterior tarsi. Length 2 inches.

== Distribution ==
Phileurus didymus is native to Central America, and is also found in Peru and French Guiana.
