= Hemiphileurus =

Scientific classification
- Domain: Eukaryota
- Kingdom: Animalia
- Phylum: Arthropoda
- Class: Insecta
- Order: Coleoptera
- Suborder: Polyphaga
- Infraorder: Scarabaeiformia
- Family: Scarabaeidae
- Tribe: Phileurini
- Genus: Hemiphileurus; Kolbe, 1910

Synonyms
- Epiphileurus Kolbe, 1910

Genus of beetles

Hemiphileurus is a genus of rhinoceros beetles in the family Scarabaeidae. There are at least 60 described species in Hemiphileurus.

== Species ==
These 60 species belong to the genus Hemiphileurus:

- Hemiphileurus agnus (Burmeister, 1847)
- Hemiphileurus beckeri (Kolbe, 1910)
- Hemiphileurus bispinosus Ratcliffe, 2001
- Hemiphileurus blandinae Dupuis, 1996
- Hemiphileurus brasiliensis Endrödi, 1978
- Hemiphileurus caliensis Endrödi, 1985
- Hemiphileurus carinatipennis Dupuis & Dechambre, 2000
- Hemiphileurus cavei Ratcliffe, 2003
- Hemiphileurus cayennensis Endrödi, 1985
- Hemiphileurus chantali Hardy & Dupuis, 2016
- Hemiphileurus complanatus (Palisot de Beauvois, 1809)
- Hemiphileurus cornutus Ratcliffe, 2014
- Hemiphileurus costatus Endrödi, 1978
- Hemiphileurus cubaensis (Chalumeau, 1981)
- Hemiphileurus curoei Ratcliffe, 2003
- Hemiphileurus curvicornis Dupuis & Dechambre, 2000
- Hemiphileurus cylindroides (Bates, 1888)
- Hemiphileurus dechambrei Ratcliffe, 2003
- Hemiphileurus dejeani (Bates, 1888)
- Hemiphileurus depressus (Fabricius, 1801)
- Hemiphileurus deslislesi Ratcliffe, 2001
- Hemiphileurus dispar (Kolbe, 1910)
- Hemiphileurus dyscritus Ratcliffe, 2003
- Hemiphileurus elbitae Neita & Ratcliffe, 2010
- Hemiphileurus elongatus Dupuis & Dechambre, 2000
- Hemiphileurus euniceae Ratcliffe & Cave, 2006
- Hemiphileurus flohri (Kolbe, 1910)
- Hemiphileurus gibbosus Dupuis & Dechambre, 2000
- Hemiphileurus gloriae Ponchel, 2009
- Hemiphileurus hiekei Chalumeau, 1988
- Hemiphileurus howdeni Endrödi, 1978
- Hemiphileurus illatus (LeConte, 1854)
- Hemiphileurus insularis Ratcliffe, 1988
- Hemiphileurus isabellae Dupuis, 2004
- Hemiphileurus jamaicensis (Howden, 1970)
- Hemiphileurus kahni Dupuis & Dechambre, 2000
- Hemiphileurus laevicauda (Bates, 1888)
- Hemiphileurus laeviceps Arrow, 1947
- Hemiphileurus laticollis (Burmeister, 1847)
- Hemiphileurus microps (Burmeister, 1847)
- Hemiphileurus nebulohylaeus Ratcliffe, 2003
- Hemiphileurus panamanius Ratcliffe & Curoe, 2011
- Hemiphileurus parvus Dupuis & Dechambre, 2000
- Hemiphileurus phratrius Ratcliffe & Ivie, 1998
- Hemiphileurus puertoricensis (Chapin, 1935)
- Hemiphileurus punctatostriatus (Prell, 1914)
- Hemiphileurus pygidiopunctissimus Ratcliffe, 2003
- Hemiphileurus quadridentatus Ratcliffe, 2001
- Hemiphileurus ratcliffei Dupuis, 2016
- Hemiphileurus rugulosus Endrödi, 1978
- Hemiphileurus ryani Ratcliffe & Ivie, 1998
- Hemiphileurus scutellatus Howden & Endrodi, 1978
- Hemiphileurus similis Dupuis & Dechambre, 2000
- Hemiphileurus simplex (Prell, 1914)
- Hemiphileurus tainorum Ratcliffe & Cave, 2015
- Hemiphileurus unilobus Dupuis & Dechambre, 2000
- Hemiphileurus variolosus (Burmeister, 1847)
- Hemiphileurus vicarius Prell, 1936
- Hemiphileurus vulgatus Dupuis & Dechambre, 2000
- Hemiphileurus warneri Ratcliffe, 2001
