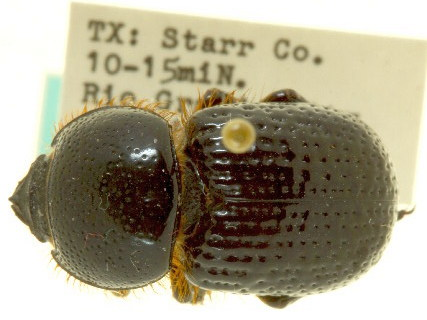
- Archophileurus cribrosus

Scientific classification
- Domain: Eukaryota
- Kingdom: Animalia
- Phylum: Arthropoda
- Class: Insecta
- Order: Coleoptera
- Suborder: Polyphaga
- Infraorder: Scarabaeiformia
- Family: Scarabaeidae
- Tribe: Phileurini
- Genus: Archophileurus; Kolbe, 1910

Synonyms
- Amblyphileurus Kolbe, 1910; Anisophileurus Prell, 1914; Periphileurus Kolbe, 1910

= Archophileurus =

Genus of beetles

Archophileurus is a genus of rhinoceros beetles in the family Scarabaeidae. There are at least 30 described species in Archophileurus.

== Species ==
These 32 species belong to the genus Archophileurus:

- Archophileurus alternans Endrödi, 1977^{c g}
- Archophileurus aper Endrödi, 1977^{c g}
- Archophileurus bifoveatus Endrödi, 1977^{c g}
- Archophileurus burmeisteri (Arrow, 1908)^{c}
- Archophileurus chaconus (Kolbe, 1910)^{c g}
- Archophileurus clarionicus Moron, 1990^{c g}
- Archophileurus cribrosus (LeConte, 1854)^{i c g b}
- Archophileurus digitalia (Herbst, 1789)^{c g}
- Archophileurus elatus (Prell, 1914)^{c g}
- Archophileurus fimbriatus (Burmeister, 1847)^{c g}
- Archophileurus fodiens (Kolbe, 1910)^{c g}
- Archophileurus foveicollis (Burmeister, 1847)^{c g}
- Archophileurus guyanus Dechambre, 2006^{c g}
- Archophileurus kolbeanus Ohaus, 1910^{c g}
- Archophileurus latipennis (Burmeister, 1847)^{c g}
- Archophileurus mirabilis Ratcliffe & Cave, 2015^{c g}
- Archophileurus oedipus (Prell, 1912)^{c g}
- Archophileurus opacostriatus (Ohaus, 1911)^{c g}
- Archophileurus ovis (Burmeister, 1847)^{c g}
- Archophileurus passaloides (Prell, 1914)^{c g}
- Archophileurus peruanus Endrödi, 1977^{c g}
- Archophileurus petropolitanus (Ohaus, 1910)^{c g}
- Archophileurus quadrivii Dechambre, 2006^{c g}
- Archophileurus simplex (Bates, 1888)^{c g}
- Archophileurus spinosus Dechambre, 2006^{c g}
- Archophileurus sus Dechambre, 2006^{c g}
- Archophileurus temnorrhynchodes Lamant-Voirin, 1995^{c g}
- Archophileurus tmetoplus (Prell, 1912)^{c g}
- Archophileurus trituberculatus Endrödi, 1977^{c g}
- Archophileurus vervex (Burmeister, 1847)^{c g}
- Archophileurus wagneri (Ohaus, 1911)^{c g}
- Archophileurus zischkai Endrödi, 1981^{c g}

Data sources: i = ITIS, c = Catalogue of Life, g = GBIF, b = Bugguide.net
