= Monneocrates =

Scientific classification
- Kingdom: Animalia
- Phylum: Arthropoda
- Clade: Pancrustacea
- Class: Insecta
- Order: Coleoptera
- Suborder: Polyphaga
- Infraorder: Scarabaeiformia
- Family: Scarabaeidae
- Subfamily: Dynastinae
- Tribe: Phileurini
- Genus: Monneocrates; Duarte, Grossi & Vaz-de-Mello, 2026

Genus of beetles

Monneocrates is a genus of beetles of the family Scarabaeidae.

== Species ==
- Monneocrates nasutus (Dechambre, 1979)
- Monneocrates parabolicus Duarte, Grossi & Vaz-de-Mello, 2026

== Etymology ==
The generic name Monneocrates is given in honour of the Coleoptera taxonomist Miguel Ángel Monné Barrios.
