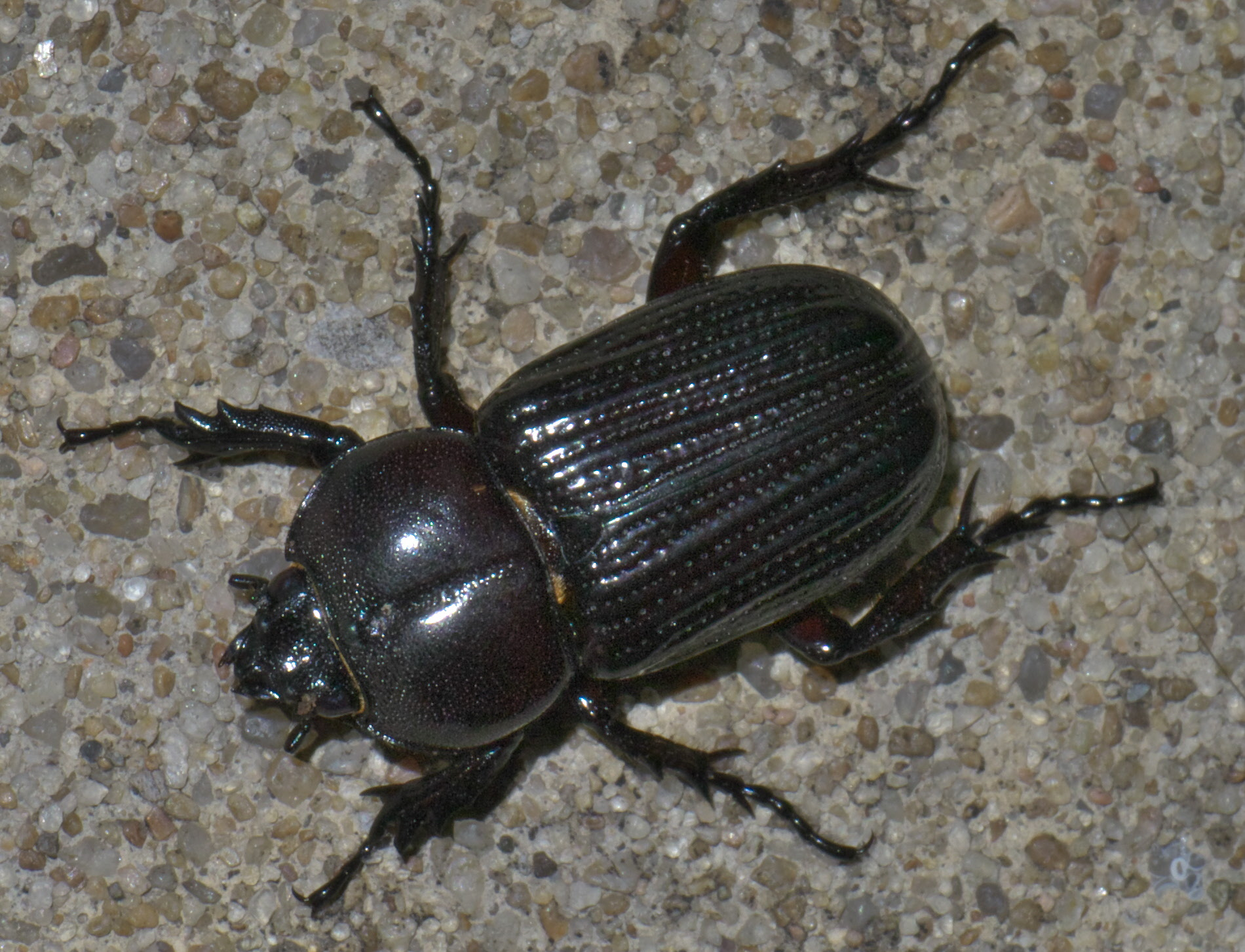
- Phileurus valgus

Scientific classification
- Kingdom: Animalia
- Phylum: Arthropoda
- Clade: Pancrustacea
- Class: Insecta
- Order: Coleoptera
- Suborder: Polyphaga
- Infraorder: Scarabaeiformia
- Family: Scarabaeidae
- Subfamily: Dynastinae
- Tribe: Phileurini; Burmeister, 1847

Synonyms
- Phileuridae Burmeister, 1847

= Phileurini =

Tribe of beetles

The Phileurini are a tribe of beetles in the subfamily Dynastinae.

== Subtribes and Genera ==
subtribe Cryptodina Burmeister & Schaum, 1840

1. Cryptodus MacLeay, 1819

subtribe Phileurina Burmeister, 1847

1. Archophileurus Kolbe, 1910
2. Caymania Ratcliffe & Cave, 2010
3. Ceratophileurus Ohaus, 1911
4. Chiliphileurus Endrödi, 1977
5. Cnemidophileurus Kolbe, 1910
6. Goniophileurus Kolbe, 1910
7. Haplophileurus Kolbe, 1910
8. Hemiphileurus Kolbe, 1910
9. Homophileurus Kolbe, 1910
10. Hovophileurus Arrow, 1911
11. Metaphileurus Kolbe, 1910
12. Oryctophileurus Kolbe, 1910
13. Phileurus Latreille, 1807
14. Prosphileurus Kolbe, 1905

Subtribe not assigned

1. Actinobolus Westwood, 1841
2. Allophileurinus Dupuis & Dechambre, 2001
3. Amblyodus Westwood, 1878
4. Amblyoproctus Kolbe, 1910
5. Archophanes Kolbe, 1905
6. Eophileurus Arrow, 1908
7. Kirprellius Allsopp, 2022
8. Macrocyphonistes Ohaus, 1910
9. Microphileurus Kolbe, 1910
10. Mictophileurus Ohaus, 1911
11. Monneocrates Duarte, Grossi & Vaz-de-Mello, 2026
12. Moraguesia Dechambre, 2008
13. Palaeophileurus Kolbe, 1910
14. Paraphileurus Endrödi, 1978
15. Phileucourtus Dechambre, 2008
16. Planophileurus Chapin, 1932
17. Platyphileurus Ohaus, 1910
18. Pseudosyrichthus Péringuey, 1901
19. Rhizoplatodes Péringuey, 1901
20. Rhizoplatys Westwood, 1841
21. Syrichthodontus Péringuey, 1901
22. Syrichthomorphus Péringuey, 1901
23. Syrichthoschema Janssens, 1942
24. Trioplus Burmeister, 1847
