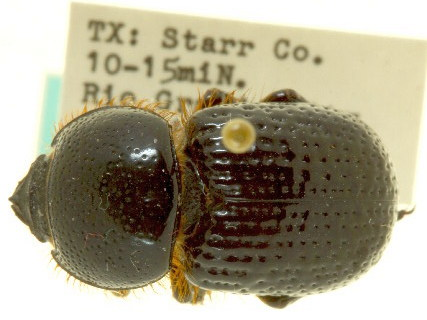

Scientific classification
- Domain: Eukaryota
- Kingdom: Animalia
- Phylum: Arthropoda
- Class: Insecta
- Order: Coleoptera
- Suborder: Polyphaga
- Infraorder: Scarabaeiformia
- Family: Scarabaeidae
- Genus: Archophileurus
- Species: A. cribrosus

Binomial name
- Archophileurus cribrosus (LeConte, 1854)

Synonyms
- Archophileurus brevis Casey, 1915; Archophileurus bullatus Casey, 1915; Archophileurus longulus Casey, 1915

= Archophileurus cribrosus =

Species of beetle

Archophileurus cribrosus is a species of rhinoceros beetle in the family Scarabaeidae.
