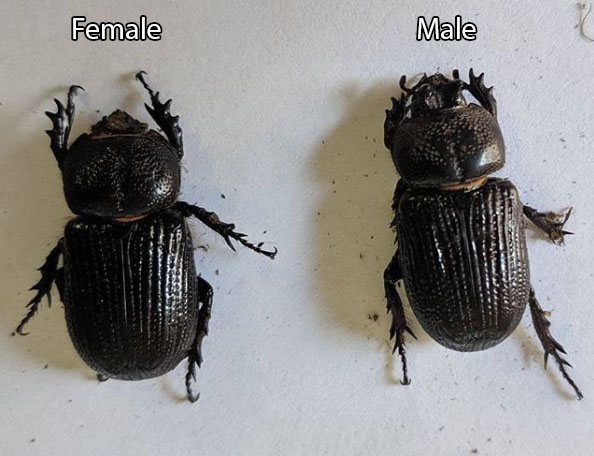

Scientific classification
- Domain: Eukaryota
- Kingdom: Animalia
- Phylum: Arthropoda
- Class: Insecta
- Order: Coleoptera
- Suborder: Polyphaga
- Infraorder: Scarabaeiformia
- Family: Scarabaeidae
- Genus: Hemiphileurus
- Species: H. illatus

Binomial name
- Hemiphileurus illatus (LeConte, 1854)

Synonyms
- Phileurus vitulus LeConte, 1863

= Hemiphileurus illatus =

Species of beetle

Hemiphileurus illatus is a species of rhinoceros beetle in the family Scarabaeidae. Its range is the Southwestern United States. Its common name is the lesser triceratops beetle.

== Description ==
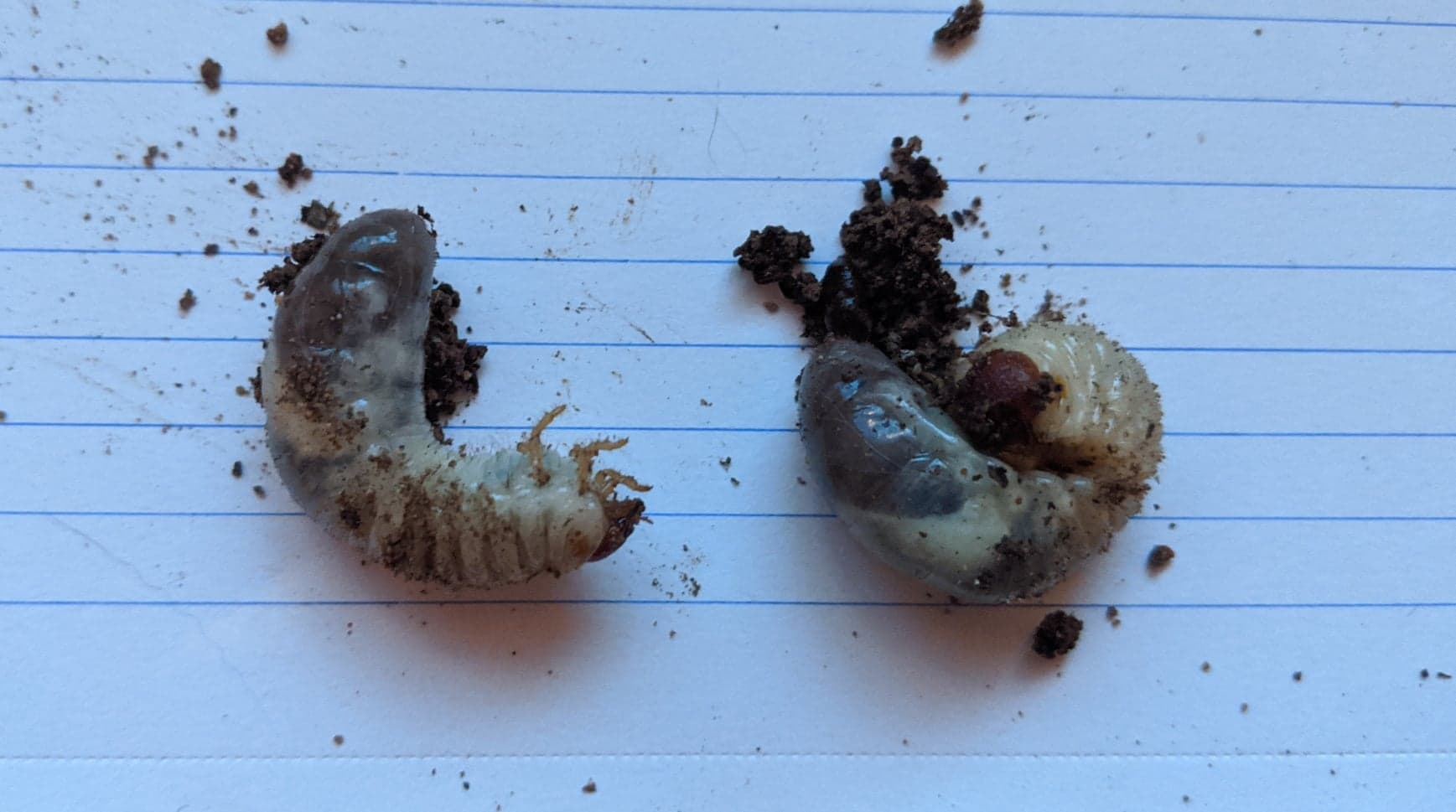
Two larvae

As adults, this species is black with a pitted thorax and elytra. All six legs have short spines. They are 19 - 25 mm long.

Both sexes have a pair of horns but the females' are much smaller, more like bumps or short nubs. Unlike their close cousins, Phileurus truncatus, neither sex has the notable third horn.

As larvae, they have cream-colored bodies and reddish-brown heads. They have a C-shaped posture, and move on their sides when above ground.

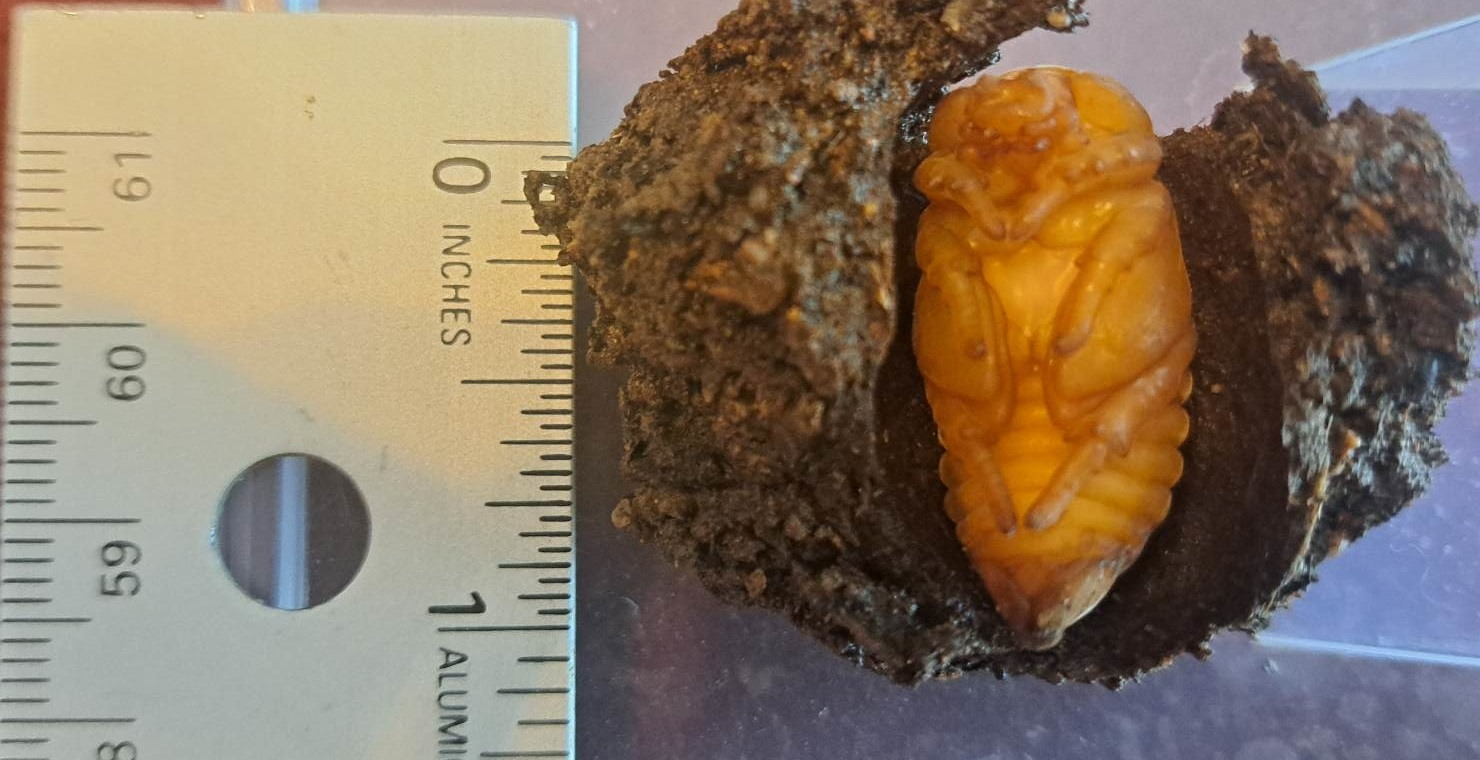
A pupa

As pupae, they are exarate with the ability to move their abdominal segments. As pupation progresses, their joints, faces, and tips of their legs change from tan to dark brown.

== Distribution ==
H. illatus is found in the Southwestern United States, primarily Arizona, Nevada, New Mexico, and California. It is found in urban and rural areas.

== Diet ==
Adults are detritivores and scavengers. They eat fresh or rotting plant matter and other dead insects. In captivity, they will eat freshly-killed mealworms, fruits, and vegetables.They are protein feeders and show preference for insects and eggs over other food.

== Behavior ==
Both adults and larvae burrow and spend most of their time underground. In captivity, they can be kept together or with other insect species relatively safely, but they may eat wounded or vulnerable individuals like eggs, larvae, or pupae.

In urban areas, they may be found around compost heaps. Adults are attracted to UV light.

Adult beetles are capable of stridulation and produce a quiet but audible 'chirp' when agitated.

== Relationship with Humans ==
They are not agricultural pests and pose no significant danger to humans or domestic animals.

It is legal to own and sell lesser triceratops beetles. Like many desert beetles, they are low-maintenance to keep, but are not especially popular or sought-after within the beetle-keeping community.
