= Cephalotes jamaicensis =

Scientific classification
- Domain: Eukaryota
- Kingdom: Animalia
- Phylum: Arthropoda
- Class: Insecta
- Order: Hymenoptera
- Family: Formicidae
- Subfamily: Myrmicinae
- Genus: Cephalotes
- Species: C. jamaicensis

Binomial name
- Cephalotes jamaicensis (Forel, 1922)

Species of ant

Cephalotes jamaicensis is a species of arboreal ant of the genus Cephalotes, characterized by an odd shaped head and the ability to "parachute" by steering their fall if they drop off of the tree they're on. Giving their name also as gliding ants. The species is native in Jamaica, the specimen that lead to its discovery was found in Kingston Their larger and flatter legs, a trait common with other members of the genus Cephalotes, gives them their gliding abilities.

The species was first given a description and a classification in 1922 by Swiss entomologist Auguste Forel.
