= Cephalotes cristatus =

Scientific classification
- Domain: Eukaryota
- Kingdom: Animalia
- Phylum: Arthropoda
- Class: Insecta
- Order: Hymenoptera
- Family: Formicidae
- Subfamily: Myrmicinae
- Genus: Cephalotes
- Species: C. cristatus

Binomial name
- Cephalotes cristatus (Emery, 1890)

Species of ant

Cephalotes cristatus is a species of arboreal ant of the genus Cephalotes, characterized by an odd shaped head and the ability to "parachute" by steering their fall if they drop off of the tree they are on. Giving their name also as gliding ants.

The major components of the mandibular gland secretion of C. cristatus are 4-hepanone and 4-heptanol. Ant alarm pheromones from mandibular gland secretions usually results in an aggressive behaviour. However, ants of the genus Cephalotes are usually unaggressive and use a submissive defences, that includes stopping and lying flat on the surface when alarmed. When worker of C. cristatus were exposed to crushed ant heads, 4-heptanone, 4-heptanol, or a mixture of these chemicals, they assumed a non-aggressive response.
