= Cephalotes porrasi =

Scientific classification
- Domain: Eukaryota
- Kingdom: Animalia
- Phylum: Arthropoda
- Class: Insecta
- Order: Hymenoptera
- Family: Formicidae
- Subfamily: Myrmicinae
- Genus: Cephalotes
- Species: C. porrasi

Binomial name
- Cephalotes porrasi (Wheeler, 1942)

Species of ant

Cephalotes porrasi is a species of arboreal ant of the genus Cephalotes, from central America. The soldier caste has the upper part of its head shaped like a disk. The worker caste has the ability to "parachute" by steering its fall if it drops off a tree, leading the ants to also have been classified as gliding ants.
