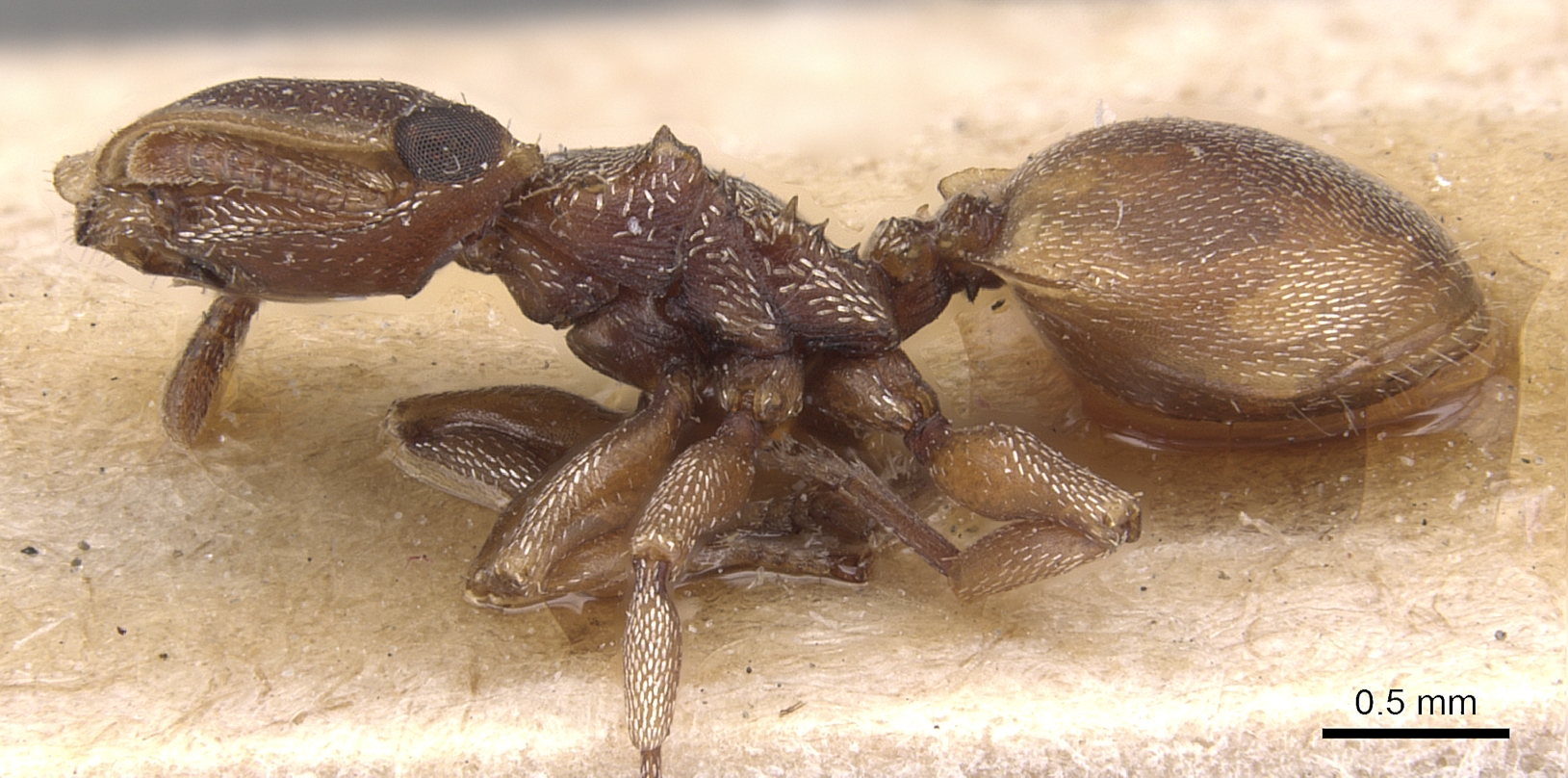
- Holotype worker

Scientific classification
- Domain: Eukaryota
- Kingdom: Animalia
- Phylum: Arthropoda
- Class: Insecta
- Order: Hymenoptera
- Family: Formicidae
- Subfamily: Myrmicinae
- Genus: Cephalotes
- Species: C. adolphi

Binomial name
- Cephalotes adolphi (Emery, 1906)

= Cephalotes adolphi =

Species of ant

Cephalotes adolphi is a species of arboreal ant of the genus Cephalotes, characterized by an odd shaped head and the ability to "parachute" by steering their fall if they drop off of the tree they're on. Also known as gliding ants. The species is native of Peru and of the Brazilian states of Goiás, Mato Grosso and Minas Gerais. Their larger and flatter legs, a trait common with other members of the genus Cephalotes, gives them their gliding abilities.
