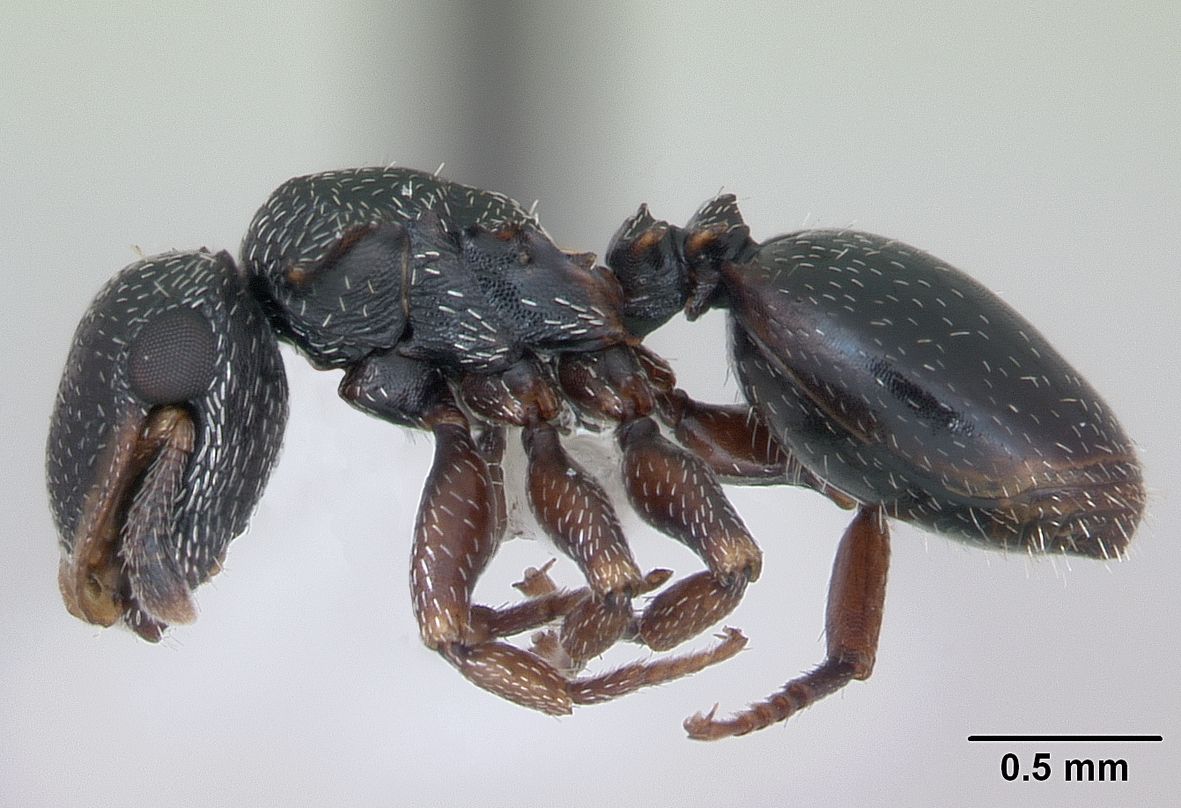
- Cephalotes guayaki worker

Scientific classification
- Domain: Eukaryota
- Kingdom: Animalia
- Phylum: Arthropoda
- Class: Insecta
- Order: Hymenoptera
- Family: Formicidae
- Subfamily: Myrmicinae
- Genus: Cephalotes
- Species: C. guayaki

Binomial name
- Cephalotes guayaki De Andrade, 1999

= Cephalotes guayaki =

Species of ant

Cephalotes guayaki is a species of arboreal ant of the genus Cephalotes, characterized by an odd shaped head and the ability to "parachute" by steering their fall if they drop off of the tree they're on. As such they are considered one of the gliding ants. The species is native across the north of South America, from the Brazilian state of Mato Grosso in the north to Paraguay in the south. Their larger and flatter legs, a trait common with other members of the genus Cephalotes, gives them their gliding abilities.

The species was first given a description and a classification by Brazilian entomologist Maria de Andrade in 1999.
