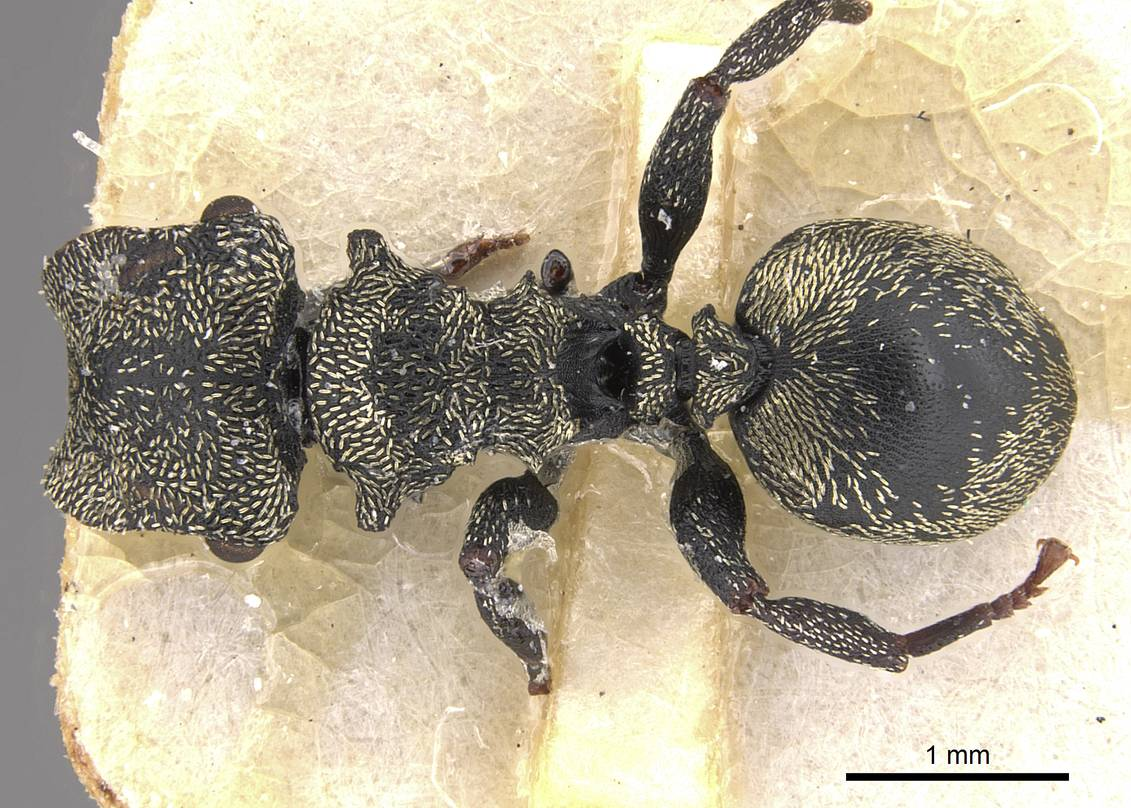

Scientific classification
- Domain: Eukaryota
- Kingdom: Animalia
- Phylum: Arthropoda
- Class: Insecta
- Order: Hymenoptera
- Family: Formicidae
- Subfamily: Myrmicinae
- Genus: Cephalotes
- Species: C. emeryi

Binomial name
- Cephalotes emeryi (Forel, 1912)

= Cephalotes emeryi =

Species of ant

Cephalotes emeryi is a species of arboreal ant of the genus Cephalotes, characterized by an odd shaped head and the ability to "parachute" by steering their fall if they drop off of the tree they're on. Giving their name also as gliding ants.
