= Cephalotes frigidus =

Scientific classification
- Domain: Eukaryota
- Kingdom: Animalia
- Phylum: Arthropoda
- Class: Insecta
- Order: Hymenoptera
- Family: Formicidae
- Subfamily: Myrmicinae
- Genus: Cephalotes
- Species: C. frigidus

Binomial name
- Cephalotes frigidus (Kempf, 1960)

Species of ant

Cephalotes frigidus is a species of arboreal ant of the genus Cephalotes. They are characterized by an odd shaped head and the ability to "parachute" by steering their fall if they drop off of the tree they are on. As a result, they are also called gliding ants.
