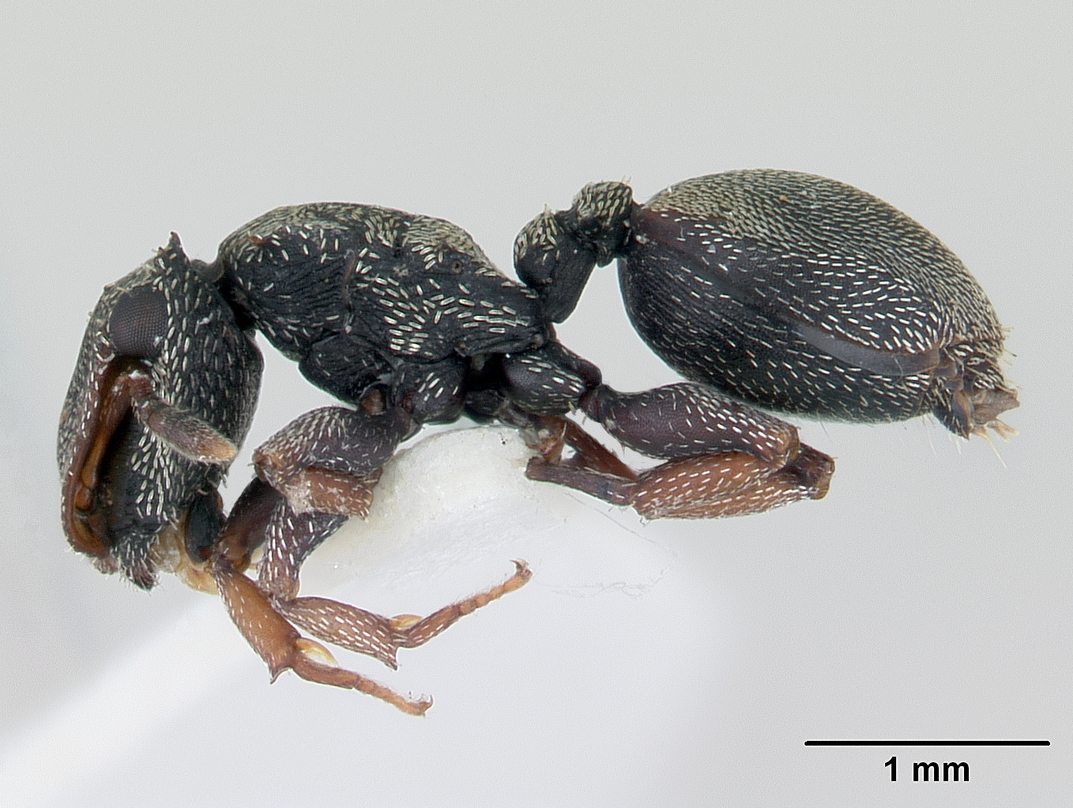
- Cephalotes crenaticeps worker

Scientific classification
- Domain: Eukaryota
- Kingdom: Animalia
- Phylum: Arthropoda
- Class: Insecta
- Order: Hymenoptera
- Family: Formicidae
- Subfamily: Myrmicinae
- Genus: Cephalotes
- Species: C. crenaticeps

Binomial name
- Cephalotes crenaticeps (Mayr, 1866)

= Cephalotes crenaticeps =

Species of ant

Cephalotes crenaticeps is a species of arboreal ant of the genus Cephalotes, characterized by an odd shaped head and the ability to "parachute" by steering their fall if they drop off of the tree they're on. Giving their name also as gliding ants.
