= Cephalotes hirsutus =

Scientific classification
- Domain: Eukaryota
- Kingdom: Animalia
- Phylum: Arthropoda
- Class: Insecta
- Order: Hymenoptera
- Family: Formicidae
- Subfamily: Myrmicinae
- Genus: Cephalotes
- Species: C. hirsutus

Binomial name
- Cephalotes hirsutus De Andrade, 1999

Species of ant

Cephalotes hirsutus is a species of arboreal ant of the genus Cephalotes, characterized by an odd shaped head and the ability to "parachute" by steering their fall if they drop off of the tree they're on. Giving their name also as gliding ants. The species is native of Mexico, especially of the state of Sinaloa and the vicinity of the city of Morelia. Their larger and flatter legs, a trait common with other members of the genus Cephalotes, gives them their gliding abilities.

The species was first given a description and a classification in 1999 by Brazilian entomologist Maria de Andrade.
