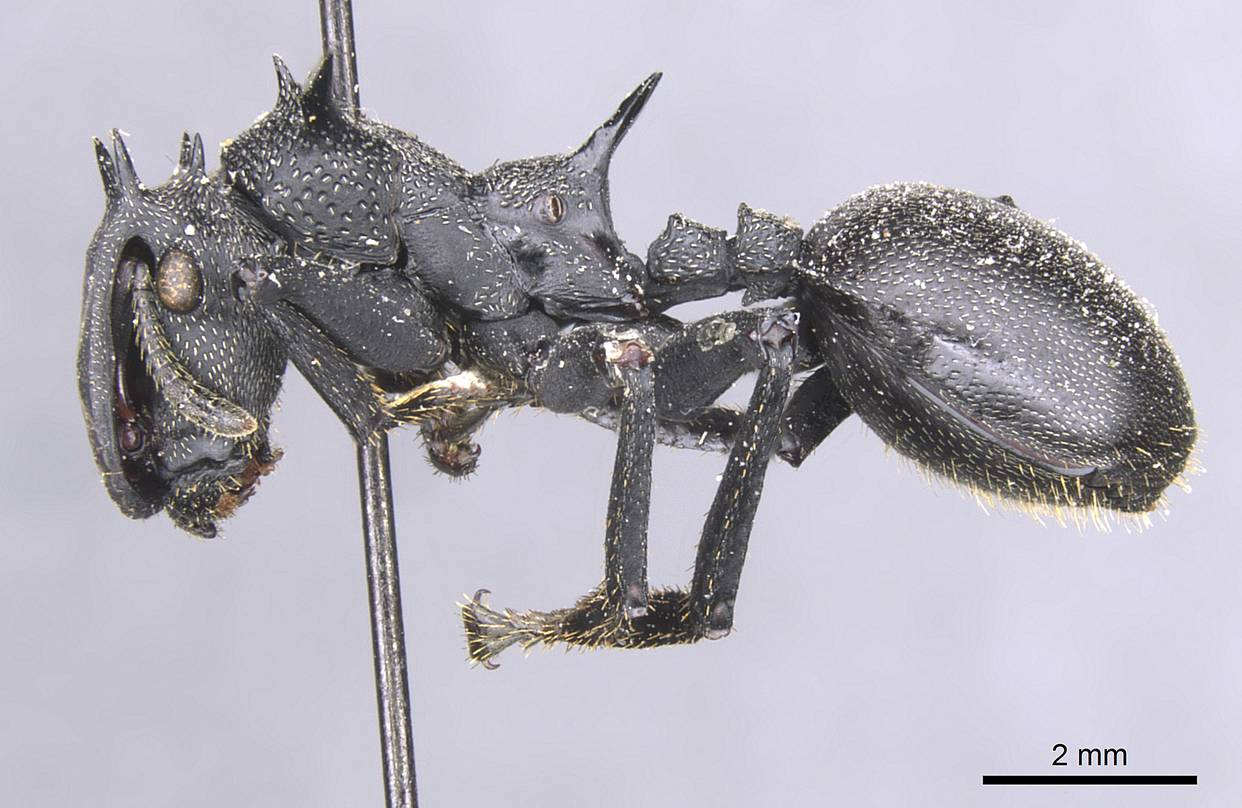

Scientific classification
- Kingdom: Animalia
- Phylum: Arthropoda
- Clade: Pancrustacea
- Class: Insecta
- Order: Hymenoptera
- Family: Formicidae
- Subfamily: Myrmicinae
- Genus: Cephalotes
- Species: C. marginatus

Binomial name
- Cephalotes marginatus (Fabricius, 1804)

= Cephalotes marginatus =

Species of ant

Cephalotes marginatus is a species of arboreal ant of the genus Cephalotes, characterized by an odd shaped head and the ability to "parachute" by steering their fall if they drop off of the tree they're on. Giving their name also as gliding ants. The species is native of the northern half of South America, especially Amazon basin, Ecuador and Colombia. Their larger and flatter legs, a trait common with other members of the genus Cephalotes, gives them their gliding abilities.

The species was first given a description and a classification in 1804 by Danish entomologist Johan Christian Fabricius.
