= Cephalotes supercilii =

Scientific classification
- Domain: Eukaryota
- Kingdom: Animalia
- Phylum: Arthropoda
- Class: Insecta
- Order: Hymenoptera
- Family: Formicidae
- Subfamily: Myrmicinae
- Genus: Cephalotes
- Species: C. supercilii

Binomial name
- Cephalotes supercilii De Andrade, 1999

Species of ant

Cephalotes supercilii is a species of arboreal ant of the genus Cephalotes, characterized by an odd shaped head and the ability to "parachute" by steering their fall if they drop off of a tree. Giving their name also as gliding ants.
