= Cephalotes chacmul =

Scientific classification
- Kingdom: Animalia
- Phylum: Arthropoda
- Class: Insecta
- Order: Hymenoptera
- Family: Formicidae
- Subfamily: Myrmicinae
- Genus: Cephalotes
- Species: C. chacmul

Binomial name
- Cephalotes chacmul Snelling, 1999

Species of ant

Cephalotes chacmul is a species of arboreal ant of the genus Cephalotes, characterized by an odd shaped head and the ability to "parachute" by steering their fall if they drop off of the tree they are on. Due to this, their common name also is known as gliding ants.
