= Cephalotes argentiventris =

Scientific classification
- Domain: Eukaryota
- Kingdom: Animalia
- Phylum: Arthropoda
- Class: Insecta
- Order: Hymenoptera
- Family: Formicidae
- Subfamily: Myrmicinae
- Genus: Cephalotes
- Species: C. argentiventris

Binomial name
- Cephalotes argentiventris De Andrade, 1999

Species of ant

Cephalotes argentiventris is a species of arboreal ant of the genus Cephalotes, characterized by an odd shaped head and the ability to "parachute" by steering their fall if they drop off of the tree they're on (a behavior known as directed aerial descent or DAD), giving their name also as gliding ants.
