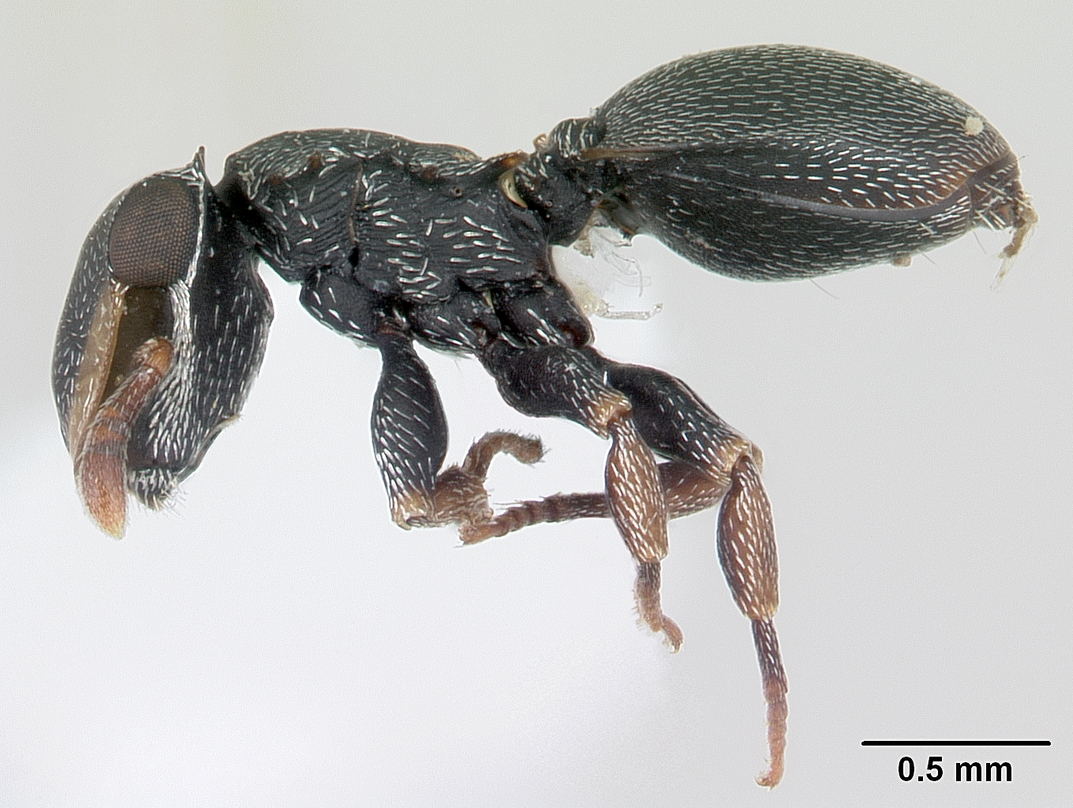
- Cephalotes minutus worker

Scientific classification
- Domain: Eukaryota
- Kingdom: Animalia
- Phylum: Arthropoda
- Class: Insecta
- Order: Hymenoptera
- Family: Formicidae
- Subfamily: Myrmicinae
- Genus: Cephalotes
- Species: C. minutus

Binomial name
- Cephalotes minutus (Fabricius, 1804)

= Cephalotes minutus =

Species of ant

Cephalotes minutus is a species of arboreal ant of the genus Cephalotes, characterized by an odd shaped head and the ability to "parachute" by steering their fall if they drop off of the tree they were on. Giving their name also as gliding ants. The species is native of a large part of Central and South America, from the Argentinian region of Corrientes in the south, to the Mexican state of Tamaulipas, even to the American state of Texas in the north, making it one of the species with the largest native area of its genus. Their larger and flatter legs, a trait common with other members of the genus Cephalotes, gives them their gliding abilities.

The species was first given a description and a classification in 1804 by Danish entomologist Johan Christian Fabricius, and Cephalotes minutus is part of his classification, which is the first modern classification of insects.
