= Cephalotes pallidus =

Scientific classification
- Domain: Eukaryota
- Kingdom: Animalia
- Phylum: Arthropoda
- Class: Insecta
- Order: Hymenoptera
- Family: Formicidae
- Subfamily: Myrmicinae
- Genus: Cephalotes
- Species: C. pallidus

Binomial name
- Cephalotes pallidus De Andrade, 1999

Species of ant

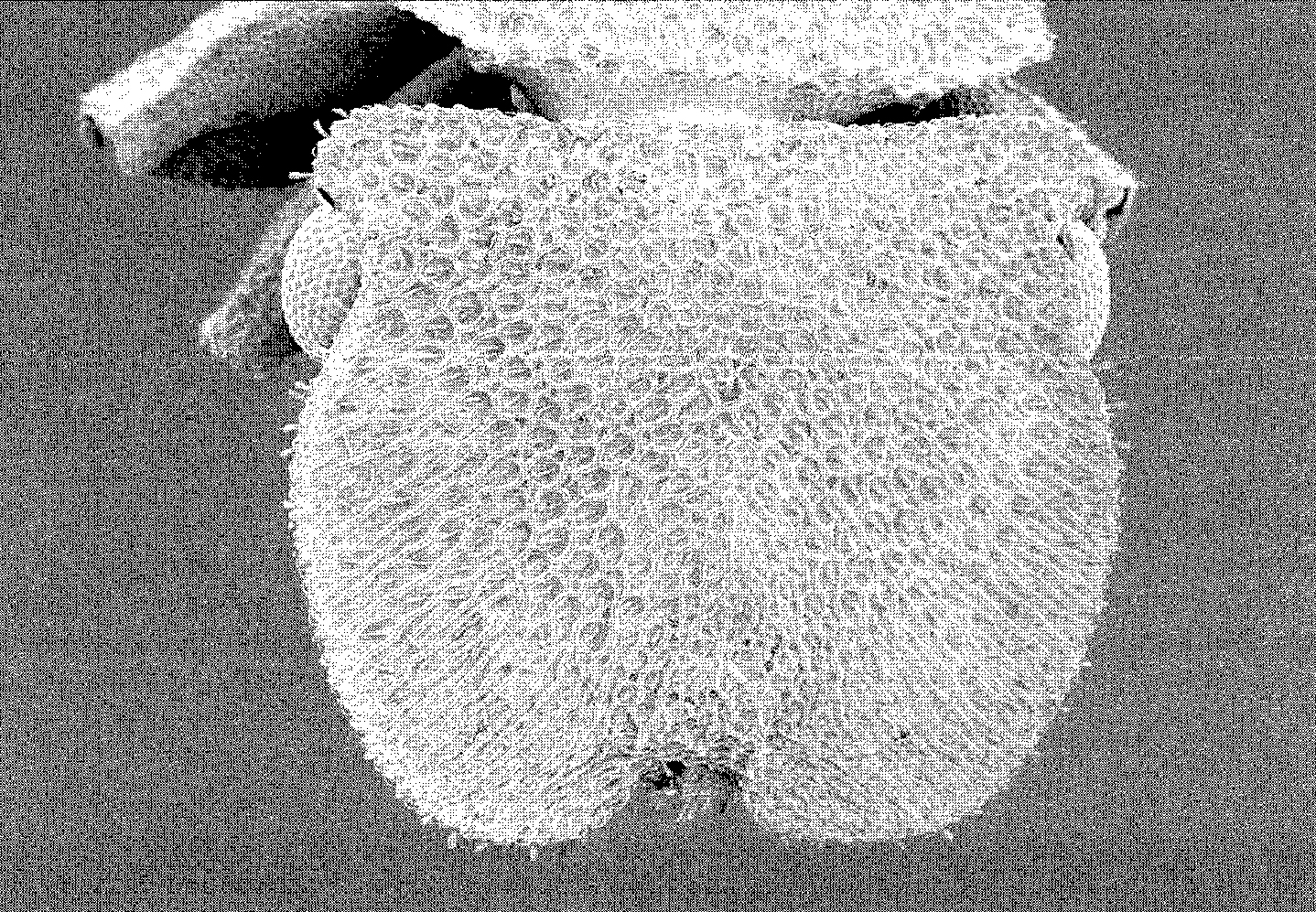
Head of Cephalotes pallidus

Cephalotes pallidus is a species of arboreal ant of the genus Cephalotes, characterized by an odd shaped head, and the ability to "parachute" by steering their fall if they drop from a tree - a characteristic also contributing to their name as gliding ants.
