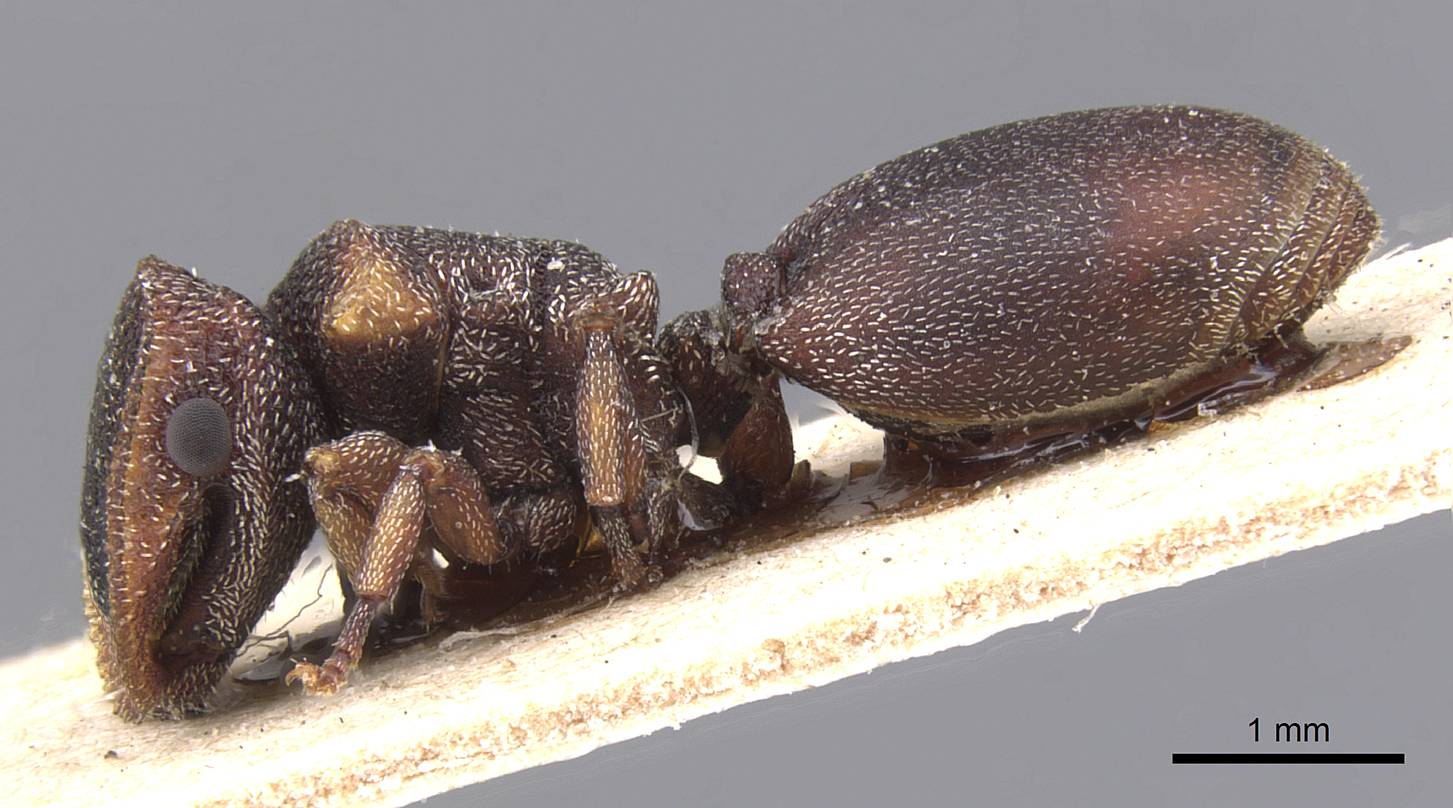

Scientific classification
- Domain: Eukaryota
- Kingdom: Animalia
- Phylum: Arthropoda
- Class: Insecta
- Order: Hymenoptera
- Family: Formicidae
- Subfamily: Myrmicinae
- Genus: Cephalotes
- Species: C. fossithorax

Binomial name
- Cephalotes fossithorax (Santschi, 1921)

= Cephalotes fossithorax =

Species of ant

Cephalotes fossithorax is a species of arboreal ant of the genus Cephalotes, characterized by an odd shaped head and the ability to "parachute" by steering during a fall. See also gliding ants. The species was originally reported as Cryptocerus fossithorax in 1921, a name which is now obsolete.
