= Cephalotes bivestitus =

Scientific classification
- Domain: Eukaryota
- Kingdom: Animalia
- Phylum: Arthropoda
- Class: Insecta
- Order: Hymenoptera
- Family: Formicidae
- Subfamily: Myrmicinae
- Genus: Cephalotes
- Species: C. bivestitus

Binomial name
- Cephalotes bivestitus (Santschi, 1922)

Species of ant

Cephalotes bivestitus is a species of arboreal ant of the genus Cephalotes, characterized by an odd shaped head and the ability to "parachute" by steering their fall if they drop off of the tree they're on, thus they are known also as gliding ants.
