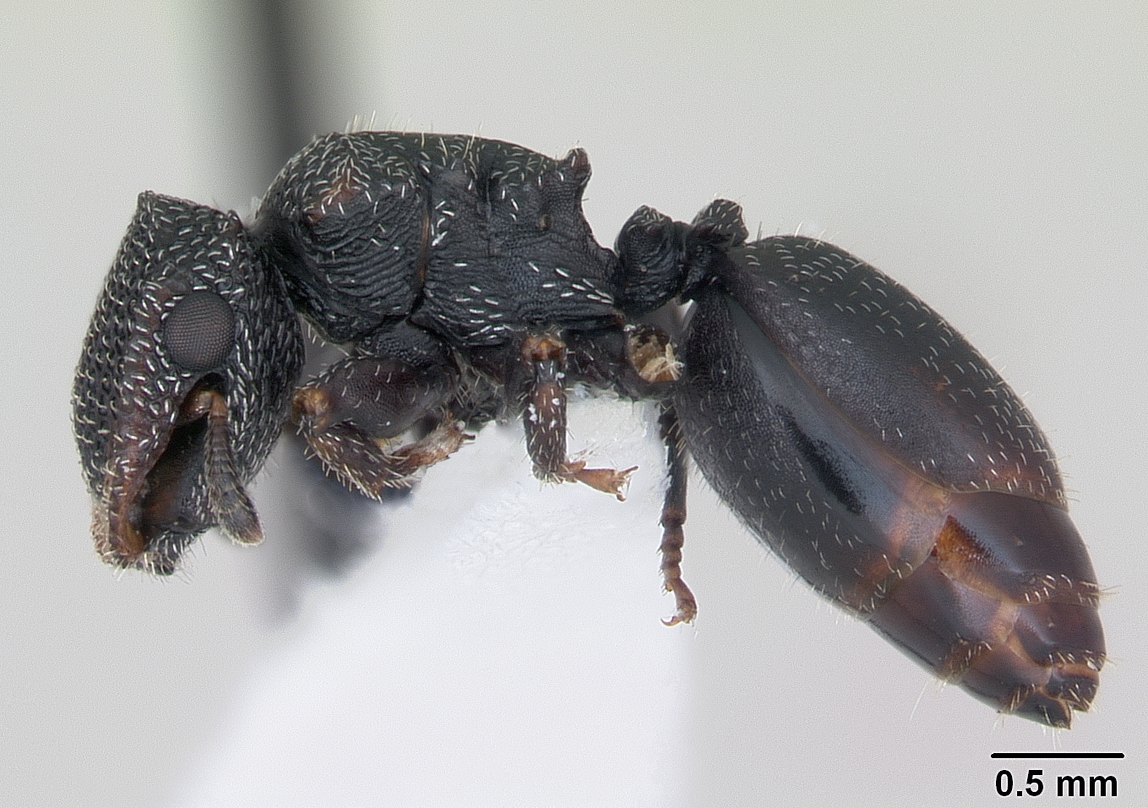
- Cephalotes fiebrigi worker

Scientific classification
- Domain: Eukaryota
- Kingdom: Animalia
- Phylum: Arthropoda
- Class: Insecta
- Order: Hymenoptera
- Family: Formicidae
- Subfamily: Myrmicinae
- Genus: Cephalotes
- Species: C. fiebrigi

Binomial name
- Cephalotes fiebrigi (Forel, 1906)

= Cephalotes fiebrigi =

Species of ant

Cephalotes fiebrigi is a species of arboreal ant of the genus Cephalotes, characterized by an odd shaped head and the ability to "parachute" by steering their fall if they drop off of the tree they're on. Also known as gliding ants.
