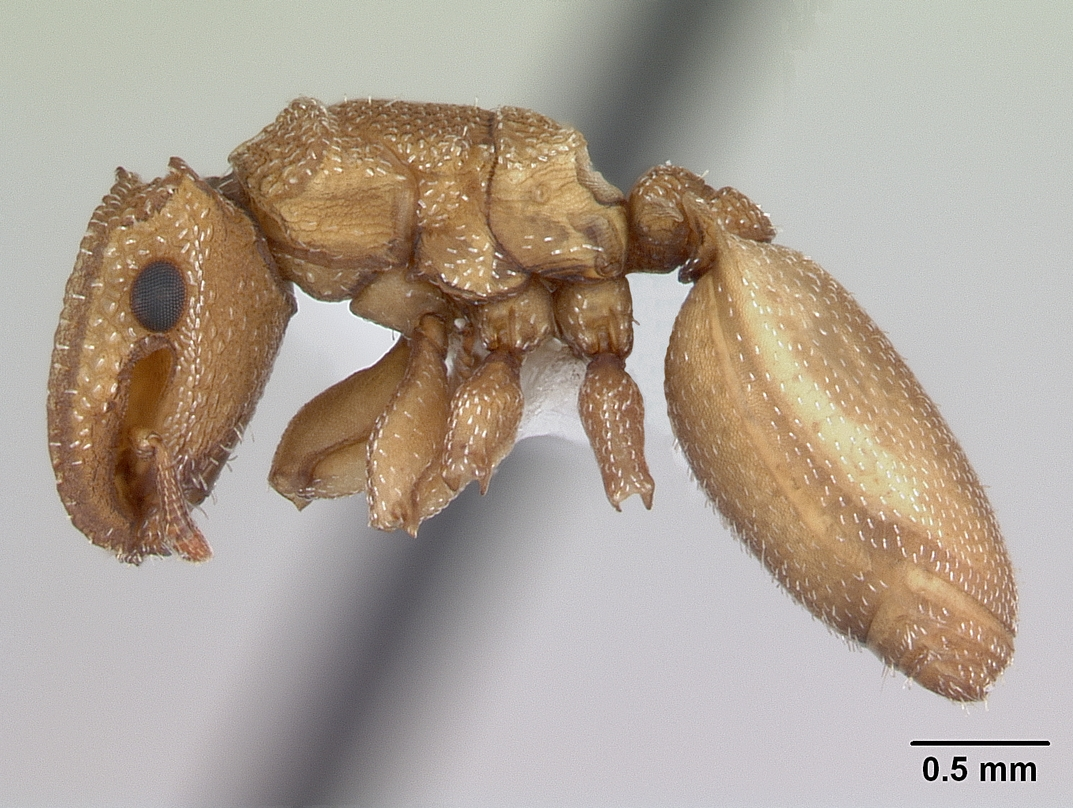
- Cephalotes grandinosus worker

Scientific classification
- Domain: Eukaryota
- Kingdom: Animalia
- Phylum: Arthropoda
- Class: Insecta
- Order: Hymenoptera
- Family: Formicidae
- Subfamily: Myrmicinae
- Genus: Cephalotes
- Species: C. grandinosus

Binomial name
- Cephalotes grandinosus (Smith, 1860)

= Cephalotes grandinosus =

Species of ant

Cephalotes grandinosus is a species of arboreal ant of the genus Cephalotes, characterized by an odd shaped head and the ability to "parachute" by steering their fall if they drop from the tree they are on, giving their name also as gliding ants.
