= Cephalotes prodigiosus =

Scientific classification
- Domain: Eukaryota
- Kingdom: Animalia
- Phylum: Arthropoda
- Class: Insecta
- Order: Hymenoptera
- Family: Formicidae
- Subfamily: Myrmicinae
- Genus: Cephalotes
- Species: C. prodigiosus

Binomial name
- Cephalotes prodigiosus (Santschi, 1921)

Species of ant

Cephalotes prodigiosus is a species of arboreal ant of the genus Cephalotes, characterized by an odd shaped head and the ability to "parachute" by steering their fall if they drop off the tree they're on, giving them the name of gliding ants as well.
