= Cephalotes inaequalis =

Scientific classification
- Domain: Eukaryota
- Kingdom: Animalia
- Phylum: Arthropoda
- Class: Insecta
- Order: Hymenoptera
- Family: Formicidae
- Subfamily: Myrmicinae
- Genus: Cephalotes
- Species: C. inaequalis

Binomial name
- Cephalotes inaequalis (Mann, 1916)

Species of ant

Cephalotes inaequalis is a species of arboreal ant of the genus Cephalotes, characterized by an odd shaped head and the ability to "parachute" by steering their fall if they drop off of the tree they're on. Giving their name also as gliding ants.

== Distribution ==
Colombia, Guyana, and Brazil.
