= Cephalotes complanatus =

Scientific classification
- Kingdom: Animalia
- Phylum: Arthropoda
- Clade: Pancrustacea
- Class: Insecta
- Order: Hymenoptera
- Family: Formicidae
- Subfamily: Myrmicinae
- Genus: Cephalotes
- Species: C. complanatus

Binomial name
- Cephalotes complanatus (Guerin-Meneville, 1844)

Species of ant

Cephalotes complanatus is a species of arboreal ant of the genus Cephalotes, characterized by an odd shaped head, and the ability to "parachute" by steering their fall if they drop off of the tree they're on. Giving their name also as gliding ants.

It was first identified and classified by the French entomologist Félix Édouard Guérin-Méneville, in 1844.
