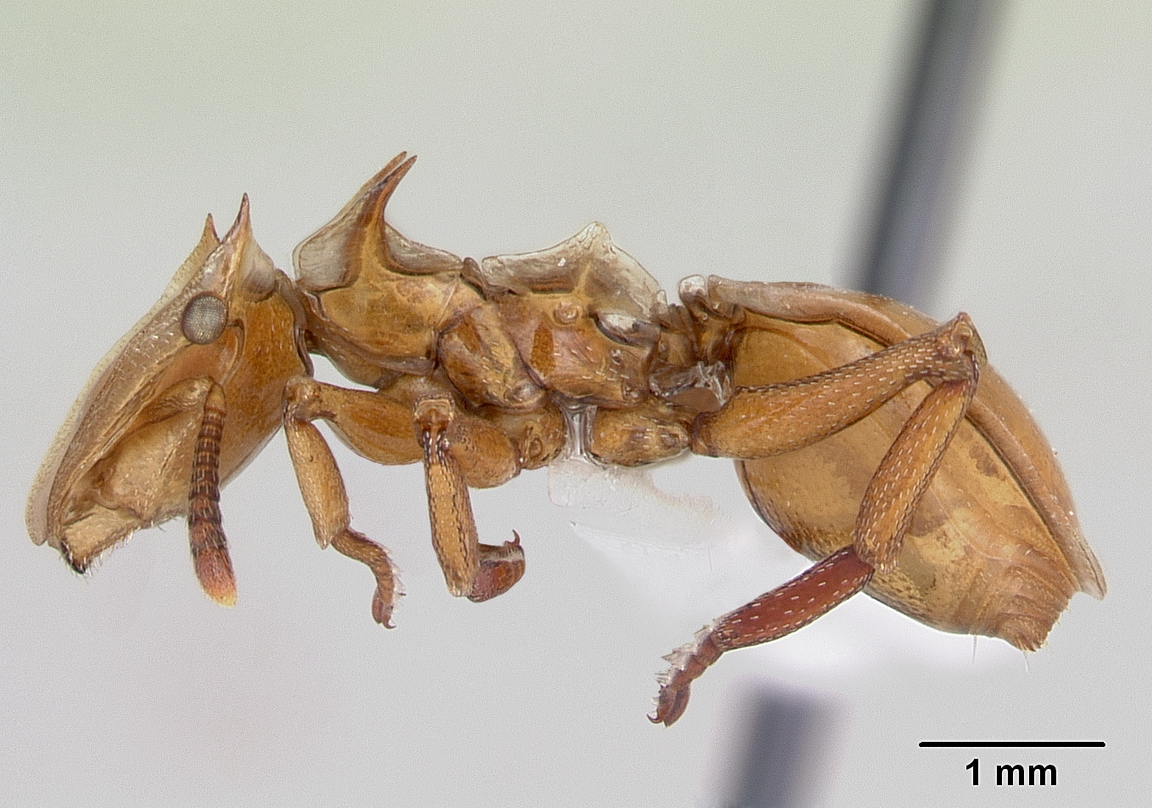
- Cephalotes clypeatus worker

Scientific classification
- Domain: Eukaryota
- Kingdom: Animalia
- Phylum: Arthropoda
- Class: Insecta
- Order: Hymenoptera
- Family: Formicidae
- Subfamily: Myrmicinae
- Genus: Cephalotes
- Species: C. clypeatus

Binomial name
- Cephalotes clypeatus (Fabricius, 1804)

= Cephalotes clypeatus =

Species of ant

Cephalotes clypeatus is a species of arboreal ant of the genus Cephalotes, characterized by an odd shaped head and the ability to "parachute" by steering their fall if they drop off of the tree they're on. This ability has given them the name gliding ants.
