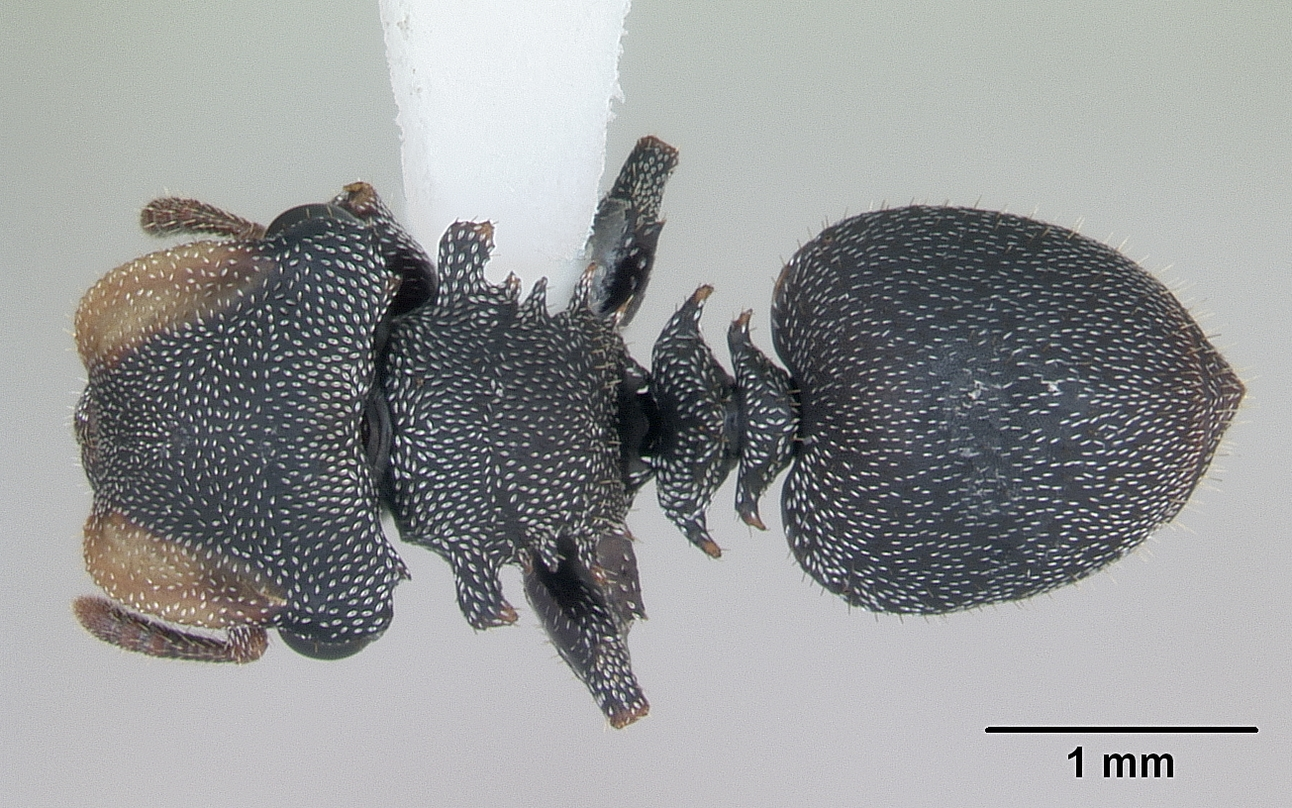
- Cephalotes eduarduli worker

Scientific classification
- Kingdom: Animalia
- Phylum: Arthropoda
- Clade: Pancrustacea
- Class: Insecta
- Order: Hymenoptera
- Family: Formicidae
- Subfamily: Myrmicinae
- Genus: Cephalotes
- Species: C. eduarduli

Binomial name
- Cephalotes eduarduli (Forel, 1921)

= Cephalotes eduarduli =

Species of ant

Cephalotes eduarduli is a species of arboreal ant of the genus Cephalotes, characterized by an oddly shaped head and the ability to "parachute" by steering their fall if they drop off of the tree they're on. Giving their name also as gliding ants.
