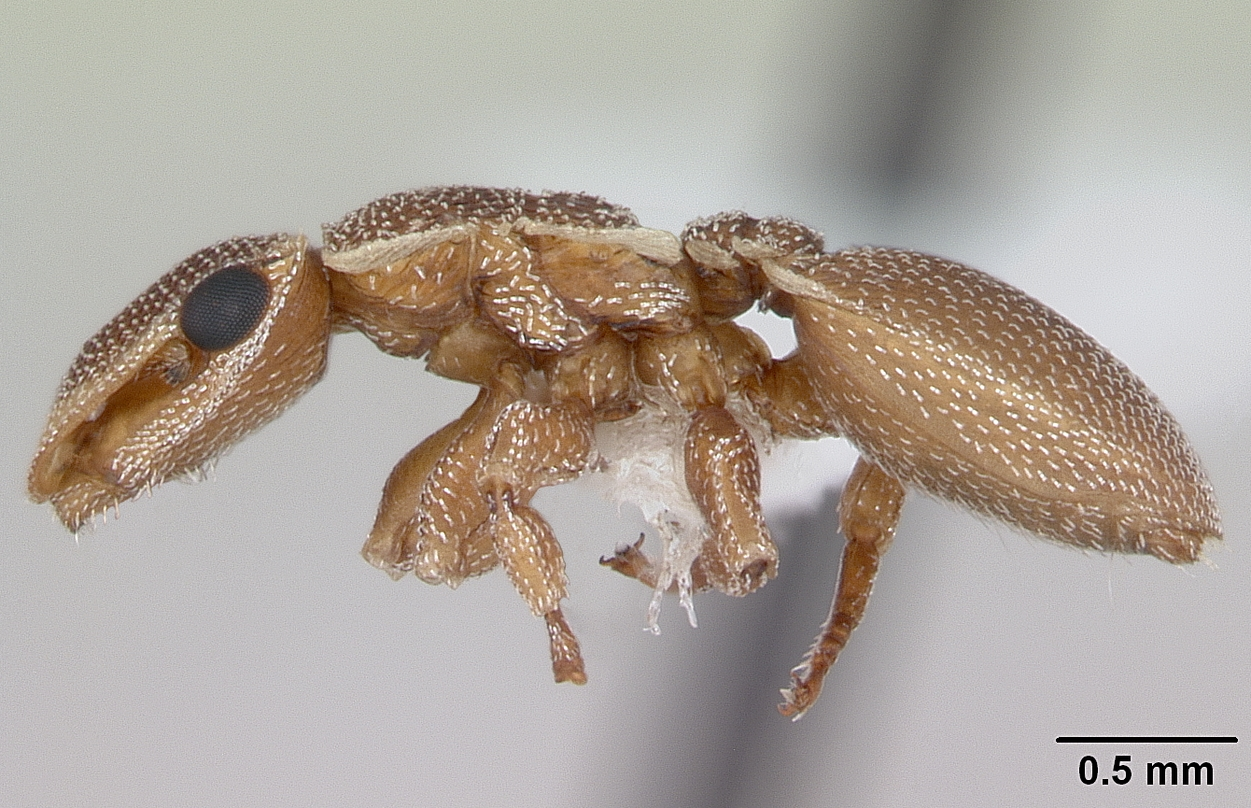
- Cephalotes persimilis worker

Scientific classification
- Domain: Eukaryota
- Kingdom: Animalia
- Phylum: Arthropoda
- Class: Insecta
- Order: Hymenoptera
- Family: Formicidae
- Subfamily: Myrmicinae
- Genus: Cephalotes
- Species: C. persimilis

Binomial name
- Cephalotes persimilis de Andrade, 1999

= Cephalotes persimilis =

Species of ant

Cephalotes persimilis is a species of arboreal ant of the genus Cephalotes, characterized by an odd shaped head, and the ability to "parachute" by steering their fall if they drop off of the tree they're on. Giving their name also as gliding ants.
