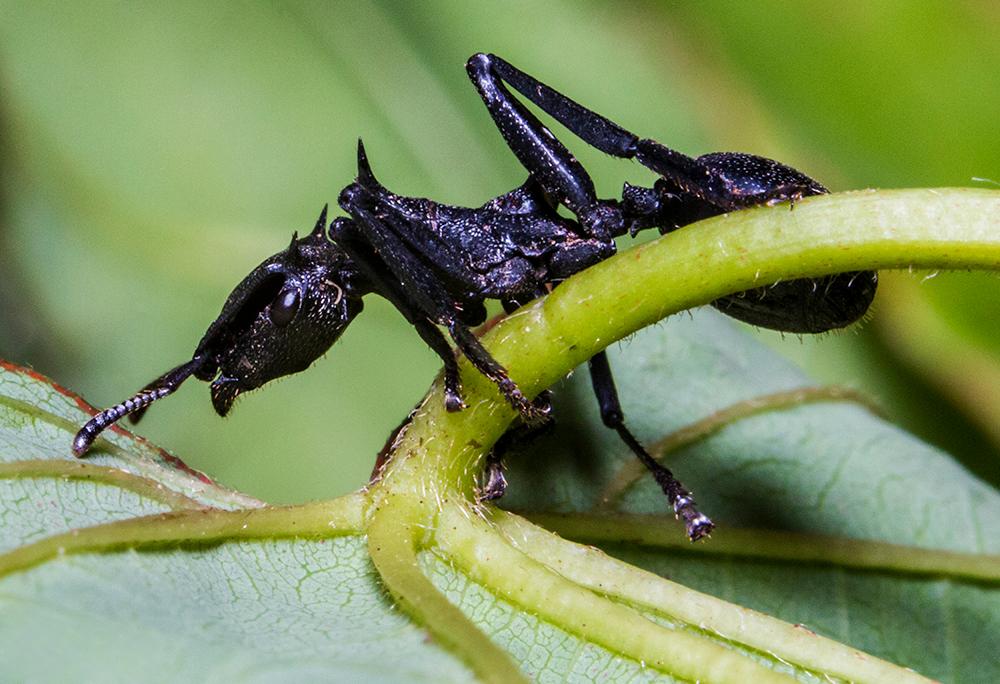
- Cephalotes atratus, Soberania National Park, Panama

Scientific classification
- Kingdom: Animalia
- Phylum: Arthropoda
- Class: Insecta
- Order: Hymenoptera
- Family: Formicidae
- Subfamily: Myrmicinae
- Tribe: Attini
- Genus: Cephalotes; Latreille, 1802

Type species
- Formica atrata Linnaeus, 1758

Diversity
- about 130 species

Synonyms
- Cryptocerus Latreille, 1803; Cyathocephalus Emery, 1915; Cyathomyrmex Creighton, 1933; Eucryptocerus Kempf, 1951; Exocryptocerus Vierbergen & Scheven, 1995; Harnedia Smith, 1949; Hypocryptocerus Wheeler, 1920; Paracryptocerus Emery, 1915; Zacryptocerus Wheeler, 1911

= Cephalotes =

Genus of ants

Cephalotes is a genus of tree-dwelling ant species from the Americas, commonly known as turtle ants. All appear to be gliding ants, with the ability to "parachute" and steer their fall so as to land back on the tree trunk rather than fall to the ground, which is often flooded.

== Ecological specialization and evolution of a soldier caste ==
One of the most important aspects of the genus' social evolution and adaptation is the manner in which their social organization has been shaped by environmental pressures. Because ants within Cephalotes use nesting cavities found in the trees upon which they live, most species have evolved a cohort of morphologically specialized soldiers, which defend these nesting cavities. They use their distinctive plate-like heads to block the entrances to the nests, essentially creating a living door to the nest cavities.

The relationship between soldier head morphology and nest defense has been investigated. Whereas species with less-specialized soldiers engage in both active and passive (blocking) behaviors to defend nests, species with more-specialized soldiers engage in only passive, blocking defense behavior.

Another study by Powell examined the process by which environmental factors shape colonial castes within the worker class. However, this study focused more on how colonies adapt their caste systems to ecological factors in their environment.

For the experiment, a species of the genus Cephalotes was used that displayed the highest level of soldier specialization. Three key findings regarding adaptive caste specialization were supported:

1. Soldiers were best at defending the specific nesting resource found in nature.
2. Colonies used only certain nests (out of all the available nests), and selected only the nesting sites that would maximize soldier performance.
3. Soldier performance and limitations had both direct and indirect effects on colony reproduction.

The results of this experiment support the concept that the most specialized soldier phenotype in Cephalotes is a result of adaptation to ecological specialization within a narrow subset of available nests.

== Species ==
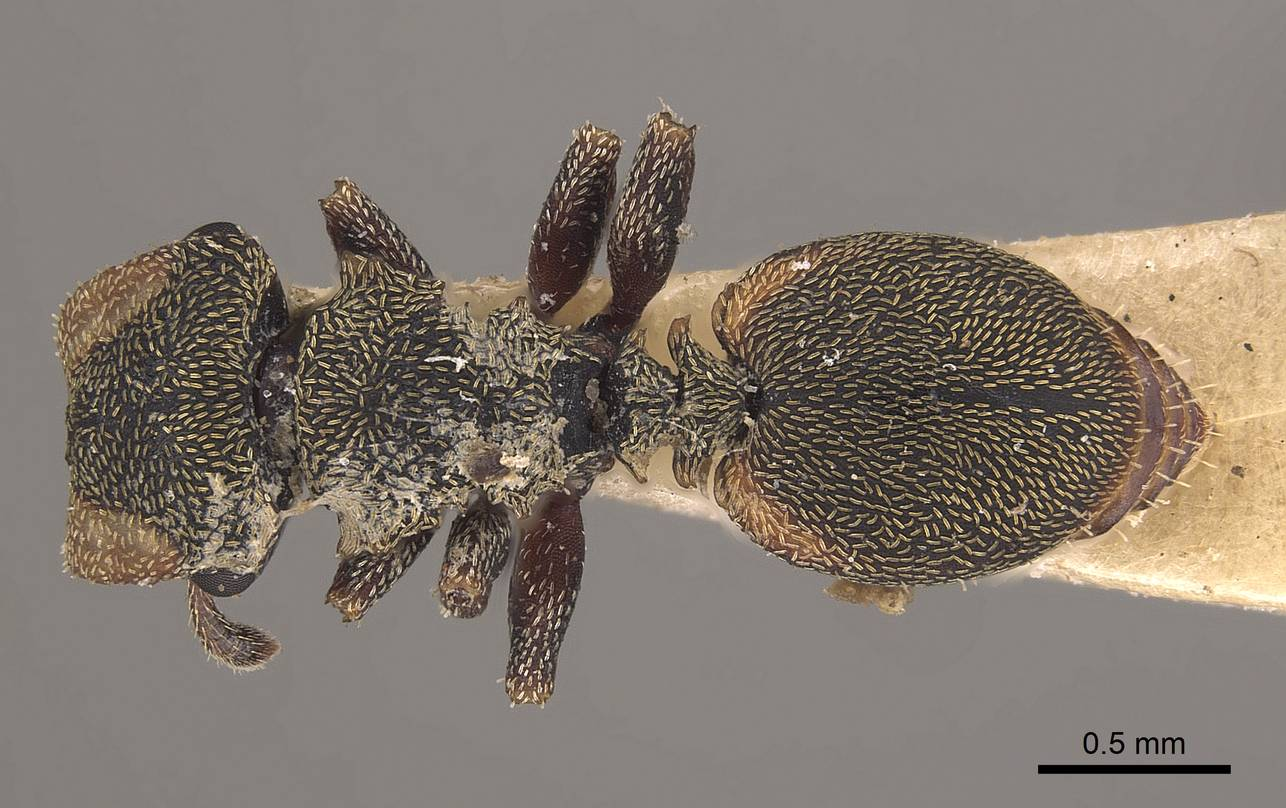
Cephalotes coffeae

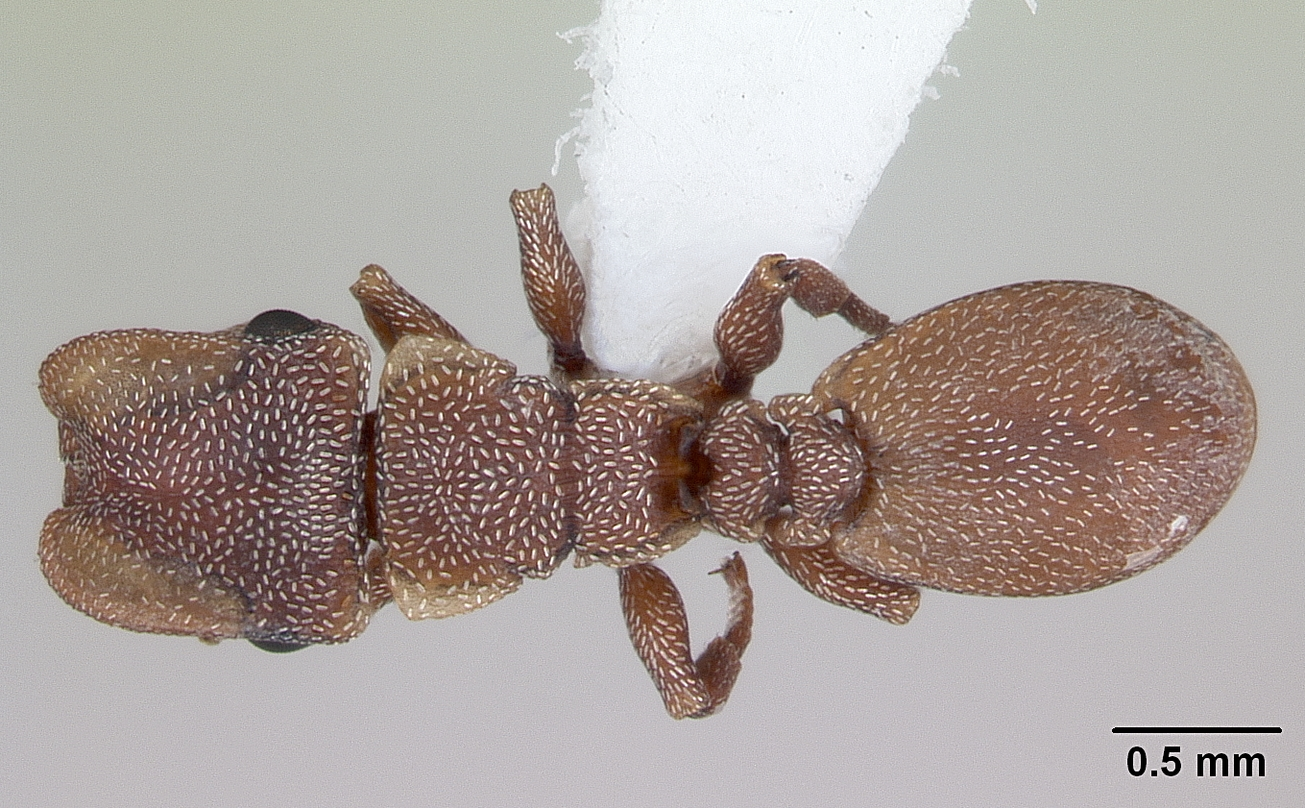
Cephalotes incertus

- Cephalotes adolphi (Emery, 1906)
- Cephalotes alfaroi (Emery, 1890)
- Cephalotes angustus (Mayr, 1862)
- Cephalotes argentatus (Smith, 1853)
- Cephalotes argentiventris De Andrade, 1999
- Cephalotes atratus (Linnaeus, 1758)
- Cephalotes auriger De Andrade, 1999
- Cephalotes basalis (Smith, 1876)
- Cephalotes betoi De Andrade, 1999
- Cephalotes biguttatus (Emery, 1890)
- Cephalotes bimaculatus (Smith, 1860)
- Cephalotes bivestitus (Santschi, 1922)
- Cephalotes bohlsi (Emery, 1896)
- Cephalotes borgmeieri (Kempf, 1951)
- Cephalotes bruchi (Forel, 1912)
- Cephalotes chacmul Snelling, 1999
- Cephalotes christopherseni (Forel, 1912)
- Cephalotes clypeatus (Fabricius, 1804)
- Cephalotes coffeae (Kempf, 1953)
- Cephalotes columbicus (Forel, 1912)
- Cephalotes complanatus (Guerin-Meneville, 1844)
- Cephalotes conspersus (Smith, 1867)
- Cephalotes cordatus (Smith, 1853)
- Cephalotes cordiae (Stitz, 1913)
- Cephalotes cordiventris (Santschi, 1931)
- Cephalotes crenaticeps (Mayr, 1866)
- Cephalotes cristatus (Emery, 1890)
- Cephalotes curvistriatus (Forel, 1899)
- Cephalotes decolor De Andrade, 1999
- Cephalotes decoloratus De Andrade, 1999
- Cephalotes dentidorsum De Andrade, 1999
- Cephalotes depressus (Klug, 1824)
- Cephalotes dorbignyanus (Smith, 1853)
- Cephalotes duckei (Forel, 1906)
- Cephalotes ecuadorialis De Andrade, 1999
- Cephalotes eduarduli (Forel, 1921)
- Cephalotes emeryi (Forel, 1912)
- Cephalotes fiebrigi (Forel, 1906)
- Cephalotes flavigaster De Andrade, 1999
- Cephalotes foliaceus (Emery, 1906)
- Cephalotes fossithorax (Santschi, 1921)
- Cephalotes frigidus (Kempf, 1960)
- Cephalotes gabicamacho Oliveira, Powell & Feitosa, 2021
- Cephalotes goeldii (Forel, 1912)
- Cephalotes goniodontes De Andrade, 1999
- Cephalotes grandinosus (Smith, 1860)
- Cephalotes guayaki De Andrade, 1999
- Cephalotes haemorrhoidalis (Latreille, 1802)
- Cephalotes hamulus (Roger, 1863)
- Cephalotes hirsutus De Andrade, 1999
- Cephalotes inaequalis (Mann, 1916)
- Cephalotes inca (Santschi, 1911)
- Cephalotes incertus (Emery, 1906)
- Cephalotes insularis (Wheeler, 1934)
- Cephalotes jamaicensis (Forel, 1922)
- Cephalotes jheringi (Emery, 1894)
- Cephalotes klugi (Emery, 1894)
- Cephalotes kukulcan Snelling, 1999
- Cephalotes laminatus (Smith, 1860)
- Cephalotes lanuginosus (Santschi, 1919)
- Cephalotes lenca De Andrade, 1999
- Cephalotes liepini De Andrade, 1999
- Cephalotes liogaster (Santschi, 1916)
- Cephalotes liviaprado Oliveira, Powell & Feitosa, 2021
- Cephalotes maculatus (Smith, 1876)
- Cephalotes manni (Kempf, 1951)
- Cephalotes marginatus (Fabricius, 1804)
- Cephalotes mariadeandrade Oliveira, Powell & Feitosa, 2021
- Cephalotes marycorn Oliveira, Powell & Feitosa, 2021
- Cephalotes membranaceus (Klug, 1824)
- Cephalotes minutus (Fabricius, 1804)
- Cephalotes mompox De Andrade, 1999
- Cephalotes monicaulyssea Oliveira, Powell & Feitosa, 2021
- Cephalotes multispinosus (Norton, 1868)
- Cephalotes nilpiei De Andrade, 1999
- Cephalotes notatus (Mayr, 1866)
- Cephalotes oculatus (Spinola, 1851)
- Cephalotes opacus Santschi, 1920
- Cephalotes pallens (Klug, 1824)
- Cephalotes pallidicephalus (Smith, 1876)
- Cephalotes pallidoides De Andrade, 1999
- Cephalotes pallidus De Andrade, 1999
- Cephalotes palta De Andrade, 1999
- Cephalotes palustris De Andrade, 1999
- Cephalotes patei (Kempf, 1951)
- Cephalotes patellaris (Mayr, 1866)
- Cephalotes pavonii (Latreille, 1809)
- Cephalotes pellans De Andrade, 1999
- Cephalotes persimilis De Andrade, 1999
- Cephalotes persimplex De Andrade, 1999
- Cephalotes peruviensis De Andrade, 1999
- Cephalotes pileini De Andrade, 1999
- Cephalotes pilosus (Emery, 1896)
- Cephalotes pinelii (Guerin-Meneville, 1844)
- Cephalotes placidus (Smith, 1860)
- Cephalotes porrasi (Wheeler, 1942)
- Cephalotes prodigiosus (Santschi, 1921)
- Cephalotes pusillus (Klug, 1824)
- Cephalotes quadratus (Mayr, 1868)
- Cephalotes ramiphilus (Forel, 1904)
- Cephalotes rohweri (Wheeler, 1916)
- Cephalotes scutulatus (Smith, 1867)
- Cephalotes serraticeps (Smith, 1858)
- Cephalotes setulifer (Emery, 1894)
- Cephalotes simillimus (Kempf, 1951)
- Cephalotes sobrius (Kempf, 1958)
- Cephalotes solidus (Kempf, 1974)
- Cephalotes specularis Brandão et al., 2014
- Cephalotes spinosus (Mayr, 1862)
- Cephalotes supercilii De Andrade, 1999
- Cephalotes targionii (Emery, 1894)
- Cephalotes texanus (Santschi, 1915)
- Cephalotes toltecus De Andrade, 1999
- Cephalotes trichophorus De Andrade, 1999
- Cephalotes umbraculatus (Fabricius, 1804)
- Cephalotes unimaculatus (Smith, 1853)
- Cephalotes ustus (Kempf, 1973)
- Cephalotes varians (Smith, 1876)
- Cephalotes vinosus (Wheeler, 1936)
- Cephalotes wheeleri (Forel, 1901)

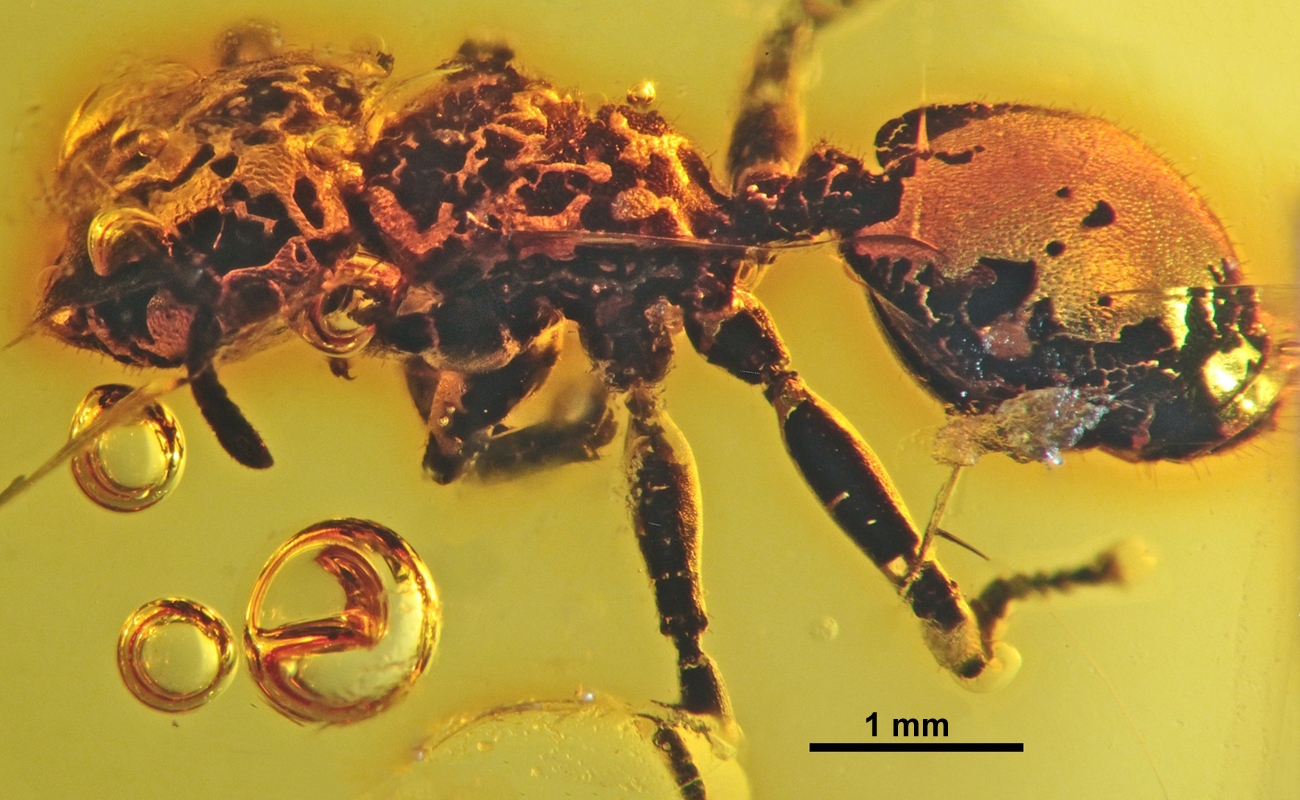
Cephalotes alveolatus

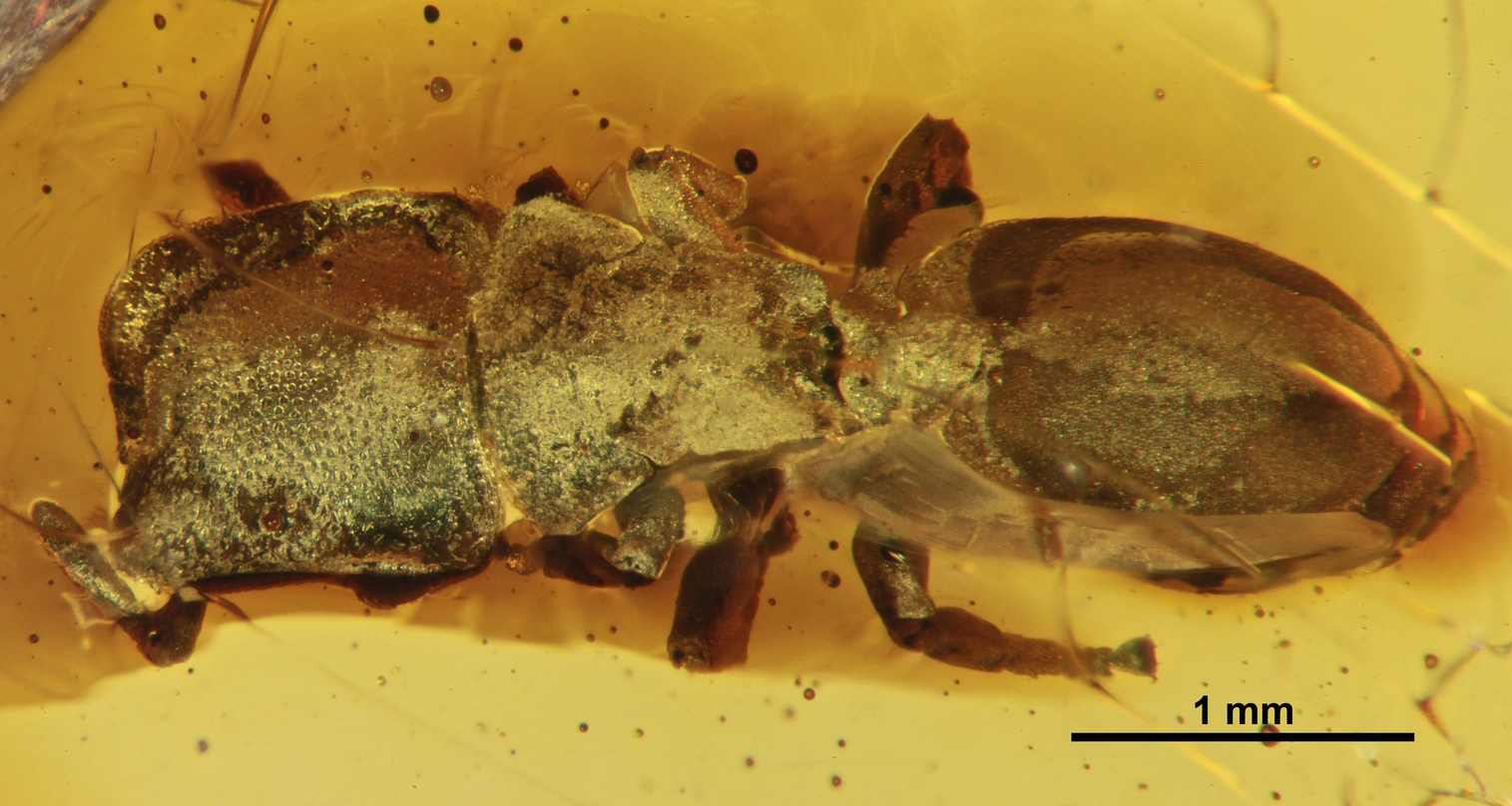
Cephalotes caribicus

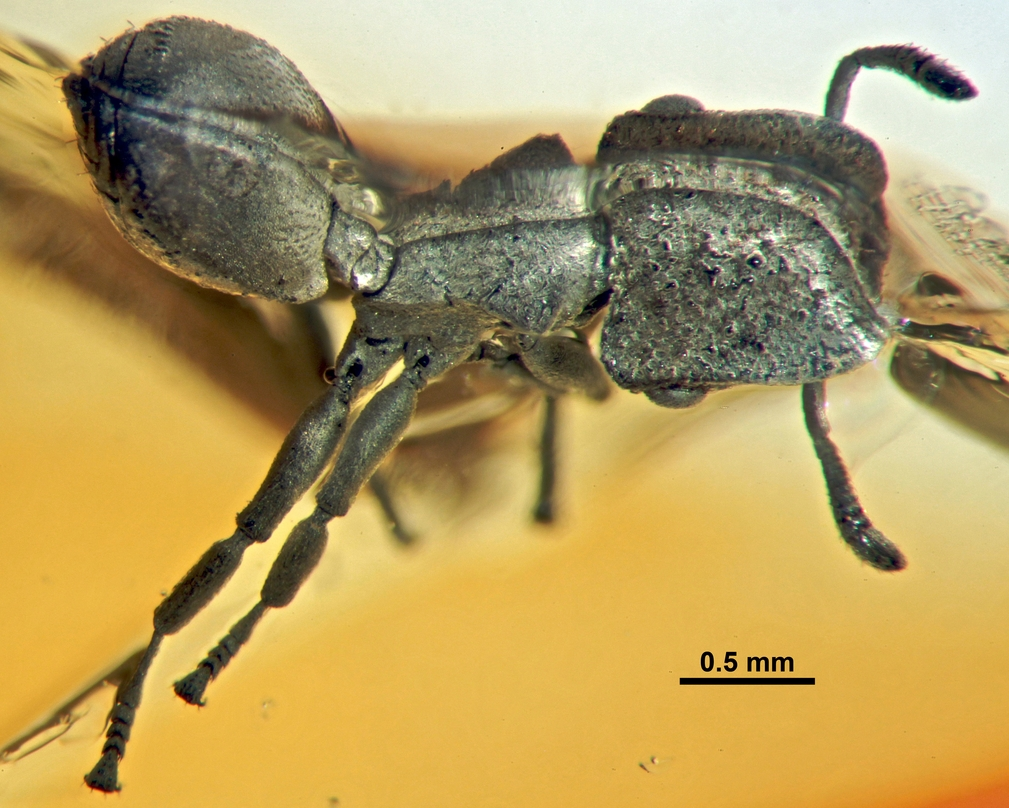
Cephalotes dieteri

=== Fossil species ===
The fossil record is restricted to the Miocene with species recovered from both Dominican and Mexican ambers. Species were initially described by Gijsbertus Vierbergen and Joachim Scheven (1995) whole placed the species into the genera Cephalotes, Eucryptocerus, Exocryptocerus and Zacryptocerus. All four genera were revised four years later by Maria De Andrade and Cesare Baroni Urbani (1999, who synonymized them under Cephalotes. The Dominican amber species:

- †Cephalotes alveolatus (Vierbergen & Scheven, 1995)
- †Cephalotes bloosi Baroni Urbani, 1999
- †Cephalotes brevispineus De Andrade & Baroni Urbani, 1999
- †Cephalotes caribicus De Andrade & Baroni Urbani, 1999
- †Cephalotes dieteri De Andrade & Baroni Urbani, 1999
- †Cephalotes hispaniolicus De Andrade & Baroni Urbani, 1999
- †Cephalotes integerrimus (Vierbergen & Scheven, 1995)
- †Cephalotes jansei (Vierbergen & Scheven, 1995)
- †Cephalotes obscurus (Vierbergen & Scheven, 1995)
- †Cephalotes resinae De Andrade, 1999
- †Cephalotes serratus (Vierbergen & Scheven, 1995)
- †Cephalotes squamosus (Vierbergen & Scheven, 1995)
- †Cephalotes sucinus De Andrade, 1999
- †Cephalotes taino De Andrade, 1999

The Mexican amber species:

- †Cephalotes maya De Andrade, 1999
- †Cephalotes olmecus De Andrade, 1999
- †Cephalotes poinari Baroni Urbani, 1999
- †Cephalotes ventriosus De Andrade, 1999

== See also ==
- Aphantochilus, a genus of crab spiders known to mimic Cephalotes species
