= Mirror turtle ant =

Scientific classification
- Domain: Eukaryota
- Kingdom: Animalia
- Phylum: Arthropoda
- Class: Insecta
- Order: Hymenoptera
- Family: Formicidae
- Subfamily: Myrmicinae
- Genus: Cephalotes
- Species: C. specularis

Binomial name
- Cephalotes specularis Brandão, Feitosa, Powell & Del-Claro, 2014

Species of ant

Mirror turtle ants (Cephalotes specularis) are a species of ant that mimic other, unrelated ants (Crematogaster ampla) in order to steal their food.

== Discovery ==
Assistant professor of biology Scott Powell at George Washington University discovered them while studying turtle ants in Brazil. Powell has said that the mirror turtle ant represents a glimpse of the early stages of social parasitism, before the parasite has "lost much of its free-living biology".
