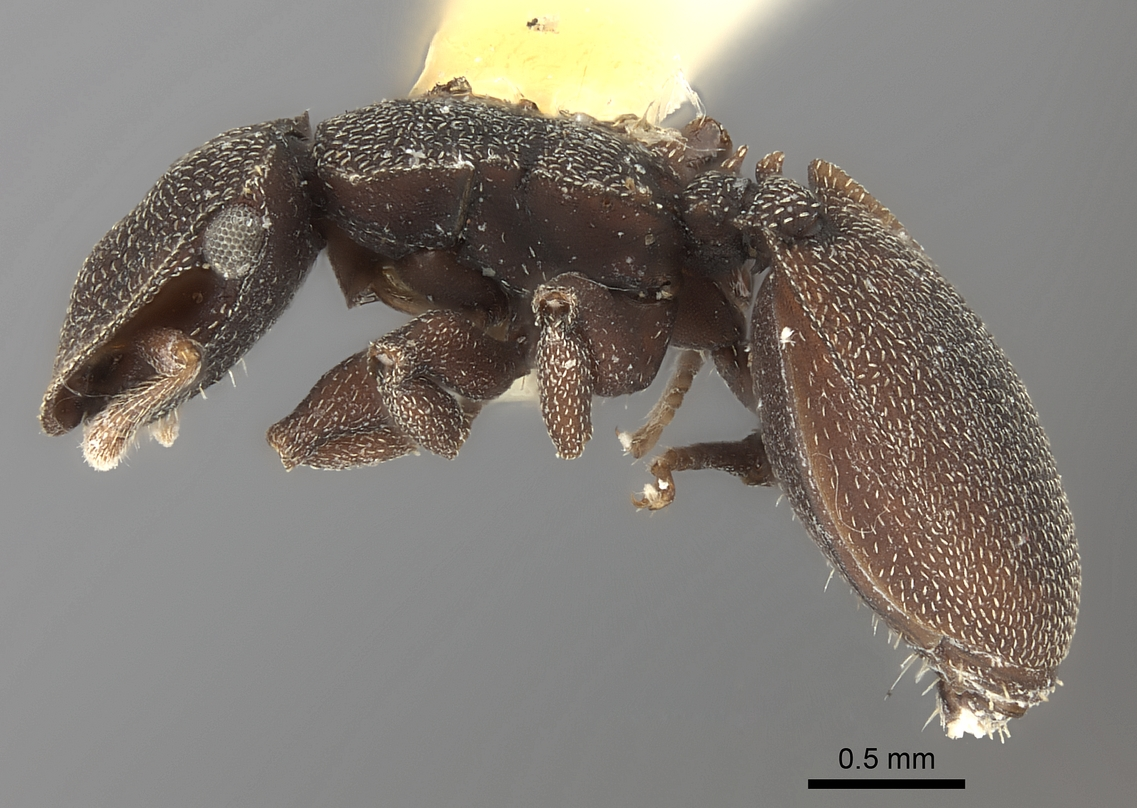
- Gliding ants

Scientific classification
- Domain: Eukaryota
- Kingdom: Animalia
- Phylum: Arthropoda
- Class: Insecta
- Order: Hymenoptera
- Family: Formicidae
- Subfamily: Myrmicinae
- Genus: Cephalotes
- Species: C. pallens

Binomial name
- Cephalotes pallens (Klug, 1824)

= Cephalotes pallens =

Species of ant

Cephalotes pallens is a species of arboreal ant of the genus Cephalotes, characterized by an odd shaped head and the ability to "parachute" by steering their fall if they drop off of the tree they are on. Giving their name also as gliding ants.
