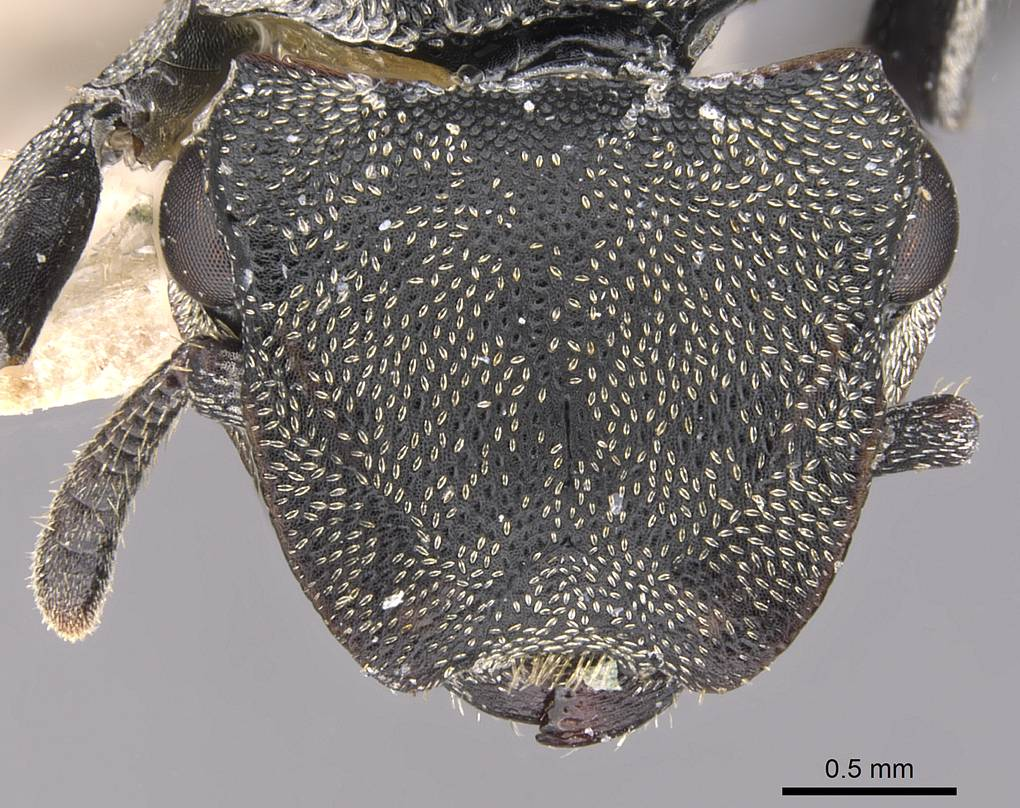

Scientific classification
- Domain: Eukaryota
- Kingdom: Animalia
- Phylum: Arthropoda
- Class: Insecta
- Order: Hymenoptera
- Family: Formicidae
- Subfamily: Myrmicinae
- Genus: Cephalotes
- Species: C. mompox

Binomial name
- Cephalotes mompox De Andrade, 1999

= Cephalotes mompox =

Species of ant

Cephalotes mompox is a species of arboreal ant of the genus Cephalotes, characterized by an odd shaped head, and the ability to "parachute" by steering their fall if they drop off from a tree. They are also known as gliding ants.
