= Cephalotes serraticeps =

Scientific classification
- Domain: Eukaryota
- Kingdom: Animalia
- Phylum: Arthropoda
- Class: Insecta
- Order: Hymenoptera
- Family: Formicidae
- Subfamily: Myrmicinae
- Genus: Cephalotes
- Species: C. serraticeps

Binomial name
- Cephalotes serraticeps (Smith, 1858)

Species of ant

Cephalotes serraticeps is a species of arboreal ant of the genus Cephalotes, characterized by an abnormally shaped head and the ability to "parachute" by steering their fall if they fall off the trees they live on. Giving their name also is gliding ants.
