= Cephalotes umbraculatus =

Scientific classification
- Domain: Eukaryota
- Kingdom: Animalia
- Phylum: Arthropoda
- Class: Insecta
- Order: Hymenoptera
- Family: Formicidae
- Subfamily: Myrmicinae
- Genus: Cephalotes
- Species: C. umbraculatus

Binomial name
- Cephalotes umbraculatus (Fabricius, 1804)

Species of ant

Cephalotes umbraculatus is a species of arboreal ant of the genus Cephalotes, characterized by an odd shaped head and the ability to "parachute" by steering their fall if they drop off of a tree. They are also known as gliding ants.
