= Cephalotes haemorrhoidalis =

Scientific classification
- Kingdom: Animalia
- Phylum: Arthropoda
- Clade: Pancrustacea
- Class: Insecta
- Order: Hymenoptera
- Family: Formicidae
- Subfamily: Myrmicinae
- Genus: Cephalotes
- Species: C. haemorrhoidalis

Binomial name
- Cephalotes haemorrhoidalis (Latreille, 1802)

Species of ant

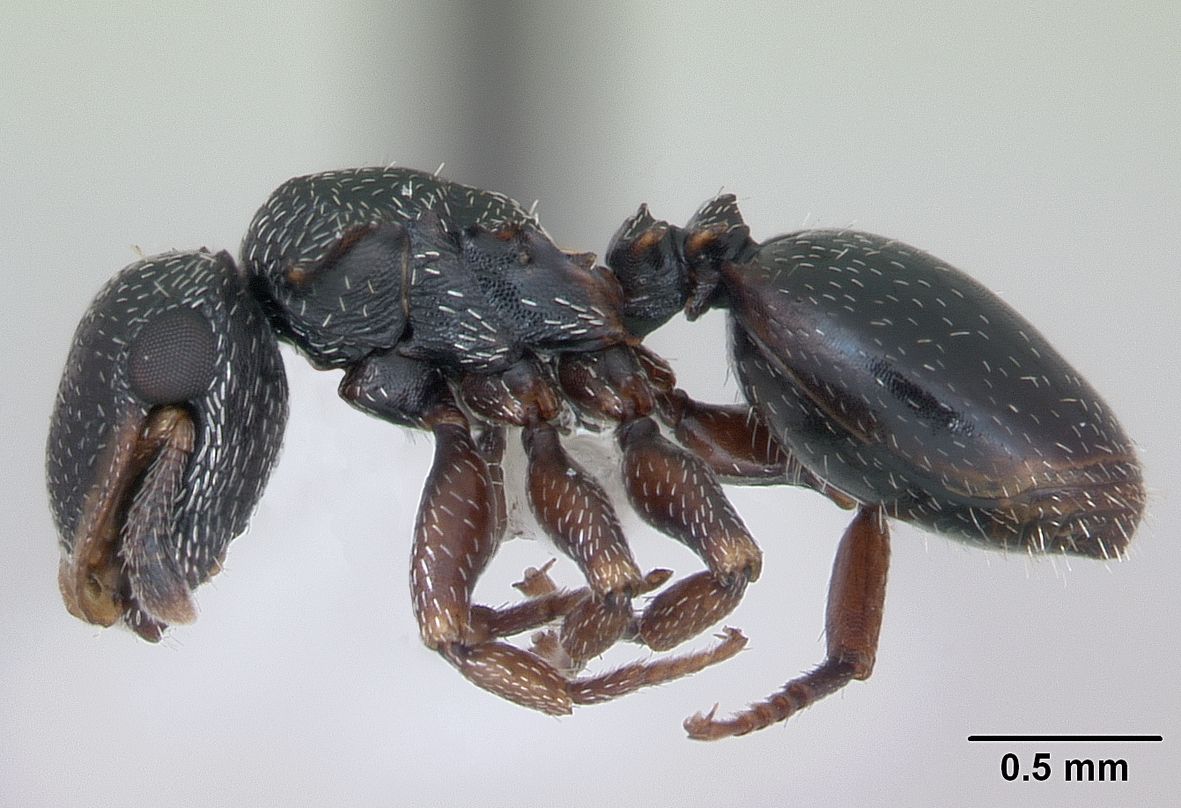
Ant Cephalotes guayaki

Cephalotes haemorrhoidalis is a species of arboreal ant of the genus Cephalotes, characterized by an odd shaped head and the ability to "parachute" by steering their fall while dropping from a tree. This species of ant is one of several gliding ants.
