= List of Copris species =

These species belong to Copris, a genus of dung beetles in the family Scarabaeidae.

== Copris species ==
- Copris acutidens Motschulsky, 1860
- Copris afgoi Cambefort, 1992
- Copris agnus Sharp, 1875
- Copris algol Nguyen-phung, 1989
- Copris amabilis Kolbe, 1914
- Copris amyntor Klug, 1855
- Copris anceus (Olivier, 1789)
- Copris andrewesi Waterhouse, 1891
- Copris angusticornis Arrow, 1933
- Copris angustus Nguyen-phung & Cambefort, 1986
- Copris anomiopseoides Boucomont, 1924
- Copris antares Ferreira, 1958
- Copris arcturus Gillet, 1907
- Copris ares Zelenka, 1993
- Copris arimotoi Ochi & Araya, 1992
- Copris arizonensis Schaeffer, 1906
- Copris armatus Harold, 1869
- Copris armeniacus Faldermann, 1835
- Copris armiger Gillet, 1910
- Copris arrowi Felsche, 1910
- Copris aspericollis Gillet, 1910
- Copris atropolitus Gillet, 1910
- Copris bacchus Thunberg, 1787
- Copris barclayi Ochi, Kon & Bai, 2009
- Copris basilewskyi Ferreira, 1962
- Copris basipunctatus Balthasar, 1942
- Copris bellator Chevrolat, 1844
- Copris bengalensis Gillet, 1911
- Copris bidens Kolbe, 1893
- Copris binodis
- Copris bootes Klug, 1855
- Copris boucardi Harold, 1869
- Copris bovinus Gillet, 1908
- Copris brachypterus Nomura, 1964
- Copris brittoni Ferreira, 1962
- Copris caelatus (Fabricius, 1794)
- Copris caliginosus Kohlmann, Cano & Delgado, 2003
- Copris cambeforti Nguyen-phung, 1988
- Copris cambodiensis Ochi, Kon & Kawahara, 2008
- Copris camerunus Felsche, 1904
- Copris caobangensis Bui, Dumack & Bonkowski, 2018
- Copris capensis Waterhouse, 1891
- Copris cariniceps Felsche, 1910
- Copris carinicus Gillet, 1910
- Copris carmelita Fabricius, 1801
- Copris cassius Péringuey, 1901
- Copris celebensis Lansberge, 1886
- Copris cheni Ochi, Kon & Bai, 2007
- Copris chimalapensis Mora-Aguilar & Delgado, 2015
- Copris ciliatus
- Copris colmanti Gillet, 1908
- Copris complexus Nguyen-phung, 1989
- Copris compressipennis Gillet, 1910
- Copris confucius Harold, 1877
- Copris coriarius Gillet, 1907
- Copris cornifrons Boheman, 1860
- Copris corniger Sahlberg, 1823
- Copris corpulentus Gillet, 1910
- Copris costaricensis Gahan, 1894
- Copris costariensis Matthews
- Copris crassus Deschodt & Davis, 2015
- Copris cribratus Gillet, 1927
- Copris cribricollis Gillet, 1910
- Copris curlettii Moretto, 2011
- Copris davidis (Deyrolle, 1878)
- Copris davisi Nguyen-phung & Cambefort, 1986
- Copris davisoni Waterhouse, 1891
- Copris decellei Cambefort, 1992
- Copris delicatus Arrow, 1931
- Copris denticulatus Nguyen-phung, 1988
- Copris diversus Waterhouse, 1891
- Copris draco Arrow, 1906
- Copris dracunculus Fereira, 1959
- Copris druidum Heer, 1862
- Copris dudleyi Cambefort, 1992
- Copris eburneus Cambefort, 1992
- Copris elpheneroides Felsche, 1910
- Copris elphenor Klug, 1855
- Copris erratus Lansberge, 1886
- Copris evanidus Klug, 1855
- Copris excisus Waterhouse, 1891
- Copris fallaciosus Gillet, 1907
- Copris fallax Felsche, 1910
- Copris felschei Reitter, 1892
- Copris fidius (Olivier, 1789)
- Copris frankenbergerianus Balthasar, 1958
- Copris freyi Ferreira, 1961
- Copris fricator (Fabricius, 1787)
- Copris fukiensis Balthasar, 1952
- Copris furciceps Felsche, 1910
- Copris garambae Cambefort, 1992
- Copris gazellarum Gillet, 1918
- Copris gibbulus Lansberge, 1886
- Copris gilleti Kolbe, 1907
- Copris gladiator Arrow, 1933
- Copris gopheri Hubbard, 1894
- Copris gracilis Waterhouse, 1891
- Copris graueri Kolbe, 1914
- Copris halffteri Matthews, 1959
- Copris harrisi Waterhouse, 1891
- Copris hartli Frey, 1975
- Copris hatayamai Ochi & Araya, 1992
- Copris hispanus (Linnaeus, 1764)
- Copris howdeni Matthews & Halffter, 1959
- Copris humilis Gillet, 1908
- Copris hybridus Gillet, 1910
- Copris igualensis Warner, 1990
- Copris illotus Balthasar, 1942
- Copris imitans Felsche, 1910
- Copris inaequabilis Zhang, 1997
- Copris incertus Say, 1835
- Copris inemarginatus Blatchley, 1918
- Copris inhalatus Quedenfeldt, 1884
- Copris insidiosus Péringuey, 1901
- Copris integer Reiche, 1847
- Copris interioris Kolbe, 1897
- Copris iris Sharp, 1875
- Copris jacchoides Nguyen-phung & Cambefort, 1987
- Copris jacchus (Fabricius, 1775)
- Copris jahi Nguyen-phung & Cambefort, 1986
- Copris johkii Ochi & Kon, 2014
- Copris juanmorai Mora-Aguilar & Delgado, 2015
- Copris jucundus Gillet, 1932
- Copris kachinensis Ochi, Kon & Kawahara, 2008
- Copris kartlinus Kabakov, 1988
- Copris kasagii Ochi & Kon, 1996
- Copris kasanka Josso & Prévost, 2016
- Copris katangae Cambefort & Nguyen-phung, 1996
- Copris keralensis Gill, 1986
- Copris kiuchii Masumoto, 1989
- Copris klapperichi Balthasar, 1942
- Copris klugi Harold, 1869
- Copris kusakabei Ochi, Kon & Kawahara, 2005
- Copris laeviceps Harold, 1862
- Copris laevigatus Gillet, 1927
- Copris laiiformis Nguyen-phung & Cambefort, 1987
- Copris laioides Boucomont, 1932
- Copris laius Harold, 1868
- Copris lannathai Hanboonsong & Masumoto & Ochi, 2003
- Copris leakeyorum Paulian, 1976
- Copris lecontei Matthews, 1962
- Copris leruei Josso & Prévost, 2017
- Copris lugubris Boheman, 1858
- Copris lunaris (Linnaeus, 1758)
- Copris macacus Lansberge, 1886
- Copris macclevei Warner, 1990
- Copris macer Péringuey, 1901
- Copris maesi Ratcliffe, 1998
- Copris magicus Harold, 1881
- Copris manni Ochi, Kon & Bai, 2009
- Copris marcus Gillet, 1921
- Copris martinae Nguyen-phung, 1988
- Copris martinezi Matthews and Halffter, 1968
- Copris matthewsi Delgado & Kohlmann, 2001
- Copris medogensis Zhang, 1988
- Copris megaceratoides Waterhouse, 1891
- Copris megasoma Matthews & Halffter, 1959
- Copris mesacanthus Harold, 1878
- Copris mexicanus Matthews & Halffter, 1959
- Copris minutus (Drury, 1773)
- Copris misellus Péringuey, 1901
- Copris moechus LeConte, 1854
- Copris moffartsi Gillet, 1907
- Copris mongkhoni Hanboonsong & Masumoto & Ochi, 2003
- Copris montivagus Gillet, 1908
- Copris morphaeus Gillet, 1932
- Copris mourgliai Zelenka, 1993
- Copris neglectus Moxey, 1963
- Copris neotridens Génier & Prévost, 2017
- Copris nepos Gillet, 1908
- Copris nevinsoni Waterhouse, 1891
- Copris novaki Zelenka, 1992
- Copris nubilosus Kohlmann & Cano & Delgado, 2003
- Copris numa Lansberge, 1886
- Copris obenbergeri Balthasar, 1933
- Copris obesus Boheman, 1857
- Copris ochus (Motschulsky, 1860)
- Copris orion Klug, 1835
- Copris orphanus Guérin-Méneville, 1847
- Copris parapecuarius Ochi, Kon & Kawahara, 2008
- Copris pauliani Nguyen-phung & Cambefort, 1986
- Copris pecuarius Lewis, 1884
- Copris pedarioides Lansberge, 1886
- Copris phungae Cambefort, 1992
- Copris phylax Gillet, 1908
- Copris poggii Ochi & Kon, 2005
- Copris potanini Semenov, 1891
- Copris prevosti Josso, 2011
- Copris pristinus Pierce, 1946
- Copris pseudobootes Ferreira, 1962
- Copris pseudochus Ochi & Kon, 2004
- Copris pseudomoffartsi Moretto, 2011
- Copris pseudosinicus Balthasar, 1958
- Copris pueli Mollandin De Boissy, 1905
- Copris punctatus Gillet, 1910
- Copris puncticollis Boheman, 1857
- Copris punctipennis Boucomont, 1914
- Copris punctulatus Wiedemann, 1823
- Copris punjabensis Gillet, 1921
- Copris quasilaevigatus Ochi, Kon & Bai, 2007
- Copris ramosiceps Gillet, 1921
- Copris rebouchei Harold, 1869
- Copris remotus Leconte, 1866
- Copris renwarti Nguyen-phung & Cambefort, 1986
- Copris repertus Walker, 1858
- Copris ribbei Lansberge, 1886
- Copris riekoae Ochi & Kon, 2003
- Copris ritsemae Harold, 1875
- Copris rugosus Gillet, 1908
- Copris ruricola Balthasar, 1933
- Copris sabinus Gillet, 1910
- Copris sacontala Redtenbacher, 1848
- Copris sallei Harold, 1869
- Copris sarpedon Harold, 1868
- Copris saundersi Harold, 1869
- Copris schoolmeestersi Ochi & Kon, 2010
- Copris scorpio Zelenka, 1993
- Copris serius Nguyen-phung, 1987
- Copris sexdentatus Thunberg, 1818
- Copris siamensis Gillet, 1910
- Copris siangensis Biswas, 1980
- Copris sierrensis Matthews, 1961
- Copris signatus Walker, 1858
- Copris simonettai Cambefort, 1992
- Copris simulator Nguyen-phung & Cambefort, 1986
- Copris singularis Nguyen-phung & Cambefort, 1986
- Copris sinicus Hope, 1842
- Copris sinon (Olivier, 1789)
- Copris sodalis Walker, 1858
- Copris sonensis Bui, Dumack & Bonkowski, 2018
- Copris sorex Balthasar, 1942
- Copris sphaeropterus Harold, 1877
- Copris spinator Harold, 1881
- Copris subdolus Balthasar, 1958
- Copris subpunctatus Gillet, 1910
- Copris subsidens Péringuey, 1901
- Copris subterraneus Heer, 1862
- Copris sumatrensis Gillet, 1921
- Copris surdus Arrow, 1931
- Copris szechouanicus Balthasar, 1958
- Copris tetraodon Gillet, 1910
- Copris tridentatus Solis & Kohlmann, 2003
- Copris tripartitus Waterhouse, 1875
- Copris truncatus Felsche, 1901
- Copris tsukamotoi Ochi, Kon & Kawahara, 2008
- Copris typhoeus Gerstaecker, 1884
- Copris uenoi Hanboonsong & Masumoto & Ochi, 2003
- Copris umbilicatus Abeille De Perrin, 1901
- Copris urus Boheman, 1857
- Copris usambaricus Gillet, 1908
- Copris vankhaii Nguyen-phung, 1988
- Copris victorini Boheman, 1857
- Copris vietnamicus Kabakov, 1994
- Copris vilhenai Ferreira, 1962
- Copris vrydaghi Ferreira, 1962
- Copris warneri Mccleve & Kohlmann, 2005
- Copris wiesei Kolbe, 1914
- Copris yangi Ochi, Kon & Bai, 2007
- Copris youngai Balthasar, 1967
- Copris zhangi Ochi, Kon & Bai, 2009
