= List of Canthidium species =

This is a list of 172 species in Canthidium, a genus of dung beetles in the family Scarabaeidae.

== Canthidium species ==
- Canthidium abbreviatum Harold, 1867^{c g}
- Canthidium aeneolum Harold, 1867^{c g}
- Canthidium alvarezi Martinez & Halffter, 1986^{c g}
- Canthidium andersoni Kohlmann & Solis, 2006^{c g}
- Canthidium angulicolle Balthasar, 1939^{c g}
- Canthidium angusticeps Bates, 1887^{c g}
- Canthidium annagabrielae Solis & Kohlmann, 2004^{c g}
- Canthidium ardens Bates, 1887^{c g}
- Canthidium aterrimum Harold, 1867^{c g}
- Canthidium atomarium Balthasar, 1939^{c g}
- Canthidium atramentarium Balthasar, 1939^{c g}
- Canthidium atricolle Preudhomme de Borre, 1886^{c g}
- Canthidium aurichalceum Preudhomme de Borre, 1886^{c g}
- Canthidium auricolle Harold, 1867^{c g}
- Canthidium aurifex Bates, 1887^{c g}
- Canthidium barbacenicum Preudhomme de Borre, 1886^{c g}
- Canthidium basale Harold, 1867^{c g}
- Canthidium basipunctatum Balthasar, 1939^{c g}
- Canthidium batesi Harold, 1867^{c g}
- Canthidium bicolor Boucomont, 1928^{c g}
- Canthidium bituberifrons Howden & Young, 1981^{c g}
- Canthidium bokermanni (Martinez, Halffter & Pereira, 1964)^{c g}
- Canthidium bovinum Harold, 1867^{c g}
- Canthidium breve (Germar, 1824)^{c g}
- Canthidium caesareum Balthasar, 1939^{c g}
- Canthidium calidum Harold, 1880^{c g}
- Canthidium cavifrons Balthasar, 1939^{c g}
- Canthidium centrale (Boucomont, 1928)^{c g}
- Canthidium chabanaudi Boucomont, 1928^{c g}
- Canthidium chrysis (Fabricius, 1801)^{c g}
- Canthidium clypeale Harold, 1867^{c g}
- Canthidium coerulescens Balthasar, 1939^{c g}
- Canthidium cognatum Preudhomme de Borre, 1886^{c g}
- Canthidium collare (Castelnau, 1840)^{c g}
- Canthidium convexifrons Balthasar, 1939^{c g}
- Canthidium cupreum (Blanchard, 1846)^{c g}
- Canthidium cuprinum Harold, 1867^{c g}
- Canthidium darwini Kohlmann & Solis, 2009^{c g}
- Canthidium decoratum (Perty, 1830)^{c g}
- Canthidium delgadoi Kohlmann & Solis, 2006^{c g}
- Canthidium deplanatum Balthasar, 1939^{c g}
- Canthidium depressum Boucomont, 1928^{c g}
- Canthidium deyrollei Harold, 1867^{c g}
- Canthidium discolor Harold, 1867^{c g}
- Canthidium discopygidiale Howden & Young, 1981^{c g}
- Canthidium dispar Harold, 1867^{c g}
- Canthidium dohrni Harold, 1867^{c g}
- Canthidium elegantulum Balthasar, 1939^{c g}
- Canthidium emoryi Solis & Kohlmann, 2004^{c g}
- Canthidium epistomale Boucomont, 1928^{c g}
- Canthidium erythropterum (Lucas, 1857)^{c g}
- Canthidium escalerai Balthasar, 1939^{c g}
- Canthidium euchalceum Balthasar, 1939^{c g}
- Canthidium excisipes Balthasar, 1939^{c g}
- Canthidium femoratum Boucomont, 1935^{c g}
- Canthidium flabellatum Harold, 1883^{c g}
- Canthidium flavicorne (Blanchard, 1846)^{c g}
- Canthidium flavipes Harold, 1867^{c g}
- Canthidium flavum Balthasar, 1939^{c g}
- Canthidium foveolatum Harold, 1867^{c g}
- Canthidium funebre Balthasar, 1939^{c g}
- Canthidium gemmingeri Harold, 1867^{c g}
- Canthidium gerstaeckeri Harold, 1867^{c g}
- Canthidium gigas Balthasar, 1939^{c g}
- Canthidium glabricolle Harold, 1867^{c g}
- Canthidium globulum Harold, 1867^{c g}
- Canthidium gracilipes Harold, 1867^{c g}
- Canthidium granuliferum (Pereira, 1949)^{c}
- Canthidium guanacaste Howden & Gill, 1987^{c g}
- Canthidium guyanense Boucomont, 1928^{c g}
- Canthidium haagi Harold, 1867^{c g}
- Canthidium haroldi Preudhomme de Borre, 1886^{c g}
- Canthidium hespenheidei Howden & Young, 1981^{c g}
- Canthidium histrio Balthasar, 1939^{c g}
- Canthidium howdeni Kohlmann & Solis, 2006^{c g}
- Canthidium humerale (Germar, 1813)^{c g}
- Canthidium hyla Balthasar, 1939^{c g}
- Canthidium hypocrita Balthasar, 1939^{c g}
- Canthidium imperiale Harold, 1876^{c g}
- Canthidium impressum Boucomont, 1928^{c g}
- Canthidium inerme Harold, 1867^{c g}
- Canthidium inoptatum Balthasar, 1939^{c g}
- Canthidium kelleri (Martinez, Halffter & Pereira, 1964)^{c g}
- Canthidium kiesenwetteri Harold, 1867^{c g}
- Canthidium kirschi Harold, 1875^{c g}
- Canthidium korschefskyi Balthasar, 1939^{c g}
- Canthidium kraatzi Harold, 1867^{c g}
- Canthidium laetum Harold, 1867^{i c g}
- Canthidium laevigatum Harold, 1867^{c g}
- Canthidium latipleurum Preudhomme de Borre, 1886^{c g}
- Canthidium latum (Blanchard, 1846)^{c g}
- Canthidium lebasi Harold, 1867^{c g}
- Canthidium lentum Erichson, 1847^{c g}
- Canthidium leucopterum Howden & Young, 1981^{c g}
- Canthidium lucidum Harold, 1867^{c g}
- Canthidium luteum Balthasar, 1939^{c g}
- Canthidium macclevei Kohlmann & Solis, 2006^{i c g b}
- Canthidium macroculare Howden & Gill, 1987^{c g}
- Canthidium magnum Harold, 1871^{c g}
- Canthidium manni Arrow, 1913^{c g}
- Canthidium margaritae Kohlmann & Solis, 2006^{c g}
- Canthidium marianelae Solis & Kohlmann, 2004^{c g}
- Canthidium marielae Solis & Kohlmann, 2004^{c g}
- Canthidium marseuli Harold, 1867^{c g}
- Canthidium melanocephalum (Olivier, 1789)^{c g}
- Canthidium metallicum Harold, 1867^{c g}
- Canthidium minimum Harold, 1883^{c g}
- Canthidium miscellum Harold, 1883^{c g}
- Canthidium moestum Harold, 1867^{c g}
- Canthidium monoceros Harold, 1869^{c g}
- Canthidium moroni Kohlmann & Solis, 2006^{c g}
- Canthidium multipunctatum Balthasar, 1939^{c g}
- Canthidium muticum (Boheman, 1858)^{c g}
- Canthidium nanum Harold, 1867^{c g}
- Canthidium nigritum Preudhomme de Borre, 1886^{c g}
- Canthidium nitidum (Blanchard, 1846)^{c g}
- Canthidium nobile Harold, 1867^{c g}
- Canthidium obscurum Harold, 1867^{c g}
- Canthidium onitoides (Perty, 1830)^{c g}
- Canthidium onthophagoides Martinez & Halffter, 1986^{c g}
- Canthidium opacum Balthasar, 1939^{c g}
- Canthidium pallidoalatum Howden & Young, 1981^{c g}
- Canthidium paranum Harold, 1867^{c g}
- Canthidium parvulum Harold, 1883^{c g}
- Canthidium perceptibile Howden & Young, 1981^{c g}
- Canthidium persplendens Balthasar, 1939^{c g}
- Canthidium picipes Harold, 1867^{c g}
- Canthidium pinotoides Balthasar, 1939^{c g}
- Canthidium planovultum Howden & Young, 1981^{c g}
- Canthidium politum Harold, 1867^{c g}
- Canthidium prasinum (Blanchard, 1846)^{c g}
- Canthidium priscillae Solis & Kohlmann, 2004^{c g}
- Canthidium pseudaurifex Balthasar, 1939^{c g}
- Canthidium pseudoperceptibile Kohlmann & Solis, 2006^{c g}
- Canthidium pseudopuncticolle Solís and Kohlmann, 2004^{i c g}
- Canthidium pullus (Felsche, 1910)^{c g}
- Canthidium punctatostriatum (Mannerheim, 1829)^{c g}
- Canthidium puncticeps Harold, 1867^{c g}
- Canthidium puncticolle Harold, 1867^{c g}
- Canthidium quadridens Harold, 1867^{c g}
- Canthidium refulgens Boucomont, 1928^{c g}
- Canthidium riverai Kohlmann & Solis, 2006^{c g}
- Canthidium ruficolle (Germar, 1824)^{c g}
- Canthidium rufinum Harold, 1867^{c g}
- Canthidium rufipes Harold, 1867^{c g}
- Canthidium rutilum Harold, 1867^{c g}
- Canthidium seladon Balthasar, 1939^{c g}
- Canthidium semicupreum Harold, 1868^{c g}
- Canthidium sladeni Arrow, 1903^{c g}
- Canthidium smaragdinum Harold, 1867^{c g}
- Canthidium smithi Bates, 1889^{c g}
- Canthidium splendidum Preudhomme de Borre, 1886^{c g}
- Canthidium stali Harold, 1867^{c g}
- Canthidium steinheili Harold, 1880^{c g}
- Canthidium subdopuncticolle Howden & Young, 1981^{c g}
- Canthidium sulcatum (Perty, 1830)^{c g}
- Canthidium sulcicolle Harold, 1868^{c g}
- Canthidium taurinum Harold, 1867^{c g}
- Canthidium tenebrosum Howden & Young, 1981^{c g}
- Canthidium thalassinum Erichson, 1847^{c g}
- Canthidium titschacki Balthasar, 1939^{c g}
- Canthidium tricolor Balthasar, 1939^{c g}
- Canthidium tridenticeps (Arrow, 1913)
- Canthidium trinodosum (Boheman, 1858)^{c g}
- Canthidium tuberifrons Howden & Young, 1981^{c g}
- Canthidium variolosum Howden & Young, 1981^{c g}
- Canthidium versicolor Harold, 1867^{c g}
- Canthidium vespertinum Howden & Young, 1981^{c g}
- Canthidium violaceipenne (Blanchard, 1846)^{c g}
- Canthidium viride (Lucas, 1857)^{c g}
- Canthidium viridicolle (Blanchard, 1846)^{c g}
- Canthidium viridiobscurum Boucomont, 1928^{c g}
- Canthidium volxemi Preudhomme de Borre, 1886^{c g}

Data sources: i = ITIS, c = Catalogue of Life, g = GBIF, b = Bugguide.net
