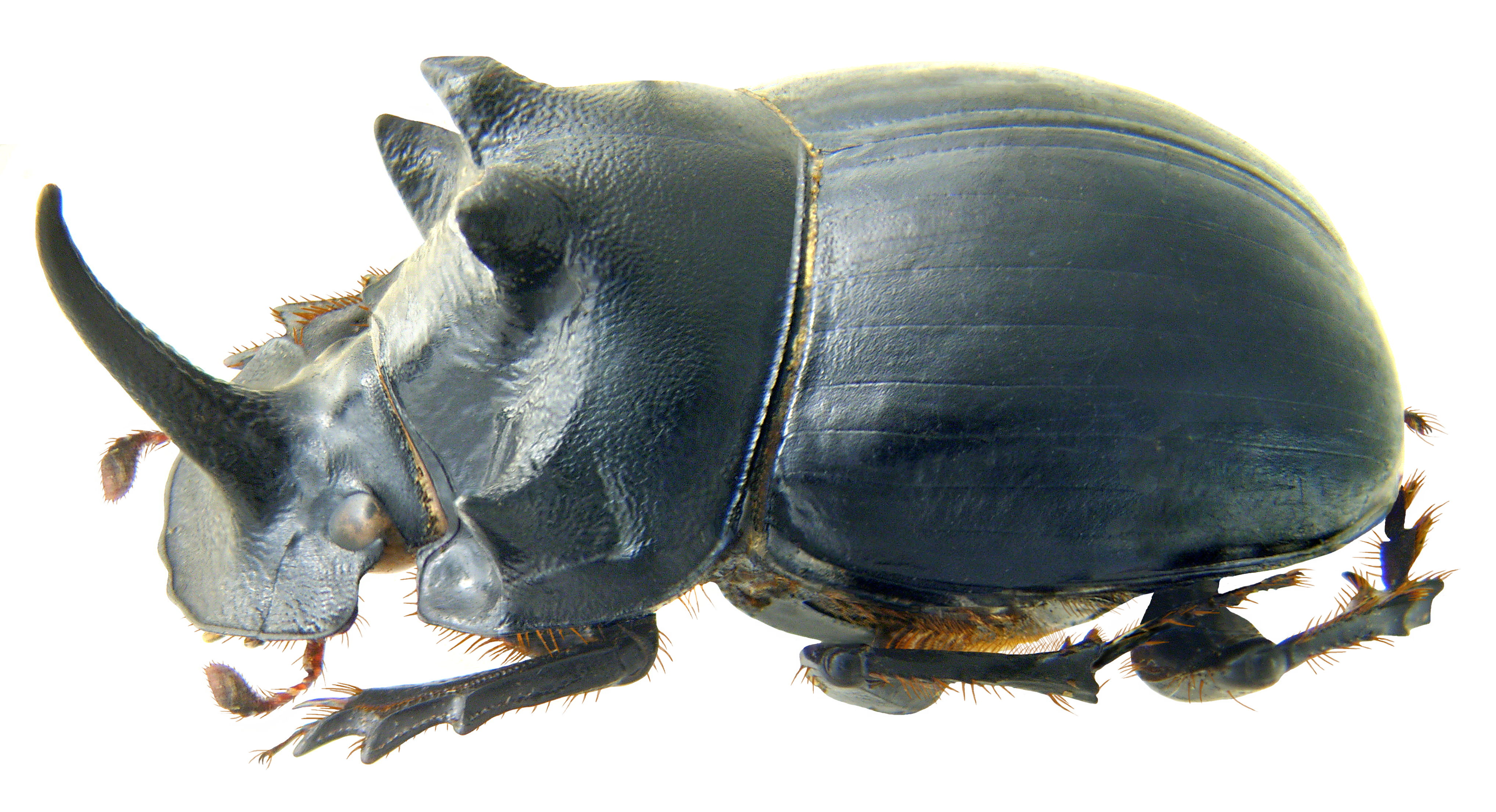
- Male Copris sacontala

Scientific classification
- Kingdom: Animalia
- Phylum: Arthropoda
- Clade: Pancrustacea
- Class: Insecta
- Order: Coleoptera
- Suborder: Polyphaga
- Infraorder: Scarabaeiformia
- Family: Scarabaeidae
- Subfamily: Scarabaeinae
- Tribe: Coprini; Kolbe, 1805

= Coprini =

Tribe of beetles

Coprini is a tribe of scarab beetles, in the dung beetle subfamily (Scarabaeinae). Scholtz et al. describe them as tunnellers that are shiny black, of moderate to large size (9–30 mm long) and with a strongly convex shape. They also, however state that the grouping based on these characteristics has little phylogenetic validity, and the placement of several genera in this and related tribes is likely to change.

== Taxonomy ==
This tribe comprises more than 900 species in 21 genera:

== Genera ==
These genera belong to the tribe Coprini:

- Canthidium Erichson, 1847
- Catharsius Hope, 1837 (Africa and Asia)
- Chalcocopris Burmeister, 1846 (Brazil)
- Copridaspidus Boucomont, 1920 (Africa)
- Copris Geoffroy, 1762 (cosmopolitan, introduced into Australia and Hawaii)
- Coptodactyla Burmeister, 1846 (Australia, Melanesia)
- Dichotomius Hope, 1838 (southern USA to South America)
- Heliocopris Hope, 1837 (tropical Africa, southeast Asia)
- Holocanthon Martínez & Pereira, 1956
- Holocephalus Hope, 1838 (southern Brazil, Paraguay)
- Isocopris Pereira et Martínez (Brazil)
- Litocopris Waterhouse, 1891 (Africa)
- Macroderes Westwood, 1876 (South Africa)
- Metacatharsius Paulian, 1939 (Africa)
- Ontherus Erichson, 1847 (Central and South America)
- Parachorius Harold, 1873
- Pseudocopris Ferreira, 1960 (Angola, Congo, Mozambique, Tanzania, Zambia, Zimbabwe)
- Pseudopedaria Felsche, 1904 (tropical Africa)
- Synapsis Bates, 1868
- Thyregis Blackburn, 1904 (Middle and southeast Asia)
- Xinidium Harold, 1869 (South Africa)

== Ecology ==
Most species are nocturnal. They are predominantly coprophagous, but some are necrophagous. Dung is rapidly buried in shallow tunnels and then used for nest construction in deeper tunnels.
