= C. minutus =

C. minutus may refer to:

- Calcinus minutus, a hermit crab species
- Chalcides minutus, the small three-toed skink, a lizard species found in Morocco and western Algeria
- Copris minutus, the small black dung beetle, a species of dung beetle common in North America
- Ctenomys minutus, the tiny tuco-tuco, a rodent species found in Brazil
- Cephalotes minutus, a species of ant

== See also ==
- List of Latin and Greek words commonly used in systematic names § M
