= Ontherus aphodioides =

Scientific classification
- Kingdom: Animalia
- Phylum: Arthropoda
- Clade: Pancrustacea
- Class: Insecta
- Order: Coleoptera
- Suborder: Polyphaga
- Infraorder: Scarabaeiformia
- Family: Scarabaeidae
- Genus: Ontherus
- Species: O. aphodioides

Binomial name
- Ontherus aphodioides Burmeister, 1874

Synonyms
- Ontherus convexus Luederwaldt, 1930

Species of beetle

Ontherus aphodioides is a species of beetle of the family Scarabaeidae. It is found in Argentina, Bolivia, Brazil (Pernambuco, Rio de Janeiro, Rio Grande do Sul, São Paulo), Colombia, Paraguay, Peru and Venezuela.
