= Copris megaceratoides =

Scientific classification
- Kingdom: Animalia
- Phylum: Arthropoda
- Class: Insecta
- Order: Coleoptera
- Suborder: Polyphaga
- Infraorder: Scarabaeiformia
- Family: Scarabaeidae
- Genus: Copris
- Species: C. megaceratoides

Binomial name
- Copris megaceratoides Waterhouse, 1891

Synonyms
- Copris dracoides Frey; Copris ferreirae Frey, 1974

Species of beetle

Copris megaceratoides is a species of beetle of the family Scarabaeidae. It is found in Benin, Gambia, Ghana, Nigeria, the Democratic Republic of the Congo, Guinea and Senegal.

== Description ==
Adults reach a length of about 20–23 mm. They are black, slightly glossy and partly dull. There is a backward-curving conical horn on the frons. The entire head, including the horn, is densely and very shallowly punctate. The pronotum bears a broad projection. Next to this, is a very deep, round pit, which is flanked outwards by a large, triangular, and pointed tooth. This tooth is inclined forwards and slightly outwards and has an accessory tooth at its base. The pronotum is densely and shallowly punctate. The elytra are distinctly striate.
