= Copris inemarginatus =

Scientific classification
- Domain: Eukaryota
- Kingdom: Animalia
- Phylum: Arthropoda
- Class: Insecta
- Order: Coleoptera
- Suborder: Polyphaga
- Infraorder: Scarabaeiformia
- Family: Scarabaeidae
- Genus: Copris
- Species: C. inemarginatus

Binomial name
- Copris inemarginatus Blatchley, 1918

Species of beetle

Copris inemarginatus is a species of dung beetle in the family Scarabaeidae.
