= Dichotomius worontzowi =

Scientific classification
- Kingdom: Animalia
- Phylum: Arthropoda
- Clade: Pancrustacea
- Class: Insecta
- Order: Coleoptera
- Suborder: Polyphaga
- Infraorder: Scarabaeiformia
- Family: Scarabaeidae
- Genus: Dichotomius
- Species: D. worontzowi

Binomial name
- Dichotomius worontzowi (Pereira, 1942)

Synonyms
- Pinotus worontzowi Pereira, 1942

Species of beetle

Dichotomius worontzowi is a species of beetle of the family Scarabaeidae. It is found in Bolivia, Brazil (Acre, Amapá, Amazonas, Mato Grosso, Pará, Rondônia, Roraima, Tocantins), Colombia, French Guiana, Guyana, Peru, Suriname and Venezuela.
