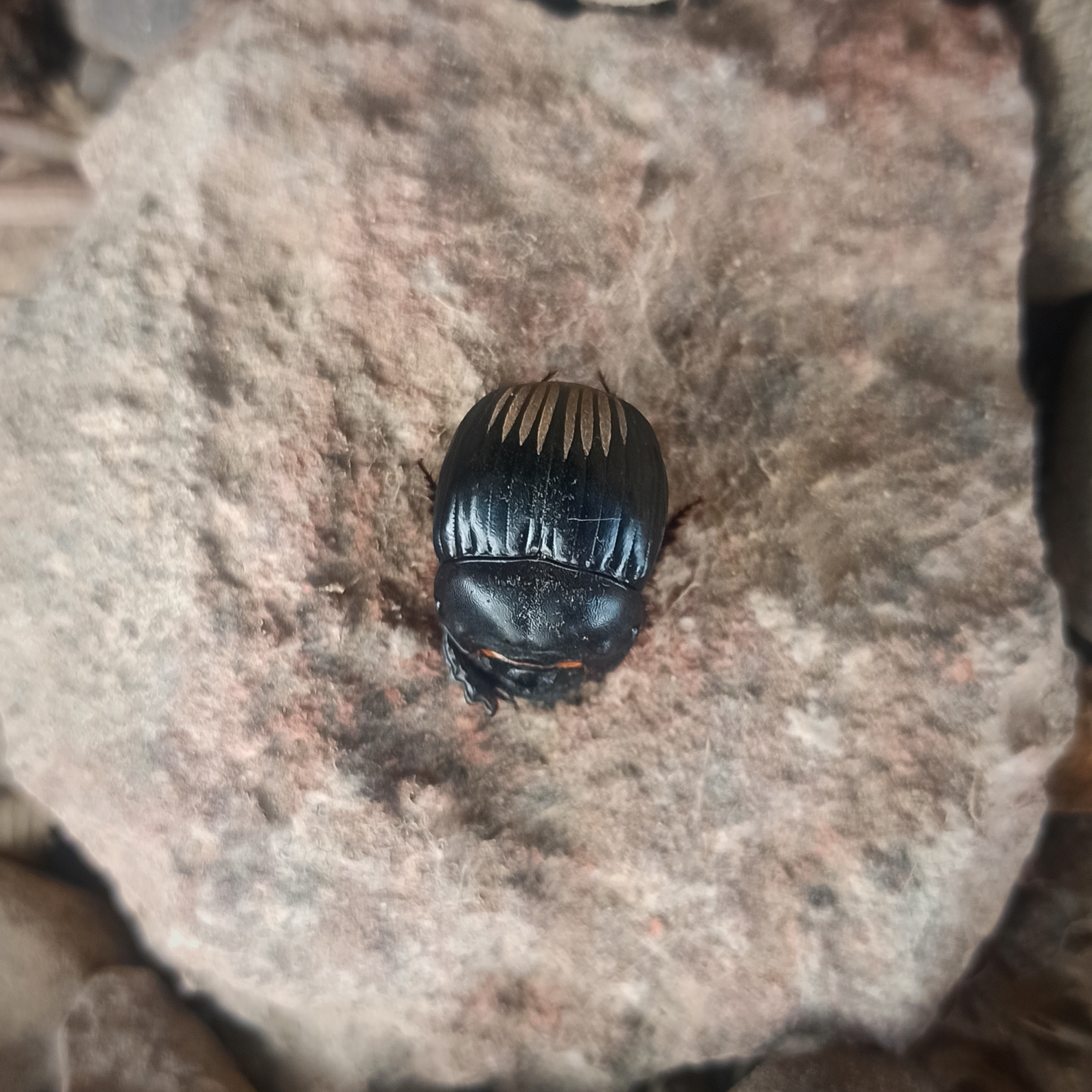

Scientific classification
- Domain: Eukaryota
- Kingdom: Animalia
- Phylum: Arthropoda
- Class: Insecta
- Order: Coleoptera
- Suborder: Polyphaga
- Infraorder: Scarabaeiformia
- Family: Scarabaeidae
- Genus: Dichotomius
- Species: D. colonicus

Binomial name
- Dichotomius colonicus (Say, 1835)

= Dichotomius colonicus =

Species of beetle

Dichotomius colonicus is a species of dung beetle in the family Scarabaeidae.
