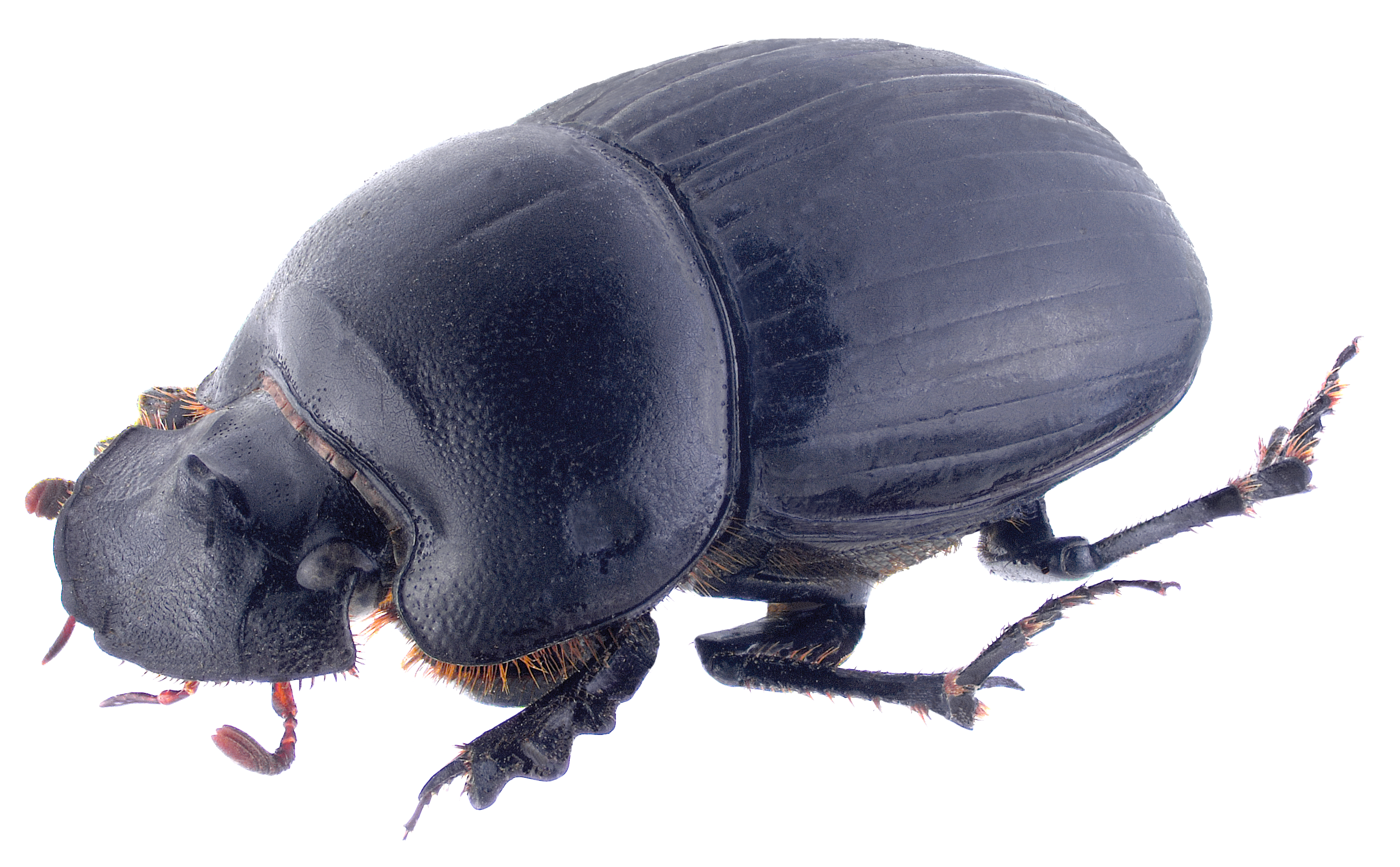
- Dung beetle

Scientific classification
- Kingdom: Animalia
- Phylum: Arthropoda
- Class: Insecta
- Order: Coleoptera
- Suborder: Polyphaga
- Infraorder: Scarabaeiformia
- Family: Scarabaeidae
- Genus: Copris
- Species: C. repertus

Binomial name
- Copris repertus Walker, 1858

Synonyms
- Copris claudius Harold, 1877; Copris repertus Arrow, 1931; Copris (Copris) repertus Balthasar, 1963

= Copris repertus =

Species of beetle

Copris repertus, is a species of dung beetle found in India, Sri Lanka and Myanmar.

== Description ==
The species has an average length of about 16 to 22 mm.

Adults are observed from both old and fresh elephant dungs. Habitat is montane tropical forest, secondary tropical forest and secondary savannah.
