= Copris howdeni =

Scientific classification
- Domain: Eukaryota
- Kingdom: Animalia
- Phylum: Arthropoda
- Class: Insecta
- Order: Coleoptera
- Suborder: Polyphaga
- Infraorder: Scarabaeiformia
- Family: Scarabaeidae
- Genus: Copris
- Species: C. howdeni

Binomial name
- Copris howdeni Matthews & Halffter, 1959

Species of beetle

Copris howdeni, or Howden's copri, is a species of dung beetle in the family Scarabaeidae.
