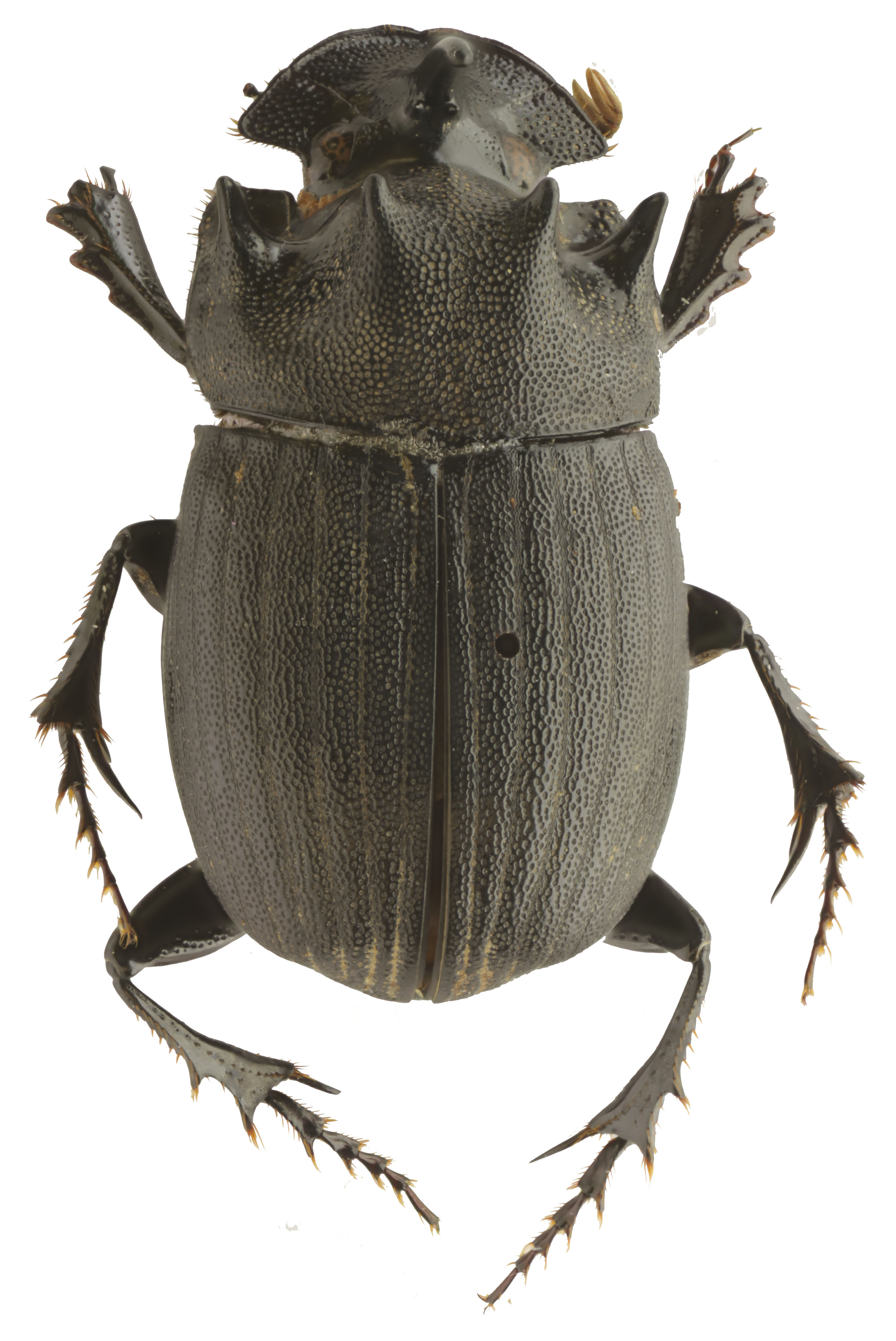

Scientific classification
- Domain: Eukaryota
- Kingdom: Animalia
- Phylum: Arthropoda
- Class: Insecta
- Order: Coleoptera
- Suborder: Polyphaga
- Infraorder: Scarabaeiformia
- Family: Scarabaeidae
- Genus: Copris
- Species: C. caobangensis

Binomial name
- Copris caobangensis (Bui, Dumack & Bonkowski, 2018)

= Copris caobangensis =

Species of beetle

Copris caobangensis is a species of dung beetles described in 2018. The holotype was collected in Pia Oac Nature Reserve, Caobang Province, Vietnam at an altitude of 1210–1230 m in 2017.
