= Dichotomius prietoi =

Scientific classification
- Kingdom: Animalia
- Phylum: Arthropoda
- Clade: Pancrustacea
- Class: Insecta
- Order: Coleoptera
- Suborder: Polyphaga
- Infraorder: Scarabaeiformia
- Family: Scarabaeidae
- Genus: Dichotomius
- Species: D. prietoi

Binomial name
- Dichotomius prietoi Martinez & Martinez, 1982

Species of beetle

Dichotomius prietoi is a species of beetle of the family Scarabaeidae. It is found in Bolivia, Brazil (Acre, Amazonas), Ecuador and Peru.
