= Canthidium macclevei =

Scientific classification
- Kingdom: Animalia
- Phylum: Arthropoda
- Clade: Pancrustacea
- Class: Insecta
- Order: Coleoptera
- Suborder: Polyphaga
- Infraorder: Scarabaeiformia
- Family: Scarabaeidae
- Genus: Canthidium
- Species: C. macclevei

Binomial name
- Canthidium macclevei Kohlmann & Solis, 2006

Species of beetle

Canthidium macclevei is a species of dung beetle in the family Scarabaeidae. It is known from Mexico across multiple states (Chihuahua, Guerrero, Jalisco, México, Michoacán, Nayarit, Oaxaca, Sinaloa, and Sonora) at elevations of 80–1,980 m (260–6,500 ft) above sea level. It is named for Scott McCleve who collected the type series.

Canthidium macclevei measure 3.5–5 mm (0.14–0.20 in) in length.
