= Canthidium tridenticeps =

Scientific classification
- Kingdom: Animalia
- Phylum: Arthropoda
- Clade: Pancrustacea
- Class: Insecta
- Order: Coleoptera
- Suborder: Polyphaga
- Infraorder: Scarabaeiformia
- Family: Scarabaeidae
- Genus: Canthidium
- Species: C. tridenticeps

Binomial name
- Canthidium tridenticeps (Arrow, 1913)

Synonyms
- Choeridium tridenticeps Arrow, 1913; Ateuchus tridenticeps

Species of beetle

Canthidium tridenticeps is a species of beetle of the family Scarabaeidae. It is found in Brazil (Rondônia).
