= Canthidium multipunctatum =

Scientific classification
- Kingdom: Animalia
- Phylum: Arthropoda
- Clade: Pancrustacea
- Class: Insecta
- Order: Coleoptera
- Suborder: Polyphaga
- Infraorder: Scarabaeiformia
- Family: Scarabaeidae
- Genus: Canthidium
- Species: C. multipunctatum

Binomial name
- Canthidium multipunctatum Balthasar, 1939

Species of beetle

Canthidium multipunctatum is a species of beetle of the family Scarabaeidae. It is found in Bolivia, Paraguay and Peru.
