= Canthidium viridiobscurum =

Scientific classification
- Kingdom: Animalia
- Phylum: Arthropoda
- Clade: Pancrustacea
- Class: Insecta
- Order: Coleoptera
- Suborder: Polyphaga
- Infraorder: Scarabaeiformia
- Family: Scarabaeidae
- Genus: Canthidium
- Species: C. viridiobscurum

Binomial name
- Canthidium viridiobscurum Boucomont, 1928

Species of beetle

Canthidium viridiobscurum is a species of beetle of the family Scarabaeidae. It is found in Brazil (Minas Gerais) and Peru.
