= Copris remotus =

Scientific classification
- Domain: Eukaryota
- Kingdom: Animalia
- Phylum: Arthropoda
- Class: Insecta
- Order: Coleoptera
- Suborder: Polyphaga
- Infraorder: Scarabaeiformia
- Family: Scarabaeidae
- Genus: Copris
- Species: C. remotus

Binomial name
- Copris remotus Leconte, 1866

Species of beetle

Copris remotus is a species of dung beetle in the family Scarabaeidae.

== Subspecies ==
These two subspecies belong to the species Copris remotus:

- Copris remotus dicyrtus Matthews and Halffter, 1959^{i c g}
- Copris remotus remotus LeConte, 1866^{i g}

Data sources: i = ITIS, c = Catalogue of Life, g = GBIF, b = Bugguide.net
