= Canthidium lentum =

Scientific classification
- Kingdom: Animalia
- Phylum: Arthropoda
- Clade: Pancrustacea
- Class: Insecta
- Order: Coleoptera
- Suborder: Polyphaga
- Infraorder: Scarabaeiformia
- Family: Scarabaeidae
- Genus: Canthidium
- Species: C. lentum

Binomial name
- Canthidium lentum Erichson, 1847

Species of beetle

Canthidium lentum is a species of beetle of the family Scarabaeidae. It is found in Ecuador, French Guiana and Peru.
