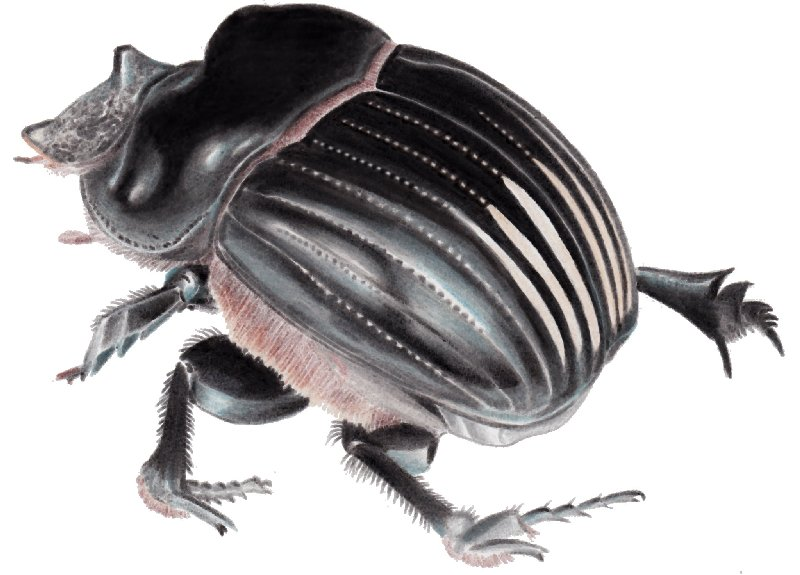

Scientific classification
- Kingdom: Animalia
- Phylum: Arthropoda
- Class: Insecta
- Order: Coleoptera
- Suborder: Polyphaga
- Infraorder: Scarabaeiformia
- Family: Scarabaeidae
- Genus: Dichotomius
- Species: D. carolinus

Binomial name
- Dichotomius carolinus (Linnaeus, 1767)

= Dichotomius carolinus =

Species of beetle

Dichotomius carolinus, the Carolina copris, is a species of dung beetle in the family Scarabaeidae.
