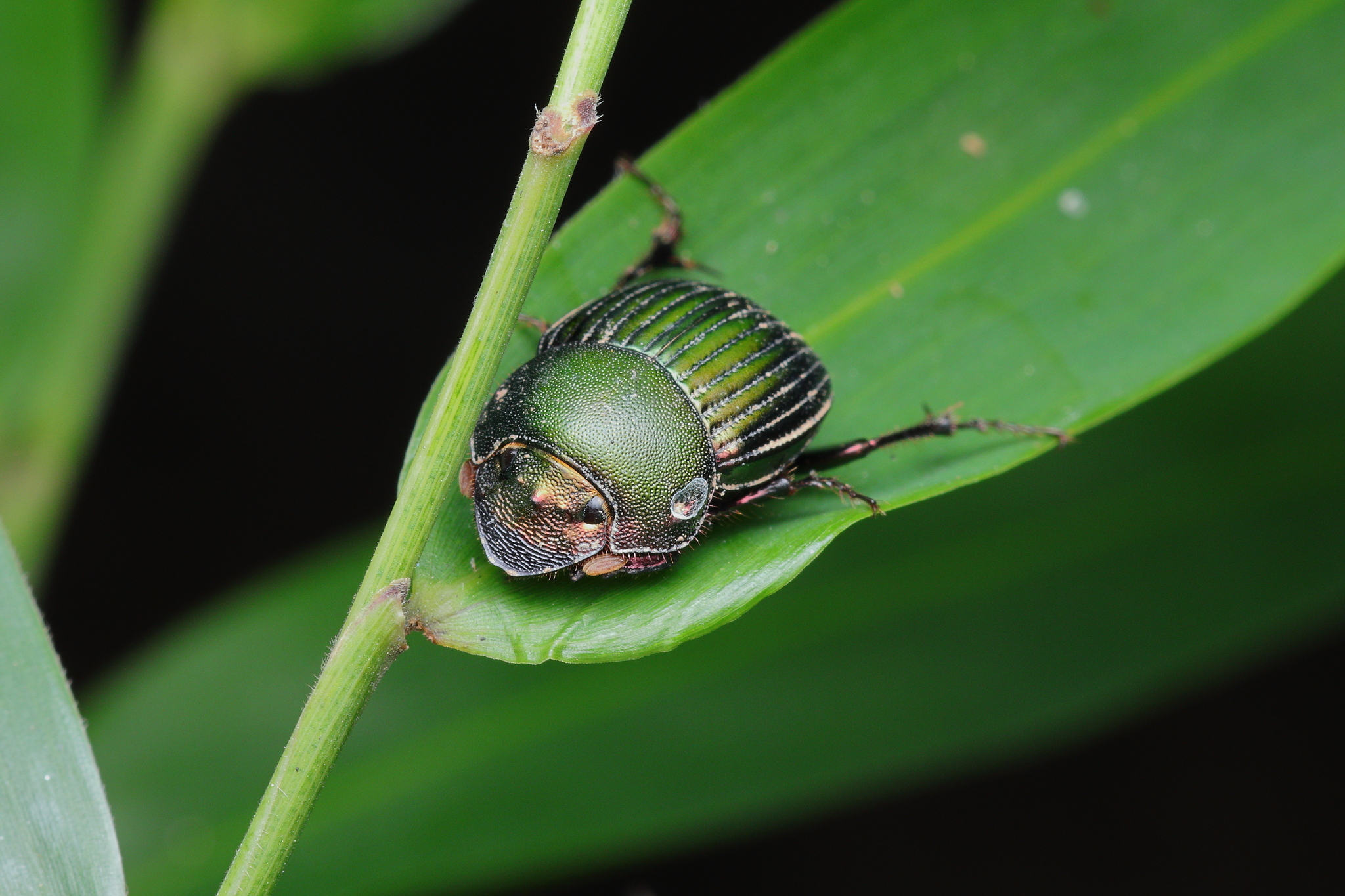
- Chalcocopris hesperus

Scientific classification
- Kingdom: Animalia
- Phylum: Arthropoda
- Clade: Pancrustacea
- Class: Insecta
- Order: Coleoptera
- Suborder: Polyphaga
- Infraorder: Scarabaeiformia
- Family: Scarabaeidae
- Tribe: Coprini
- Genus: Chalcocopris; Burmeister, 1846

= Chalcocopris =

Genus of beetles

Chalcocopris is a genus of Scarabaeidae or scarab beetle. It is known from South America.

== Species ==
There are two recognized species:

- Chalcocopris hesperus (Olivier, 1789)
- Chalcocopris inexpectatus Rossini & Vaz-de-Mello, 2015
