= Canthidium gerstaeckeri =

Scientific classification
- Kingdom: Animalia
- Phylum: Arthropoda
- Clade: Pancrustacea
- Class: Insecta
- Order: Coleoptera
- Suborder: Polyphaga
- Infraorder: Scarabaeiformia
- Family: Scarabaeidae
- Genus: Canthidium
- Species: C. gerstaeckeri

Binomial name
- Canthidium gerstaeckeri Harold, 1867

Species of beetle

Canthidium gerstaeckeri is a species of beetle of the family Scarabaeidae. It is found in Bolivia, Brazil (Acre), Colombia, French Guiana, Guyana, Peru and Suriname.
