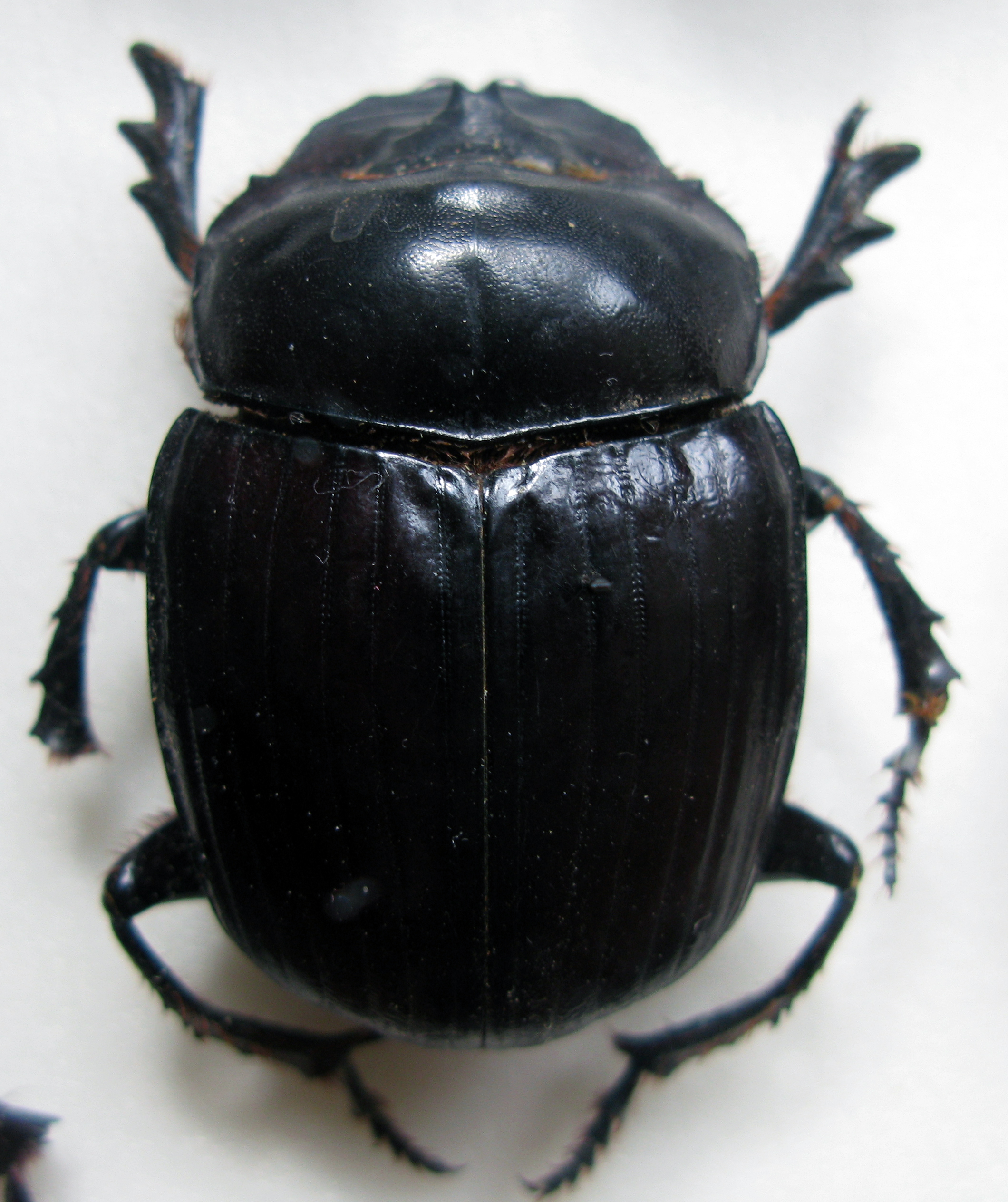
- Synapsis tmolus

Scientific classification
- Domain: Eukaryota
- Kingdom: Animalia
- Phylum: Arthropoda
- Class: Insecta
- Order: Coleoptera
- Suborder: Polyphaga
- Infraorder: Scarabaeiformia
- Family: Scarabaeidae
- Subfamily: Scarabaeinae
- Tribe: Coprini
- Genus: Synapsis; Bates, 1868

Synonyms
- Homalocopris Solsky, 1871

= Synapsis (beetle) =

Genus of Asian dung beetles

Synapsis is a genus of Asian dung beetles in the tribe Coprini, erected by Henry Walter Bates.

== Species ==
BioLib lists:

1. Synapsis birmanicus Gillet, 1907
2. Synapsis boonlongi Hanboonsong & Masumoto, 1999
3. Synapsis brahminus (Hope, 1831)
4. Synapsis davidis Fairmaire, 1878
5. Synapsis dickinsoni Hanboonsong & Masumoto, 1999
6. Synapsis gilleti Arrow, 1931
7. Synapsis horaki Zidek & Pokorny, 2010
8. Synapsis kiuchii Hanboonsong & Masumoto, 1999
9. Synapsis masumotoi Ochi, 1992
10. Synapsis naxiorum Kral & Rejsek, 2000
11. Synapsis ochii Masumoto, 1995
12. Synapsis ovalis Boucomont, 1920
13. Synapsis puluongensis Bui & Bonkowski, 2018
14. Synapsis punctatus Ochi, Kon & Kawahara, 2008
15. Synapsis ritsemae Lansberge, 1874
16. Synapsis roslihashimi Ochi, Kon & Kawahara, 2008
17. Synapsis satoi Ochi & Kon, 2007
18. Synapsis simplex Sharp, 1875
19. Synapsis strnadi Kral, 2002
20. Synapsis tmolus (Fischer von Waldheim, 1821)
21. Synapsis tridens Sharp, 1881
22. Synapsis vietnamicus Ochi, Kon & Pham, 2020
23. Synapsis yama Gillet, 1911
24. Synapsis yunnanus Arrow, 1933
