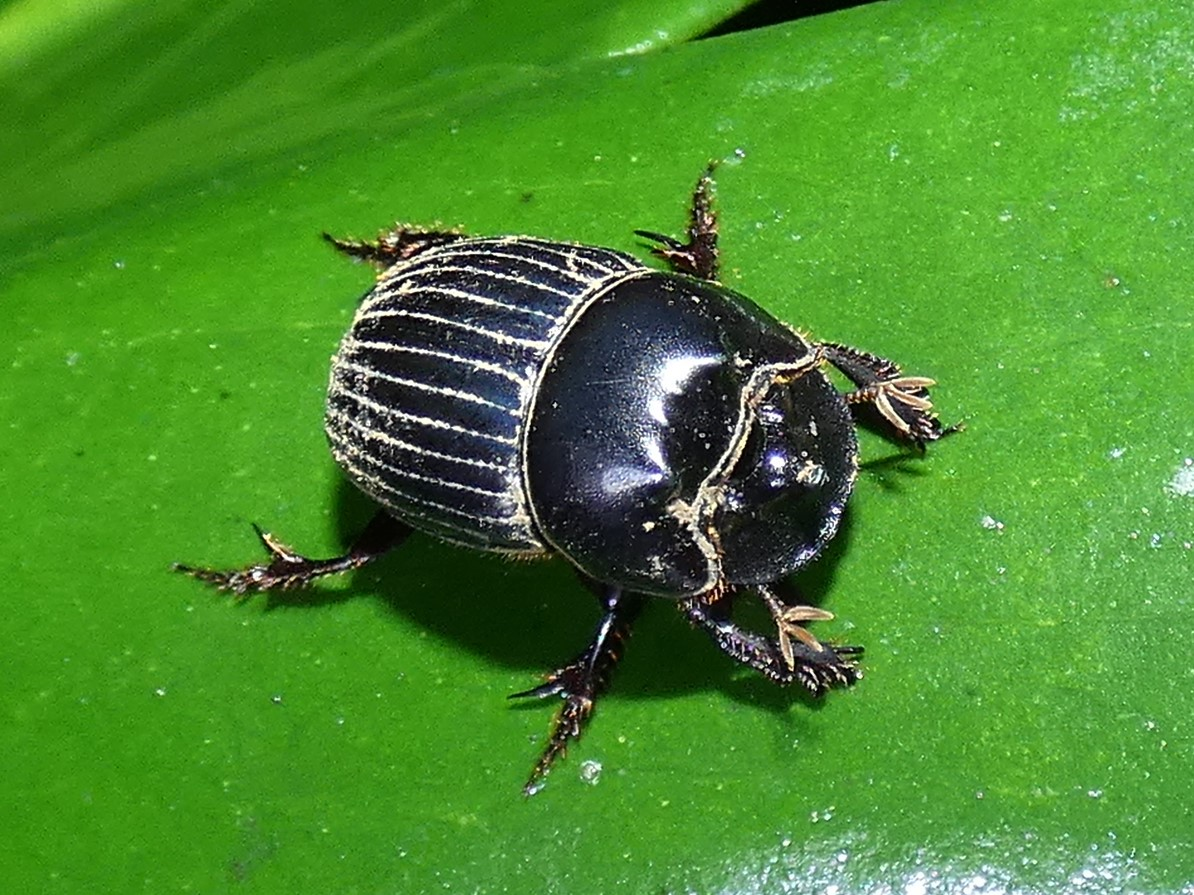
- Ontherus lunicollis

Scientific classification
- Kingdom: Animalia
- Phylum: Arthropoda
- Clade: Pancrustacea
- Class: Insecta
- Order: Coleoptera
- Suborder: Polyphaga
- Infraorder: Scarabaeiformia
- Family: Scarabaeidae
- Tribe: Coprini
- Genus: Ontherus; Erichson, 1847

= Ontherus =

Genus of beetles

Ontherus is a genus of Scarabaeidae or scarab beetles in the superfamily Scarabaeoidea.

== List of species ==
- Ontherus aequatorius Bates, 1891
- Ontherus alexis Blanchard, 1846
- Ontherus amplector Génier, 1996
- Ontherus androgynus Génier, 1996
- Ontherus aphodioides Burmeister, 1874
- Ontherus appendiculatus Mannerheim, 1829
- Ontherus ashei Génier, 1996
- Ontherus atlantidis Génier, 1996
- Ontherus azteca Harold, 1869
- Ontherus brevicollis Kirsch, 1870
- Ontherus brevipennis Harold, 1867
- Ontherus bridgesi Waterhouse, 1891
- Ontherus cambeforti Génier, 1996
- Ontherus carinicollis Luederwaldt, 1930
- Ontherus carinifrons Luederwaldt, 1930
- Ontherus cephalotes Harold, 1869
- Ontherus compressicornis Luederwaldt, 1931
- Ontherus dentatus Luederwaldt, 1930
- Ontherus diabolicus Génier, 1996
- Ontherus digitatus Harold, 1868
- Ontherus edentulus Génier, 1996
- Ontherus elegans Luederwaldt, 1930
- Ontherus erosioides Luederwaldt, 1930
- Ontherus erosus Harold, 1875
- Ontherus felicitae González & Medina, 2015
- Ontherus gilli Génier, 1996
- Ontherus gladiator Génier, 1998
- Ontherus grandis Luederwaldt, 1931
- Ontherus hadros Génier, 1996
- Ontherus howdeni Génier, 1996
- Ontherus incisus Kirsch, 1870
- Ontherus insolitus Génier, 1996
- Ontherus irinus Balthasar, 1938
- Ontherus kirschii Harold, 1867
- Ontherus laminifer Balthasar, 1938
- Ontherus lichyi Martinez, 1947
- Ontherus lobifrons Génier, 1996
- Ontherus lunicollis Génier, 1996
- Ontherus magnus Génier, 1996
- Ontherus mexicanus Harold, 1868
- Ontherus monilistriatus Génier, 1996
- Ontherus obliquus Génier, 1996
- Ontherus pilatus Génier, 1996
- Ontherus planus Génier, 1996
- Ontherus podiceps Harold, 1868
- Ontherus politus Génier, 1996
- Ontherus pseudodidymus Génier, 1996
- Ontherus pubens Génier, 1996
- Ontherus raptor Génier, 1996
- Ontherus rectangulidens Génier, 1996
- Ontherus rectus Génier, 1996
- Ontherus sanctaemartae Génier, 1996
- Ontherus sextuberculatus Génier, 1996
- Ontherus stridulator Génier, 1996
- Ontherus sulcator Fabricius, 1775
- Ontherus tenuistriatus Génier, 1996
- Ontherus trituberculatus Balthasar, 1938
- Ontherus ulcopygus Génier, 1996
- Ontherus virescens Lucas, 1859
- Ontherus zikani Luederwaldt, 1930
