= Copris lecontei =

Scientific classification
- Domain: Eukaryota
- Kingdom: Animalia
- Phylum: Arthropoda
- Class: Insecta
- Order: Coleoptera
- Suborder: Polyphaga
- Infraorder: Scarabaeiformia
- Family: Scarabaeidae
- Genus: Copris
- Species: C. lecontei

Binomial name
- Copris lecontei Matthews, 1962

Species of beetle

Copris lecontei is a species of dung beetle in the family Scarabaeidae.

== Subspecies ==
These two subspecies belong to the species Copris lecontei:

- Copris lecontei isthmiensis Matthews, 1961
- Copris lecontei lecontei Matthews, 1962
