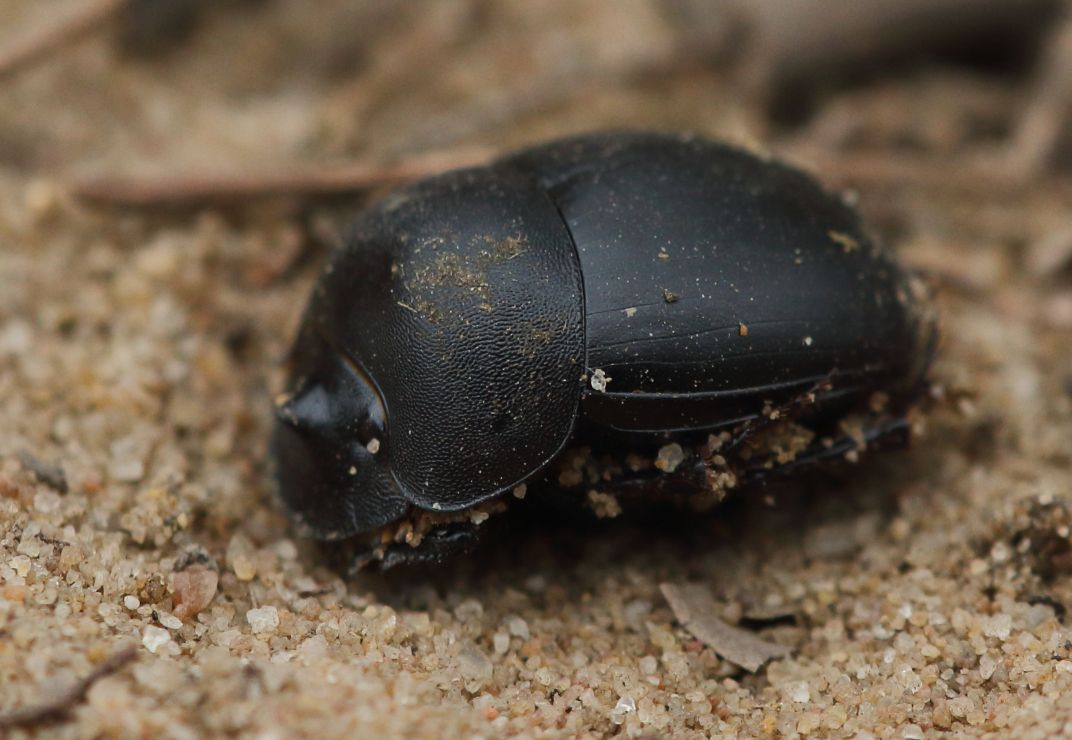
- Metacatharsius opacus

Scientific classification
- Kingdom: Animalia
- Phylum: Arthropoda
- Class: Insecta
- Order: Coleoptera
- Suborder: Polyphaga
- Infraorder: Scarabaeiformia
- Family: Scarabaeidae
- Tribe: Coprini
- Genus: Metacatharsius; Paulian, 1939

= Metacatharsius =

Genus of beetles

Metacatharsius is a genus of dung beetles in the tribe Coprini (subfamily Scarabaeinae) of the scarab family. It comprises more than 60 species from Africa; one is also found in Arabia, and Pakistan.

== Habitat ==
These dung beetles are found mainly in savanna with deep sandy soils.
