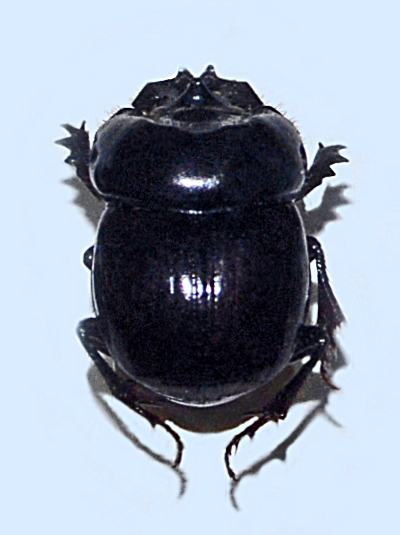

Scientific classification
- Domain: Eukaryota
- Kingdom: Animalia
- Phylum: Arthropoda
- Class: Insecta
- Order: Coleoptera
- Suborder: Polyphaga
- Infraorder: Scarabaeiformia
- Family: Scarabaeidae
- Tribe: Coprini
- Genus: Dichotomius; Hope, 1838

Synonyms
- List: Brachycopris Haldeman, 1848; Homocopris Burmeister, 1842; Pinotus Erichson, 1847; Pseudoheliocopris Ferriera, 1970; Selenocopris Burmeister, 1842

= Dichotomius =

Genus of beetles

Dichotomius is a genus of Scarabaeidae or scarab beetles in the superfamily Scarabaeoidea.

== Species ==
- Dichotomius abayoyensis
- Dichotomius acuticornis
- Dichotomius adrastus
- Dichotomius affinis
- Dichotomius agenor
- Dichotomius agesilaus
- Dichotomius alutaceus
- Dichotomius alyattes
- Dichotomius amicitiae
- Dichotomius amplicollis
- Dichotomius annae
- Dichotomius anthrax
- Dichotomius apicalis
- Dichotomius ascanius
- Dichotomius assifer
- Dichotomius batesi
- Dichotomius bechynei
- Dichotomius belus
- Dichotomius bicornis
- Dichotomius bicuspis
- Dichotomius bitiensis
- Dichotomius boreus
- Dichotomius borgmeieri
- Dichotomius bos
- Dichotomius bosqui
- Dichotomius bucki
- Dichotomius buqueti
- Dichotomius calcaratus
- Dichotomius camargoi
- Dichotomius camposeabrai
- Dichotomius carbonarius
- Dichotomius carinatus
- Dichotomius carolinus
- Dichotomius centralis
- Dichotomius coenosus
- Dichotomius colonicus
- Dichotomius comarapensis
- Dichotomius conicollis
- Dichotomius costaricensis
- Dichotomius cotopaxi
- Dichotomius crinicollis
- Dichotomius cuprinus
- Dichotomius dahli
- Dichotomius danieli
- Dichotomius depressicollis
- Dichotomius deyrollei
- Dichotomius diabolicus
- Dichotomius dynastus
- Dichotomius enrietti
- Dichotomius eucranioides
- Dichotomius fallax
- Dichotomius favi
- Dichotomius femoratus
- Dichotomius fimbriatus
- Dichotomius fissiceps
- Dichotomius fissus
- Dichotomius fonsecae
- Dichotomius fortestriatus
- Dichotomius gamboaensis
- Dichotomius geminatus
- Dichotomius glaucus
- Dichotomius globulus
- Dichotomius guaranii
- Dichotomius haroldi
- Dichotomius hempeli
- Dichotomius horridus
- Dichotomius horvathi
- Dichotomius imitator
- Dichotomius inachoides
- Dichotomius inachus
- Dichotomius inflaticollis
- Dichotomius ingens
- Dichotomius interstitialis
- Dichotomius irinus
- Dichotomius joelus
- Dichotomius laevicollis
- Dichotomius latistriatus
- Dichotomius longiceps
- Dichotomius lucasi
- Dichotomius luctuosioides
- Dichotomius luctuosus
- Dichotomius lycas
- Dichotomius machadoi
- Dichotomius mamillatus
- Dichotomius maya
- Dichotomius melzeri
- Dichotomius micans
- Dichotomius missionus
- Dichotomius monstrosus
- Dichotomius mormon
- Dichotomius motai
- Dichotomius mundus
- Dichotomius muticus
- Dichotomius mysticus
- Dichotomius nemoricola
- Dichotomius nevermanni
- Dichotomius nimuendaju
- Dichotomius nisus
- Dichotomius nitidissimus
- Dichotomius nobilis
- Dichotomius nutans
- Dichotomius ocellatopunctatus
- Dichotomius ohausi
- Dichotomius opacipennis
- Dichotomius opalescens
- Dichotomius paraguayanus
- Dichotomius parcepunctatus
- Dichotomius pauloensis
- Dichotomius planicollis
- Dichotomius podalirius
- Dichotomius prietoi
- Dichotomius problematicus
- Dichotomius protectus
- Dichotomius provisorius
- Dichotomius punctatostriatus
- Dichotomius puncticollis
- Dichotomius punctulatipennis
- Dichotomius pygidialis
- Dichotomius quadraticeps
- Dichotomius quadrinodosus
- Dichotomius quinquedens
- Dichotomius quinquelobatus
- Dichotomius reclinatus
- Dichotomius ribeiroi
- Dichotomius robustus
- Dichotomius rodrigoi
- Dichotomius rotundatus
- Dichotomius rotundigena
- Dichotomius rugatus
- Dichotomius rugosicollis
- Dichotomius rugosipennis
- Dichotomius sagittarius
- Dichotomius satanas
- Dichotomius schiffleri
- Dichotomius semiaeneus
- Dichotomius semisquamosus
- Dichotomius sericeus
- Dichotomius sexdentatus
- Dichotomius simplex
- Dichotomius simplicicornis
- Dichotomius simulans
- Dichotomius singularis
- Dichotomius smaragdinus
- Dichotomius spadiceus
- Dichotomius speciosus
- Dichotomius subaeneus
- Dichotomius superbus
- Dichotomius telamon
- Dichotomius texanus
- Dichotomius triangulariceps
- Dichotomius triquetrus
- Dichotomius tristis
- Dichotomius validipilosus
- Dichotomius vidaurrei
- Dichotomius virescens
- Dichotomius worontzowi
- Dichotomius yucatanus
- Dichotomius zikani
