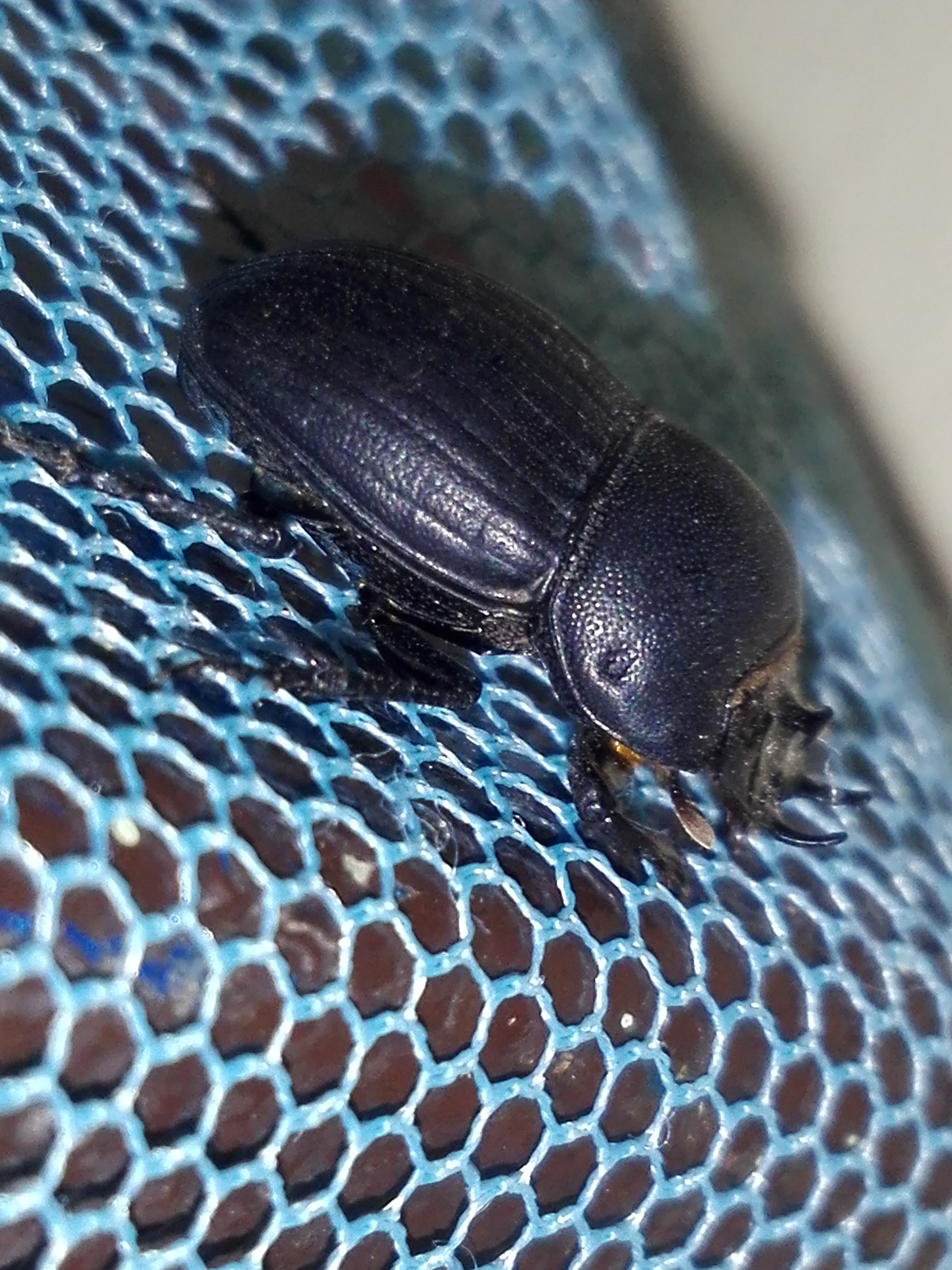
- Adult in Trincomalee, Sri Lanka

Scientific classification
- Kingdom: Animalia
- Phylum: Arthropoda
- Class: Insecta
- Order: Coleoptera
- Suborder: Polyphaga
- Infraorder: Scarabaeiformia
- Family: Scarabaeidae
- Genus: Copris
- Species: C. signatus

Binomial name
- Copris signatus Walker, 1858

= Copris signatus =

Species of beetle

Copris signatus, is a species of dung beetle found in India, Sri Lanka and Laos.

== Description ==
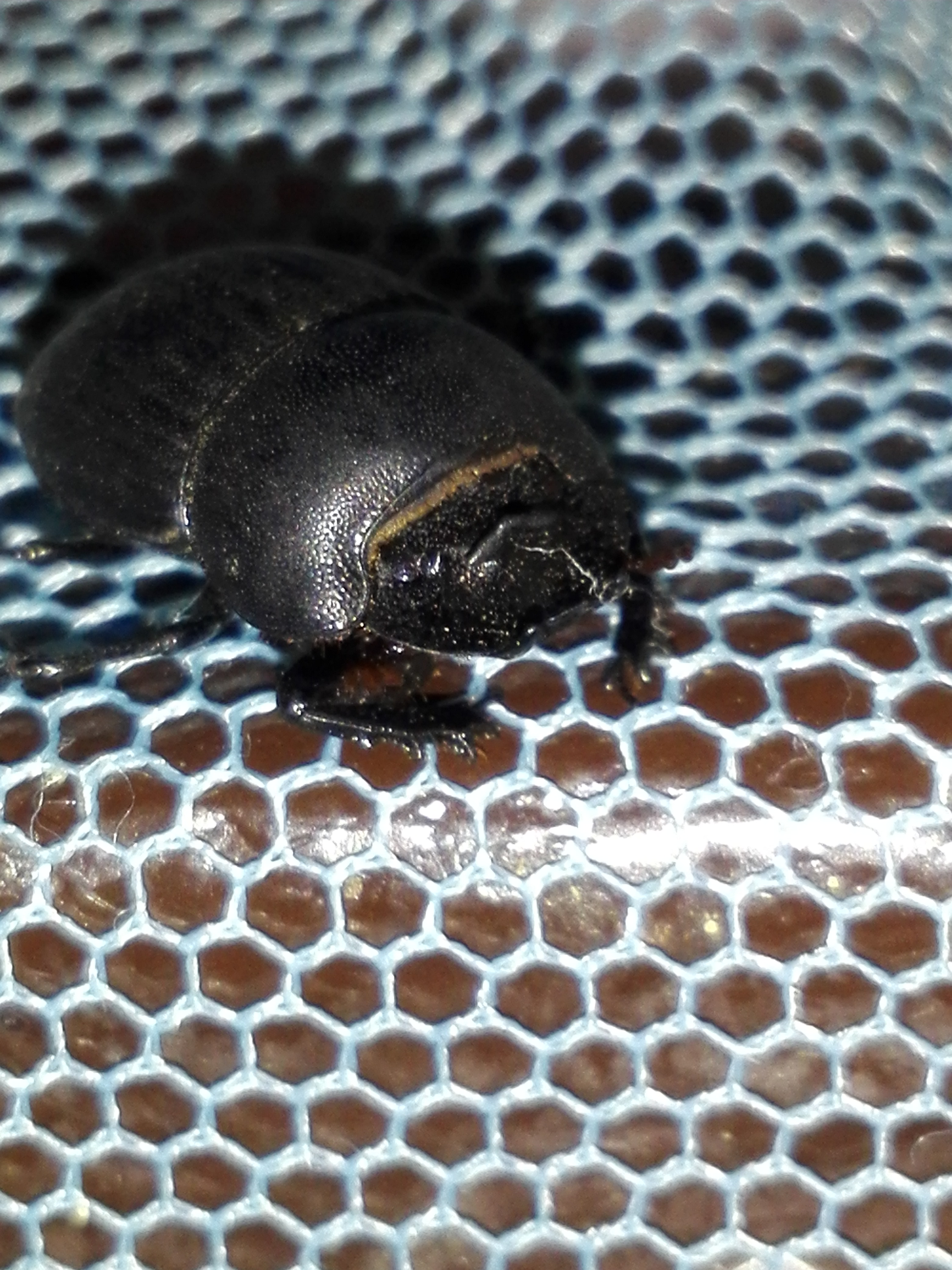
Anterior view (front view) in Trincomalee, Sri Lanka

The species has an average length of about 10–16 millimetres (0.39–0.63 in)

Adults are observed from old elephant dungs, and cow dungs.
