= Copris sodalis =

Scientific classification
- Kingdom: Animalia
- Phylum: Arthropoda
- Class: Insecta
- Order: Coleoptera
- Suborder: Polyphaga
- Infraorder: Scarabaeiformia
- Family: Scarabaeidae
- Genus: Copris
- Species: C. sodalis

Binomial name
- Copris sodalis Walker, 1858

Synonyms
- Copris taprobanus Gillet, 1910

Species of beetle

Copris sodalis, is a species of dung beetle found in India, and Sri Lanka.
