= Canthidium cupreum =

Scientific classification
- Kingdom: Animalia
- Phylum: Arthropoda
- Clade: Pancrustacea
- Class: Insecta
- Order: Coleoptera
- Suborder: Polyphaga
- Infraorder: Scarabaeiformia
- Family: Scarabaeidae
- Genus: Canthidium
- Species: C. cupreum

Binomial name
- Canthidium cupreum (Blanchard, 1845)

Synonyms
- Choeridium cupreum Blanchard, 1845

Species of beetle

Canthidium cupreum is a species of beetle of the family Scarabaeidae. It is found in Argentina, Bolivia, Brazil (Amazonas), Colombia, Paraguay and Peru.
