= Dichotomius melzeri =

Scientific classification
- Kingdom: Animalia
- Phylum: Arthropoda
- Clade: Pancrustacea
- Class: Insecta
- Order: Coleoptera
- Suborder: Polyphaga
- Infraorder: Scarabaeiformia
- Family: Scarabaeidae
- Genus: Dichotomius
- Species: D. melzeri

Binomial name
- Dichotomius melzeri (Luederwaldt, 1922)

Synonyms
- Pinotus melzeri Luederwaldt, 1922; Pinotus depressicollis latilobatus Luederwaldt, 1931

Species of beetle

Dichotomius melzeri is a species of beetle of the family Scarabaeidae. It is found in Bolivia, Brazil (Acre, Amazonas, Maranhão, Mato Grosso, Mato Grosso do Sul, Pará, Rondônia, São Paulo), Colombia, Peru and Suriname.
