= Dichotomius mamillatus =

Scientific classification
- Kingdom: Animalia
- Phylum: Arthropoda
- Clade: Pancrustacea
- Class: Insecta
- Order: Coleoptera
- Suborder: Polyphaga
- Infraorder: Scarabaeiformia
- Family: Scarabaeidae
- Genus: Dichotomius
- Species: D. mamillatus

Binomial name
- Dichotomius mamillatus (Felsche, 1901)

Synonyms
- Pinotus mamillatus Felsche, 1901; Pinotus calcaratus Arrow, 1913

Species of beetle

Dichotomius mamillatus is a species of beetle of the family Scarabaeidae. It is found in Bolivia, Brazil (Acre, Amapá, Amazonas, Mato Grosso, Rondônia, Roraima), Colombia, Ecuador, French Guiana, Guyana, Peru, Suriname and Venezuela.
