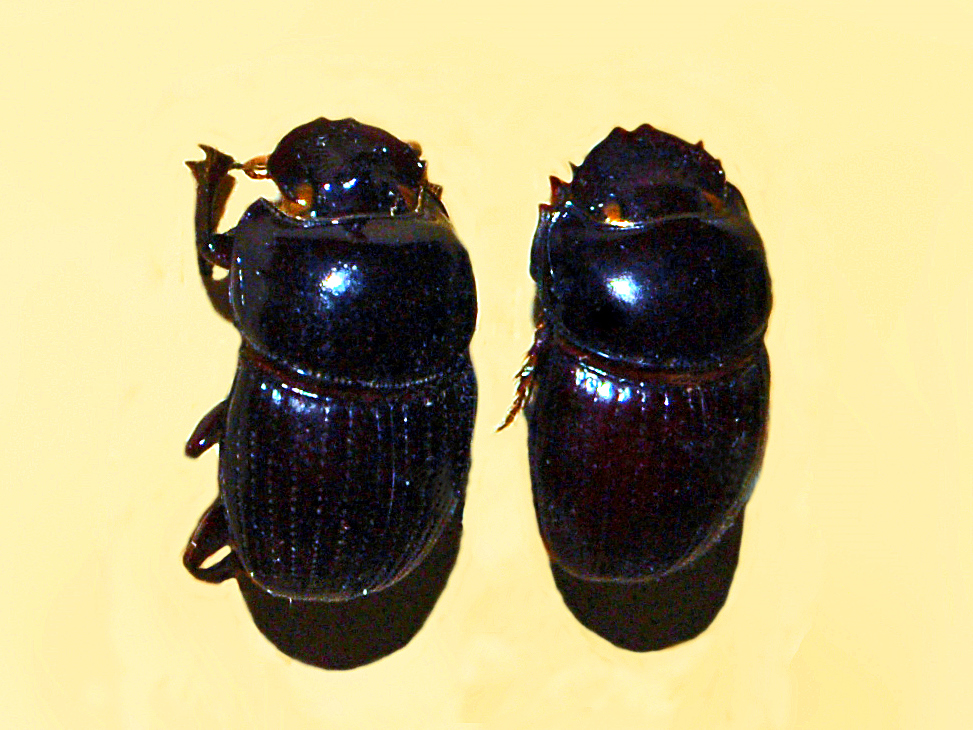
- In Australia

Scientific classification
- Domain: Eukaryota
- Kingdom: Animalia
- Phylum: Arthropoda
- Class: Insecta
- Order: Coleoptera
- Suborder: Polyphaga
- Infraorder: Scarabaeiformia
- Family: Scarabaeidae
- Genus: Coptodactyla
- Species: C. glabricollis

Binomial name
- Coptodactyla glabricollis (Hope, 1842)

Synonyms
- Copris glabricollis Hope, 1842

= Coptodactyla glabricollis =

Species of beetle

Coptodactyla glabricollis is a dung rhinoceros beetle of the family Scarabaeidae.

== Description ==
Coptodactyla glabricollis reaches about 11–17 millimetres (0.43–0.67 in) in length. The basic colour is black or dark brown. Pronotum and elytra are strongly convex. Males have a small erect horn in the front of the head. Elytra are striated, with small punctures. Larvae are coprophagous.

== Distribution ==
This species occurs in Australia (Northern Territory, Queensland, and Western Australia) and Papua New Guinea.
