= Copris minutus =

Scientific classification
- Domain: Eukaryota
- Kingdom: Animalia
- Phylum: Arthropoda
- Class: Insecta
- Order: Coleoptera
- Suborder: Polyphaga
- Infraorder: Scarabaeiformia
- Family: Scarabaeidae
- Genus: Copris
- Species: C. minutus

Binomial name
- Copris minutus (Drury, 1773)

Synonyms
- Copris reflexus Panzer, 1794; Scarabaeus ammon Fabricius, 1781; Scarabaeus lar Fabricius, 1787; Scarabaeus silenus Fabricius, 1775

Species of beetle

Copris minutus, the small black dung beetle, is a species of dung beetle in the family Scarabaeidae. It is found in North America.
