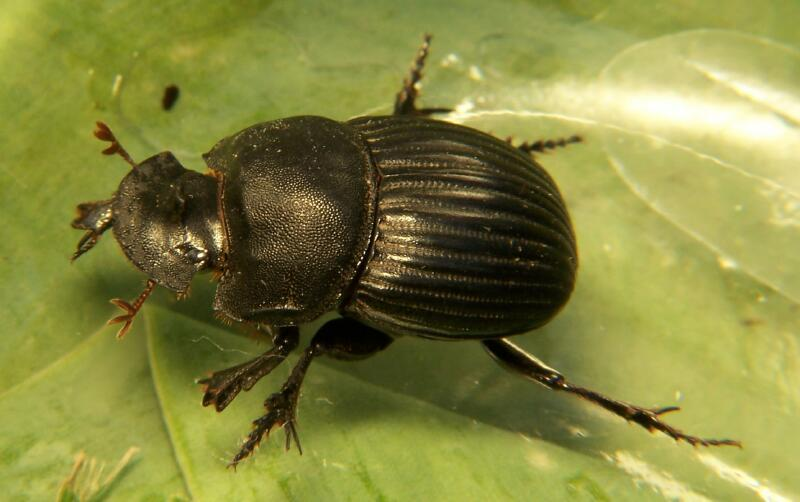

Scientific classification
- Kingdom: Animalia
- Phylum: Arthropoda
- Clade: Pancrustacea
- Class: Insecta
- Order: Coleoptera
- Suborder: Polyphaga
- Infraorder: Scarabaeiformia
- Family: Scarabaeidae
- Genus: Copris
- Species: C. fricator

Binomial name
- Copris fricator (Fabricius, 1787)

Synonyms
- Copris anaglypticus Olivier, 1789; Copris cartwrighti Say, 1823; Scarabaeus tullius Robinson, 1941

= Copris fricator =

Species of beetle

Copris fricator is a species of dung beetle in the family Scarabaeidae.
