= Copridaspidus =

Scientific classification
- Kingdom: Animalia
- Phylum: Arthropoda
- Clade: Pancrustacea
- Class: Insecta
- Order: Coleoptera
- Suborder: Polyphaga
- Infraorder: Scarabaeiformia
- Family: Scarabaeidae
- Genus: Copridaspidus; Boucomont, 1920
- Species: C. peregrinus

Binomial name
- Copridaspidus peregrinus (Harold, 1878)

Synonyms
- Catharsius peregrinus Harold, 1878; Copridaspidus favareli Boucomont, 1920

Genus of beetles

Copridaspidus is a monotypic genus of Scarabaeidae or scarab beetles. The sole species is Copridaspidus peregrinus. It is known from Sub-Saharan Africa.
