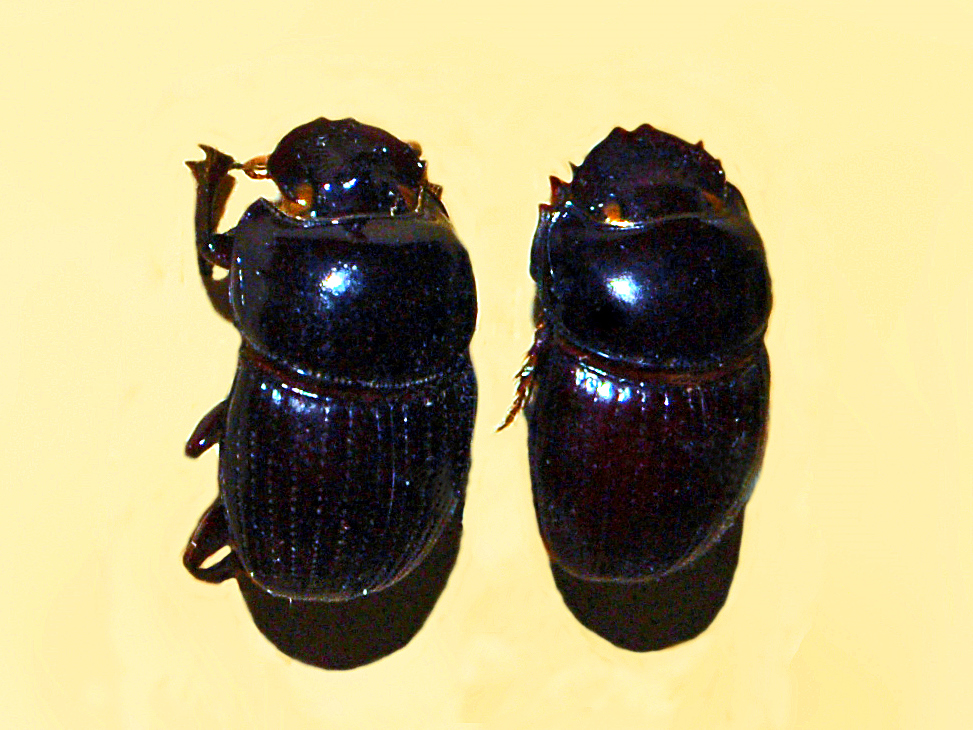
- Coptodactyla glabricollis in Australia

Scientific classification
- Kingdom: Animalia
- Phylum: Arthropoda
- Class: Insecta
- Order: Coleoptera
- Suborder: Polyphaga
- Infraorder: Scarabaeiformia
- Family: Scarabaeidae
- Genus: Coptodactyla; Burmeister, 1846

Synonyms
- Boucomontia Paulian, 1933

= Coptodactyla =

Genus of beetles

Coptodactyla is a genus of Scarabaeidae or scarab beetles.

== List of Species ==
- Coptodactyla brooksi Matthews, 1976
- Coptodactyla depressa Paulian, 1933
- Coptodactyla ducalis Blackburn, 1903
- Coptodactyla glabricollis Hope, 1842
- Coptodactyla lesnei Paulian, 1933
- Coptodactyla matthewsi Reid, 2000
- Coptodactyla merdeka Reid, 2000
- Coptodactyla meridionalis Matthews, 1976
- Coptodactyla monstrosa Felsche, 1909
- Coptodactyla nitida Paulian, 1933
- Coptodactyla onitoides Gillet, 1925
- Coptodactyla papua Lansberge, 1885
- Coptodactyla stereocera Gillet, 1911
- Coptodactyla storeyi Reid, 2000
- Coptodactyla subaenea Harold, 1877
- Coptodactyla torresica Mathews, 1976
- Coptodactyla tuberculata Gillet, 1925
