= Canthidium =

- Canthidium decoratum

Scientific classification
- Kingdom: Animalia
- Phylum: Arthropoda
- Clade: Pancrustacea
- Class: Insecta
- Order: Coleoptera
- Suborder: Polyphaga
- Infraorder: Scarabaeiformia
- Family: Scarabaeidae
- Tribe: Coprini
- Genus: Canthidium; Erichson, 1847

Diversity
- Over 170 species

Genus of beetles

Canthidium is a genus of dung beetles in the family Scarabaeidae. There are 179 accepted species in Canthidium.

== See also ==
- List of Canthidium species
