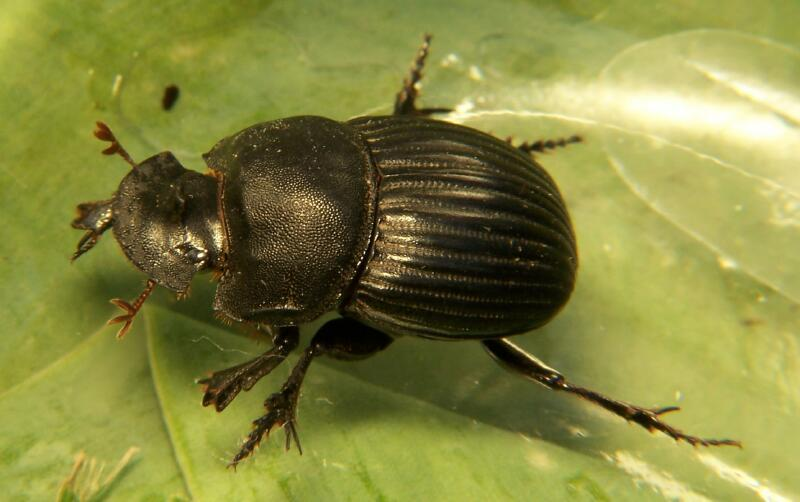
- Copris fricator

Scientific classification
- Kingdom: Animalia
- Phylum: Arthropoda
- Clade: Pancrustacea
- Class: Insecta
- Order: Coleoptera
- Suborder: Polyphaga
- Infraorder: Scarabaeiformia
- Family: Scarabaeidae
- Subfamily: Scarabaeinae
- Tribe: Coprini
- Genus: Copris; Geoffroy, 1762

Synonyms
- Paracopris Balthasar, 1939

= Copris =

Genus of dung beetles

Copris is a genus of dung beetles in the tribe Coprini (subfamily Scarabaeinae) of the scarab family. It comprises more than 250 tunnelling species and has an almost worldwide distribution.

== Gallery ==
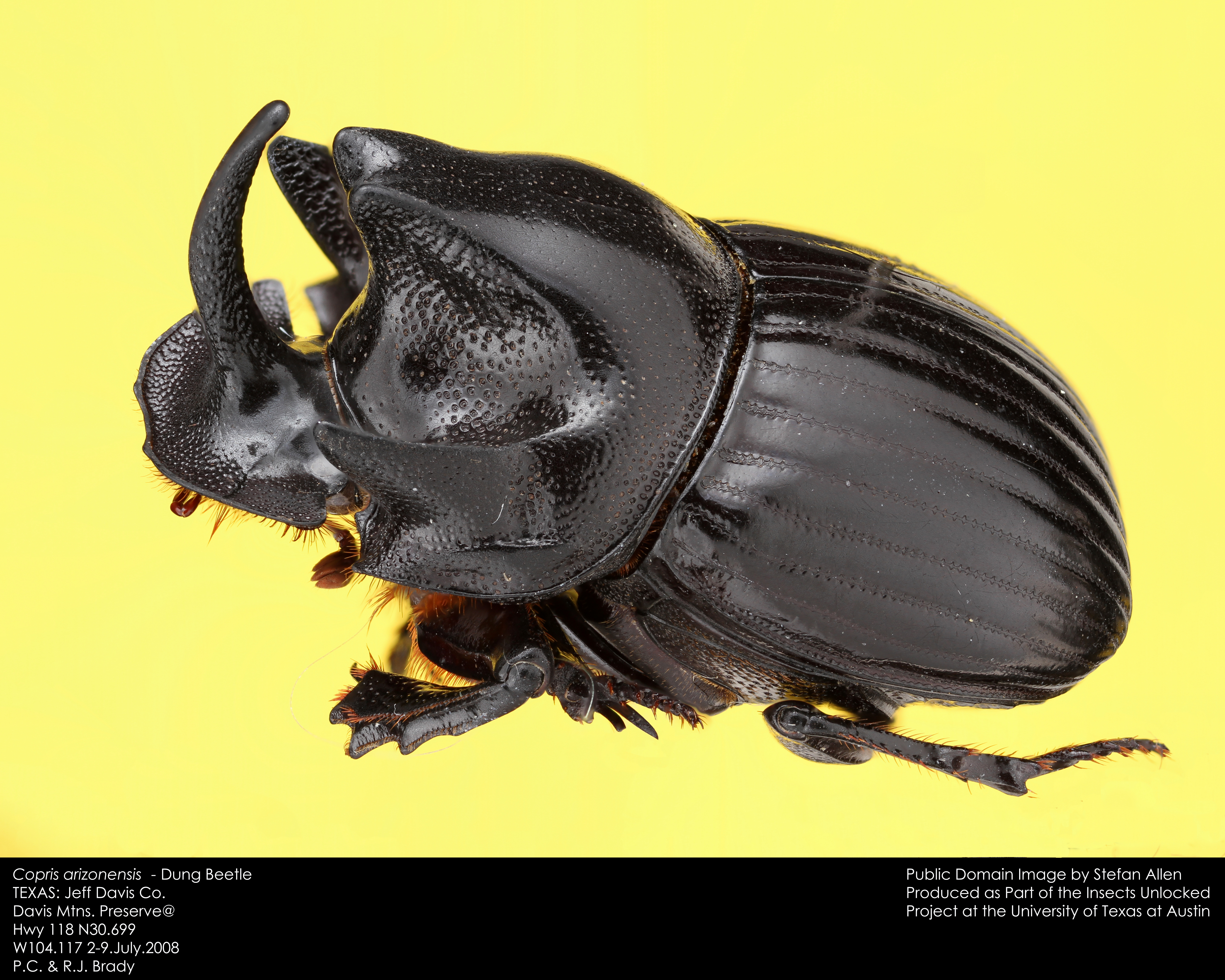
C. arizonensis Schaeffer, 1906

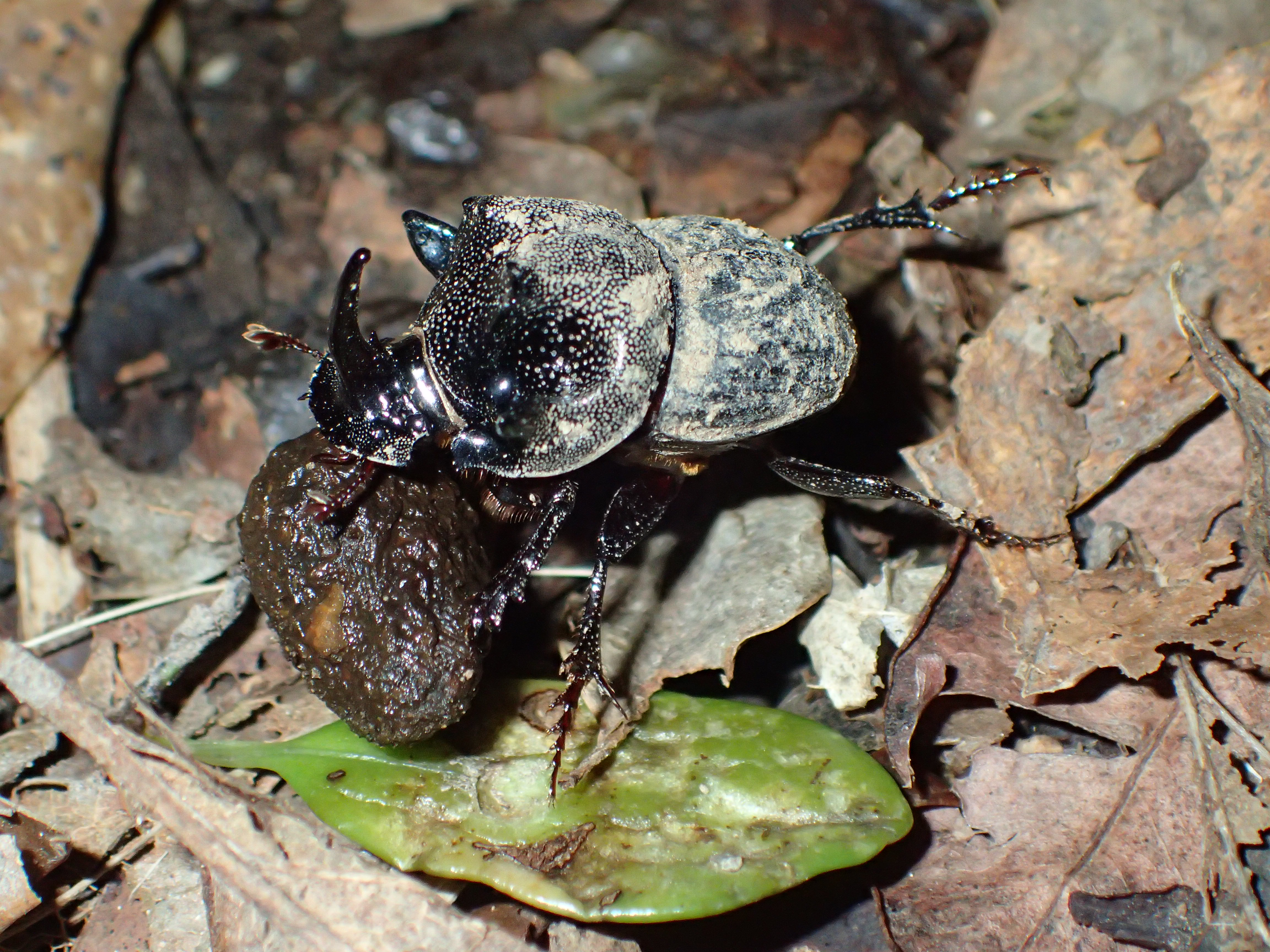
C. brachypterus Nomura,1964

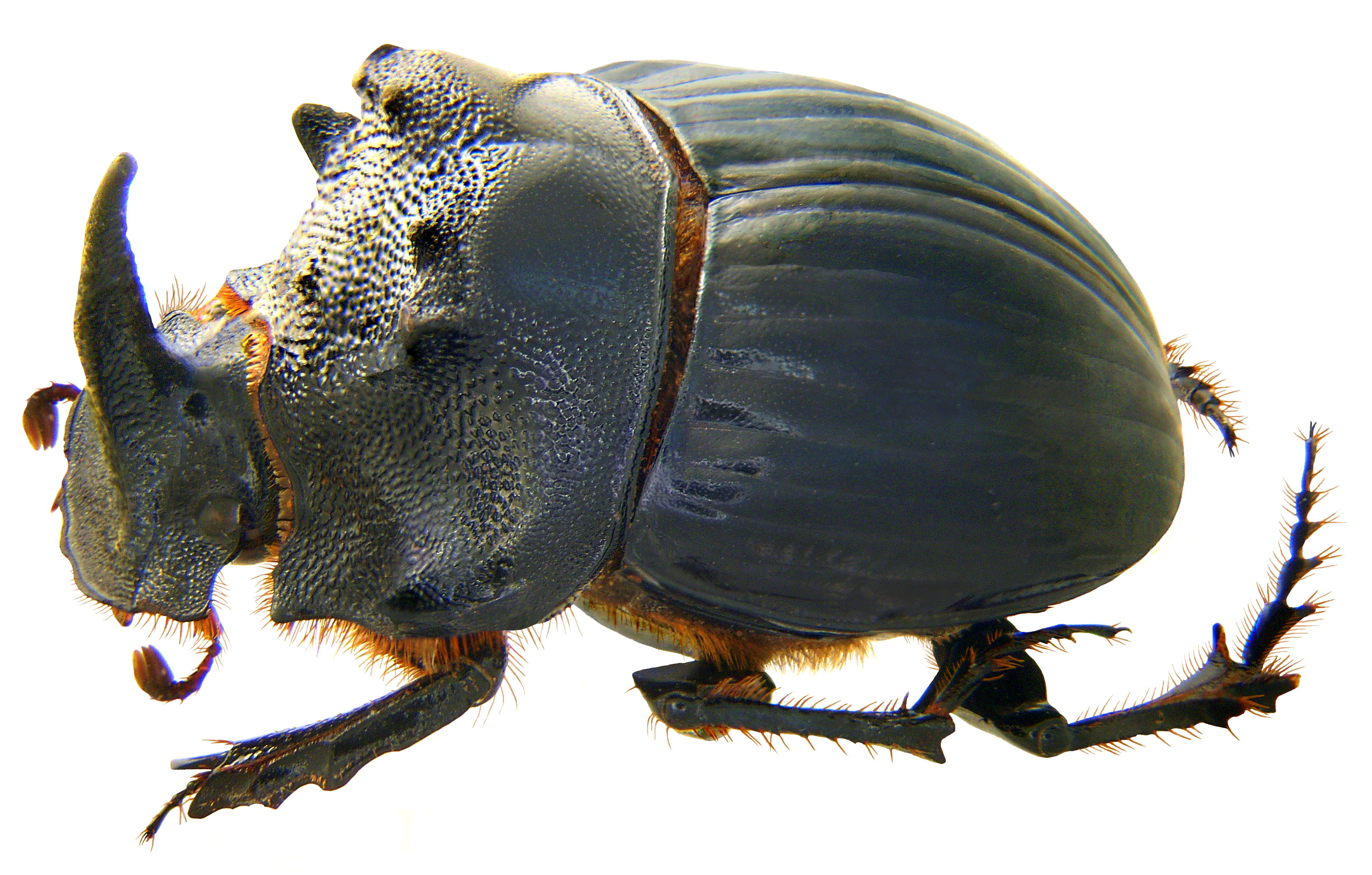
C. elphenor Klug, 1855

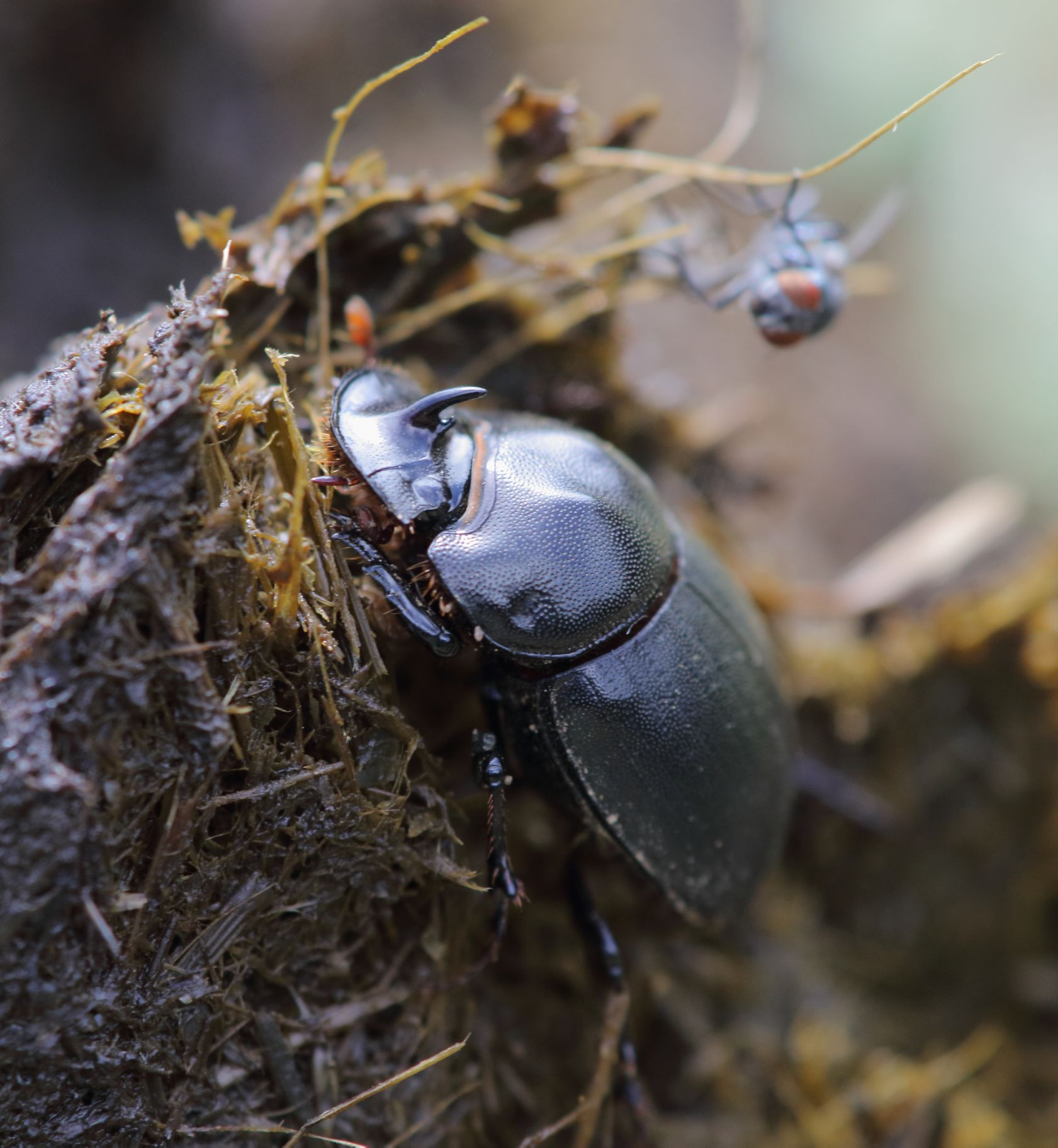
C. fidius (Olivier, 1789)

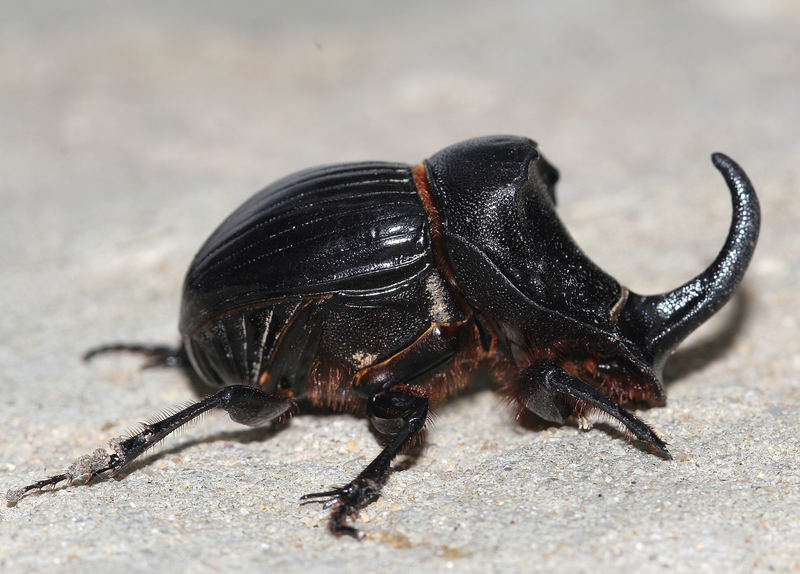
C. hispanus (Linnaeus, 1764)

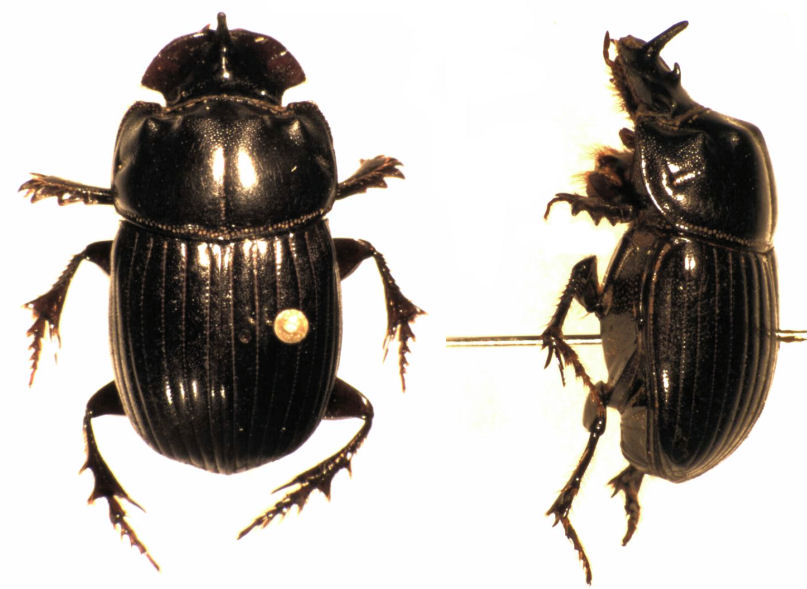
C. incertus Say, 1835

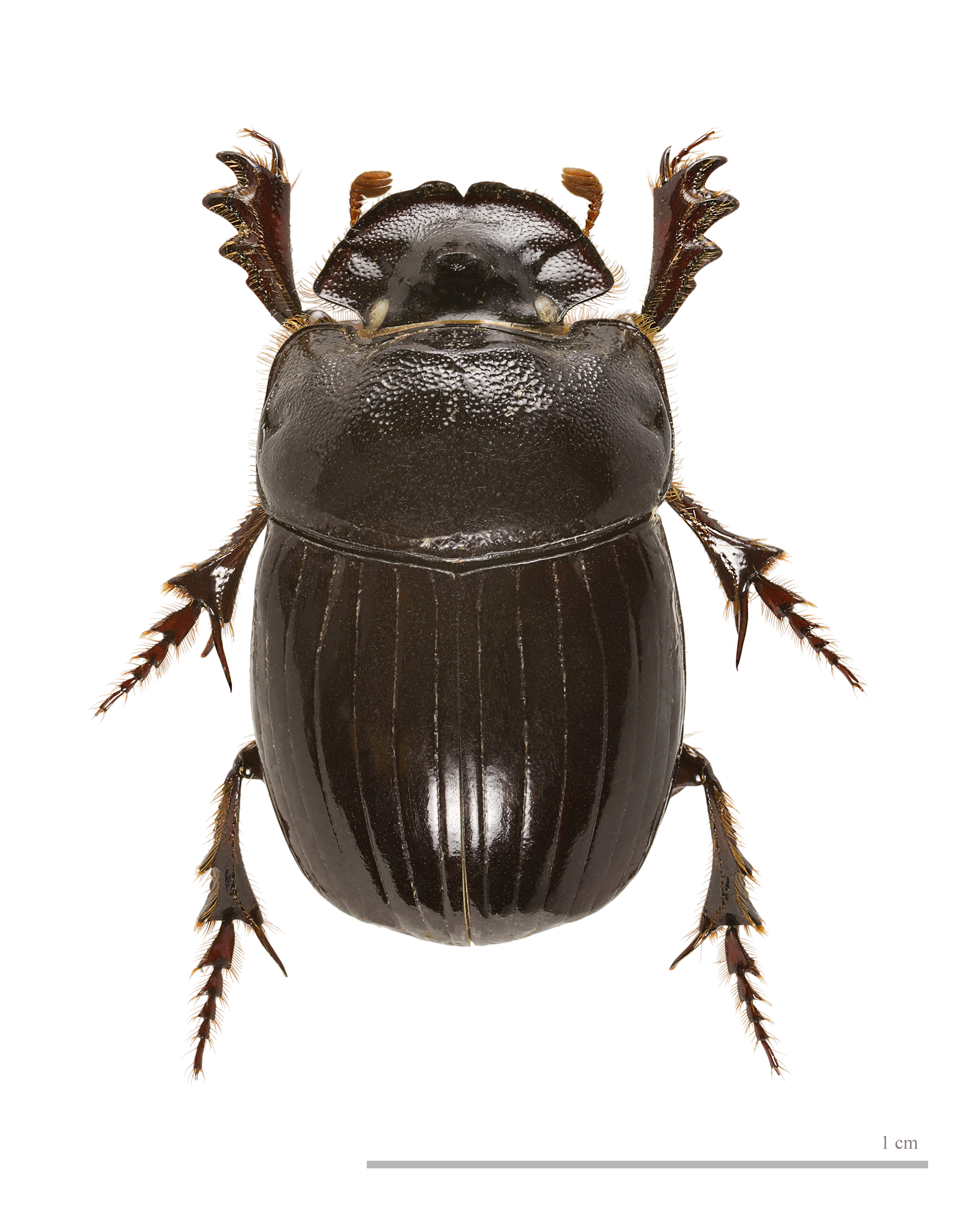
C. lunaris (Linnaeus, 1758)

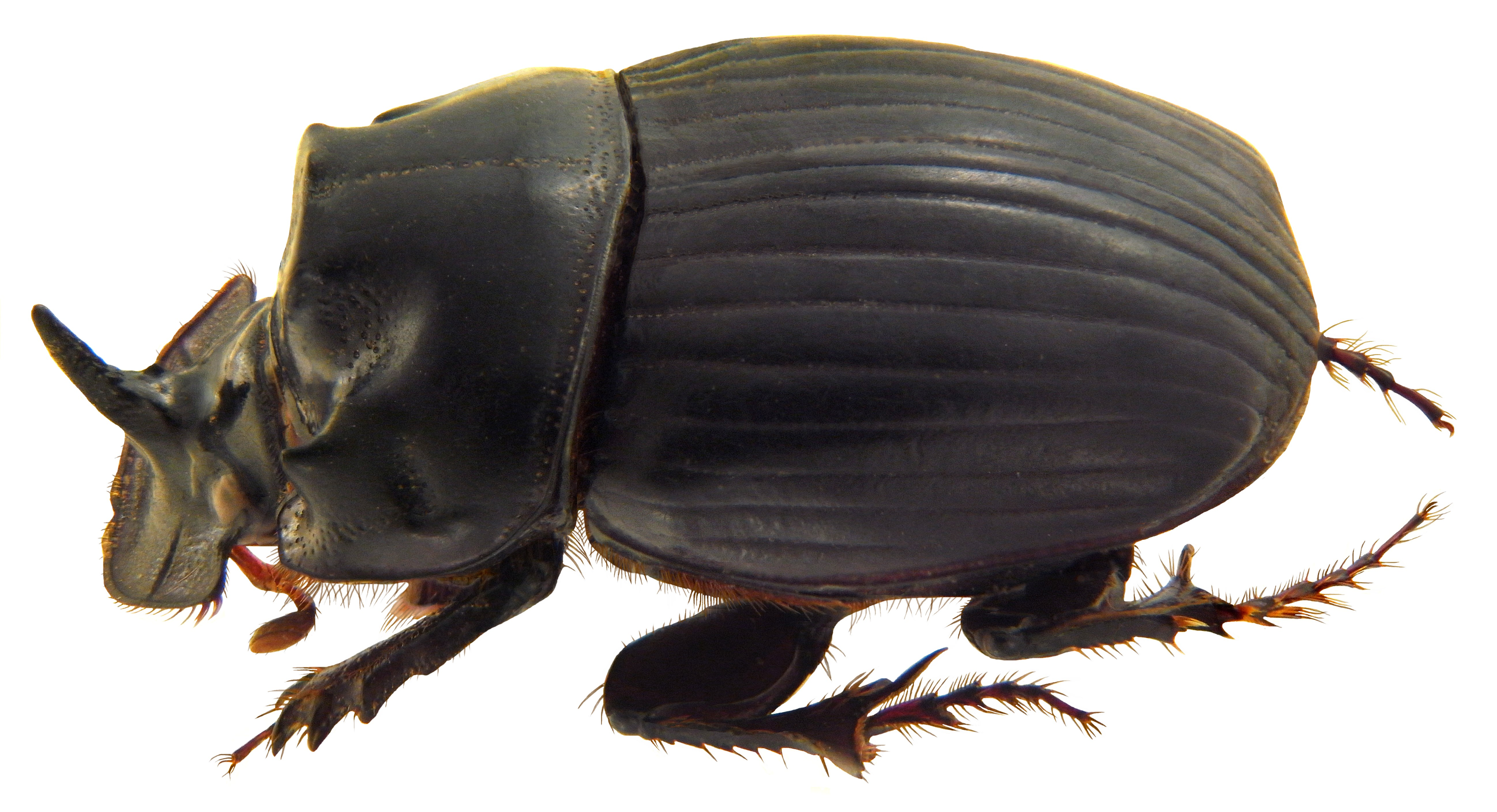
C. magicus Harold, 1881

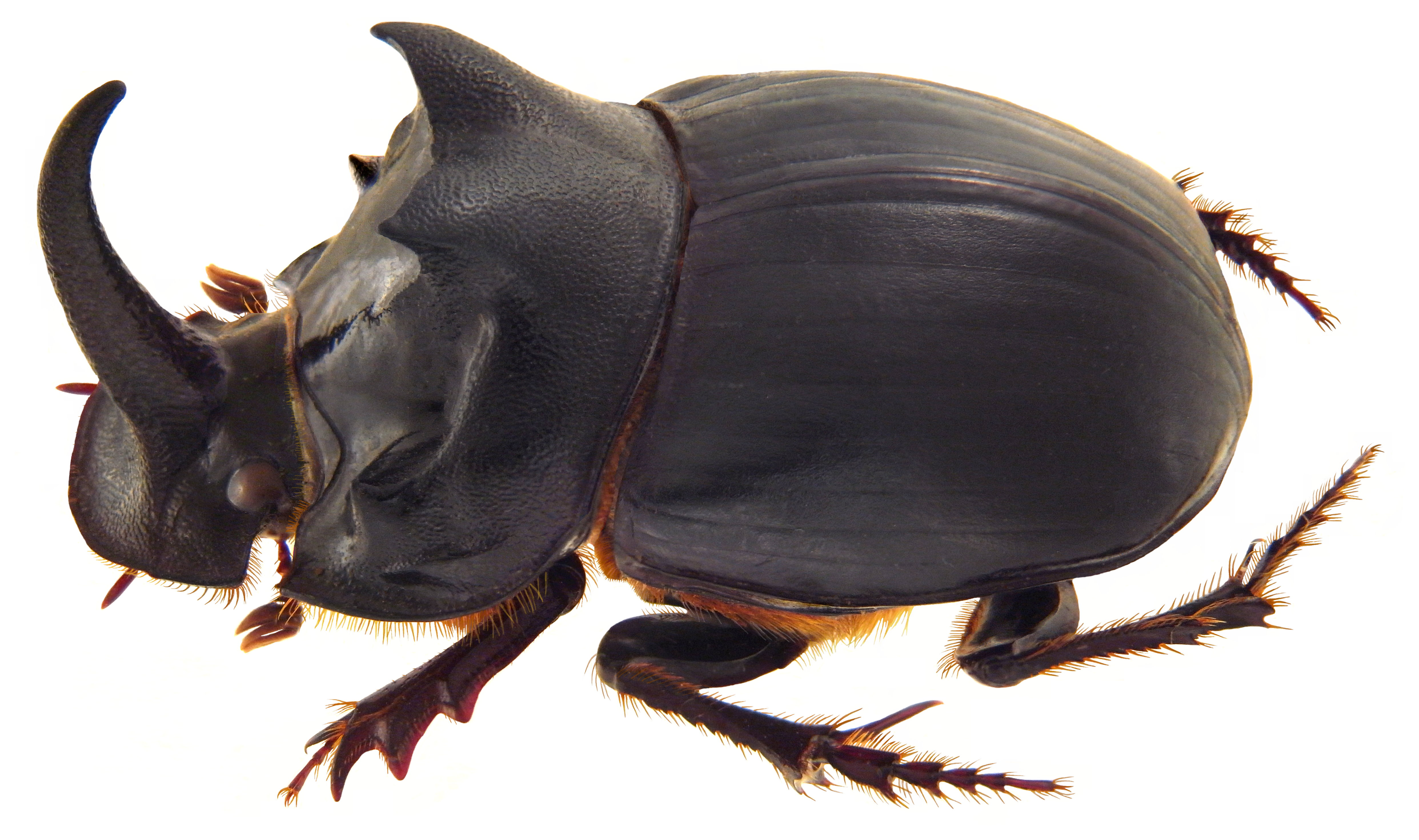
C. ochus Motschulsky, 1860

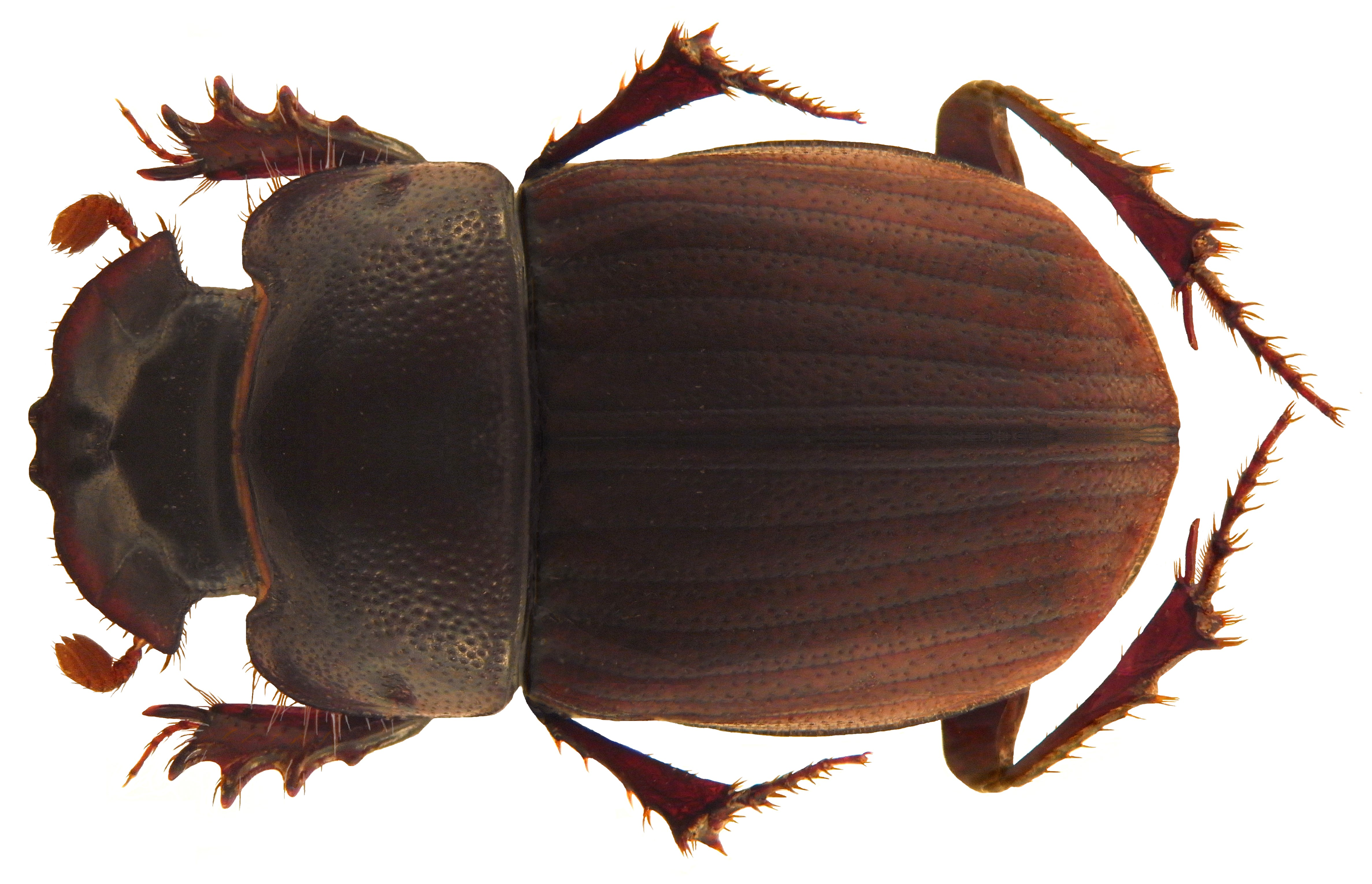
C. punctulatus Wiedemann, 1823

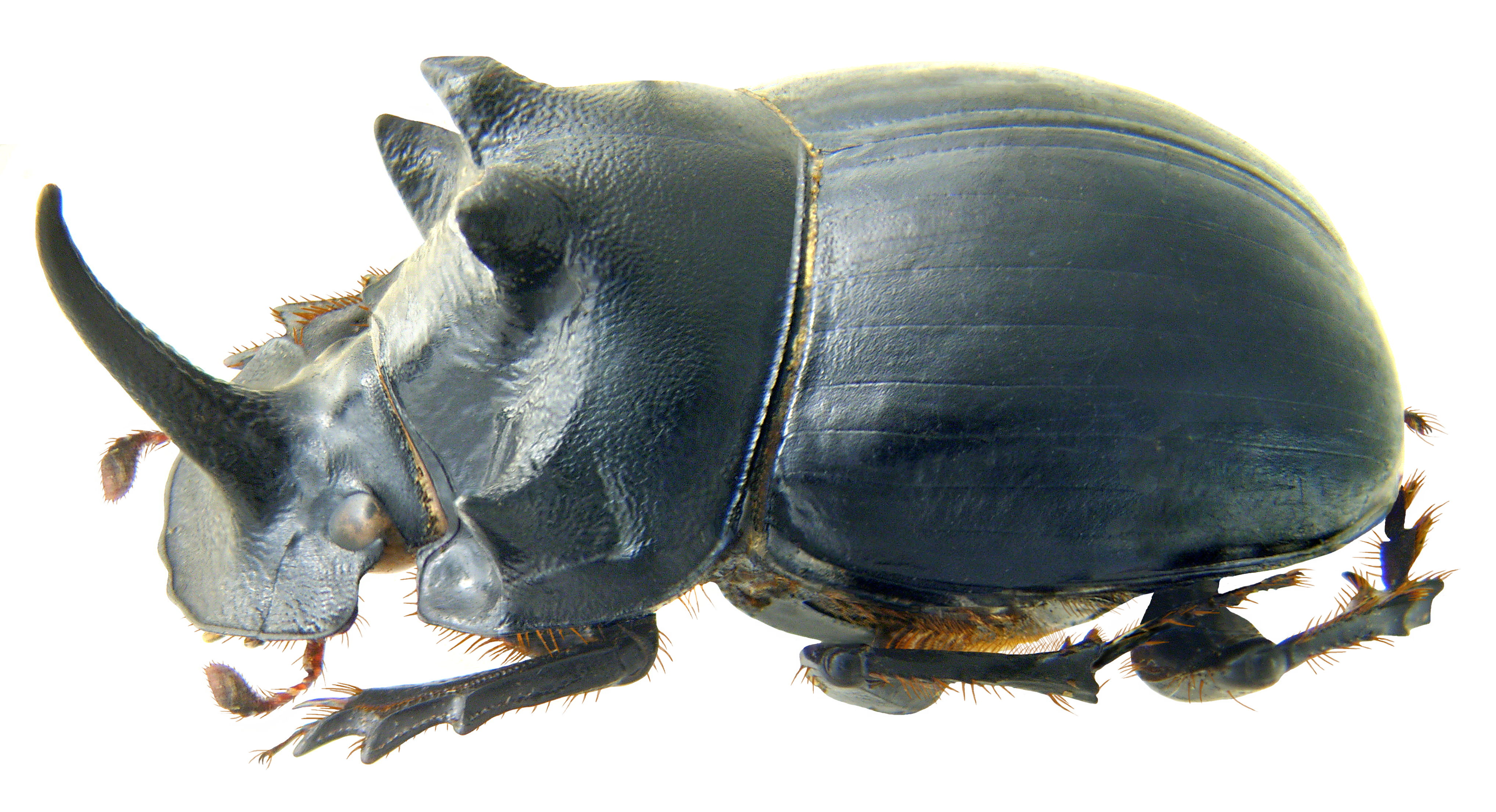
C. sacontala Redtenbacher, 1848

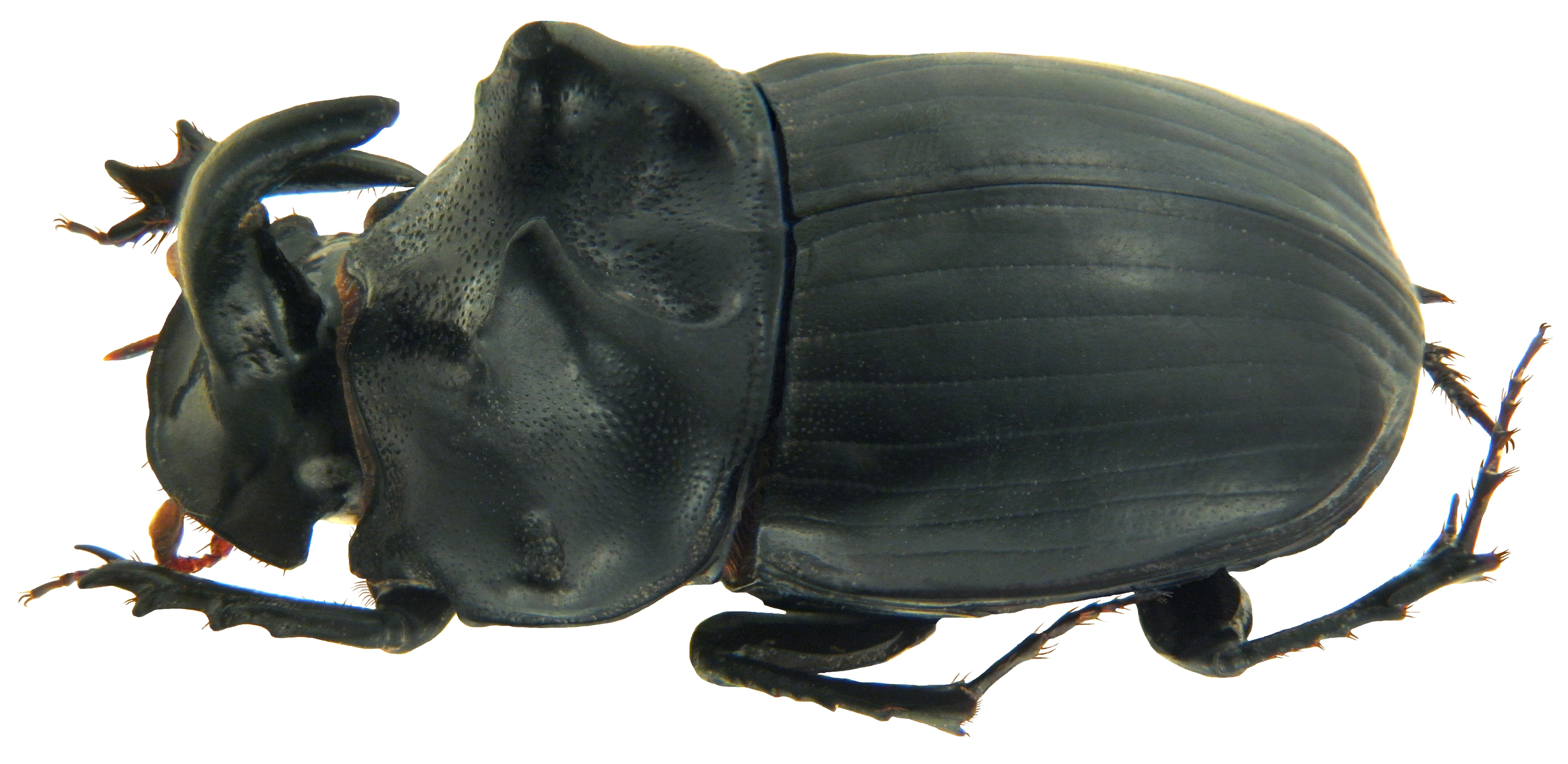
C. siamensis Gillet, 1910
