= 1999 in paleontology =

Paleontology or palaeontology is the study of prehistoric life forms on Earth through the examination of plant and animal fossils. This includes the study of body fossils, tracks (ichnites), burrows, cast-off parts, fossilised feces (coprolites), palynomorphs and chemical residues. Because humans have encountered fossils for millennia, paleontology has a long history both before and after becoming formalized as a science. This article records significant discoveries and events related to paleontology that occurred or were published in the year 1999.

== Flora ==
=== Ferns and fern allies ===
| Name | Novelty | Status | Authors | Age | Type locality | Location | Notes | Images |
|---|---|---|---|---|---|---|---|---|
| Makotopteris | Gen et sp nov | valid | Stockey, Nishida, & Rothwell | Eocene; Ypresian | Eocene Okanagan Highlands; Allenby Formation; Princeton Chert | Canada; British Columbia | An athyriaceous fern The type species is M. princetonensis | |

=== Cycads ===
| Name | Novelty | Status | Authors | Age | Type locality | Location | Notes | Images |
|---|---|---|---|---|---|---|---|---|
| Eostangeria pseudopteris | Sp nov | valid | Kvaček & Manchester | Late Paleocene | upper Fort Union Formation or lower Wasatch Formation | USA; Wyoming | An eostangerioid zamiaceous cycad. Also found in the Eocene John Day Formation of Oregon. | |

=== Angiosperms ===
| Name | Novelty | Status | Authors | Age | Type locality | Location | Notes | Images |
|---|---|---|---|---|---|---|---|---|
| Florissantia sikhote-alinensis | comb nov | valid | (Kryshtofovich) Manchester | Miocene | Amgu flora | Russia; Primorsky Krai | A mallow relative, moved from Porana sikhote-alinensis (1921) | |
| Quercus hiholensis | Sp nov | Valid | Borgardt & Pigg | Middle Miocene | "Yakima Canyon Flora" | USA | A white oak, permineralized acorns | †Quercus hiholensis |
| Sargentodoxa globosa | Comb nov | valid | (Manchester) Manchester | Middle Eocene | Clarno Formation | USA; Oregon | A lardizabalaceous species; New comb for Bumelia? globosa (1994) | |

== Arthropods ==
=== Insects ===
| Name | Novelty | Status | Authors | Age | Unit | Location | Notes | Images |
|---|---|---|---|---|---|---|---|---|
| Cephalotes alveolatus | Comb nov | Valid | (Vierbergen & Scheven) | Burdigalian | Dominican amber | Dominican Republic | A myrmicinae ant, Moved from Zacryptocerus alveolatus (1995) | Cephalotes alveolatus |
| Cephalotes caribicus | Sp nov | Valid | De Andrade & Baroni Urbani | Burdigalian | Dominican amber | Dominican Republic | A myrmicinae ant. | Cephalotes caribicus |
| Cephalotes dieteri | Sp nov | Valid | De Andrade & Baroni Urbani | Burdigalian | Dominican amber | Dominican Republic | A myrmicinae ant. | Cephalotes dieteri |
| Cephalotes hispaniolicus | Sp nov | Valid | De Andrade & Baroni Urbani | Burdigalian | Dominican amber | Dominican Republic | A myrmicinae ant. | Cephalotes hispaniolicus |
| Cephalotes serratus | Comb nov | valid | (Vierbergen & Scheven, 1995) | Burdigalian | Dominican amber | Dominican Republic | A myrmicinae ant, moved from Exocryptocerus serratus (1995) | Cephalotes serratus |
| Camponotus crozei | Sp nov | Valid | Riou | Turolian | Montagne d'Andance | France | A formicine ant. | Camponotus crozei |
| Electrostephanus neovenatus | Sp nov | valid | Aguiar & Janzen | Lutetian | Baltic Amber | Europe | A stephanid wasp | |
| Electrostephanus sulcatus | Sp nov | jr synonym | Aguiar & Janzen | Lutetian | Baltic Amber | Europe | A stephanid wasp, Moved to Denaeostephanus sulcatus | |
| Neoephemera antiqua | sp. nov | valid | Sinitchenkova | Ypresian | Klondike Mountain Formation | USA | A neoephemerid mayfly | Neoephemera antiqua |
| Pachycondyla rebekkae | sp. nov | valid | Rust & Andersen | Ypresian | Fur Formation | Denmark | A Myrmeciinae ant moved to Ypresiomyrma rebekkae (2006) | Pachycondyla rebekkae |
| Penthetria intermedia | Comb nov | valid | (Scudder) | Priabonian | Florissant Formation | United States; Colorado | A bibionid fly Originally Mycetophaetus intermedius (1892); Moved from Plecia intermedia (1959) | |

== Mollusca ==
=== Newly named bivalves ===
| Name | Novelty | Status | Authors | Age | Unit | Location | Notes | Images |
|---|---|---|---|---|---|---|---|---|
| Concavodonta ovalis | sp nov | Valid | Sánchez | Caradoc | Don Braulio Formation | Argentina | third species in the genus | |
| Concavodontinae | subfam nov | Valid | Sánchez | Ordovician | | | one of two Subfamilies in Praenuculidae | |
| Cuyopsis | Gen et sp nov | Valid | Sánchez | Caradoc | Don Braulio Formation | Argentina | Monotypic with the species C. symmetricus | |
| Emiliania | Gen et sp nov | homonym | Sánchez | Caradoc | Don Braulio Formation | Argentina | genus name preoccupied by Emiliania Hay & Mohler, 1967, renamed to Emiliodonta | |
| Hemiconcavodonta | Gen et sp nov | Valid | Sánchez | Caradoc | Don Braulio Formation | Argentina | third genus in the subfamily Concavodontinae | |
| Praenuculinae | subfam nov | Valid | Sánchez | Ordovician | | | one of two Subfamilies in Praenuculidae | |
| Similodonta ceryx | Sp nov | Valid | Cope | Middle Ordovician | Gilfach Farm No. 1 Borehole | Wales | oldest species in the genus Similodonta | |
| Trigonoconcha | Gen et sp nov | Valid | Sánchez | Caradoc | Don Braulio Formation | Argentina | Monotypic with the species T. acuta | |
| Villicumia | Gen et sp nov | Valid | Sánchez | Caradoc | Don Braulio Formation | Argentina | Monotypic with the species V. canteraensis | |

== Fish ==
=== Newly named actinopterygii ("ray-finned fish") ===
| Name | Novelty | Status | Authors | Age | Unit | Location | Notes | Images |
|---|---|---|---|---|---|---|---|---|
| Nardovelifer | gen et sp nov | Valid | C. Sorbini & L. Sorbini | Campanian | Nardo | Italy | | Nardovelifer altipinnis |

== Reptiles ==
=== Archosauromorphs ===
- Ornithomimid gastroliths documented.

==== Newly named dinosauriforms ====
| Name | Novelty | Status | Authors | Age | Unit | Location | Notes | Images |
|---|---|---|---|---|---|---|---|---|
| Eucoelophysis | gen et sp nov | Valid | Sullivan & Lucas | Norian | Chinle Formation, New Mexico | USA | Sister genus to the Dinosaurs; first identified as a relative of coelophysid. | |

==== Newly named dinosaurs ====
Data courtesy of George Olshevsky's dinosaur genera list.

| Name | Novelty | Status | Authors | Age | Unit | Location | Notes | Images |
|---|---|---|---|---|---|---|---|---|
| Achillobator | Gen et sp nov | Valid | Perle, Norell, & Clark | Late Cretaceous | Bayan Shireh Formation | Mongolia | A large dromaeosaurid. | Achillobator |
| Agustinia | Gen et sp nov | Valid | Bonaparte | Albian | Lohan Cura Formation | Argentina | An armored sauropod | Agustinia |
| "Airakoraptor" | gen nov | Nomen nudum | Perle, Norell, & Clark | | | Mongolia | A dromaeosaurid, now Kuru kulla, which was later described in 2021. | |
| Animantarx | Gen et sp nov | Valid | Carpenter, Kirkland, Burge, & Bird | Late Cretaceous | Cedar Mountain Formation, Utah | USA | Nodosaur whose name means "living citadel." | Animantarx ramaljonesi |
| "Archaeoraptor" | | Hoax | Stephen Czerkas vide:C. P. Sloan vide:Olson | | | | Chimera of Yanornis and Microraptor. | |
| Atlasaurus | gen et sp nov | Valid | Monbaron, Russell, & Taquet | Middle Jurassic | Tiougguit Formation | Morocco | A primitive sauropod | |
| Beipiaosaurus | gen et sp nov | Valid | Xu, Tang, & Wang | Early Cretaceous | Yixian Formation | China | A therizinosaur | Beipiaosaurus |
| "Bilbeyhallorum" | | Nomen nudum | Burge, Bird, McClelland, & Cicconetti | Aptian | Cedar Mountain Formation, Utah | USA | informal name for Cedarpelta. | |
| Cedarosaurus | gen et sp nov | Valid | Tidwell, Carpenter, & Brooks | Barremian | Cedar Mountain Formation, Utah | USA | A sauropod. | |
| Chaoyangsaurus | gen et sp nov | Valid | Zhao, Cheng, & Xu | Late Jurassic | Tuchengzi Formation | China | An extremely primitive ceratopsian | Chaoyangsaurus |
| Dinheirosaurus | gen et sp nov | Valid | Bonaparte & Mateus | Kimmeridgian | Alcobaça Formation | Portugal | A diplodocid. | |
| "Eugongbusaurus" | gen nov | Nomen nudum | Knoll | Late Jurassic | Shishugou Formation | China | A ?hypsilophodont that hasn't yet been formally named. | |
| Gondwanatitan | gen et sp nov | Valid | Kellner & Azevedo | Late Cretaceous | Adamantina Formation | Brazil | A titanosaur | |
| Guaibasaurus | gen et sp nov | Valid | Bonaparte, Ferigolo, & Ribeiro | Late Triassic | Caturrita Formation | Brazil | A sauropodomorph. | Guaibasaurus |
| Jobaria | gen et sp nov | Valid | Sereno, et al | Middle Jurassic | Tiourarén Formation | Niger | A eusauropod | Jobaria |
| Lessemsaurus | gen et sp nov | Valid | Bonaparte | Late Triassic | Los Colorados Formation | Argentina | A primitive sauropodomorph | Lessemsaurus sauropoides |
| Lirainosaurus | gen et sp nov | Valid | Sanz et al | Late Cretaceous | Vitoria Formation | Spain | A titanosaur. | |
| Lurdusaurus | gen et sp nov | Valid | Taquet & Russell | Aptian | Elrhaz Formation | Niger | A hadrosaur | Lurdusaurus |
| "Newtonsaurus" | gen et sp nov | Nomen nudum | Welles vide: Welles & Pickering | Late Triassic | Rhaetic beds | Wales | Informal name. Formally describe in 2025. | "Newtonsaurus" |
| Nigersaurus | gen et sp nov | Valid | Sereno et al | Early Cretaceous | Elrhaz Formation | Niger | A rebbachisaurid | Nigersaurus |
| Nodocephalosaurus | gen et sp nov | Valid taxon | Sullivan | Campanian | Kirtland Formation | USA | An ankylosaurid | |
| Proyandusaurus | gen nov | synonym | Knoll | Bajocian | Shaximiao Formation | China | informal name for Hexinlusaurus | |
| Qantassaurus | gen et sp nov | Valid | Rich & Vickers-Rich | Early Cretaceous | Wonthaggi Formation | Australia | A possible hypsilophodontid | Qantassaurus intrepidus |
| Santanaraptor | gen et sp nov | Valid | Kellner | Cenomanian | Santana Formation | Brazil | A theropod | Santanaraptor placidus |
| Saturnalia | gen et sp nov | Valid | Langer, Abdala, Richter, & Benton | Carnian | Santa Maria Formation | Brazil Zimbabwe | A basal sauropodomorph | Saturnalia |
| Sinornithosaurus | gen et sp nov | Valid | Xu, Wang, & Wu | Aptian | Yixian Formation | China | A Dromaeosaurid | Sinornithosaurus |
| Tangvayosaurus | Gen et sp nov | Valid | Allain et at | Early Cretaceous | Grès Supérior Formation | Laos | A titanosaur | |
| Tehuelchesaurus | Gen et sp nov | Valid | Rich et al | Middle Jurassic | Cañadon Asfalto Formation | Argentina | A eusauropod | |

==== Newly named birds ====
| Name | Novelty | Status | Authors | Age | Unit | Location | Notes | Images |
|---|---|---|---|---|---|---|---|---|
| Amplibuteo concordatus | Sp. nov. | Valid | Steven D. Emslie Nicholas J. Czaplewski | Late Pliocene | Florida and Arizona | USA: Florida; Arizona | An Accipitridae. | |
| Anatalavis oxfordi | Sp. nov. | Valid | Storrs L. Olson | Early Eocene | Ypresian, London Clay, MP 8 | UK: England | An Anseranatidae, Anatalavinae Olson, 1999. In 2002 Jíří Mlíkovský made this species the type species of his not widely accepted new genus Nettapterornis. | |
| Aquila bivia | Sp. nov. | Valid | Steven D. Emslie Nicholas J. Czaplewski | Late Pliocene | Florida | USA: Florida; Arizona | An Accipitridae. | |
| Argornis caucasicus | Gen. nov. et Sp. nov. | Valid | Aleksandr A. Karkhu | Late Eocene | Northern Caucasus | Russia | An Apodiformes, Jungornithidae Karkhu, 1988. | |
| Canadaga arctica | Gen. nov. et Sp. nov. | Valid | Hou Lianhai | Late Cretaceous | Middle Maastrichtian | Canada: Nunavut | A Hesperornithidae Marsh, 1872. | |
| Changchengornis hengdaoziensis | Gen. nov. et Sp. nov. | Valid | Ji Qiang Luis M. Chiappe Ji Shu’an | Early Cretaceous | Chaomidianzi Formation | China | A Confuciusornithidae Hou, Zhou, Gu et Zhang, 1995. | |
| Chaunoides antiquus | Sp. nov. | Valid | Herculano M. F. de Alvarenga | Late Oligocene or Early Miocene | Tremembé Formation | Brazil | An Anhimidae. | |
| Chauvireria bulgarica | Sp. nov. | Valid | Boev | Pleistocene | | Bulgaria | A Phasianidae. | |
| Confuciusornis dui | Sp. nov. | Valid | Hou Lianhai Larry D. Martin Zhou Zhonghe Alan Feduccia Zhang Fucheng | Early Cretaceous | Yixian Formation | China | A Confuciusornithidae Hou, Zhou, Gu et Zhang, 1995. | |
| Dryolimnas augusti | Sp. nov. | Valid | Cécile Mourer-Chauviré Roger Bour Sonia Ribes François Moutou | Holocene | Réunion | Réunion | A Rallidae. | |
| Emberiza alcoveri | Sp. nov. | Valid | J. C. Rando M. Lopez B. Seguí | Late Pleistocene-Holocene | Canary Islands, Tenerife | Spain: Canary Islands | An Emberizidae. | |
| Eocuculus cherpinae | Gen. nov. et Sp. nov. | Valid | Robert M. Chandler | Late Eocene | Early Chadronian | USA: Colorado | A ?Cuculidae. | |
| Eoenantiornis buhleri | Gen. nov. et Sp. nov. | Valid | Hou Lianhai Larry D. Martin Zhou Zongzhe Alan Feduccia | Early Cretaceous | Yixian Formation | China | An Enantiornithes Walker, 1981, Eoenantiornithiformes Hou, Martin, Zhou et Feduccia, 1999, Eoenantiornithidae Hou, Martin, Zhou et Feduccia, 1999, this is the type species of the new genus. | |
| Falco bakalovi | Sp. nov. | Valid | Zlatozar N. Boev | Late Pliocene | Villafranchian, MN 17 | Bulgaria | A Falconidae. | |
| Gallinula balcanica | Sp. nov. | Valid | Zlatozar N. Boev | Late Pliocene | Villafranchian, MN 17 | Bulgaria | A Rallidae. | |
| Graculavus augustus | Sp. nov. | Valid | Sylvia Hope | Late Cretaceous | Late Maastrichtian, Lance Formation | USA: Wyoming | A Graculavidae Fürbringer, 1888. | |
| Gurilynia nessovi | Gen. nov. et Sp. nov. | Valid | Evgeny N. Kurochkin | Late Cretaceous | Gurilyn Tsav | Mongolia | An Enantiornithes Walker, 1981, Alexornithiformes Brodkorb, 1976, Enantiornithidae Nessov & Borkin, 1983. | |
| Hebeiornis fengningensis | Gen. nov. et Sp. nov. | Valid | Yan | Early Cretaceous | Yixian Formation | China | Ornithothoraces Chiappe et Calvo, 1994, this is the type species of the new genus. Vescornis hebeiensis Zhang, Ericson et Zhou, 2004. is a junior synonym. | |
| Liaoxiornis delicatus | Gen. nov. et Sp. nov. | Valid | Hou Lianhai Chen Peiji | Early Cretaceous | Yixian Formation | China | A Liaoxiornithidae L. H. Hou et Chen, 1999, this is the type species of the new genus. Lingyuanornis parvus Ji & Ji, 1999. is a junior synonym. | |
| Longmornis robustirostrata | Gen, nov. et Sp. nov. | Valid | Walter E. Boles | ?Early Miocene | Riversleigh | Australia: Queensland | An Oriolidae, this is the type species of the new genus. | |
| Loxia patevi | Sp. nov. | Valid | Zlatozar N. Boev | Late Pliocene | MN 17 | Bulgaria | A Fringillidae. | |
| Masillapodargus longipes | Gen. nov. et Sp. nov. | Valid | Gerald Mayr | Middle Eocene | Messel pit, MP 11 | Germany: Hessen | A stem Podargidae, this is the type species of the new genus. | |
| Ngawupodius minya | Gen. nov. et Sp. nov. | Valid | Walter E. Boles Tessa J. Ivison | Late Oligocene | Namba Formation | Australia: South Australia | A stem Megapodiidae, this is the type species of the new genus. | |
| Nupharanassa bohemica | Sp. nov. | Valid ? | Jirí Mlíkovský | Early Miocene | MN 4b | Czech Republic | A Jacanidae. Mourer-Chauviré, 1999 transferred this species to the genus Geranopterus Milne-Edwards, 1892 and later it was placed in the Geranopteridae Mayr & Mourer-Chauviré, 2000. | |
| Paraprefica kelleri | Gen. nov. et Sp. nov. | Valid | Gerald Mayr | Middle Eocene | Messel pit, MP 11 | Germany: Hessen | A stem Nyctibiidae, this is the type species of the new genus. | |
| Paraprefica major | Sp. nov. | Valid | Gerald Mayr | Middle Eocene | Messel pit, MP 11 | Germany: Hessen | A stem Nyctibiidae. | |
| Pelecanus schreiberi | Sp. nov. | Valid | Strorrs L. Olson | Early Pliocene | Yorktown Formation | USA: North Carolina | A Pelecanidae. | |
| Primotrogon wintersteini | Gen. nov. et Sp. nov. | Valid | Gerald Mayr | Middle Oligocene | MP 23 | France | A stem Trogonidae, the type species of the new genus. | |
| Pumiliornis tessellatus | Gen. nov. et Sp. nov. | Valid | Gerald Mayr | Middle Eocene | Messel pit, MP 11 | Germany: Hessen | Order and family Incerta Sedis, the type species of the new genus. | |
| Regulus bulgaricus | Sp. nov. | Valid | Zlatozar N. Boev | Late Pliocene | MN 17 | Bulgaria | A Regulidae. | |
| Scolopax carmesinae | Sp. nov. | Valid | Bartomeu Seguí | Late Pliocene | Menorca, MN 17-18 | Spain: Menorca | A Scolopacidae. | |
| Selmes absurdipes | Gen. nov. et Sp. nov. | Valid | Dieter S. Peters | Middle Eocene | Messel pit, MP 11; MP 13 | Germany: Hessen; Saxony-Anhalt | A Coliiformes, Selmeidae Zelenkov et Dyke, 2008, the type species of the new genus. | |
| Tyto neddi | Sp. nov. | Valid | David W. Steadman William B. Hilgartner | Late Pleistocene-Early Holocene | Barbuda | Antigua and Barbuda | A Tytonidae. | |
| Yandangornis longicaudus | Gen. nov. et Sp. nov. | Valid | Cai Zhengquan Zhao Lijun | Early Late Cretaceous | Santonian | China | An Enentiornithes, this is the type species of the new genus. | |

==== Newly named pterosaurs ====
| Name | Novelty | Status | Authors | Age | Unit | Location | Notes | Images |
|---|---|---|---|---|---|---|---|---|
| Dendrorhynchoides | gen nov | Valid | Ji S.-A., Ji Q., & Padian | Aptian | Yixian Formation | China | A new genus for "Dendrorhynchus" curvidentatus (Ji & Ji, 1998) | |
| Siroccopteryx | gen et sp nov | junior synonym? | Mader & Kellner | Cenomanian | Kem Kem Formation | Morocco | possibly a jr synonym of Coloborhynchus? | |
| Tendaguripterus | gen et sp nov | Valid | Unwin & Heinrich | Kimmeridgian | Tendaguru Formation | Tanzania | Monotypic with the species T. recki | |

=== Lepidosauromorphs ===
==== Newly named plesiosaurs ====
| Name | Novelty | Status | Authors | Age | Unit | Location | Notes | Images |
|---|---|---|---|---|---|---|---|---|
| Callawayasaurus | gen nov | Valid | Carpenter | Aptian | Paja Formation | Colombia | New genus for the species "Alzadasaurus" colombiensis Wells, 1962 | |

==== Newly named scincomorphans ====
| Name | Novelty | Status | Authors | Age | Unit | Location | Notes | Images |
|---|---|---|---|---|---|---|---|---|
| Pachygenys | gen nov | Valid | Gao and Cheng | Early Cretaceous | Eastern China | China | Has a distinctly small amount of dentary teeth. | |

== Other Animals ==
| Name | Status | Authors | Age | Unit | Location | Notes | Images |
|---|---|---|---|---|---|---|---|
| Charniodiscus yorgensis | Disputed | Borchvardt et Nessov | Ediacaran | Zimnie Gory Formation and Ust-Pinega Formation | Russia | | |
