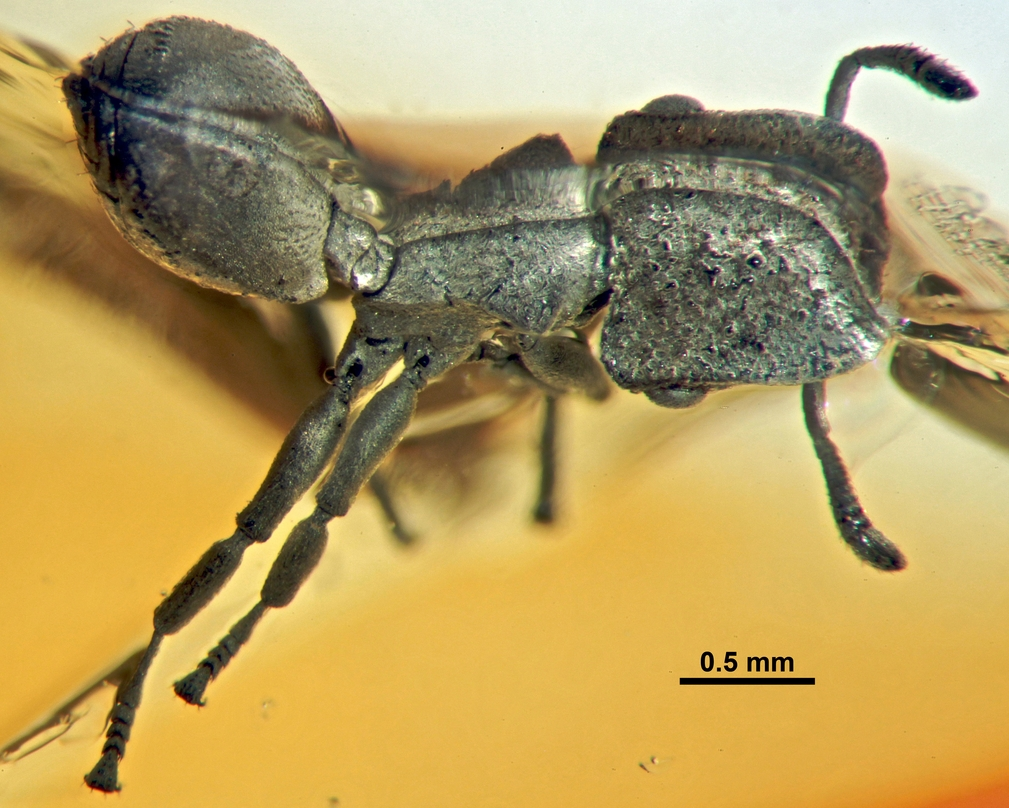
- Paratype worker

Scientific classification
- Domain: Eukaryota
- Kingdom: Animalia
- Phylum: Arthropoda
- Class: Insecta
- Order: Hymenoptera
- Family: Formicidae
- Subfamily: Myrmicinae
- Genus: Cephalotes
- Species: †C. dieteri

Binomial name
- †Cephalotes dieteri De Andrade & Baroni Urbani, 1999

= Cephalotes dieteri =

Cephalotes dieteri Temporal range: Burdigalian

Extinct species of ant

Cephalotes dieteri is an extinct species of ant in the subfamily Myrmicinae known from two Middle Miocene fossils found in amber on Hispaniola. At the time of description, C. dieteri was one of seven fossil ant species placed in the Cephalotes coffeae clade.

== History and classification ==
Cephalotes dieteri was described from two fossil ants which are preserved as inclusions in transparent chunks of Dominican amber. The amber was produced by the extinct Hymenaea protera, which formerly grew on Hispaniola, across northern South America and up to southern Mexico. The specimens were collected from unidentified amber mines in the Dominican Republic. The amber dates from the Burdigalian stage of the Miocene, being recovered from sections of the La Toca Formation in the Cordillera Septentrional and the Yanigua Formation in the Cordillera Oriental.

At the time of description, the holotype and paratype specimens were both preserved in the collections of the State Museum of Natural History Stuttgart in Germany. Living and fossil Cephalotes, Eucryptocerus, Exocryptocerus and Zacryptocerus ants were examined in 1999 by Maria L. De Andrade and Cesare Baroni Urbani with a redescription of included species being published in the journal Stuttgarter Beiträge zur Naturkunde. Serie B (Geologie und Paläontologie). The two fossils were first described in the paper along with a number of fossils and were placed into the new species Cephalotes dieteri. De Andrade and Baroni Urbani coined the specific epithet dieteri as a patronym honoring Dieter Schlee, who was responsible for amassing the Stuttgart amber collections that housed many of the specimens studied.

=== Phylogeny ===
In the study of Cephalotes by de Andrade and Baroni Urbani C. dieteri was grouped into the coffeae clade consisting of seven extinct species and four extant species. The clade shares two, possibly three distinct features between the species. Segment three of the abdomen is modified into a post petiole which in turn is modified to have large side wings. Additionally the first sternite of the gaster has a simple reticulated surface sculpturing.

- Cephalotes
  - C. crenaticeps clade
  - C. coffeae clade
    - †C. alveolatus
    - - †C. ventriosus
      - †C. obscurus
      - - †C. integerrimus
        - †C. dieteri
        - - †C. bloosi
          - - C. setulifer
            - - C. peruviensis
              - - C. coffeae
                - C. trichophorus
  - - - C. wheeleri clade
      - C. texanus clade
    - - C. bimaculatus clade

== Description ==
Workers of C. dieteri range in length between 3.22–3.48 mm (0.127–0.137 in), and a head length of 0.80–0.88 mm (0.031–0.035 in). The frontal ridges on the face, rear corners of the head along with the borders of the pronotal and gastral wings are a lighter coloration than the rest of the workers bodies. The exoskeleton is covered with varying sized reticulation, and hairs of several types are present. There are two long thin hairs present on the second tergite of the gaster, while the rear borders of the hind gasteral tergites have rare club-tipped hairs. The head is shorter than wide, with truncated rear corners and a concave rear edge. The face has two raised ridges that have crenulated margins, and the rear corners are also crenulated. The pronotum with a narrow, long, continuous suture, while the mesonotum and the petiole are both unarmed, lacking the larger spines seen on other species. The denser reticulation of the exoskeleton, along with the slightly smaller head size separates C. dieteri from its sister species Cephalotes integerrimus, also from Dominican amber.
