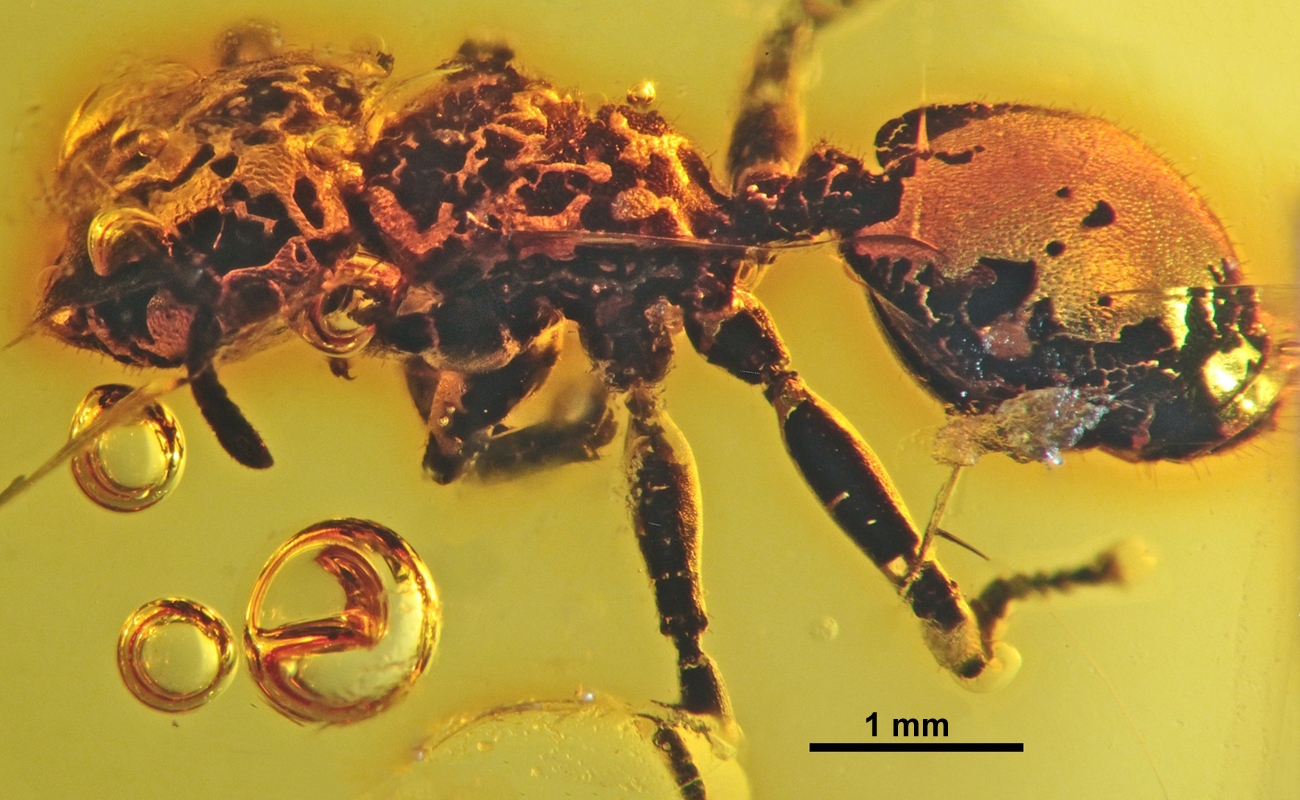
- Holotype

Scientific classification
- Kingdom: Animalia
- Phylum: Arthropoda
- Clade: Pancrustacea
- Class: Insecta
- Order: Hymenoptera
- Family: Formicidae
- Subfamily: Myrmicinae
- Genus: Cephalotes
- Species: †C. alveolatus

Binomial name
- †Cephalotes alveolatus (Vierbergen & Scheven, 1995)

Synonyms
- Zacryptocerus alveolatus

= Cephalotes alveolatus =

Cephalotes alveolatus Temporal range: Burdigalian

Extinct species of ant

Cephalotes alveolatus is an extinct species of ant in the subfamily Myrmicinae known from a single Middle Miocene fossil found in amber on Hispaniola. At the time of description C. alveolatus was one of seven fossil ant species placed in the Cephalotes coffeae clade.

== History and classification ==
Cephalotes alveolatus was described from a single fossil ant preserved as an inclusion in a transparent chunk of Dominican amber. The amber was produced by the extinct Hymenaea protera, which grew on Hispaniola, across northern South America and up to southern Mexico. The specimen was collected from an unidentified amber mine in the Dominican Republic. The amber dates from the Burdigalian stage of the Miocene being recovered from sections of the La Toca Formation in the Cordillera Septentrional and the Yanigua Formation in the Cordillera Oriental.

At the time of description, the holotype specimen was preserved in the private collection of Joachim Scheven in Hagen, Germany. The fossil was first studied by researchers Gijsbertus Vierbergen and Joachim Scheven with their 1995 type description of the new species being published in the Creation Research Society quarterly. They placed the species into the genus Zacryptocerus, and coined the specific epithet alveolatus as a reference to the many small pits on the head and body of the worker.

Living and fossil species of the genera Cephalotes, Eucryptocerus, Exocryptocerus and Zacryptocerus were examined in 1999 by Maria L. De Andrade and Cesare Baroni Urbani with a redescription of the Cephalotes being published in the journal Stuttgarter Beiträge zur Naturkunde. Serie B (Geologie und Paläontologie). De Andrade and Baroni Urbani concluded that Cephalotes was paraphyletic if the species placed in the other three genera were not included within the genus. As a result, Zacryptocerus alveolatus was moved to Cephalotes as C. alveolatus. The authors examined the type specimen, then still in Scheven collection, and an additional fossil worker housed in the Staatliches Museum fiir Naturkunde and placed into the species. They noted that the holotype specimen is damaged due to burning, and as such the original coloration of the worker is unidentifiable, and the integument is partially fragmented.

=== Phylogeny ===
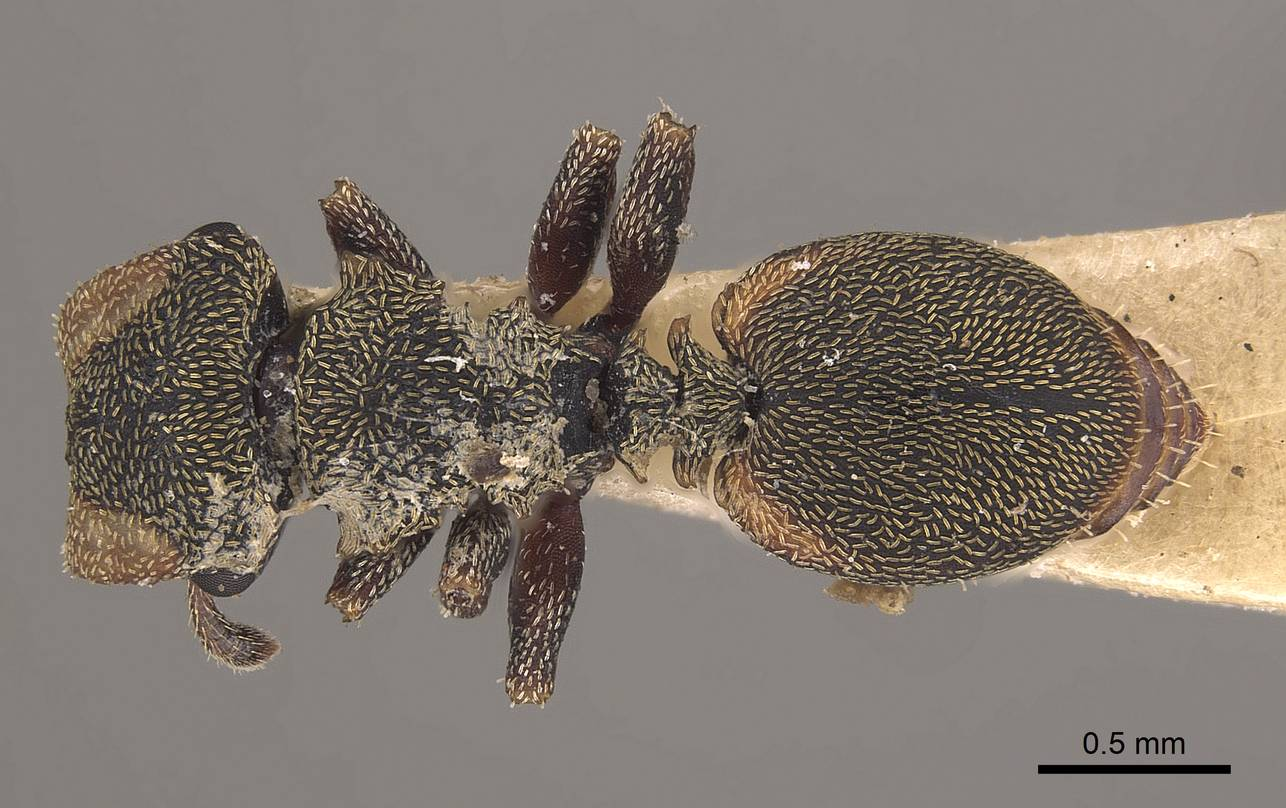
Cephalotes coffeae, type species for the clade

In the study of Cephalotes by de Andrade and Baroni Urbani C. alveolatus was grouped into the coffeae clade consisting of seven extinct species and four extant species. The clade shares two, possibly three distinct features between the species. Segment three of the abdomen is modified into a post petiole which in turn is modified to have large side wings. Additionally the first sternite of the gaster has a simple reticulated surface sculpturing. C. alveolatus was consistently placed as the outgroup species to the other members of the clade in de Andrade and Baroni Urbani's phylogenies, with it sharing several features with other clade species but having large amounts of distinct clubbed hairs.

- Cephalotes
  - C.crenaticeps clade
  - C.coffeae clade
    - †C. alveolatus
    - - †C. ventriosus
      - †C. obscurus
      - - †C. integerrimus
        - †C. dieteri
        - - †C. bloosi
          - - C. setulifer
            - - C. peruviensis
              - - C. coffeae
                - C. trichophorus
  - - - C.wheeleri clade
      - C.texanus clade
    - - C.bimaculatus clade

== Description ==
The two workers known have body lengths between 5.56–6.32 mm (0.219–0.249 in), and heads that range between 1.32–1.46 mm (0.052–0.057 in). The coloration seen on specimen DO-I 980 indicates black tones on the ridges and rear corners of the head along with the lamellae edges which border the pronotum. The front edges of the lamellae on the gaster are rust colored and semi-transparent. The head is almost square in outline, with broadly curved rear corners and a concave rear margin sporting two denticles. Raised ridges on the front area of the head run above the eyes and have a scalloped edge. There are a pair of round to obtuse shaped teeth flanking the sides of the mesonotum, and the propodium edges are marked with small teeth or angles. Similarly, the sides of the petiole have a pair of teeth, while the postpetiole has larger side teeth near its front that angle forward. The upper surface of the postpetiole has a groove along its middle, flanked by two raised ridges. Four different types of hairs are present on the workers. On the gaster sternites sparse long pointed hairs, and long clubbed hairs are present. Similar to the long clubbed hairs are short clubbed hairs present in dense amounts on the gaster, legs and postpetiole segment, and in sparser amounts on the mesosoma sides, corners of the head and on the crenulations of the facial ridges. Lastly there are recumbent hairs on the first segment of the gaster, not originating from exoskeleton depressions, and originating from depressions across the rest of the body.
