= 1995 in paleontology =

Paleontology or palaeontology is the study of prehistoric life forms on Earth through the examination of plant and animal fossils. This includes the study of body fossils, tracks (ichnites), burrows, cast-off parts, fossilised feces (coprolites), palynomorphs and chemical residues. Because humans have encountered fossils for millennia, paleontology has a long history both before and after becoming formalized as a science. This article records significant discoveries and events related to paleontology that occurred or were published in the year 1995.

== Plants ==
=== Conifers ===
==== Conifer research ====
- Phipps, Osborne, & Stockey detail permineralized Pinus pollen cones from the Allenby Formations Princeton Chert site. The description is the first to include in-situ pollen ultrastructure and the cones are the oldest Pinus pollen cones that had been described to date. Affiliation with the Princeton chert organ taxa Pinus similkameenensis (leaves) and Pinus arnoldii (seed cones) was suggested.

== Arthropods ==
=== Newly named arachnids ===
Name	Novelty	Status	Authors	Age	Type locality	Country	Notes	Images
Uintascorpio	gen et sp nov	valid	Perry	Middle Eocene	Green River Formation	USA	only scorpion from the Green River Formation	

=== Newly named insects ===
Name	Novelty	Status	Authors	Age	Type locality	Country	Notes	Images
Aphaenogaster amphioceanica	Sp nov	Valid	De Andrade	Burdigalian	Dominican amber	Dominican Republic	A myrmicine ant	Aphaenogaster amphioceanica
Aphaenogaster praerelicta	Sp nov	Valid	De Andrade	Burdigalian	Mexican amber	Mexico	A myrmicine ant	
Baltimartyria	gen et comb nov	valid	Skalski	Early Eocene	Baltic amber		A micropterigid moth moved from Micropterix proavitella (1936)	
Dryinus grimaldii	sp nov	valid	Olmi	Burdigalian	Dominican amber	Dominican Republic	A Dryinus lamellatus group wasp	Dryinus grimaldii
Electrinocellia	subfam, gen et sp nov	Valid	Engel	Eocene	Baltic amber		sister taxon to the rest of Inocelliidae	
Exocryptocerus jansei	sp nov	Jr synonym	Vierbergen & Scheven	Burdigalian	Dominican amber	Dominican Republic	A myrmicinae ant, moved to Cephalotes jansei (1999)	Cephalotes jansei
Exocryptocerus elevatus	sp nov	Jr synonym	Vierbergen & Scheven	Burdigalian	Dominican amber	Dominican Republic	A myrmicinae ant, jr synonym of Cephalotes serratus (1999)	
Exocryptocerus serratus	sp nov	Jr synonym	Vierbergen & Scheven	Burdigalian	Dominican amber	Dominican Republic	A myrmicinae ant, moved to Cephalotes serratus (1999)	Cephalotes serratus
Exocryptocerus truncatus	sp nov	Jr synonym	Vierbergen & Scheven	Burdigalian	Dominican amber	Dominican Republic	A myrmicinae ant, jr synonym of Cephalotes serratus (1999)	Cephalotes serratus
Zacryptocerus alveolatus	sp nov	Jr synonym	Vierbergen & Scheven	Burdigalian	Dominican amber	Dominican Republic	A myrmicinae ant, moved to Cephalotes alveolatus (1999)	Zacryptocerus alveolatus

== Brachiopods ==
Name	Novelty	Status	Authors	Age	Type locality	Country	Notes	Images
Boucotia argentina	Sp nov	Valid	Herrera	Lochkovian	Talacasto Formation	Argentina	A species of Boucotia	

== Molluscs ==
=== Bivalves ===
Name	Novelty	Status	Authors	Age	Type locality	Country	Notes	Images
Camya	gen et sp nov	valid	Hinz-Schallreuter	Early Cambrian	Bornholm	Denmark	The type species is C. asy	
Pojetaia ostseensis	sp nov	nomen dubium	Hinz-Schallreuter	Early Cambrian	Bornholm	Denmark	Probable synonym of P. runnegari	

== Fish ==
=== Newly named bony fish ===
Name	Novelty	Status	Authors	Age	Type locality	Country	Notes	Images
Asiamericana	Gen. et sp. nov	dubious	Nesov	Turonian	Bissekty Formation	Uzbekistan	A possible ichthyodectid. Originally described as possible spinosaurid teeth.	

== Archosauromorphs ==
=== Newly named dinosaurs ===
- Fossil hunters working on behalf of the Royal Saskatchewan Museum discover a large coprolite from a theropod dinosaur in Maastrichtian strata. In 1997 it is sent to coprolite specialist Karen Chin, who determines that this specimen of fossilized feces was attributable to Tyrannosaurus rex. One year later, in 1998, Karen Chin and others publish a joint paper in Nature announcing the finding.
- Paul Sereno lead an expedition to the Kem Kem region of southeastern Morocco. Among the fossils discovered is a partial skull of Carcharodontosaurus saharicus. Significantly, it preserves a "complete and undistorted braincase" which would later be described in detail along with the structure of the inner ear of C. saharicus by Hans C. E. Larsson in 2001.

Data courtesy of George Olshevsky's dinosaur genera list.

Name	Novelty	Status	Authors	Age	Type locality	Country	Notes	Images
Achelousaurus	Gen et sp nov	Valid	Sampson	Campanian	Two Medicine Formation	USA (Montana)	A centrosaurin ceratopsian	Achelousaurus
Ampelosaurus	Gen et sp nov	Valid	Le Loeuff	Maastrichtian	Marnes Rouges Inferieures Formation	France	A French titanosaur	Ampelosaurus
"Brontoraptor"		nomen nudum	Redman					
Bugenasaura	Gen et sp nov	Junior synonym of Thescelosaurus	Galton	Lancian	Hell Creek	USA		
Chindesaurus	Gen et sp nov	Valid	Long & Murry			USA (Arizona, New Mexico and Texas)	A herrerasaurid	Chindesaurus
"Dinotyrannus"	Gen et sp nov	Junior synonym of Tyrannosaurus	Olshevsky, Ford & Yamamoto	Lancian				
Einiosaurus	Gen et sp nov	Valid	Sampson	Campanian	Two Medicine Formation	USA (Montana)	A centrosaurin ceratopsian	Einiosaurus
Genusaurus	Gen et sp nov	Valid	Accarie et al.			France		
Giganotosaurus	Gen et sp nov	Valid	Coria & Salgado			Argentina	A carcharodontosaurid	Giganotosaurus
Jainosaurus		Valid	Hunt, Lockley, Lucas, & Meyer			India		
"Jenghizkhan"		Junior Synonym	Olshevsky, Ford & Yamamoto				Junior synonym of Tarbosaurus	Tarbosaurus.
Jingshanosaurus		Valid	Zhang & Yang			China		"Jingshanosaurus"
Kulceratops		Valid	Nesov					
"Liassaurus"		nomen nudum	Welles, Powell, & Pickering					
"Merosaurus"		nomen nudum	Welles, Powell, & Pickering					
Niobrarasaurus		Valid	Carpenter, Dilkes, & Weishampel	Coniacian-Santonian	Niobrara Formation	United States (Kansas)	A nodosaurid	
Saurophaganax		Valid	Chure	Kimmeridgian-Tithonian	Morrison Formation	United States (Oklahoma)	An allosaurid	
Stygivenator	Gen nov	junior synonym or Valid	Olshevsky, Ford & Yamamoto	Lancian	Hell Creek Formation		Junior synonym of Tyrannosaurus	
Texasetes	Gen et sp nov	Valid	Coombs	late Albian-early Cenomanian	Paw Paw Formation	United States (Texas)	A nodosaurid	
"Walkersaurus"		nomen nudum	Welles, Powell & Pickering vide: Pickering	Bajocian			Material later named Duriavenator	

=== Newly named birds ===
Name	Status	Novelty	Authors	Age	Type locality	Country	Notes	Images
Ajaia chione	Sp. nov.	Valid	Steven D. Emslie	Pleistocene	Early Irvingtonian, Bermont Formation	USA: Florida	A threskiornithid.	
Ameripodius silvasantosi	Gen. et sp. nov.	Valid	Herculano M. F. de Alvarenga	Late Oligocene-Early Miocene	Tremembé Formation	Brazil	A quercymegapodiid craciform	
Anhinga malagurala	Sp. nov.	Valid	Brian Mackness	Early Pliocene	Allingham Formation	Australia: Queensland	An anhingid	
Avisaurus gloriae	Sp. nov.	Valid	David J. Varricchio Luis M. Chiappe	Late Cretaceous	Maastrichtian, Hell Creek Formation	USA: Montana	An avisaurid enantiornithean	
Boluochia zhengi	Gen. et sp. nov.	Valid	Zhou Zhonghe	Early Cretaceous	Valanginian, Jiufotang Formation	China	A longipterygid enantiornithean	
Confuciusornis sanctus	Gen. et sp. nov.	Valid	Hou Lianhai Zhou Zhonghe Gu Yucai Zhang He	Early Cretaceous	Yixian Formation	China	A confuciusornithid	
Corvus moravicus	Sp. nov.	Valid	Jiri Mlikovsky	Early Pleistocene	Stránská Skála	Czech Republic	A corvid	
Eudocimus leiseyi	Sp. nov.	Valid	Steven D. Emslie	Pleistocene	Early Irvingtonian, Bermont Formation	USA: Florida	A threskiornithid	
Grus pagei	Sp. nov.	Valid	Kenneth E. Campbell, jr.	Late Pleistocene	Rancho la Brea	USA: California	A gruid	
Hinasuri nehuensis	Gen. et sp. nov.	Valid	Claudia P. Tambussi	Middle-Late Pliocene	Monte Hermoso Formation	Argentina	A rheid	
Idiornis tuberculata	Sp. nov.	Valid	Dieter S. Peters	Middle Eocene	Messel pit: MP 11	Germany: Hessen	An idiornithid gruiform; the genus was synonymized with the genus Dynamopterus Milne-Edwards, 1892 by Mourer-Chauviré, 2013	
Itardiornis hessae	Gen. et sp. nov.	Valid	Cécile Mourer-Chauviré	Late Eocene and Middle Eocene	MP 21 and MP 23	France	A messelornithid gruiform	
Lagopus balcanicus	Sp. nov.	Valid	ppZlatozar N. Boev	Late Pliocene	MN 17, Middle Villafranchian	Bulgaria	A phasianid	
Larus lacus	Sp. nov.	Valid	Steven D. Emslie	Late Pliocene	Late Blancan	USA: Florida	A larid	
Larus perpetuus	Sp. nov.	Valid	Steven D. Emslie	Late Pliocene	Late Blancan	USA: Florida	A larid	
Meganhinga chilensis	Gen. et sp. nov.	Valid	Herculano M. F. de Alvarenga	Miocene	Cura-Mallín Formation	Chile	An anhingid	
Menura tyawanoides	Sp. nov.	Valid	Walter E. Boles	?Early Miocene	Riversleigh	Australia: Queensland	A menurid	
Messelornis russelli	Sp. nov.	Valid	Cécile Mourer-Chauviré	Late Paleocene	MP 6	France	A messelornithid gruiform	
Phalacrocorax filyawi	Sp. nov.	Valid	Steven D. Emslie	Late Pliocene	Late Blancan	USA: Florida	A phalacrocoracid	
Qinornis paleocenica	Gen. et sp. nov.	Valid	Xue Xiangxu	Early-Middle Paleocene	Shimen Basin	China	An indeterminate neognath	

== Pterosaurs ==
=== New taxa ===
Name	Novelty	Status	Authors	Age	Type locality	Country	Notes	Images
Plataleorhynchus	Gen. et sp. nov	Valid	Howse and Milner	Early Cretaceous	Purbeck Limestone	UK		Plataleorhynchus

== Synapsids ==
=== Mammals ===
==== New taxa ====
Name	Novelty	Status	Authors	Age	Type locality	Country	Notes	Images
Asiavorator	Gen. et sp. nov	Valid	Spassov and Lange-Badré	Late Eocene to early Oligocene	Hsanda Gol Formation	Mongolia	Type species is A. altidens, though this later became a junior synonym of A. gracilis.	Asiavorator limb bones
