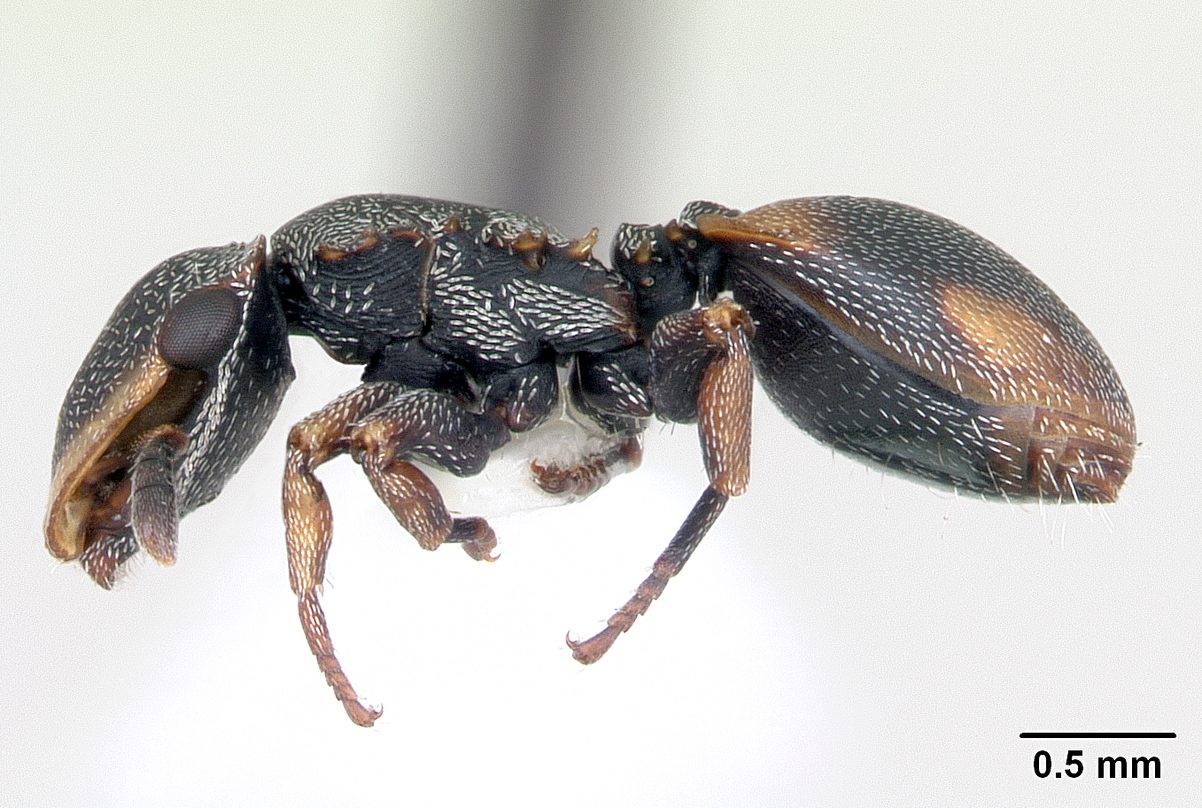
- Cephalotes targionii worker

Scientific classification
- Domain: Eukaryota
- Kingdom: Animalia
- Phylum: Arthropoda
- Class: Insecta
- Order: Hymenoptera
- Family: Formicidae
- Subfamily: Myrmicinae
- Genus: Cephalotes
- Species: C. targionii

Binomial name
- Cephalotes targionii (Emery, 1894)

= Cephalotes targionii =

Species of ant

Cephalotes targionii is a species of arboreal ant of the genus Cephalotes, characterized by an odd shaped head and the ability to "parachute" by steering their fall if they drop off of the tree they are on. Giving their name also as gliding ants.
