= Cephalotes membranaceus =

Scientific classification
- Domain: Eukaryota
- Kingdom: Animalia
- Phylum: Arthropoda
- Class: Insecta
- Order: Hymenoptera
- Family: Formicidae
- Subfamily: Myrmicinae
- Genus: Cephalotes
- Species: C. membranaceus

Binomial name
- Cephalotes membranaceus (Klug, 1824)

Species of ant

Cephalotes membranaceus is a species of arboreal ant of the genus Cephalotes, characterized by an odd shaped head and the ability to "parachute" by steering their fall if they drop off of the tree they're on. Giving their name also as gliding ants. The species is native of the Brazilian states of Rio de Janeiro and Espírito Santo. Their larger and flatter legs, a trait common with other members of the genus Cephalotes, gives them their gliding abilities.

The species was first given a description and a classification in 1824 by German entomologist Johann Christoph Friedrich Klug.
