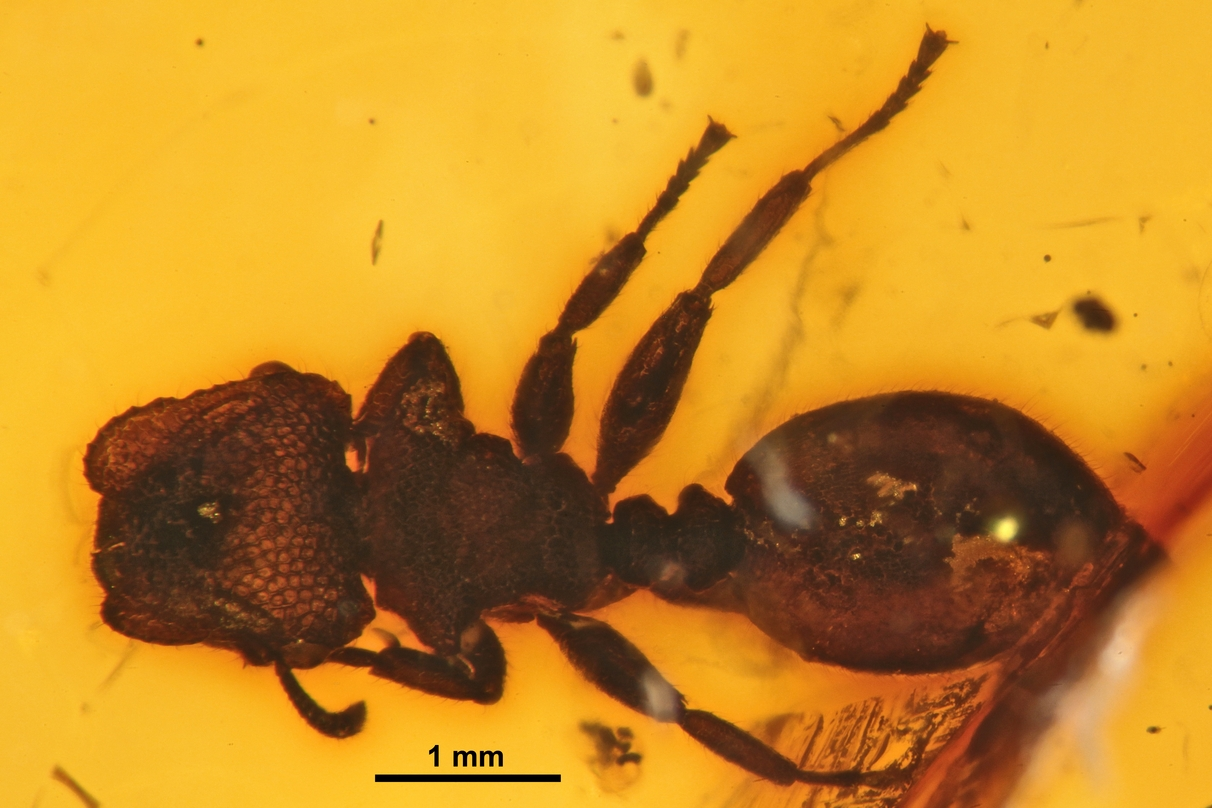
- Holotype in Dominican amber

Scientific classification
- Kingdom: Animalia
- Phylum: Arthropoda
- Clade: Pancrustacea
- Class: Insecta
- Order: Hymenoptera
- Family: Formicidae
- Subfamily: Myrmicinae
- Genus: Cephalotes
- Species: †C. jansei

Binomial name
- †Cephalotes jansei (Vierbergen & Scheven, 1995)

Synonyms
- Exocryptocerus jansei

= Cephalotes jansei =

Extinct species of ant

Cephalotes jansei is an extinct species of arboreal ant of the genus Cephalotes, originally erroneously called Exocryptocerus jansei by its discoverers, characterized by an odd shaped head and the ability to "parachute" by steering their fall if they drop from a tree, giving them the nickname of gliding ants. The species was probably native of Hispaniola, however, lack of more evidence makes this uncertain. Their larger and flatter legs, a trait common with other members of the genus Cephalotes, gave them their gliding abilities.

The species was first given a description and a classification by German entomologists Gijsbertus Vierbergen and Joachim Scheven in 1995. It was subsequently described in Diversity and Adaptation in the Ant Genus Cephalotes Past and Present (Hymenoptera, Formicidae) as a sister group to Cephalotes serratus, possessing slightly larger and more triangular mandibles. It was discovered fossilized in amber on the island of Hispaniola in the Dominican Republic.

== Discovery ==
Cephalotes jansei was probably native of Hispaniola as well as the Lesser Antilles although lack of sufficient evidence makes this uncertain. It was discovered fossilized in Dominican amber, extracted in the Dominican Republic and is dated between the Burdigalian and Langhian ages of the Miocene, which means between 20.44 and 13,82 million years ago.
