= Cephalotes cordatus =

Scientific classification
- Domain: Eukaryota
- Kingdom: Animalia
- Phylum: Arthropoda
- Class: Insecta
- Order: Hymenoptera
- Family: Formicidae
- Subfamily: Myrmicinae
- Genus: Cephalotes
- Species: C. cordatus

Binomial name
- Cephalotes cordatus (Smith, 1853)

Species of ant

Cephalotes cordatus is a species of arboreal ant of the genus Cephalotes, characterized by an odd shaped head and the ability to "parachute" by steering through a long fall; thus their alternative name, gliding ants. The species is native across the north of South America, from the Brazilian state of Minas Gerais to Venezuela, as well as in Bolivia, Peru and Ecuador. Their larger and flatter legs, a trait common with other members of the genus Cephalotes, gives them their gliding abilities.

The species was first given a description and a classification by British entomologist Frederick Smith in 1853.
