= Cephalotes laminatus =

Scientific classification
- Domain: Eukaryota
- Kingdom: Animalia
- Phylum: Arthropoda
- Class: Insecta
- Order: Hymenoptera
- Family: Formicidae
- Subfamily: Myrmicinae
- Genus: Cephalotes
- Species: C. laminatus

Binomial name
- Cephalotes laminatus (Smith, 1860)

Species of ant

Cephalotes laminatus is a species of arboreal ant of the genus Cephalotes, characterized by an odd shaped head, and the ability to "parachute" by steering their fall if they drop off of the tree they're on. Giving their name also as gliding ants.

== Description ==
The species is native of the center of South America, from the Brazilian state of Pará in the east to Ecuador and Peru in the west, as well as in the state of Veracruz in Mexico. Their larger and flatter legs, a trait common with other members of the genus Cephalotes, gives them their gliding abilities.

The species was first given a description and a classification in 1860 by British entomologist Frederick Smith.
