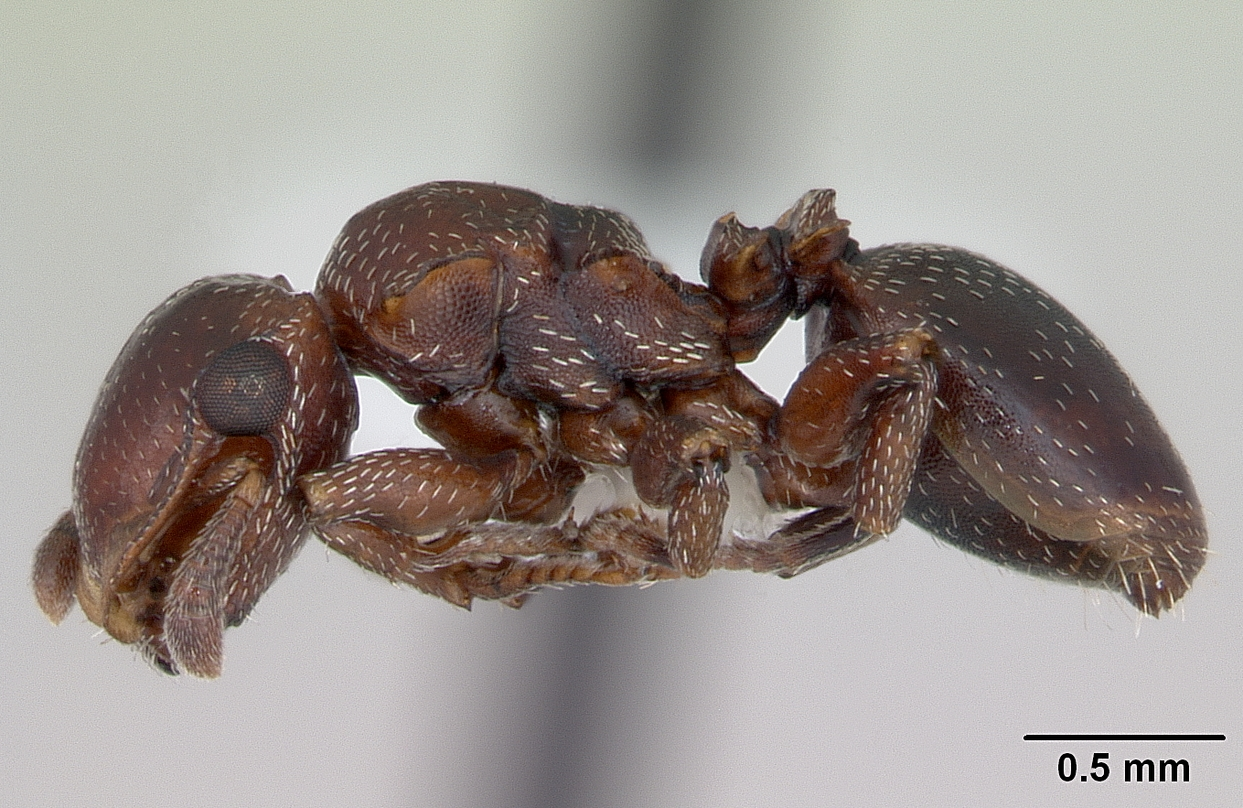
- Cephalotes quadratus worker

Scientific classification
- Domain: Eukaryota
- Kingdom: Animalia
- Phylum: Arthropoda
- Class: Insecta
- Order: Hymenoptera
- Family: Formicidae
- Subfamily: Myrmicinae
- Genus: Cephalotes
- Species: C. quadratus

Binomial name
- Cephalotes quadratus (Mayr, 1868)

= Cephalotes quadratus =

Species of ant

Cephalotes quadratus is a species of arboreal ant of the genus Cephalotes, characterized by an odd, shaped head, and the ability to "parachute" by steering their fall if they drop off of the tree, they're on. Giving their name also as gliding ants.
