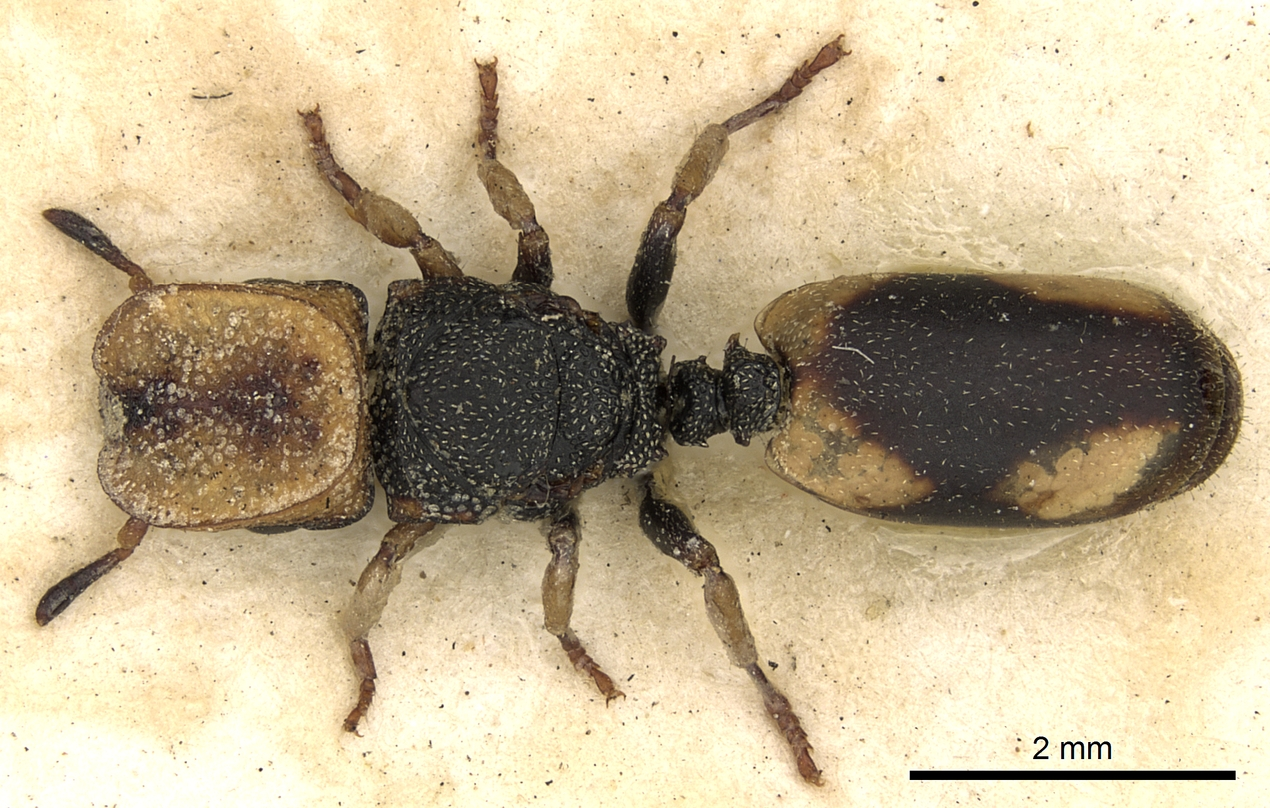

Scientific classification
- Domain: Eukaryota
- Kingdom: Animalia
- Phylum: Arthropoda
- Class: Insecta
- Order: Hymenoptera
- Family: Formicidae
- Subfamily: Myrmicinae
- Genus: Cephalotes
- Species: C. pallidicephalus

Binomial name
- Cephalotes pallidicephalus (Smith, 1876)

= Cephalotes pallidicephalus =

Species of ant

Cephalotes pallidicephalus is a species of arboreal ant of the genus Cephalotes, characterized by an odd shaped head and the ability to "parachute" by steering their fall if they drop off of the tree they are on. Giving their name also as gliding ants.
