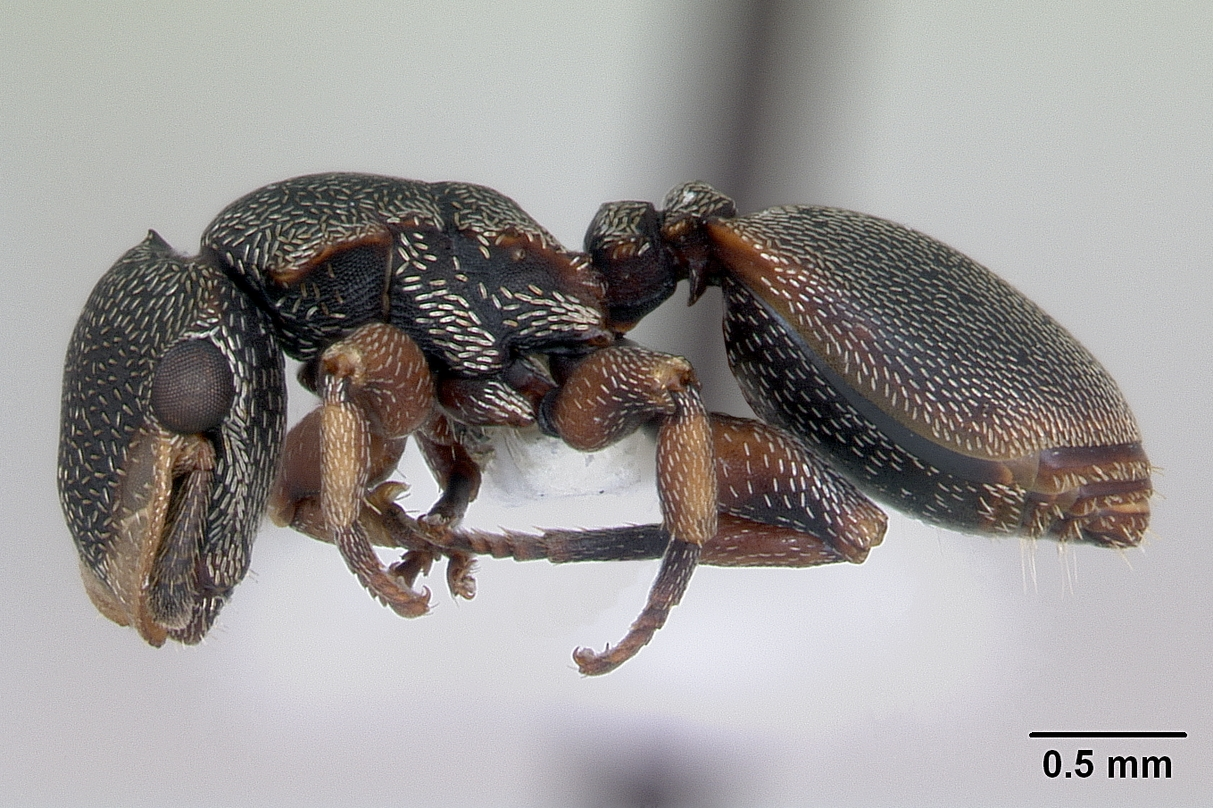

Scientific classification
- Domain: Eukaryota
- Kingdom: Animalia
- Phylum: Arthropoda
- Class: Insecta
- Order: Hymenoptera
- Family: Formicidae
- Subfamily: Myrmicinae
- Genus: Cephalotes
- Species: C. jheringi

Binomial name
- Cephalotes jheringi (Emery, 1894)

= Cephalotes jheringi =

Species of ant

Cephalotes jheringi is a species of arboreal ant of the genus Cephalotes, characterized by an odd shaped head and the ability to "parachute" by steering their fall if they drop off of the tree they are on. Giving their name also as gliding ants.
