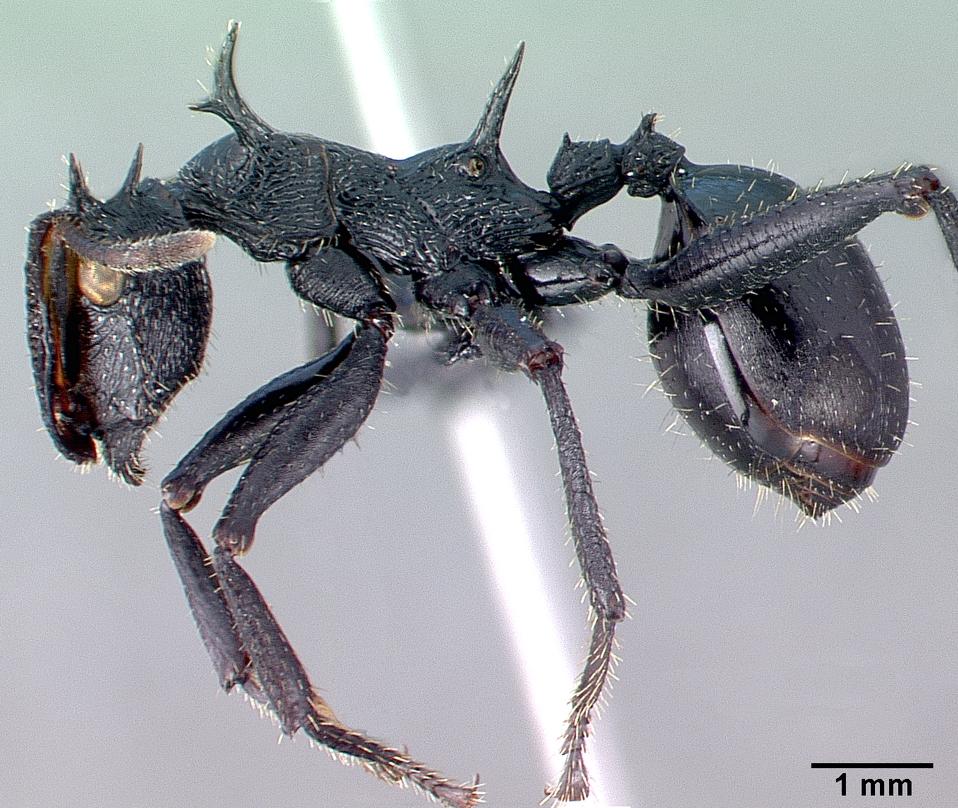
- Cephalotes alfaroi worker

Scientific classification
- Domain: Eukaryota
- Kingdom: Animalia
- Phylum: Arthropoda
- Class: Insecta
- Order: Hymenoptera
- Family: Formicidae
- Subfamily: Myrmicinae
- Genus: Cephalotes
- Species: C. alfaroi

Binomial name
- Cephalotes alfaroi (Emery, 1890)

= Cephalotes alfaroi =

Species of ant

Cephalotes alfaroi is a species of arboreal ant of the genus Cephalotes, characterized by an odd shaped head and the ability to "parachute" by steering their fall if they drop off of the tree they're on. Giving their name also as gliding ants.

The major components of the mandibular gland secretion of C. alfaroi are 4-hepanone and 4-heptanol. Ant alarm pheromones from mandibular gland secretions usually results in an aggressive behaviour. However, ants of the genus Cephalotes are usually unaggressive and use a submissive defences, that includes stopping and lying flat on the surface when alarmed. When worker of C. alfaroi were exposed to crushed ant heads, 4-heptanone, 4-heptanol, or a mixture of these chemicals, they assumed a non-aggressive response.
