= Emiliania =

Emiliania may refer to:

- Emiliania (coccolithophore) (Hay & Mohler) - A genus of coccolithophores described in 1967
- Emiliania (bivalve) (Sánchez) - An extinct genus of bivalves described in 1999 by Sánchez, renamed Emiliodonta in 2010
