= Trigonoconcha =

Trigonoconcha Temporal range: Caradoc 460.9–449.7 Ma

Scientific classification
- Kingdom: Animalia
- Phylum: Mollusca
- Class: Bivalvia
- Order: Nuculida
- Family: †Praenuculidae
- Subfamily: †Praenuculinae
- Genus: †Trigonoconcha
- Species: †T. acuta

Binomial name
- †Trigonoconcha acuta Sánchez, 1999

Other species
- †Trigonoconcha brevis Wang, Zhan & Fang, 2026

Extinct genus of bivalves

Trigonoconcha is an extinct genus of bivalve in the extinct family Praenuculidae. The genus is one of eleven genera in the subfamily Praenuculinae. It is one of three Praenuculinae genera known solely from Late Ordivician, Caradoc epoch, with fossils found in South America and China. Trigonoconcha currently contains two accepted species, Trigonoconcha acuta and Trigonoconcha brevis.

== Description ==
Trigonoconcha acuta was first described in 1999 by Teresa M. Sánchez from fossils from sediments of the late Middle Ordivician, Caradocian aged Don Braulio Formation. The formation outcrops on the flank of Sierra de Villicum in the Argentina precordillera.

The shells of Trigonoconcha have anterior and posterior sides which meet at an angle of no more than sixty-five degrees. While this is similar to the related genera Palaeoconcha and Similodonta, they are both noted for anterior-posterior angles of no less than ninety degrees. The presence of an auricle, a finger-like projection on the underside of the umbo, in Palaeoconcha also distinguishes specimens from Trigonoconcha. Similodonta is distinguished from both other genera by an edentulous space, a region on the hinge that lacks teeth. The umbo of Trigonoconcha is located at the vertex formed by the anterior and posterior sides and the ventral margin forms a broad curving edge. On smaller shells, possibly from immature specimens, the ventral margin curves abruptly to meet the anterior and posterior margins creating a triangular shell outline.

The anterior edge is host to up to fifteen teeth while the posterior edge has a maximum of ten. The Trigonoconcha ranges in shell length from 2.2 to 6.0 millimetres (0.087 to 0.236 in) and has a height between 2.5 and 7.0 millimetres (0.098 and 0.276 in). When described, the genus name Trigonoconcha was chosen by Sánchez in reference to the triangle created by the anterior and posterior margins of the shell. Similarly, the species epithet acuta was coined as a reference to the acute angle formed by the anterior and posterior margins.

Trigonoconcha was described from one holotype specimen, number CEGH-UNC 16158, which is an internal mold of a left valve. A series of twelve other right and left valve molds were also examined and used in the description. The specimens are currently deposited in the Department of Geology paleontology collections in the National University of Córdoba.
