= Villicumia =

Villicumia Temporal range: Caradoc 460.9–449.7 Ma

Scientific classification
- Domain: Eukaryota
- Kingdom: Animalia
- Phylum: Mollusca
- Class: Bivalvia
- Order: Nuculida
- Family: †Praenuculidae
- Subfamily: †Praenuculinae
- Genus: †Villicumia
- Species: †V. canteraensis

Binomial name
- †Villicumia canteraensis Sánchez, 1999

Extinct genus of bivalves

Villicumia is an extinct genus of bivalve in the extinct family Praenuculidae. The genus is one of eleven genera in the subfamily Praenuculinae. It is one of three Praenuculinae genera known solely from late Ordovician, Caradoc epoch, fossils found in South America. Villicumia currently contains a single accepted species, Villicumia canteraensis.

== Description ==
Villicumia canteraensis was first described in 1999 by Teresa M. Sánchez from fossils in sediments of the late Middle Ordovician, Caradocian aged Don Braulio Formation. The formation outcrops on the flank of Sierra de Villicum in the Argentina precordillera. The shells of V. canteraensis lack a thickened ligament on the hinge, called a resilifer, in combination with the rear portion of the shell being rounded, indicate V. canteraensis is a member of Praenuculidae. The hinge displays the chevroning of teeth with a concavity in the chevron facing towards the center of the hinge and the umbo. This tooth structure is typical of the subfamily Praenuculinae. However the structuring of the teeth is noted to be different in aspects from any other members of Praenuculidae, having an incline to the teeth similar to the genera Dysodonta and Koenenia of the family Malletiidae. The shells of V. canteraensis are also noted for possessing overlapping rows of posterior and anterior teeth, a feature seen in few bivalve genera. V. canteraensis ranges in shell length from 1.6 to 7.0 millimetres (0.063 to 0.276 in) and has a height between 1.8 and 7.0 millimetres (0.071 and 0.276 in). When described, the genus name Villicumia was chosen by Sánchez in reference to Sierra de Villicum where the type locality is. Similarly the species epithet canteraensis was coined as a reference to the La Cantera Formation which is directly overlain by the Don Braulio Formation at Sierra de Villicum.
