= Cephalotes obscurus =

Scientific classification
- Kingdom: Animalia
- Phylum: Arthropoda
- Clade: Pancrustacea
- Class: Insecta
- Order: Hymenoptera
- Family: Formicidae
- Subfamily: Myrmicinae
- Genus: Cephalotes
- Species: †C. obscurus

Binomial name
- †Cephalotes obscurus (Vierbergen & Scheven 1995)

Extinct species of ant

Cephalotes obscurus is an extinct species of arboreal ant of the genus Cephalotes, characterized by an odd shaped head and the ability to "parachute" by steering their fall if they drop off of the tree they're on. Giving their name also as gliding ants. The species was probably native to Hispaniola, however, lack of more evidence makes this uncertain. Their larger and flatter legs, a trait common with other members of the genus Cephalotes, gave them their gliding abilities.

The species was first given a description and a classification in 1995 by German entomologists Gijsbertus Vierbergen and Joachim Scheven. It was discovered fosillized in amber on the island of Hispaniola in the Dominican Republic.

== Discovery ==
This species, probably native to Hispaniola as well as the Lesser Antilles, although lack of sufficient evidence makes this uncertain. It was discovered fossilized in Dominican amber, extracted in the Dominican Republic and is dated between the Burdigalian and Langhian ages of the Miocene, which means between 20.44 and 13,82 million years ago.
