= Cuyopsis =

Cuyopsis Temporal range: Caradoc 460.9–449.7 Ma

Scientific classification
- Domain: Eukaryota
- Kingdom: Animalia
- Phylum: Mollusca
- Class: Bivalvia
- Order: Nuculida
- Family: †Praenuculidae
- Subfamily: †Praenuculinae
- Genus: †Cuyopsis
- Species: †C. symmetricus

Binomial name
- †Cuyopsis symmetricus Sánchez, 1999

Extinct genus of bivalves

Cuyopsis is an extinct genus of bivalve in the extinct family Praenuculidae. The genus is one of eleven genera in the subfamily Praenuculinae. It is one of three Praenuculinae genera known solely from late Ordivician, Caradoc epoch, fossils found in South America. Cuyopsis currently contains a single accepted species, Cuyopsis symmetricus.

== Description ==
Cuyopsis symmetricus was first described in 1999 by Teresa M. Sánchez from fossils in sediments of the late Middle Ordivician, Caradocian aged Don Braulio Formation. The formation outcrops on the flank of Sierra de Villicum in the Argentina precordillera. Generally the shells of Cuyopsis symmetricus are rectangular in outline and notably symmetrical. The shells have an umbo positioned centrally on the rear edge of the shell, with the umbo beak being orthogyrate, thus curving downwards perpendicular to the hinge. The shell hinges have a series of eleven convexodont teeth along the posterior edge and a series of ten convexodont teeth on the anterior edge and the two series meet at the umbo. C. symmetricus ranges in shell length from 8.0 to 11.0 millimetres (0.31 to 0.43 in) and has a height between 7.3 and 8.0 millimetres (0.29 and 0.31 in). As a member of Praenuculinae, the hinge displays the chevroning of teeth typical of the subfamily. The teeth have a concavity in the chevron facing towards the center of the hinge and the umbo. When described, the genus name Cuyopsis was chosen by Sánchez in reference to the Cuyo region where the type locality is. The species epithet symmetricus was coined as a reference to the notably symmetrical nature of the valves.
