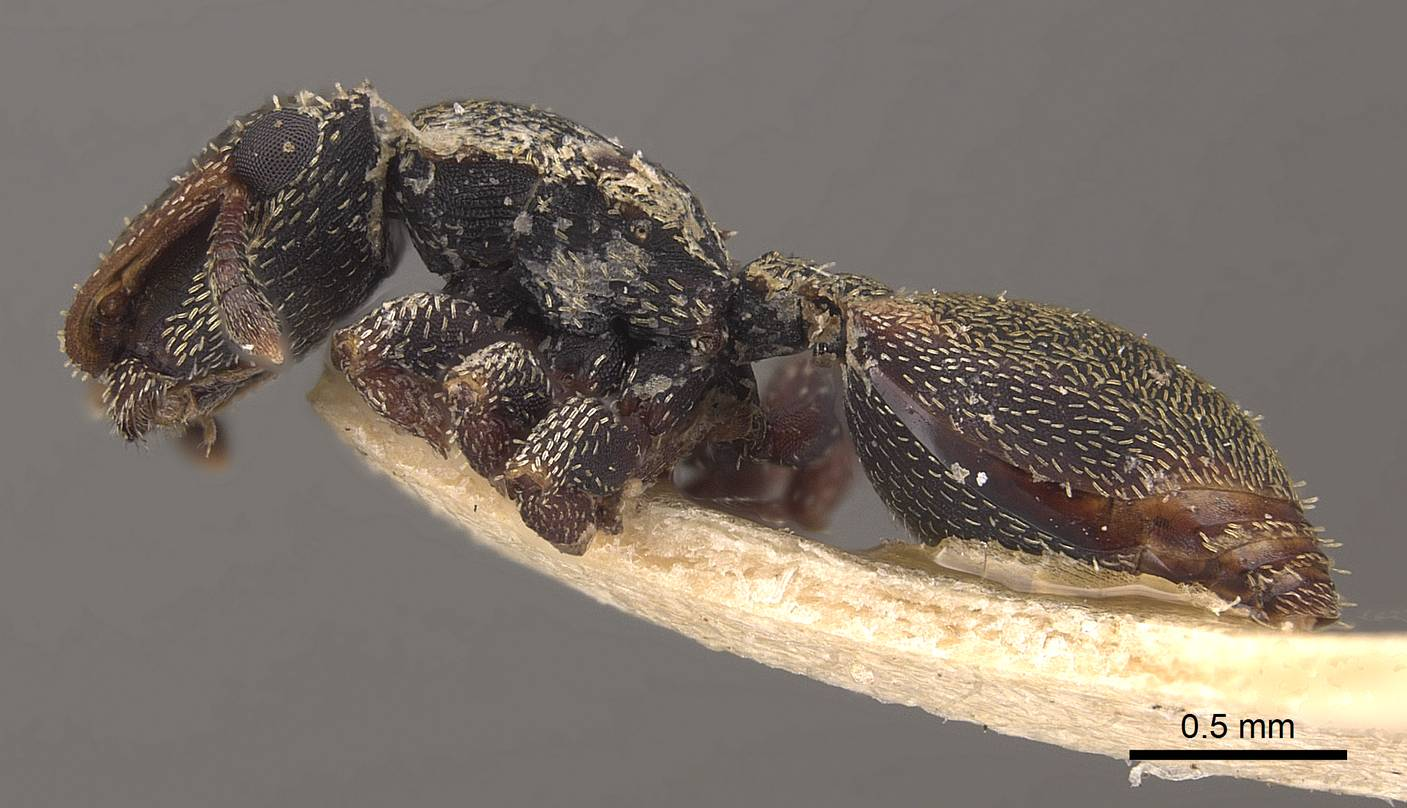

Scientific classification
- Domain: Eukaryota
- Kingdom: Animalia
- Phylum: Arthropoda
- Class: Insecta
- Order: Hymenoptera
- Family: Formicidae
- Subfamily: Myrmicinae
- Genus: Cephalotes
- Species: C. coffeae

Binomial name
- Cephalotes coffeae (Kempf, 1953)

= Cephalotes coffeae =

Species of ant

Cephalotes coffeae is a species of arboreal ant of the genus Cephalotes, characterized by an odd shaped head, and the ability to "parachute" by steering their fall if they drop off of the tree they are on. Giving their name also as gliding ants.
