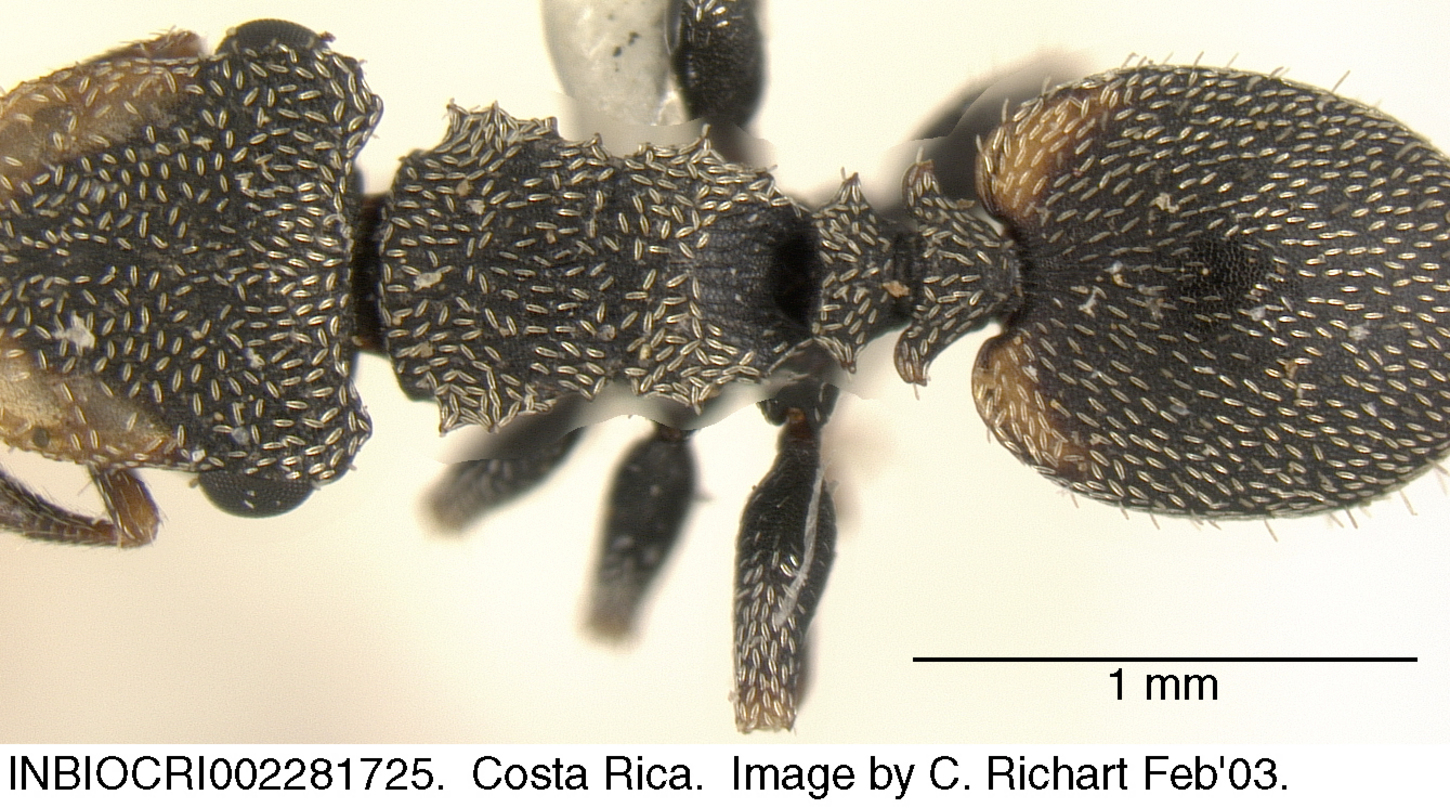

Scientific classification
- Domain: Eukaryota
- Kingdom: Animalia
- Phylum: Arthropoda
- Class: Insecta
- Order: Hymenoptera
- Family: Formicidae
- Subfamily: Myrmicinae
- Genus: Cephalotes
- Species: C. peruviensis

Binomial name
- Cephalotes peruviensis De Andrade, 1999

= Cephalotes peruviensis =

Species of ant

Cephalotes peruviensis is a species of arboreal ant of the genus Cephalotes, characterized by an odd shaped head and the ability to "parachute" by steering their fall if they drop off of the tree they're on. Giving their name also as gliding ants. They can be found in Peru, Costa Rica, and the Osa Peninsula.
