= Hemiconcavodonta =

Hemiconcavodonta Temporal range: Caradoc 460.9–449.7 Ma

Scientific classification
- Domain: Eukaryota
- Kingdom: Animalia
- Phylum: Mollusca
- Class: Bivalvia
- Order: Nuculida
- Family: †Praenuculidae
- Subfamily: †Concavodontinae
- Genus: †Hemiconcavodonta; Sánchez, 1999
- Species: †H. minuta

Binomial name
- †Hemiconcavodonta minuta Sánchez, 1999

Extinct genus of bivalves

Hemiconcavodonta is an extinct genus of bivalve in the extinct family Praenuculidae. The genus is one of three genera in the subfamily Concavodontinae. Hemiconcavodonta is known solely from late Ordovician, Caradoc epoch, fossils found in South America. The genus currently contains a single accepted species, Hemiconcavodonta minuta.

== Description ==
Hemiconcavodonta minuta is a bivalve which was first described in 1999 by Teresa M. Sánchez from fossils from sediments of the late Middle Ordovician, Caradocian-aged Don Braulio Formation. The formation outcrops on the flank of Sierra de Villicum in the Argentina precordillera. Generally the shells of Hemiconcavodonta minuta are ovate to rounded and moderately inflated. The small shells have an umbo positioned subcentrally on the posterior edge of the shell and nine to ten teeth in the hinge structure. H. minuta ranges in shell length from 3.0 to 6.3 millimetres (0.12 to 0.25 in) and has a height between 2.0 and 3.0 millimetres (0.079 and 0.118 in). As a member of Concavodontinae, the hinge displays the chevroning of teeth typical of the subfamily. The teeth have a concavity in the chevron which faces away from the center of the hinge and the umbo. However the teeth of Hemiconcavodonta are unique in the subfamily with only the posterior teeth being concavodont, while the anterior teeth are convexodont thus facing towards the hinges center. The genus name is in reference to the tooth structure being both concavodont and convexodont. The overall small size of H. minuta shells is the basis for the etymology of the specific name.

A solitary fossil from the same location as H. minuta has the same convexodont/concavodont tooth structure as H. minuta. However the placement of the umbo and anterior adductor muscle plus tooth size in the solitary fossil do not match H. minuta and thus Sánchez did not place the specimen into H. minuta.
