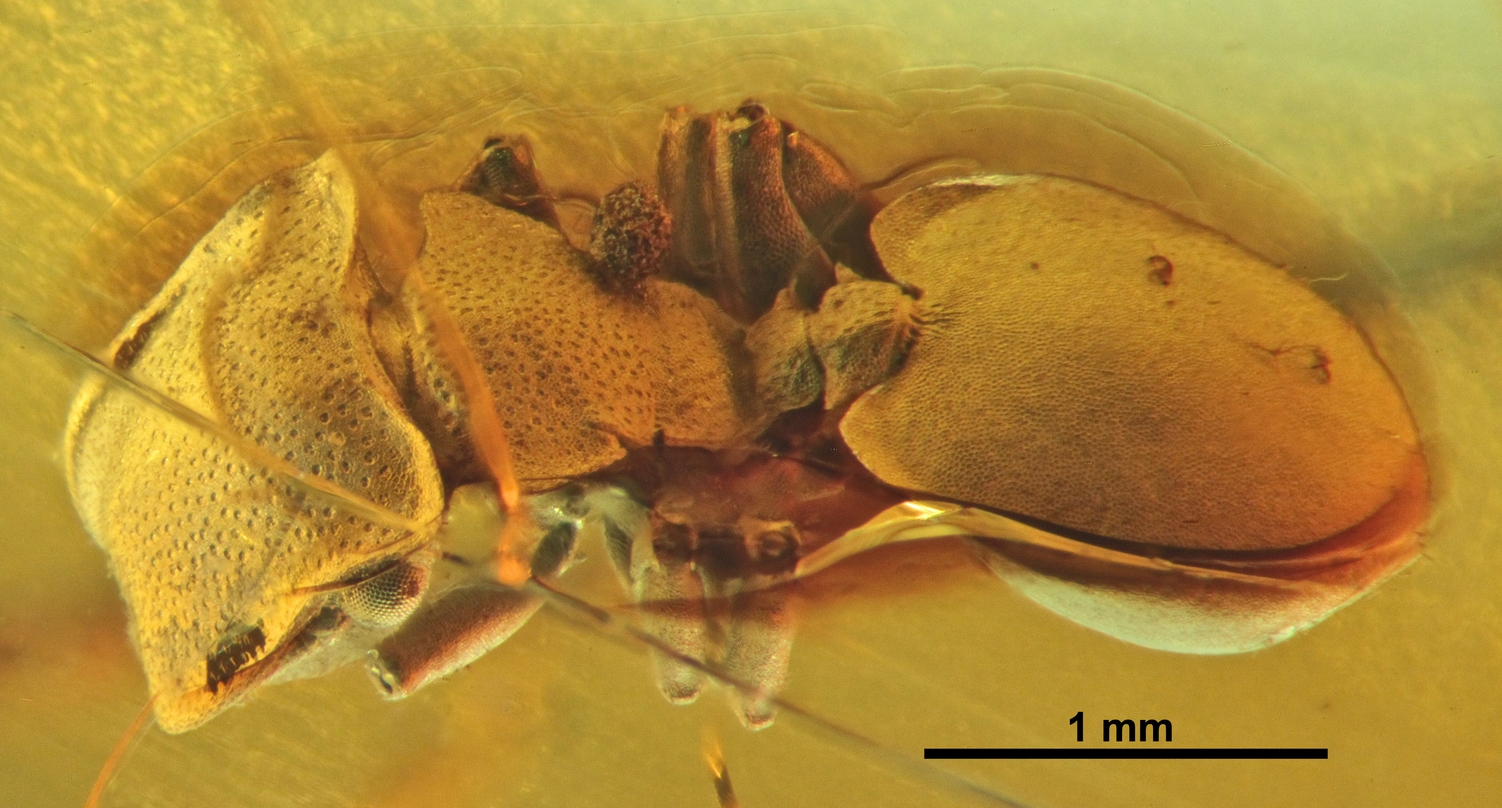
- Dorsal view of Cephalotes integerrimus

Scientific classification
- Kingdom: Animalia
- Phylum: Arthropoda
- Class: Insecta
- Order: Hymenoptera
- Family: Formicidae
- Subfamily: Myrmicinae
- Genus: Cephalotes
- Species: †C. integerrimus

Binomial name
- †Cephalotes integerrimus (Vierbergen & Scheven, 1995)

= Cephalotes integerrimus =

Extinct species of ant

Cephalotes integerrimus is an extinct species of arboreal ant of the genus Cephalotes, characterized by an odd shaped head and the ability to "parachute" by steering their fall if they drop off of the tree they're on. Giving their name also as gliding ants. Their larger and flatter legs, a trait common with other members of the genus Cephalotes, gave them their gliding abilities.

The species was first given a description and a classification by German entomologists Gijsbertus Vierbergen and Joachim Scheven in 1995. It was discovered fosillized in amber on the island of Hispaniola in the Dominican Republic.

The holotype of the species measures 3.80 × 1.00 millimetres

== Discovery ==
This species, probably native to Hispaniola as well as the Lesser Antilles, although lack of sufficient evidence makes this uncertain. It was discovered fossilized in Dominican amber, extracted in the Dominican Republic and is dated between the Burdigalian and Langhian ages of the Miocene, which means between 20.44 and 13,82 million years ago.

The specimen which permitted the identification of this species was recovered from a gift shop of Hispaniola.
