= Concavodontinae =

Concavodontinae Temporal range: Caradoc to Ashgill 460.9–443.7 Ma

Scientific classification
- Kingdom: Animalia
- Phylum: Mollusca
- Class: Bivalvia
- Order: Nuculida
- Family: †Praenuculidae
- Subfamily: †Concavodontinae; Sánchez, 1999

Genera
- Concavodonta; Emiliodonta; Hemiconcavodonta

Extinct subfamily of bivalves

Concavodontinae is an extinct subfamily of prehistoric bivalves in the family Praenuculidae. Concavodontinae species lived from the middle Ordovician, Caradoc epoch through the late Ordovician Ashgill epoch. Concavodontinae fossils are found in Europe and South America, and species are thought to have been stationary attached to substrate in shallow infaunal marine water environments where they formed shells of an aragonite composition. The subfamily Concavodontinae was named by Teresa M. Sánchez in 1999.

== Description ==
Concavodontinae is composed of three described genera and a total of five described species. The type genus Concavodonta is composed of three species found in Bavaria, France, and Argentina. The second genus, Emiliodonta, and third genus Hemiconcavodonta are both monotypic, and known only from the Argentine precordillera. Concavodonta is a small bivalve which was first described in 1972 by Claude Babin and Michel Melou. The structuring of the shell in Concavodonta has been noted to be anomalous. While several specimens from other taxa, such as Praeleda costae and Ctenodonta have been found with occasional concavodont teeth, they are not typical. All genera in Concavodontinae are identified by the hinge displaying chevron shaped teeth where the concavity in the chevron faces the center of the hinge and the umbo. In both Concavodonta and Emiliodonta both the anterior and posterior rows of teeth in the shell face outwards away from the umbo. In Hemiconcavodonta only the posterior teeth are concavodont, while the anterior teeth are convexodont and thus facing away from the hinges center. Concavodontinae differs from the second subfamily in Praenuculidae, Praenuculinae, whose members are identified by tooth chevrons with concavities facing the outer edges of the shell and chevron points facing the umbo.
