= Praenuculidae =

Praenuculidae Temporal range: Ordovician - Devonian 487–391 Ma

Scientific classification
- Kingdom: Animalia
- Phylum: Mollusca
- Class: Bivalvia
- Order: Nuculida
- Superfamily: Nuculoidea
- Family: †Praenuculidae; McAlester, 1969

Subfamilies
- See text

Extinct family of bivalves

Praenuculidae is an extinct family of prehistoric bivalves in the superfamily Nuculoidea. Praenuculidae species lived from the early Ordovician, Arenig stage through the Early Devonian Emsian stage. Praenuculidae fossils are found worldwide, present on every continent except Antarctica. Species in this family are thought to have been sessile, attached to the substrate in shallow infaunal marine water environments, where they formed shells of an aragonite composition. The family Praenuculidae was named by A. Lee McAlester in 1969.

== Description ==
Praenuculidae first emerged in the early Ordovician and diversified from around 6 genera in the early Orodvician to a maximum of thirteen genera by the Late Ordovician. As a result of the Ordovician–Silurian extinction event the family was reduced to three genera during the Silurian and by the end of the Devonian the family was entirely extinct.

The family is composed of up to seventeen genera, most divided between the two described subfamilies erected by Teresa M. Sánchez in 1999. The structure of the chevroned hinge teeth is the dominant feature by which members of Praenuculidae are divided between the two subfamilies. The majority of Praenuculidae genera possess teeth with a chevron concavity that faces towards the outer sides of the shell and a chevron point facing the umbo. These genera are grouped into the larger subfamily, Praenuculinae. Three of the genera are placed into the second subfamily, Concavodontinae, based on the teeth having chevron concavities which face in the reverse, towards the center of the hinge and points facing the outside edges of the shell.

In the original 1999 description of the subfamilies, Cardiolaria was not placed into a specific subfamily due to the uncertain family affinities of the genus. Cardiolaria was placed in Praenuculidae by McAlester in 1969 with the original description of the family. It was suggested by John C. Cope in 1997 that the genus may belong elsewhere in the subclass Protobranchia, formerly called Palaeotaxodonta. Both Deceptrix and Cardiolaria are currently accepted as members of the family Cardiolariidae erected by Cope in 1997. The genus Eritropis was formerly included in the family, however it was moved to a new family, Eritropidae by John C. Cope in 2000.

== Genera ==
- Concavodontinae
  - Concavodonta
  - Emiliodonta (syn. Emiliania)
  - Hemiconcavodonta
- Praenuculinae
  - Cuyopsis
  - Fidera
  - Ledopsis
  - Palaeoconcha
  - Paulinea
  - Pensarnia
  - Praeleda
  - Praenucula (type genus)
  - Trigonoconcha
  - Similodonta
  - Villicumia
- incertae sedis
  - Pseudonucula

A number of genera which were placed in the family have been moved to other families. They include:

- Cardiolariidae
  - Cardiolaria (syn. Honeymania)
  - Deceptrix
  - Inaequidens
