= Praenuculinae =

Praenuculinae Temporal range: Ordovician - Devonian 487–391 Ma

Scientific classification
- Kingdom: Animalia
- Phylum: Mollusca
- Class: Bivalvia
- Order: Nuculida
- Family: †Praenuculidae
- Subfamily: †Praenuculinae; Sánchez, 1999

Genera
- See text

Extinct subfamily of bivalves

Praenuculinae is an extinct subfamily of prehistoric bivalves in the family Praenuculidae. Praenuculinae species lived from the middle Ordovician through the late Devonian. Praenuculinae fossils are found in Europe, Africa, North America and South America, and species are thought to have been stationary attached to substrate in shallow infaunal marine water environments where they formed shells of an aragonite composition. The subfamily Praenuculinae was named by Teresa M. Sánchez in 1999.

== Description ==
The majority of Praenuculidae genera possess teeth with a chevron concavity that faces towards the outer sides of the shell and a chevron point facing the umbo. These genera are grouped into the larger subfamily, Praenuculinae. Three of the genera in the family are placed into the second subfamily, Concavodontinae, based on the teeth having chevron concavities which face in the reverse, towards the center of the hinge and points facing the outside edges of the shell.

Praenuculinae is composed of eleven described genera including Praenucula, the type genus for the family. Praenucula is composed of six species found across Europe, in northwestern Africa, and Argentina. Three of the genera, Cuyopsis, Trigonoconcha, and Villicumia are monotypic and known only from the Argentine precordillera. The monotypic Fidera was first described in 1977 by John Pojeta & Joyce Gilbert-Tomlinson and is known only from Tasmania. Ledopsis was named in 1884 and is restricted to Ordovician sediments exposed in Europe. Leo Pfab in 1934 erected the genus Praeleda from bohemian fossils which had been placed as the species Nucula compar by Joachim Barrande. The 1969 Treatise on Invertebrate Paleontology volume on bivalves placed Praeleda as a synonym of the genus Deceptrix, a placement that was not fully accepted by subsequent authors. In 1999 Cope suggested the two genera were distinct, an opinion that has since been accepted. Palaeoconcha is known from at least four species ranging across Europe, Asia, North America, and South America. Both Paulinea and Pensarnia were described by Cope in 1997 from fossils found in early Arenig sediments of South Wales. The genus Similodonta is known from several species which range across North America, Asia, and Europe.

The genus Eritropis was formerly included in the subfamily, however it was moved to a new family, Eritropidae by John C. Cope in 2000. Deceptrix was included in Praenuculinae and the genus Cardiolaria was listed in Praenuculidae, without subfamily placement, by Teresa M. Sánchez in her 1999 description of the Praenuculidae subfamilies. However both Deceptrix and Cardiolaria are currently accepted as members of the family Cardiolariidae erected by Cope in 1997.

== Genera ==
- Cuyopsis
- Fidera
- Ledopsis
- Palaeoconcha
- Paulinea
- Pensarnia
- Praeleda
- Praenucula (type genus)
- Trigonoconcha
- Similodonta
- Villicumia
