= Concavodonta =

Concavodonta Temporal range: Caradoc to Ashgill 460.9–443.7 Ma

Scientific classification
- Domain: Eukaryota
- Kingdom: Animalia
- Phylum: Mollusca
- Class: Bivalvia
- Order: Nuculida
- Family: †Praenuculidae
- Subfamily: †Concavodontinae
- Genus: †Concavodonta; Babin & Melou, 1972

Species
- C. imbricata; C. ovalis; C. ponderata

Extinct genus of bivalves

Concavodonta is an extinct genus of early bivalve in the extinct family Praenuculidae. The genus is one of three genera in the subfamily Concavodontinae. Concavodonta is known solely from late Ordovician, Caradoc epoch, fossils found in Europe and South America. The genus currently contains three accepted species, Concavodonta imbricata, Concavodonta ovalis and the type species Concavodonta ponderata.

== Description ==
Concavodonta is a small bivalve which was first described in 1972 by Claude Babin and Michel Melou. Generally the shells of Concavodonta are fairly rounded to ovoid in shape. As the type genus for the subfamily Concavodontinae, the hinge displays the typical chevroning of teeth where the concavity in the chevron faces away from the center of the hinge and the umbo. The adductor muscles for the shell are unequal in shape. The external surface of the shells show regular concentric ornamentation.

The type species for the genus, Concavodonta ponderata, has been found in Middle to late Ordovician, Caradoc epoch sediments of Europe. The species was first described in 1881 by Joachim Barrande as Nucula ponderata. The species has been found in three Bohemian formations, the Bohdalec, Vinice, and Zahorany. It has since been found in the Late Ordovician sediments of Normandy, France. C. ponderata can be distinguished from the other two species in the genus by the structuring of the structure of the hinge plate, which is curved in C. imbricata, and by the overall shell outline, which is ovoid in C. ovalis.

Concavodonta imbricata was described by Joseph Ellison Portlock as Nucula acuta? var imbricata based on a holotype specimen which has since been lost. With the reexamination of the species in 1982 by Steve Tunnicliff a lectotype specimen, NMI G.1. 1979 for the species which is deposited in the National Museum of Ireland, Dublin. The fossils are found in sediments of the late Ordivician, Cautleyan aged Killey Bridge Formation which outcrops near Pomeroy, County Tyrone in Northern Ireland. The species ranges in shell length from 3.8 to 9.4 millimetres (0.15 to 0.37 in) and has a height between 2.4 and 6.6 millimetres (0.094 and 0.260 in).

The third species of Concavodonta to be described, Concavodonta ovalis, is from sediments of the late Middle Ordivician, Caradocian aged Don Braulio Formation. The formation outcrops on the flank of Sierra de Villicum in the Argentina precordillera. The overall shape of C. ovalis shells, oval, is the base for the etymology of the specific name. The shells have an umbo positioned subcentrally on the posterior edge of the shell and nine to ten teeth in the hinge structure. Concavodonta ovalis ranges in shell length from 7.0 to 9.7 millimetres (0.28 to 0.38 in) and has a height between 6.5 and 8.0 millimetres (0.26 and 0.31 in).
