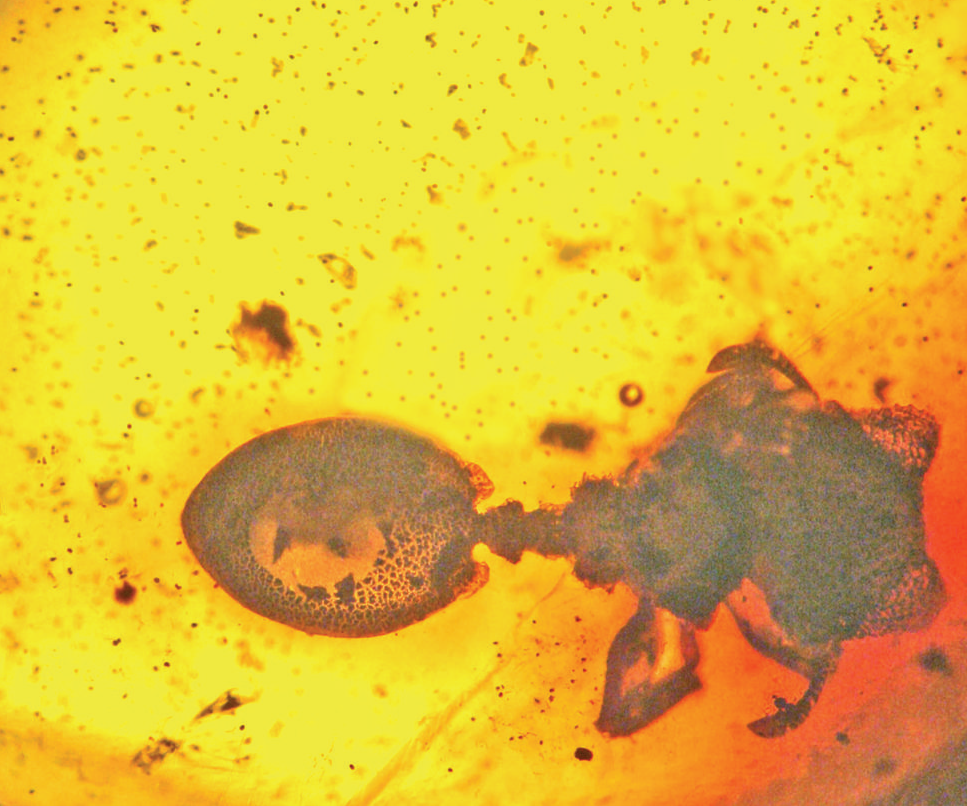
- Cephalotes Serratus

Scientific classification
- Domain: Eukaryota
- Kingdom: Animalia
- Phylum: Arthropoda
- Class: Insecta
- Order: Hymenoptera
- Family: Formicidae
- Subfamily: Myrmicinae
- Genus: Cephalotes
- Species: †C. serratus

Binomial name
- †Cephalotes serratus (Vierbergen & Scheven, 1995)

= Cephalotes serratus =

Species of ant

Cephalotes serratus is a species of arboreal ant of the genus Cephalotes that has been found preserved in amber. They display the odd shaped head characteristic of gliding ants.
