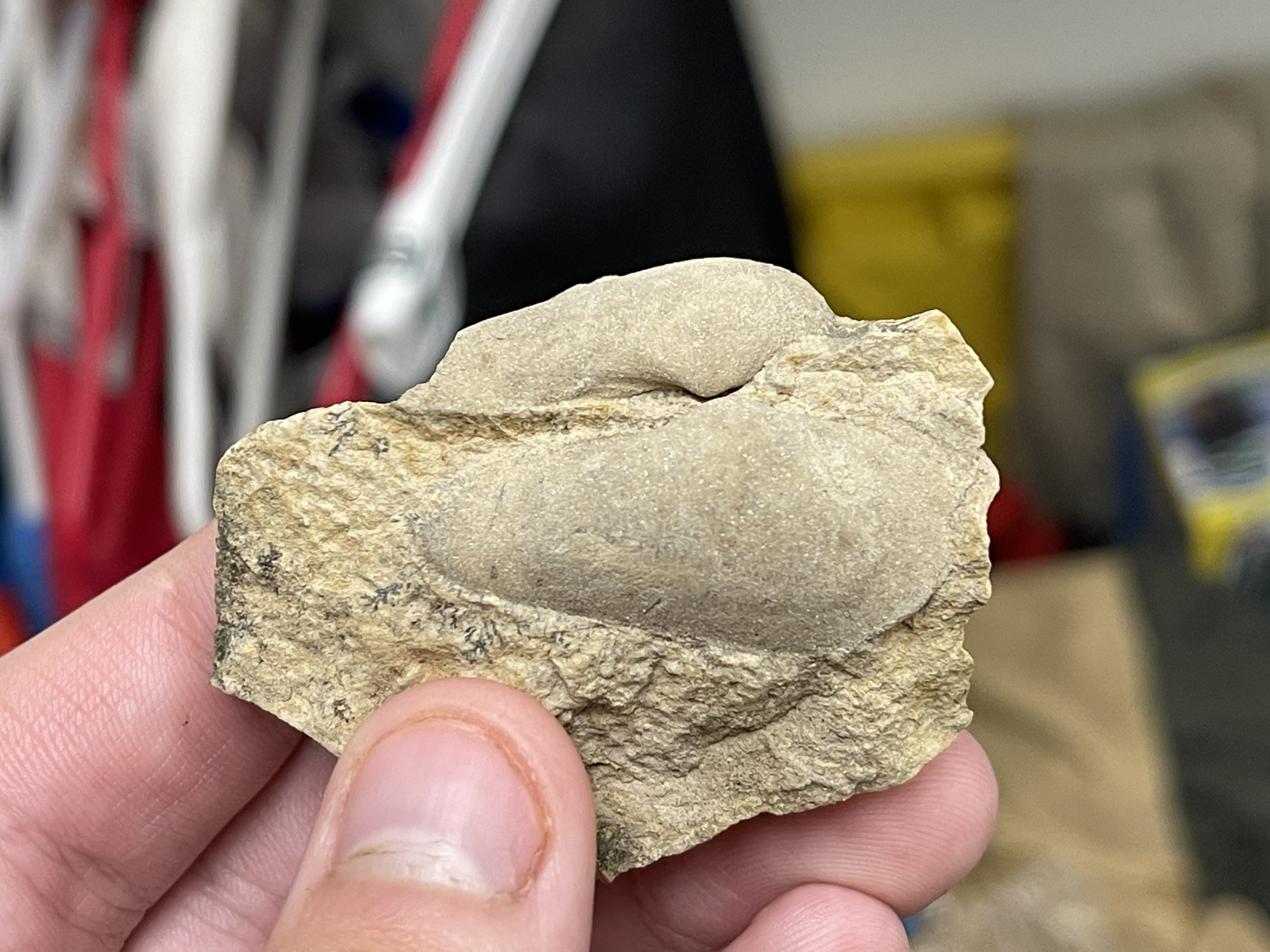
- A fossil specimen of Similodonta from the upper Ordovician aged Sinnipee group in Wisconsin

Scientific classification
- Kingdom: Animalia
- Phylum: Mollusca
- Class: Bivalvia
- Order: Nuculida
- Family: †Praenuculidae
- Subfamily: †Praenuculinae
- Genus: †Similodonta; Soot-Ryen, 1964

Species
- See text

= Similodonta =

Similodonta Temporal range: Caradoc to Ashgill 460.9–443.7 Ma

Extinct genus of bivalves

Similodonta is an extinct genus of early bivalve in the extinct family Praenuculidae. The genus is one of eleven genera in the subfamily Praenuculinae. Similodonta is known from Middle Ordovician through Middle Silurian fossils found in Europe and North America. The genus currently contains eight accepted species, Similodonta ceryx, Similodonta collina, Similodonta djupvikensis, Similodonta magna, Smilodonta minor, Similodonta recurva, Similodonta spjeldnaesi, Similodonta wahli and the type species Similodonta similis.

== Description ==
Similodonta is a small bivalve which was first described in 1964 by Helen Soot-Ryen in an Arkiv för Mineralogi och Geologi, Kungliga Svenska Vetenskapsakademien paper. Generally the shells of Similodonta are rounded on the ventral sides of the shell and triangular on the dorsal sides. The triangular shape on the dorsal side is formed by the sharp angle at which the anterior and posterior hinge edges meet at the umbo. Similodonta species are similar in shape to species of the related genus Palaeoconcha. The two genera can be separated based on the presence of an auricle, a projection on the inside of the shell, in Palaeoconcha species. One of the notable features in Similodonta is the angle at which the anterior and posterior shell edges meet. In the type description of the genus, Soot-Ryen described the angle as near 80°, subsequent examinations of the type specimens and further fossils have shown the angle to in fact be near 90°.

The type species for the genus, Similodonta similis, has been found in Late Ordovician, Ashgill epoch, sediments of the upper Richmond Group exposed near Spring Valley, Minnesota. The species was first described in 1892 by Edward Oscar Ulrich as Tellinomya similis.

Similodonta ceryx was described by John C. W. Cope in 1999 from the internal mold of a single right valve. The specimen was recovered from a depth of 108.90 metres (357.3 ft) in a borehole near Llanwrtyd Wells, Wales. S. ceryx is the oldest species to be assigned to the genus, dating from the Caradocian Aurelucian Stage.

Of similar age to the North American species, Similodonta collina is known from Ashgillian age fossils found in Scotland. Described in 1946 by Reed, the species is more inflated and larger than S. ceryx.

Similodonta djupvikensis is one of the youngest species in the genus, dating from the Wenlock epoch of the Silurian. Found on the Swedish island of Gotland in the Baltic Sea, the species was described by Soot-Ryen in 1964. As with S. similis, S. recurva, and S. spjeldnaesi, S. djupvikensis is stouter and has a more robust hinge plate then that seen in S. ceryx.

Another united kingdom species, Similodonta magna was described in 1946 by Lamont and is known from Ashgillian fossils found near the Scottish coastal town of Girvan. While similar in morphology to S. ceryx, S. magna is distinguished by the stronger curve in the posterior edge and muscle scars that are not as distinct.

Also in the Richmond group of North America is the species Similodonta recurva. This species was named in the same 1892 paper by Ulrich as S. similis.

Similodonta spjeldnaesi is a late Ordovician species found in and described from the Upper Chasmops Shale, Ringerike, Norway. The species was described in 1960 by Helen Soot-Ryen and Tron Soot-Ryen as noted, the species has a more robust hinge plate and is stouter then S. ceryx.

Dating from the Latest Ordovician, the species Similodonta wahli was described in 1991 by Isakar from fossils found in the Ärina Formation of Northern Estonia.
