= Emiliodonta =

Emiliodonta Temporal range: Caradoc 460.9–449.7 Ma

Scientific classification
- Domain: Eukaryota
- Kingdom: Animalia
- Phylum: Mollusca
- Class: Bivalvia
- Order: Nuculida
- Family: †Praenuculidae
- Subfamily: †Concavodontinae
- Genus: †Emiliodonta; Sánchez, 2010
- Species: †E. cuerdai

Binomial name
- †Emiliodonta cuerdai (Sánchez, 1999)

Synonyms
- Emiliania Sánchez, 1999

Extinct genus of bivalves

Emiliodonta is an extinct genus of bivalve in the extinct family Praenuculidae. The genus is one of three genera in the subfamily Concavodontinae. Emiliodonta is known solely from late Ordovician, Caradocian epoch, fossils found in South America. The genus contains a single accepted species, Emiliodonta cuerdai.

== Description ==
Emiliodonta cuerdai is a bivalve first described in 1999 by Teresa M. Sánchez from fossils from sediments of the late Middle Ordovician, Caradocian-aged Don Braulio Formation. The formation outcrops on the flank of Sierra de Villicum in the Argentina precordillera. Generally the shells of Emiliodonta cuerdai are rounded and distinctly inflated. The shells have an umbo positioned on the anterior edge of the shell prosogyratly, with the beak curving towards the anterior side. The shell hinges have a series of twelve to fourteen concavodont teeth along the posterior edge and a series of five larger concavodont teeth on the anterior edge. The two series meet at the umbo with a group of four to five orthomorphic teeth. Emiliodonta ranges in shell length from 4.0 to 6.7 millimetres (0.16 to 0.26 in) and has a height between 4.0 and 5.5 millimetres (0.16 and 0.22 in). As a member of Concavodontinae, the hinge displays the chevroning of teeth typical of the subfamily. The teeth have a concavity in the chevron, which faces away from the center of the hinge and the umbo.

When first described, the genus name Emiliania was chosen by Sánchez in reference to her father Emiliano Sánchez. However the genus name Emiliania is a homonym already used by W.W. Hay & H.P. Mohler in 1967 for a genus of coccolithophore. In a 2010 paper, Sánchez moved the species to the generic Emiliodonta name. The species epithet cuerdai was coined in honor of C. Cuerda, a professor at the Universidad de La Plata and friend of Teresa M. Sánchez.
