= Gliding ant =

Name used for several tree-dwelling ants

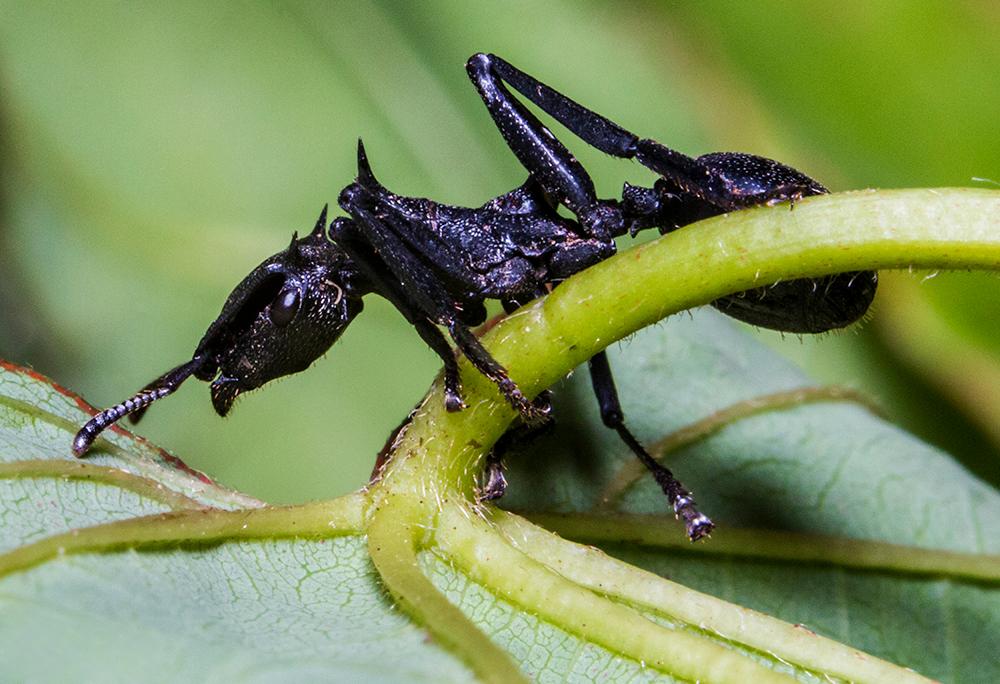
A Cephalotes atratus, one of the several species that display this ability. Gliding is provided by specific adaptations such as the flattened head.

Gliding ants are arboreal ants of several different genera that are able to control the direction of their descent when falling from a tree. Living in the rainforest canopy like many other gliders, gliding ants use their gliding to return to the trunk of the tree they live on should they fall or be knocked off a branch. Gliding was first discovered for Cephalotes atratus in the Peruvian rainforest.

At least five genera in the subfamilies Myrmicinae, Pseudomyrmecinae, and Formicinae (mostly Camponotus) display gliding of various degrees, in an example of parallel evolution. All species in the genus Cephalotes (within Myrmicinae) tested to date show this ability, as do many species within Pseudomyrmecinae. Unique among gliding animals, Cephalotes (Myrminae) and Pseudomyrmecinae ants glide abdomen first. Formicinae ants glide in the more conventional head first manner, though.

Gliding ants have been shown to have an 85% chance of landing successfully on the same tree, as opposed to 5% if they were simply parachuting like normal ants. This adaptation helps to keep ants from getting lost or killed on the forest floor, away from their treetop nests. During a fall, gliding ants use visual cues to locate tree trunks. Specifically, they orient to light-colored columnar objects that sharply contrast the darker background of foliage in the forest. Tropical trees often have light-coloured bark and frequently are covered with white lichens, thus they provide the most conspicuous targets.

In a typical fall a descent by a gliding ant is "J-shaped". The ant will first randomly descend 3 or 4 metres (10 or 13 ft) in free fall, then visually lock on to the tree trunk it wishes to land on. The glide ant then, while exhibiting a sort of parachuting behaviour to slow its fall, uses its flattened head, hind legs and abdomen like wings or a parachute to make a rapid adjustment to point its abdomen (or head) towards the tree trunk. The ant then turns upside down and lands on the trunk, head facing the earth. The period of free fall is thought to be used by the ants to slow down to a minimum viable glide velocity, to allow them to successfully direct their descent towards the tree. This explains why smaller ants have been observed to reach their trees sooner than do larger ants. A smaller body mass makes it easier to slow to the minimum viable glide velocity, allowing smaller ants to gain control of their falls more quickly. Many ants use long, flattened legs and wide, flanged heads to act as parachutes to control the direction of their descent, although controlled descent has also been observed in species of Pseudomyrmecinae that have more cylindrical bodies.

Gliding is not observed in all arboreal ants. Some characteristics that may be evolutionarily correlated with gliding are:

- Arboreal nesting
- Frequent foraging at branch tips
- Heavily armoured individuals
- Wide range of abdominal movement
- Good vision
- Diurnal activity
- Evolutionary origins in flooded forests

== See also ==
- Flying and gliding animals
