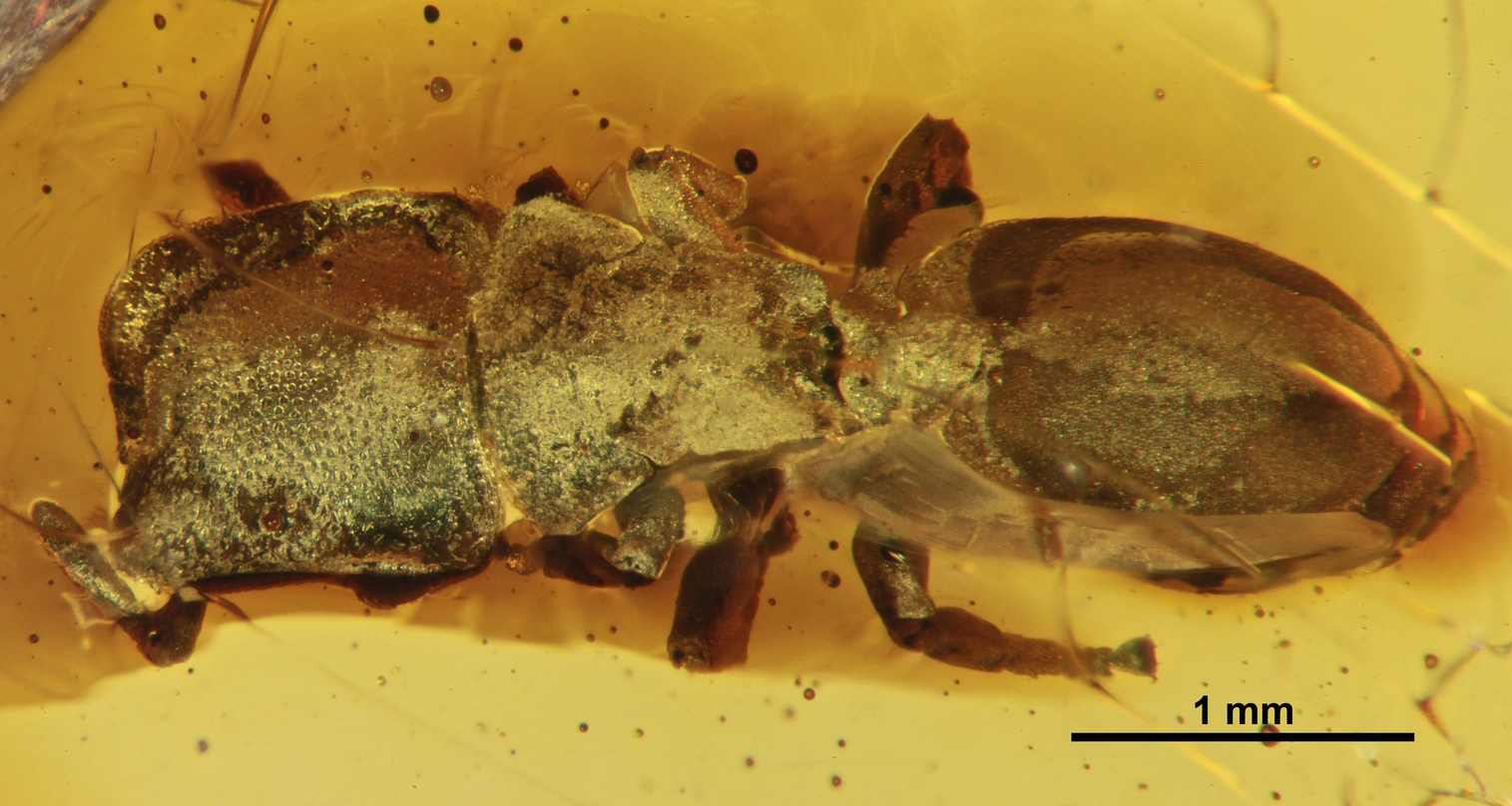
- Holotype

Scientific classification
- Kingdom: Animalia
- Phylum: Arthropoda
- Clade: Pancrustacea
- Class: Insecta
- Order: Hymenoptera
- Family: Formicidae
- Subfamily: Myrmicinae
- Genus: Cephalotes
- Species: †C. caribicus

Binomial name
- †Cephalotes caribicus De Andrade & Baroni Urbani, 1999

= Cephalotes caribicus =

Cephalotes caribicus Temporal range: Burdigalian

Extinct species of ant

Cephalotes caribicus is an extinct species of ant in the subfamily Myrmicinae known from two Middle Miocene fossils found in amber on Hispaniola. At the time of description C. caribicus was one of nine ant species placed in the Cephalotes pinelii clade.

== History and classification ==
Cephalotes caribicus was described based on two fossilised specimens which were preserved as inclusions in transparent chunks of Dominican amber. The amber was produced by the extinct Hymenaea protera, which formerly grew on Hispaniola, across northern South America and up to southern Mexico. The specimens were collected from an unidentified amber mine in the Dominican Republic. The amber dates from the Burdigalian stage of the Miocene being recovered from sections of the La Toca Formation in the Cordillera Septentrional and the Yanigua Formation in the Cordillera Oriental.

At the time of description, the holotype specimen was preserved in the collections of the State Museum of Natural History Stuttgart, while the paratype was part of the George O. Poinar amber collections at Oregon State University. Living and fossil Cephalotes, Eucryptocerus, Exocryptocerus and Zacryptocerus ants were examined in 1999 by Maria L. De Andrade and Cesare Baroni Urbani with a redescription of included species being published in the journal Stuttgarter Beiträge zur Naturkunde. Serie B (Geologie und Paläontologie). The two fossils were first described in the paper along with a number of fossils and were placed into the new species Cephalotes caribicus. De Andrade and Baroni Urbani coined the specific epithet caribicus as a reference to region where the species was found.

=== Phylogeny ===
In the study of Cephalotes by De Andrade and Baroni Urbani, C. caribicus was grouped into the pinelii clade, which is composed of C. caribicus and eight extant species. The clade shares two distinct morphological features between the species and two coloration patterns. The mesosoma of pinelii clade species is modified with expansions of membrane, not seen in related clades. Additionally the antennae have a terminal club formed from the last two antennae segments rather than the last three segments. In the living species the gaster of the workers have a pair of spots or stripes and four spots are present on the gasters of gynes. Due to a fine layer of gas over the surface of each of the C. caribicus worker fossils in amber, the coloration was not distinguishable by De Andrade and Baroni Urbani, but color patterns were. C. caribicus was consistently placed as a sister species Cephalotes incertus, both of which were nested deep in the clade.

- Cephalotes
  - C.grandinosus clade
  - C.pinelii clade
    - C. maculatus
    - - C. nilpiei
      - - C. pileini
        - - C. pinelii
          - - C. liepini
            - - C. kukulcan
              - - C. scutulatus
                - - †C. caribicus
                  - C. incertus

== Description ==
The two workers known have body lengths between 3.97–4.64 mm (0.156–0.183 in), and heads that range between 0.98–1.04 mm (0.039–0.041 in). Due to a thin film of gas over workers in both fossils, the coloration they may have had in life was not easily identifiable. The color patterning is visible and lighter colored spots on the head plus four lighter colored spots on the mesosoma are present, but the original coloration of the ants was not identifiable. The head is generally rectangular in outline, with broadly curved rear corners and having membranous extensions. The antennae have distinct apical clubs formed from the last two antenna segments. The first section of the mesosoma has large membrane extensions on the sides.

The semitransparent expansions across the body are interpreted by De Andrade and Baroni Urbani as mechanisms to protect the body and appendages such as the antennae and legs from attack by other ants or arthropods. C. caribicus shares the feature of expanded membranous rear head corners with the modern species Cephalotes scutulatus of Central America.
