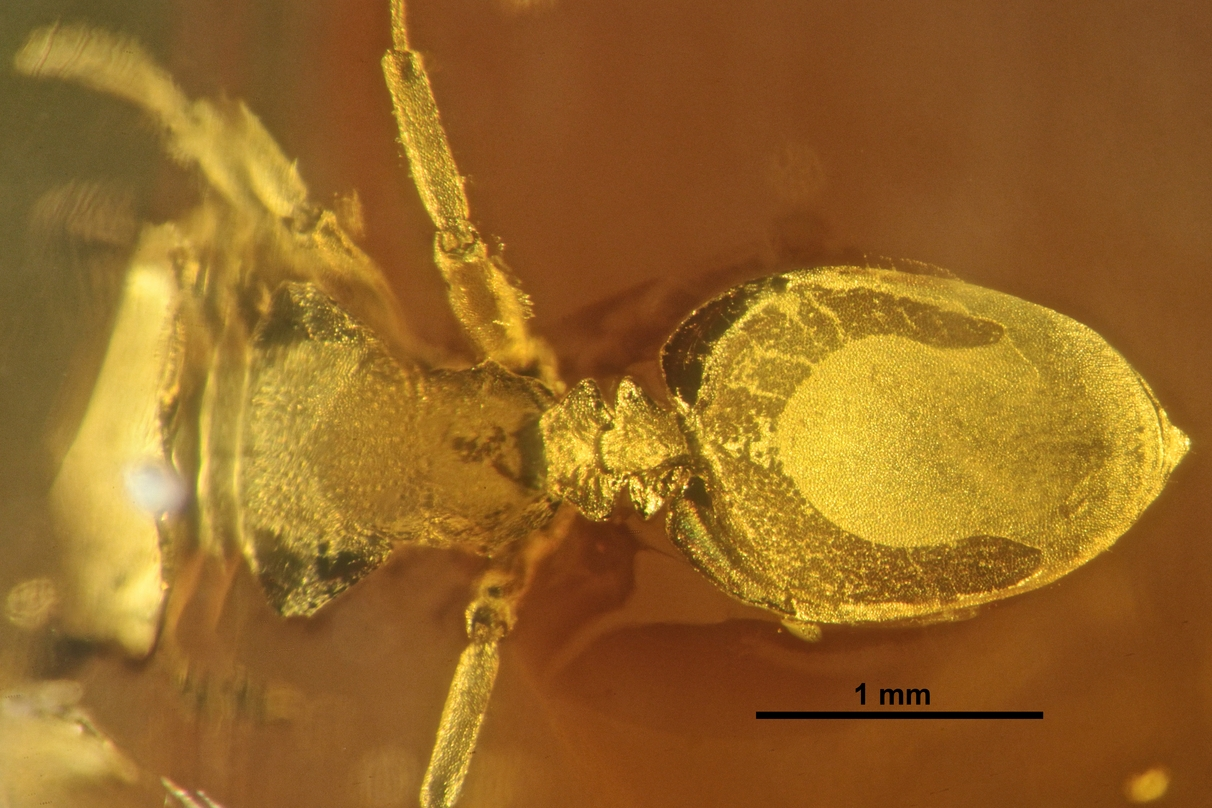
- Holotype

Scientific classification
- Kingdom: Animalia
- Phylum: Arthropoda
- Clade: Pancrustacea
- Class: Insecta
- Order: Hymenoptera
- Family: Formicidae
- Subfamily: Myrmicinae
- Genus: Cephalotes
- Species: †C. hispaniolicus

Binomial name
- †Cephalotes hispaniolicus De Andrade & Baroni Urbani, 1999

= Cephalotes hispaniolicus =

Cephalotes hispaniolicus Temporal range: Burdigalian

Extinct species of ant

Cephalotes hispaniolicus is an extinct species of ant in the subfamily Myrmicinae known from a single Middle Miocene fossil found in amber on Hispaniola. At the time of description C. hispaniolicus was one of six ant species placed in the Cephalotes multispinosus clade.

== History and classification ==
C. hispaniolicus was described from a solitary fossil worker caste ant which was preserved as an inclusion in a transparent chunk of Dominican amber. The amber was produced by the extinct tree Hymenaea protera, which formerly grew on Hispaniola, across northern South America and up to southern Mexico. The specimen was collected from an unidentified amber mine in the Dominican Republic. The amber dates from the Burdigalian age of the Miocene, being recovered from sections of the La Toca Formation in the Cordillera Septentrional and the Yanigua Formation in the Cordillera Oriental.

At the time of description, the holotype specimen was preserved in the collections of the State Museum of Natural History Stuttgart in Germany. Living and fossil Cephalotes, Eucryptocerus, Exocryptocerus and Zacryptocerus ants were examined in 1999 by Maria L. De Andrade and Cesare Baroni Urbani with a redescription of included species being published in the journal Stuttgarter Beiträge zur Naturkunde. Serie B (Geologie und Paläontologie). The fossil was first described in the paper along with a number of fossils and was placed into the new species Cephalotes hispaniolicus. De Andrade and Baroni Urbani coined the specific epithet hispaniolicus as a neologism referring to the island of origin for the amber and species, Hispaniola.

=== Phylogeny ===
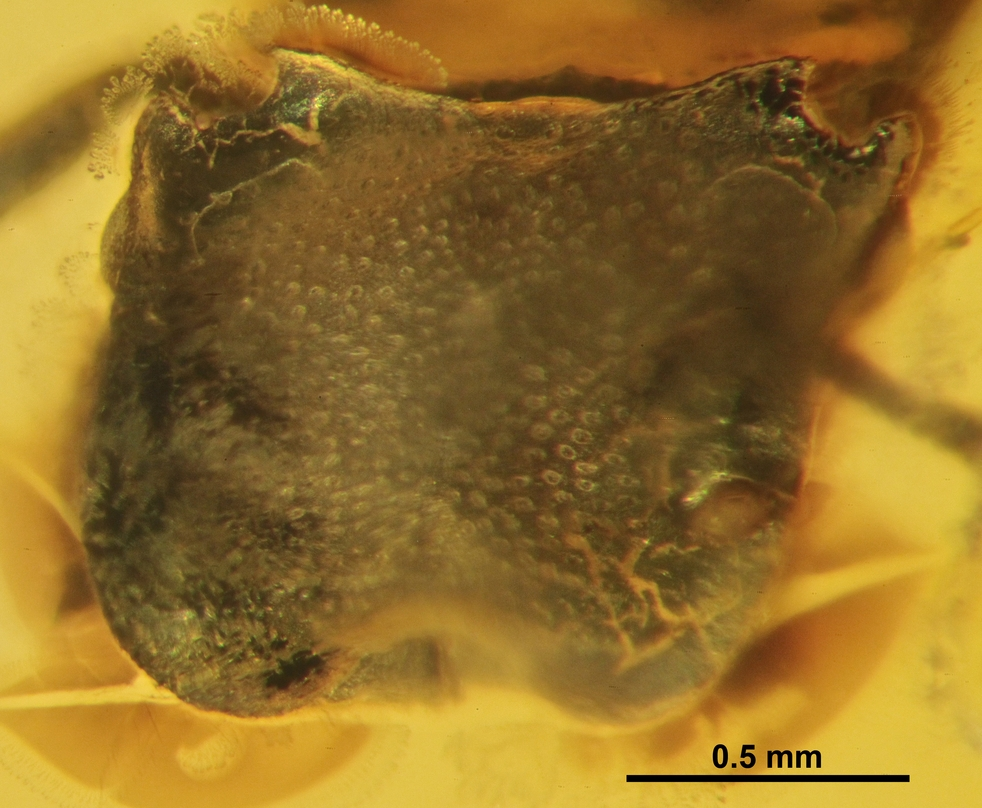
C. hispaniolicus head

In the study of Cephalotes by de Andrade and Baroni Urbani, C. hispaniolicus was grouped into the multispinosus clade which is composed of three extinct species and three extant species. The clade shares only one distinct feature between the species; unlike other clades, multispinosus species have reduced lamellar expansions on the sides of the propodeum. C. hispaniolicus is distinguished from the first outgroup member of the clade Cephalotes poinari based on the shape of the propodial lamellar projections, but is closer in relation to it than to the other Dominican amber species in the clade, Cephalotes squamosus. C. hispaniolicus has the second highest cephalic index in the clade; only C. poinari has a greater one.

- Cephalotes
  - C. depressus clade
  - C. multispinosus clade
    - †C. poinari
    - - †C. hispaniolicus
      - - †C. squamosus
        - - C. goniodontus
          - C. multispinosus
          - - C. biguttatus
  - - - C. clypeatus clade

== Description ==
The lone worker of C. hispaniolicus has a body length of 4.39 mm (0.173 in), a head length of 0.98 mm (0.039 in) and a cephalic index that is 142.8. The overall body color is black, with four lighter colored spots, two on the head and two on the mesosoma. The lamellae along the gaster, propodeum, and pronotum along with the ridges along the front of the face are all dark brown and semitransparent. The head has minute punctate, with clumped pits that grow smaller towards the front of the head. The mesosoma, propodium, legs and gaster have a reticulated sculpturing to the exoskeleton, with pits in the centers of the reticulations. Similarly the peduncular segments are reticulated with pits, though the reticulation is denser than on the propodium. The center of the first gastral sternite is distinctly shiny. Each of the pits has a thin hair growing from it and which lies flat along the exoskeleton, and similar hairs are present on the gaster. Variously sized clubbed hairs are scattered along the rear borders of both the gastral tergites and sternites, while similar, but minutely sized clubbed hairs are rarely found on the rear corners of the head. The propodium has narrow lamellae along the posterior sides that project out and then taper towards the rear. The petiole and post petiole segments each have triangular semi-transparent lamellae on the sides, with the post petiole lamellae bracketed by the lamellae projecting from the front of the gaster.
