= Sphaerodactylus dommeli =

Sphaerodactylus dommeli Temporal range: Miocene

Scientific classification
- Kingdom: Animalia
- Phylum: Chordata
- Class: Reptilia
- Order: Squamata
- Suborder: Gekkota
- Family: Sphaerodactylidae
- Genus: Sphaerodactylus
- Species: †S. dommeli

Binomial name
- †Sphaerodactylus dommeli Bohme 1984

Extinct species of lizard

Sphaerodactylus dommeli is an extinct species of gecko that inhabited the Dominican Republic during the Miocene epoch.

== Geological context ==
The holotype (ZFMK 66238) is a well-preserved specimen embedded in Dominican amber from La Toca mine, El Mamey Formation, which dates back to the Burdigalian/Langhian periods of the Miocene (20.44–13.82 million years ago).

=== Paleontological significance ===
Along S. ciguapa, it is part of the oldest known representatives of the genus Sphaerodactylus in the fossil record, and the specimen represents one of the best-preserved fossils of the infraorder Gekkota.
