= Trichobius corynorhini =

Scientific classification
- Domain: Eukaryota
- Kingdom: Animalia
- Phylum: Arthropoda
- Class: Insecta
- Order: Diptera
- Family: Streblidae
- Genus: Trichobius
- Species: T. corynorhini

Binomial name
- Trichobius corynorhini Cockerell, 1910

Synonyms
- Trichobius quadrisetosus Kessel, 1925

Species of fly

Trichobius corynorhini is a species of bat fly in the family Streblidae.
