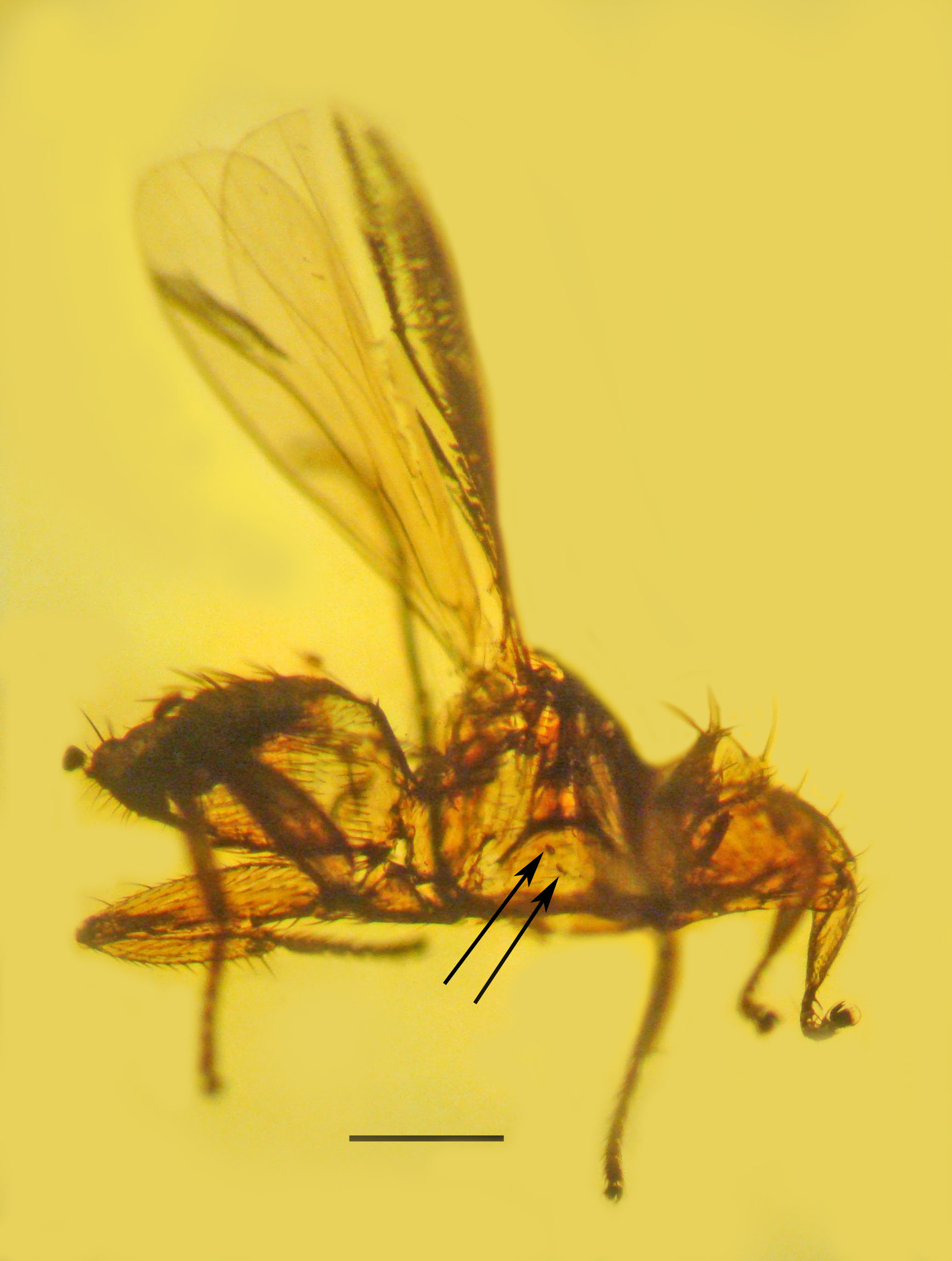
- Holotype male

Scientific classification
- Kingdom: Animalia
- Phylum: Arthropoda
- Class: Insecta
- Order: Diptera
- Family: Streblidae
- Genus: †Enischnomyia
- Species: †E. stegosoma

Binomial name
- †Enischnomyia stegosoma Poinar & Brown, 2012

= Enischnomyia =

Extinct genus of flies

Enischnomyia is an extinct genus of bat fly in the family Streblidae. At the time of its description the new genus comprised a single species, Enischnomyia stegosoma, known from a single Miocene fossil found on Hispaniola. E. stegosoma was the first fossil streblid bat fly described from a fossil, and the only member of the subfamily Nycterophiliinae described from Hispaniola. The species is host for the plasmodiid Vetufebrus ovatus preserved in its salivary glands and midgut.

== History and classification ==
Enischnomyia stegosoma was described based on a single fossilised specimen which is preserved as an inclusion in a transparent chunk of Dominican amber. The amber is fossil resin that was produced by the extinct Hymenaea protera, which formerly grew on Hispaniola, across northern South America and up to southern Mexico. The amber dates from the Burdigalian stage (20.43 ± 0.05 to 15.97 ± 0.05 million years ago) of the Miocene, and is recovered from sections of the La Toca Formation in the Cordillera Septentrional and the Yanigua Formation in the Cordillera Oriental. The specimen was collected from the LaBúcara amber mine in the Dominican Republic.

At the time of description, the holotype specimen, number "No. D-7-239", was preserved in the Poinar Amber collections, housed at Oregon State University, Corvallis. The holotype fossil was first studied by entomologist George Poinar Jr. of Oregon State University, and Alex Brown of Berkeley, California, with their 2012 type description of the new genus and species being published in the journal Systematic Parasitology. The genus name, Enischnomyia was derived from a combination of the Greek words myia meaning "fly" and enischnos meaning "thin" or "slight". The specific epithet stegosoma is coined from the Greek words stenos and soma meaning "narrow" and "body" respectively.

== Paleobiology and parasite vectoring ==
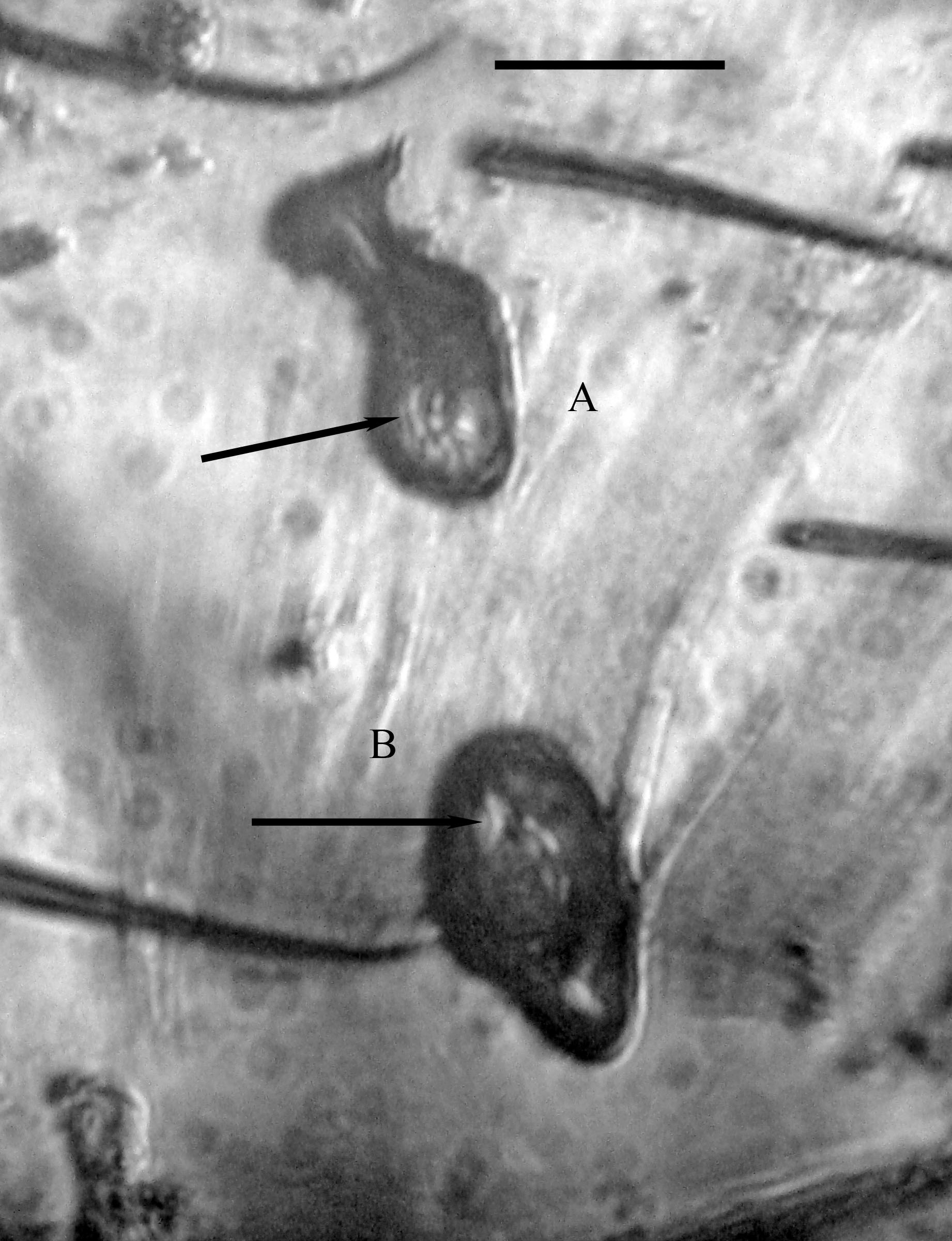
Vetufebrus ovatus oocysts in E. stegosoma midgut

The amber entombing E. stegosoma contains no preserved evidence of what its host animal may have been. However member species of Streblidae are bat parasites, with the Nycterophiliinae species being obligate external parasites that feed on the blood of bats, so it is suggested E. stegosoma was the same. At least two bat fur fossils had been described from Dominican amber prior to the description of E. stegosoma. A larval Nymphalidae brush-footed butterfly with a single hair stuck to a rear spine was described in 1998, with the hair noted to be similar to those of the bat genus Eptesicus. In 2005 additional bat hairs were reported in the amber specimen entombing the extinct kissing-bug Triatoma dominicana, itself a host to the extinct Trypanosoma antiquus.

Based on the flattened and rather flea like body plus inflated front femurs, simplified wing structure and location of origin, the genus was placed into the bat fly subfamily Nycterophiliinae. The flattened body and front legs were likely used to burrow into the bat's fur to reach skin for feeding, as is done by modern Nycterophilia coxata. Unlike the modern nycterophiliines, which lower their entire head to the skin to feed, E. stegosoma had an elongated 'labium which was most likely lowered to the skin instead. No members of the subfamily are native to Hispaniola, which is depauperate of bat-flies, having two genera, Strebla and Tricholobius and five total species.

Preserved in the mid gut and salivary ducts of E. stegosoma are oocysts and sporozoites of the plasmodiid Vetufebrus ovatus. The association was the first instance of a streblid bat fly acting as host and vector for a malarial parasite. Extant bat malaria causing plasmodiids are transmitted by species of the bat fly family Nycteribiidae, with no recorded association between living malaria plasmodiids and streblid bat flies.

== Description ==
The holotype male is 1.4 mm (0.055 in) with wings that are 1.2 millimetres (0.047 in) long by 450 micrometres (0.018 in) wide. The head on a prominent neck is partially covered by the expanded procoxae of the front most legs. There are no ocelli and the compound eyes at the antennae bases are reduced in size to only three facets. The antennae have two very modified segments, a pyramidal basal scape that is short and attached to the head. At the tip of the scape are both the flagellum, and the pedicel with ringed tube-like lower section and enlarged apex. On the pedicel apex are seven spine-like setae, four small ones and three elongated ones. The flagellum is placed below the pedicel and forms a plumose arista. The labium has two small setae on the underside of the fleshy, small labella along with five more setae on the terminal edge. The labrum has a tube shape and the basal theca is slightly enlarged.
