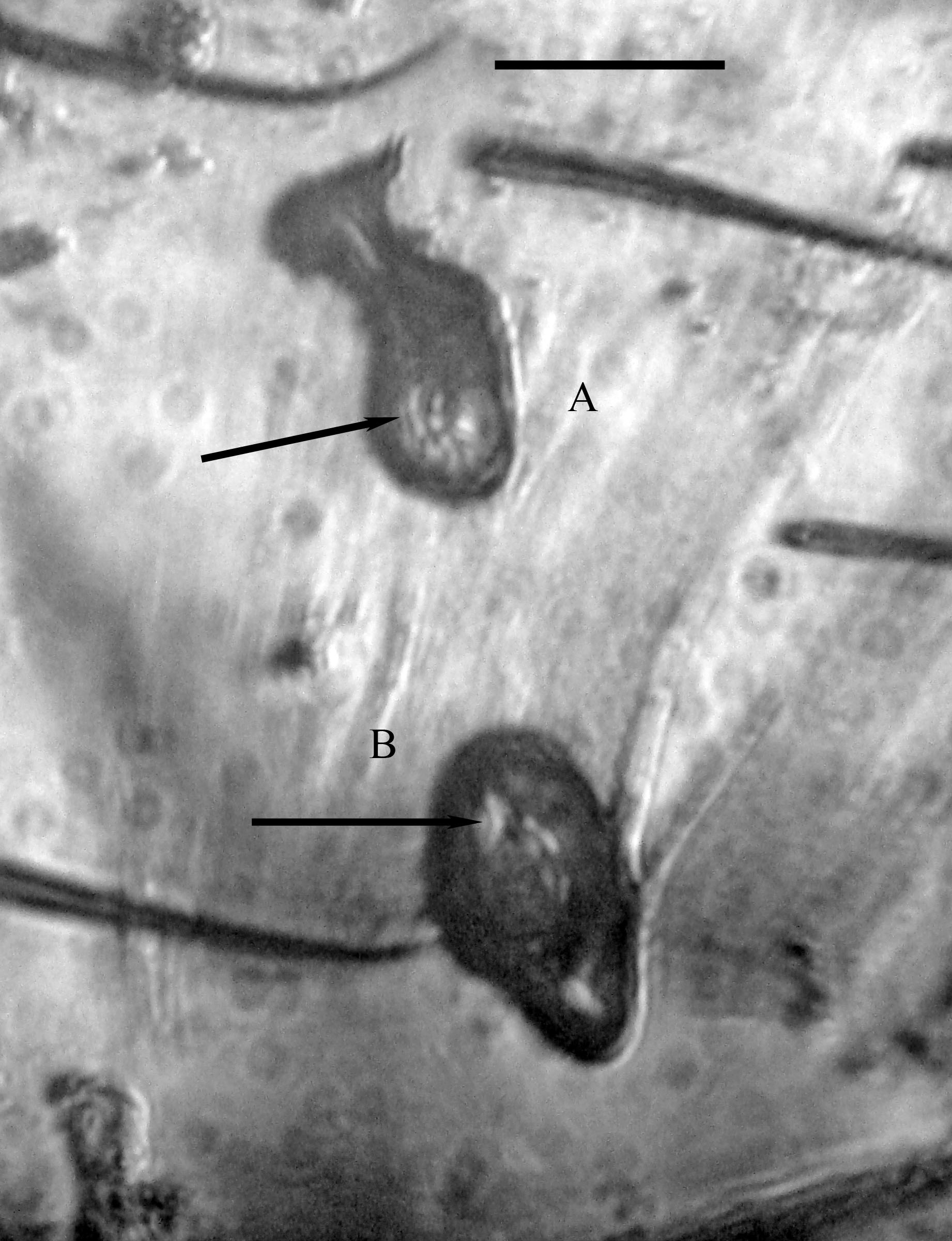
- Oocyts in Enischnomyia midgut

Scientific classification
- Domain: Eukaryota
- Clade: Sar
- Clade: Alveolata
- Phylum: Apicomplexa
- Class: Aconoidasida
- Order: Haemospororida
- Family: Plasmodiidae
- Genus: †Vetufebrus
- Species: †V. ovatus

Binomial name
- †Vetufebrus ovatus Poinar 2011

= Vetufebrus =

Vetufebrus Temporal range: Burdigalian

Extinct genus of single-celled organisms

Vetufebrus is an extinct genus of haemospororida in the family Plasmodiidae. At the time of its description the new genus comprised a single species Vetufebrus ovatus known from a single Miocene Dominican amber fossil found on Hispaniola. V. ovatus was vectored by Enischnomyia stegosoma, the first fossil streblid bat fly described from a fossil, and the only member of the subfamily Nycterophiliinae described from Hispaniola. V. ovatus is the first instance of a Streblidae bat fly as a host for a malarial parasite.

== History and classification ==
Vetufebrus ovatus was described based on a group of fossilized specimens which are preserved as in the host batfly, itself an inclusion in a transparent chunk of Dominican amber. The amber is fossil resin that was produced by the extinct Hymenaea protera, which formerly grew on Hispaniola, across northern South America and up to southern Mexico. The amber dates from the Burdigalian stage (20.43 ± 0.05 to 15.97 ± 0.05 million years ago) of the Miocene, and is recovered from sections of the La Toca Formation in the Cordillera Septentrional and the Yanigua Formation in the Cordillera Oriental. The amber specimen was collected from the LaBúcara amber mine in the Dominican Republic.

At the time of description, the holotype specimen, number "No. D-7-239", was preserved in the Poinar Amber collections, housed at Oregon State University, Corvallis, Oregon. The holotype fossil was first studied by entomologist George Poinar Jr. of Oregon State University with his 2011 type description of the new genus and species being published in the journal Parasites & Vectors. The genus name, Vetufebrus was derived from a combination of the Latin words vetus meaning "old" and febris meaning "fever". The specific epithet ovatus was coined from the Latin word ovatus meaning "ovate", an allusion to the shape of the oocysts.

== Paleobiology and parasite vectoring ==
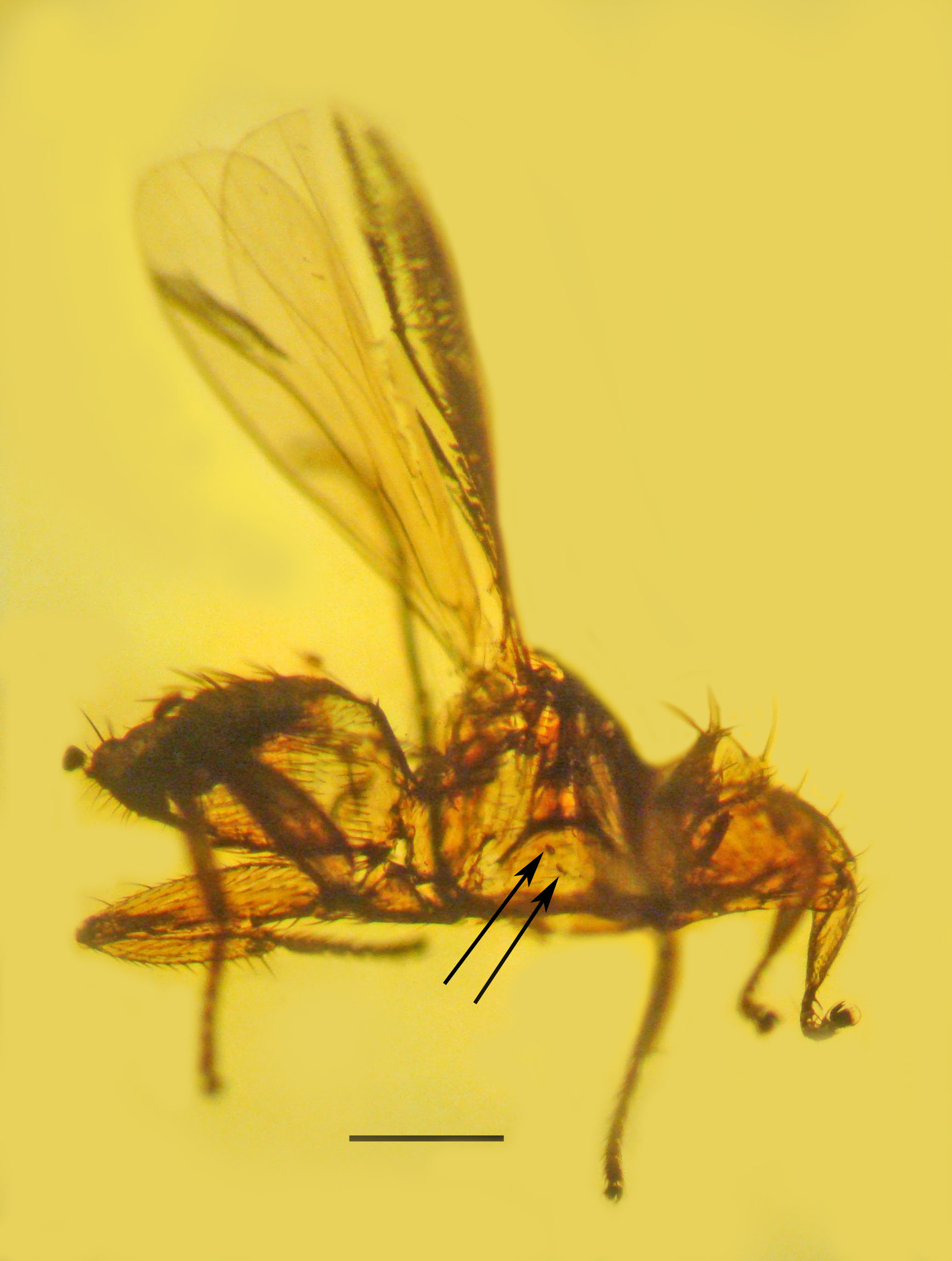
Male Enischnomyia stegosoma; arrows indicate oocysts

Extant bat malaria causing plasmodiids are transmitted by species of the bat fly family Nycteribiidae, with no recorded association between living malaria plasmodiids and streblid bat flies. Of the four genera of bat malaria Hepatocystis, Nycteria, Plasmodium, and Polychromophilus, the first three are confined to Old World bats, and only Polychromophilus is present in the New World. Vetufebrus ovatus oocysts are preserved in the mid gut of Enischnomyia stegosoma and sporozoites are present in the oocysts along with in the salivary ducts. The sporozoites preserved in the salivary glands and ducts are similar in size to those in the oocysts, which indicate that V. ovatus was successfully vectored to the flies host. The infection association was the first instance of a Streblidae family bat fly acting as host and vector for a malarial parasite. The oocysts of V. ovatus are smaller and ovoid in shape while mature Polychromophilus species oocysts are rounded and larger overall. Poinar notes that the oocysts in V. ovatus might have been immature, and the sporozoites in the salivary ducts could have been left from a prior infection. The overall sporozoite morphology is similar to those of Polychromophilus species, suggesting the possibility of Vetufebrus being an early lineage for Polychromophilus, though the oocysts are not consistent.

The amber entombing V. ovatus and E. stegosoma contains no preserved evidence of what its host animal may have been. However member species of Streblidae are bat parasites, with Nycterophiliinae subfamily species being obligate external parasites that feed on the blood of bats, so it is suggested E. stegosoma was the same. At least two bat fur fossils had been described from Dominican amber prior to the description of E. stegosoma. A larval Nymphalidae brush-footed butterfly with a single hair stuck to a rear spine was described in 1998, with the hair noted to be similar to those of the bat genus Eptesicus. In 2005 additional bat hairs were reported in the amber specimen entombing the extinct kissing-bug Triatoma dominicana, its-self a host to the extinct Trypanosoma antiquus.

== Description ==
Both the oocysts are a brown in coloration and are between 29–32 μm (0.001–0.001 in) long by 15–17 μm (0.001–0.001 in) wide. Both oocysts have a thin surrounding membrane, multiple dark colored cells with nuclei and a number of developing sporozoites. The sporozoites in the oocysts range between 7–10 μm (0.000–0.000 in), while the sporocytes in the salivary glands are slightly larger, 8–10 μm (0.000–0.000 in) and have a rounded stubby outline.
