= Yanigua Formation =

Geologic formation in the Dominican Republic

- Stratigraphic range: Miocene
- Type: Formation

Lithology
- Primary: Claystone, marl
- Other: Dominican amber

Location
- Coordinates: 18.8°N 69.7°W
- Approximate paleocoordinates: 18.7°N 68.6°W
- Country: Dominican Republic

Type section
- Named for: Yanigua mine
- Yanigua Formation (the Dominican Republic)

The Yanigua Formation is a geologic formation in Dominican Republic. The lagoonal claystones and marls preserve fossils dating back to the Miocene period. The formation hosts Dominican amber.

== Fossil content ==
- Aureofungus yaniguaensis, named after the formation
- Cephalotes alveolatus, C. caribicus, C. dieteri, C. hispaniolicus
- Enischnomyia stegosoma
- Mesembrinella caenozoica
- Vetufebrus ovatus
- ?Neocallichirus quisquellanus
- Portunus sp.
- Sebecidae Indet.

== See also ==
- List of fossiliferous stratigraphic units in the Dominican Republic
  - La Toca Formation
  - El Mamey Formation
- Lagunitas Formation, Cuba
