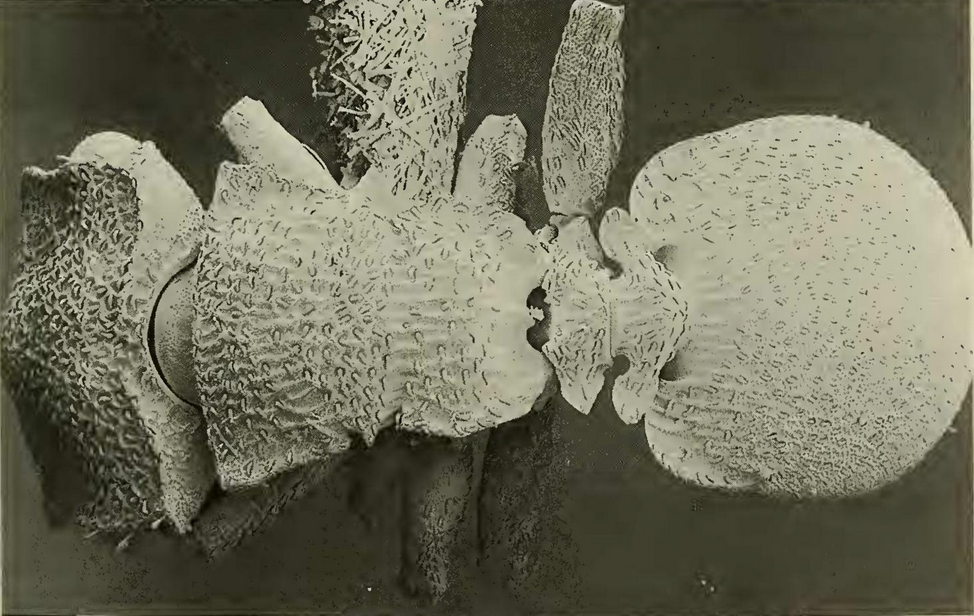

Scientific classification
- Domain: Eukaryota
- Kingdom: Animalia
- Phylum: Arthropoda
- Class: Insecta
- Order: Hymenoptera
- Family: Formicidae
- Subfamily: Myrmicinae
- Genus: Cephalotes
- Species: C. liepini

Binomial name
- Cephalotes liepini De Andrade, 1999

= Cephalotes liepini =

Species of ant

Cephalotes liepini is a species of arboreal ant of the genus Cephalotes, characterized by an odd shaped head and the ability to "parachute" by steering their fall if they drop off of the tree they're on. Giving their name also as gliding ants. The species is native of the Brazilian states of Goiás and Minas Gerais. Their larger and flatter legs, a trait common with other members of the genus Cephalotes, gives them their gliding abilities.

The species was first given a description and a classification in 1999 by Brazilian entomologist Maria de Andrade, after a specimen was found in Alvorada do Norte in the state of Goiás.

The species shares a number of physical traits with Cephalotes kukulcan, and the name liepini is an anagram of pinelii, as according to De Andrade, Cephalotes pinelii is a close relative to Cephalotes liepini.
