= Trichobius =

Scientific classification
- Domain: Eukaryota
- Kingdom: Animalia
- Phylum: Arthropoda
- Class: Insecta
- Order: Diptera
- Family: Streblidae
- Genus: Trichobius; Gervais, 1844

Genus of flies

Trichobius is a genus of bat flies in the family Streblidae. There are more than 60 described species in Trichobius.

== Species ==
These 69 species belong to the genus Trichobius:

- Trichobius adamsi Augustson, 1943
- Trichobius affinis Wenzel, 1976
- Trichobius anducei Guerrero, 1998
- Trichobius angulatus Wenzel, 1976
- Trichobius assimilis Wenzel, 1976
- Trichobius bequaerti Wenzel, 1966
- Trichobius bilobus Wenzel, 1976
- Trichobius brennani Wenzel, 1966
- Trichobius caecus Edwards, 1918
- Trichobius cernyi Peterson & Hurka, 1974
- Trichobius cognatus Peterson & Hurka, 1974
- Trichobius corynorhini Cockerell, 1910
- Trichobius costalimai Guimaraes, 1938
- Trichobius diaemi Wenzel, 1976
- Trichobius diphyllae Wenzel, 1966
- Trichobius dominicanus Peterson & Hurka, 1974
- Trichobius dugesii Townsend, 1891
- Trichobius dugesiodes Wenzel, 1966
- Trichobius dunni Wenzel, 1966
- Trichobius dusbabeki Peterson & Hurka, 1974
- Trichobius dybasi Wenzel, 1966
- Trichobius ethophallus Wenzel, 1976
- Trichobius flagellatus Wenzel, 1976
- Trichobius frequens Peterson & Hurka, 1974
- Trichobius furmani Wenzel, 1966
- Trichobius galei Wenzel, 1966
- Trichobius handleyi Wenzel, 1976
- Trichobius hirsutulus Bequaert, 1933
- Trichobius hispidus Wenzel, 1976
- Trichobius hoffmannae Guerrero & Morales-Malacara, 1996
- Trichobius imitator Wenzel, 1976
- Trichobius intermedius Peterson & Hurka, 1974
- Trichobius joblingi Wenzel, 1966
- Trichobius johnsonae Wenzel, 1966
- Trichobius jubatus Wenzel, 1976
- Trichobius keenani Wenzel, 1966
- Trichobius leionotus Wenzel, 1976
- Trichobius lionycteridis Wenzel, 1966
- Trichobius lonchophyllae Wenzel, 1966
- Trichobius longipes (Rudow, 1871)
- Trichobius longipilus Wenzel, 1976
- Trichobius machadoallisoni Guerrero, 1998
- Trichobius macrophylli Wenzel, 1966
- Trichobius macroti Peterson & Hurka, 1974
- Trichobius major Coquillett, 1899
- Trichobius mendezi Wenzel, 1966
- Trichobius neotropicus Peterson & Hurka, 1974
- Trichobius pallidus (Curran, 1934)
- Trichobius parasiticus Gervais, 1844
- Trichobius parasparsus Wenzel, 1976
- Trichobius persimilis Wenzel, 1976
- Trichobius petersoni Wenzel, 1976
- Trichobius phyllostomae Kessel, 1925
- Trichobius phyllostomus Guerrero, 1998
- Trichobius propinquus Wenzel, 1976
- Trichobius pseudotruncatus Jobling, 1939
- Trichobius robynae Peterson & Hurka, 1974
- Trichobius silvicolae Wenzel, 1976
- Trichobius sparsus Kessel, 1925
- Trichobius sphaeronotus Jobling, 1939
- Trichobius strictisternus Wenzel, 1976
- Trichobius tiptoni Wenzel, 1976
- Trichobius truncatus Kessel, 1925
- Trichobius tuttlei Wenzel, 1976
- Trichobius uniformis Curran, 1935
- Trichobius urodermae Wenzel, 1966
- Trichobius vampyropis Wenzel, 1966
- Trichobius wenzeli Peterson & Hurka, 1974
- Trichobius yunkeri Wenzel, 1966
