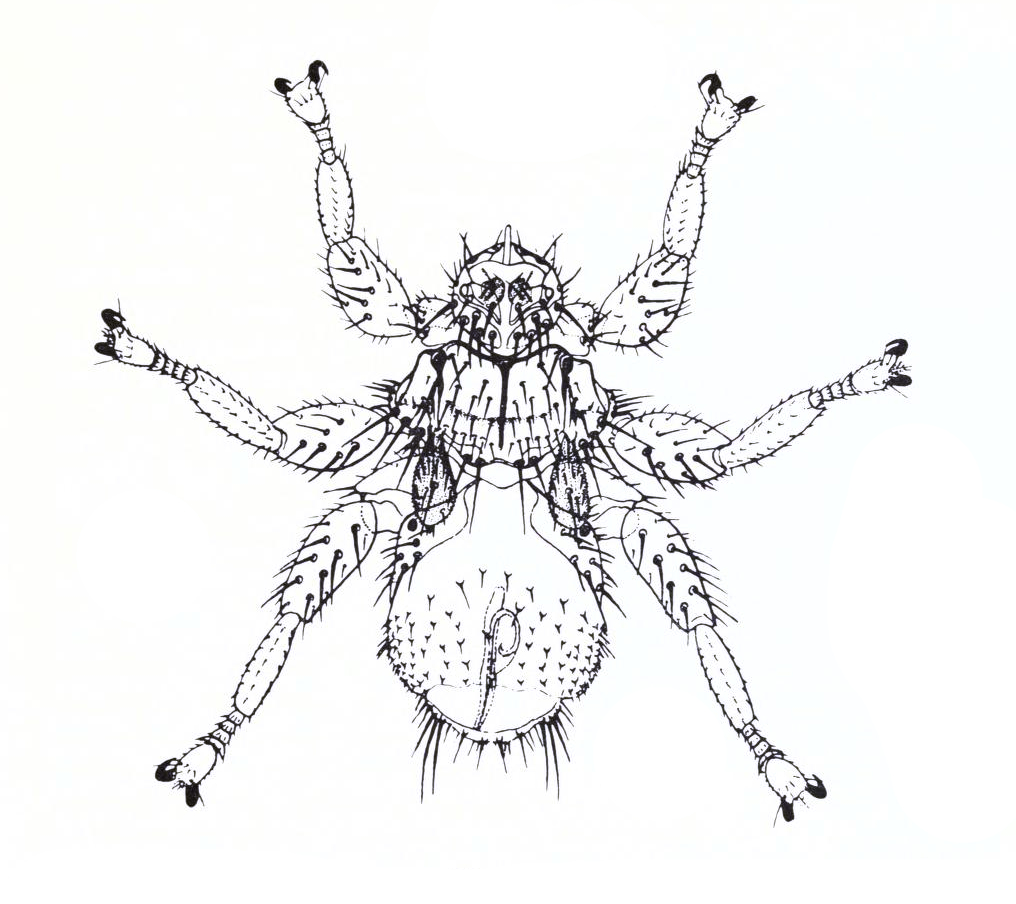
- Image of Mastoptera guimaraesi

Scientific classification
- Kingdom: Animalia
- Phylum: Arthropoda
- Class: Insecta
- Order: Diptera
- Family: Streblidae
- Genus: Mastoptera; Wenzel, 1966

= Mastoptera =

Genus of flies

Mastoptera is a genus of parasitic bat flies in the family Streblidae, a group of highly specialized ectoparasites that exclusively parasitize bats. Members of this genus have evolved to maintain a close relationship with their bat hosts, feeding on their blood and depending on them for survival.

== Biology ==
Mastoptera are small ectoparasites ranging in size from 0.73 to 1.29 mm (0.029 to 0.051 in). They are smallest species among the Strebilidae. Females are typically longer than males.

== Host and mechanism ==
This genus exhibits a high degree of host specificity, relying exclusively on bats as their definitive hosts. They attach to the bat's fur or wing membranes to feed on blood. They typically remain on a single host throughout their life cycle, maintaining attachment into adulthood. Mastoptera species are known to parasitize tropical bat species.

== Species ==
The genus Mastoptera currently consists of two confirmed species:

- Mastoptera guimaraesi Wenzel, 1966
- Mastoptera minuta Wenzel, 1966
