= El Mamey Formation =

Geologic formation in the Dominican Republic

- Stratigraphic range: Burdigalian-Langhian
- Type: Formation

Lithology
- Primary: Shale, sandstone, conglomerate
- Other: Dominican amber

Location
- Coordinates: 19.5°N 70.7°W
- Approximate paleocoordinates: 19.3°N 69.5°W
- Country: Dominican Republic
- El Mamey Formation (the Dominican Republic)

The El Mamey Formation is a geologic formation in the Dominican Republic. The formation consists of shales and sandstones interspersed with a conglomerate of well-rounded pebbles, deposited in a fluvio-deltaic environment. El Mamey Formation is one of the formations containing Dominican amber and preserves fossils dating back to the Burdigalian to Langhian period.

== Fossil content ==
- Palaeoraphe dominicana
- Roystonea palaea
- Sphaerodactylus ciguapa, S. dommeli
- Trithrinax dominicana
- Eleutherodactylus sp.
- Chilopoda indet.
- Diptera indet.

== See also ==
- List of fossiliferous stratigraphic units in the Dominican Republic
- La Toca Formation
- Baitoa Formation
- Cercado Formation
