= Brachytarsina =

Scientific classification
- Kingdom: Animalia
- Phylum: Arthropoda
- Clade: Pancrustacea
- Class: Insecta
- Order: Diptera
- Family: Streblidae
- Genus: Brachytarsina; Macquart, 1851

Synonyms
- Nycteribosca Speiser, 1899

Genus of flies

Brachytarsina is a genus of flies belonging to the family Streblidae.

The species of this genus are found in Africa, Malesia and Australia.

== Species ==
Species:

- Brachytarsina adversa Maa & Marshall, 1981
- Brachytarsina africana (Walker, 1849)
- Brachytarsina alluaudi (Falcoz, 1923)
- Brachytarsina amboinensis
- Brachytarsina asellisci
- Brachytarsina buxtoni
- Brachytarsina carolinae
- Brachytarsina cucullata
- Brachytarsina diversa
- Brachytarsina ethiopica
- Brachytarsina flavipennis
- Brachytarsina falcozi
- Brachytarsina franclemonti
- Brachytarsina longiarista
- Brachytarsina macrops
- Brachytarsina minuta
- Brachytarsina rouxi
- Brachytarsina scutellaris
- Brachytarsina surcoufi
- Brachytarsina verecunda
- Brachytarsina werneri
