= Güines Formation =

Geologic formation in Cuba

- Stratigraphic range: Early-Mid Miocene
- Type: Formation
- Overlies: Lagunitas Formation

Lithology
- Primary: Limestone

Location
- Coordinates: 22.9°N 81.7°W
- Approximate paleocoordinates: 23.1°N 78.9°W
- Region: Matanzas Province
- Country: Cuba

Type section
- Named for: Güines
- Güines Formation (Cuba)

The Güines Formation is a geologic formation in Cuba. It preserves fossils dating back to the Early to Middle Miocene period. Among others, fossils of the prehistoric dugong, Metaxytherium were found in the formation.

== Fossil content ==
- Aturia cubaensis
- Metaxytherium riveroi

== See also ==
- List of fossiliferous stratigraphic units in Cuba
