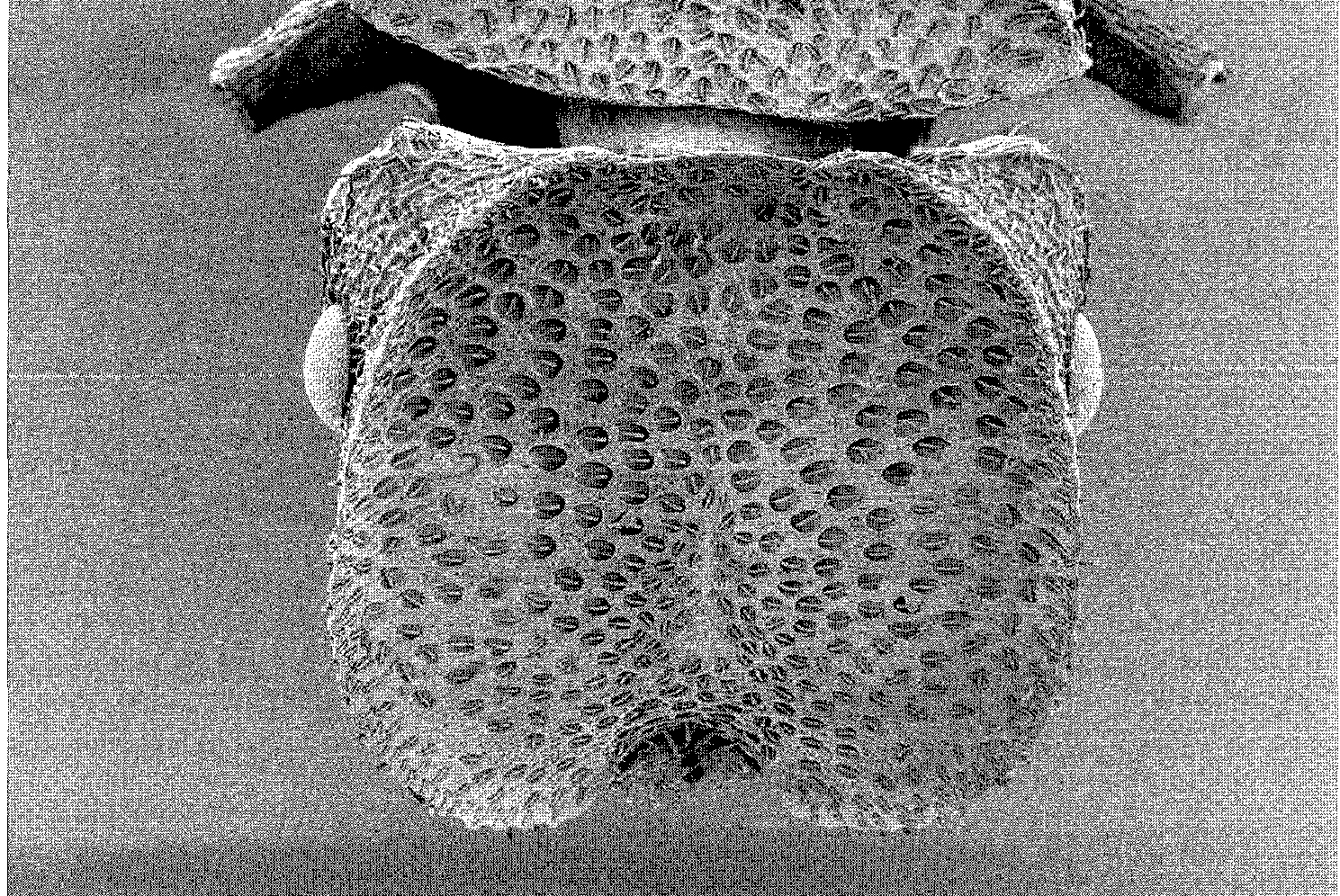

Scientific classification
- Domain: Eukaryota
- Kingdom: Animalia
- Phylum: Arthropoda
- Class: Insecta
- Order: Hymenoptera
- Family: Formicidae
- Subfamily: Myrmicinae
- Genus: Cephalotes
- Species: C. nilpiei

Binomial name
- Cephalotes nilpiei De Andrade, 1999

= Cephalotes nilpiei =

Species of ant

Cephalotes nilpiei is a species of arboreal ant of the genus Cephalotes, characterized by an odd shaped head and the ability to "parachute" by steering their fall if they drop off of the tree they're on. They're also known as gliding ants. The species is native of the Brazilian states of Minas Gerais and Rio de Janeiro. Their larger and flatter legs, a trait common with other members of the genus Cephalotes, gives them their gliding abilities and eases their arboreal movement.

The species was first given a description and a classification in 1845 by French entomologist Félix Édouard Guérin-Méneville. Guérin-Méneville erroneously classed the specimen he described as a member of the species Cephalotes pinelii. Brazilian entomologist Maria de Andrade studied the species once again in 1999 and gave it the name nilpiei, an anagram of pinelii. The closest relative of nilpiei is Cephalotes pinelii.
