= Strebla =

Scientific classification
- Kingdom: Animalia
- Phylum: Arthropoda
- Clade: Pancrustacea
- Class: Insecta
- Order: Diptera
- Family: Streblidae
- Genus: Strebla; Wiedemann, 1824

Genus of fly

Strebla is a genus of fly that sucks the blood out of host specific bats. Even though the genus Strebla is not very well researched there are a handful of species under this genus.

== Description ==
Strebla it is known as an ectoparasite meaning that this parasite lives on the external parts of the host. It is also monoxenous, which means it lives its whole life with only one host. This would make sense for the genus Strebla to also be hematophagous meaning that this genus feeds off of blood. As of now there is no evidence if the Strebla fly is harming the host or not.

== Diet ==
When it comes to the host that the parasite lives off of; it is very host specific to certain species of bats. The genus Strebla is found only on bats that are manly found the tropics of North America. From males and females of the genus most of their adult life is spent on the wings or fur of the bat. Due to different species of bats roosting in the same cave it is suggested that this could be the reason for host specificity. There is no research done on specifics as to life cycle and any further details when it comes to this genus. There is a diverse genus worldwide but even more so in the tropics, however not mush research has been done as to connections with the host and the environments. Based on studies it is shown that dry or rainy periods in Brazil tend to not have an effect on the number of Strebla flys.

== Research and status ==
Little research has been done on this genus and the species within the Strebla genus. Some species of bats are on the verge of extinction, which could result in the extinction certain species in the genus of Strebla since only certain species living on certain bats. There is no evidence showing if there would be an effect with this genus going extinct but it could lead to other more dangerous parasites harming bats which in turn could harm humans.

== Species ==
- Strebla altmani
- Strebla alvarezi
- Strebla asternalis
- Strebla carvalhoi
- Strebla christinae
- Strebla chrotopteri
- Strebla consocius
- Strebla cormurae
- Strebla curvata
- Strebla diaemi
- Strebla diphyllae
- Strebla galindoi
- Strebla guajiro
- Strebla guarani
- Strebla hardeni
- Strebla hertigi
- Strebla hoogstraali
- Strebla kohlsi
- Strebla machadoi
- Strebla matsoni
- Strebla mirabilis
- Strebla obtusa
- Strebla paramirabilis
- Strebla proxima
- Strebla tonatiae
- Strebla tupi
- Strebla wiedemanni
