= Cephalotes biguttatus =

Scientific classification
- Domain: Eukaryota
- Kingdom: Animalia
- Phylum: Arthropoda
- Class: Insecta
- Order: Hymenoptera
- Family: Formicidae
- Subfamily: Myrmicinae
- Genus: Cephalotes
- Species: C. biguttatus

Binomial name
- Cephalotes biguttatus (Emery, 1890)

Species of ant

Cephalotes biguttatus is a species of arboreal ant of the genus Cephalotes. They are characterized by an odd-shaped head and the ability to "parachute" by steering their fall after dropping off a tree, and thus are also called gliding ants. The species is a member of the multispinosus clade that differs from its outgroup species by the presence of gastral spots, from the two ingroups by the superficial sculpture of the worker and soldier, and, from the soldier specifically, by the absence of cephalic disc.
