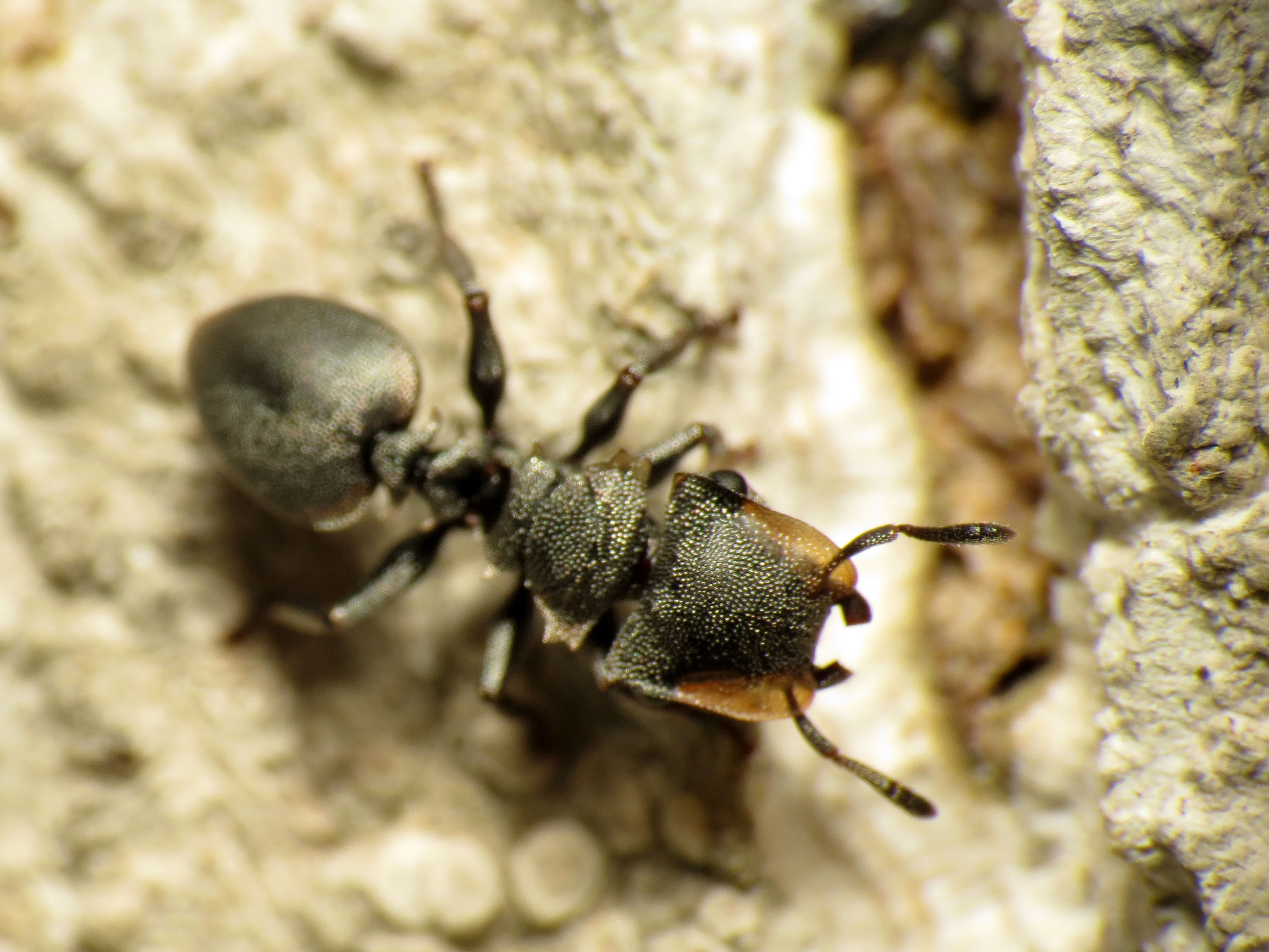

Scientific classification
- Domain: Eukaryota
- Kingdom: Animalia
- Phylum: Arthropoda
- Class: Insecta
- Order: Hymenoptera
- Family: Formicidae
- Subfamily: Myrmicinae
- Genus: Cephalotes
- Species: C. multispinosus

Binomial name
- Cephalotes multispinosus (Norton, 1868)

= Cephalotes multispinosus =

Species of ant

Cephalotes multispinosus is a species of arboreal ant of the genus Cephalotes, characterized by an odd shaped head and the ability to "parachute" by steering their fall if they drop off of the tree they're on. Giving their name also as gliding ants. The species is native of most of Central America, from the Mexican state of Nayarit in the north to Panama in the south. Dubious reports have also been made of the presence of the species in the American states of Texas and Illinois Their larger and flatter legs, a trait common with other members of the genus Cephalotes, gives them their gliding abilities.

The species was first given a description and a classification in 1868 by an entomologist named Norton.
