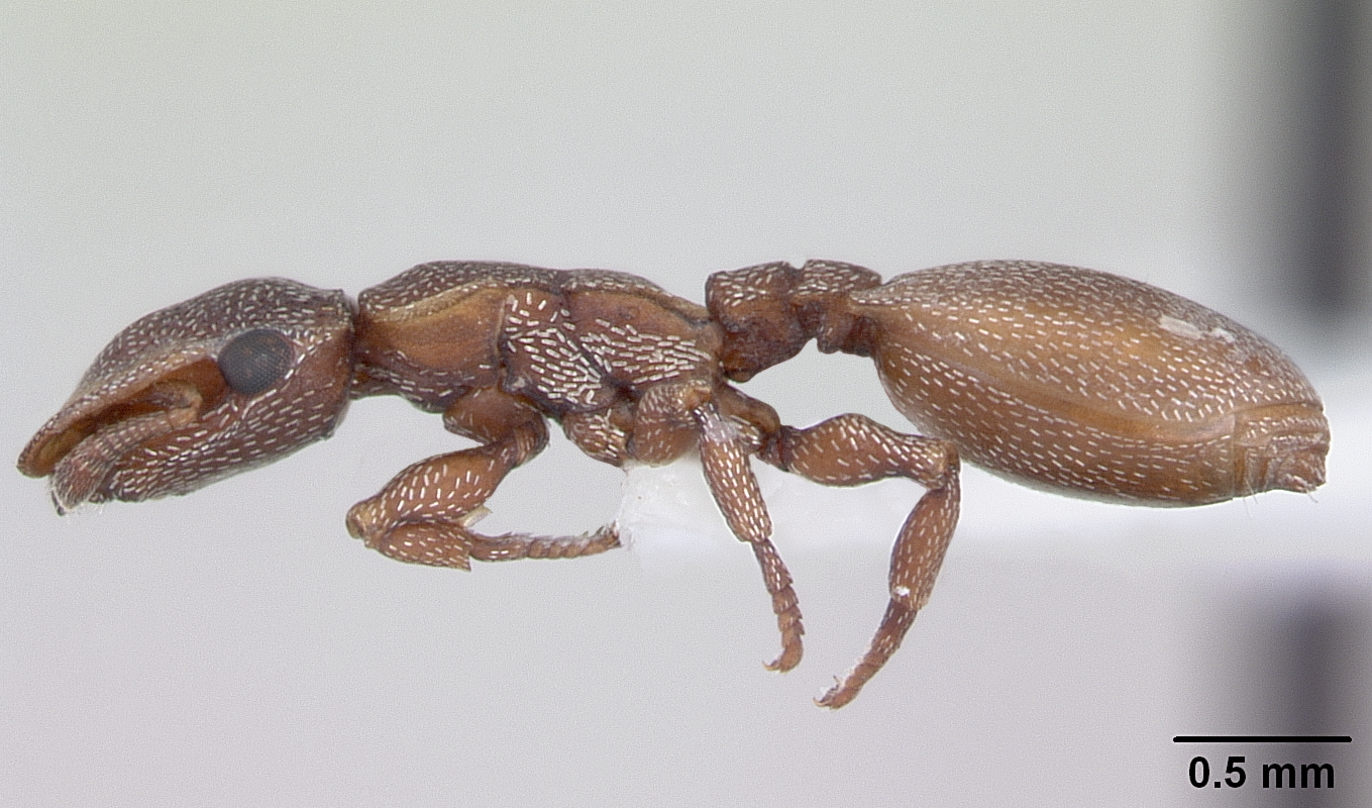
- Cephalotes incertus worker

Scientific classification
- Kingdom: Animalia
- Phylum: Arthropoda
- Class: Insecta
- Order: Hymenoptera
- Family: Formicidae
- Subfamily: Myrmicinae
- Genus: Cephalotes
- Species: C. incertus

Binomial name
- Cephalotes incertus (Emery, 1906)

= Cephalotes incertus =

Species of ant

Cephalotes incertus is a species of arboreal ant of the genus Cephalotes, characterized by an odd shaped head and the ability to "parachute" by steering their fall if they drop off of the tree they're on. Giving their name also as gliding ants.

Like other Cephalotes ants, C. incertus spends most of its life in the forest canopy and seldom descends to the forest floor. Studies of canopy ants show that members of this genus use directed aerial descent to glide back toward trees when they fall from their arboreal habitat.
