= Lagunitas Formation, Cuba =

Geologic formation in Cuba

Lagunitas Formation
- Stratigraphic range: Burdigalian (Hemingfordian)
- Type: Formation
- Underlies: Güines Formation
- Overlies: Las Cuevas Formation

Lithology
- Primary: Claystone, limestone
- Other: Conglomerate

Location
- Coordinates: 21.6°N 79.5°W
- Approximate paleocoordinates: 21.9°N 75.7°W
- Region: Sancti Spíritus Province
- Country: Cuba

Type section
- Named by: Popov
- Lagunitas Formation, Cuba (Cuba)

The Lagunitas Formation is a geologic formation in Cuba. The open marine, fluvio-deltaic and lagoonal claystones, limestones and conglomerates preserve fossils dating back to the Early Miocene period. Among others, the fossil primate Paralouatta marianae, the largest primate of the Miocene New World, was found in the formation. Based on microfossils, the age has been determined as Burdigalian.

== Description ==
The type locality designated by Popov is a small outcrop located 1.2 to 3.0 kilometres (0.75 to 1.86 mi) east of Trinidad, on the highway linking Trinidad and Banao. The youngest lithostratigraphic unit overlain by Lagunitas is the Oligocene Las Cuevas Formation in the type section. Lagunitas is in turn overlain by the Middle Miocene Güines Formation and younger sediments.

=== Regional correlation ===
Partial temporal and lithological equivalents of the Lagunitas Formation situated elsewhere in Cuba include the Arabos, Paso Real, Rosario and Magantilla Formations. In Hispaniola, the formation can be roughly correlated in age and lithology with the Maissade and Yanigua Formations. In Puerto Rico the most similar unit is the Cibao Formation.

== Vertebrate fossil content ==
- Hemipristis serra
- Imagocnus zazae
- Negaprion brevirostris
- Paralouatta marianae
- Sphyrna mokarran
- Zazamys veronicae
- Metaxytherium sp.
- Myliobatis sp.
- Odontoceti indet.
- Pelomedusoides indet.

== See also ==
- List of fossiliferous stratigraphic units in Cuba
