= Polyvena =

Scientific classification
- Domain: Eukaryota
- Kingdom: Animalia
- Phylum: Arthropoda
- Class: Insecta
- Order: Lepidoptera
- Family: Tortricidae
- Genus: †Polyvena; Poinar & Brown, 1993
- Species: †P. horatius

Binomial name
- †Polyvena horatius Poinar & Brown, 1993

Extinct genus of moths

Polyvena is an extinct genus of moths belonging to the family Tortricidae. It contains only one species (Polyvena horatius) which was described from Dominican amber.

== See also ==
- List of Tortricidae genera
