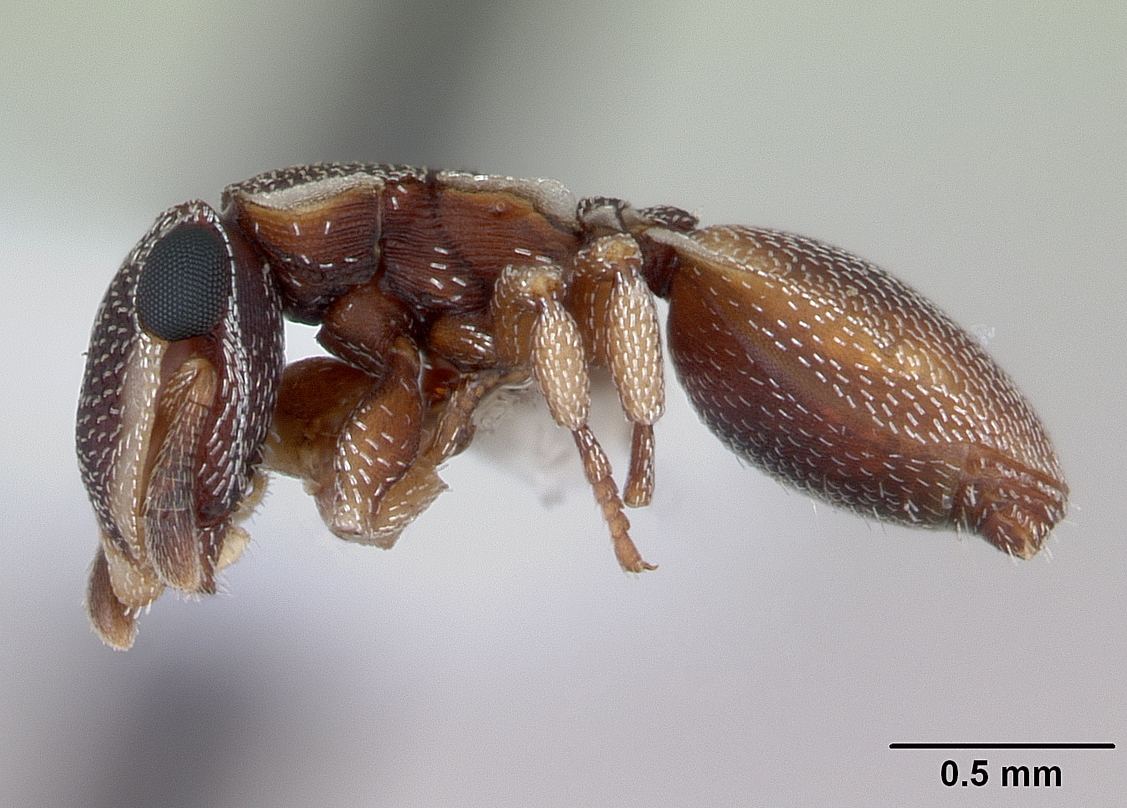

Scientific classification
- Domain: Eukaryota
- Kingdom: Animalia
- Phylum: Arthropoda
- Class: Insecta
- Order: Hymenoptera
- Family: Formicidae
- Subfamily: Myrmicinae
- Genus: Cephalotes
- Species: C. maculatus

Binomial name
- Cephalotes maculatus (Smith, 1876)

= Cephalotes maculatus =

Species of ant

Cephalotes maculatus is a species of arboreal ant of the genus Cephalotes, characterized by an odd shaped head and the ability to "parachute" by steering their fall if they drop off of the tree they're on. Giving their name also as gliding ants. The species is native across most of the South and Central America, from the Mexican state of Tamaulipas in the north, to the Argentinian province of Tucumán in the south, making it one of the species with the largest native area in the genus Cephalotes Their larger and flatter legs, a trait common with other members of the genus Cephalotes, gives them their gliding abilities.

The species was first given a description and a classification in 1876 by British entomologist Frederick Smith.
