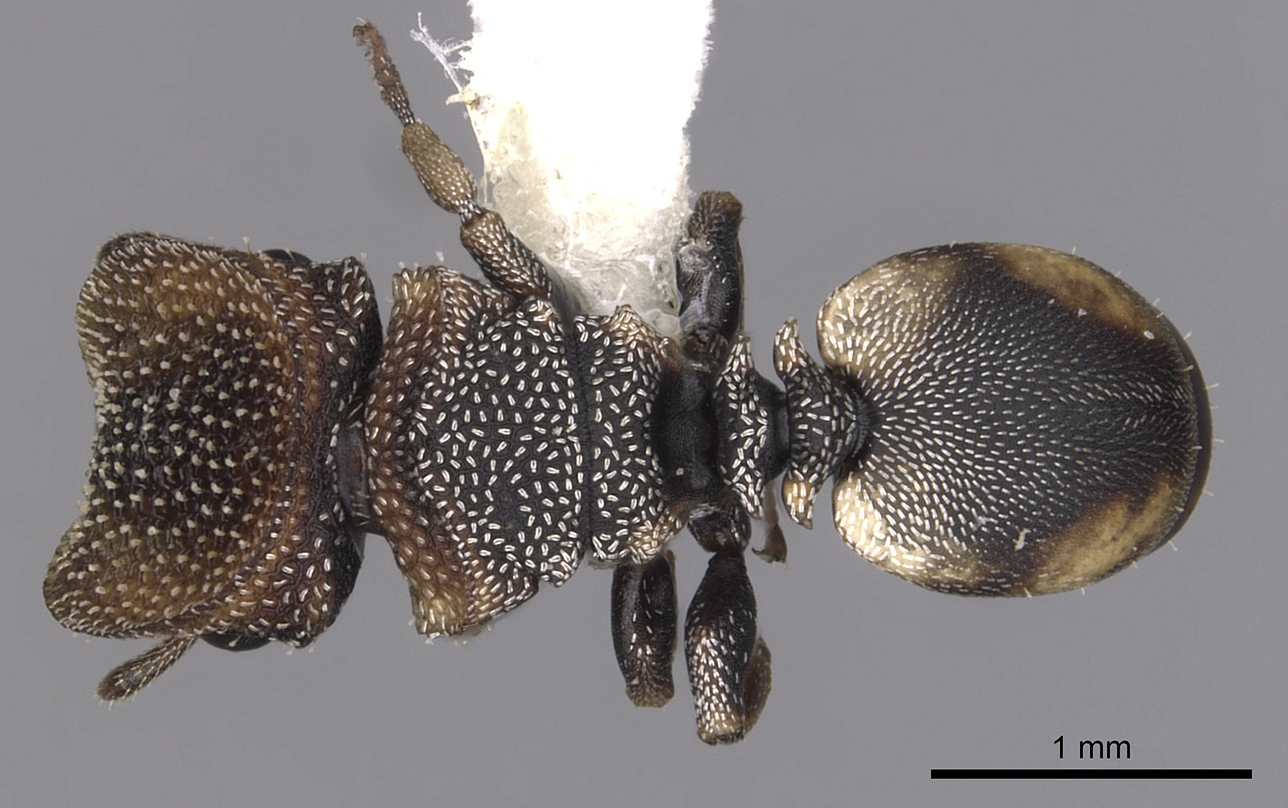

Scientific classification
- Domain: Eukaryota
- Kingdom: Animalia
- Phylum: Arthropoda
- Class: Insecta
- Order: Hymenoptera
- Family: Formicidae
- Subfamily: Myrmicinae
- Genus: Cephalotes
- Species: C. kukulcan

Binomial name
- Cephalotes kukulcan Snelling, 1999

= Cephalotes kukulcan =

Species of ant

Cephalotes kukulcan is a species of arboreal ant of the genus Cephalotes, characterized by an odd shaped head and the ability to "parachute" by steering its fall if it drops from the tree it is on, hence the alternative name of gliding ants.
