= Sphaerodactylus ciguapa =

Sphaerodactylus ciguapa Temporal range: Miocene

Scientific classification
- Kingdom: Animalia
- Phylum: Chordata
- Class: Reptilia
- Order: Squamata
- Suborder: Gekkota
- Family: Sphaerodactylidae
- Genus: Sphaerodactylus
- Species: †S. ciguapa

Binomial name
- †Sphaerodactylus ciguapa Daza & Bauer, 2012

Extinct species of lizard

Sphaerodactylus ciguapa is an extinct species of Sphaerodactylus that inhabited the Dominican Republic during the Miocene epoch.
