= La Toca Formation =

Geologic formation in the Dominican Republic

- Stratigraphic range: Burdigalian-Langhian (Hemingfordian); ~20–14 Ma
- Type: Formation
- Underlies: La Jaiba Conglomerate, Villa Trina Formation
- Overlies: Los Hidalgos Formation

Lithology
- Primary: Sandstone, marl, conglomerate, breccia
- Other: Dominican amber

Location
- Coordinates: 19.2°N 69.3°W
- Approximate paleocoordinates: 19.0°N 68.1°W
- Region: Duarte, Hermanas Mirabal, Puerto Plata Province, Samaná Province & La Vega Provinces
- Country: Dominican Republic
- Extent: Cordillera Septentrional, Cordillera Central

Type section
- Named for: La Toca mine
- Named by: Redmond
- Year defined: 1982
- La Toca Formation (the Dominican Republic)

The La Toca Formation is a geologic formation in the northern and eastern part of the Dominican Republic. The formation, predominantly an alternating sequence of marls and turbiditic sandstones, breccias and conglomerates, is renowned for the preservation of insects and other arthropods in amber, known as Dominican amber. The formation is dated to the Burdigalian to Langhian stages of the Miocene period (Hemingfordian in the NALMA classification).

== Description ==
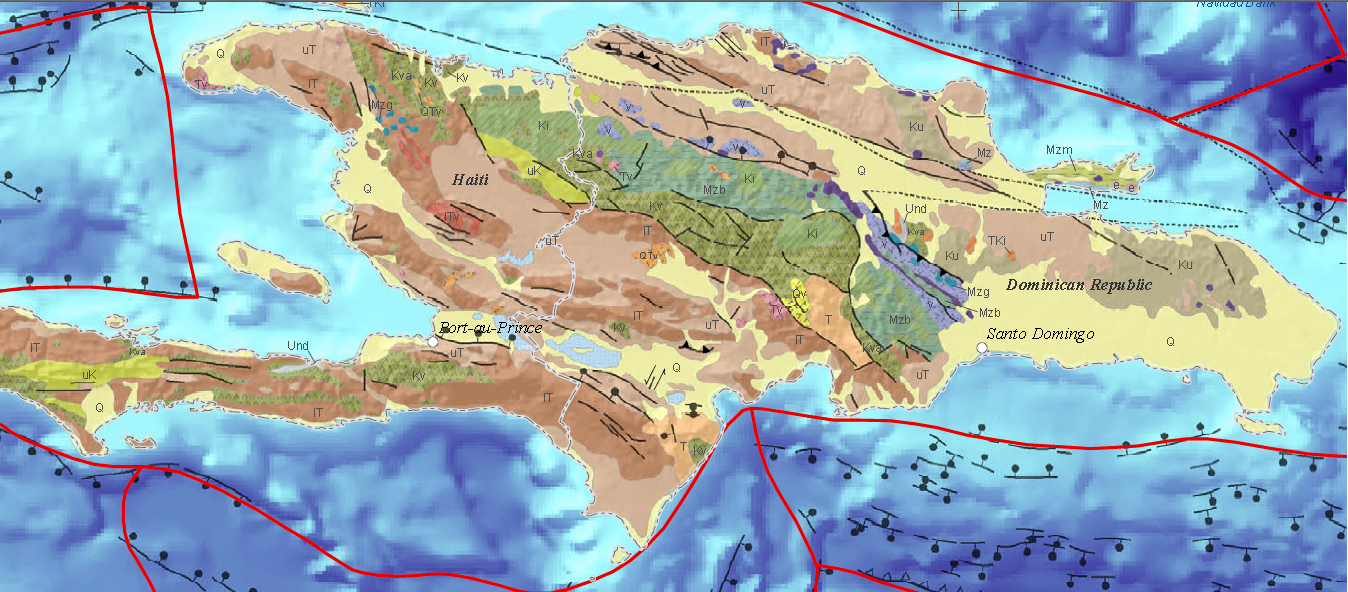
Geological map of Hispaniola. La Toca Formation forms part of the brown-colored areas in the north and northeast of the island, indicated by uT. The black triangles indicate the Late Eocene Hatillo thrust fault.

La Toca Formation was first defined by Redmond in 1982. The formation mainly consists of marls and turbiditic sandstones and conglomerates deposited in the northeastern part of Hispaniola. The formation overlies the Los Hidalgos Formation and is overlain by the La Jaiba Conglomerate and in places by the Villa Trina Formation. It is laterally and time-equivalent with the Altamira and Luperón Formations and the Agua Clara Unit.

Esperanza

In the vicinity of Esperanza, La Toca Formation is cropping out in the northeast of the geological map, while it is also present in the neighboring municipalities of Imbert and San Francisco Arriba. The formation in this area comprises rhythmic alternations of ochre fine-to-medium-grained, locally grading to course-grained sandstones and greyish clayey and ochre marls. This succession is locally cut by meters thick microconglomerates and conglomerates with rounded and subrounded clasts. Analysis of the clasts in San Francisco Arriba shows the clasts consist of up to ten percent of volcanic rock fragments, mainly limestone fragments (23-42%), quartz (8-33%), chert of up to five percent and minor metamorphic rock fragments. The matrix which comprises about a quarter of the volume is micritic.

The formation is in this area poor in microfossils, although foraminifera of Catapsydrax af. dissimilis, Globigerinoides trilobus, Globigerina sp., Globorotalia sp., Cibicides sp., Brizalina sp., Reophax sp., ?Cassidulina sp. and Pirgo sp. have been found in the succession.

Turbidite deposition moved to the northeast during the Miocene.

=== Tectonics and depositional environment ===
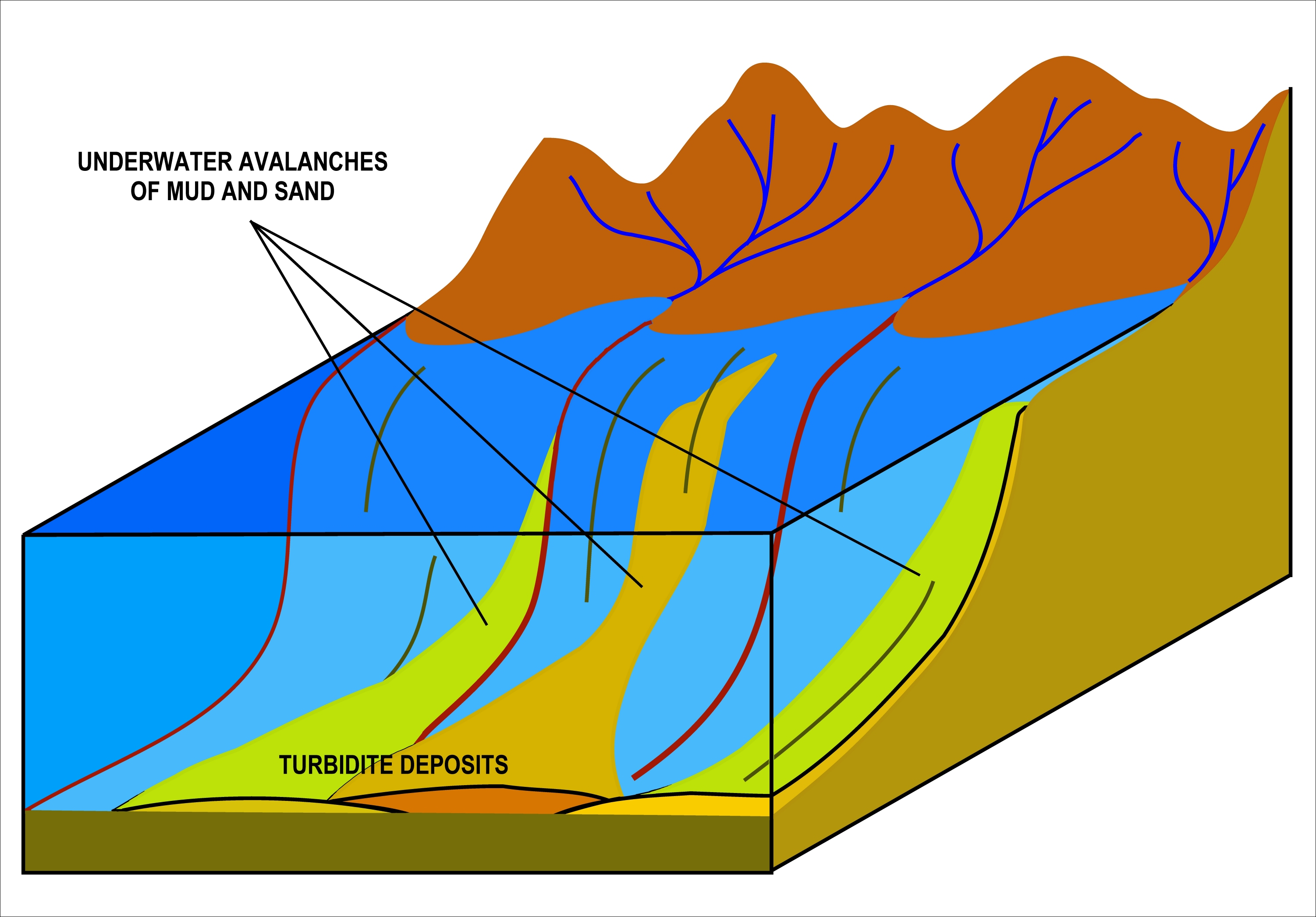
The turbidites of La Toca Formation were deposited at the base of slope

La Toca Formation is in places inverted and put in contact with the San Marcos Formation along the Camú Fault. The Septentrional Fault bounds the formation to the south.

=== Individual outcrops ===
The formation crops out in the provinces Puerto Plata and Hermanas Mirabal.

Puerto Plata

In Puerto Plata Province, two sections of La Toca Formation are visible. The type section along the Bajabonico River shows volcaniclastic breccias with clasts originating from the Pedro García Formation. The breccias are poorly stratified and contain angular clasts of vesicular basalts and andesites, polymictic conglomerates of various provenance and chlorite-rich feldspathic arenites. This sequence is overlain by bluish-grey marls and black silty shales with conglomeratic intercalactions.

A second outcrop in Puerto Plata shows a less typical debris flow setting, with a varied sedimentological character.

Hermanas Mirabal

The section of La Toca Formation in Hermanas Mirabal Province displays a thick series of matrix supported conglomerates. The clasts of these massively bedded conglomerates are characterized by two main lithology types; tuff and limestone. The limestone clasts are dark grey and white, where the light colored limestones contain carbonate platform fauna including corals. The clasts are well-rounded and medium-sized. The succession increases upwards in bedding thickness where limestone clasts become more dominant, larger in size and more angular. The total visible thickness of the succession is approximately 100 metres (330 ft).

The sequence of conglomerates and provenance of the clasts point to sedimentation in a deltaic to shallow marine environment, where the clasts were transported by fluvial systems in the hinterland.

== Paleontological significance ==
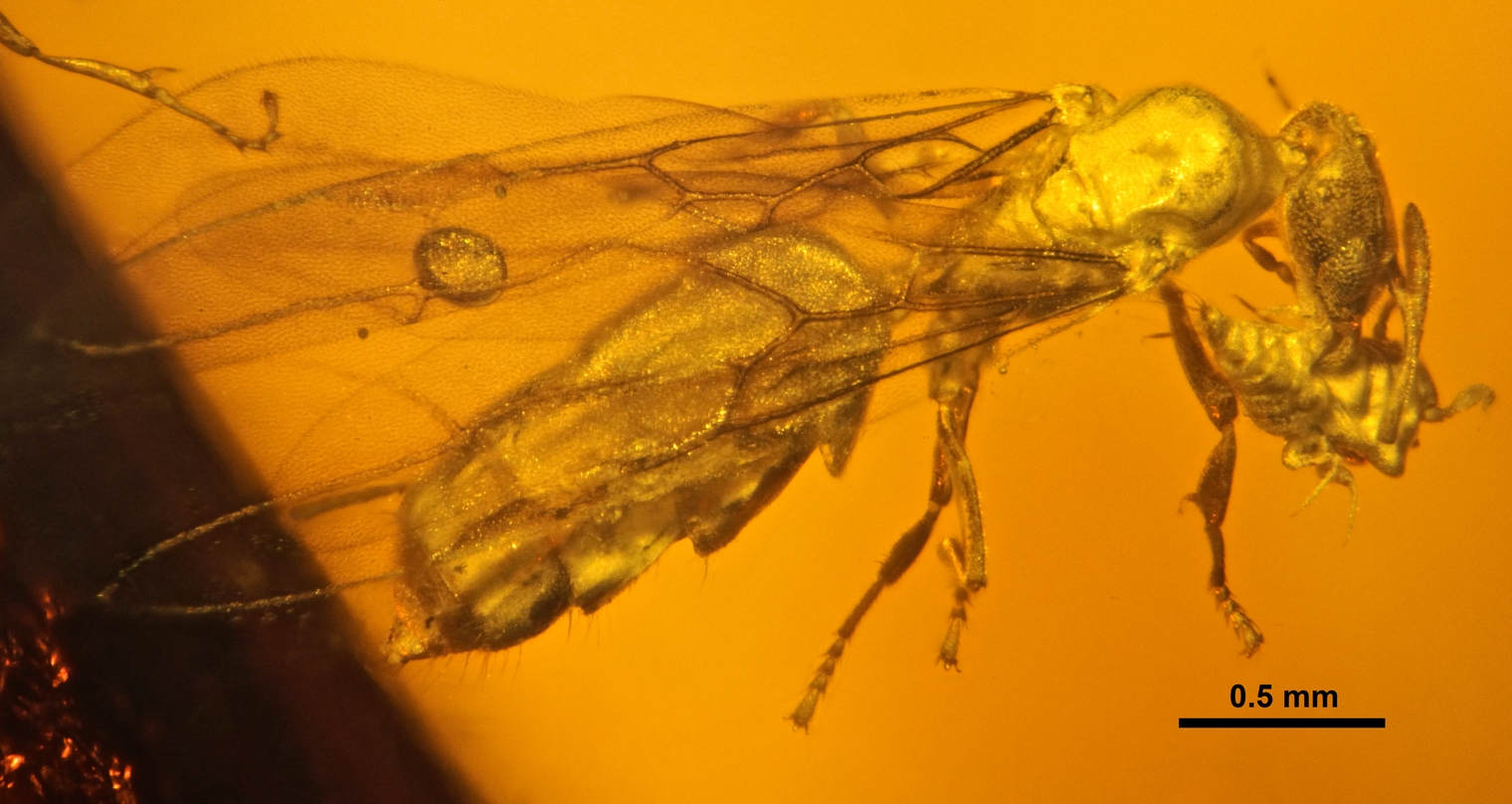
Electromyrmococcus abductus carried by Acropyga glaesaria La Toca mine of La Toca Formation

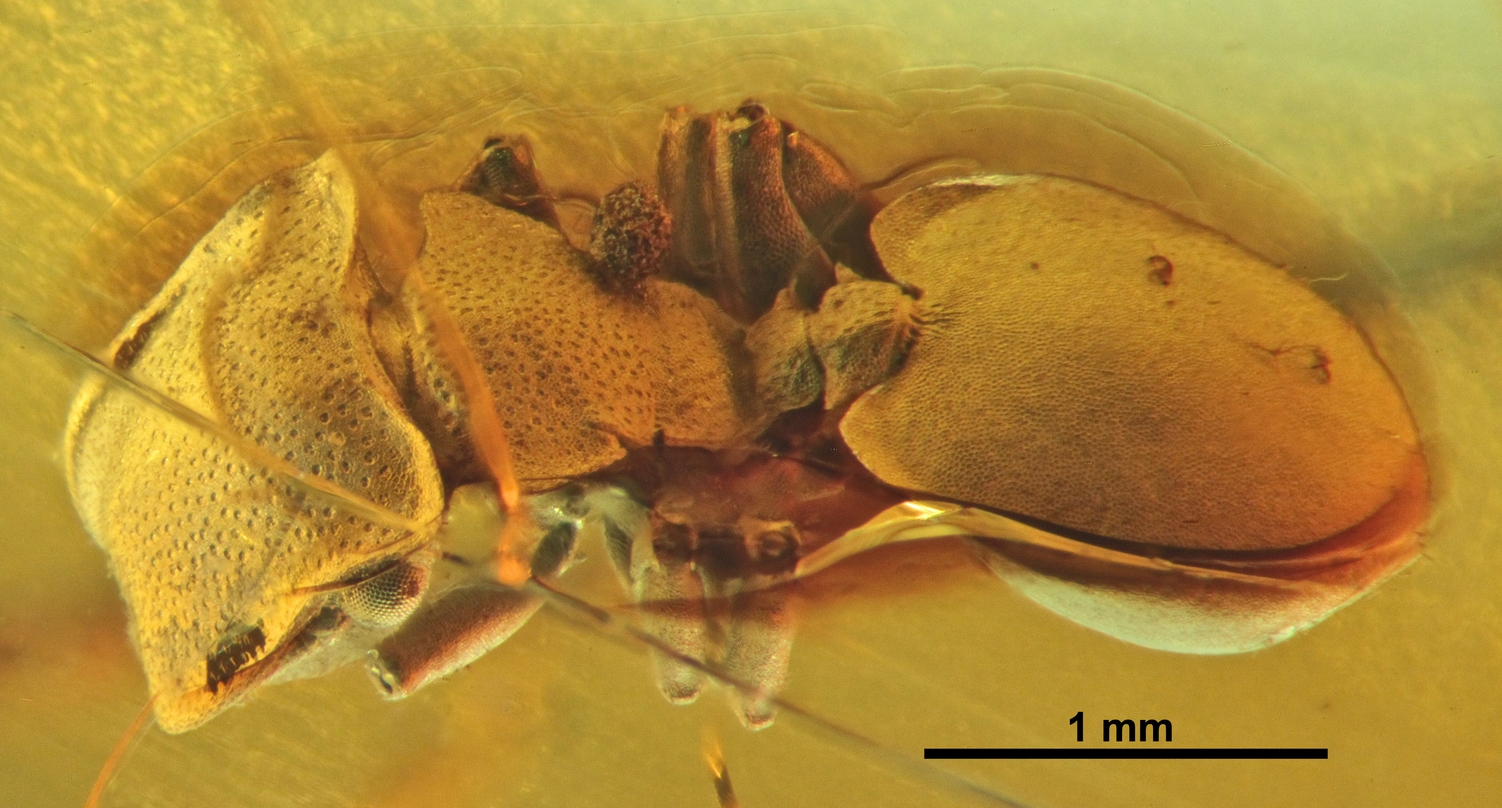
Cephalotes integerrimus from El Valle locality of La Toca Formation

La Toca Formation is one of the formations of the Dominican Republic where Dominican amber is found. The amber is known for the many types of insects and other arthropods it contains and even mammalian hair, a leptodactylid frog and a gilled mushroom have been discovered in the Dominican amber. Decades of study have led to an increased understanding of the invertebrate terrestrial fauna of the subtropical Early Miocene. Several genera have been described on the basis of these inclusions in resin from the fossil Hymenaea protera tree and the many fossils found in the amber provided a unique insight in the paleobiology of the Caribbean of the time. Of the 82 genera of spiders in Dominican amber, one third are extinct and about thirty percent are congeneric with extant taxa.

=== Fossil content ===
The following fossils have been found in the formation:

Group	Fossil	Location	Notes
Diptera	Brachypogon (Isohelea) dominicanus	El Valle	
Diptera	Forcipomyia (Lepidohelea) sp.	El Valle	
Diptera	Forcipomyia (Lepidohelea) antilleana	El Valle	
Diptera	Forcipomyia (Lepidohelea) chrysosuccinea	El Valle	
Diptera	Forcipomyia (Lepidohelea) domibicolor	El Valle	
Diptera	Miomyia	El Valle	
Diptera	Protortalotrypeta grimaldii	El Valle	
Diptera	Archicratyna arcana	El Valle	
Diptera	Procolobostema roseni	El Valle	
Diptera	Forcipomyia (Forcipomyia) sp.	La Toca mine	
Diptera	Procolobostema roseni	La Toca mine	
Diptera	Antiquatortia histuroides	La Toca mine	
Diptera	Culex malariager	La Toca mine (Poinar coll)	
Diptera	Dominimyza tanyacaena	La Toca mine (Poinar coll)	
Diptera	Diceratobasis worki	La Toca mine (Poinar coll)	
Diptera	Feroseta prisca	La Toca mine (Poinar coll)	
Diptera	Polyvena horatis	La Toca mine (Poinar coll)	
Diptera	Enischnomyia stegosoma	La Bucara mine (Poinar coll)	
Diptera	Archicratyna arcana	El Valle locality (Poinar coll)	
Hemiptera	Leptopharsa evsyunini	El Valle	
Hemiptera	Enicocephalus omen	La Toca mine	
Hemiptera	Enicocephalus seniculus	La Toca mine	
Hemiptera	Enicocephalus subvitreus	La Toca mine	
Hemiptera	Amnestus electricus	La Toca mine	
Hemiptera	Empiploiariola inermis	La Toca mine	
Hemiptera	Prisciba dominicana	La Toca mine (Poinar coll)	
Hemiptera	Apicrenus fossilis	La Toca mine (Poinar coll)	
Hemiptera	Praecoris dominicana	La Toca mine (Poinar coll)	
Hemiptera	Panstrongylus hispaniolae	La Toca mine (Poinar coll)	
Hemiptera	Schizoptera dominicana	La Toca mine (Poinar coll)	
Hemiptera	Electromyrmococcus abductus	La Toca mine (SMF coll)	
Hemiptera	Acropyga sp.	La Toca mine (SMF coll)	
Hemiptera	Minyscapheus dominicanus	La Bucara mine (Poinar coll)	
Hemiptera	Prisciba serrata	La Bucara mine (Poinar coll)	
Hemiptera	Hypselosoma dominicana	La Bucara mine (Poinar coll)	
Hemiptera	Schizoptera hispaniolae	La Bucara mine (Poinar coll)	
Hemiptera	Enicocephalus prius	La Vega group of mines (AMNH coll)	
Hemiptera	Electrobates spinipes	El Valle locality (Poinar coll)	
Coleoptera	Okamninus annae	La Toca mine	
Coleoptera	Caulophilus ashei	La Toca mine	
Coleoptera	Electroborus brighti	La Toca mine	
Coleoptera	Bicalcasura maculata	La Bucara mine (Poinar coll)	
Coleoptera	Dominibrentus leptus	Ron Cauble coll	
Hymenoptera	Pseudomyrmex antiquus	La Toca mine (Poinar coll)	
Hymenoptera	Wanderbiltiana wawasita	La Toca mine (Poinar coll)	
Hymenoptera	Technomyrmex hispaniolae	El Valle locality (MCZ coll)	
Hymenoptera	Proceratium gibberum	El Valle locality (MCZ coll)	
Hymenoptera	Cephalotes integerrimus	El Valle locality (MCZ coll)	
Orthoptera	Proanaxipha latoca	La Toca mine (Poinar coll)	
Orthoptera	Anaxipha dominica	La Toca mine (Poinar coll)	
Ephemeroptera	Borinquena parva	La Bucara mine (Manchester coll)	
Enoplea	Palaeodiplogaster brentiphila	Ron Cauble coll	
Symphypleona	?Sphyrotheca sp.	La Bucara mine (Manchester coll)	
Pterygota	Myopsocus arthuri	La Toca mine (Poinar coll)	
Pterygota	Troctopsocoides gracilis	Los Cacaos (INHS coll)	
Arachnida	Tityus geratus	La Toca mine (Poinar coll)	
Arachnida	Habrotrocha sp.	La Toca mine (Poinar coll)	
Arachnida	Bdelloidea indet.	La Toca mine (Poinar coll)	
Arachnida	Dipoena dominicana	La Toca mine (SMF coll)	
Phasmatodea	Clonistria dominicana	La Bucara mine (Poinar coll)	
Funghi	Coprinites dominicana	La Toca mine (Poinar coll)	

== See also ==
- List of fossiliferous stratigraphic units in the Dominican Republic
  - El Mamey Formation - Dominican amber formation of the Dominican Republic
  - Yanigua Formation - Dominican amber formation of the Dominican Republic
- Thomonde Formation - Early Miocene formation of Haiti
- Lagunitas Formation - Burdigalian fossiliferous formation of Cuba
- Cucaracha Formation - Burdigalian to Langhian fossiliferous formation of Panama
- Castillo Formation - Burdigalian fossiliferous formation of Venezuela
- Honda Group - Langhian fossiliferous formation of Colombia
