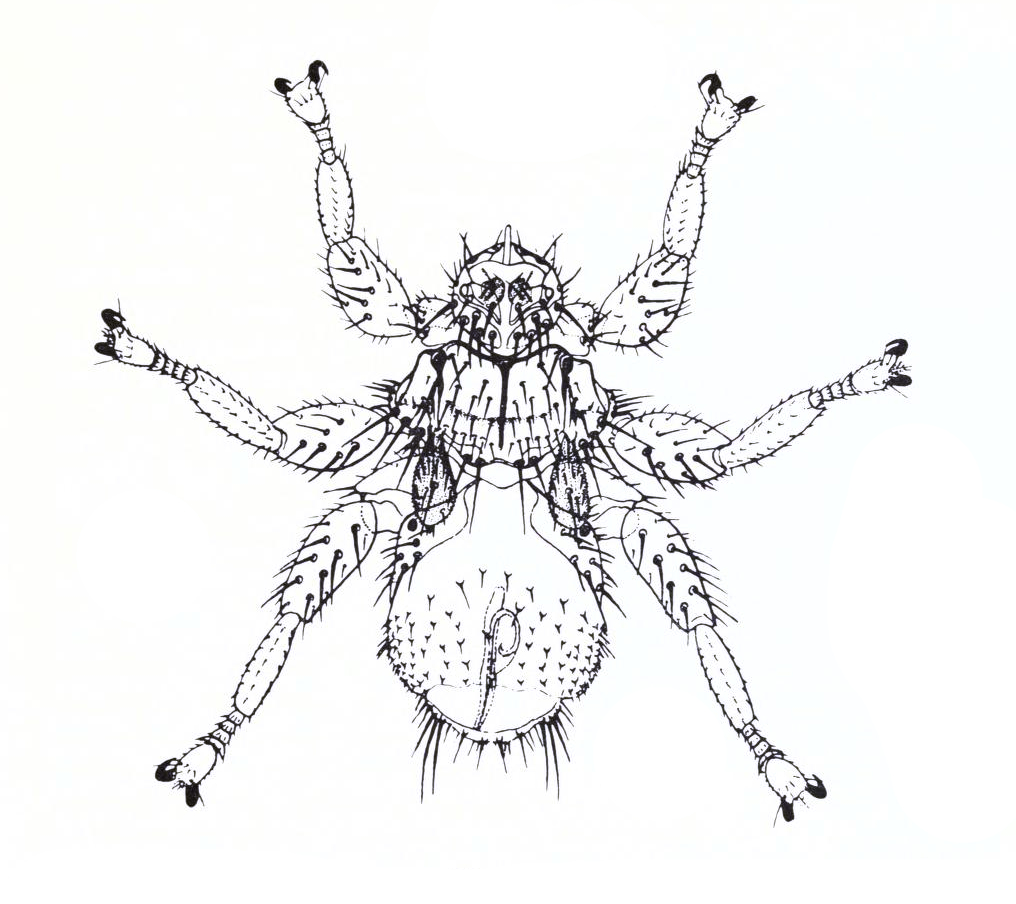
- Mastoptera guimaraesi

Scientific classification
- Kingdom: Animalia
- Phylum: Arthropoda
- Clade: Pancrustacea
- Class: Insecta
- Order: Diptera
- Superfamily: Hippoboscoidea
- Family: Streblidae; Kolenati, 1863

Subfamilies
- Ascodipterinae; Nycteriboscinae; Nycterophiliinae; Streblinae; Trichobiinae; but see text

= Streblidae =

Family of flies

The Streblidae are a family of flies in the superfamily Hippoboscoidea, and together with their relatives the Nycteribiidae, are known as bat flies. They are winged or wingless ectoparasites of bats, and often have long legs. They appear to be host-specific, with different species of bat flies occurring only on particular species of bat hosts, sometimes with multiple species of flies sharing a host bat.

== Systematics ==
The 237 or so species are divided among roughly 33 genera and five subfamilies. The monophyly of this family has not been supported. The streblid subfamily Trichobiinae may be more closely related to the Nycteriboscinae and other lineages in the Nycteribiidae. Several authors favor splitting the family into an Old World lineage consisting of the Ascodipterinae and Nycteriboscinae and a New World lineage containing all other subfamilies. The former would be named Ascodipterinae and the latter would retain the name Streblidae. Alternatively, the Streblidae and Nycteribiidae might be united as a monophyletic family containing all bat flies.

Subfamilies are here listed in presumed order of most ancient to most recently evolved. Selected genera are also given, sorted alphabetically, as too little is known about their interrelationships.

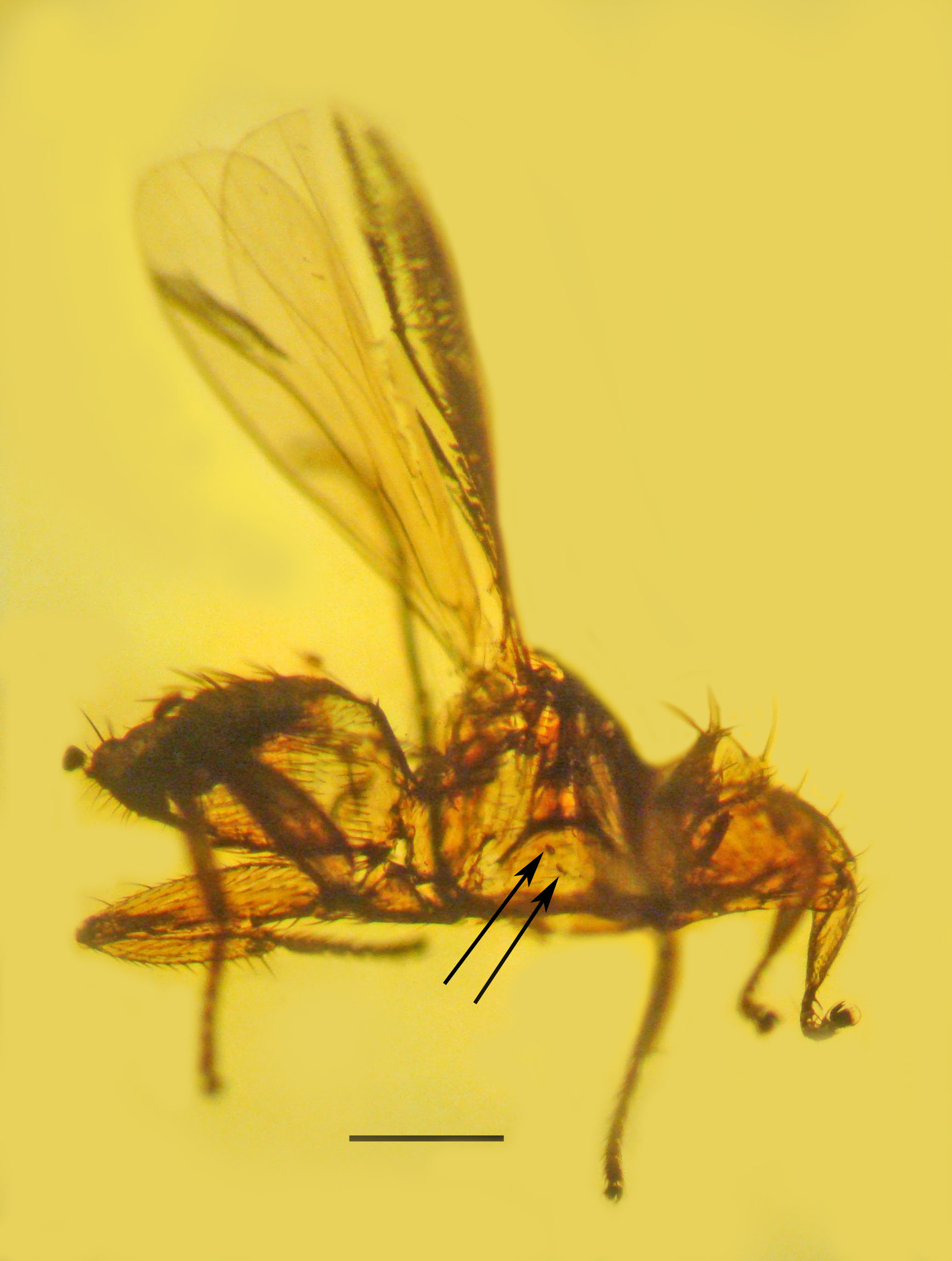
Enischnomyia holotype fossil in Dominican amber

- Subfamily Brachytarsininae Speiser 1900 (sometimes Nycteriboscinae)

- Genus Brachytarsina Macquart, 1851
- Genus Megastrebla Maa, 1971

- Subgenus Aoroura
- Subgenus Megastrebla Maa, 1971

- Genus Raymondia Frauenfeld, 1855
- Genus Raymondiodes Jobling, 1954

- Subfamily Ascodipterinae Monticelli 1898

- Genus Ascodipteron Adensamer, 1896
- Genus Maabella Hastriter & Bush, 2006
- Genus Paraascodipteron Advani & Vazirani, 1981

- Subfamily Nycterophiliinae Wenzel, 1966

- Genus Nycterophilia Ferris, 1916
- Genus Phalconomus Wenzel, 1984

- Subfamily Streblinae Speiser, 1900

- Genus Anastrebla Wenzel, 1966
- Genus Metelasmus Coquillett, 1907
- Genus Paraeuctenodes Pessôa & Guimarães, 1937
- Genus Strebla Wiedemann, 1824

- Subfamily Trichobiinae Jobling, 1936

- Genus Anatrichobius Wenzel, 1966
- Genus Aspidoptera Coquillett, 1899
- Genus Eldunnia Curran, 1934
- Genus Exastinion Wenzel, 1966
- Genus Joblingia Dybas & Wenzel, 1947
- Genus Mastoptera Wenzel, 1966
- Genus Megistopoda Macquart, 1852
- Genus Megistapophysis Dick & Wenzel, 2006
- Genus Neotrichobius Wenzel & Aitken, 1966
- Genus Noctiliostrebla Wenzel, 1966
- Genus Paradyschiria Speiser, 1900
- Genus Parastrebla Wenzel, 1966
- Genus Paratrichobius Costa Lima, 1921
- Genus Pseudostrebla Costa Lima, 1921
- Genus Speiseria Kessel, 1925
- Genus Stizostrebla Jobling, 1939
- Genus Synthesiostrebla Townsend, 1913
- Genus Trichobioides Wenzel, 1966
- Genus Trichobius Gervais, 1844
- Genus Xenotrichobius Wenzel, 1976

- Subfamily incertae sedis

- †Enischnomyia Poinar & Brown, 2012

== Morphology ==
One of the characteristic feature of streblid bat flies is their variable degree of eye reduction. The compound eyes are highly, but variably reduced, with some species containing only rudimentary eye spots. Ocelli are absent in all species. Wing morphology also significantly varies within the family with some species containing fully functional wings, while others contain either reduced (non functional or functional) wings or no wings at all.

== Parasites ==
Streblid bat flies, which are parasites, are themselves infested by fungi of the order Laboulbeniales; these fungi are thus hyperparasites.
