= Bat fly =

Insect

Bat flies are members of the insect order Diptera, the true flies, which are external parasites of bats. Two families of flies are exclusively bat flies: Nycteribiidae and Streblidae. Bat flies have a cosmopolitan distribution, meaning that they are found around the world. Nycteribiidae and Streblidae are members of the superfamily Hippoboscoidea, along with the families Hippoboscidae and Glossinidae. Another family the Mystacinobiidae with just one species Mystacinobia zelandica under the superfamily Oestroidea is unusual in feeding on the guano of bats in New Zealand. They are wingless, have reduced eyes, and are phoretic on bats.
