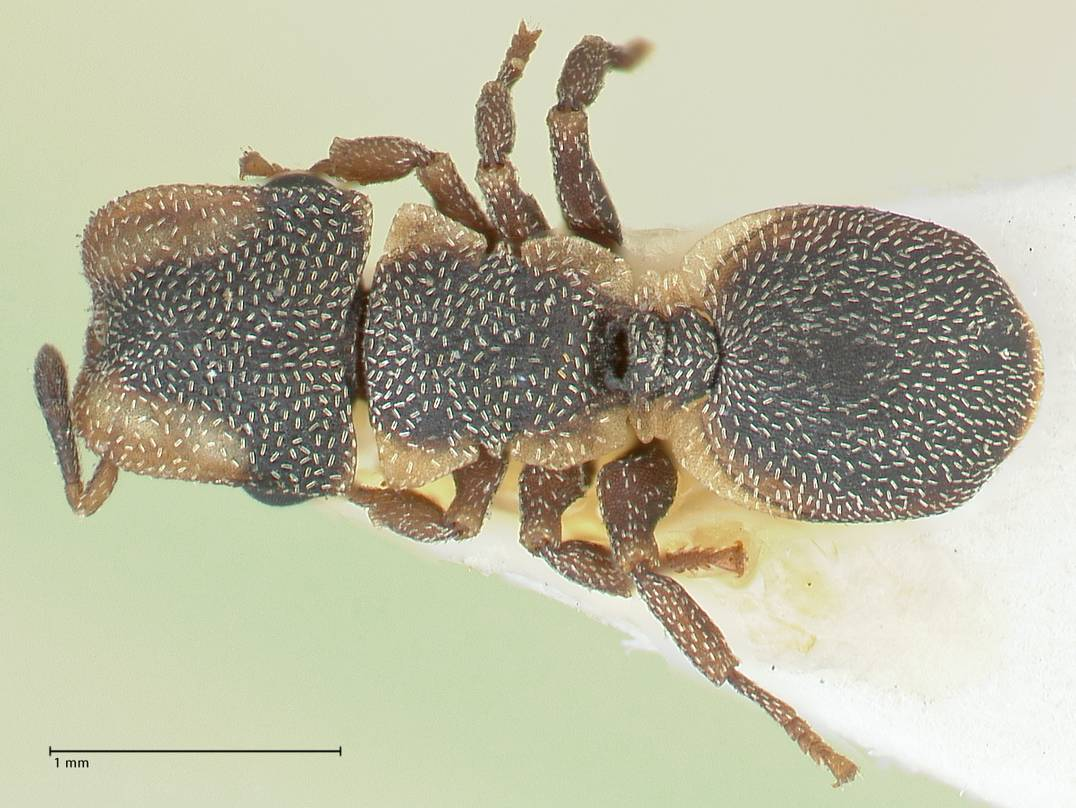

Scientific classification
- Domain: Eukaryota
- Kingdom: Animalia
- Phylum: Arthropoda
- Class: Insecta
- Order: Hymenoptera
- Family: Formicidae
- Subfamily: Myrmicinae
- Genus: Cephalotes
- Species: C. pinelii

Binomial name
- Cephalotes pinelii (Guérin-Méneville, 1844)

= Cephalotes pinelii =

Species of ant

Cephalotes pinelii is a species of arboreal ant of the genus Cephalotes, characterized by an odd shaped head and the ability to "parachute" by steering their fall if they drop off of the tree they're on. They're also known as gliding ants.
