= List of Scarabaeidae subfamilies and tribes =

The beetle family Scarabaeidae is made up of about 28 subfamilies containing more than 100 tribes. There are more than 2,500 genera and 35,000 described species in Scarabaeidae.

The following subfamilies and tribes are in accordance with those in Catalog of Life (2023) and Dietz, Ahrens, et al. (2023). The tribe Hopliini is placed as a subfamily in Catalogue of Life, but is listed as a tribe of subfamily Melolonthinae here. The subfamilies Sericinae and Sericoidinae were suggested in Dietz, Ahrens, et al. (2023) and are included in the Catalogue of Life. The subfamily Lichniinae is sometimes considered a tribe, Lichniini.

== Subfamily Aclopinae Blanchard, 1850 ==
- Aclopini Blanchard, 1850
- Holcorobeini Nikolajev, 1992
- Phaenognathini Iablokoff-Khnozorian, 1977

== Subfamily Aegialiinae Castelnau, 1840 ==
- Aegialiini Castelnau, 1840
- Saprinianini Nikolajev, 2011

== Subfamily Aphodiinae Leach, 1815 ==
- Aphodiini Leach, 1815
- Corythoderini Schmidt, 1910
- Eupariini Schmidt, 1910
- Hornietiini Minkina, 2020
- Odochilini Rakovič, 1987
- Odontolochini Stebnicka & Howden, 1996
- Psammodiini Mulsant, 1842
- Rhyparini Schmidt, 1910
- Stereomerini Howden & Storey, 1992
- Termitoderini Tangelder & Krikken, 1982
- Thinorycterini Semenov & Reichardt, 1925
- †Psammaegialiini Nikolajev, Wang & Zhang, 2014

== Subfamily Cetoniinae Leach, 1815 ==
- Cetoniini Leach, 1815
- Cremastocheilini Burmeister & Schaum, 1841
- Diplognathini Burmeister, 1842
- Goliathini Latreille, 1829
- Gymnetini Kirby, 1827
- Phaedimini Schoch, 1894
- Schizorhinini Burmeister, 1842
- Stenotarsiini Kraatz, 1880
- Taenioderini Mikšić, 1976
- Xiphoscelidini Krikken, 1984

== Subfamily Dynastinae MacLeay, 1819 ==
- Agaocephalini Burmeister, 1847
- Cyclocephalini Castelnau, 1840
- Dynastini Macleay, 1819
- Hexodontini Lacordaire, 1855
- Oryctini Mulsant, 1842
- Oryctoderini Endrödi, 1966
- Pentodontini Mulsant, 1842
- Phileurini Burmeister, 1847

== Subfamily Eremazinae Stebnicka, 1977 ==
- Eremazini Stebnicka, 1977
- †Yixianscarabaeini Nikolajev, 2015

== Subfamily Melolonthinae MacLeay, 1819 ==
- Acomini Evans & Smith, 2020
- Ardellini Paulsen, 2021
- Athliini Smith & Evans, 2018
- Chasmatopterini Lacordaire, 1855
- Chnaunanthini Evans & Smith, 2020
- Colymbomorphini Blanchard, 1850
- Comophini Britton, 1978
- Dichelonychini Kirby, 1837
- Diphycerini Medvedev, 1952
- Diplotaxini Kirby, 1837
- Euchirini Hope, 1840
- Hopliini Latreille, 1829
- Langbianellini Prokofiev, 2015
- Macrodactylini Kirby, 1837
- Melolonthini Leach, 1819
- Pachypodini Erichson, 1840
- Pachytrichini Burmeister, 1855
- Phobetusini Evans & Smith, 2020
- Phyllotocidiini Britton, 1957
- Podolasiini Howden, 1997
- Rhizotrogini Burmeister, 1855
- Systellopini Dalla Torre, 1912
- Warwickiini Evans & Smith, 2020
- †Cretomelolonthini Nikolajev, 1998

== Subfamily Orphninae Erichson, 1847 ==
- Aegidiini Paulian, 1984
- Orphnini Erichson, 1847

== Subfamily Pachydeminae Reitter, 1902 ==
- Aegosthetini Lacroix, 2007
- Pachydemini Burmeister, 1855

== Subfamily Phaenomeridinae ==
Authority: Erichson, 1847

- Cymboptera Ohaus, 1923
- Oxychirus Quedenfeldt, 1888
- Phaenomeris Hope, 1833

== Subfamily Rutelinae MacLeay, 1819 ==
- Adoretini Burmeister, 1844
- Alvarengiini Frey, 1975
- Anatistini Lacordaire, 1855
- Anomalini Streubel, 1839
- Anoplognathini MacLeay, 1819
- Geniatini Burmeister, 1844
- Rutelini MacLeay, 1819

== Subfamily Scarabaeinae Latreille, 1802 ==
- Ateuchini Perty, 1830
- Byrrhidiini Davis, Deschodt & Scholtz, 2019
- Coprini Leach, 1815
- Deltochilini Lacordaire, 1855
- Dichotomiini Pereira, 1954
- Endroedyolini Davis, Deschodt & Scholtz, 2019
- Epactoidini Rossini et al, 2022
- Epilissini Lansberge, 1874
- Epirinini Lansberge, 1874
- Eucraniini Burmeister, 1873
- Gymnopleurini Streubel, 1846
- Odontolomini Davis, Deschodt & Scholtz, 2019
- Oniticellini Kolbe, 1905
- Onitini Castelnau, 1840
- Onthophagini Streubel, 1846
- Parachoriini Tarasov, 2017
- Phanaeini Hope, 1838
- Scarabaeini Latreille, 1802
- Sisyphini Mulsant, 1842

== Subfamily Sericinae Kirby, 1837 ==
- Ablaberini Blanchard, 1850
- Diphucephalini Castelnau, 1840
- Sericini Kirby, 1837

== Subfamily Sericoidinae Erichson, 1847 ==
- Automoliini Britton, 1978
- Heteronychini Lacordaire, 1855
- Liparetrini Burmeister, 1855
- Maechidiini Burmeister, 1855
- Phyllotocini Burmeister, 1855
- Scitalini Britton, 1957
- Sericoidini Erichson, 1847

== Subfamily Trichiinae Kolbe, 1897 ==
- Trichiini Fleming, 1821

== Subfamily Valginae Schenkling, 1922 ==
- Valgini Mulsant, 1842

== Subfamily †Prototroginae Nikolajev, 2000 ==
- †Prototrox Nikolajev, 2000
