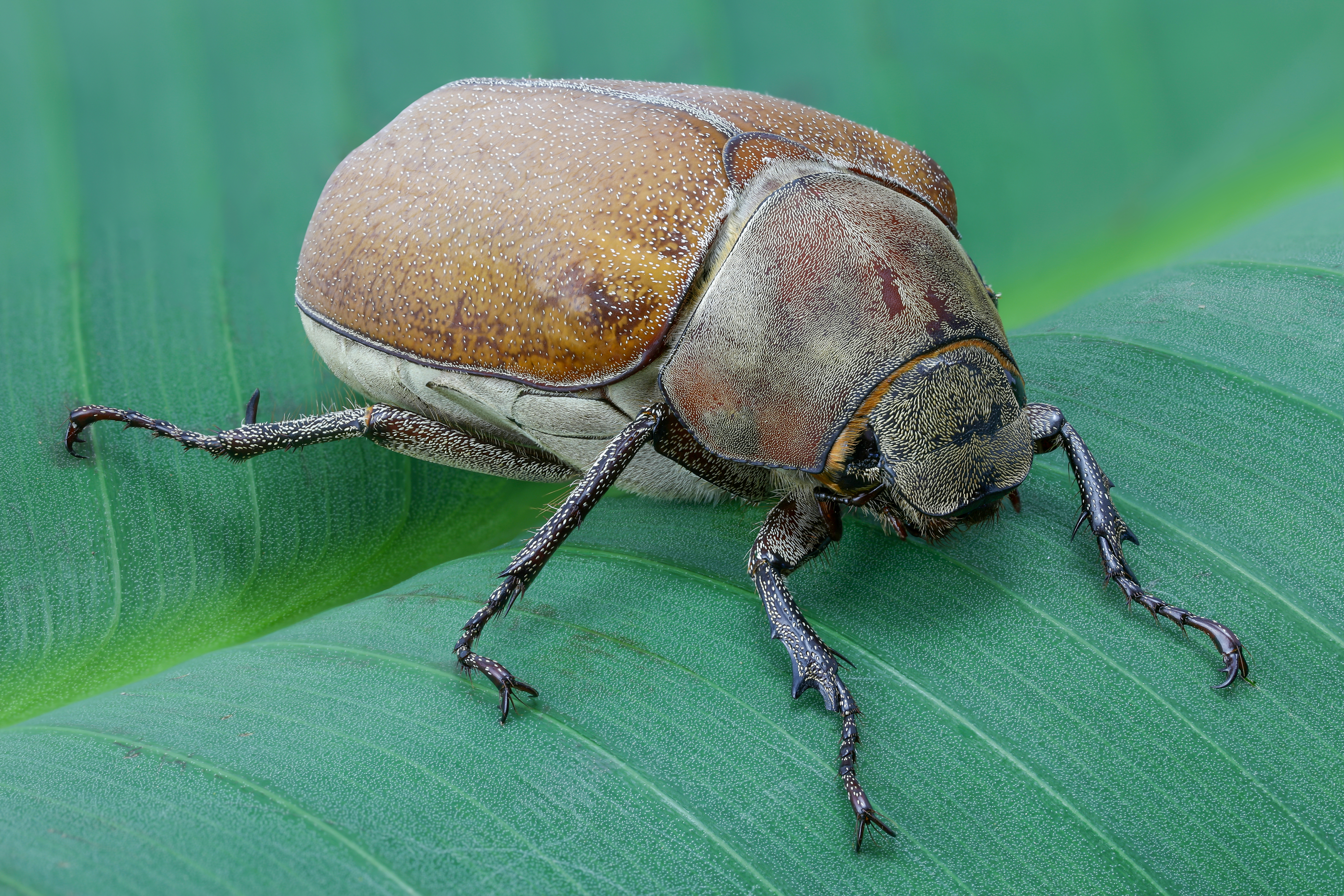
- Lepidiota sp. (Melolonthini)

Scientific classification
- Kingdom: Animalia
- Phylum: Arthropoda
- Clade: Pancrustacea
- Class: Insecta
- Order: Coleoptera
- Suborder: Polyphaga
- Infraorder: Scarabaeiformia
- Family: Scarabaeidae
- Subfamily: Melolonthinae; Leach, 1819

Diversity
- About 20–30 tribes

Synonyms
- Hopliinae; Melolonthidae; Systellopodinae

= Melolonthinae =

Subfamily of beetles

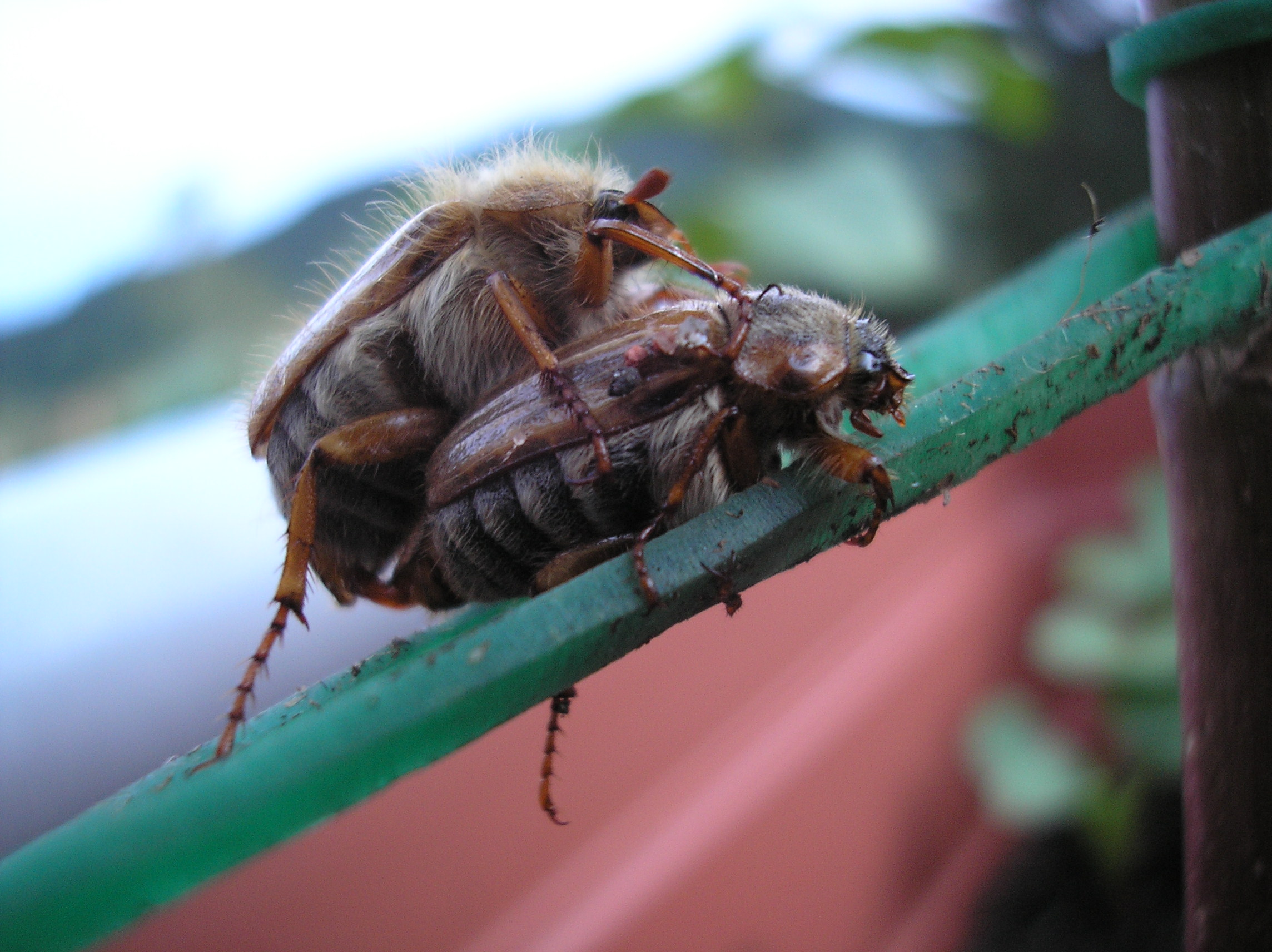
Mating Rhizotrogus marginipes (Melolonthini), male on top – note sexually dimorphic antennae

Melolonthinae is a subfamily of the scarab beetles (family Scarabaeidae). It is a very diverse group; distributed over most of the world, it contains over 11,000 species in over 750 genera. Some authors include the scarab subfamilies Euchirinae and Pachypodinae as tribes in the Melolonthinae.

Unlike some of their relatives, their habitus is usually not bizarre. They resemble the Rutelinae in being fairly plesiomorphic in outward appearance. Like in many Scarabaeidae, males have large fingered antennae, while those of the females are smaller and somewhat knobby. In the Melolonthinae, this sexual dimorphism is particularly pronounced. Many species have striking – though rarely brilliant or iridescent – hues and bold patterns of hairs.

Being often quite sizeable and swarming in numbers at certain times, for example the Amphimallon, Phyllophaga and Polyphylla "June beetles" or the Melolontha cockchafers – all from tribe Melolonthini – feature widely in folklore. Some Melolonthinae are economically significant pests. Other than the Melolonthini, the most diverse tribes are the Ablaberini, Liparetrini, Macrodactylini, Tanyproctini and Sericini.

== Description ==
Melolonthinae adults range from 3 to 58 mm in length and are usually brown or black in colour. Some species are shiny, while many are covered in setae or scales. The clypeus, a structure on the head above the mouthparts, is not armed with teeth. There are two antennae, each with 7 to 10 segments, of which the last 3 to 7 segments are elongate and form a club, and the antennal bases are usually concealed from above. The scutellum is exposed at the base of the elytra. The margins of the elytra are straight instead of strongly curved. Each leg ends in a pair of tarsal claws that are often toothed or double.

Larvae are C-shaped with a white/cream body and a darker, well-sclerotised head. They can be distinguished from other scarabaeid larvae by the galea and lacinia either partly fused proximally or fitting tightly together, the mandibles lacking stridulatory areas, the apical segment of the antenna about as wide as its penultimate segment, and the anal cleft usually Y-shaped or angulate.

== Life cycle ==
The Melolonthinae life cycle has the four stages of egg, larva, pupa and adult, similar to other beetles. Eggs are laid in soil, which is also where the larval and pupal stages occur. Adults occur above ground. The larval stage is long and may last up to two years, whereas the adult stage is short and lasts only a few days or weeks.

== Diet ==
Larval melolonthines feed on plant roots and humus. Known host plants include grasses, clover and sugarcane. Adults may (e.g. Automolius, Diphucephala, Heteronyx, Liparetrus, Phyllotocus and Sericesthis) or may not feed (e.g. Antitrogus and Rhopaea). Adults that feed do so on the leaves of trees, such as eucalypts, or on flowers or pollen.

== Behaviour ==
Adults are usually crepuscular or nocturnal, but the flower- and pollen-feeding species are often diurnal. They are often attracted to light.

In feeding species, adults gather on trees and this helps them find each other to mate. In non-feeding species, virgin females emit a sex pheromone so that males can find them.

== Pests ==
Larvae of Sericesthis spp. are pasture pests, while larvae of Dermolepida albohirtum, Antitrogus and Lepidiota are sugarcane pests. Lepidiota stigma is another sugarcane pest and also attacks corn, sorghum and various fruits. Adults of Phyllophaga spp. can sometimes cause complete defoliation of deciduous trees.

== Systematics ==
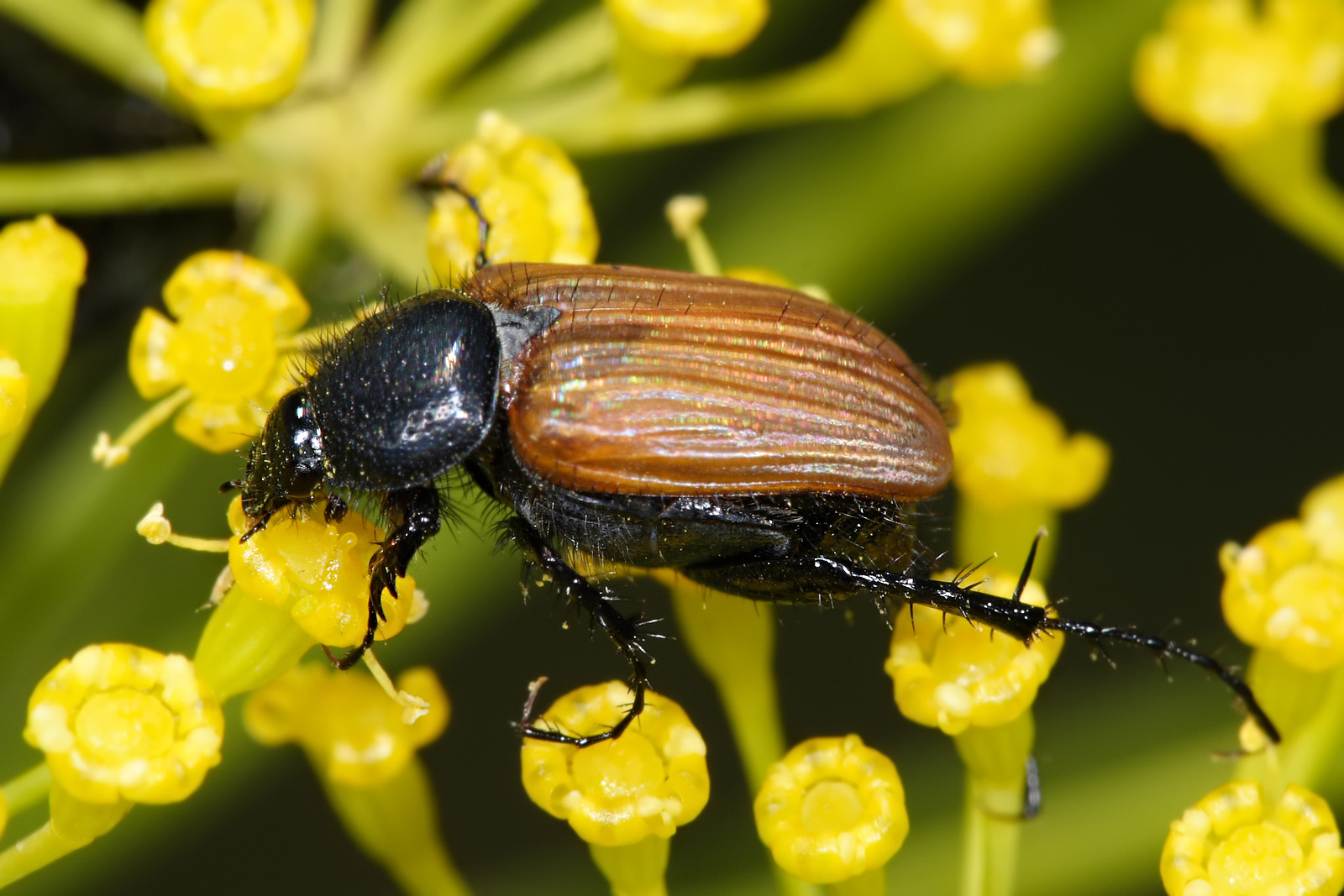
Phyllotocus sp. (Sericini)

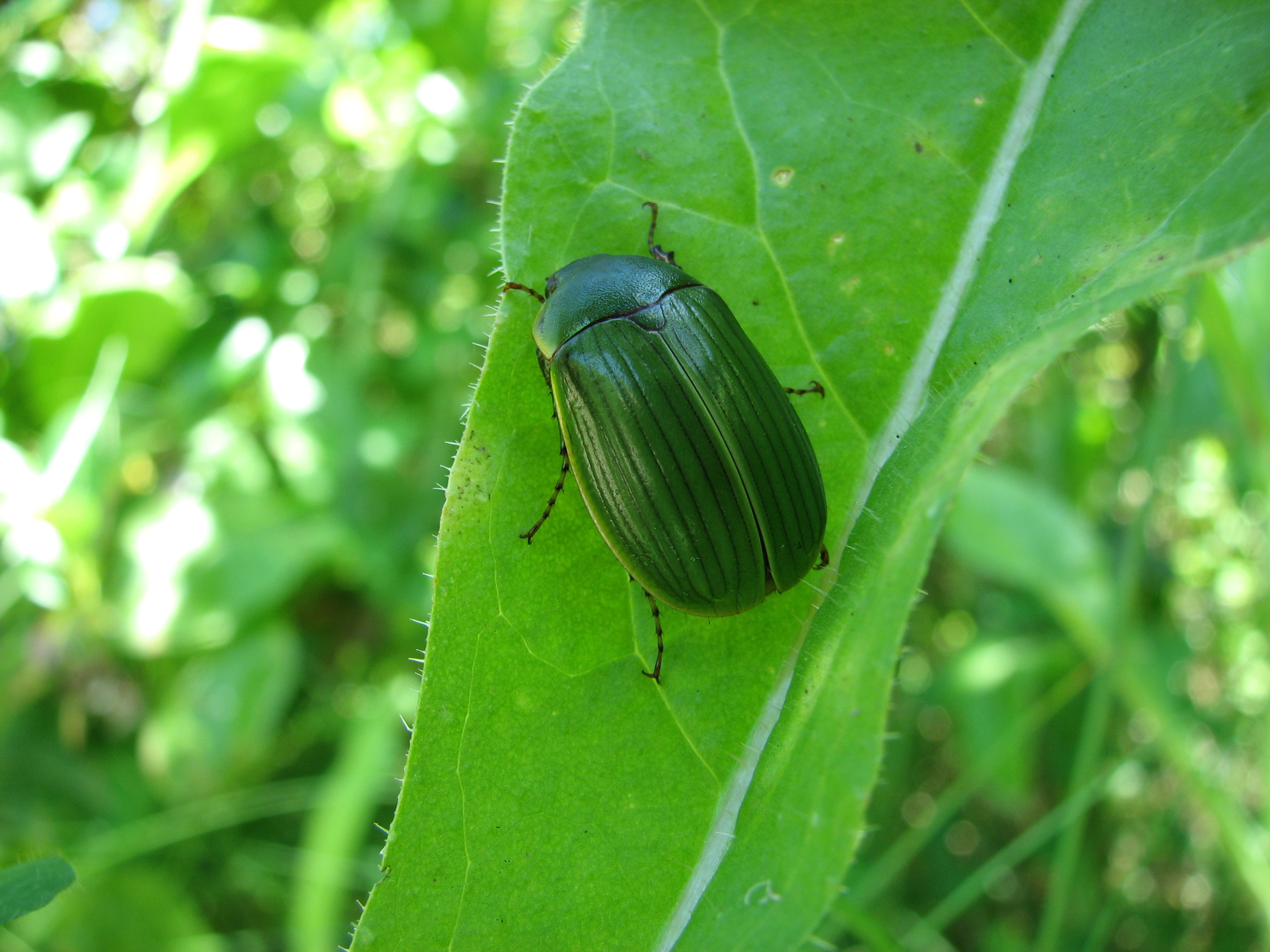
Stethaspis sp. (Colymbomorphini)

Leucopholina in Laos, moving its head

Traditionally, various authors, divided the living Melolonthinae into about 20–30 tribes:

- Ablaberini Burmeister, 1855 – including Camentini
- Automoliini Britton, 1978
- Chasmatopterini Lacordaire, 1856
- Colymbomorphini Blanchard, 1850 – including Stethaspini and Xylonichini
  - Colymbomorpha Blanchard, 1850
  - Stethaspis Hope, 1837
  - Xylonichus Boisduval, 1835
- Comophorinini Britton, 1957 – including Comophini
- Dichelonychini Burmeister 1855
- Diphucephalini Britton, 1957
- Diphycerini Medvedev, 1952 – sometimes in Macrodactylini
- Diplotaxini Kirby, 1837 – sometimes in Melolonthini
- Heteronychini Britton, 1957
  - Heteronyx Guérin-Méneville, 1838
- Hopliini Latreille, 1829
- Leucopholini Burmeister, 1855
- Lichniini Burmeister, 1844
- Liparetrini Burmeister, 1855 – including Allarini, Colpochilini
- Macrodactylini Kirby, 1837 – including Dichelonyciini
- Maechidiini Burmeister, 1855
- Melolonthini Leach, 1819 – including Rhizotrogini
  - Amphimallon
  - Brahmina
  - Holotrichia
  - Leucopholis
  - Melolontha – cockchafers, May bugs
  - Phyllophaga – May beetles
  - Polyphylla
  - Rhizotrogus
- Oncerini LeConte, 1861
- Pachytrichini Burmeister, 1855
- Phyllotocidiini Britton, 1957
  - Phyllotocus
- Podolasiini Howden, 1997 – sometimes in Hopliini
- Scitalini Britton, 1957
- Sericini Dalla Torre, 1912
  - Maladera
- Sericoidini Burmeister, 1855
- Systellopini Sharp, 1877
- Tanyproctini Erichson, 1847 – includes Pachydemini

In addition, a prehistoric tribe, the Cretomelolonthini, is only known from fossils.

Several genera are of unclear relations; they are not yet firmly placed in a tribe:

- Acoma
- Conebius Fuavel, 1903
- Costelytra – Liparetrini?
- Hemictenius – Pachydemini?
- Metascelis Westwood, 1842
- Mycernus – Colymbomorphini?
- Odontria – Liparetrini?
- Prodontria – Liparetrini?
- Psilodontria – Colymbomorphini?
- Scythrodes – Liparetrini?
- Sericospilus – Liparetrini?
- Xenaclopus

"Anonetus" and "Tryssus", both used by Erichson in 1847, are nomina nuda. Holophylla and Hoplorida are of uncertain validity.

Recent studies have revealed that the broad concept of the Melolonthinae, as used before, is paraphyletic. To resolve this, the subfamilies Sericinae Kirby, 1837 and Sericoidinae Erichson, 1847 have been reinstated. This results in the following classification:

- Sericinae Kirby, 1837
  - Ablaberini Blanchard, 1850
  - Diphucephalini Laporte, 1840
  - Sericini Kirby, 1837
    - Astaenina Burmeister, 1855
    - Sericina Kirby, 1837
    - Trochalina Brenske, 1898
- Sericoidinae Erichson, 1847
  - Automoliini Britton, 1978
  - Heteronychini Lacordaire, 1855
  - Liparetrini Burmeister, 1855
  - Maechidiini Burmeister, 1855
  - Phyllotocini Burmeister, 1855
  - Scitalini Britton, 1957
  - Sericoidini Erichson, 1847
- Melolonthinae MacLeay, 1819
  - Acomini Evans & Smith, 2020
  - Ardellini Paulsen, 2021
  - Athliini Smith & Evans, 2018
  - Chasmatopterini Lacordaire, 1855
  - Chnaunanthini Evans & Smith, 2020
  - Colymbomorphini Blanchard, 1850
  - Comophini Britton, 1978
  - Dichelonychini Kirby, 1837
  - Diphycerini Medvedev, 1952
  - Diplotaxini Kirby, 1837
  - Euchirini Hope, 1840
  - Heptophyllini Medvedev, 1951
  - Hopliini Latreille, 1829
  - Langbianellini Prokofiev, 2015
  - Leucopholini Burmeister, 1855
  - Macrodactylini Kirby, 1837
  - Melolonthini Leach, 1819
  - Pachypodini Erichson, 1840
  - Pachytrichini Burmeister, 1855
  - Phobetusini Evans & Smith, 2020
  - Phyllotocidiini Britton, 1957
  - Rhizotrogini Burmeister, 1855
  - Schizonychini Burmeister, 1855
  - Systellopini Dalla Torre, 1912
  - Tanyproctini Erichson, 1847
  - Warwickiini Evans & Smith, 2020
  - †Cretomelolonthini Nikolajev, 1998
