= Callabonica =

Scientific classification
- Kingdom: Animalia
- Phylum: Arthropoda
- Class: Insecta
- Order: Coleoptera
- Suborder: Polyphaga
- Infraorder: Scarabaeiformia
- Family: Scarabaeidae
- Subfamily: Sericoidinae
- Tribe: Heteronychini
- Genus: Callabonica; Blackburn, 1895
- Species: C. propria

Binomial name
- Callabonica propria Blackburn, 1895

Genus of beetles

Callabonica is a genus of beetle of the family Scarabaeidae. It is monotypic, being represented by the single species, Callabonica propria, which is found in Australia (South Australia).

== Description ==
Adults reach a length of about 10.5 mm. The head and pronotum are black, while the elytra are piceous, with obvious pale, membranous apical margins.
