= Acheilo pedarius =

Scientific classification
- Kingdom: Animalia
- Phylum: Arthropoda
- Clade: Pancrustacea
- Class: Insecta
- Order: Coleoptera
- Suborder: Polyphaga
- Infraorder: Scarabaeiformia
- Family: Scarabaeidae
- Genus: Acheilo
- Species: A. pedarius

Binomial name
- Acheilo pedarius (Blackburn, 1910)

Synonyms
- Heteronyx pedarius Blackburn, 1910

Species of beetle

Acheilo pedarius is a species of scarab beetle in the subfamily Melolonthinae. It is found in Australia.

== Taxonomy ==
The species was first described by Thomas Blackburn in 1910 as Heteronyx pedarius. It was later transferred to the genus Acheilo by Everard Baldwin Britton in his 1988 synopsis of Australian Heteronycini.
