= Colobostoma =

Scientific classification
- Kingdom: Animalia
- Phylum: Arthropoda
- Clade: Pancrustacea
- Class: Insecta
- Order: Coleoptera
- Suborder: Polyphaga
- Infraorder: Scarabaeiformia
- Family: Scarabaeidae
- Subfamily: Sericoidinae
- Tribe: Liparetrini
- Genus: Colobostoma; Blanchard, 1850

Synonyms
- Pteroplatydesmus Dalla Torre, 1912; Platydesmus MacLeay, 1887

Genus of leaf beetles

Colobostoma is a genus of beetles belonging to the family Scarabaeidae.

== Species ==
- Colobostoma castaneus (Lea, 1919)
- Colobostoma hirsuta (Frey, 1966)
- Colobostoma inamoenus (Blackburn, 1907)
- Colobostoma inusitatus (Blackburn, 1907)
- Colobostoma major (Blackburn, 1907)
- Colobostoma obscuricornis (Blanchard, 1850)
- Colobostoma punctulaticeps (Blackburn, 1908)
- Colobostoma rufipennis (Boisduval, 1835)
