= Nepytis =

Scientific classification
- Kingdom: Animalia
- Phylum: Arthropoda
- Class: Insecta
- Order: Coleoptera
- Suborder: Polyphaga
- Infraorder: Scarabaeiformia
- Family: Scarabaeidae
- Subfamily: Sericoidinae
- Tribe: Heteronychini
- Genus: Nepytis; Erichson, 1842
- Species: N. russula

Binomial name
- Nepytis russula Erichson, 1842

Genus of beetles

Nepytis is a genus of beetle of the family Scarabaeidae. It is monotypic, being represented by the single species, Nepytis russula, which is found in Australia (Tasmania).

== Description ==
Adults reach a length of about 7 mm. The upper surface of the clypeus and anterior part of the frons have a few long, erect setae and the pronotum has two setae on the anterior margin on each side. All striae on the elytra are slightly impressed and the surface is coarsely punctured. The punctures have minute seta.
