= Eurychelus =

Scientific classification
- Kingdom: Animalia
- Phylum: Arthropoda
- Clade: Pancrustacea
- Class: Insecta
- Order: Coleoptera
- Suborder: Polyphaga
- Infraorder: Scarabaeiformia
- Family: Scarabaeidae
- Subfamily: Sericoidinae
- Tribe: Heteronychini
- Genus: Eurychelus; Blanchard, 1850
- Species: E. marmoratus

Binomial name
- Eurychelus marmoratus Blanchard, 1850

Genus of beetles

Eurychelus is a genus of beetle of the family Scarabaeidae. It is monotypic, being represented by the single species, Eurychelus marmoratus, which is found in the mountainous parts of Victoria and New South Wales.

== Description ==
Adults reach a length of about 8–11 mm. The frons and upper side of the clypeus are densely and uniformly clothed with pale, rather stout and pointed setae. The frons also has two long erect setae above each eye. The pronotum and elytra are densely and uniformly clothed with setae in small patches (some brown, some white). The pronotum also has two to four long erect yellow setae on the disc. The elytra are also clothed with setae like those on the pronotum.
