= Ictigaster =

Scientific classification
- Kingdom: Animalia
- Phylum: Arthropoda
- Clade: Pancrustacea
- Class: Insecta
- Order: Coleoptera
- Suborder: Polyphaga
- Infraorder: Scarabaeiformia
- Family: Scarabaeidae
- Subfamily: Sericoidinae
- Tribe: Liparetrini
- Genus: Ictigaster; Britton, 1986
- Species: I. ruficollis

Binomial name
- Ictigaster ruficollis (Lea, 1917)

Synonyms
- Haplonycha ruficollis Lea, 1917

Genus of beetles

Ictigaster is a genus of beetle of the family Scarabaeidae. It is monotypic, being represented by the single species, Ictigaster ruficollis, which is found in Australia (South Australia).

== Description ==
Adults reach a length of about 17 mm (0.67 in). The head, pronotum, scutellum, ventral surface of thorax and pygidium are bright reddish brown. The scutellum is densely punctured at the sides, with a median unpunctured area.
