= Proborhinus =

Scientific classification
- Kingdom: Animalia
- Phylum: Arthropoda
- Class: Insecta
- Order: Coleoptera
- Suborder: Polyphaga
- Infraorder: Scarabaeiformia
- Family: Scarabaeidae
- Subfamily: Sericoidinae
- Tribe: Heteronychini
- Genus: Proborhinus; Britton, 1988
- Species: P. cornutus

Binomial name
- Proborhinus cornutus (Blackburn, 1910)

Synonyms
- Heteronyx cornutus Blackburn, 1910

Genus of beetles

Proborhinus is a genus of beetle of the family Scarabaeidae. It is monotypic, being represented by the single species, Proborhinus cornutus, which is found in Australia (Western Australia).

== Description ==
Adults reach a length of about 4-5 mm. They are uniform pale testaceous. The pronotum and elytra are coarsely punctured, with uniform short pubescence.
