= Ovomanonychus =

Scientific classification
- Kingdom: Animalia
- Phylum: Arthropoda
- Class: Insecta
- Order: Coleoptera
- Suborder: Polyphaga
- Infraorder: Scarabaeiformia
- Family: Scarabaeidae
- Subfamily: Sericoidinae
- Tribe: Sericoidini
- Genus: Ovomanonychus; Costa, Cherman & Iannuzzi, 2020

Genus of leaf beetles

Ovomanonychus is a genus of beetles belonging to the family Scarabaeidae.

== Species ==
- Ovomanonychus inajae Costa, Cherman & Iannuzzi, 2020
- Ovomanonychus rosettae (Frey, 1976)
- Ovomanonychus striatus Costa, Cherman & Iannuzzi, 2020
