= Thinorycter chorasmius =

Scientific classification
- Kingdom: Animalia
- Phylum: Arthropoda
- Clade: Pancrustacea
- Class: Insecta
- Order: Coleoptera
- Suborder: Polyphaga
- Infraorder: Scarabaeiformia
- Family: Scarabaeidae
- Genus: Thinorycter
- Species: T. chorasmius

Binomial name
- Thinorycter chorasmius Semenov & Medvedev, 1929

Species of beetle

Thinorycter chorasmius is a species of beetle of the family Scarabaeidae. It is found in Turkmenistan.

== Description ==
Adults reach a length of about 3.3 mm (0.13 in). They are very similar to Thinorycter redikortzevi, both in coloration and in the shape of the body.
