= Manonychus =

Scientific classification
- Kingdom: Animalia
- Phylum: Arthropoda
- Clade: Pancrustacea
- Class: Insecta
- Order: Coleoptera
- Suborder: Polyphaga
- Infraorder: Scarabaeiformia
- Family: Scarabaeidae
- Subfamily: Sericoidinae
- Tribe: Sericoidini
- Genus: Manonychus; Moser, 1919

Genus of leaf beetles

Manonychus is a genus of beetles belonging to the family Scarabaeidae.

== Species ==
- Manonychus birabeni Martinez, 1959
- Manonychus conipygus Frey, 1976
- Manonychus densicollis Frey, 1974
- Manonychus martinezi Frey, 1974
- Manonychus ovalis (Blanchard, 1851)
- Manonychus robustus (Burmeister, 1855)
- Manonychus rufinus (Blanchard, 1851)
- Manonychus unguicularis Moser, 1919
