= Cubidens =

Scientific classification
- Kingdom: Animalia
- Phylum: Arthropoda
- Clade: Pancrustacea
- Class: Insecta
- Order: Coleoptera
- Suborder: Polyphaga
- Infraorder: Scarabaeiformia
- Family: Scarabaeidae
- Subfamily: Sericoidinae
- Tribe: Heteronychini
- Genus: Cubidens; Britton, 1992
- Species: C. unguiculatus

Binomial name
- Cubidens unguiculatus (Burmeister, 1855)

Synonyms
- Paraheteronyx Britton, 1988 (preocc.); Heteronyx unguiculata Burmeister, 1855; Paraheteronyx unguiculata

Genus of beetles

Cubidens is a genus of beetle of the family Scarabaeidae. It is monotypic, being represented by the single species, Cubidens unguiculatus, which is found in Australia.

== Description ==
Adults reach a length of about 7–7.5 mm (0.28–0.30 in).
