= Acheilo capitalis =

Scientific classification
- Kingdom: Animalia
- Phylum: Arthropoda
- Clade: Pancrustacea
- Class: Insecta
- Order: Coleoptera
- Suborder: Polyphaga
- Infraorder: Scarabaeiformia
- Family: Scarabaeidae
- Genus: Acheilo
- Species: A. capitalis

Binomial name
- Acheilo capitalis (Thomas Blackburn, 1910)

Synonyms
- Heteronyx capitalis Blackburn, 1910

Species of scarab beetle

Acheilo capitalis is a species of scarab beetle in the subfamily Melolonthinae. It is found in Australia (Queensland).

== Taxonomy ==
The species was first described by Thomas Blackburn in 1910 as Heteronyx capitalis. It was later transferred to the genus Acheilo by Everard Baldwin Britton in his 1988 synopsis of Australian Heteronycini.
