= Microdoris =

Scientific classification
- Kingdom: Animalia
- Phylum: Arthropoda
- Class: Insecta
- Order: Coleoptera
- Suborder: Polyphaga
- Infraorder: Scarabaeiformia
- Family: Scarabaeidae
- Subfamily: Melolonthinae
- Tribe: Chasmatopterini
- Genus: Microdoris; Burmeister, 1844
- Species: M. aquilus

Binomial name
- Microdoris aquilus Burmeister, 1844

Genus of beetles

Microdoris is a genus of beetle of the family Scarabaeidae. It is monotypic, being represented by the single species, Microdoris aquilus, which is found in South Africa.

== Description ==
Adults reach a length of about 6 mm (0.24 in). The surface of the head is densely and coarsely punctate, with the vertex almost black, and with yellow hairs. The pronotum is very shiny, with scattered punctures and with long yellow setae at the sides. The scutellum is covered with yellow hairs. The elytra are shiny, brown, and with punctures set in irregular rows which bear appressed yellow bristly hairs. The underside, legs, antennae, and palpi are pale yellow, shiny and have scattered setae.
