= Leonotus =

Scientific classification
- Kingdom: Animalia
- Phylum: Arthropoda
- Clade: Pancrustacea
- Class: Insecta
- Order: Coleoptera
- Suborder: Polyphaga
- Infraorder: Scarabaeiformia
- Family: Scarabaeidae
- Subfamily: Sericoidinae
- Tribe: Liparetrini
- Genus: Leonotus; Britton, 1986
- Species: L. pilosicollis

Binomial name
- Leonotus pilosicollis (Lea, 1930)

Synonyms
- Haplonycha pilosicollis Lea, 1930

Genus of beetles

Leonotus is a monotypic genus of beetles in the family Scarabaeidae. It contains the single species Leonotus pilosicollis, which is found in Australia (South Australia).

== Description ==
Adults reach a length of about 14–17 mm (0.55–0.67 in). They are uniform pale reddish brown. Males have dense, golden yellow hairs on the head, pronotum and scutellum.
