= Acheilo =

Scientific classification
- Kingdom: Animalia
- Phylum: Arthropoda
- Class: Insecta
- Order: Coleoptera
- Suborder: Polyphaga
- Infraorder: Scarabaeiformia
- Family: Scarabaeidae
- Subfamily: Sericoidinae
- Tribe: Heteronychini
- Genus: Acheilo; Britton, 1988

Genus of leaf beetles

Acheilo is a genus of beetles belonging to the family Scarabaeidae.

== Species ==
- Acheilo capitalis (Blackburn, 1910)
- Acheilo clypeatus Britton, 1988
- Acheilo pedarius (Blackburn, 1910)
