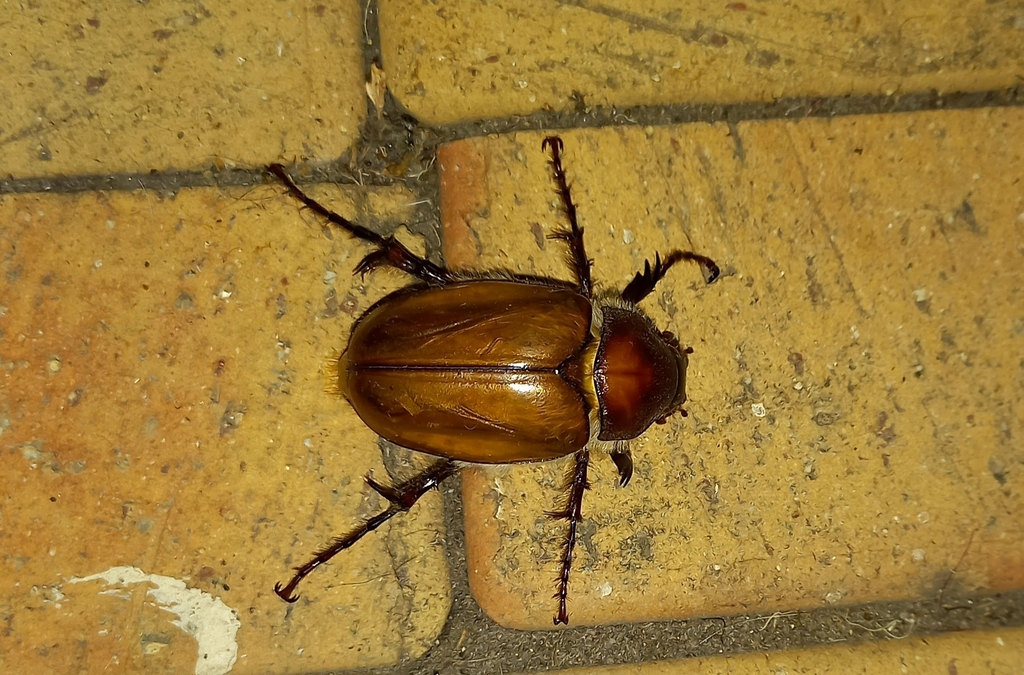

Scientific classification
- Kingdom: Animalia
- Phylum: Arthropoda
- Clade: Pancrustacea
- Class: Insecta
- Order: Coleoptera
- Suborder: Polyphaga
- Infraorder: Scarabaeiformia
- Family: Scarabaeidae
- Genus: Pachytricha
- Species: P. tecta

Binomial name
- Pachytricha tecta Sharp, 1875

= Pachytricha tecta =

Species of beetle

Pachytricha tecta is a species of beetle of the family Scarabaeidae. It is found in Australia (Western Australia).

== Description ==
Adults reach a length of about 26–37 mm (1.0–1.5 in). The head is dark reddish-brown, the pronotum has the centre of the disc brown, but is dark reddish-brown around the lateral and anterior margins. In some specimens, almost all of the pronotum is dark reddish-brown. The elytra, pygidium and ventral surface are yellowish-brown, and sometimes suffused with dark brown. The legs are brown.
