= Hybalus =

Scientific classification
- Kingdom: Animalia
- Phylum: Arthropoda
- Clade: Pancrustacea
- Class: Insecta
- Order: Coleoptera
- Suborder: Polyphaga
- Infraorder: Scarabaeiformia
- Family: Scarabaeidae
- Subfamily: Orphninae
- Tribe: Orphnini
- Genus: Hybalus; Dejean, 1833

Synonyms
- Geobius Brullé, 1832

Genus of beetles

Hybalus is a genus of beetles belonging to the family Scarabaeidae.

== Species ==
- Hybalus algiricus Petrovitz, 1968
- Hybalus alonsoi López-Colón & Bahillo de la Puebla, 2014
- Hybalus ameliae López-Colón, 1986
- Hybalus angustatus Lucas, 1855
- Hybalus arenicola Baraud, 1991
- Hybalus atlanticus López-Colón, 1991
- Hybalus baguenae López-Colón, 1986
- Hybalus barbarus (Laporte, 1840)
- Hybalus baudoni Petrovitz, 1964
- Hybalus bellmanni Frolov, Akhmetova & Montreuil, 2019
- Hybalus benoiti Tournier, 1864
- Hybalus bigibber Reitter, 1892
- Hybalus bletoni Baraud, 1991
- Hybalus constantini Baraud, 1979
- Hybalus cornifrons (Brullé, 1832)
- Hybalus digitatus Petrovitz, 1963
- Hybalus dorcas (Fabricius, 1798)
- Hybalus doursi Lucas, 1853
- Hybalus glabratus (Fabricius, 1792)
- Hybalus granicornis Fairmaire, 1879
- Hybalus kocheri Petrovitz, 1964
- Hybalus maroccanus Petrovitz, 1964
- Hybalus normandi Baraud, 1980
- Hybalus numidicus Petrovitz, 1964
- Hybalus parvicornis Lucas, 1855
- Hybalus petrovitzi Baraud, 1991
- Hybalus punicus Baraud, 1991
- Hybalus pygmaeus (Quensel, 1806)
- Hybalus ramicornis Reitter, 1892
- Hybalus reflexus Petrovitz, 1964
- Hybalus rotroui Petrovitz, 1964
- Hybalus saezi López-Colón, 1992
- Hybalus servulus Normand, 1949
- Hybalus subcornutus Fairmaire, 1870
- Hybalus sulcatus Baraud, 1991
- Hybalus tricornis (Lucas, 1846)
- Hybalus tuberculicornis Reitter, 1892
- Hybalus varians Petrovitz, 1964
