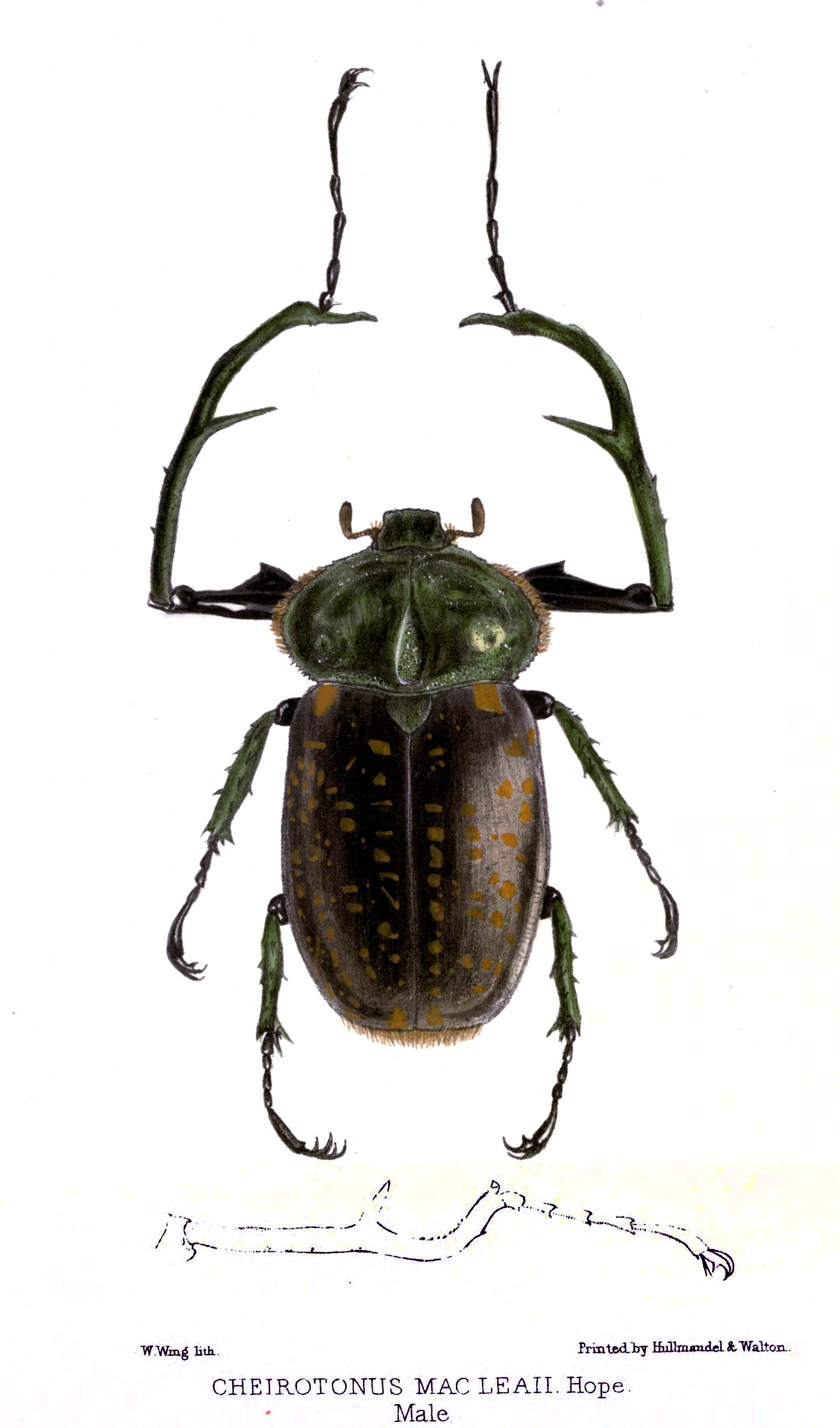
- Historical illustration of Cheirotonus formosanus (originally described as C. macleayi)

Scientific classification
- Kingdom: Animalia
- Phylum: Arthropoda
- Clade: Pancrustacea
- Class: Insecta
- Order: Coleoptera
- Suborder: Polyphaga
- Infraorder: Scarabaeiformia
- Family: Scarabaeidae
- Genus: Cheirotonus
- Species: C. formosanus

Binomial name
- Cheirotonus formosanus Ohaus, 1913

= Cheirotonus formosanus =

Species of beetle

Cheirotonus formosanus is a species of long-armed scarab beetle in the subfamily Euchirinae. It is endemic to Taiwan and inhabits montane forests.

== Genomics ==
A chromosome-level genome assembly of Cheirotonus formosanus was published in 2026, representing the first reference genome for the species. The genome is approximately 600.9 Mb in size and comprises 10 chromosomes. The assembly has a BUSCO completeness of 99.3% and contains 12,736 predicted protein-coding genes.
