= Thinorycter redikortzevi =

Scientific classification
- Kingdom: Animalia
- Phylum: Arthropoda
- Clade: Pancrustacea
- Class: Insecta
- Order: Coleoptera
- Suborder: Polyphaga
- Infraorder: Scarabaeiformia
- Family: Scarabaeidae
- Genus: Thinorycter
- Species: T. redikortzevi

Binomial name
- Thinorycter redikortzevi Kieseritzky & Reichardt, 1927

Species of beetle

Thinorycter redikortzevi is a species of beetle of the family Scarabaeidae. It is found in Turkmenistan.

== Description ==
Adults reach a length of about 2.9–3 mm (0.11–0.12 in). Their coloration is very similar to Thinorycter chlamydatus, but the body is more slender, and only moderately widened toward the rear.
