= Acheilo clypeatus =

Scientific classification
- Kingdom: Animalia
- Phylum: Arthropoda
- Class: Insecta
- Order: Coleoptera
- Suborder: Polyphaga
- Infraorder: Scarabaeiformia
- Family: Scarabaeidae
- Genus: Acheilo
- Species: A. clypeatus

Binomial name
- Acheilo clypeatus Britton, 1988

Species of beetle

Acheilo clypeatus is a species of beetle of the family Scarabaeidae. It is found in Australia (Western Australia).

== Description ==
Adults reach a length of about 4–6 mm. The have an uniformly testaceous body. The upper surface of the frons, as well as the pronotum and elytra are densely and uniformly setose.
