= Manonychus robustus =

Scientific classification
- Kingdom: Animalia
- Phylum: Arthropoda
- Class: Insecta
- Order: Coleoptera
- Suborder: Polyphaga
- Infraorder: Scarabaeiformia
- Family: Scarabaeidae
- Genus: Manonychus
- Species: M. robustus

Binomial name
- Manonychus robustus (Burmeister, 1855)

Synonyms
- Astaena robusta Burmeister, 1855

Species of beetle

Manonychus robustus is a species of beetle of the family Scarabaeidae. It is found in northern Brazil.

== Description ==
Adults reach a length of about 11 mm. They have a very broad and stout body. The clypeus is densely and coarsely evenly punctate. The back of the head and pronotum are more finely and sparsely punctate. The elytra is evenly punctate without discernible striae.
