= Phyllotocidium pictum =

Scientific classification
- Kingdom: Animalia
- Phylum: Arthropoda
- Clade: Pancrustacea
- Class: Insecta
- Order: Coleoptera
- Suborder: Polyphaga
- Infraorder: Scarabaeiformia
- Family: Scarabaeidae
- Genus: Phyllotocidium
- Species: P. pictum

Binomial name
- Phyllotocidium pictum Lea, 1916

Species of beetle

Phyllotocidium pictum is a species of beetle of the family Scarabaeidae. It is found in Australia (Western Australia).

== Description ==
Adults reach a length of about 5–5.25 mm (0.197–0.207 in). The head (except for the black labrum), pronotum (except for the narrowly flavous margins) and scutellum are dark metallic-green, while the elytra are flavous, with the suture, margins, base (narrowly) and apex purplish. The underside and pygidium are black, with a purplish gloss. The antennae, palpi and legs (although the tibiae are more or less green) are flavous. The underside and legs have rather long white or whitish hairs, and a few similar hairs are found on the sides of the pronotum and elytra.
