= Hybalus alonsoi =

Scientific classification
- Kingdom: Animalia
- Phylum: Arthropoda
- Clade: Pancrustacea
- Class: Insecta
- Order: Coleoptera
- Suborder: Polyphaga
- Infraorder: Scarabaeiformia
- Family: Scarabaeidae
- Genus: Hybalus
- Species: H. alonsoi

Binomial name
- Hybalus alonsoi López-Colón & Bahillo de la Puebla, 2014

Species of beetle

Hybalus alonsoi is a species of beetle of the family Scarabaeidae. It is found in Spain.

== Description ==
Adults reach a length of about 9.9 mm (0.39 in). They have a very broad, stout, and convex body. The elytra have evenly rounded sides. They are entirely black in colour, with a glossy head, pronotum, and elytra. Males possess a large, long clypeal horn that slopes backward.

== Etymology ==
The species is named in honour of Miguel Ángel Alonso Zarazaga.
