= Manonychus conipygus =

Scientific classification
- Kingdom: Animalia
- Phylum: Arthropoda
- Class: Insecta
- Order: Coleoptera
- Suborder: Polyphaga
- Infraorder: Scarabaeiformia
- Family: Scarabaeidae
- Genus: Manonychus
- Species: M. conipygus

Binomial name
- Manonychus conipygus Frey, 1976

Species of beetle

Manonychus conipygus is a species of beetle of the family Scarabaeidae. It is found in Brazil (Bahia).

== Description ==
Adults reach a length of about 10–11 mm. The upper and lower surfaces are shiny light brown, the upper surface glabrous and the underside only sparsely haired on the thorax. Both the elytra and pronotum are finely punctate. The antennae are light brown.
