= Ovomanonychus inajae =

Scientific classification
- Kingdom: Animalia
- Phylum: Arthropoda
- Class: Insecta
- Order: Coleoptera
- Suborder: Polyphaga
- Infraorder: Scarabaeiformia
- Family: Scarabaeidae
- Genus: Ovomanonychus
- Species: O. inajae

Binomial name
- Ovomanonychus inajae Costa, Cherman & Iannuzzi, 2020

Species of beetle

Ovomanonychus inajae is a species of beetle of the family Scarabaeidae. It is found in Brazil (Mato Grosso).

== Description ==
Adults reach a length of about 10.2 mm. They have a shiny, light reddish brown head. There are four longitudinal costae on the elytra.

== Etymology ==
The species is named after Mrs. Inajá Correia Costa, mother of the first author.
