= Pachytricha demarzi =

Scientific classification
- Kingdom: Animalia
- Phylum: Arthropoda
- Clade: Pancrustacea
- Class: Insecta
- Order: Coleoptera
- Suborder: Polyphaga
- Infraorder: Scarabaeiformia
- Family: Scarabaeidae
- Genus: Pachytricha
- Species: P. demarzi

Binomial name
- Pachytricha demarzi Frey, 1966

Species of beetle

Pachytricha demarzi is a species of beetle of the family Scarabaeidae. It is found in Australia (Western Australia).

== Description ==
Adults reach a length of about 23–25 mm (0.91–0.98 in). The upper and lower surfaces are blackish-brown and moderately glossy. The upper surface is smooth, while the underside is densely whitish-haired, but the ventral segments are only sparsely haired. The antennae are brown and the legs are blackish-brown.
