= Ovomanonychus rosettae =

Scientific classification
- Kingdom: Animalia
- Phylum: Arthropoda
- Class: Insecta
- Order: Coleoptera
- Suborder: Polyphaga
- Infraorder: Scarabaeiformia
- Family: Scarabaeidae
- Genus: Ovomanonychus
- Species: O. rosettae

Binomial name
- Ovomanonychus rosettae (Frey, 1976)

Synonyms
- Manonychus rosettae Frey, 1976

Species of beetle

Ovomanonychus rosettae is a species of beetle of the family Scarabaeidae. It is found in Brazil (Bahia, Espírito Santo, Minas Gerais).

== Description ==
Adults reach a length of about 11.2-12 mm. They have a shiny, light reddish brown head. There are four longitudinal costae on the elytra.
