= Pachytricha castanea =

Scientific classification
- Kingdom: Animalia
- Phylum: Arthropoda
- Clade: Pancrustacea
- Class: Insecta
- Order: Coleoptera
- Suborder: Polyphaga
- Infraorder: Scarabaeiformia
- Family: Scarabaeidae
- Genus: Pachytricha
- Species: P. castanea

Binomial name
- Pachytricha castanea Hope, 1841

Synonyms
- Pachytricha munda Sharp, 1875; Pachytricha pallens Sharp, 1875

Species of beetle

Pachytricha castanea is a species of beetle of the family Scarabaeidae. It is found in Australia (Western Australia).

== Description ==
Adults reach a length of about 28–34 mm (1.1–1.3 in). The head, pronotum, scutellum, pygidium, ventral surface and legs are dark reddish-brown, while the elytra are yellowish-brown to reddish-brown.
