= Oncerus =

Scientific classification
- Kingdom: Animalia
- Phylum: Arthropoda
- Class: Insecta
- Order: Coleoptera
- Suborder: Polyphaga
- Infraorder: Scarabaeiformia
- Family: Scarabaeidae
- Subfamily: Oncerinae
- Genus: Oncerus; LeConte, 1856

Genus of beetles

Oncerus is a genus of May beetles and junebugs in the family Scarabaeidae. There is one described species in Oncerus, O. floralis.
