= Ovomanonychus striatus =

Scientific classification
- Kingdom: Animalia
- Phylum: Arthropoda
- Class: Insecta
- Order: Coleoptera
- Suborder: Polyphaga
- Infraorder: Scarabaeiformia
- Family: Scarabaeidae
- Genus: Ovomanonychus
- Species: O. striatus

Binomial name
- Ovomanonychus striatus Costa, Cherman & Iannuzzi, 2020

Species of beetle

Ovomanonychus striatus is a species of beetle of the family Scarabaeidae. It is found in Brazil (Minas Gerais, Paraná, Rio de Janeiro, São Paulo).

== Description ==
Adults reach a length of about 10.5–12.1 mm. They have a shiny, reddish brown head. There are six longitudinal costae on the elytra.

== Etymology ==
The species name is derived from Latin striatus (meaning furrowed or striated) and refers to the ridges of the elytra.
