= Manonychus unguicularis =

Scientific classification
- Kingdom: Animalia
- Phylum: Arthropoda
- Clade: Pancrustacea
- Class: Insecta
- Order: Coleoptera
- Suborder: Polyphaga
- Infraorder: Scarabaeiformia
- Family: Scarabaeidae
- Genus: Manonychus
- Species: M. unguicularis

Binomial name
- Manonychus unguicularis Moser, 1919

Species of beetle

Manonychus unguicularis is a species of beetle of the family Scarabaeidae. It is found in Brazil (Mato Grosso).

== Description ==
Adults reach a length of about 12–14 mm. They are reddish-brown and shiny. The head is densely punctate, the clypeus rounded with a weakly upturned margin. The pronotum is twice as wide as long, the bristle-bearing lateral margins are curved, the anterior angles are somewhat projecting, the obtuse posterior angles are shortly rounded, and the anterior margin is slightly projecting in the middle. The surface is moderately densely punctate. The scutellum is more or less densely covered with punctures. On the elytra, the punctation is moderately dense and the ribs are not discernible. The pygidium is sparsely and rather finely punctate.
