= Colobostoma hirsuta =

Scientific classification
- Kingdom: Animalia
- Phylum: Arthropoda
- Clade: Pancrustacea
- Class: Insecta
- Order: Coleoptera
- Suborder: Polyphaga
- Infraorder: Scarabaeiformia
- Family: Scarabaeidae
- Genus: Colobostoma
- Species: C. hirsuta

Binomial name
- Colobostoma hirsuta (Frey, 1966)

Synonyms
- Frenchella hirsuta Frey, 1966

Species of beetle

Colobostoma hirsuta is a species of beetle of the family Scarabaeidae. It is found in Australia (Queensland).

== Description ==
Adults reach a length of about 9–14 mm. The upper and lower surfaces are moderately glossy and reddish-brown, with the tibiae, tarsi and clypeus darkened. The head has somewhat shorter, while the rest of the upper surface has long, erect reddish hairs, which are somewhat sparsely distributed. The underside is more densely and equally long-haired and the pygidium and elytra are pubescent.
