= Pachytricha minor =

Scientific classification
- Kingdom: Animalia
- Phylum: Arthropoda
- Clade: Pancrustacea
- Class: Insecta
- Order: Coleoptera
- Suborder: Polyphaga
- Infraorder: Scarabaeiformia
- Family: Scarabaeidae
- Genus: Pachytricha
- Species: P. minor

Binomial name
- Pachytricha minor Sharp, 1875

Species of beetle

Pachytricha minor is a species of beetle of the family Scarabaeidae. It is found in Australia (Western Australia).

== Description ==
Adults reach a length of about 21–23 mm (0.83–0.91 in). The head is dark brown, while the pronotum, pygidium and ventral surface are yellowish-brown to brown and the elytra yellowish-brown, sometimes suffused with reddish-brown. The legs are brown.
