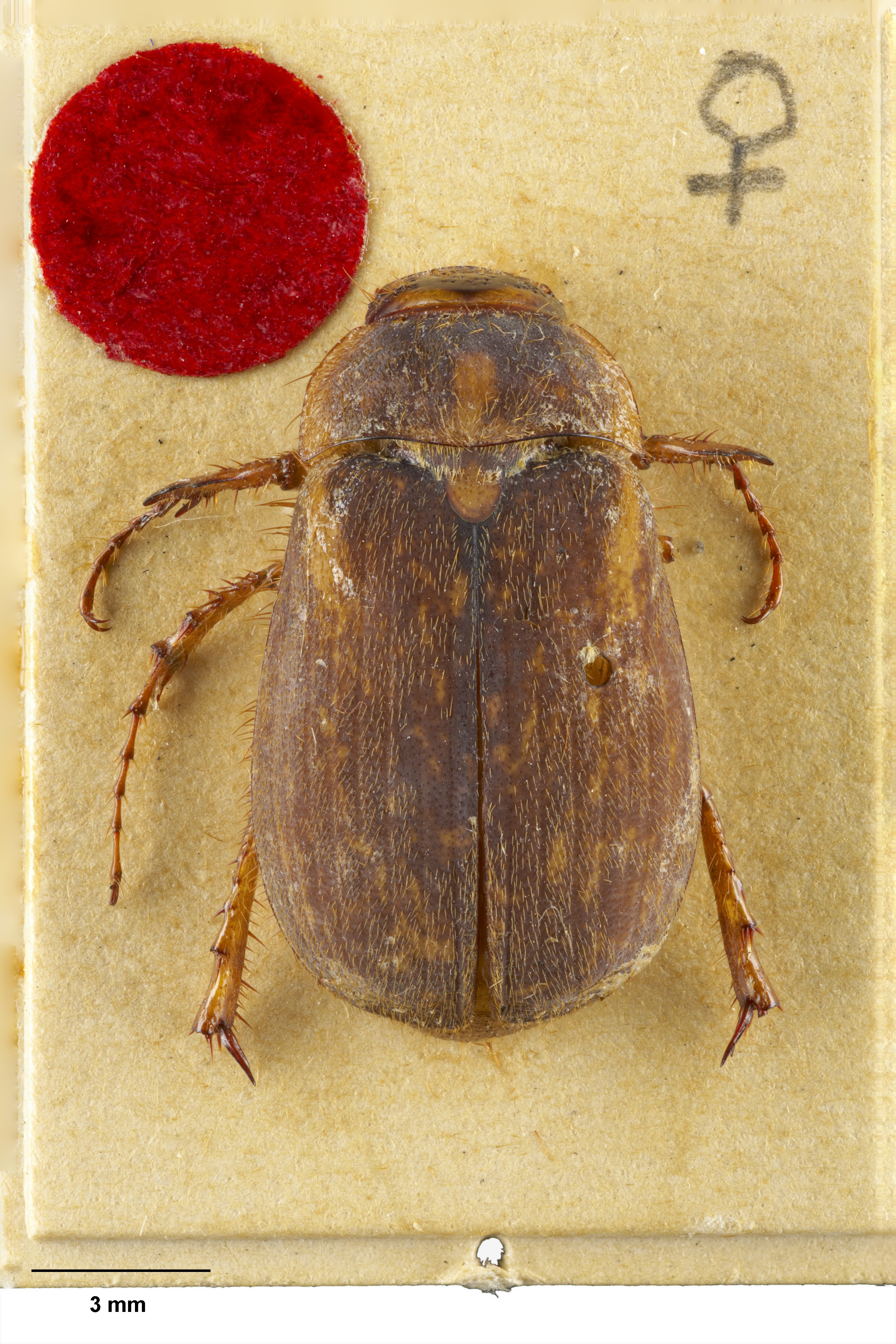
- Holotype of Odontria occiputale

Scientific classification
- Kingdom: Animalia
- Phylum: Arthropoda
- Clade: Pancrustacea
- Class: Insecta
- Order: Coleoptera
- Suborder: Polyphaga
- Infraorder: Scarabaeiformia
- Family: Scarabaeidae
- Subfamily: Sericoidinae
- Tribe: Liparetrini
- Genus: Odontria; White, 1846

= Odontria =

Genus of beetle

Odontria is a genus of beetle of the family Scarabaeidae.

== Taxonomy ==
Odontria contains the following species:

- Odontria decepta
- Odontria carinata
- Odontria aureopilosa
- Odontria australis
- Odontria cassiniae
- Odontria albonotata
- Odontria nesobia
- Odontria variegata
- Odontria cinnamomea
- Odontria smithii
- Odontria inconspicua
- Odontria halli
- Odontria varicolorata
- Odontria autumnalis
- Odontria rufescens
- Odontria macrothoracica
- Odontria communis
- Odontria convexa
- Odontria giveni
- Odontria marmorata
- Odontria monticola
- Odontria nitidula
- Odontria obscura
- Odontria obsoleta
- Odontria occiputale
- Odontria velutina
- Odontria fusca
- Odontria magnum
- Odontria sandageri
- Odontria borealis
- Odontria subnitida
- Odontria sylvatica
- Odontria aurantia
- Odontria suavis
- Odontria regalis
- Odontria xanthosticta
- Odontria magna
- Odontria striata
