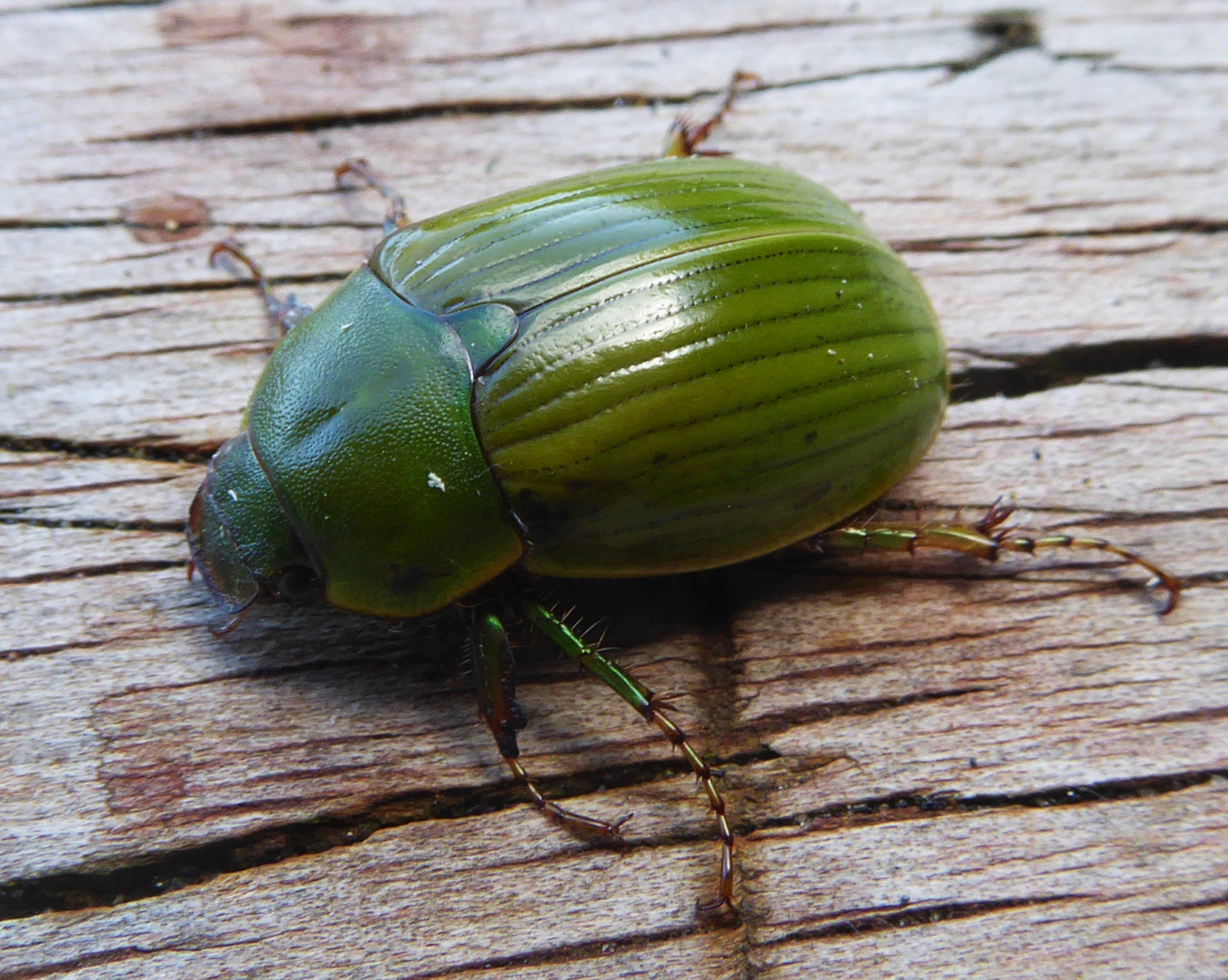
- Stethaspis longicornis

Scientific classification
- Kingdom: Animalia
- Phylum: Arthropoda
- Clade: Pancrustacea
- Class: Insecta
- Order: Coleoptera
- Suborder: Polyphaga
- Infraorder: Scarabaeiformia
- Family: Scarabaeidae
- Subfamily: Melolonthinae
- Genus: Stethaspis; Hope, 1837

= Stethaspis =

Genus of beetles

Stethaspis is a genus of beetles in the family Scarabaeidae, subfamily Sericoidinae.

== Description ==
Like other Melolonthinae, adult Stethaspis are oval and robust in shape. The antennae are relatively short and have the last few segments flattened and finger-like. The elytra leave the end of the abdomen exposed. Stethaspis are green in colour and range from 13 to 24 mm in length.

Larvae are creamy white with a prominent head, relatively large legs and a darkened posterior end (this darkening is due to the gut contents showing through the body wall). The body is curled up into a C-shape. When mature, Stethaspis larvae can be up to 45 mm long.

== Ecology ==
Similar to other melolonthines, Stethaspis beetles feed on plant foliage as adults and plant roots as larvae. Adults are known to damage Douglas fir.

Larvae of S. longicornis are eaten by Polynesian rats. Additionally, Stethaspis larvae are potential hosts for the introduced scoliid wasp Radumeris tasmaniensis, an ectoparasitoid of scarab larvae.

== Life cycle ==
Stethaspis follow the usual beetle life cycle of egg, larva, pupa and adult. The life cycle takes two years. Adults emerge en masse in summer.

== Species ==
Stethaspis contains the following species:

- Stethaspis convexa
- Stethaspis discoidea
- Stethaspis intermediata
- Stethaspis lineata
- Stethaspis longicornis
- Stethaspis prasinus
- Stethaspis pulchra
- Stethaspis simmondsi
- Stethaspis suturalis

== Gallery ==
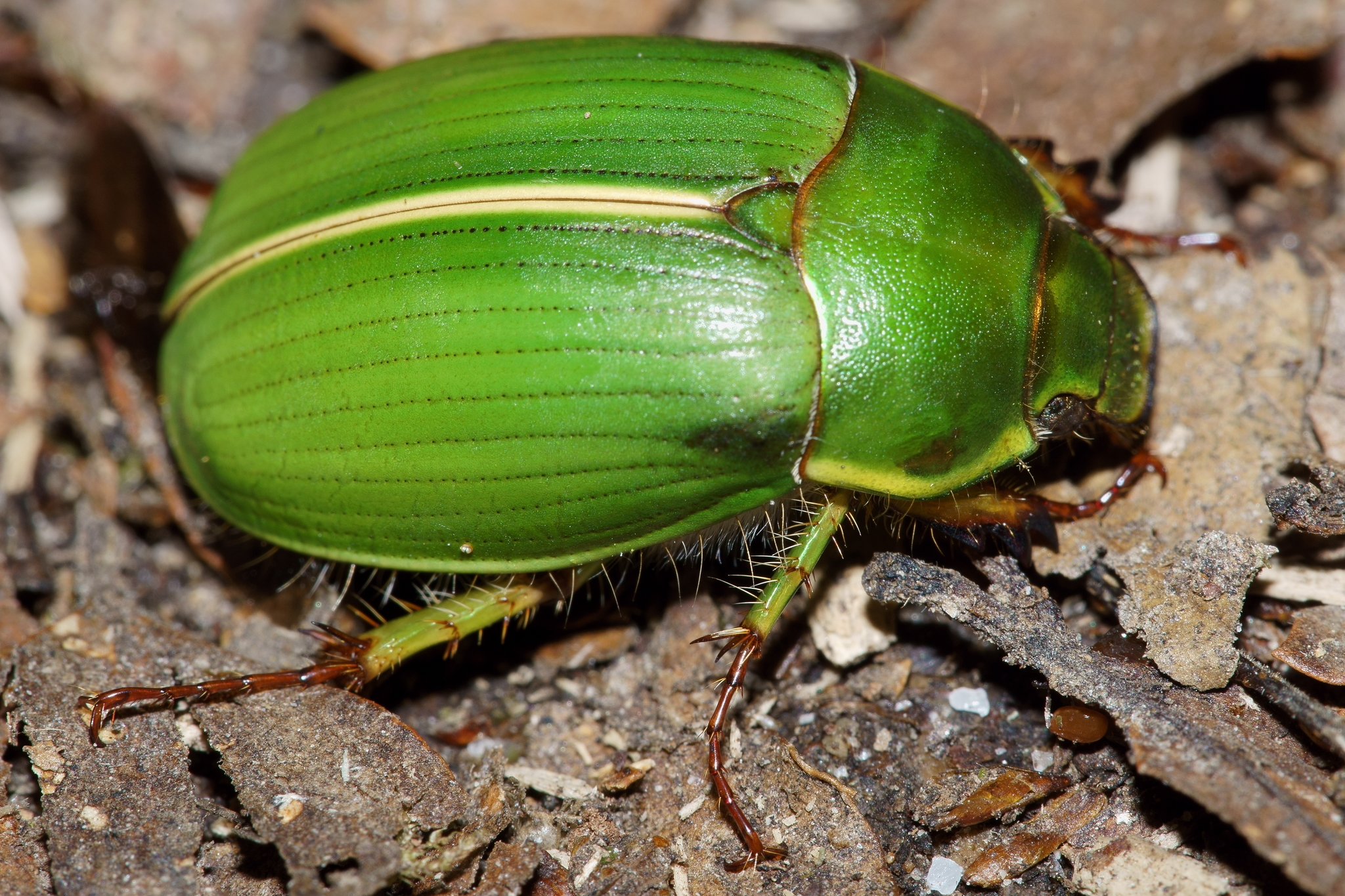
Stethaspis suturalis

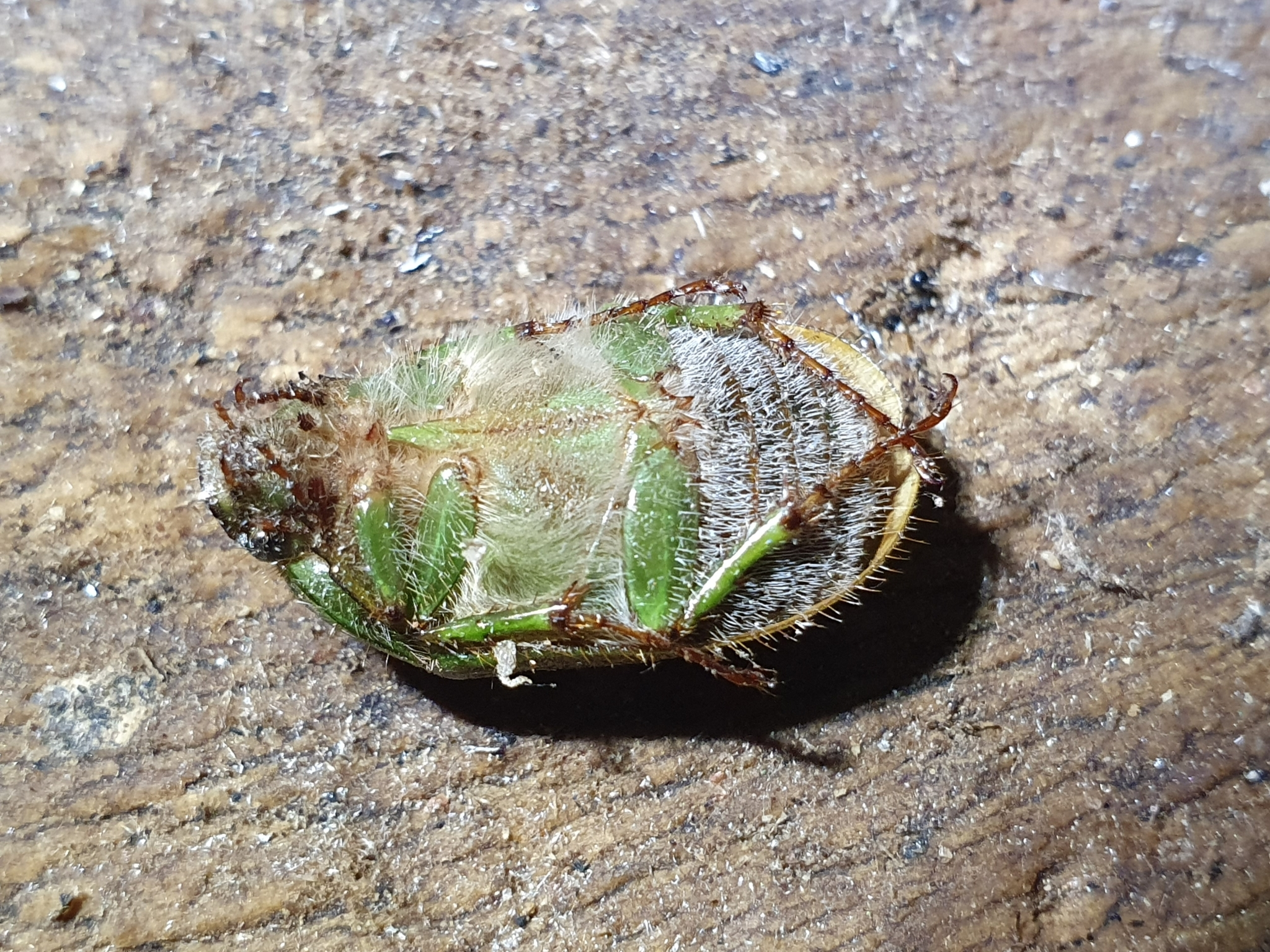
Underside of a different S. suturalis
