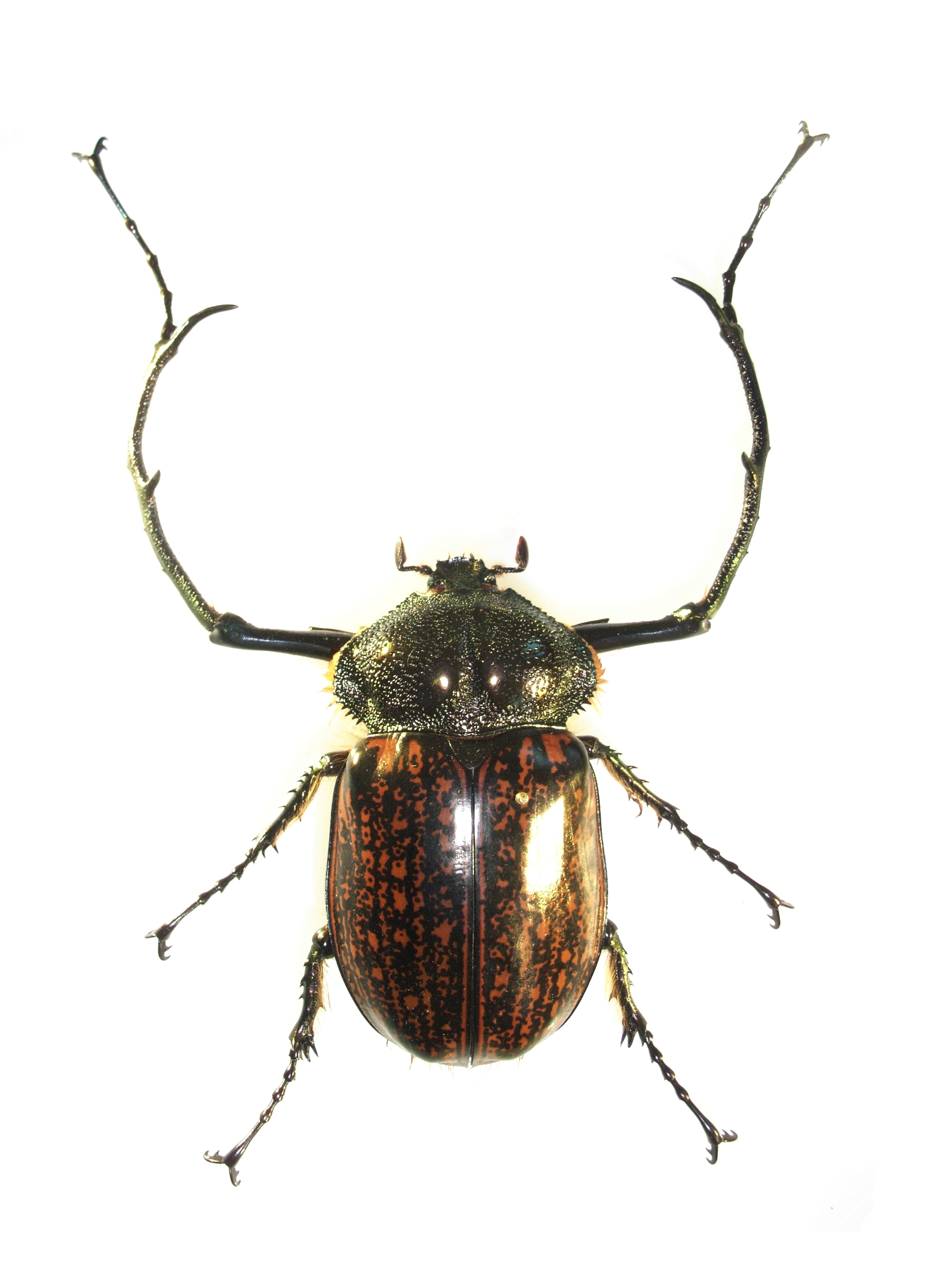
- Cheirotonus macleayi (male)

Scientific classification
- Kingdom: Animalia
- Phylum: Arthropoda
- Clade: Pancrustacea
- Class: Insecta
- Order: Coleoptera
- Suborder: Polyphaga
- Infraorder: Scarabaeiformia
- Family: Scarabaeidae
- Subfamily: Euchirinae
- Genus: Cheirotonus; Hope, 1841

= Cheirotonus =

Genus of beetles

Cheirotonus is a genus of long-armed scarabs (subfamily Euchirinae) with about 10 species with a distribution extending west along the Himalayas to Japan in the east. They live inside tree holes in montane forest and are attracted to lights. Males and females show differences in size and structure of the legs with males having elongated foretibiae. The pronotum is shiny green and the elytra are usually dark with orange patterning.

Eight to ten species, depending on the taxonomic treatment, are recognized:

- C. battareli Pouillaude 1913 - northern Vietnam
- C. formosanus Ohaus 1913 - Taiwan
- C. gestroi Pouillaude 1913 - Northeast India, Burma, Thailand, Vietnam
  - =corompti Pouillaude 1913
  - =henrici Pouillaude 1913
  - =chiangdaoensis Minet 1987
- C. jambar Kurosawa 1984 - North Okinawa
- C. jansoni (Jordan 1898) - Burma, China, Vietnam
  - = nankinensis Yu, 1936
  - = szetshuanus Medvedev, 1960
- C. macleayi Hope, 1841 - Bhutan, India, China
- C. parryii Gray, 1848 - Burma, India, Laos, Thailand
- C. peracanus Kriesche 1919 - Peninsular Malaysia
  - =arnaudi Minet 1981
- C. terunumai Muramoto 2008 - Tibet

== Genomics ==
A chromosome-level genome assembly of Cheirotonus formosanus was published in 2026, representing a high-quality reference genome for the genus. The genome is approximately 600.9 Mb in size and comprises 10 chromosomes. The assembly has a BUSCO completeness of 99.3% and contains 12,736 predicted protein-coding genes.
