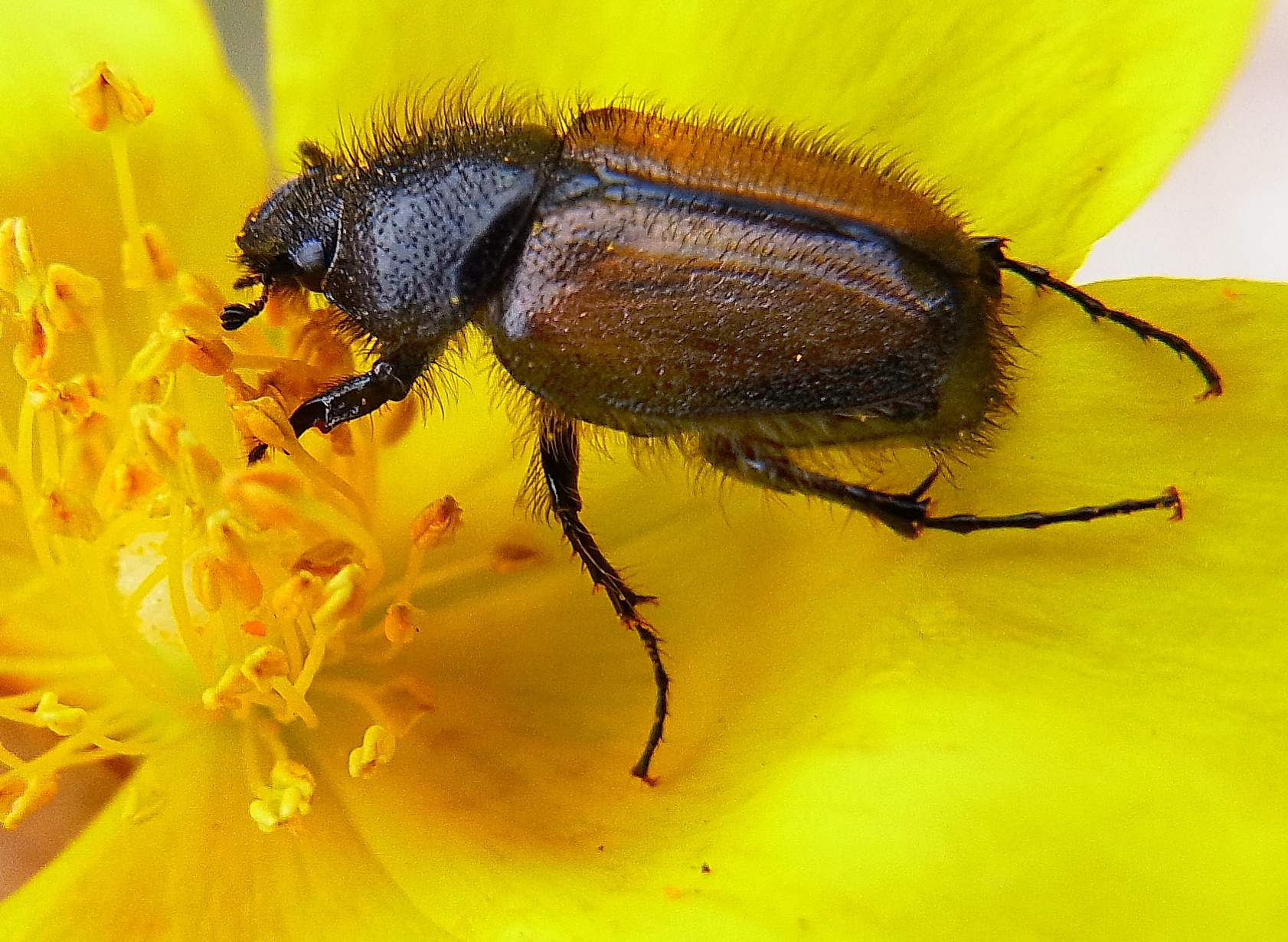

Scientific classification
- Kingdom: Animalia
- Phylum: Arthropoda
- Clade: Pancrustacea
- Class: Insecta
- Order: Coleoptera
- Suborder: Polyphaga
- Infraorder: Scarabaeiformia
- Family: Scarabaeidae
- Subfamily: Melolonthinae
- Tribe: Chasmatopterini; Lacordaire, 1855

Synonyms
- Chasmatopterina López-Colón, 2003; Chasmatopterini Reitter, 1898; Chasmatopterides Lacordaire, 1855; Glaphyridae Burmeister, 1844

= Chasmatopterini =

Tribe of beetles

Chasmatopterini is a tribe of scarab beetles in the family Scarabaeidae.

== Genera ==
The following genera are recognized in the tribe Chasmatopterini:

- Chasmatopterus Dejean, 1821
- Microdoris Burmeister, 1844
