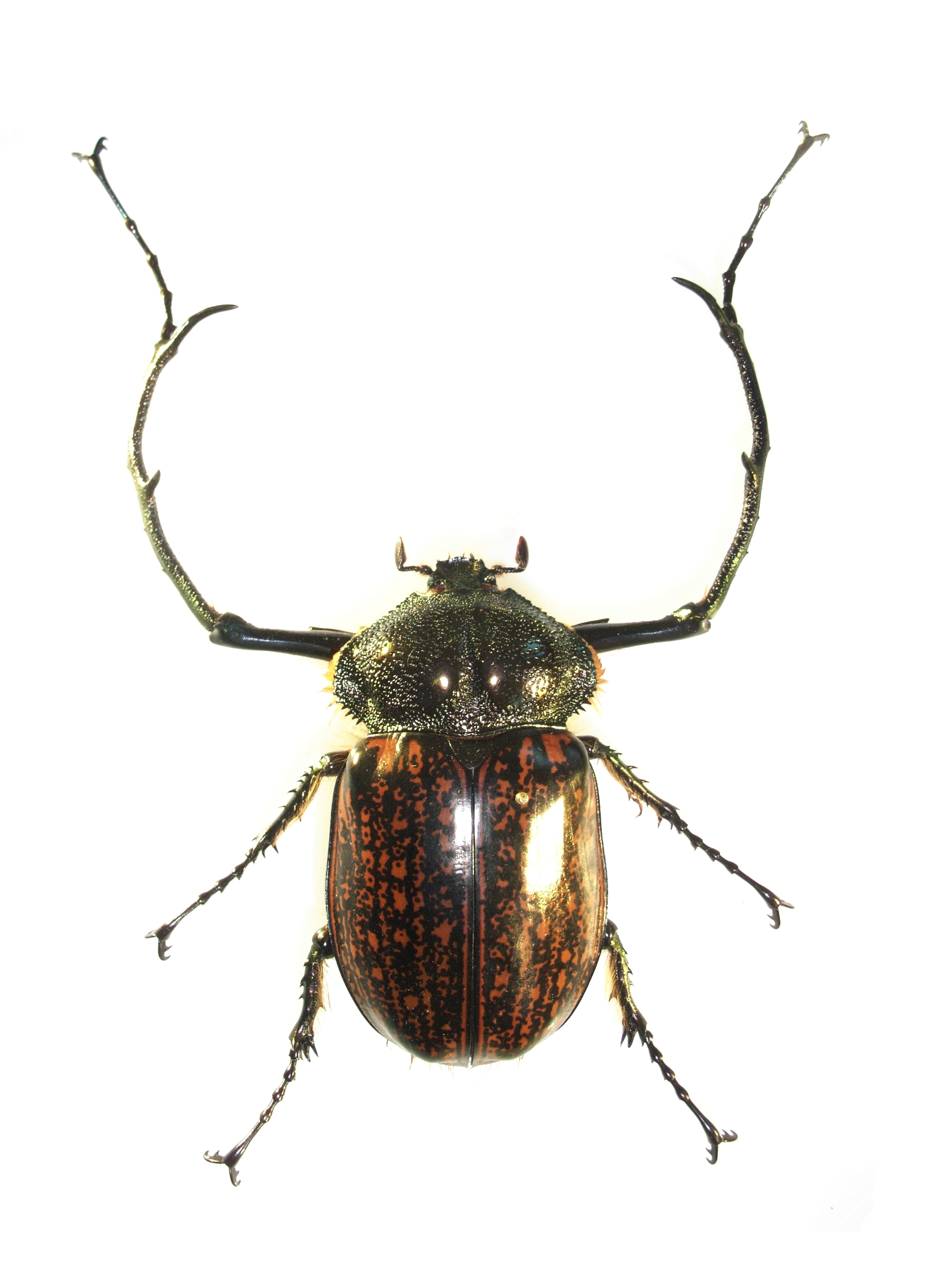
- Male Cheirotonus macleayi

Scientific classification
- Kingdom: Animalia
- Phylum: Arthropoda
- Clade: Pancrustacea
- Class: Insecta
- Order: Coleoptera
- Suborder: Polyphaga
- Infraorder: Scarabaeiformia
- Family: Scarabaeidae
- Subfamily: Euchirinae; Hope, 1840

Diversity
- 3 genera, 16 species

Synonyms
- Euchirini

= Euchirinae =

Subfamily of beetles

Euchirinae is a subfamily of Scarabaeidae or scarab beetles in the superfamily Scarabaeoidea. They are sometimes referred to as "long-armed scarabs" due to the elongated forelegs of the males. These long legs often have median and apical spines that are fixed in the male while females have a movable terminal spine.

They are sometimes included in subfamily Melolonthinae as tribe Euchirini.

== Genera and species ==
This subfamily contains 3 genera with 14 species: A 2024 study demonstrated that the name Propomacrus muramotoae Fujioka, 2007 was based on a specimen of P. bimucronatus that had been deliberately altered to change its appearance.

- Cheirotonus Hope, 1840 (10 species)
  - Cheirotonus battareli Pouillaude, 1913
  - Cheirotonus formosanus Ohaus, 1913
  - Cheirotonus fujiokai Muramoto, 1994
  - Cheirotonus gestroi Pouillaude, 1913
  - Cheirotonus jambar Kurosawa, 1984
  - Cheirotonus jansoni Jordan, 1898
  - Cheirotonus macleayi Hope, 1840
  - Cheirotonus parryi Gray, 1848
  - Cheirotonus peracanus Kriesche, 1919
  - Cheirotonus szetshuanus Medvedev, 1960
- Propomacrus Newman, 1837 (2 species)
  - Propomacrus bimucronatus bimucronatus Pallas, 1781
  - Propomacrus bimucronatus cypriacus Alexis & Makris 2002
  - Propomacrus davidi Deyrolle, 1874
- Euchirus Linnaeus, 1758 (2 species)
  - Euchirus dupontianus Burmeister, 1841
  - Euchirus longimanus Linnaeus, 1758

One fossil species C. otai has been described from Japan.
