= Thinorycter chlamydatus =

Scientific classification
- Kingdom: Animalia
- Phylum: Arthropoda
- Clade: Pancrustacea
- Class: Insecta
- Order: Coleoptera
- Suborder: Polyphaga
- Infraorder: Scarabaeiformia
- Family: Scarabaeidae
- Genus: Thinorycter
- Species: T. chlamydatus

Binomial name
- Thinorycter chlamydatus Semenov & Reichardt, 1925

Synonyms
- Thinorycter diamesus Semenov & Medvedev, 1928

Species of beetle

Thinorycter chlamydatus is a species of beetle of the family Scarabaeidae. It is found in Turkmenistan and Uzbekistan.

== Description ==
Adults reach a length of about 3–3.5 mm (0.12–0.14 in). They have a strongly convex, glossy, somewhat translucent, yellowish-brown body, with the elytra lighter straw-yellow.
