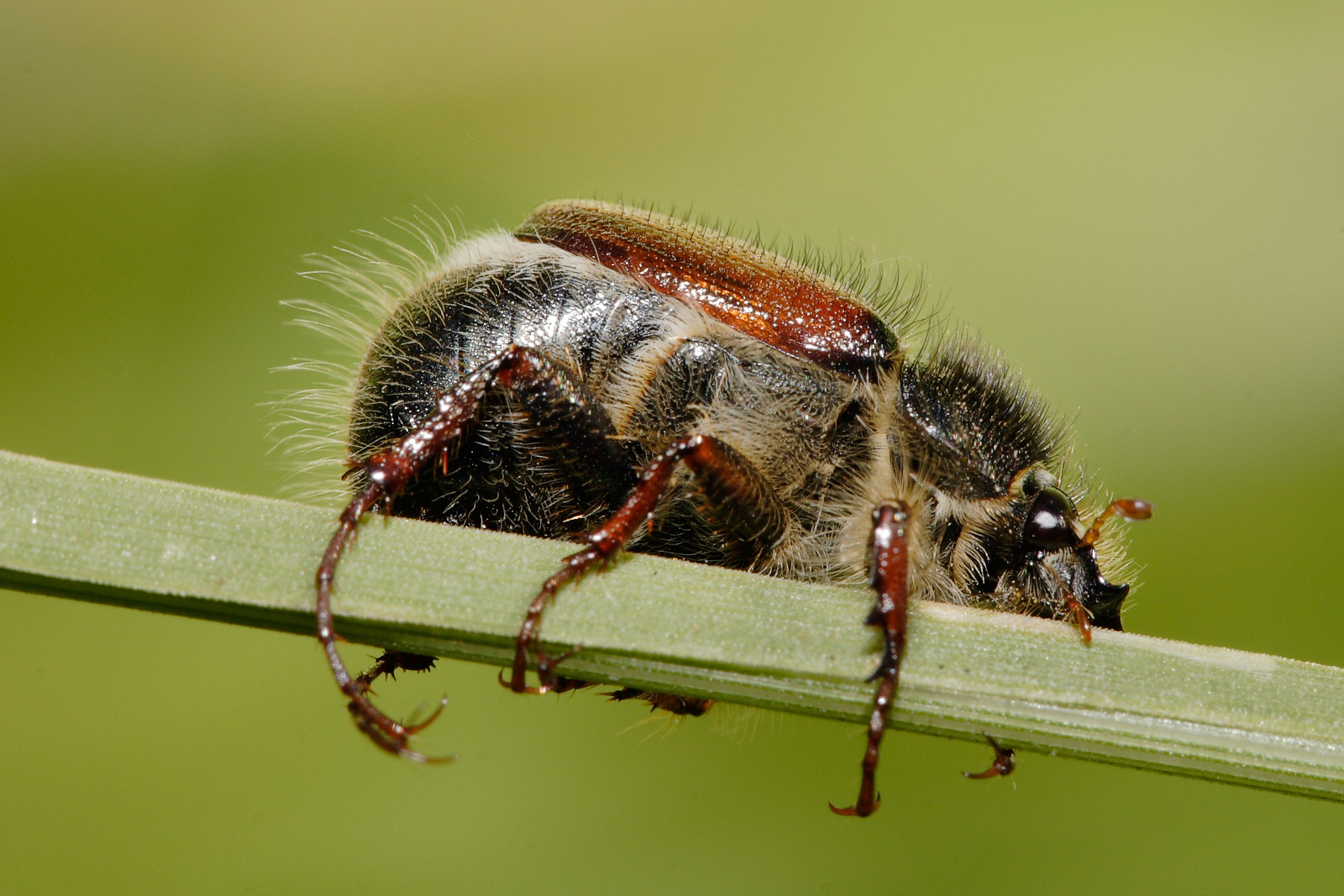
- Liparetrus sp.

Scientific classification
- Kingdom: Animalia
- Phylum: Arthropoda
- Clade: Pancrustacea
- Class: Insecta
- Order: Coleoptera
- Suborder: Polyphaga
- Infraorder: Scarabaeiformia
- Family: Scarabaeidae
- Subfamily: Sericoidinae
- Tribe: Liparetrini; Burmeister, 1855

Synonyms
- Colpochilini Britton, 1957; Hoplonychidae Burmeister, 1855; Liparetridae Burmeister, 1855; Maechidiina Burmeister, 1855; Pachytrichiadae Burmeister, 1855; Sericoidea Burmeister, 1855; Stethaspidiae Burmeister, 1855

= Liparetrini =

Tribe of scarab beetles

Liparetrini is a tribe of scarab beetles in the family Scarabaeidae.

== Taxonomy ==
Liparetrini contains the following genera:

- Allara Britton, 1955
- Anacanthodes Britton, 1990
- Aneucomides Blackburn, 1898
- Aphanesia Britton, 1990
- Astibicola Britton, 1990
- Biphyllocera White, 1841
- Cheilo Britton, 1990
- Colobostoma Blanchard, 1850
- Colpochila Erichson, 1843
- Costelytra Given, 1952
- Dikellites Britton, 1990
- Dysphanochila Blackburn, 1898
- Engyopsina Britton, 1990
- Evbrittonia Szito, 1993
- Frenchella Blackburn, 1892
- Glossocheilifer Blackburn, 1898
- Hadropechys Britton, 1990
- Ictigaster Britton, 1986
- Leonotus Britton, 1986
- Liparetrus Guérin-Méneville, 1830
- Lutfius Özdikmen, 2009
- Macleayella Britton, 1990
- Mycernus Broun, 1904
- Neso Blackburn, 1898
- Nosphisthis Blackburn, 1898
- Odontria White, 1846
- Pachygastra Germar, 1848
- Parasciton Britton, 1990
- Paronyx Britton, 1990
- Petinopus Blackburn, 1898
- Prodontria Broun, 1904
- Psilodontria Broun, 1895
- Pyronota Boisduval, 1835
- Scitaloides Britton, 1990
- Sciton Blackburn, 1892
- Scythrodes Broun, 1886
- Sericospilus Sharp, 1882
- Stenochelyne Britton, 1990
- Stethaspis Hope, 1837
- Teluroides Britton, 1990
- Xyridea Britton, 1990

== Former genera ==
- Telura
