= Comophorina =

Scientific classification
- Kingdom: Animalia
- Phylum: Arthropoda
- Clade: Pancrustacea
- Class: Insecta
- Order: Coleoptera
- Suborder: Polyphaga
- Infraorder: Scarabaeiformia
- Family: Scarabaeidae
- Subfamily: Melolonthinae
- Tribe: Comophini; Britton, 1978
- Genus: Comophorina; Strand, 1928
- Species: C. testaceipennis

Binomial name
- Comophorina testaceipennis (Blanchard, 1850)

Synonyms
- Comophorinini Britton, 1987; Comophorini Britton, 1957; Comophus Britton, 1978; Comophorus Blanchard, 1850; Comophorus testaceipennis Blanchard, 1850

Genus of beetles

Comophorina is a genus of scarab beetles in the family Scarabaeidae and only genus within the tribe Comophini. It only contains the species, Comophorina testaceipennis, which is found in New South Wales, Australia.

== Description ==
Adults reach a length of about 7–8 mm (0.28–0.31 in). The body is black, but the elytra are bright yellowish brown with the basal and lateral margins black. The antennae are yellowish, with a brown club. The palpi, anterior and middle tibiae and tarsi are yellowish brown and the hind legs are dark brown. There are long yellowish setae on the head, while the setae on the pronotum are brownish. The setae on the elytra are long at the base and short towards the apex.
