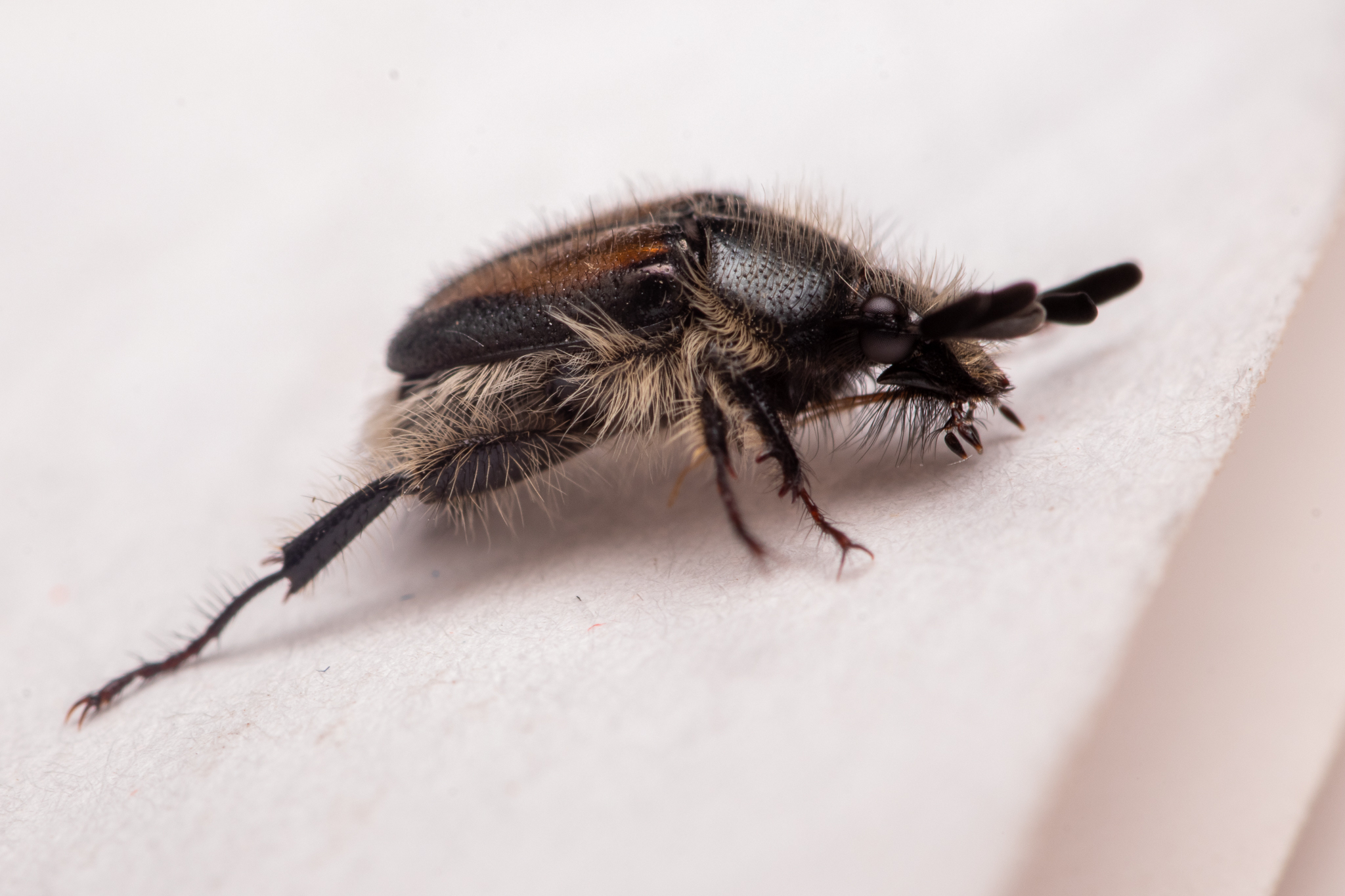
- Lichnia limbata, Chile

Scientific classification
- Domain: Eukaryota
- Kingdom: Animalia
- Phylum: Arthropoda
- Class: Insecta
- Order: Coleoptera
- Suborder: Polyphaga
- Infraorder: Scarabaeiformia
- Family: Scarabaeidae
- Subfamily: Lichniinae; Burmeister, 1844

= Lichniinae =

Subfamily of beetles

Lichniinae is a subfamily of scarab beetles in the family Scarabaeidae. The subfamily consists of two genera and about six described species. Lichniinae is sometimes considered a tribe of the subfamily Melolonthinae, Lichniini.

== Genera ==
These two genera belong to the subfamily Lichniinae:

Genus Arctodium Burmeister, 1844
Arctodium discolor (Erichson, 1835) – Chile
Arctodium mahdii Hawkins, 2006 – Chile
Arctodium planum (Blanchard, 1850) – Chile
Arctodium vulpinum (Erichson, 1835) – Chile
Genus Lichnia Erichson, 1835
Lichnia gallardoi Gutiérrez, 1943 – Chile
Lichnia limbata Erichson, 1835 – Chile, Peru
