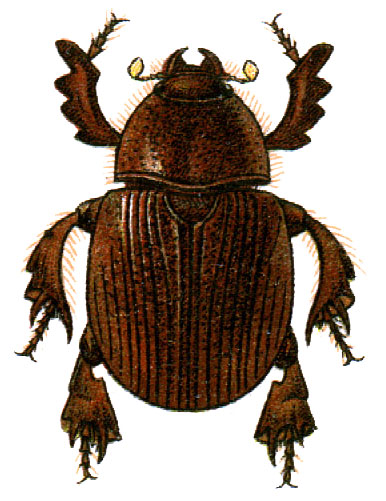
- Orubesa athleta

Scientific classification
- Kingdom: Animalia
- Phylum: Arthropoda
- Clade: Pancrustacea
- Class: Insecta
- Order: Coleoptera
- Suborder: Polyphaga
- Infraorder: Scarabaeiformia
- Family: Scarabaeidae
- Subfamily: Dynamopodinae; Arrow, 1911

Synonyms
- Dynamopus Semenov, 1895

= Dynamopodinae =

Subfamily of beetles

Dynamopodinae is a very small subfamily of Scarabaeidae or scarab beetles, with only twelve species in a three genera.

== Genera and Species ==
These tribes, genera and species belong to the subfamily Dynamopodinae:

- Tribe Dynamopodini
  - Genus Adraria Villiers, 1956
    - Adraria monodi Villiers, 1956 - Mauretania
  - Genus Orubesa Reitter, 1895
    - Orubesa ata (Semenov & Medvedev, 1929) - Iran
    - Orubesa athleta (Semenov, 1895) - Russia, India, Central Asia
    - Orubesa gladiator (Balthasar, 1968) - Afghanistan
    - Orubesa luctator (Semenov & Medvedev, 1929) - Iraq, Iran, Pakistan, India
    - Orubesa perforata Reitter, 1895 - Afghanistan, Iran
    - Orubesa plicifrons (Fairmaire, 1897) - Africa, Saudi Arabia
- Tribe Thinorycterini Semenov & Reichardt, 1925
