= Maechidiini =

Scientific classification
- Kingdom: Animalia
- Phylum: Arthropoda
- Class: Insecta
- Order: Coleoptera
- Suborder: Polyphaga
- Infraorder: Scarabaeiformia
- Family: Scarabaeidae
- Subfamily: Sericoidinae
- Tribe: Maechidiini; Burmeister, 1855

Tribe of beetles

Maechidiini is a tribe of May beetles and junebugs in the family Scarabaeidae.

== Genera ==
These genera belong to the tribe Maechidiini:

- Harpechys Britton, 1957
- Maechidius MacLeay, 1819
- Microcoenus Britton, 1957
- Microthopus Burmeister, 1855
- Termitophilus Britton, 1957
