= Aulonocneminae =

Scientific classification
- Domain: Eukaryota
- Kingdom: Animalia
- Phylum: Arthropoda
- Class: Insecta
- Order: Coleoptera
- Suborder: Polyphaga
- Infraorder: Scarabaeiformia
- Family: Scarabaeidae
- Subfamily: Aulonocneminae; Janssens, 1946

Subfamily of beetles

Aulonocneminae is a subfamily of scarab beetles in the family Scarabaeidae. There are about 5 genera and more than 50 described species in Aulonocneminae, found in Madagascar and east Asia.

== Genera ==
These five genera belong to the subfamily Aulonocneminae:

- Ankaratrotrox Paulian, 1954 (Madagascar)
- Aulonocnemis Klug, 1838 (Madagascar)
- Manjarivolo Paulian, 1974 (Madagascar)
- Palnia Stebnicka, 1985 (east Asia)
- † Protopalnia Nikolajev, 2007
