= Sericoidini =

Scientific classification
- Kingdom: Animalia
- Phylum: Arthropoda
- Class: Insecta
- Order: Coleoptera
- Suborder: Polyphaga
- Infraorder: Scarabaeiformia
- Family: Scarabaeidae
- Subfamily: Sericoidinae
- Tribe: Sericoidini; Erichson, 1847

Tribe of beetles

Sericoidini is a tribe of May beetles and junebugs in the family Scarabaeidae.

== Genera ==
These genera belong to the tribe Sericoidini:

- Apterodemidea Gutiérrez, 1952
- Blepharotoma Blanchard, 1850
- Manonychus Moser, 1919
- Ovomanonychus Costa, Cherman & Iannuzzi, 2020
- Sericoides Guérin-Méneville, 1839
- Zaburina Saylor, 1945
