= Oncerinae =

Scientific classification
- Kingdom: Animalia
- Phylum: Arthropoda
- Clade: Pancrustacea
- Class: Insecta
- Order: Coleoptera
- Suborder: Polyphaga
- Infraorder: Scarabaeiformia
- Family: Scarabaeidae
- Subfamily: Oncerinae; LeConte, 1861

Tribe of beetles

Oncerinae is a small subfamily of scarab beetles in the family Scarabaeidae. There are only two genera Oncerinae, each with a single species.

Oncerinae has been sometimes classified as a tribe of the subfamily Melolonthinae, "Oncerini".

== Genera ==
These two genera belong to the subfamily Oncerinae:

Genus Nefoncerus Saylor, 1938 - Neotropics
Nefoncerus convergens (Horn, 1894)
Genus Oncerus LeConte, 1856 - North America
Oncerus floralis LeConte, 1856
