= Prototrox =

Scientific classification
- Kingdom: Animalia
- Phylum: Arthropoda
- Class: Insecta
- Order: Coleoptera
- Suborder: Polyphaga
- Infraorder: Scarabaeiformia
- Family: Scarabaeidae
- Subfamily: †Prototroginae; Nikolajev, 2000
- Genus: †Prototrox; Nikolajev, 2000
- Species: †P. transbaikalicus

Binomial name
- †Prototrox transbaikalicus Nikolajev, 2000

Species of beetles

Prototrox transbaikalicus is an extinct, fossil species of hide beetle that lived in modern-day regions of Mongolia and Transbaikalia during the Lower Cretaceous. P. transbaikalicus is the only species of both the genus Prototrox and the subfamily Prototroginae.
