= Phyllotocidium =

Scientific classification
- Kingdom: Animalia
- Phylum: Arthropoda
- Clade: Pancrustacea
- Class: Insecta
- Order: Coleoptera
- Suborder: Polyphaga
- Infraorder: Scarabaeiformia
- Family: Scarabaeidae
- Tribe: Phyllotocidiini; Britton, 1957
- Genus: Phyllotocidium; Blackburn, 1898

Tribe of beetles

Phyllotocidiini is a tribe of scarab beetles in the family Scarabaeidae. It only contains the genus Phyllotocidium.

== Species ==
- Phyllotocidium bimaculiflavum Lea, 1917
- Phyllotocidium macleayi (Blackburn, 1892)
- Phyllotocidium pictum Lea, 1916
- Phyllotocidium viridis Britton, 1957
