= Heteronychini =

Scientific classification
- Kingdom: Animalia
- Phylum: Arthropoda
- Class: Insecta
- Order: Coleoptera
- Suborder: Polyphaga
- Infraorder: Scarabaeiformia
- Family: Scarabaeidae
- Subfamily: Sericoidinae
- Tribe: Heteronychini; Lacordaire, 1855

Synonyms
- Heteronycides Lacordaire, 1855

Tribe of beetles

Heteronychini is a tribe of May beetles and junebugs in the family Scarabaeidae.

== Genera ==
These genera belong to the tribe Heteronychini:

- Acheilo Britton, 1988
- Callabonica Blackburn, 1895
- Cubidens Britton, 1992
- Eurychelus Blanchard, 1850
- Heteronyx Guérin-Méneville, 1831
- Neoheteronyx Blackburn, 1890
- Nepytis Erichson, 1842
- Odontotonyx MacLeay, 1871
- Paraheteronyx Moser, 1924
- Proborhinus Britton, 1988
- Pseudoheteronyx Blackburn, 1892
- Webbella Britton, 1988
