= Automoliini =

Scientific classification
- Kingdom: Animalia
- Phylum: Arthropoda
- Class: Insecta
- Order: Coleoptera
- Suborder: Polyphaga
- Infraorder: Scarabaeiformia
- Family: Scarabaeidae
- Subfamily: Sericoidinae
- Tribe: Automoliini; Britton, 1978

Synonyms
- Automolini Britton, 1957; Caulobiina Burmeister, 1855

Tribe of beetles

Automoliini is a tribe of May beetles and junebugs in the family Scarabaeidae.

== Genera ==
These genera belong to the tribe Automoliini:

- Aplopsis Blanchard, 1850
- Automolius Britton, 1978
- Brittonius Özdikmen & Demir, 2008
- Deuterocaulobius Dalla Torre, 1912
- Maechidinus Lea, 1919
