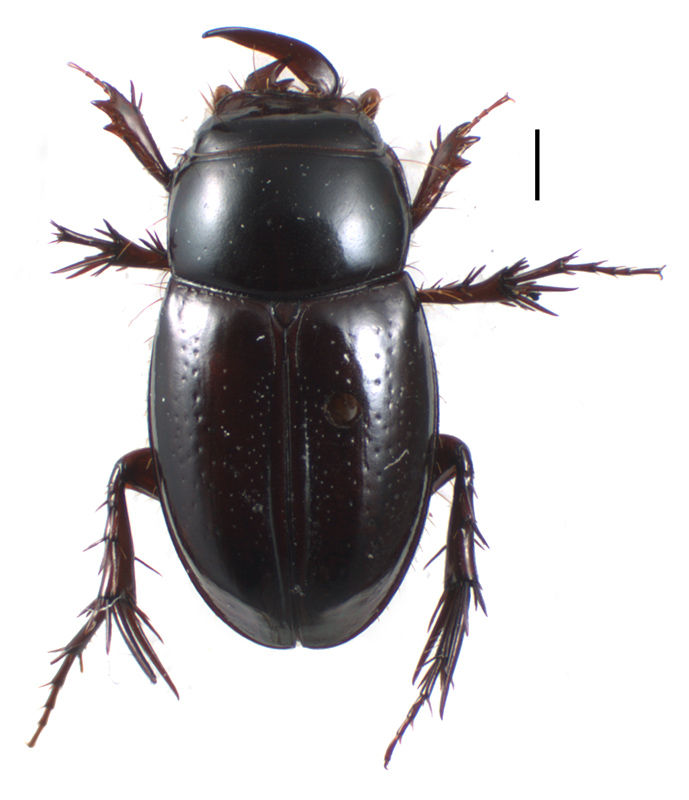
- Madecorphnus falcatus

Scientific classification
- Kingdom: Animalia
- Phylum: Arthropoda
- Clade: Pancrustacea
- Class: Insecta
- Order: Coleoptera
- Suborder: Polyphaga
- Infraorder: Scarabaeiformia
- Family: Scarabaeidae
- Subfamily: Orphninae; Erichson, 1847

Tribes
- See text

= Orphninae =

Subfamily of beetles

Orphninae is a subfamily of beetles in the scarab beetle family, Scarabaeidae. There are two tribes in the family, the New World Aegidiini and the Old World Orphnini. They are mostly tropical beetles.

As of 2013 there are about 195 species in the subfamily. They are classified in 15 genera: 4 in the tribe Aegidiini and 11 in the Orphnini. In addition, the genus Stenosternus is provisionally placed in the Aegidiini.

== Taxonomy ==
Taxa include:

- Tribe Aegidiini
  - Genus Aegidiellus
  - Genus Aegidium
  - Genus Aegidinus
  - Genus Paraegidium
  - Genus Stenosternus
- Tribe Orphnini
  - Genus Hybalus Dejean, 1833
  - Genus Madecorphnus
  - Genus Pseudorphnus
  - Genus Renorphnus
  - Genus Triodontus
