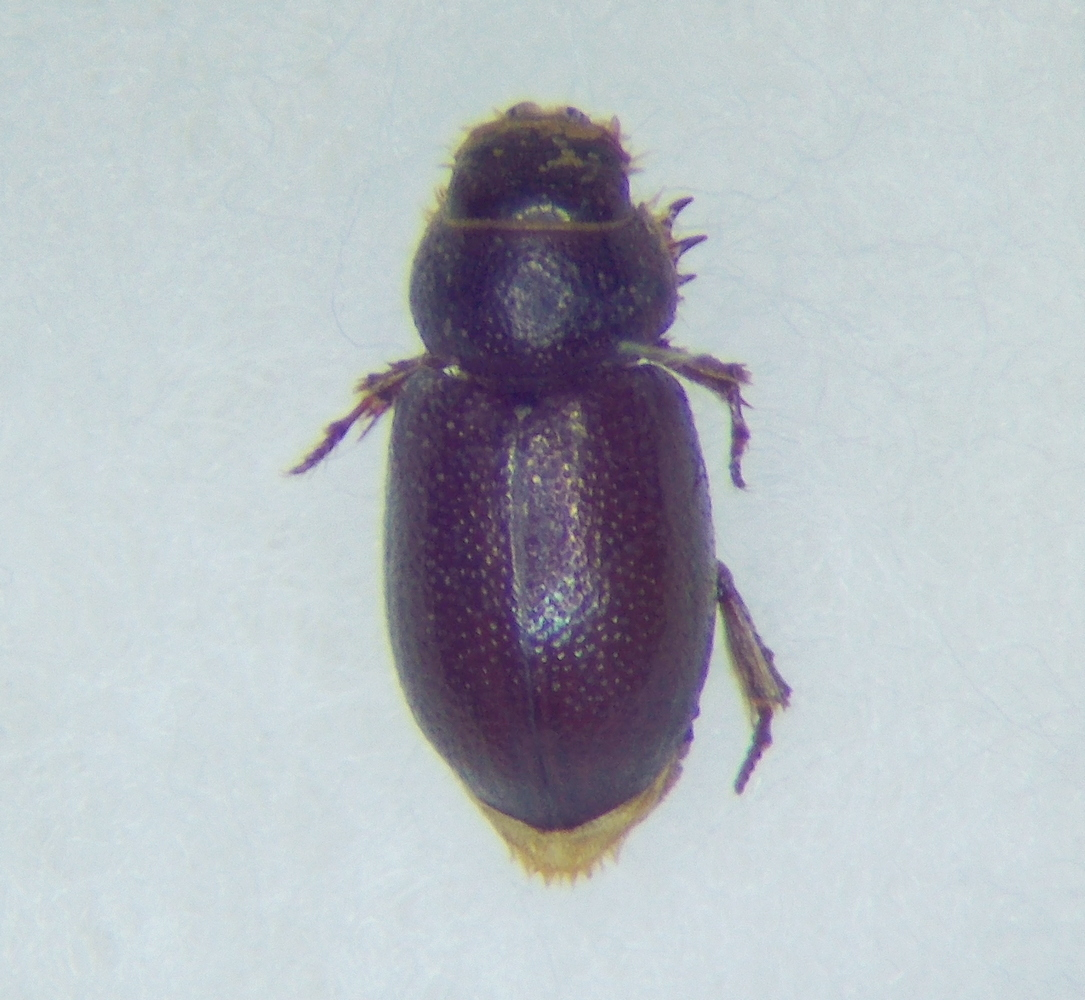
- Eremazus cribratus, Russia

Scientific classification
- Domain: Eukaryota
- Kingdom: Animalia
- Phylum: Arthropoda
- Class: Insecta
- Order: Coleoptera
- Suborder: Polyphaga
- Infraorder: Scarabaeiformia
- Family: Scarabaeidae
- Subfamily: Eremazinae; Stebnicka, 1977

= Eremazinae =

Subfamily of beetles

Eremazinae is a small subfamily of scarab beetles in the family Scarabaeidae. The subfamily consists of two genera, one extant and one extinct, and about eight described species.

== Genera ==
These two genera belong to the subfamily Eremazinae:

- Eremazus Mulsant, 1851 (Asia, Africa)
- † Yixianscarabaeus Nikolajev, 2015 (China)
