= Allidiostomatinae =

Scientific classification
- Kingdom: Animalia
- Phylum: Arthropoda
- Class: Insecta
- Order: Coleoptera
- Suborder: Polyphaga
- Infraorder: Scarabaeiformia
- Superfamily: Scarabaeoidea
- Family: Scarabaeidae
- Subfamily: Allidiostomatinae; Arrow, 1940

Type genus
- Allidiostoma Arrow, 1940

Genera
- Allidiostoma; Parallidiostoma

Synonyms
- Idiostomatinae Arrow, 1904

Subfamily of beetles

Allidiostomatinae is a subfamily of beetles in the scarab beetle family, Scarabaeidae. It is distributed in southern South America. Of the eleven species, seven are endemic to Argentina. Others can also be found in Chile and Peru. Little is known about the biology of these beetles.

The subfamily was made up of the single genus Allidiostoma until 2009, when a second was erected for the new species Parallidiostoma tricornum.

Genera and species include:

Genus Allidiostoma Arrow, 1940
Allidiostoma bosqui Gutiérrez, 1946 - Chile
Allidiostoma halffteri Martinez, 1956 - Argentina
Allidiostoma hirta (Ohaus, 1910) - Argentina
Allidiostoma landbecki (Philippi, 1873) - Chile, Argentina
Allidiostoma monrosmuntanolae Martinez, 1947 - Argentina
Allidiostoma porteri (Ruiz, 1924) - Chile
Allidiostoma ramosae Martinez, 1947 - Argentina
Allidiostoma rufum (Arrow, 1904) - Chile, Argentina
Allidiostoma simplicifrons (Fairmaire, 1885) - Peru, Chile
Allidiostoma strobeli (Steinheil, 1872) - Argentina
Genus Parallidiostoma Ocampo & Colby, 2009
Parallidiostoma tricornum Ocampo & Colby, 2009 - Peru
