= Pachytricha =

Scientific classification
- Kingdom: Animalia
- Phylum: Arthropoda
- Clade: Pancrustacea
- Class: Insecta
- Order: Coleoptera
- Suborder: Polyphaga
- Infraorder: Scarabaeiformia
- Family: Scarabaeidae
- Tribe: Pachytrichini; Burmeister, 1855
- Genus: Pachytricha; Hope, 1841

Tribe of beetles

Pachytrichini is a tribe of scarab beetles in the family Scarabaeidae. It only contains the genus Pachytricha.

== Species ==
- Pachytricha castanea Hope, 1841
- Pachytricha demarzi Frey, 1966
- Pachytricha minor Sharp, 1875
- Pachytricha robusta Sharp, 1875
- Pachytricha tecta Sharp, 1875
