= Thinorycter =

Scientific classification
- Kingdom: Animalia
- Phylum: Arthropoda
- Clade: Pancrustacea
- Class: Insecta
- Order: Coleoptera
- Suborder: Polyphaga
- Infraorder: Scarabaeiformia
- Family: Scarabaeidae
- Subfamily: Aphodiinae
- Tribe: Thinorycterini
- Genus: Thinorycter; Semenov & Reichardt, 1925

Genus of beetles

Thinorycter is a genus of scarab beetles in the family Scarabaeidae, the sole genus in the tribe Thinorycterini. There are five described species in Thinorycter, found in Turkmenistan, Uzbekistan, and Kazakhstan.

== Species ==
These five species belong to the genus Thinorycter:

- Thinorycter balthasari Medvedev, 1969 (Kazakhstan)
- Thinorycter chlamydatus Semenov & Reichardt, 1925 (Uzbekistan, Turkmenistan)
- Thinorycter chorasmius Semenov & Medvedev, 1929 (Turkmenistan)
- Thinorycter mamajevi Medvedev, 1969 (Turkmenistan, Uzbekistan, Kazakhstan)
- Thinorycter redikortzevi Kieseritzky & Reichardt, 1927 (Turkmenia)
