= Phyllotocini =

Scientific classification
- Kingdom: Animalia
- Phylum: Arthropoda
- Class: Insecta
- Order: Coleoptera
- Suborder: Polyphaga
- Infraorder: Scarabaeiformia
- Family: Scarabaeidae
- Subfamily: Sericoidinae
- Tribe: Phyllotocini; Burmeister, 1855

Synonyms
- Phyllotocidae Burmeister, 1855

Tribe of beetles

Phyllotocini is a tribe of may beetles in the family Scarabaeidae.

== Genera ==
These genera belong to the tribe Phyllotocini:

- Adossa Britton, 1995
- Ancylonyx Britton, 1957
- Anthotocus Britton, 1957
- Cheiragra MacLeay, 1864
- Cheirodontus Britton, 1957
- Cheirora Britton, 1957
- Neophyllotocus Blackburn, 1898
- Opsitocus Britton, 1957
- Phyllotocus Fischer von Waldheim, 1823
- Sphaeroscelis Burmeister, 1855
