= Sericoidinae =

Scientific classification
- Kingdom: Animalia
- Phylum: Arthropoda
- Clade: Pancrustacea
- Class: Insecta
- Order: Coleoptera
- Suborder: Polyphaga
- Infraorder: Scarabaeiformia
- Family: Scarabaeidae
- Subfamily: Sericoidinae; Erichson, 1847

Subfamily of beetles

Sericoidinae is a subfamily of the scarab beetles (family Scarabaeidae).

== Tribes ==
- Automoliini Britton, 1978
- Heteronychini Lacordaire, 1855
- Liparetrini Burmeister, 1855
- Maechidiini Burmeister, 1855
- Phyllotocini Burmeister, 1855
- Scitalini Britton, 1957
- Sericoidini Erichson, 1847
