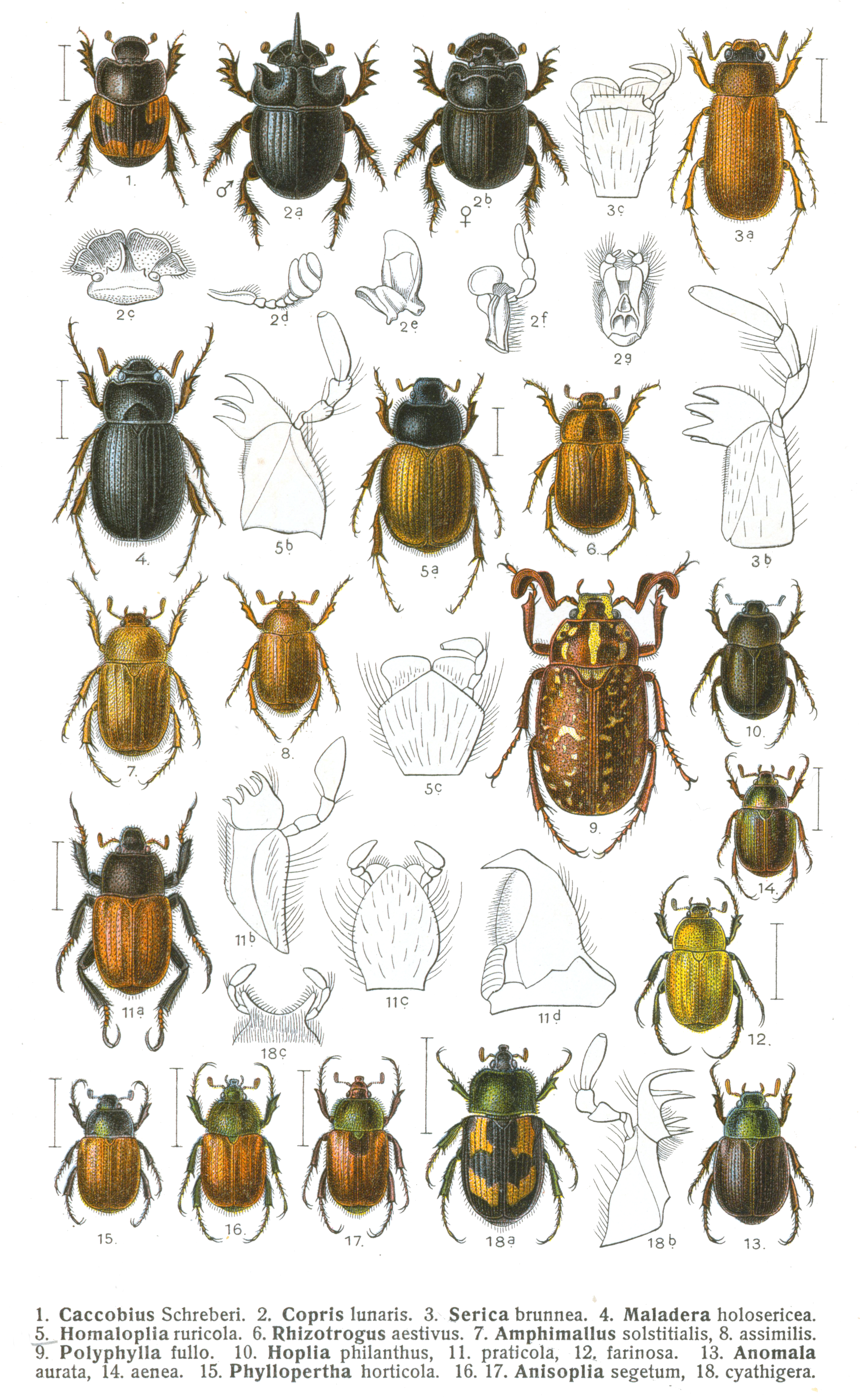
- Central European scarab beetles with some anatomical details. Edmund Reitter's Fauna Germanica, 1908

Scientific classification
- Kingdom: Animalia
- Phylum: Arthropoda
- Clade: Pancrustacea
- Class: Insecta
- Order: Coleoptera
- Suborder: Polyphaga
- Infraorder: Scarabaeiformia
- Superfamily: Scarabaeoidea
- Family: Scarabaeidae; Latreille, 1802

Subfamilies
- Aclopinae Blanchard, 1850; Aegialiinae Laporte, 1840; Allidiostomatinae Arrow, 1940; Aphodiinae Leach, 1815; Aulonocneminae Janssens, 1946; Cetoniinae Leach, 1815; Chironinae Blanchard, 1845; Dynamopodinae Arrow, 1911; Dynastinae MacLeay, 1819; Eremazinae Stebnicka, 1977; Lichniinae Burmeister, 1844; Melolonthinae MacLeay, 1819; Oncerinae LeConte, 1861; Orphninae Erichson, 1847; Phaenomeridinae Erichson, 1847; Rutelinae MacLeay, 1819; Scarabaeinae Latreille, 1802; Sericinae Kirby, 1837; Termitotroginae Wasmann, 1918; Trichiinae Kolbe, 1897; Valginae Schenkling, 1922; † Cretoscarabaeinae Nikolajev, 1995; † Electrorubesopsinae Bai & Wang, 2018; † Lithoscarabaeinae Nikolajev, 1992; † Prototroginae Nikolajev, 2000

= Scarabaeidae =

Scarab beetle

Family of beetles

The family Scarabaeidae, as currently defined, consists of over 35,000 species of beetles worldwide; they are often called scarabs or scarab beetles. The classification of this family has undergone significant change. Several groups formerly treated as subfamilies have been elevated to family rank (e.g., Bolboceratidae, Geotrupidae, Glaresidae, Glaphyridae, Hybosoridae, Ochodaeidae, and Pleocomidae), and some reduced to lower ranks. The subfamilies listed in this article are in accordance with those in Catalogue of Life (2023).

== Description ==
Scarabs are stout-bodied beetles; most are brown or black in colour, but many, generally species that are diurnally active, have bright metallic colours, measuring between 1.5 and 160 mm (0.059 and 6.3 in). The antennae of most species superficially seem to be knobbed (capitated), but the several segments comprising the head of the antenna are, as a rule, lamellate; they extend laterally into plates called lamellae that they usually keep compressed into a ball. Then, when following a scent, such a beetle fans the lamellae out like leaves to sense odours.

Many species are fossorial, with legs adapted for digging. In some groups, males (and sometimes females) have prominent horns on the head and/or pronotum to fight over mates or resources. The largest fossil scarabaeid was Oryctoantiquus borealis with a length of 50 mm (2.0 in).

The C-shaped larvae, called grubs, are pale yellow or white. Most adult beetles are nocturnal, although the flower chafers (Cetoniinae) and many leaf chafers (Rutelinae) are diurnal. The grubs mostly live underground or under debris, so they are not exposed to sunlight. Many scarabs are scavengers that recycle dung, carrion, or decaying plant material. Others, such as the Japanese beetle, are plant-eaters, wreaking havoc on various crops and vegetation.

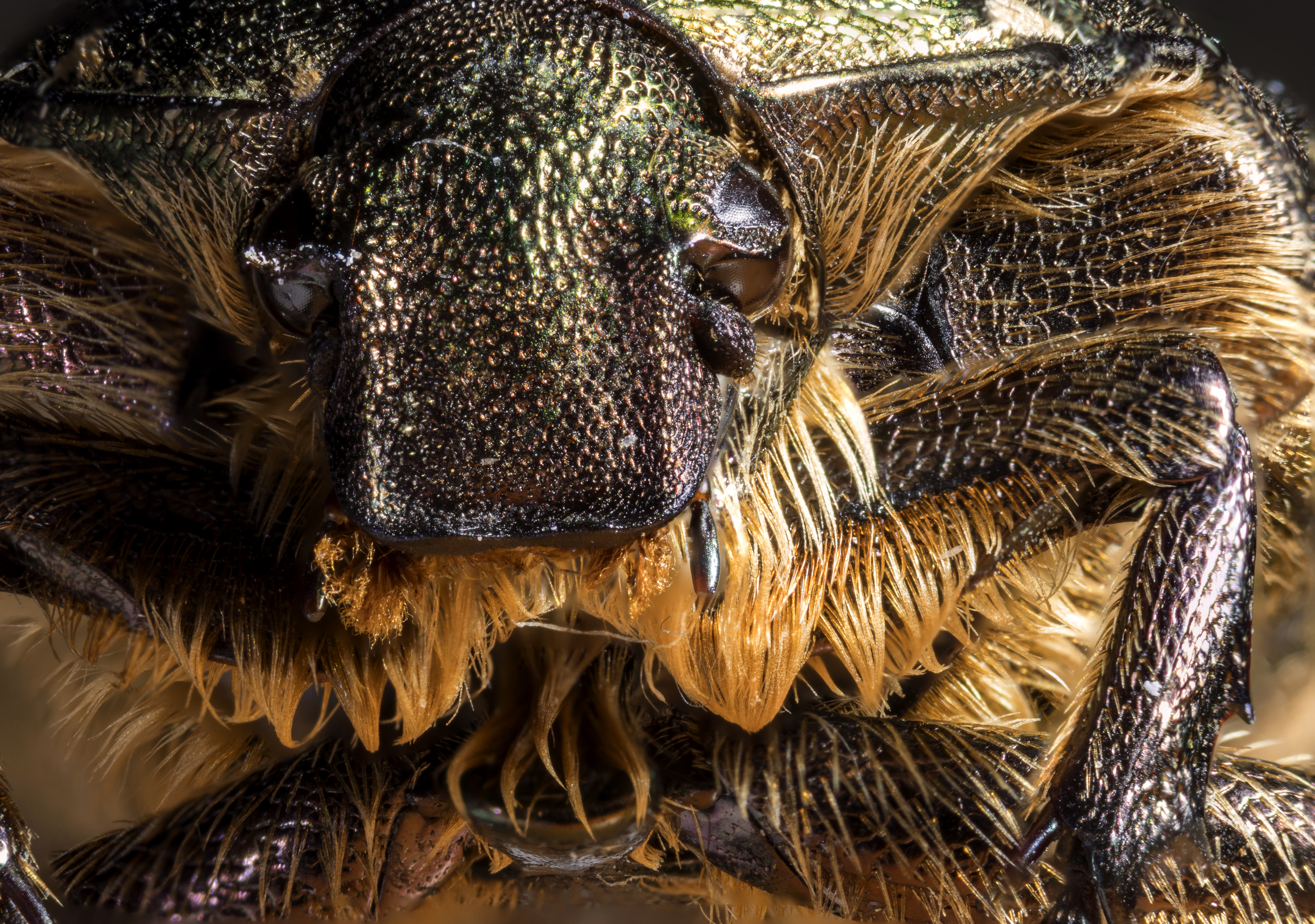
High quality closeup with head anatomic details well visible

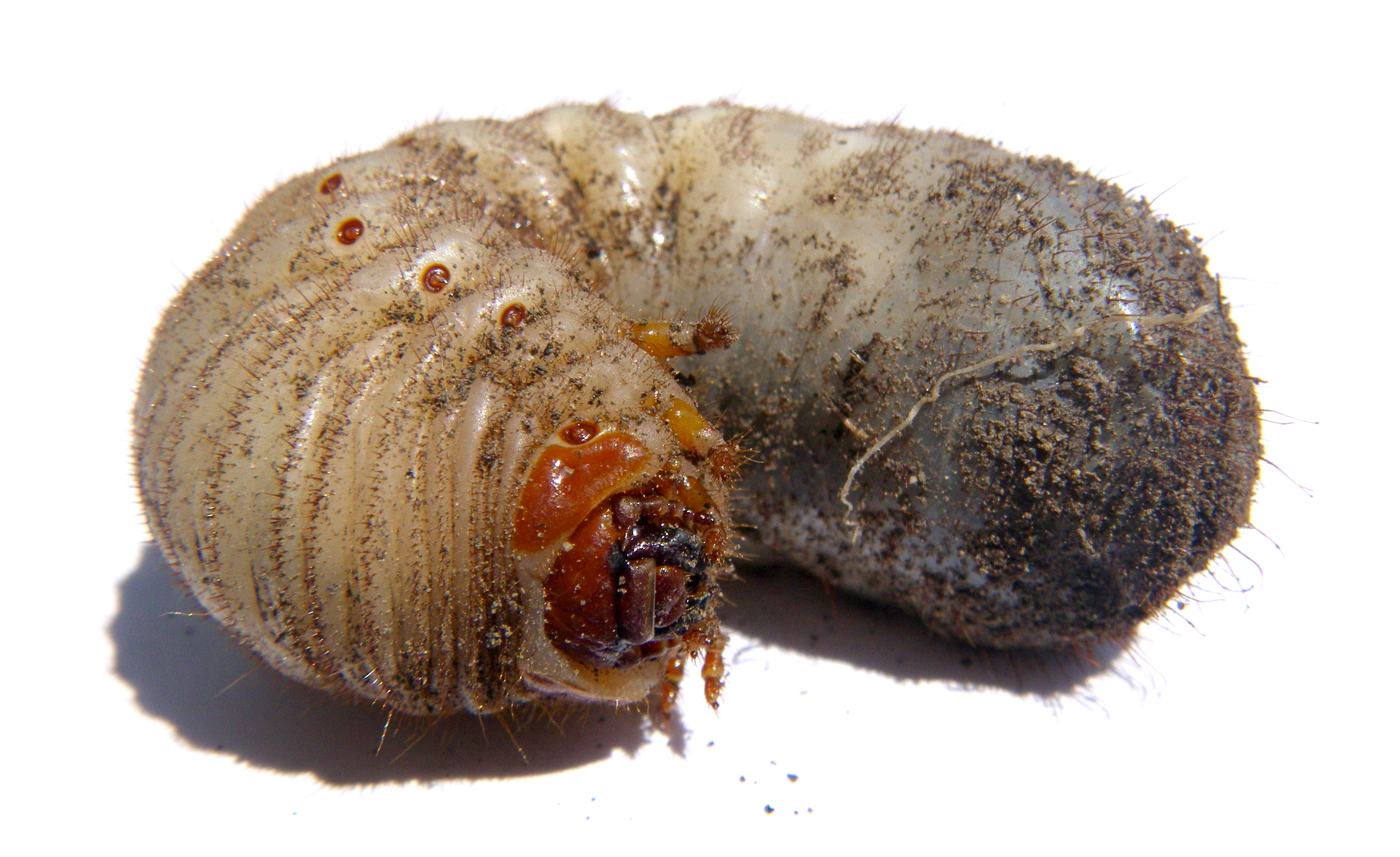
A scarab beetle grub from Australia

Some of the well-known beetles from the Scarabaeidae are Japanese beetles, dung beetles, June beetles, rose chafers (Australian, European, and North American), rhinoceros beetles, Hercules beetles, and Goliath beetles.

Several members of this family have structurally coloured shells which act as left-handed circular polarizers; this was the first-discovered example of circular polarization in nature.

== Ancient Egypt ==
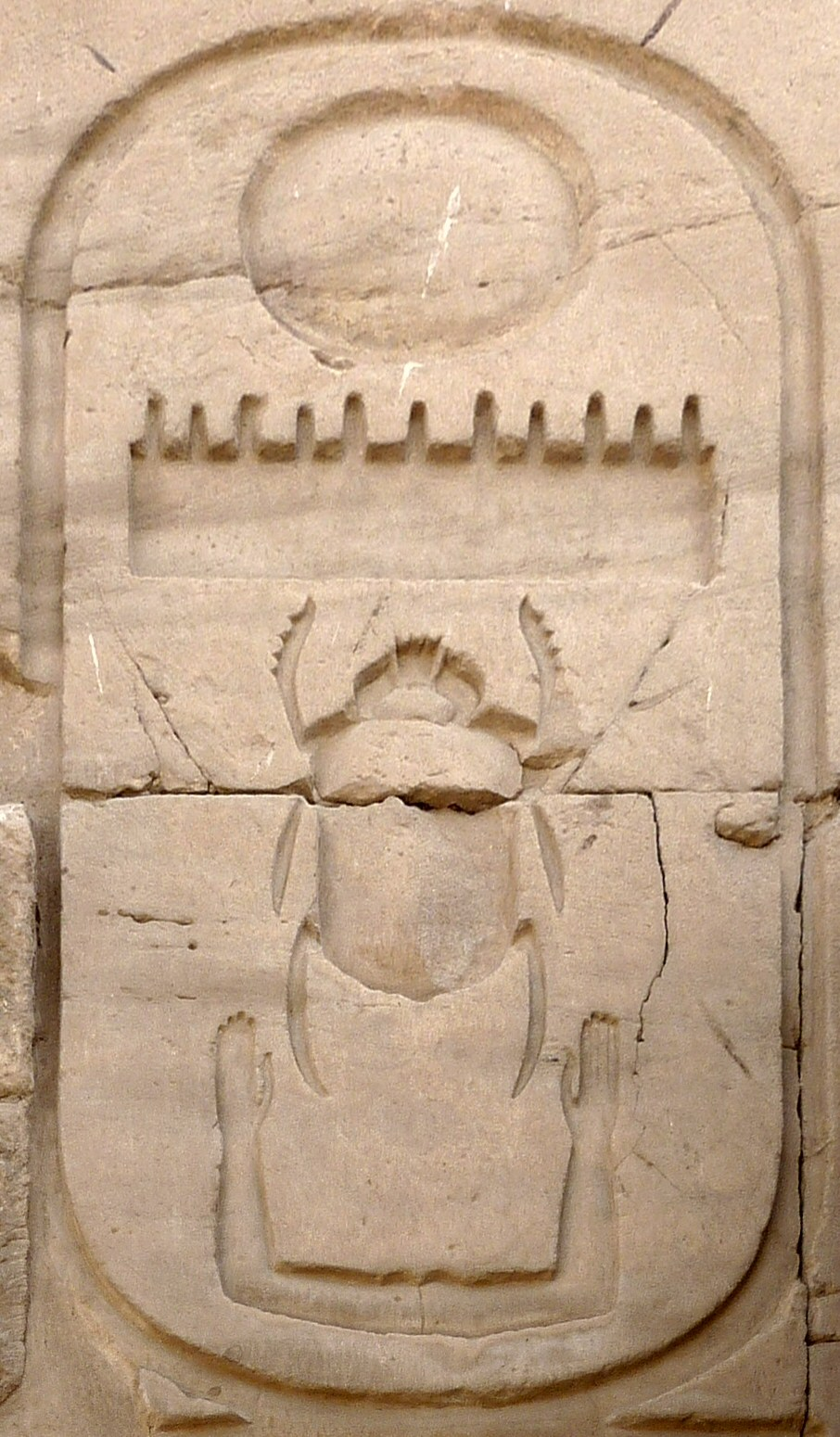
Sacred scarab in a cartouche of Thutmosis III from Karnak temple of Amun-Ra, Egypt

In Ancient Egypt, the dung beetle now known as Scarabaeus sacer (formerly Ateuchus sacer) was revered as sacred. Egyptian amulets representing the sacred scarab beetles were traded throughout the Mediterranean world.

== See also ==
- Dung beetle – Scarabaeidae dung beetles play an important role in temperate and tropical environments
- List of Scarabaeidae genera
- List of Scarabaeidae subfamilies and tribes
- Scarab artifact
