= Xyroa nitida =

Scientific classification
- Kingdom: Animalia
- Phylum: Arthropoda
- Clade: Pancrustacea
- Class: Insecta
- Order: Coleoptera
- Suborder: Polyphaga
- Infraorder: Scarabaeiformia
- Family: Scarabaeidae
- Genus: Xyroa
- Species: X. nitida

Binomial name
- Xyroa nitida Britton, 1987

Species of beetle

Xyroa nitida is a species of beetle of the family Scarabaeidae. It is found in Australia (Queensland).

== Description ==
Adults reach a length of about 12–13 mm (0.47–0.51 in). They are reddish brown and very similar to Xyroa polita, but may be distinguished by the 7-segmented antennae.
