= Scitala satelles =

Scientific classification
- Kingdom: Animalia
- Phylum: Arthropoda
- Clade: Pancrustacea
- Class: Insecta
- Order: Coleoptera
- Suborder: Polyphaga
- Infraorder: Scarabaeiformia
- Family: Scarabaeidae
- Genus: Scitala
- Species: S. satelles

Binomial name
- Scitala satelles Britton, 1987

Species of beetle

Scitala satelles is a species of beetle of the family Scarabaeidae. It is found in Australia (New South Wales).

== Description ==
Adults reach a length of about 10 mm (0.39 in). They are similar to Scitala simulans, but they are uniform reddish brown and the clypeus is less densely punctured.
