= Xyrine inusitatus =

Scientific classification
- Kingdom: Animalia
- Phylum: Arthropoda
- Clade: Pancrustacea
- Class: Insecta
- Order: Coleoptera
- Suborder: Polyphaga
- Infraorder: Scarabaeiformia
- Family: Scarabaeidae
- Genus: Xyrine
- Species: X. inusitatus

Binomial name
- Xyrine inusitatus Britton, 1987

Species of beetle

Xyrine inusitatus is a species of beetle of the family Scarabaeidae. It is found in Australia (Queensland, New South Wales).

== Description ==
Adults reach a length of about 12 mm (0.47 in). They are very similar to Xyrine carnei.
