= Sericesthis parallela =

Scientific classification
- Kingdom: Animalia
- Phylum: Arthropoda
- Clade: Pancrustacea
- Class: Insecta
- Order: Coleoptera
- Suborder: Polyphaga
- Infraorder: Scarabaeiformia
- Family: Scarabaeidae
- Genus: Sericesthis
- Species: S. parallela

Binomial name
- Sericesthis parallela Blackburn, 1890

Species of beetle

Sericesthis parallela is a species of beetle of the family Scarabaeidae. It is found in Australia (South Australia, New South Wales).

== Description ==
Adults reach a length of about 9–12 mm (0.35–0.47 in). They are very similar to Sericesthis nemoralis, but may be distinguished by the shape of the clypeus and aedeagus, as well as the denser punctuation of the former.
