= Sericesthis latens =

Scientific classification
- Kingdom: Animalia
- Phylum: Arthropoda
- Clade: Pancrustacea
- Class: Insecta
- Order: Coleoptera
- Suborder: Polyphaga
- Infraorder: Scarabaeiformia
- Family: Scarabaeidae
- Genus: Sericesthis
- Species: S. latens

Binomial name
- Sericesthis latens Britton, 1987

Species of beetle

Sericesthis latens is a species of beetle of the family Scarabaeidae. It is found in Australia (South Australia).

== Description ==
They are almost identical with Sericesthis vigilans, and differ only by the denser puncturation.
