= Sericesthis rufescens =

Scientific classification
- Kingdom: Animalia
- Phylum: Arthropoda
- Clade: Pancrustacea
- Class: Insecta
- Order: Coleoptera
- Suborder: Polyphaga
- Infraorder: Scarabaeiformia
- Family: Scarabaeidae
- Genus: Sericesthis
- Species: S. rufescens

Binomial name
- Sericesthis rufescens Britton, 1987

Species of beetle

Sericesthis rufescens is a species of beetle of the family Scarabaeidae. It is found in Australia (Western Australia).

== Description ==
Adults reach a length of about 8.5–10 mm (0.33–0.39 in). They are very similar to Sericesthis fovea, but may be distinguished by the dark reddish brown colour of the body and by the shape of the aedeagus.
