= Ophropyx approximans =

Scientific classification
- Kingdom: Animalia
- Phylum: Arthropoda
- Clade: Pancrustacea
- Class: Insecta
- Order: Coleoptera
- Suborder: Polyphaga
- Infraorder: Scarabaeiformia
- Family: Scarabaeidae
- Genus: Ophropyx
- Species: O. approximans

Binomial name
- Ophropyx approximans (Blackburn, 1898)

Synonyms
- Frenchella approximans Blackburn, 1898

Species of beetle

Ophropyx approximans is a species of beetle of the family Scarabaeidae. It is found in Australia (Victoria, New South Wales).

== Description ==
Adults reach a length of about 13–16 mm (0.51–0.63 in). They are dark reddish brown and similar to Ophropyx hispida, but may be distinguished by the coarser and slightly denser punctuation of the pronotum, as well as the shape of the aedeagus.
