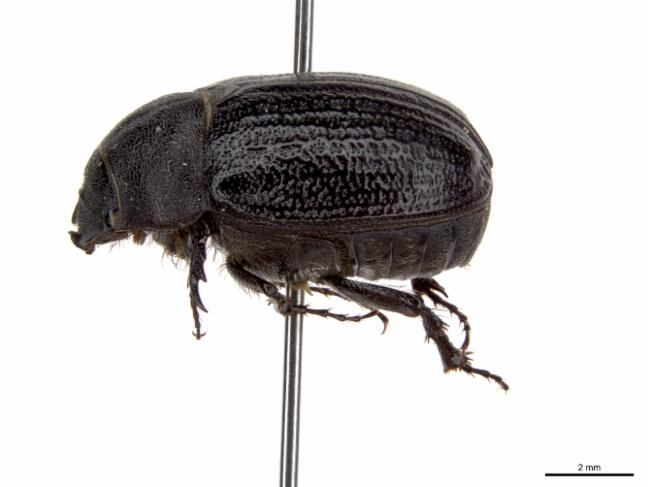

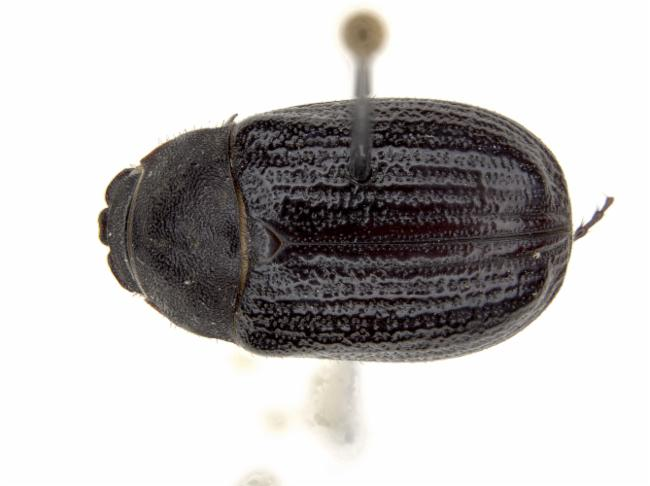

Scientific classification
- Kingdom: Animalia
- Phylum: Arthropoda
- Clade: Pancrustacea
- Class: Insecta
- Order: Coleoptera
- Suborder: Polyphaga
- Infraorder: Scarabaeiformia
- Family: Scarabaeidae
- Genus: Byrrhomorpha
- Species: B. ponderosa

Binomial name
- Byrrhomorpha ponderosa Blackburn, 1892

Synonyms
- Byrrhomorpha rudis Lea, 1919

= Byrrhomorpha ponderosa =

Species of beetle

Byrrhomorpha ponderosa is a species of beetle of the family Scarabaeidae. It is found in Australia (Western Australia).

== Description ==
Adults reach a length of about 10–13 mm (0.39–0.51 in). The colour is similar to that of Byrrhomorpha verres: the dorsal and ventral surface are black, the legs dark brown and the palpi and antennae pale yellowish brown.
