= Sericesthis major =

Scientific classification
- Kingdom: Animalia
- Phylum: Arthropoda
- Clade: Pancrustacea
- Class: Insecta
- Order: Coleoptera
- Suborder: Polyphaga
- Infraorder: Scarabaeiformia
- Family: Scarabaeidae
- Genus: Sericesthis
- Species: S. major

Binomial name
- Sericesthis major Britton, 1987

Species of beetle

Sericesthis major is a species of beetle of the family Scarabaeidae. It is found in Australia (Queensland).

== Description ==
Adults reach a length of about 15–18 mm (0.59–0.71 in). They are similar to Sericesthis geminata, but may be distinguished by the aedeagus and by the yellowish brown pronotum, which is not iridescent. The pronotum, scutellum and elytra all have the same colour.
