= Sericesthis brooksi =

Scientific classification
- Kingdom: Animalia
- Phylum: Arthropoda
- Clade: Pancrustacea
- Class: Insecta
- Order: Coleoptera
- Suborder: Polyphaga
- Infraorder: Scarabaeiformia
- Family: Scarabaeidae
- Genus: Sericesthis
- Species: S. brooksi

Binomial name
- Sericesthis brooksi Britton, 1987

Species of beetle

Sericesthis brooksi is a species of beetle of the family Scarabaeidae. It is found in Australia (Queensland).

== Description ==
Adults reach a length of about 12 mm (0.47 in). They are reddish brown and very similar to Sericesthis bisetosa, but they have only one setiferous puncture on each side of the frons and the shape of the aedeagus differs.

== Etymology ==
The species is named after its collector, J. G. Brooks.
