= Sericesthis propria =

Scientific classification
- Kingdom: Animalia
- Phylum: Arthropoda
- Clade: Pancrustacea
- Class: Insecta
- Order: Coleoptera
- Suborder: Polyphaga
- Infraorder: Scarabaeiformia
- Family: Scarabaeidae
- Genus: Sericesthis
- Species: S. propria

Binomial name
- Sericesthis propria Britton, 1987

Species of beetle

Sericesthis propria is a species of beetle of the family Scarabaeidae. It is found in Australia (Queensland).

== Description ==
Adults reach a length of about 10–12 mm (0.39–0.47 in). They are very similar to Sericesthis anepsia and can only be distinguished by the form of the aedeagus.
