= Sericesthis parvipes =

Scientific classification
- Kingdom: Animalia
- Phylum: Arthropoda
- Clade: Pancrustacea
- Class: Insecta
- Order: Coleoptera
- Suborder: Polyphaga
- Infraorder: Scarabaeiformia
- Family: Scarabaeidae
- Genus: Sericesthis
- Species: S. parvipes

Binomial name
- Sericesthis parvipes Blackburn, 1890

Species of beetle

Sericesthis parvipes is a species of beetle of the family Scarabaeidae. It is found in Australia (South Australia, New South Wales).

== Description ==
Adults reach a length of about 10–12 mm (0.39–0.47 in). They are similar to Sericesthis harti in colour and form, but may be distinguished by the absence of a lateral ridge on each side of the abdomen and by the form of the aedeagus.
