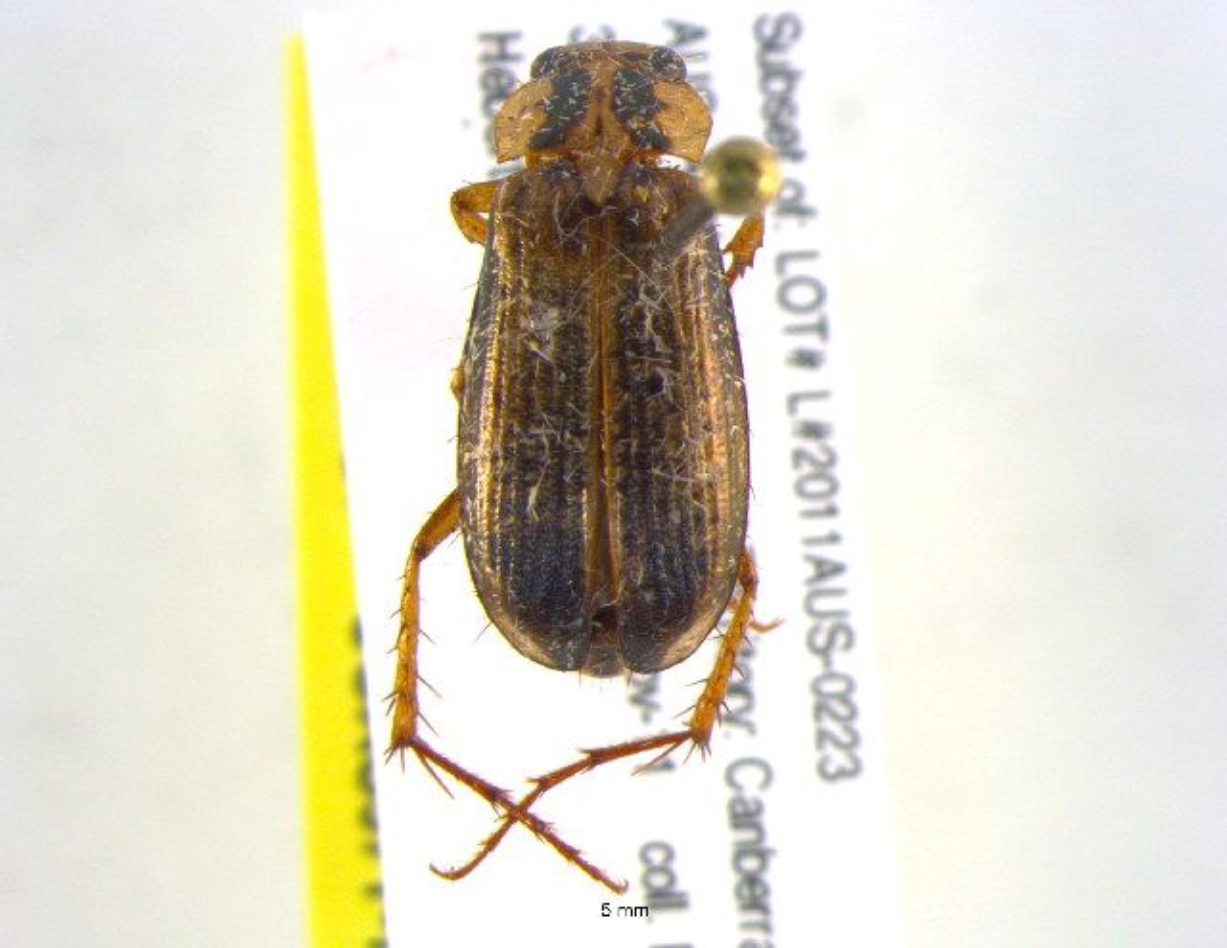

Scientific classification
- Kingdom: Animalia
- Phylum: Arthropoda
- Clade: Pancrustacea
- Class: Insecta
- Order: Coleoptera
- Suborder: Polyphaga
- Infraorder: Scarabaeiformia
- Family: Scarabaeidae
- Genus: Telura
- Species: T. imparilis

Binomial name
- Telura imparilis Britton, 1987

= Telura imparilis =

Species of beetle

Telura imparilis is a species of beetle of the family Scarabaeidae. It is found in Australia (New South Wales).

== Description ==
They are very similar to Telura vitticollis, but may be distinguished by the more strongly impressed punctuation of the head and pronotum, the metallic green reflection from the dark brown areas on the pronotum and the form of the aedeagus.
