= Sericesthis accola =

Scientific classification
- Kingdom: Animalia
- Phylum: Arthropoda
- Clade: Pancrustacea
- Class: Insecta
- Order: Coleoptera
- Suborder: Polyphaga
- Infraorder: Scarabaeiformia
- Family: Scarabaeidae
- Genus: Sericesthis
- Species: S. accola

Binomial name
- Sericesthis accola Britton, 1987

Species of beetle

Sericesthis accola is a species of beetle of the family Scarabaeidae. It is found in Australia (New South Wales).

== Description ==
Adults reach a length of about 10–11 mm (0.39–0.43 in). They are dark reddish brown. They are very similar to Sericesthis stipata, but may be distinguished by the puncturation of the abdomen and the form of the aedeagus.
