= Sericesthis suberosa =

Scientific classification
- Kingdom: Animalia
- Phylum: Arthropoda
- Clade: Pancrustacea
- Class: Insecta
- Order: Coleoptera
- Suborder: Polyphaga
- Infraorder: Scarabaeiformia
- Family: Scarabaeidae
- Genus: Sericesthis
- Species: S. suberosa

Binomial name
- Sericesthis suberosa Britton, 1987

Species of beetle

Sericesthis suberosa is a species of beetle of the family Scarabaeidae. It is found in Australia (South Australia).

== Description ==
Adults reach a length of about 9–10 mm (0.35–0.39 in). They are dark reddish brown or black and shining. They are very similar to Sericesthis erosa, but the head and pronotum are less densely punctured.
