= Sericesthis ignota =

Scientific classification
- Kingdom: Animalia
- Phylum: Arthropoda
- Clade: Pancrustacea
- Class: Insecta
- Order: Coleoptera
- Suborder: Polyphaga
- Infraorder: Scarabaeiformia
- Family: Scarabaeidae
- Genus: Sericesthis
- Species: S. ignota

Binomial name
- Sericesthis ignota Britton, 1987

Species of beetle

Sericesthis ignota is a species of beetle of the family Scarabaeidae. It is found in Australia (Australian Capital Territory, Victoria).

== Description ==
Adults reach a length of about 9 mm (0.35 in). They are dark reddish brown to black and similar to Sericesthis tetrica, but may be distinguished by more rounded sides of the pronotum and the form of the aedeagus.
