= Scitala volux =

Scientific classification
- Kingdom: Animalia
- Phylum: Arthropoda
- Clade: Pancrustacea
- Class: Insecta
- Order: Coleoptera
- Suborder: Polyphaga
- Infraorder: Scarabaeiformia
- Family: Scarabaeidae
- Genus: Scitala
- Species: S. volux

Binomial name
- Scitala volux Britton, 1987

Species of beetle

Scitala volux is a species of beetle of the family Scarabaeidae. It is found in Australia (South Australia, Western Australia).

== Description ==
Adults reach a length of about 11–14 mm (0.43–0.55 in). They are similar to Scitala celata, but larger. Furthermore, the aedeagus is different.
