= Sericesthis =

Scientific classification
- Kingdom: Animalia
- Phylum: Arthropoda
- Clade: Pancrustacea
- Class: Insecta
- Order: Coleoptera
- Suborder: Polyphaga
- Infraorder: Scarabaeiformia
- Family: Scarabaeidae
- Subfamily: Sericoidinae
- Tribe: Scitalini
- Genus: Sericesthis; Boisduval, 1835

Synonyms
- Anodontonyx Sharp, 1890; Hexalla Gistl, 1848

Genus of beetles

Sericesthis is a genus of beetles belonging to the family Scarabaeidae.

== Species ==
- Sericesthis accola Britton, 1987
- Sericesthis anepsia Britton, 1987
- Sericesthis antennalis (Blackburn, 1907)
- Sericesthis armaticeps (MacLeay, 1871)
- Sericesthis bisetosa Britton, 1987
- Sericesthis brooksi Britton, 1987
- Sericesthis calignea Britton, 1987
- Sericesthis carnei Britton, 1987
- Sericesthis cinnamea Britton, 1987
- Sericesthis consanguinea (Blackburn, 1907)
- Sericesthis coolumensis Britton, 1987
- Sericesthis egens Britton, 1987
- Sericesthis elderi Britton, 1987
- Sericesthis erosa Blackburn, 1890
- Sericesthis fovea Britton, 1987
- Sericesthis geminata Boisduval, 1835
- Sericesthis harti (Sharp, 1890)
- Sericesthis ignota Britton, 1987
- Sericesthis illawarrae Britton, 1987
- Sericesthis incisa Britton, 1987
- Sericesthis incola Britton, 1987
- Sericesthis ino (Blackburn, 1907)
- Sericesthis insularis (Lea, 1919)
- Sericesthis iris Britton, 1987
- Sericesthis janetae Britton, 1987
- Sericesthis latens Britton, 1987
- Sericesthis lutea Britton, 1987
- Sericesthis magna Britton, 1987
- Sericesthis major Britton, 1987
- Sericesthis metincisa Britton, 1987
- Sericesthis micans Blackburn, 1890
- Sericesthis minima Britton, 1987
- Sericesthis miskoi Britton, 1987
- Sericesthis nemoralis (Blackburn, 1907)
- Sericesthis nigra (Lea, 1919)
- Sericesthis nigrolineata Boisduval, 1835
- Sericesthis palumae Britton, 1987
- Sericesthis parallela Blackburn, 1890
- Sericesthis parvipes Blackburn, 1890
- Sericesthis propria Britton, 1987
- Sericesthis proxima Britton, 1987
- Sericesthis rectangula (Blackburn, 1907)
- Sericesthis rufescens Britton, 1987
- Sericesthis serena Britton, 1987
- Sericesthis stipata Britton, 1987
- Sericesthis storeyi Britton, 1987
- Sericesthis suberosa Britton, 1987
- Sericesthis suturalis (MacLeay, 1871)
- Sericesthis tetrica (Blackburn, 1907)
- Sericesthis vera Britton, 1987
- Sericesthis vigilans (Sharp, 1890)

== Selected former species ==
- Sericesthis dispar Blackburn, 1890
