= Sericesthis metincisa =

Scientific classification
- Kingdom: Animalia
- Phylum: Arthropoda
- Clade: Pancrustacea
- Class: Insecta
- Order: Coleoptera
- Suborder: Polyphaga
- Infraorder: Scarabaeiformia
- Family: Scarabaeidae
- Genus: Sericesthis
- Species: S. metincisa

Binomial name
- Sericesthis metincisa Britton, 1987

Species of beetle

Sericesthis metincisa is a species of beetle of the family Scarabaeidae. It is found in Australia (Queensland).

== Description ==
Adults reach a length of about 8–10.5 mm (0.31–0.41 in). They are very similar to Sericesthis incisa, but may be distinguished by the more rounded outline of the clypeus and the form of the aedeagus.
