= Sericesthis nigra =

Scientific classification
- Kingdom: Animalia
- Phylum: Arthropoda
- Clade: Pancrustacea
- Class: Insecta
- Order: Coleoptera
- Suborder: Polyphaga
- Infraorder: Scarabaeiformia
- Family: Scarabaeidae
- Genus: Sericesthis
- Species: S. nigra

Binomial name
- Sericesthis nigra (Lea, 1919)

Synonyms
- Anodontonyx niger Lea, 1919

Species of beetle

Sericesthis nigra, the small pasture scarab, is a species of beetle of the family Scarabaeidae. It is found in Australia (Tasmania, Victoria).

== Description ==
Adults reach a length of about 7–9 mm (0.28–0.35 in). They are black and very similar to Sericesthis tetrica, but may be distinguished by the dull surface of the elytra and the form of the aedeagus.
