= Homolotropus taylori =

Scientific classification
- Kingdom: Animalia
- Phylum: Arthropoda
- Clade: Pancrustacea
- Class: Insecta
- Order: Coleoptera
- Suborder: Polyphaga
- Infraorder: Scarabaeiformia
- Family: Scarabaeidae
- Genus: Homolotropus
- Species: H. taylori

Binomial name
- Homolotropus taylori Britton, 1970

Species of beetle

Homolotropus taylori is a species of beetle of the family Scarabaeidae. It is found in Australia (northern Queensland).

== Description ==
Adults reach a length of about 17–19 mm. They are very similar to Homolotropus sagus, but the colour is slightly darker, the short setae on the pronotum are not all directed posteriorly, but form a distinct pattern and the density of the setae on the head, pronotum, scutellum and elytra is much less.

== Etymology ==
The species is named after a colleague of the author, Dr. Robert W. Taylor.
