= Scitala calescens =

Scientific classification
- Kingdom: Animalia
- Phylum: Arthropoda
- Clade: Pancrustacea
- Class: Insecta
- Order: Coleoptera
- Suborder: Polyphaga
- Infraorder: Scarabaeiformia
- Family: Scarabaeidae
- Genus: Scitala
- Species: S. calescens

Binomial name
- Scitala calescens Blackburn, 1907

Species of beetle

Scitala calescens is a species of beetle of the family Scarabaeidae. It is found in Australia (Queensland).

== Description ==
Adults reach a length of about 11 mm (0.43 in). They are very similar to Scitala celata but may be distinguished by the shape of the pronotum and the aedeagus.
