= Scitala nemesis =

Scientific classification
- Kingdom: Animalia
- Phylum: Arthropoda
- Clade: Pancrustacea
- Class: Insecta
- Order: Coleoptera
- Suborder: Polyphaga
- Infraorder: Scarabaeiformia
- Family: Scarabaeidae
- Genus: Scitala
- Species: S. nemesis

Binomial name
- Scitala nemesis Blackburn, 1907

Species of beetle

Scitala nemesis is a species of beetle of the family Scarabaeidae. It is found in Australia (South Australia).

== Description ==
Adults reach a length of about 13 mm (0.51 in). They are very similar to Scitala uptoni but may be distinguished by the absence of lateral longitudinal ridges on the abdomen, as well as by the form of the aedeagus.
