= Scitala glabra =

Scientific classification
- Kingdom: Animalia
- Phylum: Arthropoda
- Clade: Pancrustacea
- Class: Insecta
- Order: Coleoptera
- Suborder: Polyphaga
- Infraorder: Scarabaeiformia
- Family: Scarabaeidae
- Genus: Scitala
- Species: S. glabra

Binomial name
- Scitala glabra (Blanchard, 1850)

Synonyms
- Sericesthis glabra Blanchard, 1850

Species of beetle

Scitala glabra is a species of beetle of the family Scarabaeidae. It is found in Australia (Queensland, New South Wales, South Australia).

== Description ==
Adults reach a length of about 10 mm (0.39 in). They are very similar to Scitala celata but smaller. They also have less rounded posterior pronotal angles and no lateral longitudinal abdominal ridges. Furthermore, the shape of the aedeagus differs.
