= Colpochelyne =

Scientific classification
- Kingdom: Animalia
- Phylum: Arthropoda
- Clade: Pancrustacea
- Class: Insecta
- Order: Coleoptera
- Suborder: Polyphaga
- Infraorder: Scarabaeiformia
- Family: Scarabaeidae
- Subfamily: Sericoidinae
- Tribe: Scitalini
- Genus: Colpochelyne; Britton, 1987
- Species: C. dux

Binomial name
- Colpochelyne dux Britton, 1987

Genus of beetles

Colpochelyne is a genus of beetle of the family Scarabaeidae. It is monotypic, being represented by the single species, Colpochelyne dux, which is found in Australia (Queensland).

== Description ==
Adults reach a length of about 10 mm (0.39 in). The head and anterior tibiae are reddish brown, while the remainder of the body and legs are yellowish brown.
