= Scitala papuana =

Scientific classification
- Kingdom: Animalia
- Phylum: Arthropoda
- Clade: Pancrustacea
- Class: Insecta
- Order: Coleoptera
- Suborder: Polyphaga
- Infraorder: Scarabaeiformia
- Family: Scarabaeidae
- Genus: Scitala
- Species: S. papuana

Binomial name
- Scitala papuana Moser, 1920

Species of beetle

Scitala papuana is a species of beetle of the family Scarabaeidae. It is found in Papua New Guinea.

== Description ==
Adults reach a length of about 9 mm (0.35 in). They have an oblong-oval, reddish-yellow, shiny body, with the head, pronotum, scutellum and legs red. The head is densely punctate, while the pronotum is moderately densely punctate dorsally. The scutellum is smooth. The elytra are moderately densely punctured and have cilia at the margins.
