= Scitala iridipennis =

Scientific classification
- Kingdom: Animalia
- Phylum: Arthropoda
- Clade: Pancrustacea
- Class: Insecta
- Order: Coleoptera
- Suborder: Polyphaga
- Infraorder: Scarabaeiformia
- Family: Scarabaeidae
- Genus: Scitala
- Species: S. iridipennis

Binomial name
- Scitala iridipennis Britton, 1987

Species of beetle

Scitala iridipennis is a species of beetle of the family Scarabaeidae. It is found in Australia (Queensland).

== Description ==
Adults reach a length of about 10.5 mm (0.41 in). The body and legs are dark reddish brown. The surface if the clypeus is shining and densely punctured, while the punctures on the frons are rather sparse. Some of these punctures are setiferous. The pronotum is iridescent and has some erect setae along the margin. The scutellum is unpunctured. The elytra are strongly iridescent, with sparse punctures on the intervals.
