= Sericesthis armaticeps =

Scientific classification
- Kingdom: Animalia
- Phylum: Arthropoda
- Clade: Pancrustacea
- Class: Insecta
- Order: Coleoptera
- Suborder: Polyphaga
- Infraorder: Scarabaeiformia
- Family: Scarabaeidae
- Genus: Sericesthis
- Species: S. armaticeps

Binomial name
- Sericesthis armaticeps (MacLeay, 1871)

Synonyms
- Scitala armaticeps MacLeay, 1871; Scitala impressa Brenske, 1900

Species of beetle

Sericesthis armaticeps is a species of beetle of the family Scarabaeidae. It is found in Australia (Queensland).

== Description ==
Adults reach a length of about 11 mm (0.43 in). They are yellowish brown, but slightly darker on the frons, the disc of the pronotum and apical sutural angles of the elytra.
