= Sericesthis minima =

Scientific classification
- Kingdom: Animalia
- Phylum: Arthropoda
- Clade: Pancrustacea
- Class: Insecta
- Order: Coleoptera
- Suborder: Polyphaga
- Infraorder: Scarabaeiformia
- Family: Scarabaeidae
- Genus: Sericesthis
- Species: S. minima

Binomial name
- Sericesthis minima Britton, 1987

Species of beetle

Sericesthis minima is a species of beetle of the family Scarabaeidae. It is found in Queensland, Australia.

== Description ==
Adults reach a length of about 8–9.5 mm (0.31–0.37 in). The frons is dark brown, while the clypeus, disc of the pronotum and scutellum are reddish or dark reddish brown. The elytra are pale yellowish-brown and the pygidium and ventral surface are yellowish-brown. The legs are reddish.
