= Sericesthis proxima =

Scientific classification
- Kingdom: Animalia
- Phylum: Arthropoda
- Clade: Pancrustacea
- Class: Insecta
- Order: Coleoptera
- Suborder: Polyphaga
- Infraorder: Scarabaeiformia
- Family: Scarabaeidae
- Genus: Sericesthis
- Species: S. proxima

Binomial name
- Sericesthis proxima Britton, 1987

Species of beetle

Sericesthis proxima is a species of beetle of the family Scarabaeidae. It is found in Australia (New South Wales).

== Description ==
Adults reach a length of about 10–12 mm (0.39–0.47 in). They are uniform reddish brown. The surface of the body is shining, but not iridescent.
