= Ophropyx hispida =

Scientific classification
- Kingdom: Animalia
- Phylum: Arthropoda
- Clade: Pancrustacea
- Class: Insecta
- Order: Coleoptera
- Suborder: Polyphaga
- Infraorder: Scarabaeiformia
- Family: Scarabaeidae
- Genus: Ophropyx
- Species: O. hispida

Binomial name
- Ophropyx hispida (Blackburn, 1898)

Synonyms
- Frenchella hispida Blackburn, 1898; Frenchella cribriceps Lea, 1919

Species of beetle

Ophropyx hispida is a species of beetle of the family Scarabaeidae. It is found in Australia (Australian Capital Territory, Victoria, New South Wales).

== Description ==
Adults reach a length of about 11–14 mm (0.43–0.55 in). The body is reddish-brown to black. The surface of the pronotum is more sparsely and finely punctured than in related Ophropyx ciliata and the elytral striae are more strongly impressed, and the intervals are more sparsely punctured.
