= Scitala aureorufa =

Scientific classification
- Kingdom: Animalia
- Phylum: Arthropoda
- Clade: Pancrustacea
- Class: Insecta
- Order: Coleoptera
- Suborder: Polyphaga
- Infraorder: Scarabaeiformia
- Family: Scarabaeidae
- Genus: Scitala
- Species: S. aureorufa

Binomial name
- Scitala aureorufa (Blanchard, 1850)

Synonyms
- Sericesthis aureorufa Blanchard, 1850; Scitala ambigua Blackburn, 1907; Scitala coxalis Blackburn, 1907; Scitala subsericans Blackburn, 1907

Species of beetle

Scitala aureorufa is a species of beetle of the family Scarabaeidae. It is found in Australia (New South Wales, Queensland, Tasmania, Victoria, South Australia).

== Description ==
Adults reach a length of about 14–17 mm (0.55–0.67 in). They are dark reddish brown, with the surface dull, except for the clypeus, which is shining.
