= Homolotropus metallicus =

Scientific classification
- Kingdom: Animalia
- Phylum: Arthropoda
- Clade: Pancrustacea
- Class: Insecta
- Order: Coleoptera
- Suborder: Polyphaga
- Infraorder: Scarabaeiformia
- Family: Scarabaeidae
- Genus: Homolotropus
- Species: H. metallicus

Binomial name
- Homolotropus metallicus Britton, 1970

Species of beetle

Homolotropus metallicus is a species of beetle of the family Scarabaeidae. It is found in Australia (southern Queensland, northern New South Wales).

== Description ==
Adults reach a length of about 16–19 mm. The head, pronotum and scutellum aredark brown or black with metallic green reflections, while the elytra are yellowish brown, usually with the disc mottled black and the lateral and apical declivities largely black.
