= Scitala juvenis =

Scientific classification
- Kingdom: Animalia
- Phylum: Arthropoda
- Clade: Pancrustacea
- Class: Insecta
- Order: Coleoptera
- Suborder: Polyphaga
- Infraorder: Scarabaeiformia
- Family: Scarabaeidae
- Genus: Scitala
- Species: S. juvenis

Binomial name
- Scitala juvenis Blackburn, 1907

Species of beetle

Scitala juvenis is a species of beetle of the family Scarabaeidae. It is found in Australia (Victoria).

== Description ==
Adults reach a length of about 8.5 mm (0.33 in). The head and pronotum are black, while the elytra are very dark brown.
