= Sericesthis janetae =

Scientific classification
- Kingdom: Animalia
- Phylum: Arthropoda
- Clade: Pancrustacea
- Class: Insecta
- Order: Coleoptera
- Suborder: Polyphaga
- Infraorder: Scarabaeiformia
- Family: Scarabaeidae
- Genus: Sericesthis
- Species: S. janetae

Binomial name
- Sericesthis janetae Britton, 1987

Species of beetle

Sericesthis janetae is a species of beetle of the family Scarabaeidae. It is found in Australia (Queensland).

== Description ==
Adults reach a length of about 8–11 mm (0.31–0.43 in). The frons is very dark reddish brown, while the clypeus, pronotum and scutellum are reddish brown and the elytra yellowish brown.

== Etymology ==
The species is named for a former colleague of the author, Janet Gleason.
