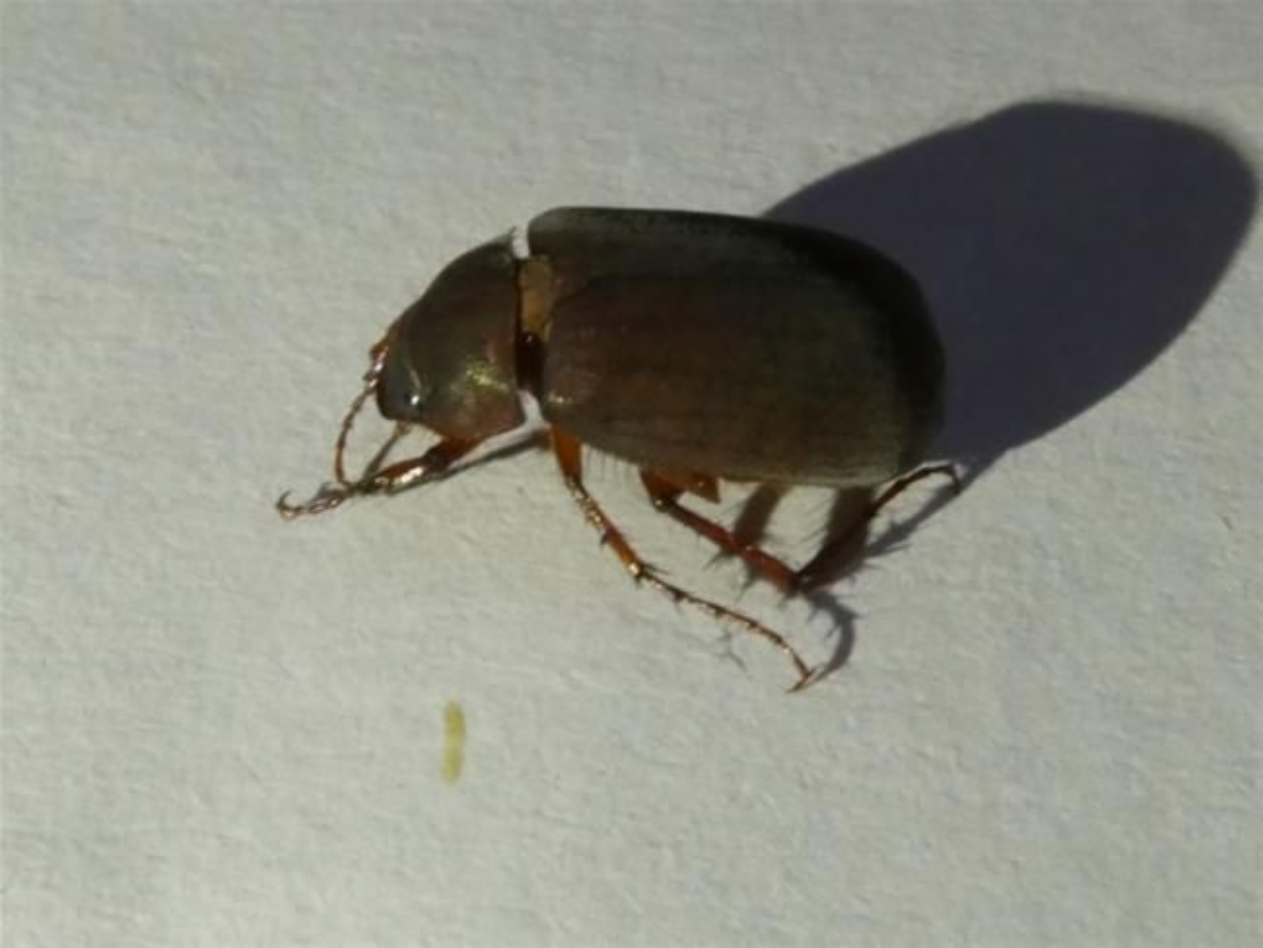

Scientific classification
- Kingdom: Animalia
- Phylum: Arthropoda
- Clade: Pancrustacea
- Class: Insecta
- Order: Coleoptera
- Suborder: Polyphaga
- Infraorder: Scarabaeiformia
- Family: Scarabaeidae
- Genus: Scitala
- Species: S. sericans

Binomial name
- Scitala sericans Erichson, 1842

Synonyms
- Scitala aenescens Burmeister, 1855; Sericesthis rugosiceps Blanchard, 1850

= Scitala sericans =

Species of beetle

Scitala sericans is a species of beetle of the family Scarabaeidae. It is found in Australia (Tasmania, Victoria, New South Wales).

== Description ==
Adults reach a length of about 11–14 mm (0.43–0.55 in). They are yellowish brown to very dark reddish brown. The clypeus is shining, while the frons, pronotum and elytra are rather dull and slightly iridescent.
