= Hadrops halei =

Scientific classification
- Kingdom: Animalia
- Phylum: Arthropoda
- Clade: Pancrustacea
- Class: Insecta
- Order: Coleoptera
- Suborder: Polyphaga
- Infraorder: Scarabaeiformia
- Family: Scarabaeidae
- Genus: Hadrops
- Species: H. halei

Binomial name
- Hadrops halei Britton, 1987

Species of beetle

Hadrops halei is a species of beetle of the family Scarabaeidae. It is found in Australia (Queensland).

== Description ==
Adults reach a length of about 9 mm (0.35 in). The head is pale reddish brown, while the remainder of the body and legs are yellowish-brown.

== Etymology ==
The species is named for its collector, Mr H. M. Hale.
