= Protelura nana =

Scientific classification
- Kingdom: Animalia
- Phylum: Arthropoda
- Clade: Pancrustacea
- Class: Insecta
- Order: Coleoptera
- Suborder: Polyphaga
- Infraorder: Scarabaeiformia
- Family: Scarabaeidae
- Genus: Protelura
- Species: P. nana

Binomial name
- Protelura nana Britton, 1987

Species of beetle

Protelura nana is a species of beetle of the family Scarabaeidae. It is found in Australia (Queensland).

== Description ==
Adults reach a length of about 6.5 mm (0.26 in). They yellowish brown, sometimes vaguely suffused with brown on the elytra and pronotum. The pronotum is sparsely punctured.
