= Scitala hirticeps =

Scientific classification
- Kingdom: Animalia
- Phylum: Arthropoda
- Clade: Pancrustacea
- Class: Insecta
- Order: Coleoptera
- Suborder: Polyphaga
- Infraorder: Scarabaeiformia
- Family: Scarabaeidae
- Genus: Scitala
- Species: S. hirticeps

Binomial name
- Scitala hirticeps (Blackburn, 1907)

Synonyms
- Anodontonyx hirticeps Blackburn, 1907; Anodontonyx opalescens Lea, 1919

Species of beetle

Scitala hirticeps is a species of beetle of the family Scarabaeidae. It is found in Australia (New South Wales).

== Description ==
Adults reach a length of about 10 mm (0.39 in). They are dark reddish brown with a dull sericeous iridescence. The legs are bright reddish brown. The clypeus is densely punctured and has some setiferous punctures near the base, each with a yellowish-brown seta. The pronotum has three or four punctures with yellowish setae. The scutellum is punctured (except at the apex) and the elytra are sparsely punctured, while the punctuation on the pygidium is fairly most dense in the centre.
