= Sericesthis carnei =

Scientific classification
- Kingdom: Animalia
- Phylum: Arthropoda
- Clade: Pancrustacea
- Class: Insecta
- Order: Coleoptera
- Suborder: Polyphaga
- Infraorder: Scarabaeiformia
- Family: Scarabaeidae
- Genus: Sericesthis
- Species: S. carnei

Binomial name
- Sericesthis carnei Britton, 1987

Species of beetle

Sericesthis carnei is a species of beetle of the family Scarabaeidae. It is found in Australia (New South Wales, Victoria).

== Description ==
Adults reach a length of about 6.5–8.5 mm (0.26–0.33 in). The clypeus is black with reddish anterior margin, the frons is black, the antennae pale yellowish brown, and the pronotum has a black disc, but dark reddish brown margins. The scutellum is dark reddish brown and the elytra are brown (but darker at the margins, and with the disc yellowish). The ventral surface of the thorax is black, the abdomen brown and the legs reddish-brown.
