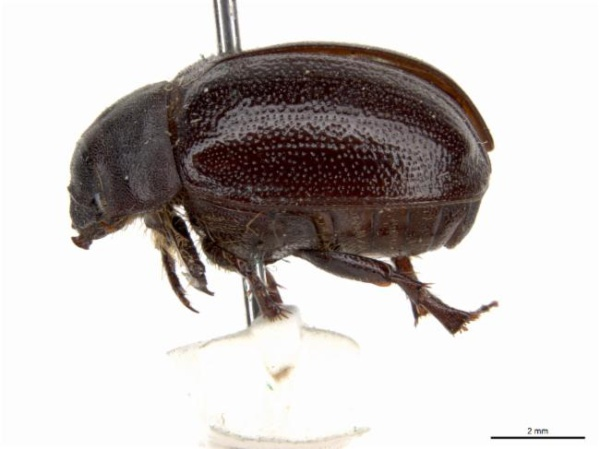

Scientific classification
- Kingdom: Animalia
- Phylum: Arthropoda
- Clade: Pancrustacea
- Class: Insecta
- Order: Coleoptera
- Suborder: Polyphaga
- Infraorder: Scarabaeiformia
- Family: Scarabaeidae
- Genus: Byrrhomorpha
- Species: B. basicollis

Binomial name
- Byrrhomorpha basicollis Lea, 1919

= Byrrhomorpha basicollis =

Species of beetle

Byrrhomorpha basicollis is a species of beetle of the family Scarabaeidae. It is found in Australia (South Australia).

== Description ==
Adults reach a length of about 9–10 mm (0.35–0.39 in). The dorsal surface is black or dark brown, while the ventral surface and legs are dark brown to reddish brown and the palpi and antennae yellowish brown.
