= Ophropyx =

Scientific classification
- Kingdom: Animalia
- Phylum: Arthropoda
- Clade: Pancrustacea
- Class: Insecta
- Order: Coleoptera
- Suborder: Polyphaga
- Infraorder: Scarabaeiformia
- Family: Scarabaeidae
- Subfamily: Sericoidinae
- Tribe: Scitalini
- Genus: Ophropyx; Britton, 1987

Genus of leaf beetles

Ophropyx is a genus of beetles belonging to the family Scarabaeidae.

== Species ==
- Ophropyx approximans (Blackburn, 1898)
- Ophropyx ciliata (Boisduval, 1835)
- Ophropyx hispida (Blackburn, 1898)
