= Byrrhomorpha =

Scientific classification
- Kingdom: Animalia
- Phylum: Arthropoda
- Clade: Pancrustacea
- Class: Insecta
- Order: Coleoptera
- Suborder: Polyphaga
- Infraorder: Scarabaeiformia
- Family: Scarabaeidae
- Subfamily: Sericoidinae
- Tribe: Scitalini
- Genus: Byrrhomorpha; Blackburn, 1892

Genus of beetles

Byrrhomorpha is a genus of beetles belonging to the family Scarabaeidae.

== Species ==
- Byrrhomorpha basicollis Lea, 1919
- Byrrhomorpha ponderosa Blackburn, 1892
- Byrrhomorpha verres Blackburn, 1892
