= Hadrops =

Scientific classification
- Kingdom: Animalia
- Phylum: Arthropoda
- Clade: Pancrustacea
- Class: Insecta
- Order: Coleoptera
- Suborder: Polyphaga
- Infraorder: Scarabaeiformia
- Family: Scarabaeidae
- Subfamily: Sericoidinae
- Tribe: Scitalini
- Genus: Hadrops; Britton, 1987

Genus of beetles

Hadrops is a genus of beetles belonging to the family Scarabaeidae.

== Species ==
- Hadrops flavus (Lea, 1919)
- Hadrops halei Britton, 1987
