= Scitala howdeni =

Scientific classification
- Kingdom: Animalia
- Phylum: Arthropoda
- Clade: Pancrustacea
- Class: Insecta
- Order: Coleoptera
- Suborder: Polyphaga
- Infraorder: Scarabaeiformia
- Family: Scarabaeidae
- Genus: Scitala
- Species: S. howdeni

Binomial name
- Scitala howdeni Britton, 1987

Species of beetle

Scitala howdeni is a species of beetle of the family Scarabaeidae. It is found in Australia (Queensland).

== Description ==
Adults reach a length of about 13–15 mm (0.51–0.59 in). They are dark reddish brown to piceous, with the elytra and sometimes also the pronotum strongly iridescent.

== Etymology ==
The species is named for its collectors, Henry and Anne Howden.
