= Sericesthis bisetosa =

Scientific classification
- Kingdom: Animalia
- Phylum: Arthropoda
- Clade: Pancrustacea
- Class: Insecta
- Order: Coleoptera
- Suborder: Polyphaga
- Infraorder: Scarabaeiformia
- Family: Scarabaeidae
- Genus: Sericesthis
- Species: S. bisetosa

Binomial name
- Sericesthis bisetosa Britton, 1987

Species of beetle

Sericesthis bisetosa is a species of beetle of the family Scarabaeidae. It is found in Australia (Queensland).

== Description ==
Adults reach a length of about 12–14 mm (0.47–0.55 in). They are dark reddish brown and very similar to Sericesthis magna, but the elytra have a uniform colour, the pronotal angles are more rounded and the form of the aedeagus differs.
