= Sericesthis miskoi =

Scientific classification
- Kingdom: Animalia
- Phylum: Arthropoda
- Clade: Pancrustacea
- Class: Insecta
- Order: Coleoptera
- Suborder: Polyphaga
- Infraorder: Scarabaeiformia
- Family: Scarabaeidae
- Genus: Sericesthis
- Species: S. miskoi

Binomial name
- Sericesthis miskoi Britton, 1987

Australian species of beetle

Sericesthis miskoi is an Australian species of beetle (Coleoptera) in the genus Sericesthis, and family Scarabaeidae. The holotype was collected from Mount Coolum, Queensland and the beetle's range is restricted to the coastal areas of Queensland. It was first described by E. B. Britton in 1987.

== Description ==
Adults reach a length of about 9–11 mm (0.35–0.43 in). The head and pronotum are dark reddish brown, while the elytra are yellowish brown.

== Etymology ==
The species is named in honor of the Ukrainian-Australian entomologist and artist Stefan Misko.
