= Scitala rorida =

Scientific classification
- Kingdom: Animalia
- Phylum: Arthropoda
- Clade: Pancrustacea
- Class: Insecta
- Order: Coleoptera
- Suborder: Polyphaga
- Infraorder: Scarabaeiformia
- Family: Scarabaeidae
- Genus: Scitala
- Species: S. rorida

Binomial name
- Scitala rorida Burmeister, 1855

Synonyms
- Scitala hospes Blackburn, 1907

Species of beetle

Scitala rorida is a species of beetle of the family Scarabaeidae. It is found in Australia (southern Queensland, New South Wales, Victoria).

== Description ==
Adults reach a length of about 15 mm (0.59 in). The body and legs are reddish brown, with the head darker reddish brown.
