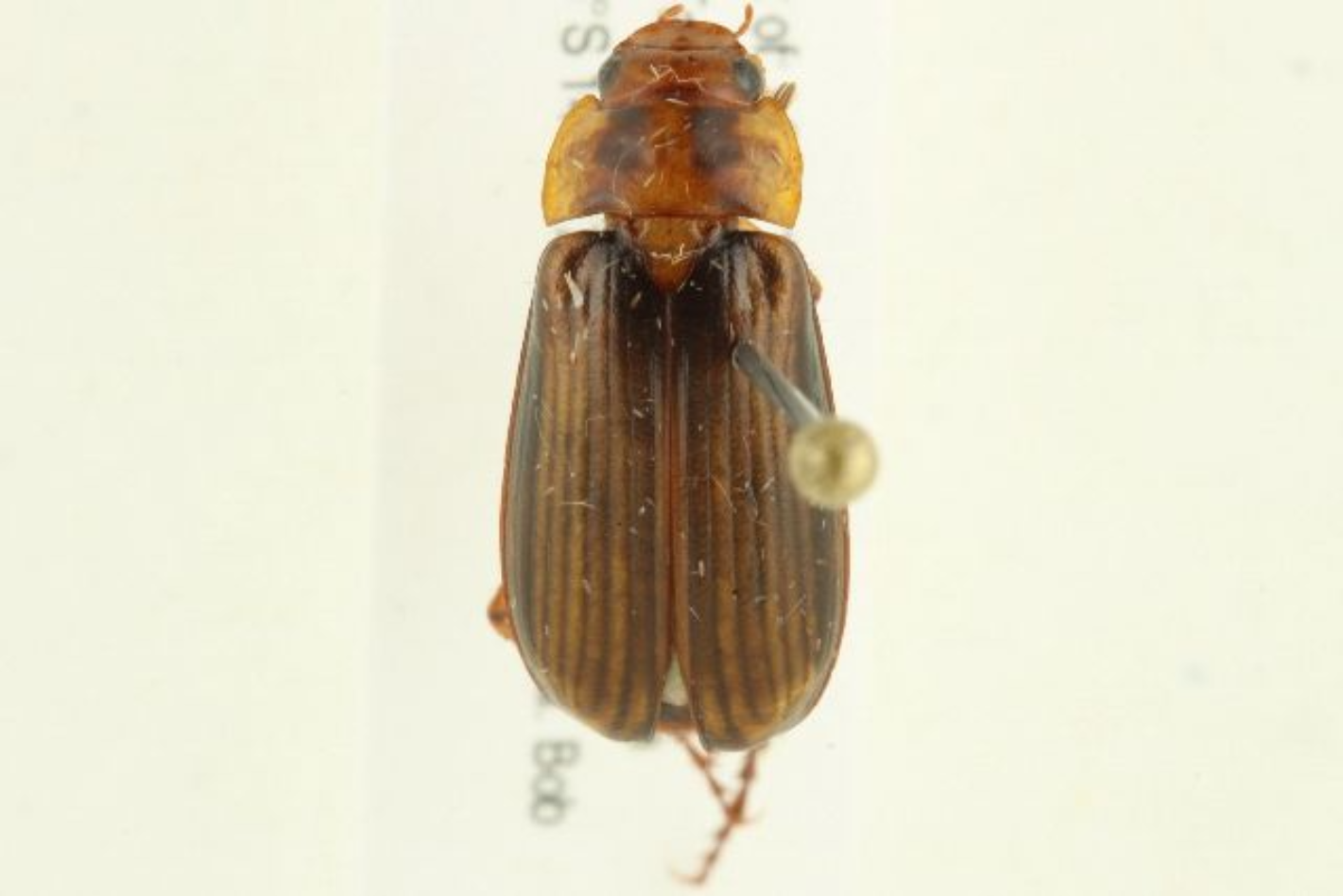

Scientific classification
- Kingdom: Animalia
- Phylum: Arthropoda
- Clade: Pancrustacea
- Class: Insecta
- Order: Coleoptera
- Suborder: Polyphaga
- Infraorder: Scarabaeiformia
- Family: Scarabaeidae
- Genus: Telura
- Species: T. alta

Binomial name
- Telura alta Britton, 1987

= Telura alta =

Species of beetle

Telura alta is a species of beetle of the family Scarabaeidae. It is found in Australia (Tasmania, the Australian Capital Territory, South Australia).

== Description ==
The head, pronotum and scutellum are pale testaceous, sometimes with a brown spot on the frons and on each side of the disc of pronotum. The elytra are pale brown, but darker near the scutellum and at sides and a testaceous sutural stria.
