= Scitalini =

Scientific classification
- Kingdom: Animalia
- Phylum: Arthropoda
- Clade: Pancrustacea
- Class: Insecta
- Order: Coleoptera
- Suborder: Polyphaga
- Infraorder: Scarabaeiformia
- Family: Scarabaeidae
- Subfamily: Sericoidinae
- Tribe: Scitalini; Britton, 1957

Tribe of beetles

Scitalini is a tribe of May beetles and junebugs in the family Scarabaeidae.

== Genera ==
These genera belong to the tribe Scitalini:

- Byrrhomorpha Blackburn, 1892
- Colpochelyne Britton, 1987
- Colpochilodes Blackburn, 1898
- Gnaphalopoda Reiche, 1860
- Hadrops Britton, 1987
- Homolotropus MacLeay, 1871
- Idanastes Britton, 1987
- Ophropyx Britton, 1987
- Phorine Britton, 1987
- Protelura Britton, 1987
- Scitala Erichson, 1842
- Sericesthis Boisduval, 1835
- Synchilus Britton, 1956
- Telura Erichson, 1842
- Xyrine Britton, 1987
- Xyroa Britton, 1987
- Xyrodes Britton, 1987
