= Sericesthis illawarrae =

Scientific classification
- Kingdom: Animalia
- Phylum: Arthropoda
- Clade: Pancrustacea
- Class: Insecta
- Order: Coleoptera
- Suborder: Polyphaga
- Infraorder: Scarabaeiformia
- Family: Scarabaeidae
- Genus: Sericesthis
- Species: S. illawarrae

Binomial name
- Sericesthis illawarrae Britton, 1987

Species of beetle

Sericesthis illawarrae is a species of beetle of the family Scarabaeidae. It is found in Australia (New South Wales).

== Description ==
Adults reach a length of about 9.5–12 mm (0.37–0.47 in). The head, pronotum and scutellum are black, sometimes with the anterior half of the clypeus, disc of the pronotum and scutellum reddish brown and the remainder black. The elytra and abdomen are yellowish or reddish brown and the ventral surface of the thorax is dark brown or black. The legs are black to reddish.
