= Sericesthis calignea =

Scientific classification
- Kingdom: Animalia
- Phylum: Arthropoda
- Clade: Pancrustacea
- Class: Insecta
- Order: Coleoptera
- Suborder: Polyphaga
- Infraorder: Scarabaeiformia
- Family: Scarabaeidae
- Genus: Sericesthis
- Species: S. calignea

Binomial name
- Sericesthis calignea Britton, 1987

Species of beetle

Sericesthis calignea is a species of beetle of the family Scarabaeidae. It is found in Australia (Western Australia).

== Description ==
Adults reach a length of about 8.5–9.5 mm (0.33–0.37 in). The head, pronotum and elytra are black, while the abdomen and legs are dark brown, and the rest of the ventral surface is black. The antennae and palpi are pale reddish brown. They have pale yellow setae.
