= Synchilus =

Scientific classification
- Kingdom: Animalia
- Phylum: Arthropoda
- Clade: Pancrustacea
- Class: Insecta
- Order: Coleoptera
- Suborder: Polyphaga
- Infraorder: Scarabaeiformia
- Family: Scarabaeidae
- Subfamily: Sericoidinae
- Tribe: Scitalini
- Genus: Synchilus; Britton, 1956
- Species: S. gisleni

Binomial name
- Synchilus gisleni Britton, 1956

Genus of beetles

Synchilus is a genus of beetle of the family Scarabaeidae. It is monotypic, being represented by the single species, Synchilus gisleni, which is found in Australia (Western Australia).

== Description ==
Adults reach a length of about 8–9 mm (0.31–0.35 in). They are yellowish brown, with the surface of the clypeus punctured. The pronotum has a fringe of long, pale yellow setae along the lateral and anterior margins, as well as a fringe of short setae along the basal margin.
