= Paraschizognathus =

Scientific classification
- Kingdom: Animalia
- Phylum: Arthropoda
- Clade: Pancrustacea
- Class: Insecta
- Order: Coleoptera
- Suborder: Polyphaga
- Infraorder: Scarabaeiformia
- Family: Scarabaeidae
- Tribe: Anoplognathini
- Subtribe: Anoplognathina
- Genus: Paraschizognathus; Ohaus, 1904

Genus of leaf beetles

Paraschizognathus is a genus of beetles belonging to the family Scarabaeidae.

== Species ==
- Paraschizognathus brittoni Carne, 1974
- Paraschizognathus brunneus Carne, 1958
- Paraschizognathus elgatus Carne, 1958
- Paraschizognathus frazieri Carne, 1974
- Paraschizognathus marcus Allsopp & Carne, 1986
- Paraschizognathus miskoi Carne, 1974
- Paraschizognathus ocularis Carne, 1958
- Paraschizognathus olivaceus Ohaus, 1904
- Paraschizognathus pinarus Carne, 1958
- Paraschizognathus prasinicollis Ohaus, 1904
- Paraschizognathus prasinus (Boisduval, 1835)
- Paraschizognathus queenslandicus Carne, 1958
- †Paraschizognathus tubrabuccae Carne, 1958
