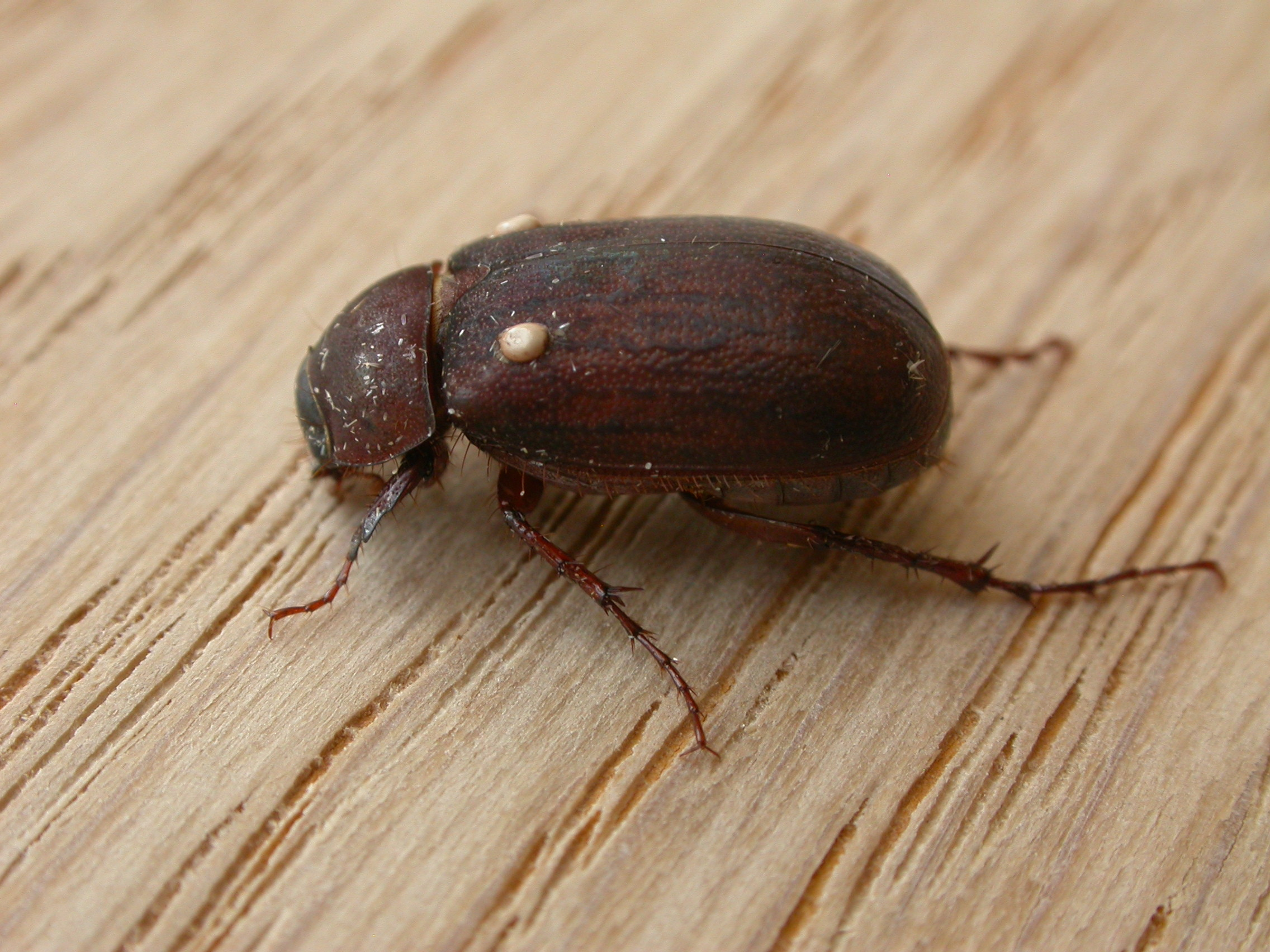

Scientific classification
- Kingdom: Animalia
- Phylum: Arthropoda
- Clade: Pancrustacea
- Class: Insecta
- Order: Coleoptera
- Suborder: Polyphaga
- Infraorder: Scarabaeiformia
- Family: Scarabaeidae
- Genus: Sericesthis
- Species: S. nigrolineata

Binomial name
- Sericesthis nigrolineata Boisduval, 1835

Synonyms
- Scitala rugosula Harold, 1869; Sericesthis pruinosa Blanchard, 1850; Scitala languida Erichson, 1842

= Sericesthis nigrolineata =

Species of beetle

Sericesthis nigrolineata, the dusky pasture scarab, is a species of beetle of the family Scarabaeidae. It is found in Australia (New South Wales, Queensland, South Australia, Victoria, Tasmania).

== Description ==
Adults reach a length of about 10–14 mm (0.39–0.55 in). The clypeus is reddish brown, the frons dark brown or reddish brown and the pronotum and elytra reddish brown, mottled with dark brown and slightly sericeous. There are punctures with brown setae on the clypeus. The pronotum and elytra also have punctures with setae, but these are minute.
