= Phorine =

Scientific classification
- Kingdom: Animalia
- Phylum: Arthropoda
- Clade: Pancrustacea
- Class: Insecta
- Order: Coleoptera
- Suborder: Polyphaga
- Infraorder: Scarabaeiformia
- Family: Scarabaeidae
- Subfamily: Sericoidinae
- Tribe: Scitalini
- Genus: Phorine; Britton, 1987
- Species: P. anomala

Binomial name
- Phorine anomala (Blackburn, 1907)

Synonyms
- Byrrhomorpha anomala Blackburn, 1907

Genus of beetles

Phorine is a genus of beetle of the family Scarabaeidae. It is monotypic, being represented by the single species, Phorine anomala, which is found in Australia (New South Wales).

== Description ==
Adults reach a length of about 13–14 mm (0.51–0.55 in). They are dark brown or black, with the head and pronotum densely punctured. The scutellum is punctured on each side of the base and the elytra are coarsely punctured.
