= Protelura guttata =

Scientific classification
- Kingdom: Animalia
- Phylum: Arthropoda
- Clade: Pancrustacea
- Class: Insecta
- Order: Coleoptera
- Suborder: Polyphaga
- Infraorder: Scarabaeiformia
- Family: Scarabaeidae
- Genus: Protelura
- Species: P. guttata

Binomial name
- Protelura guttata Britton, 1987

Species of beetle

Protelura guttata is a species of beetle of the family Scarabaeidae. It is found in Australia (Queensland).

== Description ==
Adults reach a length of about 7–9 mm (0.28–0.35 in). The labrum and clypeus are testaceous, with a dark brown edge and the frons is testaceous with dark brown areas near the eyes. The pronotum is testaceous with two dark brown areas. The scutellum is testaceous in middle and dark at the base and sides. The elytra are also testaceous, with numerous dark brown spots.
