= Scitala pullata =

Scientific classification
- Kingdom: Animalia
- Phylum: Arthropoda
- Clade: Pancrustacea
- Class: Insecta
- Order: Coleoptera
- Suborder: Polyphaga
- Infraorder: Scarabaeiformia
- Family: Scarabaeidae
- Genus: Scitala
- Species: S. pullata

Binomial name
- Scitala pullata (Boisduval, 1835)

Synonyms
- Sericesthis pullata Boisduval, 1835

Species of beetle

Scitala pullata is a species of beetle of the family Scarabaeidae. It is found in Australia.
