= Scitala fustula =

Scientific classification
- Kingdom: Animalia
- Phylum: Arthropoda
- Clade: Pancrustacea
- Class: Insecta
- Order: Coleoptera
- Suborder: Polyphaga
- Infraorder: Scarabaeiformia
- Family: Scarabaeidae
- Genus: Scitala
- Species: S. fustula

Binomial name
- Scitala fustula Britton, 1987

Species of beetle

Scitala fustula is a species of beetle of the family Scarabaeidae. It is found in Australia (Queensland).

== Description ==
Adults reach a length of about 15–17 mm (0.59–0.67 in). They are dark velvety brown, except for the shining clypeus.
