= Sericesthis palumae =

Scientific classification
- Kingdom: Animalia
- Phylum: Arthropoda
- Clade: Pancrustacea
- Class: Insecta
- Order: Coleoptera
- Suborder: Polyphaga
- Infraorder: Scarabaeiformia
- Family: Scarabaeidae
- Genus: Sericesthis
- Species: S. palumae

Binomial name
- Sericesthis palumae Britton, 1987

Species of beetle

Sericesthis palumae is a species of beetle of the family Scarabaeidae. It is found in Australia (Queensland).

== Description ==
Adults reach a length of about 11–12 mm (0.43–0.47 in). The head and pronotum are dark reddish brown, while the elytra are reddish brown and iridescent.
