= Sericesthis vera =

Scientific classification
- Kingdom: Animalia
- Phylum: Arthropoda
- Clade: Pancrustacea
- Class: Insecta
- Order: Coleoptera
- Suborder: Polyphaga
- Infraorder: Scarabaeiformia
- Family: Scarabaeidae
- Genus: Sericesthis
- Species: S. vera

Binomial name
- Sericesthis vera Britton, 1987

Species of beetle

Sericesthis vera is a species of beetle of the family Scarabaeidae. It is found in Australia (Queensland).

== Description ==
Adults reach a length of about 11.5 mm (0.45 in). The dorsal surface is reddish or yellowish-brown, while the ventral surface is also yellowish-brown, but paler.
