= Xyrodes =

Scientific classification
- Kingdom: Animalia
- Phylum: Arthropoda
- Clade: Pancrustacea
- Class: Insecta
- Order: Coleoptera
- Suborder: Polyphaga
- Infraorder: Scarabaeiformia
- Family: Scarabaeidae
- Subfamily: Sericoidinae
- Tribe: Scitalini
- Genus: Xyrodes; Britton, 1987
- Species: X. calorata

Binomial name
- Xyrodes calorata (Blackburn, 1907)

Synonyms
- Frenchella calorata Blackburn, 1907

Genus of beetles

Xyrodes is a genus of beetle of the family Scarabaeidae. It is monotypic, being represented by the single species, Xyrodes calorata, which is found in Australia (Queensland).

== Description ==
Adults reach a length of about 12 mm (0.47 in). The head, pronotum and scutellum are black or dark brown, while the elytra and abdomen are reddish brown. The edges of the elytra and the lateral ridges of the abdomen have fringes of pale yellowish setae.
