= Telura (beetle) =

Scientific classification
- Kingdom: Animalia
- Phylum: Arthropoda
- Clade: Pancrustacea
- Class: Insecta
- Order: Coleoptera
- Suborder: Polyphaga
- Infraorder: Scarabaeiformia
- Family: Scarabaeidae
- Subfamily: Sericoidinae
- Tribe: Scitalini
- Genus: Telura; Erichson, 1842

Genus of beetles

Telura is a genus of beetles belonging to the family Scarabaeidae.

== Species ==
- Telura alta Britton, 1987
- Telura imparilis Britton, 1987
- Telura monticola Britton, 1987
- Telura petiolata Britton, 1987
- Telura vitticollis Erichson, 1842
