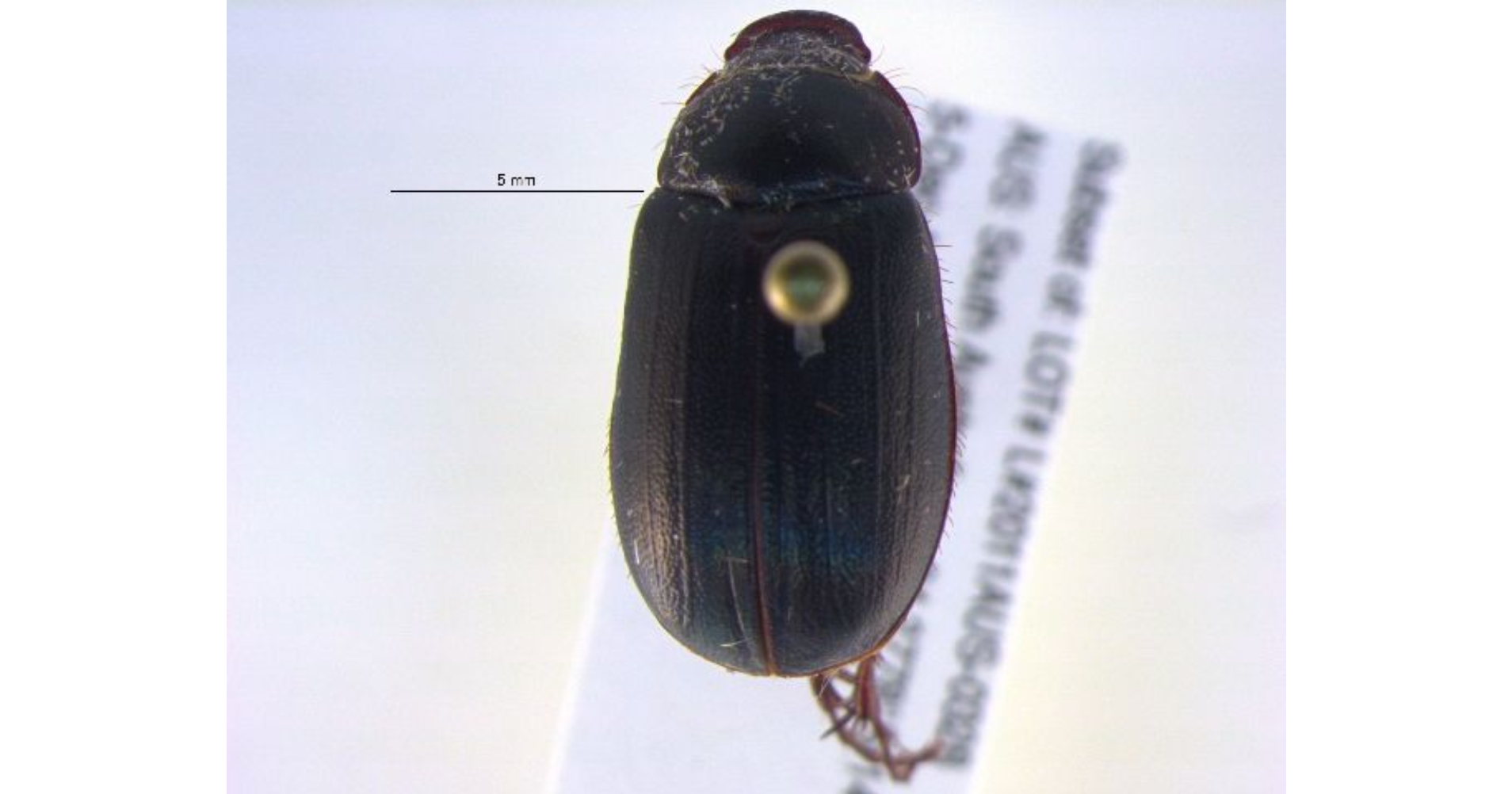

Scientific classification
- Kingdom: Animalia
- Phylum: Arthropoda
- Clade: Pancrustacea
- Class: Insecta
- Order: Coleoptera
- Suborder: Polyphaga
- Infraorder: Scarabaeiformia
- Family: Scarabaeidae
- Genus: Sericesthis
- Species: S. micans

Binomial name
- Sericesthis micans Blackburn, 1890

Synonyms
- Anodontonyx creber Blackburn, 1907; Anodontonyx gravicollis Blackburn, 1907; Anodontonyx indignus Blackburn, 1907

= Sericesthis micans =

Species of beetle

Sericesthis micans is a species of beetle of the family Scarabaeidae. It is found in Australia (South Australia, New South Wales, Victoria, Queensland).

== Description ==
Adults reach a length of about 9–12 mm (0.35–0.47 in). They are reddish brown to black, with the pronotum and elytra slightly iridescent.
