= Sericesthis suturalis =

Scientific classification
- Kingdom: Animalia
- Phylum: Arthropoda
- Clade: Pancrustacea
- Class: Insecta
- Order: Coleoptera
- Suborder: Polyphaga
- Infraorder: Scarabaeiformia
- Family: Scarabaeidae
- Genus: Sericesthis
- Species: S. suturalis

Binomial name
- Sericesthis suturalis (MacLeay, 1871)

Synonyms
- Scitala suturalis MacLeay, 1871; Scitala pruinosella Brenske, 1900

Species of beetle

Sericesthis suturalis is a species of beetle of the family Scarabaeidae. It is found in Australia (Queensland, New South Wales).

== Description ==
Adults reach a length of about 12–15 mm (0.47–0.59 in). The clypeus is dark reddish brown, the frons darker, and the disc of the pronotum dark reddish-brown (but the lateral margins paler). The scutellum is reddish-brown (with the lateral edges dark) and the elytra are pale yellowish-brown, with the basal and sutural edges dark or black. The abdomen is yellowish-brown and the legs are reddish.
