= Homolotropus sericeus =

Scientific classification
- Kingdom: Animalia
- Phylum: Arthropoda
- Clade: Pancrustacea
- Class: Insecta
- Order: Coleoptera
- Suborder: Polyphaga
- Infraorder: Scarabaeiformia
- Family: Scarabaeidae
- Genus: Homolotropus
- Species: H. sericeus

Binomial name
- Homolotropus sericeus Britton, 1970

Species of beetle

Homolotropus sericeus is a species of beetle of the family Scarabaeidae. It is found in Australia (northern Queensland).

== Description ==
Adults reach a length of about 18–20 mm. The head is dark brown or black with metallic greenish reflections. The pronotum is yellowish brown with a small dark brown or black spot and the scutellum and elytra are yellowish brown with black punctures on the elytra. The surface has an iridescent reflection.
