= Scitala =

Scientific classification
- Kingdom: Animalia
- Phylum: Arthropoda
- Clade: Pancrustacea
- Class: Insecta
- Order: Coleoptera
- Suborder: Polyphaga
- Infraorder: Scarabaeiformia
- Family: Scarabaeidae
- Subfamily: Sericoidinae
- Tribe: Scitalini
- Genus: Scitala; Erichson, 1842

Genus of beetles

Scitala is a genus of beetles belonging to the family Scarabaeidae.

== Species ==
- Scitala aruensis Moser, 1920
- Scitala aureorufa (Blanchard, 1850)
- Scitala calescens Blackburn, 1907
- Scitala celata Britton, 1987
- Scitala citra Britton, 1987
- Scitala coracina Britton, 1987
- Scitala dispar (Blackburn, 1890)
- Scitala eremia Britton, 1987
- Scitala fustula Britton, 1987
- Scitala glabra (Blanchard, 1850)
- Scitala hirticeps (Blackburn, 1907)
- Scitala howdeni Britton, 1987
- Scitala iridipennis Britton, 1987
- Scitala juvenis Blackburn, 1907
- Scitala minuta Britton, 1987
- Scitala nana Britton, 1987
- Scitala nemesis Blackburn, 1907
- Scitala papuana Moser, 1920
- Scitala pullata (Boisduval, 1835)
- Scitala rorida Burmeister, 1855
- Scitala satelles Britton, 1987
- Scitala sericans Erichson, 1842
- Scitala simulans Britton, 1987
- Scitala sororia Britton, 1987
- Scitala uptoni Britton, 1987
- Scitala volux Britton, 1987
