= Sericesthis lutea =

Scientific classification
- Kingdom: Animalia
- Phylum: Arthropoda
- Clade: Pancrustacea
- Class: Insecta
- Order: Coleoptera
- Suborder: Polyphaga
- Infraorder: Scarabaeiformia
- Family: Scarabaeidae
- Genus: Sericesthis
- Species: S. lutea

Binomial name
- Sericesthis lutea Britton, 1987

Species of beetle

Sericesthis lutea is a species of beetle of the family Scarabaeidae. It is found in Australia (Queensland).

== Description ==
Adults reach a length of about 8 mm (0.31 in). The clypeus and margins of the pronotum are yellowish and reddish brown, while the frons and the disc of the pronotum are darker.
