= Xyroa =

Scientific classification
- Kingdom: Animalia
- Phylum: Arthropoda
- Clade: Pancrustacea
- Class: Insecta
- Order: Coleoptera
- Suborder: Polyphaga
- Infraorder: Scarabaeiformia
- Family: Scarabaeidae
- Subfamily: Sericoidinae
- Tribe: Scitalini
- Genus: Xyroa; Britton, 1987

Genus of leaf beetles

Xyroa is a genus of beetles belonging to the family Scarabaeidae.

== Species ==
- Xyroa alta Britton, 1987
- Xyroa amoena Britton, 1987
- Xyroa nitida Britton, 1987
- Xyroa polita Britton, 1987
