= Sericesthis ino =

Scientific classification
- Kingdom: Animalia
- Phylum: Arthropoda
- Clade: Pancrustacea
- Class: Insecta
- Order: Coleoptera
- Suborder: Polyphaga
- Infraorder: Scarabaeiformia
- Family: Scarabaeidae
- Genus: Sericesthis
- Species: S. ino

Binomial name
- Sericesthis ino (Blackburn, 1907)

Synonyms
- Scitala ino Blackburn, 1907

Species of beetle

Sericesthis ino is a species of beetle of the family Scarabaeidae. It is found in Australia (Queensland, New South Wales).

== Description ==
Adults reach a length of about 9 mm (0.35 in). The head and pronotum are pale reddish yellow, while the elytra and abdomen are paler yellowish brown.
