= Scitala minuta =

Scientific classification
- Kingdom: Animalia
- Phylum: Arthropoda
- Clade: Pancrustacea
- Class: Insecta
- Order: Coleoptera
- Suborder: Polyphaga
- Infraorder: Scarabaeiformia
- Family: Scarabaeidae
- Genus: Scitala
- Species: S. minuta

Binomial name
- Scitala minuta Britton, 1987

Species of beetle

Scitala minuta is a species of beetle of the family Scarabaeidae. It is found in Australia (Western Australia).

== Description ==
Adults reach a length of about 5.5 mm (0.22 in). The body and legs are reddish brown. The disc of the pronotum is densely punctured and the scutellum is coarsely punctured. The elytra are more sparsely punctured, and each puncture bears a minute seta.
