= Hadrops flavus =

Scientific classification
- Kingdom: Animalia
- Phylum: Arthropoda
- Clade: Pancrustacea
- Class: Insecta
- Order: Coleoptera
- Suborder: Polyphaga
- Infraorder: Scarabaeiformia
- Family: Scarabaeidae
- Genus: Hadrops
- Species: H. flavus

Binomial name
- Hadrops flavus (Lea, 1919)

Synonyms
- Engyops flavus Lea, 1919

Species of beetle

Hadrops flavus is a species of beetle of the family Scarabaeidae. It is found in Australia (Queensland).

== Description ==
Adults reach a length of about 8.5–10 mm (0.33–0.39 in). The clypeus is reddish brown, while the remainder of the body is yellowish-brown, but the legs with the coxae and femora yellowish, and the tibiae and tarsi brown.
