= Sericesthis antennalis =

Scientific classification
- Kingdom: Animalia
- Phylum: Arthropoda
- Clade: Pancrustacea
- Class: Insecta
- Order: Coleoptera
- Suborder: Polyphaga
- Infraorder: Scarabaeiformia
- Family: Scarabaeidae
- Genus: Sericesthis
- Species: S. antennalis

Binomial name
- Sericesthis antennalis (Blackburn, 1907)

Synonyms
- Anodontonyx antennalis Blackburn, 1907

Species of beetle

Sericesthis antennalis is a species of beetle of the family Scarabaeidae. It is found in Australia (New South Wales, Victoria).

== Description ==
Adults reach a length of about 8–10 mm (0.31–0.39 in). The elytra are reddish brown and very slightly sericeous, while the head and pronotum are slightly darker reddish brown. The abdomen is yellowish brown.
