= Colpochilodes =

Scientific classification
- Kingdom: Animalia
- Phylum: Arthropoda
- Clade: Pancrustacea
- Class: Insecta
- Order: Coleoptera
- Suborder: Polyphaga
- Infraorder: Scarabaeiformia
- Family: Scarabaeidae
- Subfamily: Sericoidinae
- Tribe: Scitalini
- Genus: Colpochilodes; Blackburn, 1898

Genus of beetles

Colpochilodes is a genus of beetles belonging to the family Scarabaeidae.

== Species ==
- Colpochilodes peregrina Britton, 1987
- Colpochilodes raucipennis Blackburn, 1898
