= Scitala aruensis =

Scientific classification
- Kingdom: Animalia
- Phylum: Arthropoda
- Clade: Pancrustacea
- Class: Insecta
- Order: Coleoptera
- Suborder: Polyphaga
- Infraorder: Scarabaeiformia
- Family: Scarabaeidae
- Genus: Scitala
- Species: S. aruensis

Binomial name
- Scitala aruensis Moser, 1920

Species of beetle

Scitala aruensis is a species of beetle of the family Scarabaeidae. It is found in Indonesia (Aru Island).

== Description ==
Adults reach a length of about 13.5 mm (0.53 in). They have an oblong, chestnut brown, shiny body. The head is sparsely punctate. The antennae are tawny. The pronotum punctate, the scutellum is smooth and the elytra moderately densely and irregularly punctured.
