= Sericesthis iris =

Scientific classification
- Kingdom: Animalia
- Phylum: Arthropoda
- Clade: Pancrustacea
- Class: Insecta
- Order: Coleoptera
- Suborder: Polyphaga
- Infraorder: Scarabaeiformia
- Family: Scarabaeidae
- Genus: Sericesthis
- Species: S. iris

Binomial name
- Sericesthis iris Britton, 1987

Species of beetle

Sericesthis iris is a species of beetle of the family Scarabaeidae. It is found in Australia (New South Wales, Queensland).

== Description ==
Adults reach a length of about 15–17 mm (0.59–0.67 in). The dorsal surface is dark reddish brown with strong iridescent reflections, while the ventral surface is yellowish brown.
