= Sericesthis storeyi =

Scientific classification
- Kingdom: Animalia
- Phylum: Arthropoda
- Clade: Pancrustacea
- Class: Insecta
- Order: Coleoptera
- Suborder: Polyphaga
- Infraorder: Scarabaeiformia
- Family: Scarabaeidae
- Genus: Sericesthis
- Species: S. storeyi

Binomial name
- Sericesthis storeyi Britton, 1987

Species of beetle

Sericesthis storeyi is a species of beetle of the family Scarabaeidae. It is found in Australia (Queensland).

== Description ==
Adults reach a length of about 11–12 mm (0.43–0.47 in). The dorsal surface is dark reddish brown and the lateral margins of the pronotum and elytra are paler and reddish. The ventral surface is bright reddish.

== Etymology ==
The species is named for its collector, R. I. Storey.
