= Xyroa alta =

Scientific classification
- Kingdom: Animalia
- Phylum: Arthropoda
- Clade: Pancrustacea
- Class: Insecta
- Order: Coleoptera
- Suborder: Polyphaga
- Infraorder: Scarabaeiformia
- Family: Scarabaeidae
- Genus: Xyroa
- Species: X. alta

Binomial name
- Xyroa alta Britton, 1987

Species of beetle

Xyroa alta is a species of beetle of the family Scarabaeidae. It is found in Australia (Queensland).

== Description ==
Adults reach a length of about 15 mm (0.59 in). They are dark reddish brown. The clypeus and frons are densely punctured, the scutellum is almost impunctate and the elytra are sparsely punctured.
