= Sericesthis incola =

Scientific classification
- Kingdom: Animalia
- Phylum: Arthropoda
- Clade: Pancrustacea
- Class: Insecta
- Order: Coleoptera
- Suborder: Polyphaga
- Infraorder: Scarabaeiformia
- Family: Scarabaeidae
- Genus: Sericesthis
- Species: S. incola

Binomial name
- Sericesthis incola Britton, 1987

Species of beetle

Sericesthis incola is a species of beetle of the family Scarabaeidae. It is found in Australia (New South Wales).

== Description ==
Adults reach a length of about 9–10 mm (0.35–0.39 in). The head is dark reddish, while the pronotum and elytra are pale reddish and the ventral surface and legs are reddish to yellowish brown.
