= Paraschizognathus miskoi =

Scientific classification
- Kingdom: Animalia
- Phylum: Arthropoda
- Class: Insecta
- Order: Coleoptera
- Suborder: Polyphaga
- Infraorder: Scarabaeiformia
- Family: Scarabaeidae
- Genus: Paraschizognathus
- Species: P. miskoi

Binomial name
- Paraschizognathus miskoi Carne, 1974

Australian species of beetle

Paraschizognathus miskoi is an Australian species of beetle (Coleoptera) in the genus Paraschizognathus and family Scarabaeidae. It was described by Phillip B. Carne in 1974, and named in honor of Ukrainian-Australian entomologist and artist Stefan Misko.

The species is limited in its distribution to east New South Wales — the holotype was collected by Stefan Misko and Everard Baldwin Britton from Apsley Falls in the Northern Tablelands region of New South Wales. The beetles are medium brown in color, they are nocturnal and are attracted to lights.
