= Stefan Misko =

Ukrainian-Australian entomologist and painter (1912–1986)

- Степан Місько
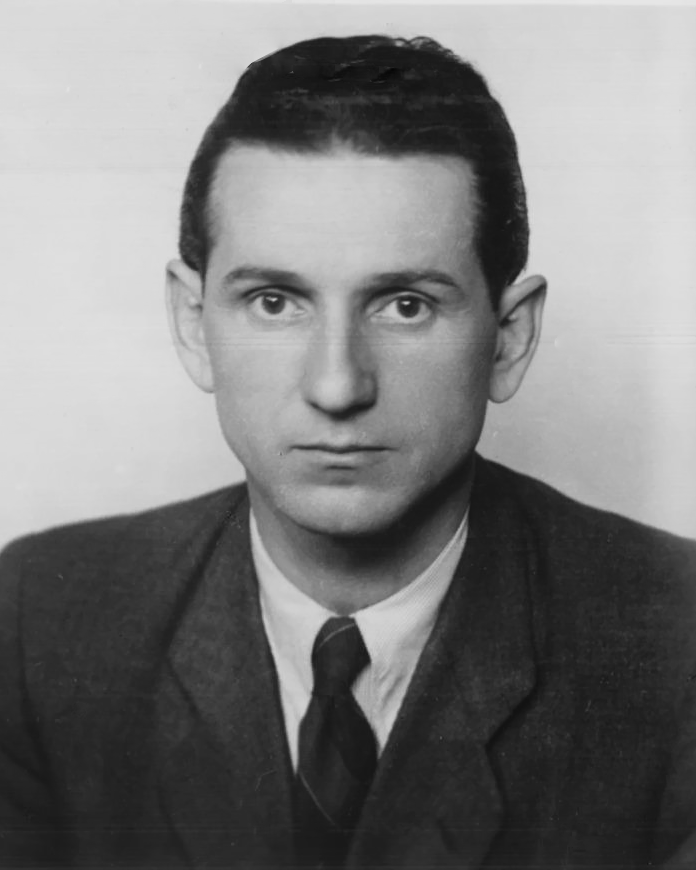
- Stefan Misko in 1949.
- Born: March 25, 1912; Lviv
- Died: May 18, 1986 (aged 74); Canberra
- Resting place: Gungahlin Cemetery, Canberra
- Style: expressionist
- Spouse: Iwanna
- Children: Orysia, Ihor

Stefan Misko (Ukrainian: Степан Місько, 25 March 1912, Lviv — 18 April 1986, Canberra) was a Ukrainian-born entomologist, painter and community leader who lived and worked in Australia. He was founder and president of the Ukrainian Artists Society of Australia and was director-owner of an art gallery in Canberra.

== Biography ==
Stefan Misko was born on 25 February in Lviv. After completing studies at the Lviv Polytechnic, he graduated on 6 July 1947 with qualifications as forestry-engineer from the Ukrainian Technical and Husbandry Institute in Regensburg — with his dissertation "Forestry in Oak Forests".

== Work and life in Australia ==
After World War II, Misko emigrated to Australia together with his family as a displaced person, arriving on the USS General W. C. Langfitt on the 16 June 1949. He lived in Melbourne until 1961, later moving ton Canberra, where he worked in the entomology section of the Commonwealth Scientific and Industrial Research Organisation (CSIRO).

As part of this work at the CSIRO he frequently travelled with Dr. Everard Baldwin Britton searching for species of beetles for the Australian National Insect Collection in Canberra. He discovered new species of Australian beetle, that were named after him: Sericesthis miskoi, and Paraschizognathus miskoi. The beetle genera Miskoramus is also named in memory of him.

He was active as a youth leader in Victoria, founding a sporting club and soccer team "Ukraine" (1952). He was active politically in the Australian-Ukrainian community, organising festivals and protests, including the demonstrations supporting the freeing of Ukrainian dissident Yurii Shukhevych (1968). He founded and was president of the Canberra branch of the Shevchenko Scientific Society (1974–1979).

== Artwork ==
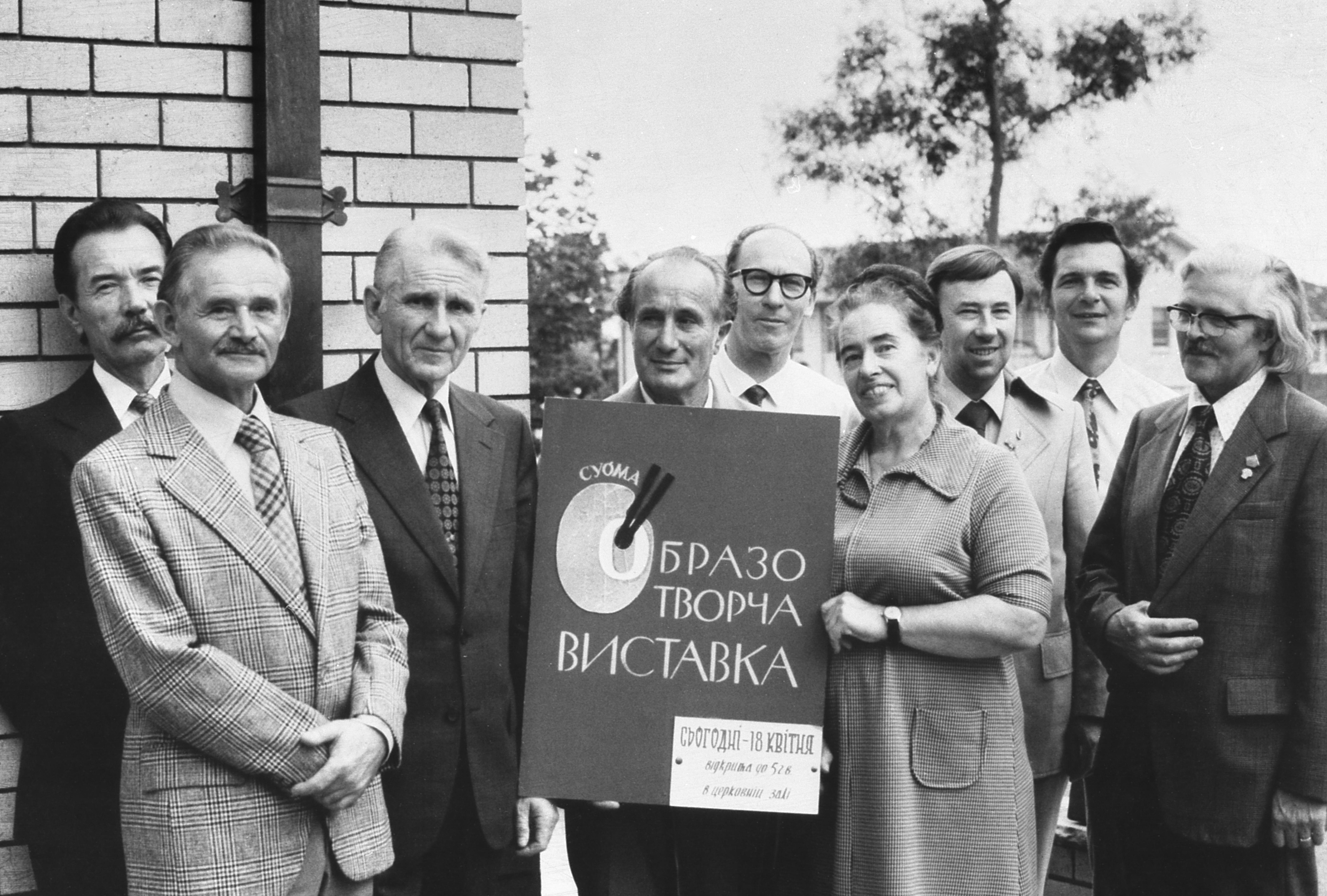
Members of the Ukrainian Artists Society of Australia at their annual exhibition, Lidcombe, NSW in 1976. Stefan Misko is 3rd from left.

As and expressionist painter, Misko painted mainly in watercolors, but also in oil, pastel and charcoal. He was director-owner of the Misko Art Studio Gallery in Canberra and was founder and long-time president of the Ukrainian Artists Society of Australia (1967-1986).

=== Exhibitions ===
- Daramalan Art Exhibition, Canberra 1964
- Daramalan Art Exhibition, Canberra 1965
- Canberra Theatre Centre Gallery, Canberra 1967
- Ukrainian Culture Centre, Lidcombe 1968
- Discovery Art Gallery, Canberra 1969
- Ukrainian House, Essendon, Melbourne 1971
- Canberra Theatre Centre Gallery, Canberra 1972
- Adelaide Festival Exhibition, Adelaide 1973
- Ukrainian Culture Centre, Lidcombe, Sydney 1976
- St Peter Chanel's School, Canberra 1977
- One-man Exhibition of 71 paintings, Misko Art Studio Gallery, Canberra 1978
- Canberra Art Gallery, Canberra 1980
- Ukrainian Culture Centre, Lidcombe, Sydney 1981
- Macquarie University Gallery, Sydney 1981
- Canberra Theatre Centre, Canberra 1982
- Retrospective Exhibition, Canberra Theatre Centre Gallery, Canberra 1982

His works are represented Widely in private collections in Australia and overseas.
