= Miskoramus =

Scientific classification
- Kingdom: Animalia
- Phylum: Arthropoda
- Class: Insecta
- Order: Coleoptera
- Suborder: Polyphaga
- Infraorder: Cucujiformia
- Family: Nitidulidae
- Genus: Miskoramus; Kirejtshuk & Lawrence, 1992

Genus of beetles

Miskoramus is a genus of sap-feeding beetles in the family Nitidulidae, first described in 1992 by A. G. Kirejtshuk and J. F. Lawrence. The generic name is formed from the surname Misko, in memory of Stefan Misko, an entomologiest at the CSIRO and also a well-known artist and member of Canberra's Ukrainian community.

Only one species is described: Miskoramus pulcher, known only from the vicinity of Port Macquarie, New South Wales.

== Description ==
The body of Miskoramus pulcher is a shiny reddish-brown and the legs yellowi-red. Little is known of the life-cycle of the beetle, though a related species is a predator of wattle tick scale (Cryptes baccatus), and the physical features of M. pulcher also suggest protection mechanisms for survival in close proximity with aggressive ant species.
