= Sericesthis insularis =

Scientific classification
- Kingdom: Animalia
- Phylum: Arthropoda
- Clade: Pancrustacea
- Class: Insecta
- Order: Coleoptera
- Suborder: Polyphaga
- Infraorder: Scarabaeiformia
- Family: Scarabaeidae
- Genus: Sericesthis
- Species: S. insularis

Binomial name
- Sericesthis insularis (Lea, 1919)

Synonyms
- Anodontonyx insularis Lea, 1919

Species of beetle

Sericesthis insularis is a species of beetle of the family Scarabaeidae. It is found in Australia (Queensland).

== Description ==
Adults reach a length of about 8 mm (0.31 in). The frons and the disc of the pronotum are brown, while the clypeus, margins of the pronotum, scutellum, elytra, ventral surface and legs are all yellowish brown. The surface of the pronotum and elytra is slightly sericeous.
