= Xyroa amoena =

Scientific classification
- Kingdom: Animalia
- Phylum: Arthropoda
- Clade: Pancrustacea
- Class: Insecta
- Order: Coleoptera
- Suborder: Polyphaga
- Infraorder: Scarabaeiformia
- Family: Scarabaeidae
- Genus: Xyroa
- Species: X. amoena

Binomial name
- Xyroa amoena Britton, 1987

Species of beetle

Xyroa amoena is a species of beetle of the family Scarabaeidae. It is found in Australia (Queensland).

== Description ==
Adults reach a length of about 11–13 mm (0.43–0.51 in). They are castaneous, with a shining dorsal surface.
