= Homolotropus =

Scientific classification
- Kingdom: Animalia
- Phylum: Arthropoda
- Clade: Pancrustacea
- Class: Insecta
- Order: Coleoptera
- Suborder: Polyphaga
- Infraorder: Scarabaeiformia
- Family: Scarabaeidae
- Subfamily: Sericoidinae
- Tribe: Scitalini
- Genus: Homolotropus; MacLeay, 1871

Genus of leaf beetles

Homolotropus is a genus of beetles belonging to the family Scarabaeidae.

== Species ==
- Homolotropus luridipennis MacLeay, 1871
- Homolotropus metallicus Britton, 1970
- Homolotropus sagus Britton, 1970
- Homolotropus sericeus Britton, 1970
- Homolotropus taylori Britton, 1970
