= Homolotropus luridipennis =

Scientific classification
- Kingdom: Animalia
- Phylum: Arthropoda
- Clade: Pancrustacea
- Class: Insecta
- Order: Coleoptera
- Suborder: Polyphaga
- Infraorder: Scarabaeiformia
- Family: Scarabaeidae
- Genus: Homolotropus
- Species: H. luridipennis

Binomial name
- Homolotropus luridipennis MacLeay, 1871

Species of beetle

Homolotropus luridipennis is a species of beetle of the family Scarabaeidae. It is found in Australia (southern Queensland).

== Description ==
Adults reach a length of about 17 mm. They have a dark brown or black head, with a metallic purple reflection. The pronotum is yellowish-brown with the anterior and posterior edges black and metallic, and with a black spot and black punctures on the disc. The elytra are yellowish brown with a black basal declivity, while the lateral and apical declivities are yellowish brown. The ventral surface and legs are brown or dark brown, with metallic greenish reflections.
