= Sericesthis serena =

Scientific classification
- Kingdom: Animalia
- Phylum: Arthropoda
- Clade: Pancrustacea
- Class: Insecta
- Order: Coleoptera
- Suborder: Polyphaga
- Infraorder: Scarabaeiformia
- Family: Scarabaeidae
- Genus: Sericesthis
- Species: S. serena

Binomial name
- Sericesthis serena Britton, 1987

Species of beetle

Sericesthis serena is a species of beetle of the family Scarabaeidae. It is found in Australia (Queensland).

== Description ==
Adults reach a length of about 13–16 mm (0.51–0.63 in). The frons is dark brown, while the remainder of the dorsal surface is reddish brown. The abdomen is yellowish brown.
