= Telura monticola =

Scientific classification
- Kingdom: Animalia
- Phylum: Arthropoda
- Clade: Pancrustacea
- Class: Insecta
- Order: Coleoptera
- Suborder: Polyphaga
- Infraorder: Scarabaeiformia
- Family: Scarabaeidae
- Genus: Telura
- Species: T. monticola

Binomial name
- Telura monticola Britton, 1987

Species of beetle

Telura monticola is a species of beetle of the family Scarabaeidae. It is found in Australia (Victoria, the Australian Capital Territory, New South Wales).

== Description ==
They can be distinguished from the other Telura species by the form of the aedeagus.
