= Colpochilodes peregrina =

Scientific classification
- Kingdom: Animalia
- Phylum: Arthropoda
- Clade: Pancrustacea
- Class: Insecta
- Order: Coleoptera
- Suborder: Polyphaga
- Infraorder: Scarabaeiformia
- Family: Scarabaeidae
- Genus: Colpochilodes
- Species: C. peregrina

Binomial name
- Colpochilodes peregrina Britton, 1987

Species of beetle

Colpochilodes peregrina is a species of beetle of the family Scarabaeidae. It is found in Australia (South Australia, Western Australia, Victoria, Tasmania).

== Description ==
Adults reach a length of about 13–19 mm (0.51–0.75 in). The head and pronotum are shining and castaneous, while the scutellum and elytra are paler reddish brown with surface mostly shining.
