= Sericesthis consanguinea =

Scientific classification
- Kingdom: Animalia
- Phylum: Arthropoda
- Clade: Pancrustacea
- Class: Insecta
- Order: Coleoptera
- Suborder: Polyphaga
- Infraorder: Scarabaeiformia
- Family: Scarabaeidae
- Genus: Sericesthis
- Species: S. consanguinea

Binomial name
- Sericesthis consanguinea (Blackburn, 1907)

Synonyms
- Anodontonyx consanguineus Blackburn, 1907; Anodontonyx noxius Arrow, 1932

Species of beetle

Sericesthis consanguinea, the wheat root scarab, is a species of beetle of the family Scarabaeidae. It is found in Australia (Victoria, New South Wales, Australian Capital Territory, Tasmania).

== Description ==
Adults reach a length of about 9–11 mm (0.35–0.43 in). The frons, pronotum, scutellum, elytra and ventral surface are black, while the anterior margin of the clypeus is reddish brown and the rest black. The antennae are pale yellowish-brown. The anterior legs are reddish brown and the remainder of the legs dark brown or black.

== Life history ==
The larvae are a pest of wheat and oats.
