= Scitala nana =

Scientific classification
- Kingdom: Animalia
- Phylum: Arthropoda
- Clade: Pancrustacea
- Class: Insecta
- Order: Coleoptera
- Suborder: Polyphaga
- Infraorder: Scarabaeiformia
- Family: Scarabaeidae
- Genus: Scitala
- Species: S. nana

Binomial name
- Scitala nana Britton, 1987

Species of beetle

Scitala nana is a species of beetle of the family Scarabaeidae. It is found in Australia (New South Wales).

== Description ==
Adults reach a length of about 6.5–9 mm (0.26–0.35 in). They are reddish brown, with the frons and disc of the pronotum dark brown. The elytra are mottled with darker brown. The clypeus has two setiferous punctures, and the pronotum has several. It, and the frons are sparsely punctured, while the elytra are coarsely and more densely punctured.
