= Idanastes =

Scientific classification
- Kingdom: Animalia
- Phylum: Arthropoda
- Clade: Pancrustacea
- Class: Insecta
- Order: Coleoptera
- Suborder: Polyphaga
- Infraorder: Scarabaeiformia
- Family: Scarabaeidae
- Subfamily: Sericoidinae
- Tribe: Scitalini
- Genus: Idanastes; Britton, 1987
- Species: I. abditus

Binomial name
- Idanastes abditus Britton, 1987

Genus of beetles

Idanastes is a genus of beetle of the family Scarabaeidae. It is monotypic, being represented by the single species, Idanastes abditus, which is found in Australia (Queensland).

== Description ==
Adults reach a length of about 8 mm (0.31 in). They are entirely reddish brown, with the surface densely punctured.
