= Colpochilodes raucipennis =

Scientific classification
- Kingdom: Animalia
- Phylum: Arthropoda
- Clade: Pancrustacea
- Class: Insecta
- Order: Coleoptera
- Suborder: Polyphaga
- Infraorder: Scarabaeiformia
- Family: Scarabaeidae
- Genus: Colpochilodes
- Species: C. raucipennis

Binomial name
- Colpochilodes raucipennis Blackburn, 1898

Species of beetle

Colpochilodes raucipennis is a species of beetle of the family Scarabaeidae. It is found in Australia (Western Australia).

== Description ==
Adults reach a length of about 16–20 mm (0.63–0.79 in). They are dark reddish brown. The lateral margins of the pronotum have a few setiferous punctures and the surface is sparsely punctured, and is shining between these punctures. Some intervals on the elytra are sparsely punctured, while the alternate intervals are more densely punctured. The surface of the elytra is mostly shining and the lateral and apical edges are edged with pale yellow. The pygidium is sparsely punctured and has a fringe of pale yellow setae at the apex.
