= Sericesthis egens =

Scientific classification
- Kingdom: Animalia
- Phylum: Arthropoda
- Clade: Pancrustacea
- Class: Insecta
- Order: Coleoptera
- Suborder: Polyphaga
- Infraorder: Scarabaeiformia
- Family: Scarabaeidae
- Genus: Sericesthis
- Species: S. egens

Binomial name
- Sericesthis egens Britton, 1987

Species of beetle

Sericesthis egens is a species of beetle of the family Scarabaeidae. It is found in Australia (New South Wales).

== Description ==
Adults reach a length of about 13 mm (0.51 in). They are pale reddish brown. The pronotum and scutellum are sparsely punctured. The upper surface is shining.
