= Scitala citra =

Scientific classification
- Kingdom: Animalia
- Phylum: Arthropoda
- Clade: Pancrustacea
- Class: Insecta
- Order: Coleoptera
- Suborder: Polyphaga
- Infraorder: Scarabaeiformia
- Family: Scarabaeidae
- Genus: Scitala
- Species: S. citra

Binomial name
- Scitala citra Britton, 1987

Species of beetle

Scitala citra is a species of beetle of the family Scarabaeidae. It is found in Australia (South Australia).

== Description ==
Adults reach a length of about 10–12 mm (0.39–0.47 in). The head and pronotum are dark reddish brown, while the elytra are paler reddish brown.
