= Sericesthis elderi =

Scientific classification
- Kingdom: Animalia
- Phylum: Arthropoda
- Clade: Pancrustacea
- Class: Insecta
- Order: Coleoptera
- Suborder: Polyphaga
- Infraorder: Scarabaeiformia
- Family: Scarabaeidae
- Genus: Sericesthis
- Species: S. elderi

Binomial name
- Sericesthis elderi Britton, 1987

Species of beetle

Sericesthis elderi is a species of beetle of the family Scarabaeidae. It is found in Australia (Queensland).

== Description ==
Adults reach a length of about 9–12 mm (0.35–0.47 in). The head is reddish brown, while the pronotum and elytra are yellowish brown, shining and not iridescent.

== Etymology ==
The species is named for its collector, R. J. Elder.
