= Sericesthis cinnamea =

Scientific classification
- Kingdom: Animalia
- Phylum: Arthropoda
- Clade: Pancrustacea
- Class: Insecta
- Order: Coleoptera
- Suborder: Polyphaga
- Infraorder: Scarabaeiformia
- Family: Scarabaeidae
- Genus: Sericesthis
- Species: S. cinnamea

Binomial name
- Sericesthis cinnamea Britton, 1987

Species of beetle

Sericesthis cinnamea is a species of beetle of the family Scarabaeidae. It is found in Australia (New South Wales).

== Description ==
Adults reach a length of about 9–12 mm (0.35–0.47 in). They are yellowish brown and slightly iridescent.
