= Sericesthis rectangula =

Scientific classification
- Kingdom: Animalia
- Phylum: Arthropoda
- Clade: Pancrustacea
- Class: Insecta
- Order: Coleoptera
- Suborder: Polyphaga
- Infraorder: Scarabaeiformia
- Family: Scarabaeidae
- Genus: Sericesthis
- Species: S. rectangula

Binomial name
- Sericesthis rectangula (Blackburn, 1907)

Synonyms
- Anodontonyx rectangulus Blackburn, 1907

Species of beetle

Sericesthis rectangula is a species of beetle of the family Scarabaeidae. It is found in Australia (New South Wales).

== Description ==
Adults reach a length of about 9 mm (0.35 in). The head, pronotum and scutellum are reddish brown, while the elytra are slightly paler, with the surface between punctures shining and slightly iridescent.
