= Scitala coracina =

Scientific classification
- Kingdom: Animalia
- Phylum: Arthropoda
- Clade: Pancrustacea
- Class: Insecta
- Order: Coleoptera
- Suborder: Polyphaga
- Infraorder: Scarabaeiformia
- Family: Scarabaeidae
- Genus: Scitala
- Species: S. coracina

Binomial name
- Scitala coracina Britton, 1987

Species of beetle

Scitala coracina is a species of beetle of the family Scarabaeidae. It is found in Australia (Western Australia).

== Description ==
Adults reach a length of about 11 mm (0.43 in). The body is black, with the elytra iridescent. The legs are also black, except for the tarsi, which are piceous. The antennae and palpi are reddish brown.
