= Sericesthis nemoralis =

Scientific classification
- Kingdom: Animalia
- Phylum: Arthropoda
- Clade: Pancrustacea
- Class: Insecta
- Order: Coleoptera
- Suborder: Polyphaga
- Infraorder: Scarabaeiformia
- Family: Scarabaeidae
- Genus: Sericesthis
- Species: S. nemoralis

Binomial name
- Sericesthis nemoralis (Blackburn, 1907)

Synonyms
- Scitala nemoralis Blackburn, 1907; Scitala convexicollis Blackburn, 1907

Species of beetle

Sericesthis nemoralis is a species of beetle of the family Scarabaeidae. It is found in Australia (New South Wales, Victoria).

== Description ==
Adults reach a length of about 9–11 mm (0.35–0.43 in). The head and pronotum are reddish brown, while the elytra are yellowish brown.
