= Xyrine carnei =

Scientific classification
- Kingdom: Animalia
- Phylum: Arthropoda
- Clade: Pancrustacea
- Class: Insecta
- Order: Coleoptera
- Suborder: Polyphaga
- Infraorder: Scarabaeiformia
- Family: Scarabaeidae
- Genus: Xyrine
- Species: X. carnei

Binomial name
- Xyrine carnei Britton, 1987

Species of beetle

Xyrine carnei is a species of beetle of the family Scarabaeidae. It is found in Australia (New South Wales).

== Description ==
Adults reach a length of about 20 mm (0.79 in). They are bright reddish brown. The elytra have reddish-brown fringes and there are pale yellowish brown setae on the abdomen.

== Etymology ==
The species is named for its collector, Dr P. B. Carne.
