= Sericesthis fovea =

Scientific classification
- Kingdom: Animalia
- Phylum: Arthropoda
- Clade: Pancrustacea
- Class: Insecta
- Order: Coleoptera
- Suborder: Polyphaga
- Infraorder: Scarabaeiformia
- Family: Scarabaeidae
- Genus: Sericesthis
- Species: S. fovea

Binomial name
- Sericesthis fovea Britton, 1987

Species of beetle

Sericesthis fovea is a species of beetle of the family Scarabaeidae. It is found in Australia (Western Australia).

== Description ==
Adults reach a length of about 8.5 mm (0.33 in). The head, pronotum and scutellum are reddish brown, while the elytra are yellowish.
