= Ophropyx ciliata =

Scientific classification
- Kingdom: Animalia
- Phylum: Arthropoda
- Clade: Pancrustacea
- Class: Insecta
- Order: Coleoptera
- Suborder: Polyphaga
- Infraorder: Scarabaeiformia
- Family: Scarabaeidae
- Genus: Ophropyx
- Species: O. ciliata

Binomial name
- Ophropyx ciliata (Boisduval, 1835)

Synonyms
- Melolontha ciliata Boisduval, 1835; Frenchella aspericollis Blackburn, 1898; Haplonycha rugosa Burmeister, 1855

Species of beetle

Ophropyx ciliata is a species of beetle of the family Scarabaeidae. It is found in Australia (Queensland, New South Wales).

== Description ==
Adults reach a length of about 11–15 mm (0.43–0.59 in). The body and legs are reddish brown to black, often with the head and pronotum darker than the rear of the body. The antennae and palpi are pale reddish brown.
