= Byrrhomorpha verres =

Scientific classification
- Kingdom: Animalia
- Phylum: Arthropoda
- Clade: Pancrustacea
- Class: Insecta
- Order: Coleoptera
- Suborder: Polyphaga
- Infraorder: Scarabaeiformia
- Family: Scarabaeidae
- Genus: Byrrhomorpha
- Species: B. verres

Binomial name
- Byrrhomorpha verres Blackburn, 1892

Species of beetle

Byrrhomorpha verres is a species of beetle of the family Scarabaeidae. It is found in Australia (South Australia).

== Description ==
Adults reach a length of about 9–10 mm (0.35–0.39 in). The dorsal and ventral surface are black, the legs dark brown and the palpi and antennae pale yellowish brown.
