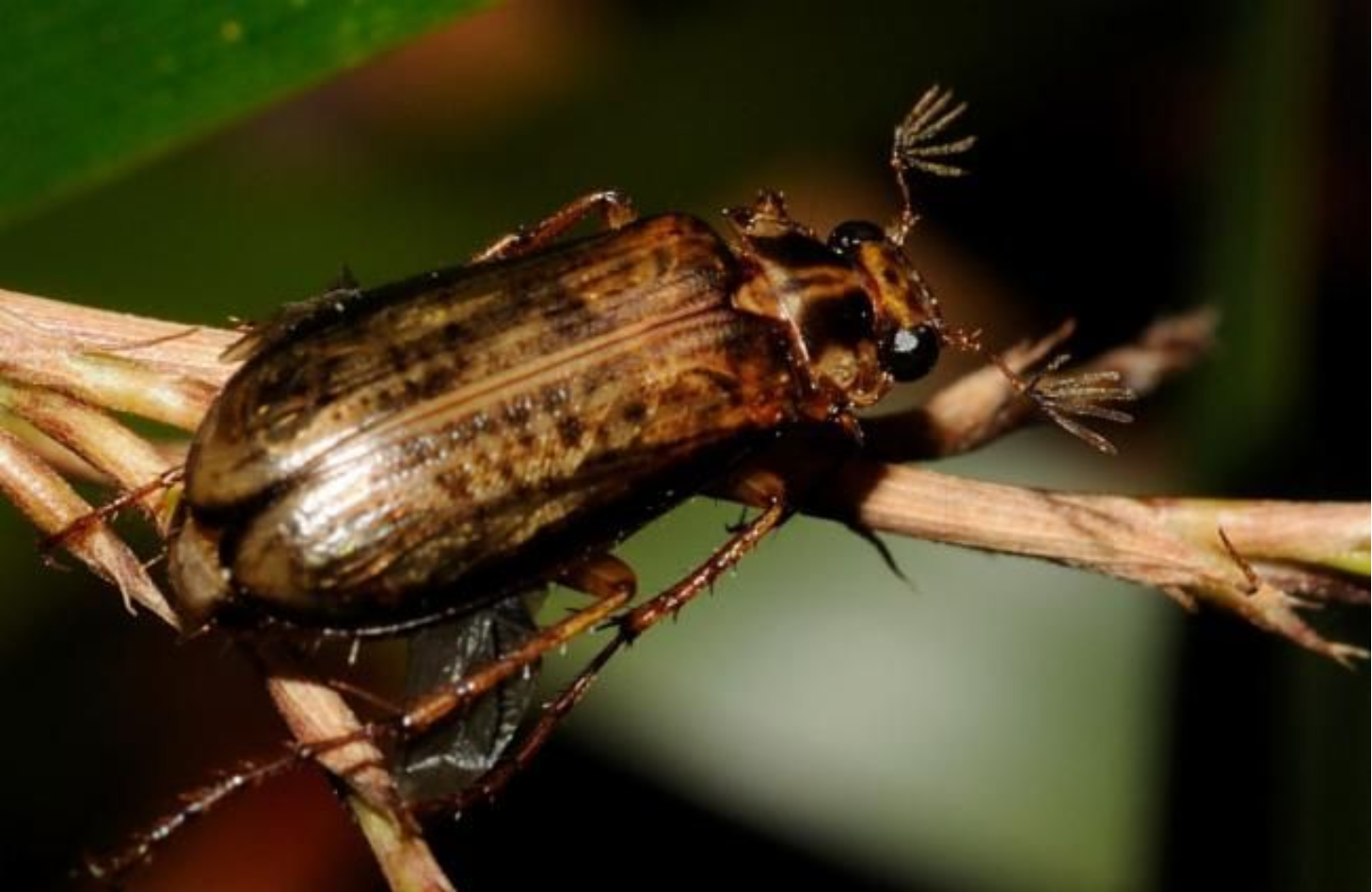

Scientific classification
- Kingdom: Animalia
- Phylum: Arthropoda
- Clade: Pancrustacea
- Class: Insecta
- Order: Coleoptera
- Suborder: Polyphaga
- Infraorder: Scarabaeiformia
- Family: Scarabaeidae
- Genus: Telura
- Species: T. vitticollis

Binomial name
- Telura vitticollis Erichson, 1842

= Telura vitticollis =

Species of beetle

Telura vitticollis is a species of beetle of the family Scarabaeidae. It is found in Australia (New South Wales, Victoria, Tasmania).

== Description ==
Adults reach a length of about 11–13 mm (0.43–0.51 in). They are pale testaceous, with the frons dark brown at the base and usually with a dark brown spot on each side of middle. The pronotum has a dark brown band on each side of middle and the elytra usually have darkened striae. They also have a pale yellowish sutural interval, as well as dark mottling, and a dark band.
