= Homolotropus sagus =

Scientific classification
- Kingdom: Animalia
- Phylum: Arthropoda
- Clade: Pancrustacea
- Class: Insecta
- Order: Coleoptera
- Suborder: Polyphaga
- Infraorder: Scarabaeiformia
- Family: Scarabaeidae
- Genus: Homolotropus
- Species: H. sagus

Binomial name
- Homolotropus sagus Britton, 1970

Species of beetle

Homolotropus sagus is a species of beetle of the family Scarabaeidae. It is found in Australia (northern Queensland).

== Description ==
Adults reach a length of about 17 mm. The frons, pronotum and scutellum are black with metallic reflections, while the elytra are dark reddish brown to black with metallic bluish reflections. The ventral surface and legs are reddish brown with a purplish metallic reflection. The head, pronotum, scutellum and elytra are densely covered with whitish setae.
