= Sericesthis stipata =

Scientific classification
- Kingdom: Animalia
- Phylum: Arthropoda
- Clade: Pancrustacea
- Class: Insecta
- Order: Coleoptera
- Suborder: Polyphaga
- Infraorder: Scarabaeiformia
- Family: Scarabaeidae
- Genus: Sericesthis
- Species: S. stipata

Binomial name
- Sericesthis stipata Britton, 1987

Species of beetle

Sericesthis stipata is a species of beetle of the family Scarabaeidae. It is found in Australia (Queensland).

== Description ==
Adults reach a length of about 11 mm (0.43 in). The head and pronotum are dark brown, while the elytra are reddish brown.
