= Scitala uptoni =

Scientific classification
- Kingdom: Animalia
- Phylum: Arthropoda
- Clade: Pancrustacea
- Class: Insecta
- Order: Coleoptera
- Suborder: Polyphaga
- Infraorder: Scarabaeiformia
- Family: Scarabaeidae
- Genus: Scitala
- Species: S. uptoni

Binomial name
- Scitala uptoni Britton, 1987

Species of beetle

Scitala uptoni is a species of beetle of the family Scarabaeidae. It is found in Australia (South Australia, Western Australia).

== Description ==
Adults reach a length of about 13–15 mm (0.51–0.59 in). They are bright reddish brown with iridescent reflections. The pronotum is finely punctured and has some setae along the anterior margin.

== Etymology ==
The species is named for a colleague of the author, Murray Upton.
