= Xyroa polita =

Scientific classification
- Kingdom: Animalia
- Phylum: Arthropoda
- Clade: Pancrustacea
- Class: Insecta
- Order: Coleoptera
- Suborder: Polyphaga
- Infraorder: Scarabaeiformia
- Family: Scarabaeidae
- Genus: Xyroa
- Species: X. polita

Binomial name
- Xyroa polita Britton, 1987

Species of beetle

Xyroa polita is a species of beetle of the family Scarabaeidae. It is found in Australia (Queensland).

== Description ==
Adults reach a length of about 14–16 mm (0.55–0.63 in). The body and legs are dark reddish brown.
