= Scitala dispar =

Scientific classification
- Kingdom: Animalia
- Phylum: Arthropoda
- Clade: Pancrustacea
- Class: Insecta
- Order: Coleoptera
- Suborder: Polyphaga
- Infraorder: Scarabaeiformia
- Family: Scarabaeidae
- Genus: Scitala
- Species: S. dispar

Binomial name
- Scitala dispar (Blackburn, 1890)

Synonyms
- Sericesthis dispar Blackburn, 1890

Species of beetle

Scitala dispar is a species of beetle of the family Scarabaeidae. It is found in Australia (South Australia).

== Description ==
Adults reach a length of about 9–10 mm (0.35–0.39 in). The head and pronotum are dark brown to black, while the elytra are dark brown and the antennae and legs are reddish brown.
