= Sericesthis erosa =

Scientific classification
- Kingdom: Animalia
- Phylum: Arthropoda
- Clade: Pancrustacea
- Class: Insecta
- Order: Coleoptera
- Suborder: Polyphaga
- Infraorder: Scarabaeiformia
- Family: Scarabaeidae
- Genus: Sericesthis
- Species: S. erosa

Binomial name
- Sericesthis erosa Blackburn, 1890

Synonyms
- Sericesthis puncticollis Blackburn, 1890

Species of beetle

Sericesthis erosa is a species of beetle of the family Scarabaeidae. It is found in Australia (South Australia).

== Description ==
Adults reach a length of about 9 mm (0.35 in). They are dark brown or black, with the frons and pronotum darker than the elytra.
