= Sericesthis incisa =

Scientific classification
- Kingdom: Animalia
- Phylum: Arthropoda
- Clade: Pancrustacea
- Class: Insecta
- Order: Coleoptera
- Suborder: Polyphaga
- Infraorder: Scarabaeiformia
- Family: Scarabaeidae
- Genus: Sericesthis
- Species: S. incisa

Binomial name
- Sericesthis incisa Britton, 1987

Species of beetle

Sericesthis incisa is a species of beetle of the family Scarabaeidae. It is found in Australia (Queensland).

== Description ==
Adults reach a length of about 11 mm (0.43 in). The head, pronotum and elytra are dark reddish brown, while the ventral surface and legs are brighter reddish brown. The antennae are reddish brown.
