= Sericesthis magna =

Scientific classification
- Kingdom: Animalia
- Phylum: Arthropoda
- Clade: Pancrustacea
- Class: Insecta
- Order: Coleoptera
- Suborder: Polyphaga
- Infraorder: Scarabaeiformia
- Family: Scarabaeidae
- Genus: Sericesthis
- Species: S. magna

Binomial name
- Sericesthis magna Britton, 1987

Species of beetle

Sericesthis magna is a species of beetle of the family Scarabaeidae. It is found in Queensland, Australia.

== Description ==
Adults reach a length of about 17–19 mm (0.67–0.75 in). The head, pronotum and scutellum are dark brown with iridescent reflections, while the elytra are dark brown mottled with light brown around the punctures and also with an iridescent reflection.
