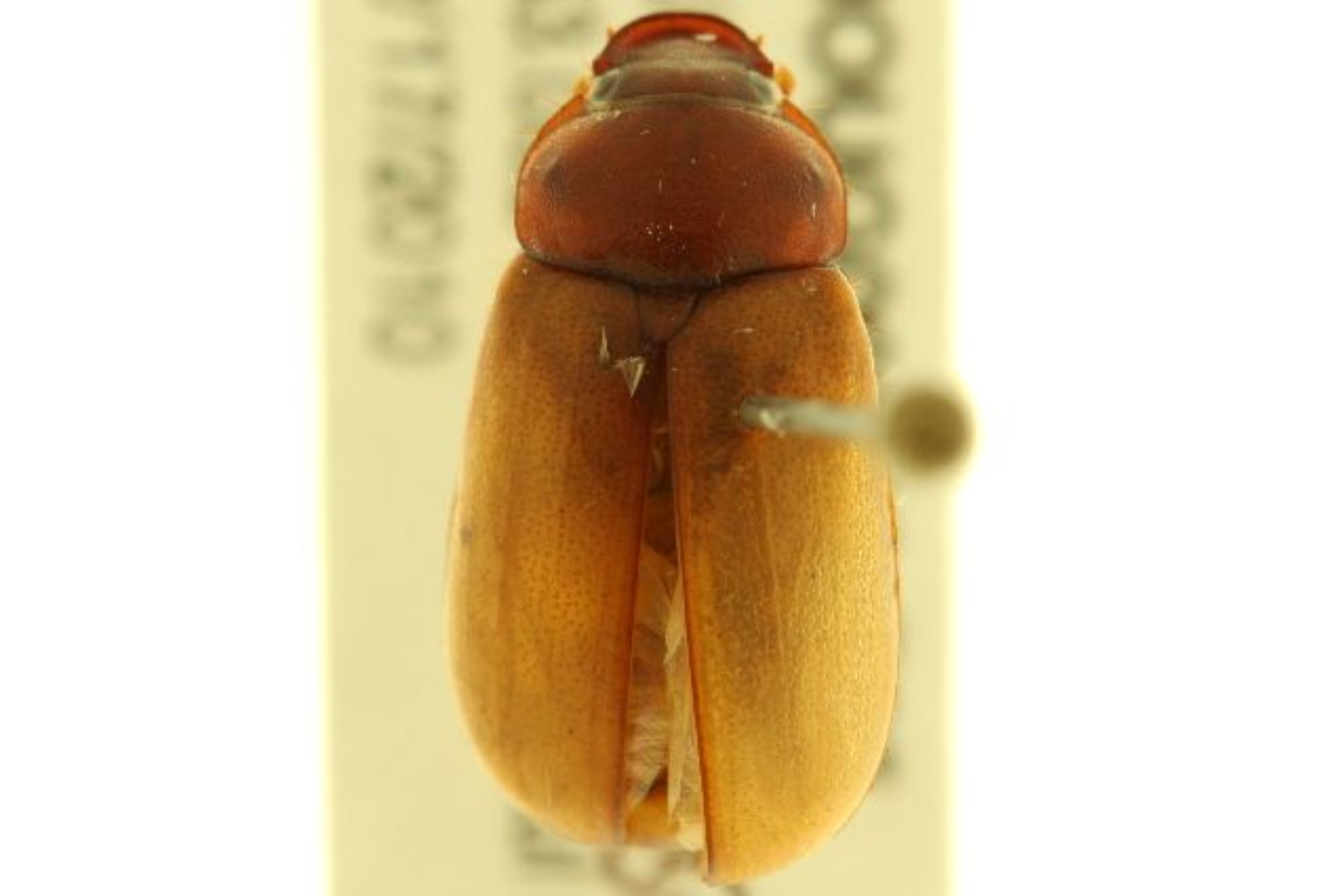

Scientific classification
- Kingdom: Animalia
- Phylum: Arthropoda
- Clade: Pancrustacea
- Class: Insecta
- Order: Coleoptera
- Suborder: Polyphaga
- Infraorder: Scarabaeiformia
- Family: Scarabaeidae
- Genus: Sericesthis
- Species: S. vigilans

Binomial name
- Sericesthis vigilans (Sharp, 1890)

Synonyms
- Anodontonyx vigilans Sharp, 1890; Anodontonyx chalceus Blackburn, 1907

= Sericesthis vigilans =

Species of beetle

Sericesthis vigilans is a species of beetle of the family Scarabaeidae. It is found in Australia (New South Wales, Queensland, Victoria).

== Description ==
Adults reach a length of about 9–13 mm (0.35–0.51 in). They are uniform reddish brown.
