= Sericesthis anepsia =

Scientific classification
- Kingdom: Animalia
- Phylum: Arthropoda
- Clade: Pancrustacea
- Class: Insecta
- Order: Coleoptera
- Suborder: Polyphaga
- Infraorder: Scarabaeiformia
- Family: Scarabaeidae
- Genus: Sericesthis
- Species: S. anepsia

Binomial name
- Sericesthis anepsia Britton, 1987

Species of beetle

Sericesthis anepsia is a species of beetle of the family Scarabaeidae. It is found in Australia (Queensland).

== Description ==
Adults reach a length of about 8–11 mm (0.31–0.43 in). They are dark reddish brown, with two setiferous punctures on the frons.
