= Sericesthis harti =

Scientific classification
- Kingdom: Animalia
- Phylum: Arthropoda
- Clade: Pancrustacea
- Class: Insecta
- Order: Coleoptera
- Suborder: Polyphaga
- Infraorder: Scarabaeiformia
- Family: Scarabaeidae
- Genus: Sericesthis
- Species: S. harti

Binomial name
- Sericesthis harti (Sharp, 1890)

Synonyms
- Anodontonyx harti Sharp, 1890; Sericesthis planiceps Blackburn, 1890

Species of beetle

Sericesthis harti, the yellowhead cockchafer, is a species of beetle of the family Scarabaeidae. It is found in Australia (south-eastern South Australia, southern New South Wales, Victoria).

== Description ==
Adults reach a length of about 9–12 mm (0.35–0.47 in). They are reddish brown to dark brown or black, usually with the head reddish.

== Life history ==
The larvae are a pest on cereal crops and pastures. Adults have been recorded from November to early December.
