= Scitala simulans =

Scientific classification
- Kingdom: Animalia
- Phylum: Arthropoda
- Clade: Pancrustacea
- Class: Insecta
- Order: Coleoptera
- Suborder: Polyphaga
- Infraorder: Scarabaeiformia
- Family: Scarabaeidae
- Genus: Scitala
- Species: S. simulans

Binomial name
- Scitala simulans Britton, 1987

Species of beetle

Scitala simulans is a species of beetle of the family Scarabaeidae. It is found in Australia (New South Wales).

== Description ==
Adults reach a length of about 12 mm (0.47 in). The clypeus and anterior half of the frons are shining black, while the posterior half of the frons is sericeous black. The pronotum and scutellum are black and sericeous or dull, while the elytra are dark reddish brown, and also sericeous or dull. Finally, the legs and antennae are reddish brown.
