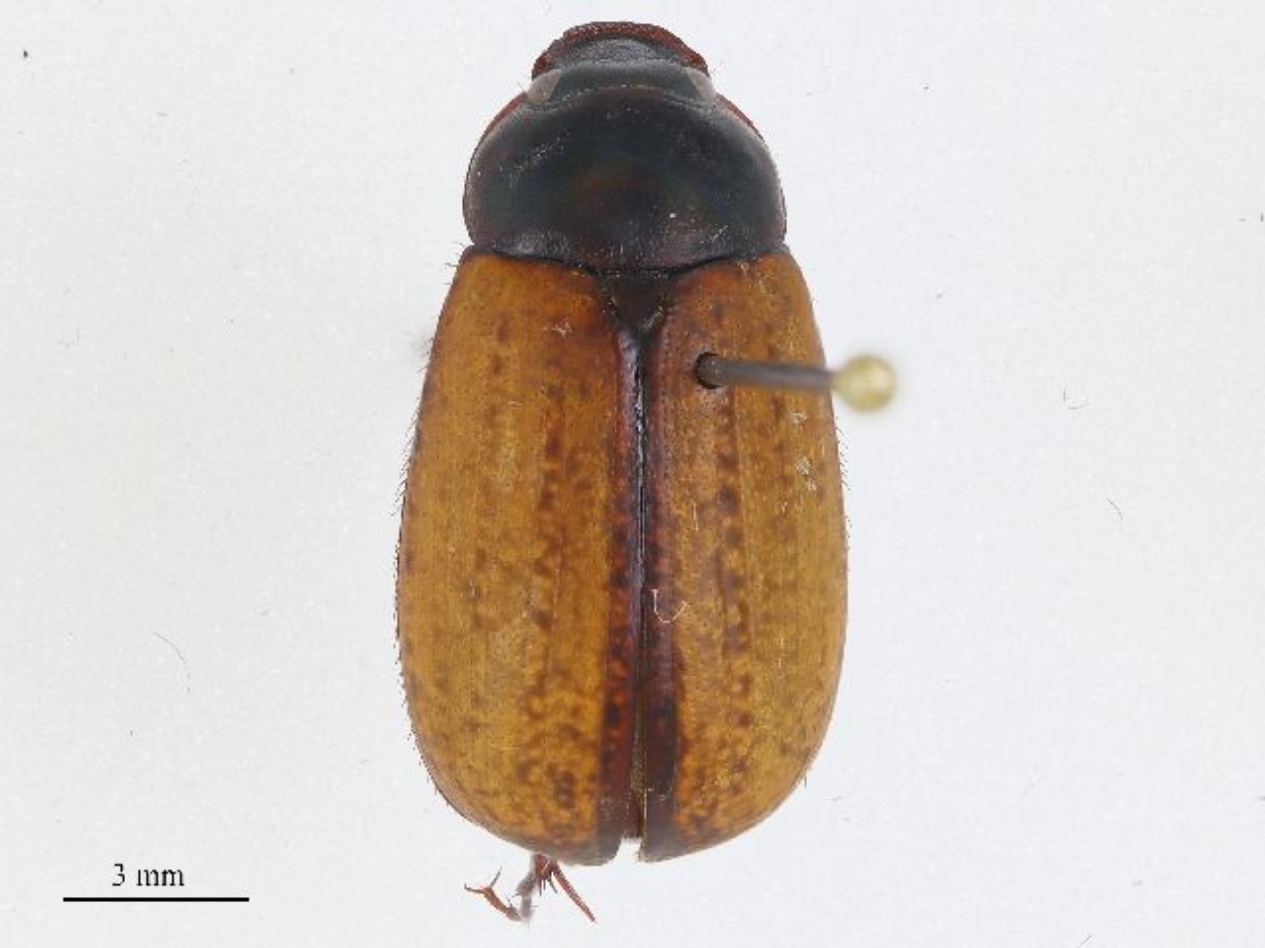

Scientific classification
- Kingdom: Animalia
- Phylum: Arthropoda
- Clade: Pancrustacea
- Class: Insecta
- Order: Coleoptera
- Suborder: Polyphaga
- Infraorder: Scarabaeiformia
- Family: Scarabaeidae
- Genus: Sericesthis
- Species: S. geminata

Binomial name
- Sericesthis geminata Boisduval, 1835

Synonyms
- Melolontha pruinosa Dalman, 1823

= Sericesthis geminata =

Species of beetle

Sericesthis geminata, the pruinose scarab, is a species of beetle of the family Scarabaeidae. It is found in Australia (New South Wales, Queensland, South Australia, Victoria).

== Description ==
Adults reach a length of about 13–17 mm (0.51–0.67 in). The clypeus is reddish brown, while the frons, disc of the pronotum and scutellum are dark brown. The margins of the pronotum are reddish brown and the elytra are yellowish brown, with dark brown mottling.

== Life history ==
The larvae are a pest of lawns and vegetables.
