= Sericesthis tetrica =

Scientific classification
- Kingdom: Animalia
- Phylum: Arthropoda
- Clade: Pancrustacea
- Class: Insecta
- Order: Coleoptera
- Suborder: Polyphaga
- Infraorder: Scarabaeiformia
- Family: Scarabaeidae
- Genus: Sericesthis
- Species: S. tetrica

Binomial name
- Sericesthis tetrica (Blackburn, 1907)

Synonyms
- Anodontonyx tetricus Blackburn, 1907

Species of beetle

Sericesthis tetrica is a species of beetle of the family Scarabaeidae. It is found in Australia (New South Wales).

== Description ==
Adults reach a length of about 9 mm (0.35 in). The head, pronotum and ventral surface are black, while the elytra are very dark brown and the legs dark reddish brown (except for the pale reddish brown tarsi). The antennae are pale yellowish brown.
