= Scitala celata =

Scientific classification
- Kingdom: Animalia
- Phylum: Arthropoda
- Clade: Pancrustacea
- Class: Insecta
- Order: Coleoptera
- Suborder: Polyphaga
- Infraorder: Scarabaeiformia
- Family: Scarabaeidae
- Genus: Scitala
- Species: S. celata

Binomial name
- Scitala celata Britton, 1987

Species of beetle

Scitala celata is a species of beetle of the family Scarabaeidae. It is found in Australia (Western Australia).

== Description ==
Adults reach a length of about 11 mm (0.43 in). The body and legs are bright reddish brown. The disc of the pronotum is punctured and the scutellum is shining and only has punctures at the base. The elytra are shining and sparsely punctured.
