= Schizognathina =

Scientific classification
- Kingdom: Animalia
- Phylum: Arthropoda
- Class: Insecta
- Order: Coleoptera
- Suborder: Polyphaga
- Infraorder: Scarabaeiformia
- Family: Scarabaeidae
- Tribe: Anoplognathini
- Subtribe: Schizognathina; Ohaus, 1918

Subtribe of beetles

Schizognathina, Ohaus, 1918, is a subtribe of scarab beetles, belonging to the tribe Anoplognathini.

== Genera ==
- Amblochilus Blanchard, 1851
- Amblyterus MacLeay, 1819
- Bilobatus Machatschke, 1970
- Clilopocha Lea, 1914
- Dungoorus Carne, 1958
- Eosaulostomus Carne, 1956
- Exochogenys Carne, 1958
- Mesystoechus Waterhouse, 1878
- Mimadoretus Arrow, 1901, syn. Popillia MacLeay, 1887
- Pseudoschizognathus Ohaus, 1904
- Saulostomus Waterhouse, 1878
- Schizognathus Fischer Von Waldheim, 1823
- Trioplognathus Ohaus, 1904
- Phalangogonia Burmeister, 1844
