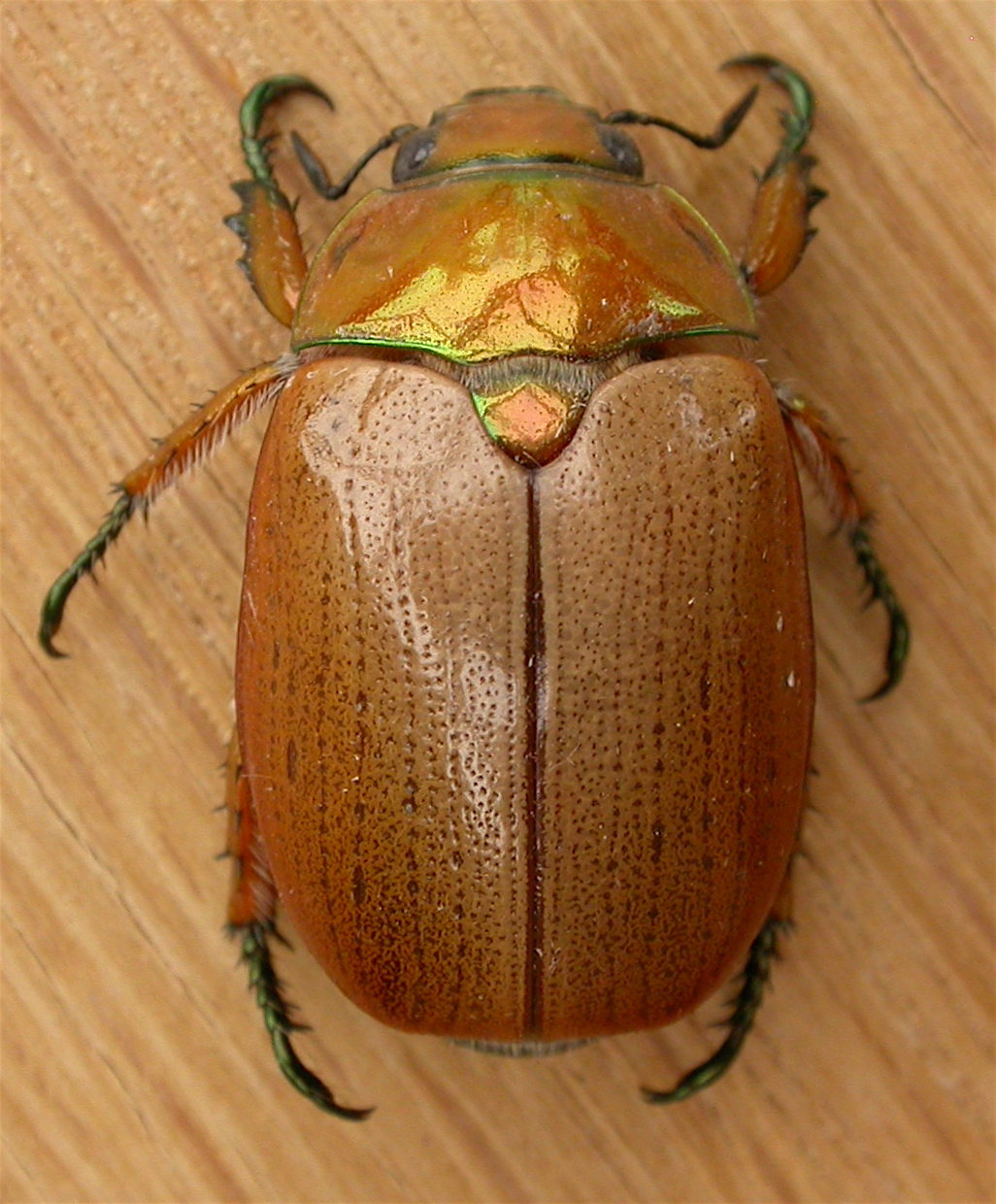
- Anoplognathus chloropyrus

Scientific classification
- Kingdom: Animalia
- Phylum: Arthropoda
- Clade: Pancrustacea
- Class: Insecta
- Order: Coleoptera
- Suborder: Polyphaga
- Infraorder: Scarabaeiformia
- Family: Scarabaeidae
- Subfamily: Rutelinae
- Tribe: Anoplognathini; MacLeay, 1819

Synonyms
- Anoplognathides Lacordaire, 1855; Anoplognathitae Blanchard, 1851; Anoplognathites Latreille, 1829; Anoplognathidae MacLeay, 1819; Brachysternides Lacordaire, 1855; Platycoeliidae Ohaus, 1904

= Anoplognathini =

Tribe of beetles

Anoplognathini is a tribe of scarab beetles belonging to the subfamily Rutelinae, a group endemic to the Neotropical and Australian biogeographic realms.

== Subtribes ==
- Anoplognathina MacLeay, 1819
  - Anoplognathus Leach, 1815 (38 spp.)
  - Anoplostethus Brullé, 1837 (3 spp.)
  - Calloodes White, 1845 (4 spp.)
  - Epichrysus White, 1841 (1 spp.)
  - Paraschizognathus Ohaus, 1904 (13 spp.)
  - Repsimus MacLeay, 1819 (2 spp.)
  - Wambo Allsopp, 1988 (1 spp.)
- Brachysternina Burmeister, 1844
  - Aulacopalpus Guérin-Méneville, 1838 (9 spp.)
  - Brachysternus Guérin-Méneville, 1831 (7 spp.)
  - Hylamorpha Arrow, 1899 (1 spp.)
- Phalangogoniina Ohaus, 1918
  - Phalangogonia Burmeister, 1844 (11 spp.)
- Platycoeliina Burmeister, 1844
  - Platycoelia Dejean, 1833 (63 spp.)
- Schizognathina Ohaus, 1918
  - Amblochilus Blanchard, 1851 (1 spp.)
  - Amblyterus MacLeay, 1819 (9 spp.)
  - Bilobatus Machatschke, 1970 (2 spp.)
  - Clilopocha Lea, 1914 (5 spp.)
  - Dungoorus Carne, 1958 (2 spp.)
  - Eosaulostomus Carne, 1956 (6 spp.)
  - Exochogenys Carne, 1958 (1 spp.)
  - Mesystoechus Waterhouse, 1878 (3 spp.)
  - Mimadoretus Arrow, 1901 (3 spp.)
  - Pseudoschizognathus Ohaus, 1904 (3 spp.)
  - Saulostomus Waterhouse, 1878 (5 spp.)
  - Schizognathus Fischer Von Waldheim, 1823 (8 spp.)
  - Trioplognathus Ohaus, 1904 (1 spp.)
