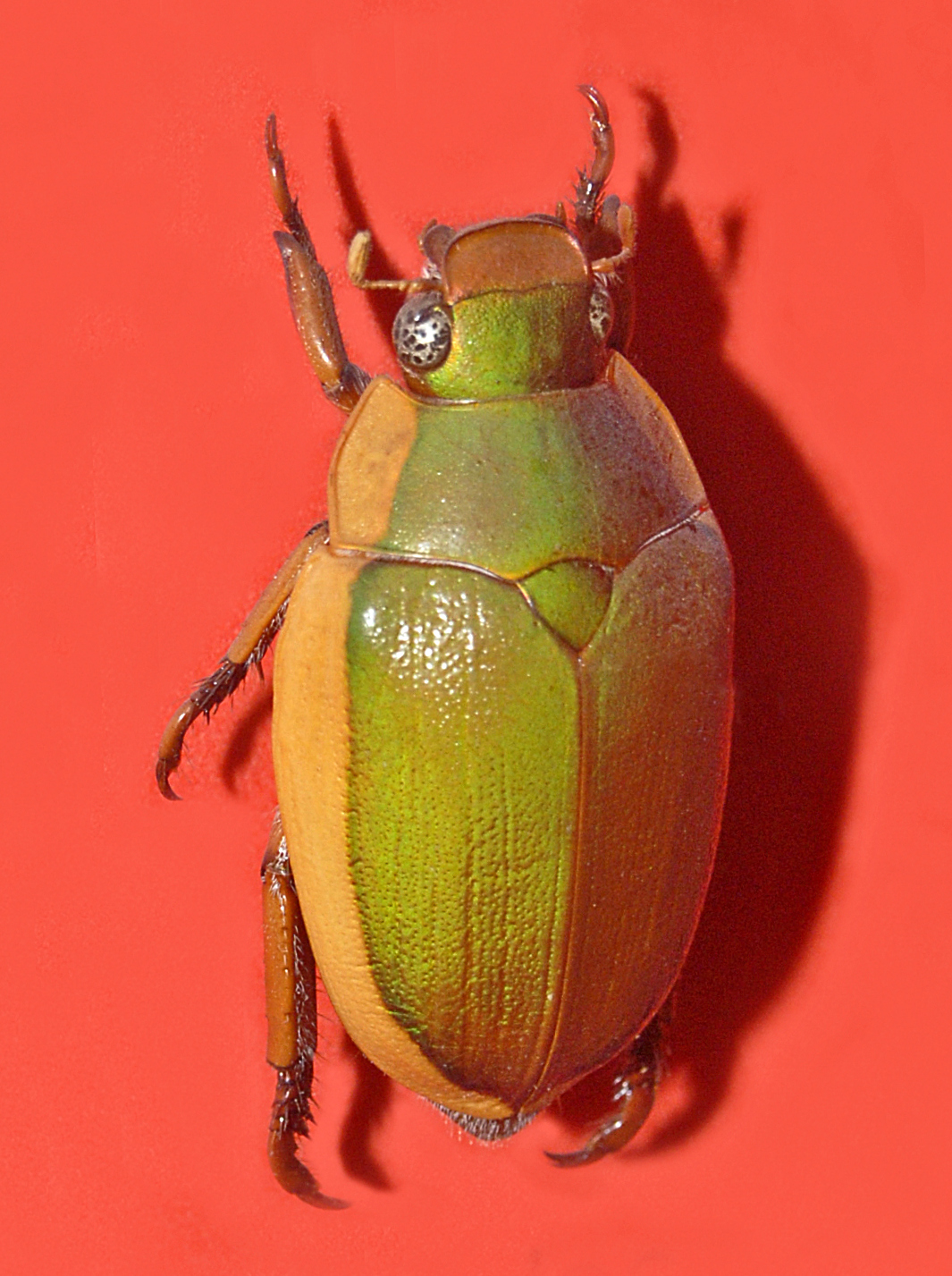
- Museum specimen of Calloodes grayianus

Scientific classification
- Kingdom: Animalia
- Phylum: Arthropoda
- Clade: Pancrustacea
- Class: Insecta
- Order: Coleoptera
- Suborder: Polyphaga
- Infraorder: Scarabaeiformia
- Family: Scarabaeidae
- Genus: Calloodes
- Species: C. grayianus

Binomial name
- Calloodes grayianus White, 1845

= Calloodes grayianus =

Species of beetle

Calloodes grayianus, the golden bordered beetle, is a species of shining leaf chafers of the family Scarabaeidae.

== Description ==
Calloodes grayianus can reach a body length of about 30 millimetres (1.2 in). It is the largest species of the genus Calloodes and it is a structurally coloured species creating a green body appearance, with yellow margins. It shows complex eyes and a horny protrusion in the front head.

== Distribution ==
This species can be found in the rainforest of Australia.

== Etymology ==
The name honours John Edward Gray.
