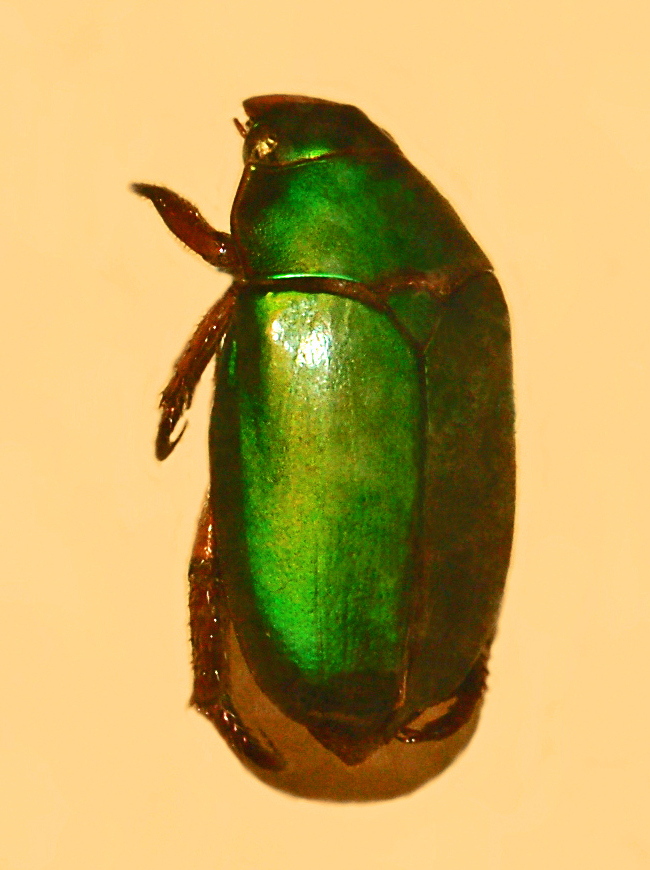
- Museum specimen of Calloodes rayneri

Scientific classification
- Kingdom: Animalia
- Phylum: Arthropoda
- Clade: Pancrustacea
- Class: Insecta
- Order: Coleoptera
- Suborder: Polyphaga
- Infraorder: Scarabaeiformia
- Family: Scarabaeidae
- Genus: Calloodes
- Species: C. rayneri

Binomial name
- Calloodes rayneri MacLeay, 1864

= Calloodes rayneri =

Species of beetle

Calloodes rayneri, the green scarab beetle or Christmas beetle, is a species of shining leaf chafers of the family Scarabaeidae.

== Description ==
Calloodes rayneri has bright metallic-green body and reddish legs. It is quite common in northern Australia at Christmas time (hence the common name). Larvae probably live in sandy habitats.

== Distribution ==
This species can be found in coastal area of Queensland (Australia).
