= Clilopocha pilosicollis =

Scientific classification
- Kingdom: Animalia
- Phylum: Arthropoda
- Clade: Pancrustacea
- Class: Insecta
- Order: Coleoptera
- Suborder: Polyphaga
- Infraorder: Scarabaeiformia
- Family: Scarabaeidae
- Genus: Clilopocha
- Species: C. pilosicollis

Binomial name
- Clilopocha pilosicollis (Lea, 1917)

Synonyms
- Aneurystypus pilosicollis Lea, 1917

Species of beetle

Clilopocha pilosicollis is a species of beetle of the family Scarabaeidae. It is found in Australia (South Australia).

== Description ==
Adults reach a length of about 9–10 mm (0.35–0.39 in). They are reddish-brown to reddish-black, with the antennae lighter in colour. The disc of the frons and pronotum are setose, while the clypeus is impunctate and shining.
