= Mesystoechus ciliatus =

Scientific classification
- Kingdom: Animalia
- Phylum: Arthropoda
- Clade: Pancrustacea
- Class: Insecta
- Order: Coleoptera
- Suborder: Polyphaga
- Infraorder: Scarabaeiformia
- Family: Scarabaeidae
- Genus: Mesystoechus
- Species: M. ciliatus

Binomial name
- Mesystoechus ciliatus Waterhouse, 1878

Species of beetle

Mesystoechus ciliatus is a species of beetle of the family Scarabaeidae. It is found in Australia (Queensland, New South Wales).

== Description ==
Adults reach a length of about 9–11 mm (0.35–0.43 in). The dorsum is yellowish brown and the scutellum is dark brownish black. The pronotum has a pattern of dark yellowish black. The pygidium and legs are dark brown.

== Life history ==
Adult males are diurnal. They have been recorded from late October to mid-December. Females probably remain in the soil.
