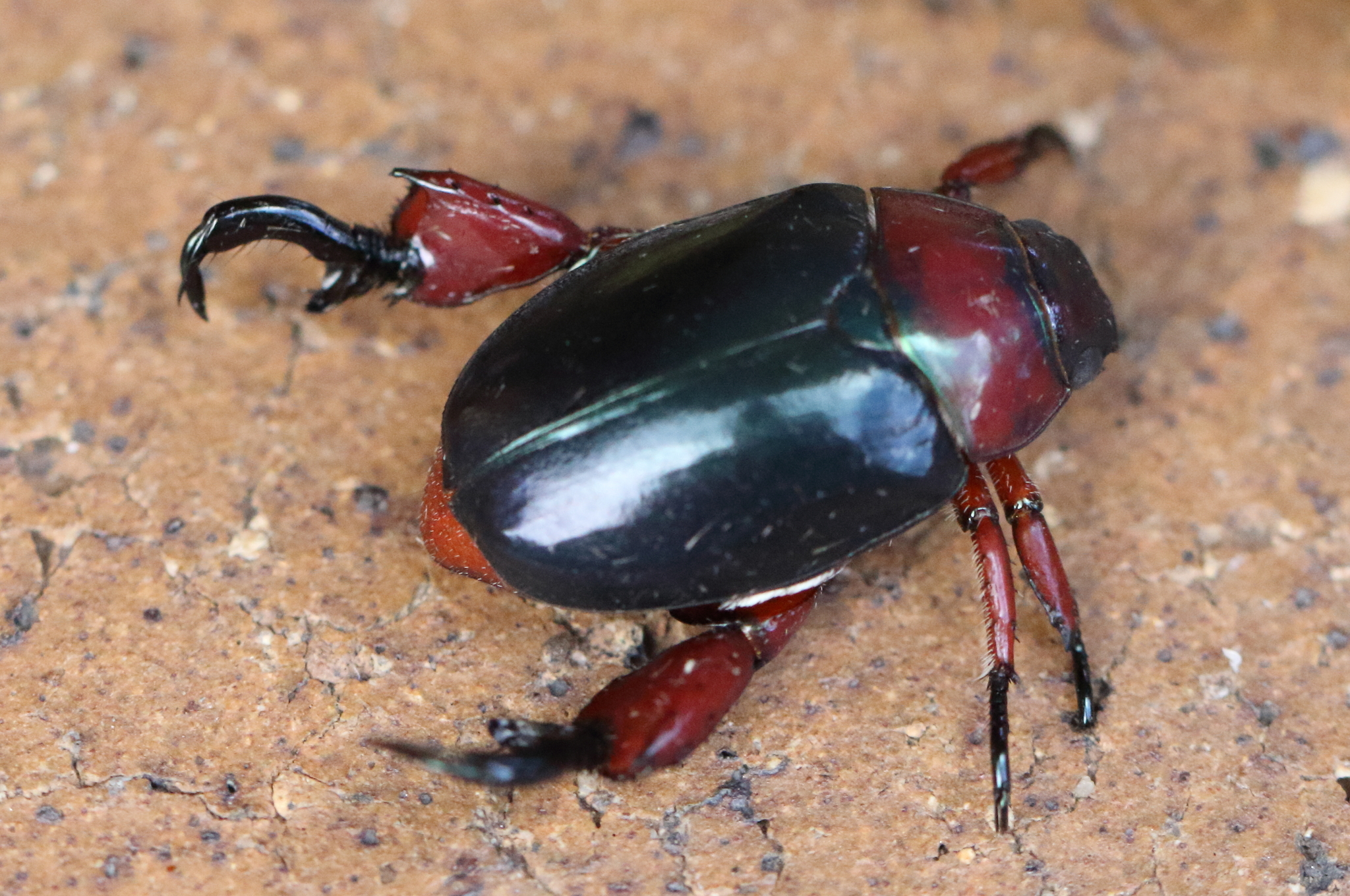
- Repsimus manicatus

Scientific classification
- Kingdom: Animalia
- Phylum: Arthropoda
- Clade: Pancrustacea
- Class: Insecta
- Order: Coleoptera
- Suborder: Polyphaga
- Infraorder: Scarabaeiformia
- Family: Scarabaeidae
- Subfamily: Rutelinae
- Tribe: Anoplognathini
- Genus: Repsimus; MacLeay, 1819

= Repsimus =

Genus of leaf beetles

Repsimus is a genus of beetles belonging to the family Scarabaeidae.

== Species ==
- Repsimus aeneus (Fabricius, 1775)
- Repsimus manicatus (Swartz, 1817)
