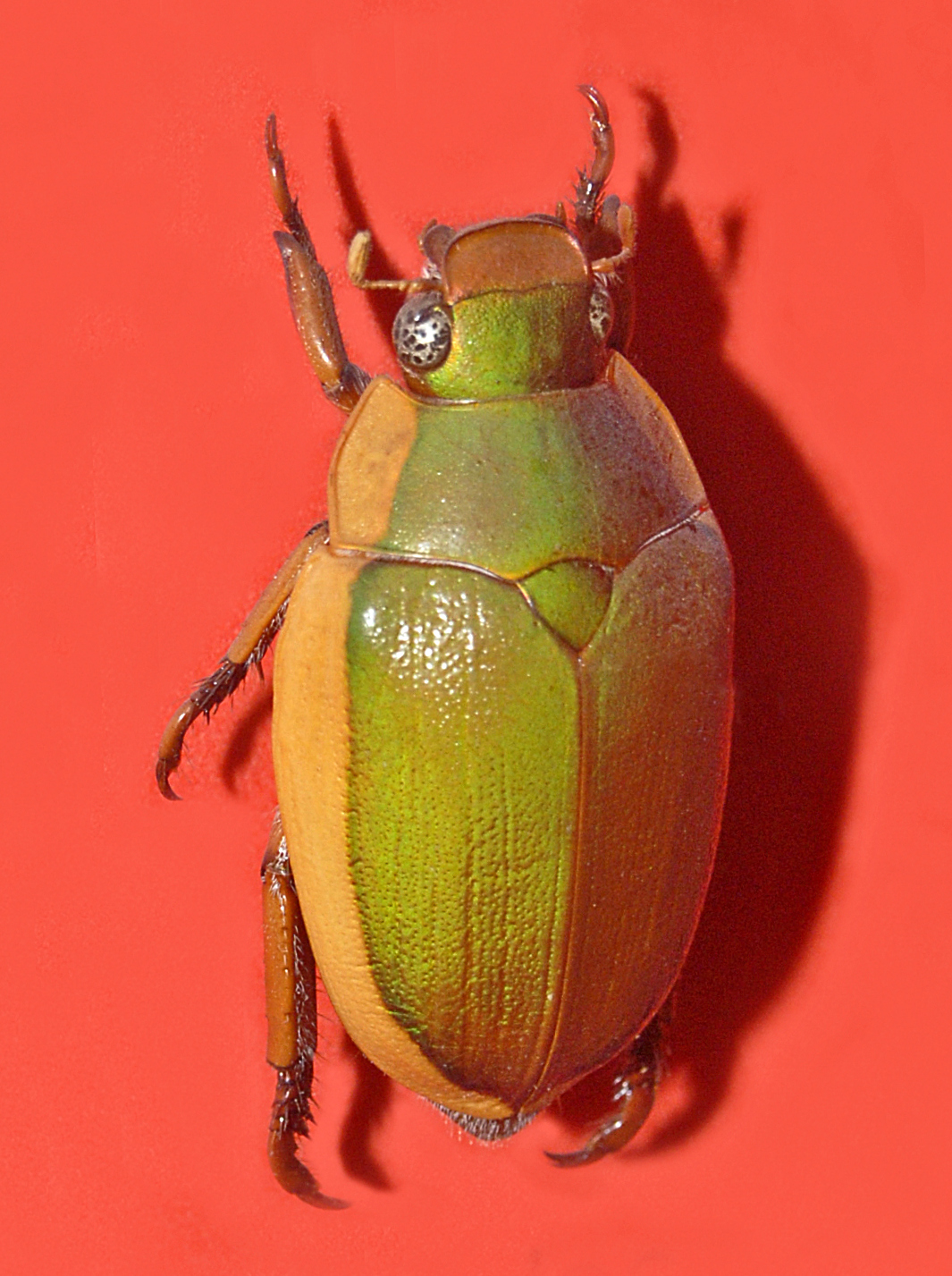
- Museum specimen of Calloodes grayianus

Scientific classification
- Kingdom: Animalia
- Phylum: Arthropoda
- Clade: Pancrustacea
- Class: Insecta
- Order: Coleoptera
- Suborder: Polyphaga
- Infraorder: Scarabaeiformia
- Family: Scarabaeidae
- Subfamily: Rutelinae
- Tribe: Anoplognathini
- Subtribe: Anoplognathina
- Genus: Calloodes; White, 1845

= Calloodes =

Genus of beetles

Calloodes is a genus of shining leaf chafers (scarab beetles belonging to the Rutelinae subfamily).

== Species ==
- Calloodes atkinsoni Waterhouse, 1868
- Calloodes frenchi Ohaus, 1912
- Calloodes grayianus White, 1845
- Calloodes rayneri Macleay, 1864
