= Bilobatus testaceipennis =

Scientific classification
- Kingdom: Animalia
- Phylum: Arthropoda
- Clade: Pancrustacea
- Class: Insecta
- Order: Coleoptera
- Suborder: Polyphaga
- Infraorder: Scarabaeiformia
- Family: Scarabaeidae
- Genus: Bilobatus
- Species: B. testaceipennis

Binomial name
- Bilobatus testaceipennis (Ohaus, 1901)

Synonyms
- Homotropus testaceipennis Ohaus, 1901

Species of beetle

Bilobatus testaceipennis is a species of beetle of the family Scarabaeidae. It is found in Australia (Victoria).

== Description ==
Adults reach a length of about 13–14 mm (0.51–0.55 in). The head, pronotum, scutellum, and pygidium are dark brownish black with a green tinge, while the elytra are brownish yellow with darkened to brown intervals.
