= Aulacopalpus =

Scientific classification
- Kingdom: Animalia
- Phylum: Arthropoda
- Clade: Pancrustacea
- Class: Insecta
- Order: Coleoptera
- Suborder: Polyphaga
- Infraorder: Scarabaeiformia
- Family: Scarabaeidae
- Subfamily: Rutelinae
- Tribe: Anoplognathini
- Genus: Aulacopalpus; Guérin-Méneville, 1838

Synonyms
- Aulacopalpus (Mimotribosthes) Gutiérrez Alonso, 1949; Aegolasia Kolbe, 1907; Amblyterodes Germain, 1905; Pseudadelphus Arrow, 1899; Sulcipalpus Harold, 1869; Bembegeneius Solier, 1851; Tribostethes Curtis, 1844

Genus of leaf beetles

Aulacopalpus is a genus of beetles belonging to the family Scarabaeidae.

== Species ==
- Aulacopalpus aconcaguensis Smith, 2002
- Aulacopalpus castaneus (Laporte, 1840)
- Aulacopalpus ciliatus (Solier, 1851)
- Aulacopalpus clypealis Ohaus, 1905
- Aulacopalpus pilicollis (Fairmaire, 1883)
- Aulacopalpus punctatus (Fairmaire & Germain, 1860)
- Aulacopalpus pygidialis Ohaus, 1905
- Aulacopalpus valdiviensis Smith, 2002
- Aulacopalpus viridis Guérin-Méneville, 1838
