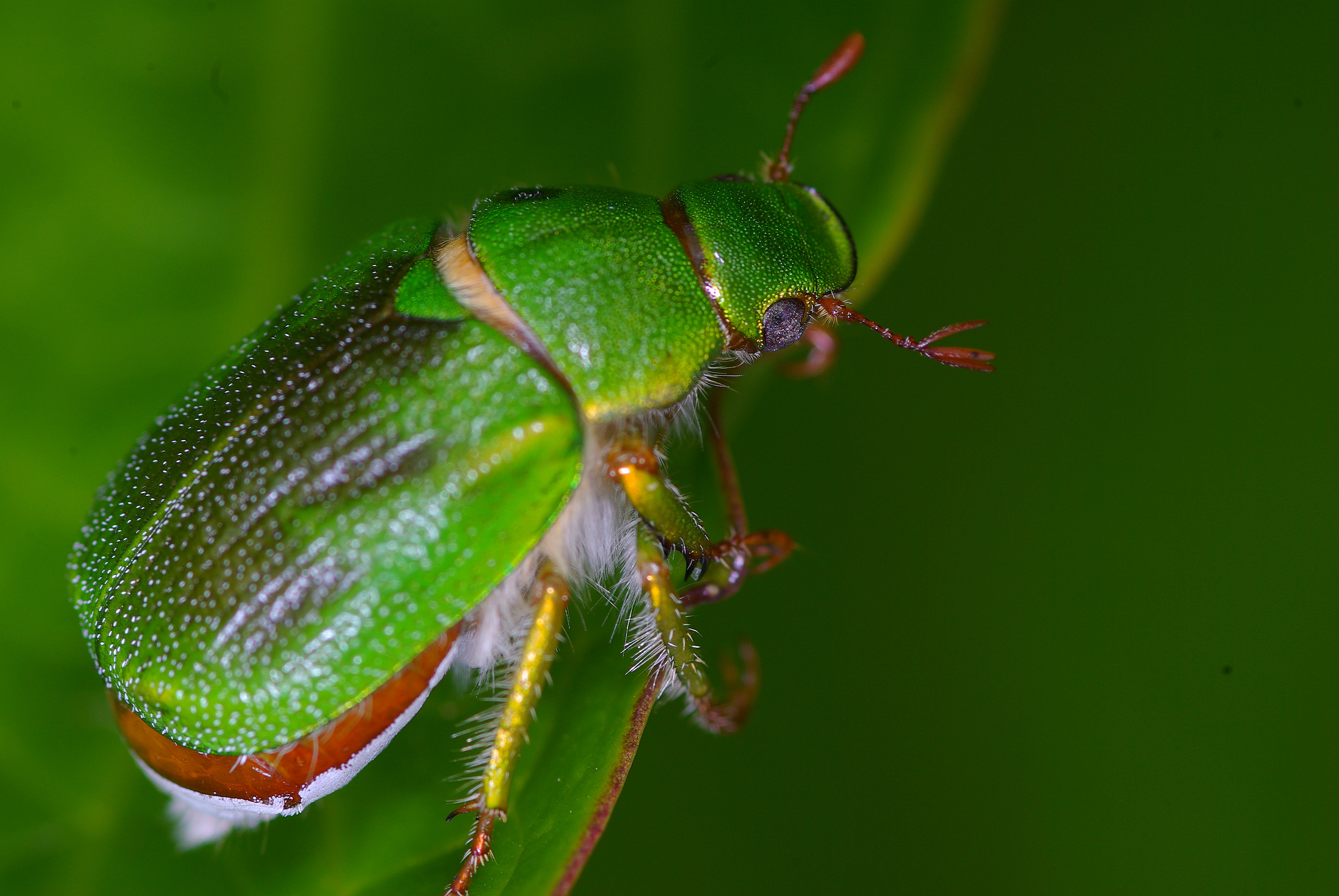

Scientific classification
- Kingdom: Animalia
- Phylum: Arthropoda
- Clade: Pancrustacea
- Class: Insecta
- Order: Coleoptera
- Suborder: Polyphaga
- Infraorder: Scarabaeiformia
- Family: Scarabaeidae
- Genus: Brachysternus
- Species: B. prasinus

Binomial name
- Brachysternus prasinus Guérin-Méneville, 1830

Synonyms
- List: Brachysternus dilatatus Germain, 1905; Brachysternus fulvipes Guérin-Méneville, 1838; Brachysternus hirtus Ohaus, 1905; Brachysternus prasinus subsp. viridipes Ohaus, 1905; Brachysternus pubescens Germain, 1905; Brachysternus sinuatifrons Germain, 1905; Brachysternus vicinus Guérin-Méneville, 1840; Brachysternus viridis Germain, 1905

= Brachysternus prasinus =

Species of beetle

Brachysternus prasinus is a species of scarab beetle endemic to Chile and parts of Argentina. It was named after French entomologist Félix Édouard Guérin-Méneville and belongs to the Rutelinae subfamily of the Scarabaeidae family. It is the most common species in the Brachysternus genus and the most varied in terms of color and type of setae. Due to this variability, B. prasinus have often been used in entomological studies as the species with which to compare all other Brachysternus species. It ranges from 11 to 19 mm in length. Its body is green and its light brown legs have white hairs.

== Description ==
B. prasinus is often mistaken for the more well-known Hylamorpha elegans, also known as the San Juan beetle, as they are both found in the same habitat. It can be differentiated from other Brachysternus beetle species because they have a well-developed supraspiracular ridge on the abdomen of male B. prasinus, as well as a deeply emarginate terminal sclerite on the legs of female B. prasinus. Other identifiers of B. prasinus include their clypeal apex (a part of the insect's head) that is weakly reflexed at its tip. B. prasinus have prothoracic legs. These prothoracic legs include femurs which are weakly rounded and dilated, as well as tibia with weak pro tibial notches.

Male and female B. prasinus differ slightly in their body shape. Male B. prasinus have the apex of the terminal sternite quadrate (a part of an insect's thorax or abdomen), while females are categorized as having the apex of the terminal sternite moderately to deeply emarginate. In other words, the bottoms of female B. prasinus are slightly more rounded than those of their male counterparts.

=== Morphs ===
There is a large amount of variation among Brachysternus and especially in B. prasinus. Due to this large amount of variation, there are several different morphotypes of B. prasinus. There have been many different proposed names for these varied morphotypes. One morphotype is endemic to the province of Talca, which encompasses Carrizalillo and Constitución, in central Chile. This morphotype is unique because of its more dense setose, found dorsally on their upper body. While these setae on B. prasinus are typically orange in the central Chilean morphotype, the setose of B. prasinus are a darker metallic green color on the top of their body and a deeper chestnut color on the bottom part of their body. This difference is thought to be due to changes in genetics across different locations. However, it has been argued that many of these morphotypes do not differ significantly and therefore should not be categorized separately. Some argue that these differences in color and setae type are due to B. prasinus having a vast range of normal phenotypes.

== Distribution and habitat ==
Brachysternus prasinus lives on the southwestern coast of South America, in Chile and parts of Argentina. The habitat of B. prasinus spans from the Valparaíso region to the Magallanes Province in Chile. B. prasinus is found in Argentina in the province of Neuquén and the Río Grande Department region which is a part of the Tierra del Fuego Province. B. prasinus is seen across a wide range of elevations. It is found anywhere from elevations at sea level to 2,000 meters above it. Their geographic range is highly dependent on the availability and distribution of Nothofagus, the species which B. prasinus feeds on. B. prasinus have been observed in the Nothofagus forests near the cities of Coquimbo and Llanquihue in Chile as well as the areas of Neuquén and Chubut in western Argentina.

== Diet ==
Brachysternus prasinus lives in Nothofagus forests. It is hypothesized that the larvae of B. prasinus feed on dead and decaying wood as well as other vegetation similar to other Ruteline larvae. Adult B. prasinus often fly at dusk to other nearby Nothofagus trees for sustenance. These Nothofagus forests consist mainly of the Nothofagus plant but also often include other plant species like Araucaria (Araucariaceae), Saxegothaea (Pinaceae), Drimys (Winteraceae), and Chusquea (Poaceae). Most of these plant species are plentiful from the months of November to February. The Valdivian rainforest district has two types of Northofagus including the deciduous Nothofagus obliqua and Nothofagus alpina, which is also called N. nervosa.

== Life history ==
There is not much known about the life cycle and stages of Brachysternus prasinus currently. B. prasinus has a life cycle that includes the following stages: egg, pupa, larvae, and adult. The larvae of B. prasinus have been found alongside other Chilean beetle scarab species including the larvae of Hylamorpha elegans. The larvae have been known to feed on the roots of crops as well as rotting wood. The larvae appear white, with a dark chestnut colored head. The abdomen area of the larvae is also slightly darker. There is not much known about the pupal stage of B. prasinus. These beetles have an annual life cycle like many other scarab beetles. They are thought to be in the larval stage from January to around the month of November. The pupal stage spans sometime between September and November. Finally, the adult stage lasts from approximately the month of November to February.

=== Flight ===
Adult B. prasinus often fly at dusk to nearby Nothofagus trees for sustenance. It has been observed that the peak flight season for Brachysternus prasinus is at the end of December. Adult B. prasinus are attracted to lights at night and have been captured while flying by shining lights in the darkness.

=== Olfaction ===
The species is highly dependent on different olfactory cues in its environment. B. prasinus uses chemoreception, which is the process which allows organisms to respond appropriately to environmental stimuli, especially through smells and tastes. This chemoreception is carried out by odorant receptors (ORs), ionotropic receptors (IRs), and gustatory receptors (GRs). These different receptors relate to key proteins in the chemical ecology of these insects and can provide information on the evolutionary processes of scarab beetle species like B. prasinus. Scientists have used relative levels of ORs, IRs, and GRs to analyze the relations of different Scarabaeidae including B. prasinus. It has been found that there is a sizable difference between male and female B. prasinus in their expression of different ORs, which may provide important information on the behavior and reproductive habits of the species. It has also been suggested that ORs play a role in detecting plant volatiles, a process that is crucial to the feeding habits of insects like B. prasinus.

Olfactory receptor neurons (ORNs) in scarab beetles like Brachysternus prasinus and Hylamorpha elegans are key to detection of different smells as well. ORNs are specifically tuned to recognize enantiomeric pheromones. Additionally, pheromone-degrading enzymes are present in the antenna of scarab beetles. These enzymes show high substrate specificity which is thought to allow these beetles to deactivate certain pheromones and odorants but not others. These pheromones and pheromone-degrading enzymes are key to the chemical communication of scarab beetles, about which not much is currently known.

== Interactions with humans and livestock ==
=== Pest of crop plants ===
Brachysternus prasinus are part of the family Scarabaeidae, which is a highly diverse family but many of these insects have been considered pests by farmers and scientists. B. prasinus is viewed as a subterranean pest. These beetles can cause damage through their laval feeding habits on the roots of crops as well as adult feedings on the above ground portions of plants. As a result, B. prasinus is important in regard to South American agriculture and the Chilean economy. B. prasinus has been known to cause damage to wheat crops, especially Triticum aestivum, as well as red clovers (Trifolium pratense). These pests have been difficult for farmers and agriculturalists to control because it is hard to determine larval positions in the soil and to predict their activity at night. Several different possible solutions have been proposed to diminish the effects of these beetle pests on crop outputs including chemical and biological controls. Chemical control entails using specific chemicals as pest repellent. Biological control entails the manipulation of different pathogens and sex pheromones of scarabs.
