= Clilopocha mandibularis =

Scientific classification
- Kingdom: Animalia
- Phylum: Arthropoda
- Clade: Pancrustacea
- Class: Insecta
- Order: Coleoptera
- Suborder: Polyphaga
- Infraorder: Scarabaeiformia
- Family: Scarabaeidae
- Genus: Clilopocha
- Species: C. mandibularis

Binomial name
- Clilopocha mandibularis (Carne, 1954)

Synonyms
- Dynastomorphus mandibularis Carne, 1954

Species of beetle

Clilopocha mandibularis is a species of beetle of the family Scarabaeidae. It is found in Australia (South Australia).

== Description ==
Adults reach a length of about 9 mm (0.35 in). They are reddish-brown, with the pronotum impunctate on the narrow posteromedian area. The punctures are irregular and transverse and the elytra have very narrow membranous margins.
