= Clilopocha whiteae =

Scientific classification
- Kingdom: Animalia
- Phylum: Arthropoda
- Clade: Pancrustacea
- Class: Insecta
- Order: Coleoptera
- Suborder: Polyphaga
- Infraorder: Scarabaeiformia
- Family: Scarabaeidae
- Genus: Clilopocha
- Species: C. whiteae

Binomial name
- Clilopocha whiteae Lea, 1914

Species of beetle

Clilopocha whiteae is a species of beetle of the family Scarabaeidae. It is found in Australia (South Australia).

== Description ==
Adults reach a length of about 8–9.5 mm (0.31–0.37 in). They are reddish-castaneous, with the antennae paler. The head (except for a portion of the clypeus) are more or less blackish. The pronotum and elytra are fringed with rather long stramineous hairs, becoming longer and denser on the undersurface and on parts of the legs. The elytra have moderately long semi-upright hairs scattered about.
