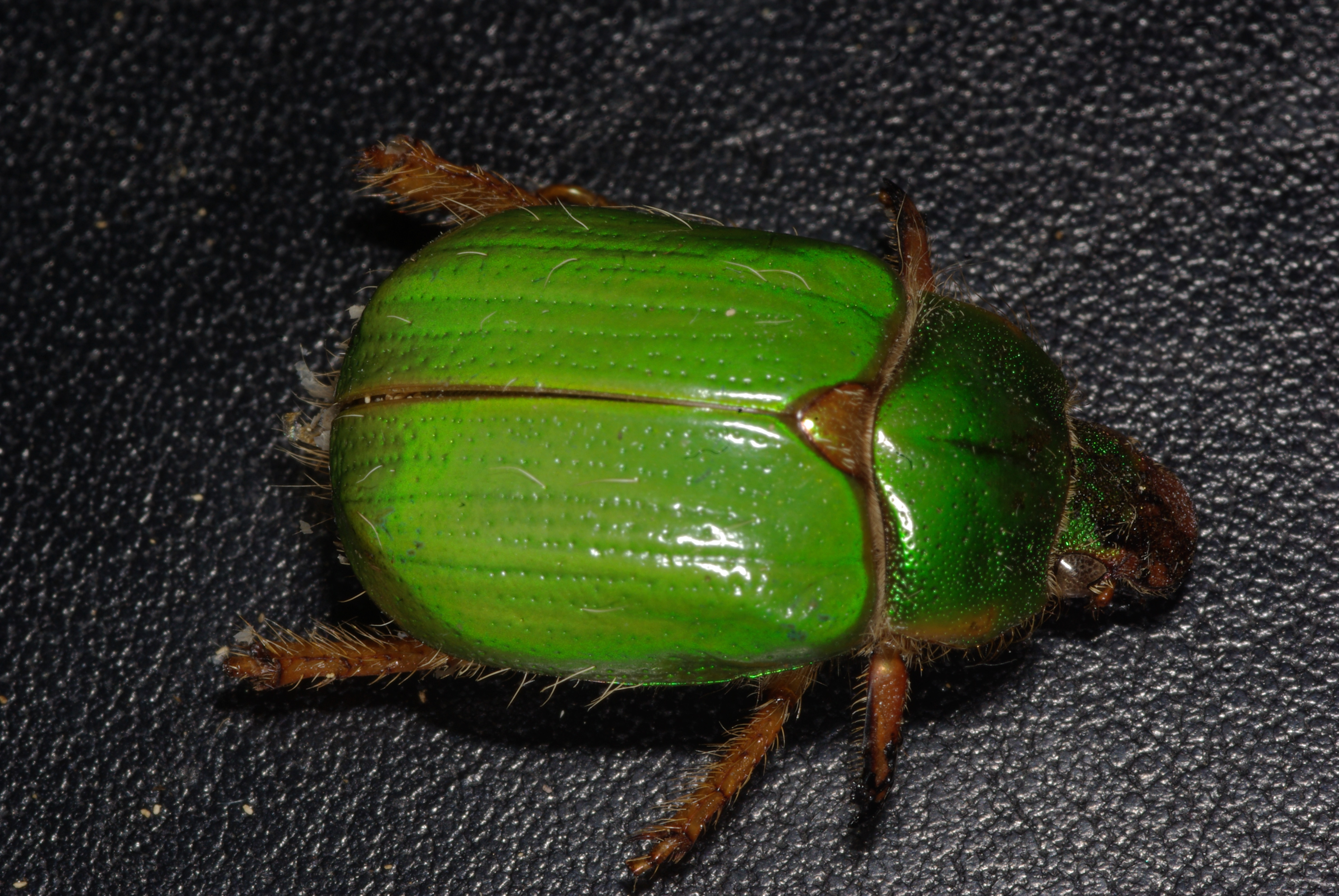

Scientific classification
- Kingdom: Animalia
- Phylum: Arthropoda
- Clade: Pancrustacea
- Class: Insecta
- Order: Coleoptera
- Suborder: Polyphaga
- Infraorder: Scarabaeiformia
- Family: Scarabaeidae
- Subfamily: Rutelinae
- Tribe: Anoplognathini
- Subtribe: Brachysternina
- Genus: Hylamorpha; Arrow, 1899
- Species: H. elegans

Binomial name
- Hylamorpha elegans (Burmeister, 1844)

Synonyms
- Species synonymy: Aulacopalpus australis Philippi, 1861; Aulacopalpus elegans subsp. australis Philippi, 1861; Callichloris perelegans Curtis, 1845; Hylamorpha cylindrica Arrow, 1899; Hylamorpha rufimana Arrow, 1899; Sulcipalpus subviolaceus Nonfried, 1894; Genus synonymy: Aulacopalpus Burmeister, 1844; Callichloris Curtis, 1844; Callichloris Dejean, 1833; Sulcipalpus Machatschke, 1965

= Hylamorpha =

Species of beetle

Hylamorpha elegans is a species of beetle in the family Scarabaeidae. It is the only species in the genus Hylamorpha. This beetle is native to South America, particularly in Chile and Argentina.

This beetle is recognized for its appearance and ecological role within its habitat as a decomposer. Its glossy green exoskeleton, with variations in color across its head, pronotum, and elytra, make it. This species is primarily nocturnal, so is often observed foraging for food at night.

Their mating behavior is influenced by host-plant volatiles, with males being attracted to females emitting specific pheromones while feeding on leaves. Once mating occurs, females lay eggs on preferred host plants, such as red clover.

These beetles are agricultural pests, causing damage to crops by feeding on grass and cereal roots in their larval stage. Additionally, they defoliate trees like Nothofagus species during adulthood, impacting forest ecosystems. Predators such as the black-faced ibis and rainbow trout contribute to controlling their population. Understanding their genetics, including chemoreception mechanisms mediated by odorant-binding proteins and chemoreceptors, provides insights into their behavior and potential management strategies. Their interactions with humans and livestock create problems in agriculture and forestry, driving the exploration of alternative pest management approaches like disrupting mating behavior or enhancing soil organic matter to reduce larval damage.

== Description ==
Hylamorpha elegans has a distinct appearance due to its long body, usually measuring between 11.8 to 18.2 millimetres (0.46 to 0.72 in) long, and 5.8 to 10.8 millimetres (0.23 to 0.43 in) wide across the shoulders. Its head, pronotum, and elytra (wing covers) can range from light to dark green, sometimes with shiny silver or bronze reflections, and rarely orange. Chemicals used in preservation of specimens can turn the elytra blue, red, orange, or purple.

Males' front legs are usually green or light brown. While females' front legs are mostly light brown, their back legs are green like their bodies. Male beetles have all green legs with a shiny appearance, especially on the middle and back legs, while females have green legs with varying degrees of shine. The ends of their protibial teeth are always black.

The beetle's heads are densely covered with small bumps or dots. Its antennae have ten segments, with the final segment longer in males than in females. Their mandibles are triangular and end in a sharp or rounded point. Its back has tiny bumps or dots, and its sides have a small edge. The back legs and the lower body have long white hairs. The front legs have three small teeth at the end, and the back legs have a bump on the outer edge. The bottom part of the legs have small bumps, and the very last part of the body is slightly curved, both in males and females.

== Habitat ==
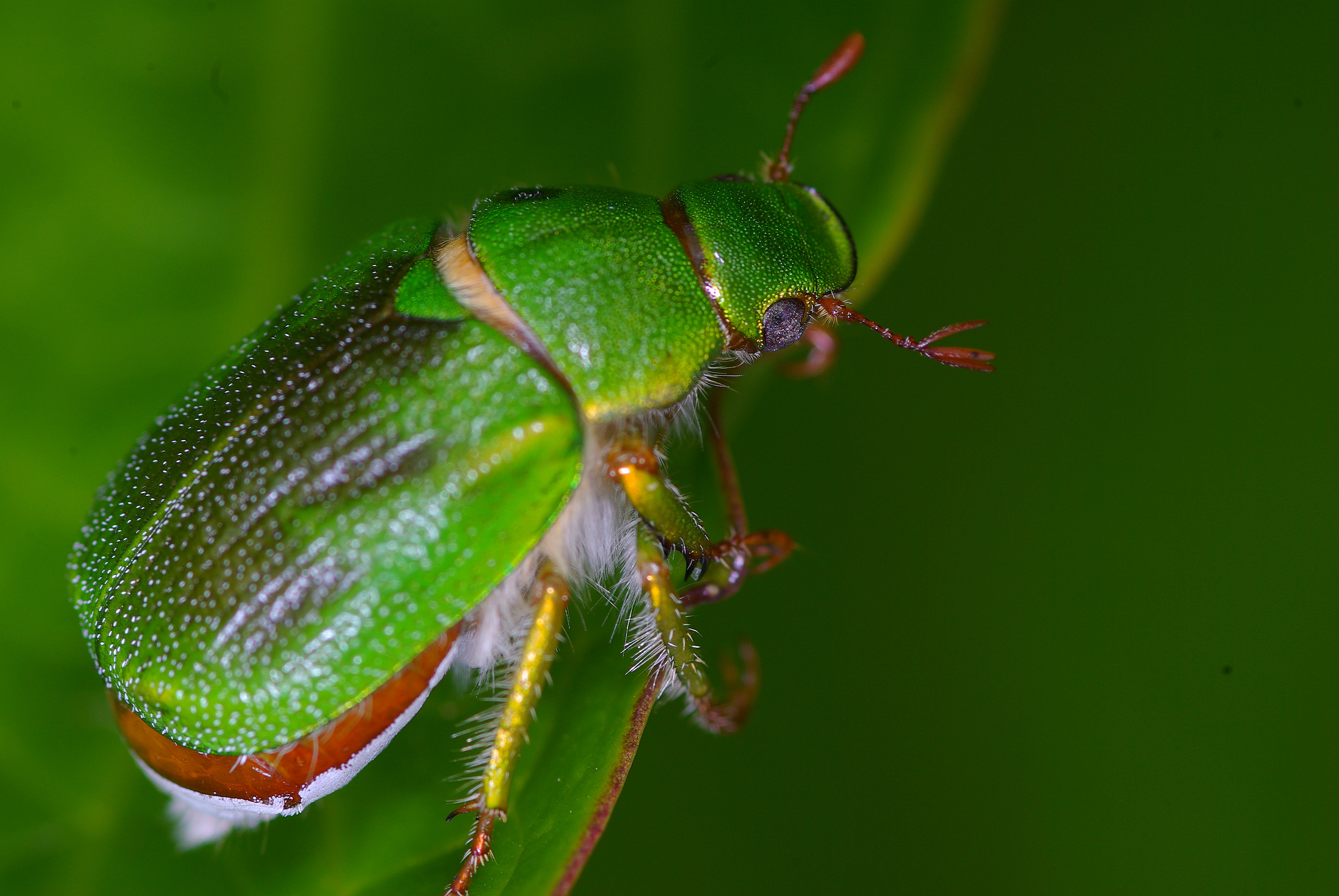
Hylamorpha elegans adult specimen

Similar to other scarab beetles, they likely rely on thermo- and hygrosensitive sensilla to assess their surroundings. Four types of sensilla are present on the antennae of Hylamorpha elegans—sensilla chaetica, which are likely to be mechanoreceptors, sensilla trichoidea, sensilla placodea, and sensilla coeloconica, which may respond to humidity and temperature.

Adults typically emerge from the ground during the spring and summer when evenings are warmer.

== Distribution ==
Hylamorpha elegans beetle inhabits both sides of the Andes in central and southern Chile and southwestern Argentina. Its range corresponds to the distribution of Nothofagus species, which is a food source for adult beetles.

The beetle thrives across central and southern Chile and southwestern Argentina, closely linked to the Andes' landscape

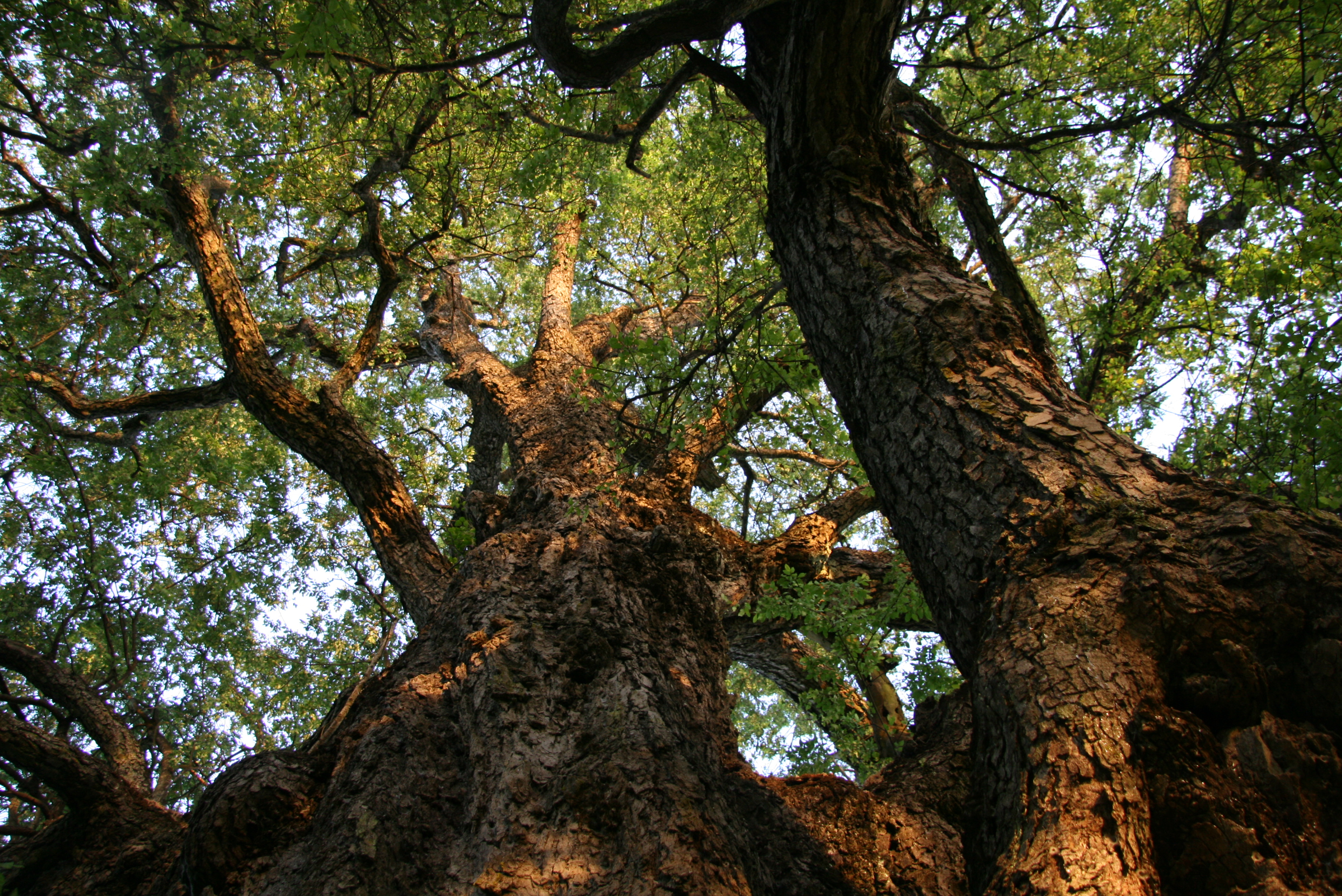
Nothofagus species are food sources for Hylamorpha elegans

== Food resources ==
Hylamorpha elegans exhibits a broad diet encompassing various plant parts, making it a significant agricultural pest. In its larval stage, this beetle primarily feeds on the roots of grasses and small grain cereals, leading to severe agricultural damage in Chile.

Adult beetles feed on Nothofagus species, mainly N. antarctica, N. betuloides, N. dombeyi and N. obliqua. Occasionally they will defoliate host trees, and young trees can be killed by large numbers of beetles feeding on them.

== Life history ==
=== Larvae ===
The larval stage develops in the soil, specifically in the root layer of various plants, including crops. The larvae feed on plant roots, making them significant pests in agricultural settings.

Hylamorpha elegans undergoes a complex life cycle, beginning with the oviposition of eggs by females. These eggs give rise to larvae. The third instars of H. elegans larvae cane be distinguished related species by their coloration, roughness of the cephalic capsule, and the distribution and shape of setae on the raster. H. elegans larvae typically display a slightly rugose, shiny, red surface with a head width averaging 4.2 ± 0.12 mm.

== Enemies ==
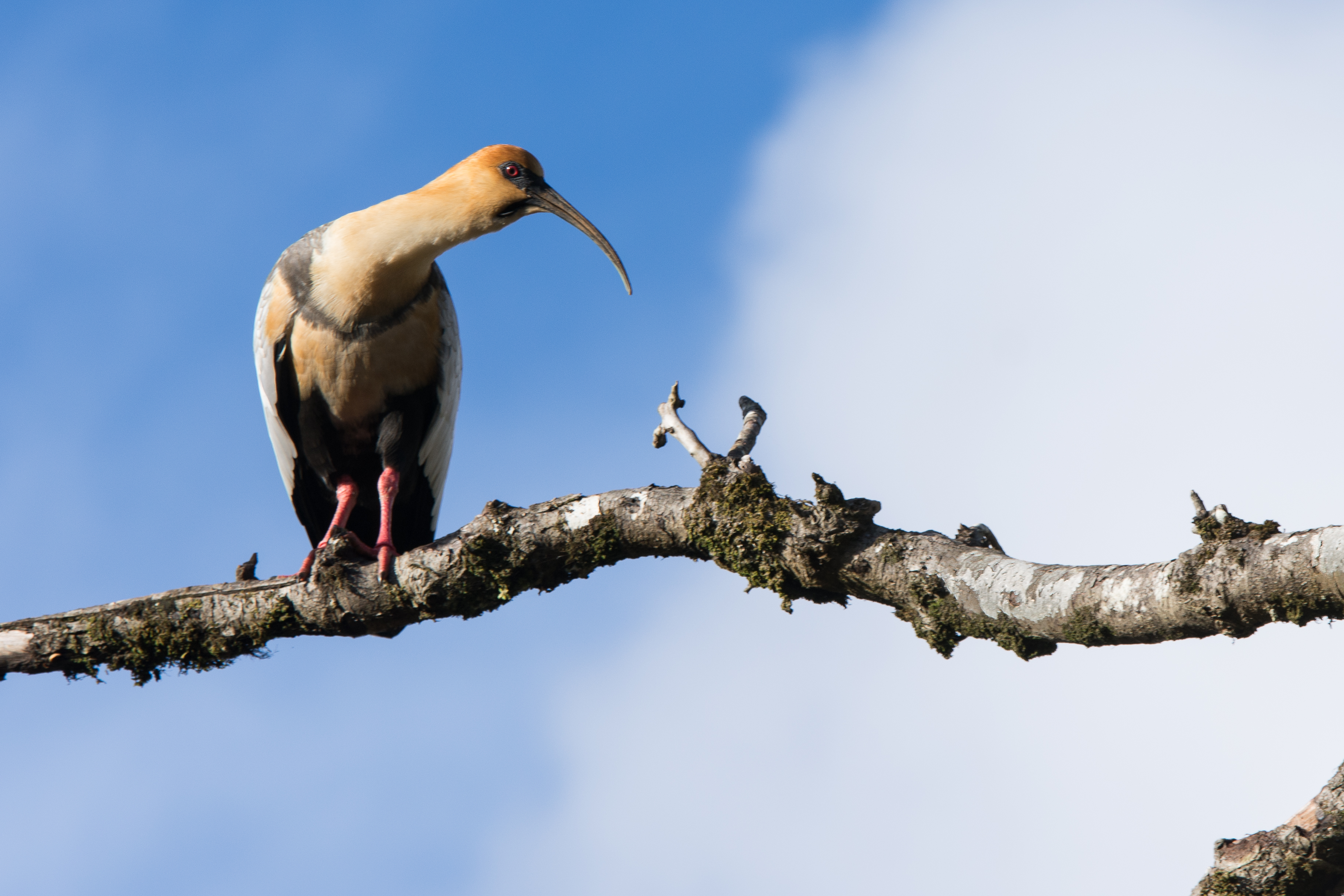
Black-faced ibis, known for its tactile hunting strategy, preys on H. elegans larvae due to their high biomass and energetic content

Black-faced ibises (Theristicus melanopis) feed on the larvae of H. elegans. Black-faced ibises use a tactile strategy, probing the ground for prey with their bills.

Adult beetles which fall into the water are preyed upon by rainbow trout (Oncorhynchus mykiss) at Lago Traful in Argentina.

== Genetics ==
The genetics of H. elegans in the context of chemoreception is crucial for insect behavior such as host-seeking, mate finding, and aggregation. Chemoreception in insects involves specific proteins located in the antennae, particularly in hair-like sensory organs called sensilla. These proteins are responsible for recognizing volatile organic compounds (VOCs) from the environment, and among them, odorant receptors (ORs) play a central role in transducing olfactory information toward the central nervous system of insects.

Recent studies have shed light on the genetic basis of chemoreception in coleopterans, including H. elegans. While ORs have been the primary focus, attention has also been given to gustatory receptors (GRs) and ionotropic receptors (IRs). A transcriptomic analysis of its antennal transcriptome revealed chemoreceptors ORs, GRs, and IRs. This analysis identified a total of 102 OR transcripts, 22 GR transcripts, and 14 IR transcripts for the species. The identification of these transcripts provides valuable insights into the genetic mechanisms underlying chemoreception in H. elegans.

Phylogenetic analysis delineated five main clades corresponding to different sensory functions, including bitter, sugar, and carbon dioxide (CO_{2}) reception. Transcript abundance analysis revealed HeleGR21a as the most abundant GR transcript, followed by HeleGR7, indicating their potential importance in chemosensory signaling.

Ionotropic receptors (IRs) play crucial roles in mediating olfactory and gustatory responses in insects. Transcriptomic analysis of H. elegans antennae identified 14 HeleIRs and 3 BpraIRs. These transcripts exhibited 3-4 transmembrane domains (TMDs) and were distributed across different clades associated with various sensory functions, including olfaction, hygrosensation, and thermosensation. Transcript abundance analysis revealed HeleIR8a, HeleIR25a, and HeleIR76b as the most abundant IR transcripts in H. elegans, highlighting their potential significance in chemosensory signaling pathways.

Odorant receptors (ORs) are critical for detecting volatile compounds in the environment and are essential for various behaviors, including host-seeking and mating. Transcriptomic analysis revealed 65 OR transcripts plus Orco in H. elegans.

The presence of a larger number of GRs in H. elegans suggests a potential role in mediating feeding behaviors and host selection, consistent with the generalist feeding behavior observed in H. elegans. Furthermore, the identification of specific GRs associated with carbon dioxide detection implies their involvement in environmental sensing and possibly mate location.

The differential expression of ORs between male and female H. elegans suggests a potential role in sex-specific behaviors and reproductive strategies. Sex-biased expression analysis of selected ORs revealed differential expression patterns between male and female antennae, suggesting potential roles in mediating sex-specific behaviors or responses to environmental cues. HeleOR14, HeleOR64, and HeleOrco were significantly upregulated in female antennae, while HeleOR46 showed significant upregulation in male antennae. Similarly, BpraOR1 exhibited significant upregulation in female antennae, indicating potential differences in chemosensory responses between sexes. These findings provide valuable insights into the genetic basis of sex-specific behaviors and chemical communication in H. elegans and contribute to our understanding of the molecular mechanisms underlying insect chemoreception.

== Mating ==
Mating behavior is linked to chemical communication by pheromones and sensory structures on their antennae. Virgin females release 1,4-hydroquinone and 1,4-benzoquinone which attract response from males. Olfaction plays a crucial role in scarab beetle mating behavior, aiding in the location of potential mates, food, and oviposition sites.

Hylamorpha elegans exhibit dimorphism in flight behavior. Light trap data indicates that males are primarily involved in dispersal flights, as they are predominantly captured in traps. This suggests that males engage in active flight to search for mates. Females, on the other hand, are less frequently caught in light traps, indicating a more sedentary behavior that is likely associated with feeding on host leaves during the mating period.

Males have significantly more sensilla involved in chemoreception than do females. The ability of male beetles to these females is enhanced by volatile compound produced by N. obliqua which are released when the plants are damaged. These compounds appear to function as sexual kairomones for H. elegans.

After copulation, females of H. elegans fly to specific crops, such as red clover (Trifolium pratense), to deposit their fertilized eggs. The seasonal flight period typically occurs from 11 November to 27 January. This oviposition behavior indicates a deliberate selection of oviposition sites, likely driven by volatile compounds emitted by preferred host plants.

== Physiology ==
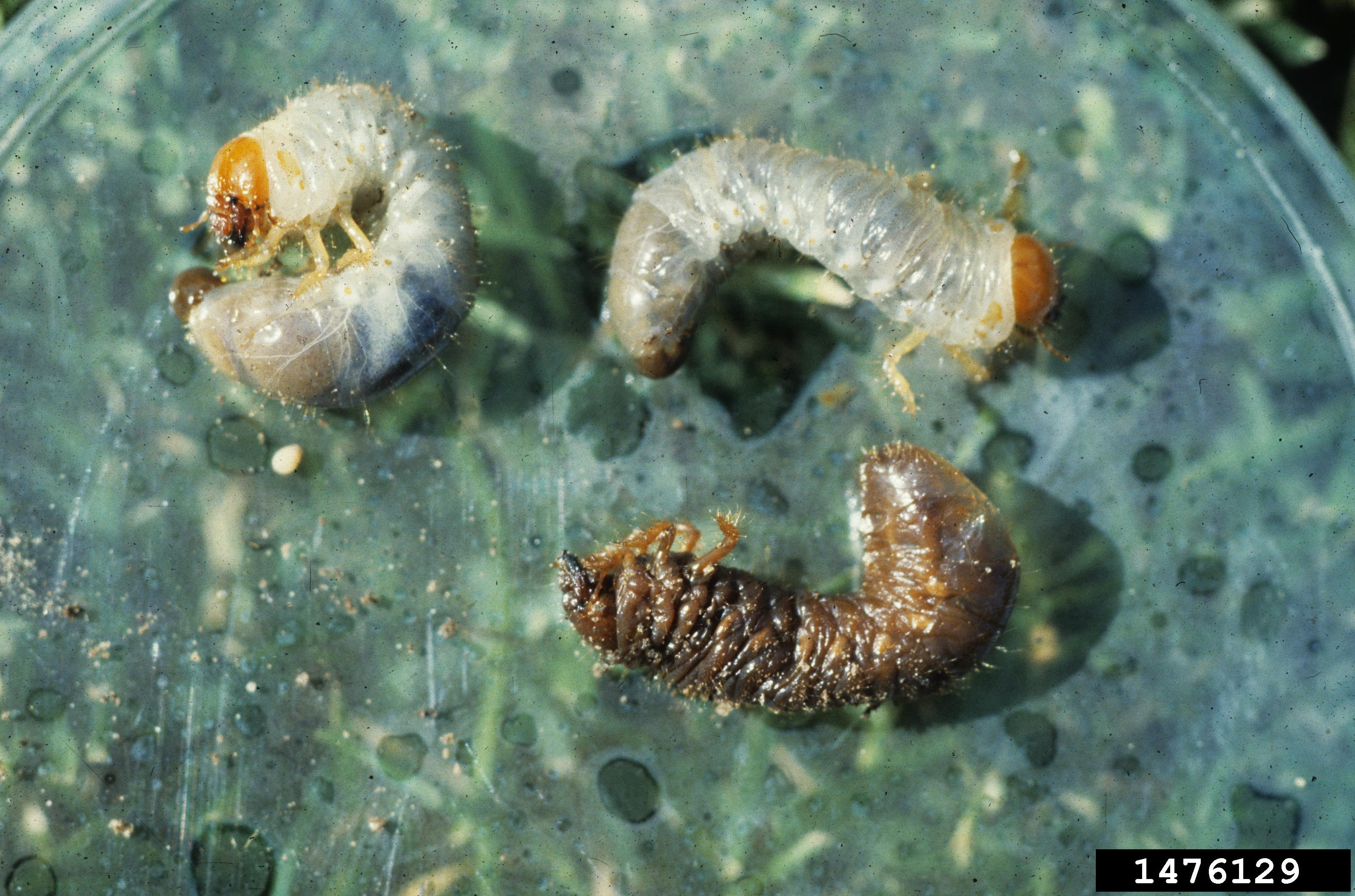
H. elegans larvae

=== Larvae ===
Hylamorpha elegans feed on organic matter in the soil, and larval growth correlated with the proportion of particulate organic matter (POM).

=== Olfaction ===
==== Odorant-binding proteins ====
The physiological aspects of H. elegans, a native Chilean scarab beetle, are tied to its ecological interactions, particularly its olfactory perception and behavior. As a relevant agricultural pest, H. elegans exhibits cryptic habits, making conventional control methods challenging. Consequently, there's a pressing need for alternative, environmentally friendly strategies. Understanding the beetle's sensory mechanisms offers promising avenues for modifying its behavior. One key aspect of this is the study of odorant-binding proteins (OBPs), which play a crucial role in the beetle's olfactory perception. These proteins, characterized by their structure and function, facilitate the recognition of odorants and their transport to olfactory receptors. Through the identification of OBPs and their interactions with volatile compounds released by its native host plant N. obliqua, researchers aim to uncover new semiochemicals that could potentially disrupt pest behavior.

Among the proteins involved in olfactory perception, OBPs stand out as crucial players. These small, soluble proteins are present in sensory organs and are characterized by their structure, which allows them to bind to odorant molecules. OBPs serve as carriers for lipophilic odorants, transporting them to olfactory receptors and initiating the olfactory process. Researchers aim to identify candidate compounds for pest control by leveraging the affinity of OBPs for specific odorants. By combining computational tools such as molecular docking and molecular dynamics, researchers can predict the interactions between OBPs and volatile compounds, providing insights into potential pest management strategies.

The focus on odorant-binding proteins (OBPs) sheds light on the beetle's olfactory perception mechanisms. Despite the prediction of six OBPs from the genome draft, only four were successfully amplified via polymerase chain reaction (PCR) from cDNA extracted from adult individuals. Notably, these transcripts exhibited higher abundance in chemosensitive tissues compared to hindleg tibia, indicating their crucial role in olfactory processes. The characterized OBPs, namely HeleOBP1, HeleOBP3, HeleOBP4, and HeleOBP6, vary in length, isoelectric point (pI), and molecular mass, reflecting their diverse functions in odorant detection and discrimination.

The identification of four novel odorant-binding proteins (OBPs) in H. elegans represents a crucial advancement, particularly considering the limited genomic information available for scarab beetle species. RT-PCR analyses revealed that these OBPs are predominantly expressed in organs associated with olfactory and gustatory senses, indicating their pivotal role in chemosensation. Notably, HeleOBP1 and HeleOBP3 exhibit heightened expression levels in the antenna, suggesting their involvement in detecting semiochemicals relevant to host-seeking and oviposition behaviors. Conversely, HeleOBP4 and HeleOBP6 show increased expression in mouthparts, potentially implicating them in the perception of feeding-related cues. These tissue-specific expression patterns provide valuable insights into the functional roles of OBPs in mediating insect behaviors related to mating, feeding, and oviposition.

The discovery of novel volatile compounds from N. obliqua leaves further enriches our understanding of H. elegans physiology. Six compounds, including beta-myrcene, beta-ocimene, dodecane, tetradecane, alpha-gurjunene, and aromadendrene, were identified, expanding the repertoire of chemicals relevant to the beetle's olfactory perception and behavior. These compounds hold promise for future analysis aimed at elucidating their roles as attractants, repellents, or pheromones in H. elegans ecology and communication.

In the context of H. elegans, understanding the physiological basis of olfactory perception is essential for developing effective pest management techniques. By mining the beetle's genome and characterizing novel OBPs, researchers can uncover key insights into its sensory mechanisms. Furthermore, by elucidating the interactions between OBPs and volatile compounds released by its preferred host plant, researchers can identify potential disruptors of pest behavior.

==== Chemoreceptors ====
Chemoreception, crucial for insect behavior such as host-seeking and mate finding, relies on specific proteins located in the H. elegans’ antennae, particularly in sensilla, which are hair-like sensory organs. These proteins, including odorant receptors (ORs), gustatory receptors (GRs), and ionotropic receptors (IRs), play essential roles in detecting volatile organic compounds (VOCs) from the environment.

Olfaction is implicated in foraging, host selection, mate finding, aggregation, and reproductive behaviors in numerous insect species. The comparative analysis of chemoreceptors, including gustatory receptors (GRs), ionotropic receptors (IRs), and odorant receptors (ORs), sheds light on the molecular basis of olfactory perception in H. elegans. Notably, H. elegans has a larger number of identified GRs compared to Brachysternus prasinus, another South American scarab beetle that lives in similar areas as H. elegans. This larger number of identified GRs in H. elegans suggests a broader repertoire for detecting sugars from various tree species, potentially influencing feeding behavior, host selection, and defense mechanisms.

In the peripheral olfactory system, sensilla houses these chemoreceptors, which are responsible for recognizing and transducing olfactory information toward the central nervous system. Among these receptors, ORs are central to mediating various behavioral responses, such as attraction or repulsion, by transducing olfactory signals.

Gustatory receptors (GRs) and ionotropic receptors (IRs) also contribute to chemoreception in insects. GRs are involved in recognizing a wide range of tastants, including bitter and sweet molecules, sugars, nutrients, and carbon dioxide. Meanwhile, IRs play diverse roles depending on the insect species, including thermal and water sensations, as well as avoidance behaviors, such as selecting oviposition sites.

Phylogenetic analysis of ionotropic receptors (IRs) reveals a diverse array of receptors in H. elegans, distributed across clades associated with gustation, olfaction, hygrosensation, and thermosensation. The presence of coreceptors such as HeleIR8a and HeleIR25a shows their importance in mediating chemosensory responses, with implications for environmental sensing and behavioral adaptations.

Sex-biased expression analysis of selected ORs provided insights into potential differences in olfactory sensitivity between male and female H. elegans. Significant expression differences were observed for certain ORs, indicating a role in mediating sex-specific behaviors or responses to environmental cues. The differential expression of ORs between male and female H. elegans suggests a role in sex-specific behaviors, including mate location and reproductive strategies.

== Interactions with humans and livestock ==
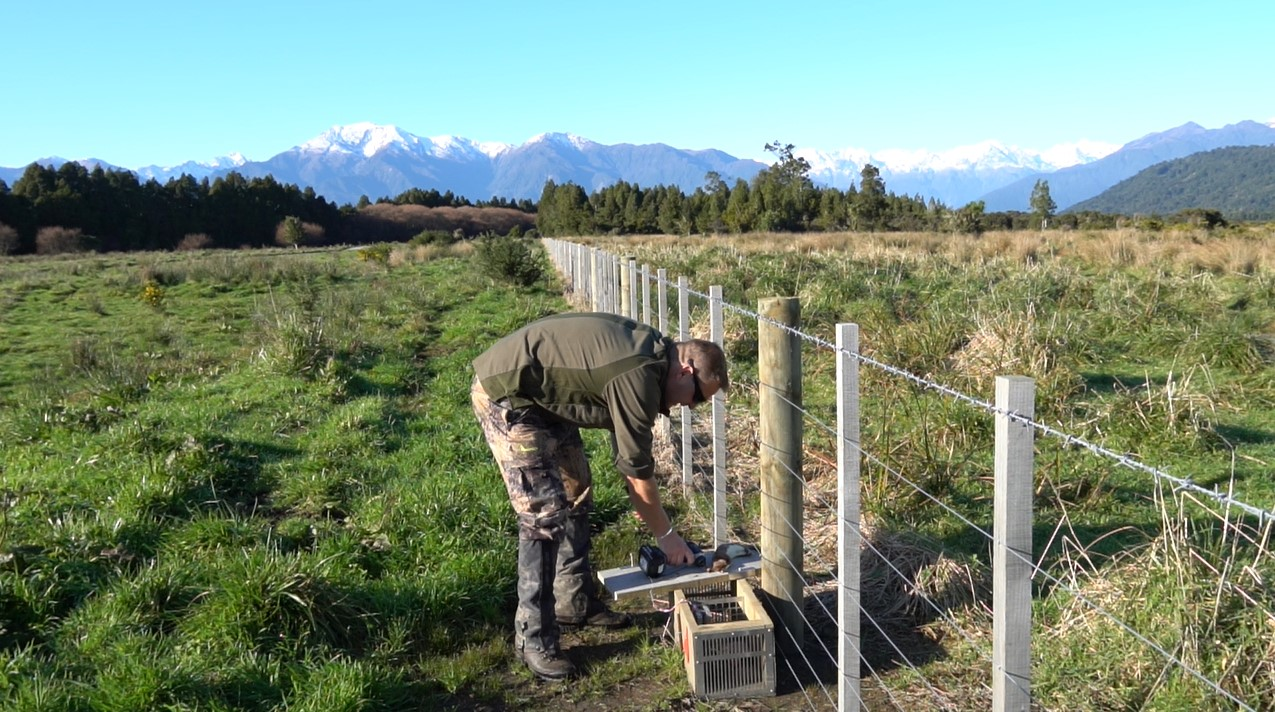
Pest control of H. elegans beetles remains challenging due to limited development of semiochemical-based strategies

The beetle poses significant challenges for both humans and livestock in Central and Southern Chile and Southwestern Argentina. The larvae of these beetles inflict severe agricultural damage by feeding on the roots of grasses and small grain cereals in Chile. The beetle is also a significant pest in berry crops and common hazel orchards, reducing crop yields and forage availability. Livestock grazing on pastures infested with these larvae may also experience indirect effects. Damage to pasture plants' roots can lead to reduced forage availability and quality, affecting livestock nutrition and productivity. Additionally, irregular outbreaks of H. elegans larvae in grasses and small grain cereals can be challenging for farmers and ranchers in maintaining viable pasturelands and cereal crops.

Additionally, their adult counterparts occasionally cause extensive defoliation on secondary host plants, particularly species of Nothofagus trees such as Nothofagus antarctica, betuloides, dombeyi, and obliqua. These adult beetles often congregate, feed, and mate in the canopy of these trees. This defoliation can result in the death of young trees.

The use of semiochemicals, such as pheromones and kairomones, for pest management has been poorly developed, adding to the challenge of mitigating their impact. Alternative strategies based on ethology, such as disrupting mating or host finding, are being explored as options for pest management. Studies have also shown that adding manure to soil, which increases the availability of labile organic matter such as particulate organic matter (POM), can reduce larval damage to pasture plants. The presence of POM may serve as an alternative food source for scarab larvae, potentially decreasing their intensity of feeding on plant roots.
