= Mesystoechus costatus =

Scientific classification
- Kingdom: Animalia
- Phylum: Arthropoda
- Clade: Pancrustacea
- Class: Insecta
- Order: Coleoptera
- Suborder: Polyphaga
- Infraorder: Scarabaeiformia
- Family: Scarabaeidae
- Genus: Mesystoechus
- Species: M. costatus

Binomial name
- Mesystoechus costatus Carne, 1958

Species of beetle

Mesystoechus costatus is a species of beetle of the family Scarabaeidae. It is found in Australia (Queensland).

== Description ==
Adults reach a length of about 10–12 mm (0.39–0.47 in) for males and 14.5 mm (0.57 in) for females. In males, the head, pronotum and scutellum are black with a green or coppery-green sheen. The elytra have pale yellowish brown striae and deep brown costate intervals. The ventral surface and pygidium are reddish brown with white setae. The legs have yellow setae. Females have a dark brown to black head, a dark brown pronotum and a lighter brown scutellum. They do not have the green sheen of the males.

== Life history ==
Adults have been recorded from January to February.
