= Platycoelia =

Scientific classification
- Kingdom: Animalia
- Phylum: Arthropoda
- Clade: Pancrustacea
- Class: Insecta
- Order: Coleoptera
- Suborder: Polyphaga
- Infraorder: Scarabaeiformia
- Family: Scarabaeidae
- Subfamily: Rutelinae
- Tribe: Anoplognathini
- Genus: Platycoelia; Dejean, 1833

Synonyms
- Callichloris (Epicallichloris) Gutiérrez, 1951; Leucopelaea Bates, 1892; Callichloris Burmeister, 1844

Genus of leaf beetles

Platycoelia is a genus of beetles belonging to the family Scarabaeidae.

== Species ==
- Platycoelia abdominalis Ohaus, 1904
- Platycoelia aenigma Smith, 2003
- Platycoelia alternans Erichson, 1847
- Platycoelia alticola (Gutiérrez, 1951)
- Platycoelia altiplana Smith, 2003
- Platycoelia baessleri (Ohaus, 1904)
- Platycoelia bocki (Ohaus, 1925)
- Platycoelia bordoni Martinez, 1976
- Platycoelia burmeisteri Arrow, 1899
- Platycoelia burmeisteriana Ohaus, 1917
- Platycoelia butleri Smith, 2003
- Platycoelia chrysotina Ohaus, 1904
- Platycoelia cochabambensis Smith, 2009
- Platycoelia confluens Ohaus, 1904
- Platycoelia convexa Smith, 2003
- Platycoelia flavohumeralis Smith, 2003
- Platycoelia flavoscutellata Ohaus, 1904
- Platycoelia flavostriata (Latreille, 1833)
- Platycoelia forcipalis Ohaus, 1904
- Platycoelia furva Smith, 2003
- Platycoelia galerana Smith, 2003
- Platycoelia gaujoni Ohaus, 1904
- Platycoelia grandicula Smith, 2003
- Platycoelia haenkei (Gutiérrez, 1952)
- Platycoelia helleri (Ohaus, 1904)
- Platycoelia hiporum Smith, 2003
- Platycoelia hirta Ohaus, 1904
- Platycoelia humeralis Bates, 1888
- Platycoelia ignota Smith, 2003
- Platycoelia inca Smith, 2003
- Platycoelia inflata Ohaus, 1904
- Platycoelia insolita Smith, 2003
- Platycoelia intermedia Ohaus, 1925
- Platycoelia interstincta Smith, 2003
- Platycoelia kirschi (Ohaus, 1904)
- Platycoelia laelaps (Gutiérrez, 1951)
- Platycoelia lutescens Blanchard, 1851
- Platycoelia marginata Burmeister, 1844
- Platycoelia meridensis Smith, 2003
- Platycoelia mesosternalis Ohaus, 1904
- Platycoelia nervosa Kirsch, 1871
- Platycoelia nigrosternalis Ohaus, 1904
- Platycoelia occidentalis Ohaus, 1904
- Platycoelia parva Kirsch, 1885
- Platycoelia paucarae Smith, 2003
- Platycoelia penai Frey, 1967
- Platycoelia peruviana Smith, 2003
- Platycoelia pomacea Erichson, 1847
- Platycoelia prasina Erichson, 1847
- Platycoelia puncticollis Ohaus, 1904
- Platycoelia pusilla Smith, 2003
- Platycoelia quadrilineata Burmeister, 1844
- Platycoelia rufosignata Ohaus, 1904
- Platycoelia sandia Smith, 2003
- Platycoelia selanderi Martinez & Martinez, 1994
- Platycoelia signaticollis (Burmeister, 1844)
- Platycoelia simplicior Ohaus, 1909
- Platycoelia steinheili Ohaus, 1904
- Platycoelia traceyae Smith, 2003
- Platycoelia unguicularis Ohaus, 1904
- Platycoelia valida Burmeister, 1844
- Platycoelia variolosa Ohaus, 1904
- Platycoelia wallisi Ohaus, 1904
