= Clilopocha angularis =

Scientific classification
- Kingdom: Animalia
- Phylum: Arthropoda
- Clade: Pancrustacea
- Class: Insecta
- Order: Coleoptera
- Suborder: Polyphaga
- Infraorder: Scarabaeiformia
- Family: Scarabaeidae
- Genus: Clilopocha
- Species: C. angularis

Binomial name
- Clilopocha angularis (Carne, 1954)

Synonyms
- Dynastomorphus angularis Carne, 1954

Species of beetle

Clilopocha angularis is a species of beetle of the family Scarabaeidae. It is found in central Australia.

== Description ==
Adults reach a length of about 8 mm (0.31 in). They are reddish-black, with the pronotum evenly and coarsely punctate.
