= Mesystoechus lithgowae =

Scientific classification
- Kingdom: Animalia
- Phylum: Arthropoda
- Clade: Pancrustacea
- Class: Insecta
- Order: Coleoptera
- Suborder: Polyphaga
- Infraorder: Scarabaeiformia
- Family: Scarabaeidae
- Genus: Mesystoechus
- Species: M. lithgowae

Binomial name
- Mesystoechus lithgowae Allsopp, 2021

Species of beetle

Mesystoechus lithgowae is a species of beetle of the family Scarabaeidae. It is found in Australia (Queensland).

== Description ==
Adults reach a length of about 9 mm (0.35 in). The clypeus, frons, and antennae are black and the pronotum is yellowish brown with a black median area and two black bands, as well as two black patches. The scutellum is yellowish brown with darker margins and the elytra are yellowish brown, with a black patch.

== Etymology ==
The species is named for naturalist and artist Grace Lithgow.
