= Bilobatus luridipennis =

Scientific classification
- Kingdom: Animalia
- Phylum: Arthropoda
- Clade: Pancrustacea
- Class: Insecta
- Order: Coleoptera
- Suborder: Polyphaga
- Infraorder: Scarabaeiformia
- Family: Scarabaeidae
- Genus: Bilobatus
- Species: B. luridipennis

Binomial name
- Bilobatus luridipennis (Waterhouse, 1878)

Synonyms
- Homotropus luridipennis Waterhouse, 1878

Species of beetle

Bilobatus luridipennis is a species of beetle of the family Scarabaeidae. It is found in Australia (Victoria, New South Wales).

== Description ==
Adults reach a length of about 10–14 mm (0.39–0.55 in). The clypeus is reddish brown, while the frons, pronotum and scutellum are nearly black with a slight green tinge. The elytra are brownish yellow with darkened intervals and lighter striae. The abdomen is yellowish brown.
