= Brachysternus =

Scientific classification
- Kingdom: Animalia
- Phylum: Arthropoda
- Clade: Pancrustacea
- Class: Insecta
- Order: Coleoptera
- Suborder: Polyphaga
- Infraorder: Scarabaeiformia
- Family: Scarabaeidae
- Subfamily: Rutelinae
- Tribe: Anoplognathini
- Subtribe: Brachysternina
- Genus: Brachysternus; Guérin-Méneville, 1831

Genus of beetles

Brachysternus is a genus of beetles belonging to the family Scarabaeidae.

== Species ==
- Brachysternus angustus (Philippi & Philippi, 1864)
- Brachysternus germaini (Ohaus, 1910)
- Brachysternus marginatus Germain, 1905
- Brachysternus olivaceus Philippi & Philippi, 1864
- Brachysternus patagoniensis Jameson & Smith, 2002
- Brachysternus prasinus Guérin-Méneville, 1830
- Brachysternus spectabilis Erichson, 1847
