= Clilopocha =

Scientific classification
- Kingdom: Animalia
- Phylum: Arthropoda
- Clade: Pancrustacea
- Class: Insecta
- Order: Coleoptera
- Suborder: Polyphaga
- Infraorder: Scarabaeiformia
- Family: Scarabaeidae
- Subfamily: Rutelinae
- Tribe: Anoplognathini
- Genus: Clilopocha; Lea, 1914

Synonyms
- Dynastomorphus Carne, 1954

Genus of leaf beetles

Clilopocha is a genus of beetles belonging to the family Scarabaeidae.

== Species ==
- Clilopocha angularis (Carne, 1954)
- Clilopocha mandibularis (Carne, 1954)
- Clilopocha pachypus (Lea, 1917)
- Clilopocha pilosicollis (Lea, 1917)
- Clilopocha whiteae Lea, 1914
