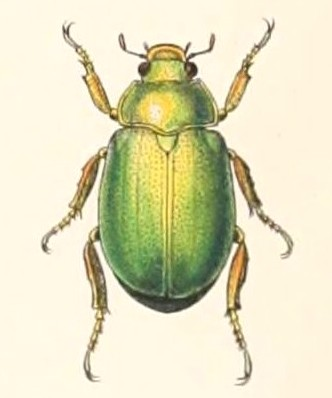
- Anoplostethus laetus

Scientific classification
- Kingdom: Animalia
- Phylum: Arthropoda
- Clade: Pancrustacea
- Class: Insecta
- Order: Coleoptera
- Suborder: Polyphaga
- Infraorder: Scarabaeiformia
- Family: Scarabaeidae
- Genus: Anoplostethus; Reiche, 1839

Synonyms
- Panschizus Blackburn, 1888; Anoplosternus Guérin-Méneville, 1838

= Anoplostethus =

Genus of beetles

Anoplostethus is a genus of beetles belonging to the family Scarabaeidae.

== Species ==
- Anoplostethus laetus Rothschild & Jordan, 1894
- Anoplostethus opalinus Brullé, 1837
- Anoplostethus roseus Blanchard, 1851

== Selected former species ==
- Anoplostethus lamprimoides White, 1841
