= Saulostomus =

Scientific classification
- Kingdom: Animalia
- Phylum: Arthropoda
- Clade: Pancrustacea
- Class: Insecta
- Order: Coleoptera
- Suborder: Polyphaga
- Infraorder: Scarabaeiformia
- Family: Scarabaeidae
- Subfamily: Rutelinae
- Tribe: Anoplognathini
- Genus: Saulostomus; Waterhouse, 1878

Genus of leaf beetles

Saulostomus is a genus of beetles belonging to the family Scarabaeidae.

== Species ==
- Saulostomus brunneoviridis Lea, 1920
- Saulostomus felschei Ohaus, 1904
- Saulostomus monteithi Carne, 1985
- Saulostomus striatus Ohaus, 1935
- Saulostomus villosus Waterhouse, 1878
