= Eosaulostomus =

Scientific classification
- Kingdom: Animalia
- Phylum: Arthropoda
- Clade: Pancrustacea
- Class: Insecta
- Order: Coleoptera
- Suborder: Polyphaga
- Infraorder: Scarabaeiformia
- Family: Scarabaeidae
- Subfamily: Rutelinae
- Tribe: Anoplognathini
- Genus: Eosaulostomus; Carne, 1956

Genus of leaf beetles

Eosaulostomus is a genus of beetles belonging to the family Scarabaeidae.

== Species ==
- Eosaulostomus collaris (Blackburn, 1892)
- Eosaulostomus excisus Carne, 1956
- Eosaulostomus halei Carne, 1956
- Eosaulostomus mimicus (Lea, 1919)
- Eosaulostomus norsemanae Carne, 1956
- Eosaulostomus weiskei (Ohaus, 1904)
