= Mesystoechus =

Scientific classification
- Kingdom: Animalia
- Phylum: Arthropoda
- Clade: Pancrustacea
- Class: Insecta
- Order: Coleoptera
- Suborder: Polyphaga
- Infraorder: Scarabaeiformia
- Family: Scarabaeidae
- Subfamily: Rutelinae
- Tribe: Anoplognathini
- Genus: Mesystoechus; Waterhouse, 1878

Genus of leaf beetles

Mesystoechus is a genus of beetles belonging to the family Scarabaeidae.

== Species ==
- Mesystoechus ciliatus Waterhouse, 1878
- Mesystoechus costatus Carne, 1958
- Mesystoechus lithgowae Allsopp, 2021
