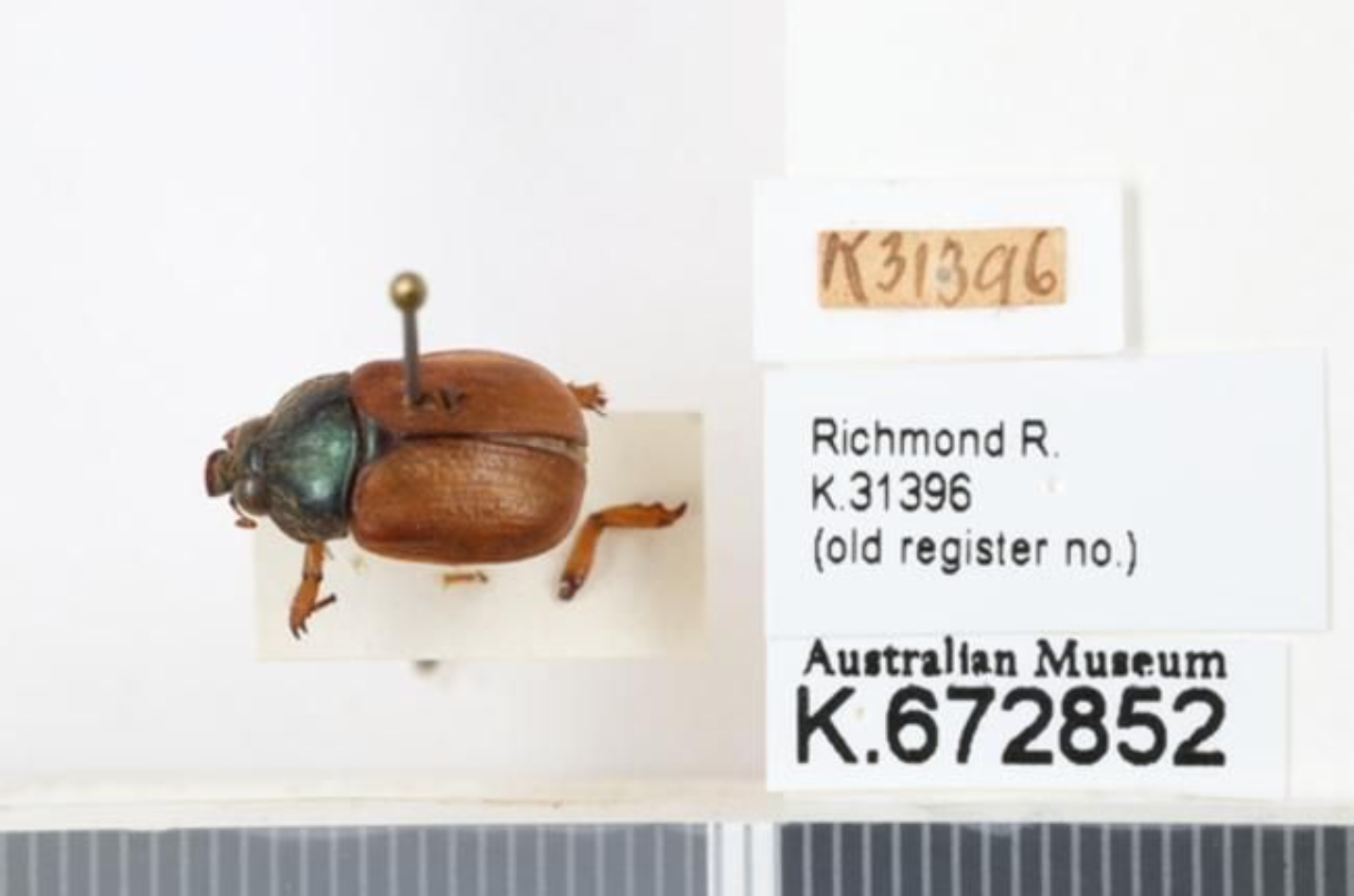

Scientific classification
- Kingdom: Animalia
- Phylum: Arthropoda
- Clade: Pancrustacea
- Class: Insecta
- Order: Coleoptera
- Suborder: Polyphaga
- Infraorder: Scarabaeiformia
- Family: Scarabaeidae
- Subfamily: Rutelinae
- Tribe: Anoplognathini
- Genus: Amblochilus; Blanchard, 1851
- Species: A. bicolor

Binomial name
- Amblochilus bicolor Blanchard, 1851

= Amblochilus =

Genus of beetles

Amblochilus is a genus of beetle of the family Scarabaeidae. It is monotypic, being represented by the single species, Amblochilus bicolor, which is found in Australia (south-eastern Queensland).

== Description ==
Adults reach a length of about 11–15 mm (0.43–0.59 in). The head, pronotum and scutellum are green, while the elytra are dark yellow brown and the pygidium and ventral surface reddish black.
