= Schizognathus =

Scientific classification
- Kingdom: Animalia
- Phylum: Arthropoda
- Clade: Pancrustacea
- Class: Insecta
- Order: Coleoptera
- Suborder: Polyphaga
- Infraorder: Scarabaeiformia
- Family: Scarabaeidae
- Subfamily: Rutelinae
- Tribe: Anoplognathini
- Genus: Schizognathus; Fischer Von Waldheim, 1823

Genus of leaf beetles

Schizognathus is a genus of beetles belonging to the family Scarabaeidae.

== Species ==
- Schizognathus apricagger Allsopp, 1989
- Schizognathus burmeisteri Ohaus, 1904
- Schizognathus compressicornis Ohaus, 1898
- Schizognathus lucidus Ohaus, 1904
- Schizognathus macleayi Fischer Von Waldheim, 1823
- Schizognathus mesosternalis Ohaus, 1912
- Schizognathus rugulosus Carne, 1958
- Schizognathus viridiaeneus Ohaus, 1904
