= Bilobatus =

Scientific classification
- Kingdom: Animalia
- Phylum: Arthropoda
- Clade: Pancrustacea
- Class: Insecta
- Order: Coleoptera
- Suborder: Polyphaga
- Infraorder: Scarabaeiformia
- Family: Scarabaeidae
- Subfamily: Rutelinae
- Tribe: Anoplognathini
- Genus: Bilobatus; Machatschke, 1970

Synonyms
- Homotropus Waterhouse, 1878

Genus of leaf beetles

Bilobatus is a genus of beetles belonging to the family Scarabaeidae.

== Species ==
- Bilobatus luridipennis (Waterhouse, 1878)
- Bilobatus testaceipennis (Ohaus, 1901)
