= Dungoorus =

Scientific classification
- Kingdom: Animalia
- Phylum: Arthropoda
- Clade: Pancrustacea
- Class: Insecta
- Order: Coleoptera
- Suborder: Polyphaga
- Infraorder: Scarabaeiformia
- Family: Scarabaeidae
- Subfamily: Rutelinae
- Tribe: Anoplognathini
- Genus: Dungoorus; Carne, 1958

Genus of leaf beetles

Dungoorus is a genus of beetles belonging to the family Scarabaeidae.

== Species ==
- Dungoorus frater Smith, 2007
- Dungoorus murrumbullus Carne, 1958
