= Mimadoretus =

Scientific classification
- Kingdom: Animalia
- Phylum: Arthropoda
- Clade: Pancrustacea
- Class: Insecta
- Order: Coleoptera
- Suborder: Polyphaga
- Infraorder: Scarabaeiformia
- Family: Scarabaeidae
- Subfamily: Rutelinae
- Tribe: Anoplognathini
- Genus: Mimadoretus; Arrow, 1901

Genus of leaf beetles

Mimadoretus is a genus of beetles belonging to the family Scarabaeidae.

== Species ==
- Mimadoretus flavomaculatus (MacLeay, 1887)
- Mimadoretus leucothyreus Lea, 1919
- Mimadoretus niveosquamosus Lea, 1919
