= Pseudoschizognathus =

Scientific classification
- Kingdom: Animalia
- Phylum: Arthropoda
- Clade: Pancrustacea
- Class: Insecta
- Order: Coleoptera
- Suborder: Polyphaga
- Infraorder: Scarabaeiformia
- Family: Scarabaeidae
- Subfamily: Rutelinae
- Tribe: Anoplognathini
- Genus: Pseudoschizognathus; Ohaus, 1904

Genus of leaf beetles

Pseudoschizognathus is a genus of beetles belonging to the family Scarabaeidae.

== Species ==
- Pseudoschizognathus lajoyi Ohaus, 1913
- Pseudoschizognathus schoenfeldti Ohaus, 1904
- Pseudoschizognathus variicollis Ohaus, 1904
