= Phalangogonia =

Scientific classification
- Kingdom: Animalia
- Phylum: Arthropoda
- Clade: Pancrustacea
- Class: Insecta
- Order: Coleoptera
- Suborder: Polyphaga
- Infraorder: Scarabaeiformia
- Family: Scarabaeidae
- Subfamily: Rutelinae
- Tribe: Anoplognathini
- Genus: Phalangogonia; Burmeister, 1844

Genus of leaf beetles

Phalangogonia is a genus of beetles belonging to the family Scarabaeidae.

== Species ==
- Phalangogonia azaharensis Smith, 2021
- Phalangogonia dispar Ohaus, 1925
- Phalangogonia hawksi Smith, 2003
- Phalangogonia jamesonae Smith & Morón, 2003
- Phalangogonia lacordairei Bates, 1888
- Phalangogonia monzoni Smith, 2021
- Phalangogonia obesa Burmeister, 1844
- Phalangogonia parilis Bates, 1888
- Phalangogonia punctata Franz, 1955
- Phalangogonia ratcliffei Smith & Morón, 2003
- Phalangogonia sperata Sharp, 1877
