= Amblyterus =

Scientific classification
- Kingdom: Animalia
- Phylum: Arthropoda
- Clade: Pancrustacea
- Class: Insecta
- Order: Coleoptera
- Suborder: Polyphaga
- Infraorder: Scarabaeiformia
- Family: Scarabaeidae
- Subfamily: Rutelinae
- Tribe: Anoplognathini
- Genus: Amblyterus; MacLeay, 1819

Genus of leaf beetles

Amblyterus is a genus of beetles belonging to the family Scarabaeidae.

== Species ==
- Amblyterus bundabergensis Carne, 1958
- Amblyterus cicatricosus (Gyllenhal, 1817)
- Amblyterus clypealis Ohaus, 1904
- Amblyterus deuqueti Carne, 1958
- Amblyterus paluma Allsopp, 1992
- Amblyterus paradoxus Carne, 1975
- Amblyterus simplicitarsus Carne, 1958
- Amblyterus tarsalis Lea, 1919
- Amblyterus tibialis Carne, 1958
