= List of Diplotaxis species =

This is a list of 250 species in the scarab beetle genus Diplotaxis.

== Diplotaxis species ==
- Diplotaxis abnormis Fall, 1909
- Diplotaxis academia Vaurie, 1960
- Diplotaxis aenea Blanchard, 1851
- Diplotaxis aequalis Cazier, 1940
- Diplotaxis aereomicans Moser, 1918
- Diplotaxis alphamartinezi Delgado, 1990
- Diplotaxis alutacea Bates, 1887
- Diplotaxis ambigua Fall, 1909
- Diplotaxis amecameca Vaurie, 1960
- Diplotaxis angularis LeConte, 1856
- Diplotaxis angustula Moser, 1918
- Diplotaxis anneae Mccleve, 1993
- Diplotaxis anthracina Fall, 1909
- Diplotaxis anxia (LeConte, 1856)
- Diplotaxis anxius (LeConte, 1856)
- Diplotaxis arctifrons Bates, 1888
- Diplotaxis arizonica Schaeffer, 1907
- Diplotaxis assimilis Vaurie, 1960
- Diplotaxis atlantis Fall, 1909
- Diplotaxis atramentaria Bates, 1887
- Diplotaxis atratula LeConte, 1856
- Diplotaxis aulacochela Cazier, 1940
- Diplotaxis aurata Bates, 1887
- Diplotaxis aurora Wickham, 1913
- Diplotaxis australis Vaurie, 1960
- Diplotaxis bakeri Cazier, 1940
- Diplotaxis barbarae Vaurie and Cazier, 1955
- Diplotaxis basalis Fall, 1909
- Diplotaxis belfragei Fall, 1909
- Diplotaxis beyeri Schaeffer, 1907
- Diplotaxis bicolor Bates, 1887
- Diplotaxis bidentata LeConte, 1856
- Diplotaxis bifida Vaurie, 1960
- Diplotaxis blanchardi Vaurie, 1956
- Diplotaxis boops Bates, 1888
- Diplotaxis bowditchi Fall, 1909
- Diplotaxis brachyptera Vaurie, 1960
- Diplotaxis brevicollis LeConte, 1856
- Diplotaxis brevicornis Cazier, 1940
- Diplotaxis brevidens LeConte, 1856
- Diplotaxis brevipilosa Moser, 1918
- Diplotaxis brevisetosa Linell, 1896
- Diplotaxis caelestis Delgado and Capistran, 1993
- Diplotaxis carbonata LeConte, 1856
- Diplotaxis carinata Vaurie, 1958
- Diplotaxis carinifrons Bates, 1887
- Diplotaxis catarinas Vaurie and Cazier, 1955
- Diplotaxis cavifrons Moser, 1918
- Diplotaxis chiricahuae Fall, 1909
- Diplotaxis circulans Vaurie, 1960
- Diplotaxis clypeata Bates, 1888
- Diplotaxis coenonychoides Davidson and Davidson, 2006
- Diplotaxis commixta Vaurie, 1960
- Diplotaxis completa Cazier, 1940
- Diplotaxis concava Vaurie, 1960
- Diplotaxis conformis Fall, 1909
- Diplotaxis confusa Fall, 1909
- Diplotaxis connata Schaeffer, 1905
- Diplotaxis consentanea Bates, 1887
- Diplotaxis consequens (Walker, 1866)
- Diplotaxis contracta Bates, 1888
- Diplotaxis convexilabra Vaurie and Cazier, 1955
- Diplotaxis convexilabrum Vaurie & Cazier, 1955
- Diplotaxis corbula Vaurie, 1960
- Diplotaxis coriacea Bates, 1888
- Diplotaxis corrosa Bates, 1887
- Diplotaxis corvina LeConte, 1856
- Diplotaxis costanera Vaurie, 1958
- Diplotaxis cribatella Bates, 1889
- Diplotaxis cribratella Bates, 1887
- Diplotaxis cribraticollis Blanchard, 1851
- Diplotaxis cribriceps Bates, 1887
- Diplotaxis cribulosa LeConte, 1856
- Diplotaxis crinigera Bates, 1888
- Diplotaxis crucis Vaurie, 1960
- Diplotaxis curvaticeps Fall, 1909
- Diplotaxis dahli Cazier, 1940
- Diplotaxis decima Vaurie and Cazier, 1955
- Diplotaxis denigrata Bates, 1889
- Diplotaxis dentella Fall, 1909
- Diplotaxis denticeps Bates, 1887
- Diplotaxis dentipes Bates, 1887
- Diplotaxis deserta Fall, 1932
- Diplotaxis dissona Vaurie, 1960
- Diplotaxis dubia LeConte, 1856
- Diplotaxis durango Vaurie, 1960
- Diplotaxis elongata Vaurie, 1960
- Diplotaxis errans Fall, 1909
- Diplotaxis exstans Vaurie, 1960
- Diplotaxis femoralis Vaurie, 1960
- Diplotaxis fimbriata Fall, 1909
- Diplotaxis fissilabris Fall, 1909
- Diplotaxis fissilis Vaurie and Cazier, 1955
- Diplotaxis flavisetis Bates, 1887
- Diplotaxis flexa Vaurie, 1960
- Diplotaxis fossifrons Moser, 1918
- Diplotaxis fossipalpa Fall, 1909
- Diplotaxis foveicollis Moser, 1918
- Diplotaxis frondicola (Say, 1825)
- Diplotaxis fulva (LeConte, 1856)
- Diplotaxis geos Mccleve, 1993
- Diplotaxis glabrimargo Vaurie and Cazier, 1955
- Diplotaxis guatemalica Moser, 1918
- Diplotaxis hallei Vaurie, 1958
- Diplotaxis harperi Blanchard, 1851
- Diplotaxis haydeni LeConte, 1856
- Diplotaxis haydenii LeConte, 1856
- Diplotaxis hebes Bates, 1888
- Diplotaxis hirsuta Vaurie, 1958
- Diplotaxis hirtipes Vaurie, 1960
- Diplotaxis icarus Mccleve, 1993
- Diplotaxis iguala Vaurie, 1960
- Diplotaxis illustris Fall, 1909
- Diplotaxis impar Vaurie and Cazier, 1955
- Diplotaxis incisa Vaurie, 1960
- Diplotaxis incuria Fall, 1932
- Diplotaxis indigena Vaurie and Cazier, 1955
- Diplotaxis ingenua Fall, 1909
- Diplotaxis insignis LeConte, 1861
- Diplotaxis jacala Vaurie, 1958
- Diplotaxis jamaicensis Cazier, 1952
- Diplotaxis jardeli Delgado & Rivera, 1992
- Diplotaxis juquilensis Bates, 1887
- Diplotaxis knausi Schaeffer, 1907
- Diplotaxis knausii Schaeffer, 1907
- Diplotaxis kuschei Vaurie, 1960
- Diplotaxis kuschel Vaurie, 1960
- Diplotaxis laevivertex Bates, 1887
- Diplotaxis languida LeConte, 1878
- Diplotaxis latispina Vaurie, 1960
- Diplotaxis lengi Fall, 1909
- Diplotaxis lengii Fall, 1909
- Diplotaxis levicosta Fall, 1909
- Diplotaxis liberta (Germar, 1824)
- Diplotaxis macronycha Fall, 1909
- Diplotaxis macrotarsus Vaurie, 1960
- Diplotaxis magna Bates, 1888
- Diplotaxis marginicollis Fall, 1909
- Diplotaxis marina Vaurie, 1960
- Diplotaxis martinezi Delgado and Capistran, 1993
- Diplotaxis mascula Vaurie, 1960
- Diplotaxis maura Fall, 1909
- Diplotaxis maya Vaurie, 1958
- Diplotaxis mediafusca Vaurie, 1960
- Diplotaxis megapleura Vaurie, 1958
- Diplotaxis mentalis Fall, 1909
- Diplotaxis metallescens Bates, 1887
- Diplotaxis mexcala Vaurie, 1960
- Diplotaxis microchele Vaurie, 1960
- Diplotaxis microtrichia Moser, 1921
- Diplotaxis mima Vaurie and Cazier, 1955
- Diplotaxis mimosae Fall, 1909
- Diplotaxis misella Fall, 1909
- Diplotaxis missionaria Vaurie, 1960
- Diplotaxis mistura Vaurie, 1960
- Diplotaxis moerens LeConte, 1856
- Diplotaxis monticola Delgado, 2001
- Diplotaxis multicarinata Delgado & Mora-Aguilar, 2012
- Diplotaxis muricata Schaeffer, 1907
- Diplotaxis mus Fall, 1932
- Diplotaxis nigriventris Bates, 1887
- Diplotaxis nitidicollis Blanchard, 1851
- Diplotaxis obregon Vaurie, 1958
- Diplotaxis obscura LeConte, 1859
- Diplotaxis ohausi Moser, 1921
- Diplotaxis pacata LeConte, 1856
- Diplotaxis pala Vaurie, 1960
- Diplotaxis parallela Fall, 1909
- Diplotaxis parpolita Vaurie, 1960
- Diplotaxis parvicollis Fall, 1909
- Diplotaxis parvula Burmeister, 1855
- Diplotaxis patyvauriea Delgado, 1990
- Diplotaxis persisae Cazier, 1940
- Diplotaxis pilifera (Burmeister, 1855)
- Diplotaxis pilipennis Moser, 1918
- Diplotaxis pinalica Fall, 1932
- Diplotaxis planidens Fall, 1909
- Diplotaxis polita Fall, 1909
- Diplotaxis poropyge Bates, 1887
- Diplotaxis profunda Vaurie and Cazier, 1955
- Diplotaxis puberea (Bates, 1887)
- Diplotaxis puberula LeConte, 1863
- Diplotaxis pubipes Schaeffer, 1907
- Diplotaxis pumila Fall, 1909
- Diplotaxis punctata LeConte, 1856
- Diplotaxis punctatorugosa Blanchard, 1851
- Diplotaxis puncticeps Moser, 1918
- Diplotaxis puncticollis Moser, 1918
- Diplotaxis punctipennis LeConte, 1856
- Diplotaxis punctulata Horn, 1894
- Diplotaxis pygidialis Vaurie, 1960
- Diplotaxis residua Fall, 1909
- Diplotaxis rex Vaurie, 1958
- Diplotaxis rita Vaurie, 1958
- Diplotaxis riusi Delgado, 2011
- Diplotaxis roberti Vaurie, 1960
- Diplotaxis robertmarki Davidson and Davidson, 2006
- Diplotaxis rockefelleri Vaurie and Cazier, 1955
- Diplotaxis rosae Vaurie and Cazier, 1955
- Diplotaxis rotunda Vaurie, 1960
- Diplotaxis rudis (LeConte, 1859)
- Diplotaxis rufa Linell, 1895
- Diplotaxis rufiola Fall, 1909
- Diplotaxis rufipes Moser, 1921
- Diplotaxis rugosifrons Moser, 1918
- Diplotaxis rugosipennis Blanchard, 1851
- Diplotaxis saltensis Vaurie, 1960
- Diplotaxis saylori Cazier, 1940
- Diplotaxis schaefferi Fall, 1909
- Diplotaxis selanderi Vaurie, 1958
- Diplotaxis semifoveata Fall, 1909
- Diplotaxis sierrae Fall, 1909
- Diplotaxis simillima Moser, 1921
- Diplotaxis simplex Blanchard, 1851
- Diplotaxis simplicipes Wickham, 1912
- Diplotaxis sinuans Vaurie, 1960
- Diplotaxis sonora Vaurie, 1960
- Diplotaxis sordida (Say, 1825)
- Diplotaxis sparsa Vaurie, 1960
- Diplotaxis spina Vaurie, 1958
- Diplotaxis squamisetis Delgado & Capistran, 1992
- Diplotaxis statura Cazier, 1940
- Diplotaxis subangulata LeConte, 1856
- Diplotaxis subcostata Blanchard, 1851
- Diplotaxis subrugata Moser, 1918
- Diplotaxis sulcatula Fall, 1909
- Diplotaxis superflua Vaurie, 1960
- Diplotaxis tarascana Vaurie, 1958
- Diplotaxis tarsalis Schaeffer, 1907
- Diplotaxis tehuana Vaurie, 1960
- Diplotaxis tenebrosa Fall, 1909
- Diplotaxis tenuis LeConte, 1856
- Diplotaxis tepicana Moser, 1918
- Diplotaxis texana LeConte, 1856
- Diplotaxis thoracica Fall, 1909
- Diplotaxis trapezifera Bates, 1887
- Diplotaxis trementina Fall, 1909
- Diplotaxis tristis Kirby, 1837
- Diplotaxis truncatula LeConte, 1856
- Diplotaxis tumida Vaurie, 1960
- Diplotaxis turgidula Vaurie, 1960
- Diplotaxis tzitzio Vaurie, 1960
- Diplotaxis ungulata Cazier, 1940
- Diplotaxis urbana Vaurie, 1960
- Diplotaxis vandykei Vaurie, 1958
- Diplotaxis veracruzana Vaurie, 1960
- Diplotaxis xalapensis Delgado & Capistran, 1992
- Diplotaxis yucateca Vaurie, 1960
- Diplotaxis zapoteca Vaurie, 1958
- Diplotaxis zeteki Vaurie, 1958
