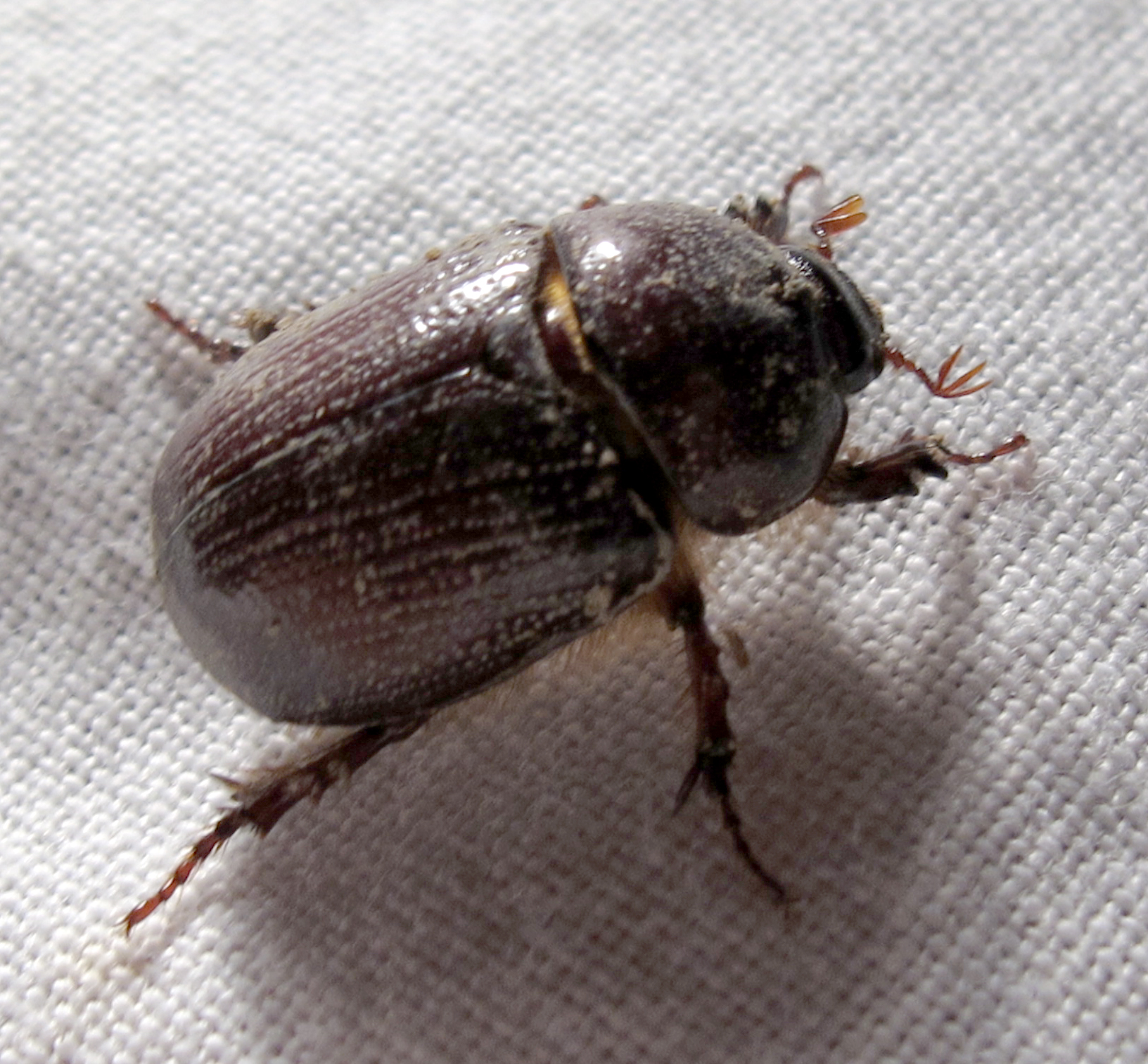

Scientific classification
- Kingdom: Animalia
- Phylum: Arthropoda
- Clade: Pancrustacea
- Class: Insecta
- Order: Coleoptera
- Suborder: Polyphaga
- Infraorder: Scarabaeiformia
- Family: Scarabaeidae
- Subfamily: Melolonthinae
- Tribe: Diplotaxini
- Genus: Diplotaxis
- Species: D. sordida

Binomial name
- Diplotaxis sordida (Say, 1825)

Synonyms
- Diplotaxis carbonaria Burmeister, 1855; Diplotaxis rugosioides Schaeffer, 1907

= Diplotaxis sordida =

Species of beetle

Diplotaxis sordida is a species of scarab beetle in the family Scarabaeidae. It is found in North America.
