= Metapogonia parvula =

Scientific classification
- Kingdom: Animalia
- Phylum: Arthropoda
- Clade: Pancrustacea
- Class: Insecta
- Order: Coleoptera
- Suborder: Polyphaga
- Infraorder: Scarabaeiformia
- Family: Scarabaeidae
- Genus: Metapogonia
- Species: M. parvula

Binomial name
- Metapogonia parvula (Moser, 1917)

Synonyms
- Metagonia parvula Moser, 1917

Species of beetle

Metapogonia parvula is a species of beetle of the family Scarabaeidae. It is found in Tanzania.

== Description ==
Adults reach a length of about 5.5 mm. They are of the same size and shape as Metapogonia zambesiana, but somewhat darker in colour. The head is moderately densely covered with strong punctures and the punctures on the pronotum are also quite strong and not quite as dense as in M. zambesiana. The elytra are irregularly, but rather strongly punctured. The underside shows a fine, leathery sculpture. It is very broad in the middle, becoming somewhat more densely covered with spots towards the sides, each with small, light-coloured scale-like setae.
