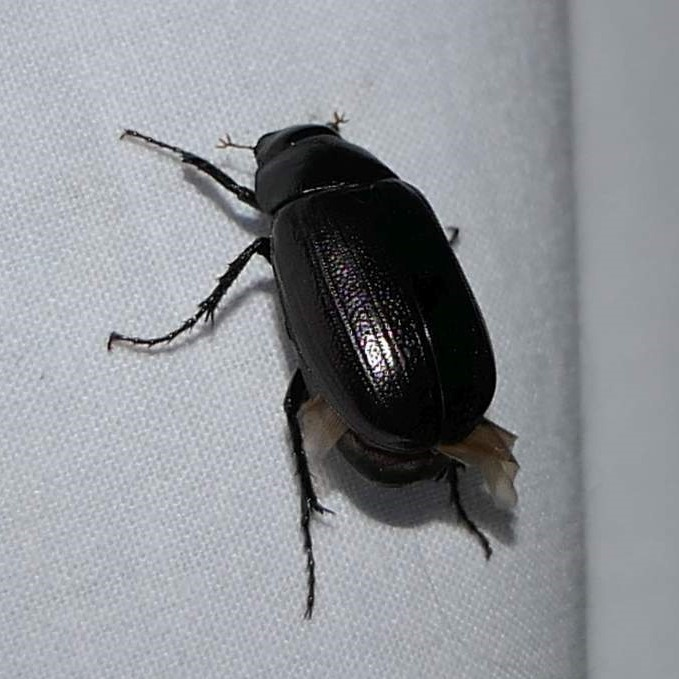

Scientific classification
- Kingdom: Animalia
- Phylum: Arthropoda
- Clade: Pancrustacea
- Class: Insecta
- Order: Coleoptera
- Suborder: Polyphaga
- Infraorder: Scarabaeiformia
- Family: Scarabaeidae
- Genus: Diplotaxis
- Species: D. tristis

Binomial name
- Diplotaxis tristis Kirby, 1837

Synonyms
- Diplotaxis corpulenta Burmeister, 1855

= Diplotaxis tristis =

Species of beetle

Diplotaxis tristis is a species of scarab beetle in the family Scarabaeidae. It is found in North America.
