= Brachypholis sjoestedti =

Scientific classification
- Kingdom: Animalia
- Phylum: Arthropoda
- Clade: Pancrustacea
- Class: Insecta
- Order: Coleoptera
- Suborder: Polyphaga
- Infraorder: Scarabaeiformia
- Family: Scarabaeidae
- Genus: Brachypholis
- Species: B. sjoestedti

Binomial name
- Brachypholis sjoestedti Brenske, 1903

Species of beetle

Brachypholis sjoestedti is a species of beetle of the family Scarabaeidae. It is found in Cameroon, Ghana and Ivory Coast.

== Description ==
Adults reach a length of about 14–17 mm (0.55–0.67 in). They are very similar to Brachypholis rothschildi, but with finer, lanceolate scaling. There are distinct spots at the base of the pronotum and two large, similar spots on the lateral margins of the elytra.
