= Dichecephala kristenseni =

Scientific classification
- Kingdom: Animalia
- Phylum: Arthropoda
- Clade: Pancrustacea
- Class: Insecta
- Order: Coleoptera
- Suborder: Polyphaga
- Infraorder: Scarabaeiformia
- Family: Scarabaeidae
- Genus: Dichecephala
- Species: D. kristenseni

Binomial name
- Dichecephala kristenseni Moser, 1917

Species of beetle

Dichecephala kristenseni is a species of beetle of the family Scarabaeidae. It is found in Ethiopia.

== Description ==
Adults reach a length of about 7.5 mm. They are similar to Dichecephala abyssinica in colour and shape, but the punctation of the head is denser and stronger. The pronotum is densely punctate and the elytra are strongly punctate, the ribs enclosed by rows of closely spaced punctures. The underside is rather widely punctate in the middle, becoming more closely and coarsely punctured towards the sides. The punctures are bristly.
