= Diplotaxini =

Scientific classification
- Kingdom: Animalia
- Phylum: Arthropoda
- Clade: Pancrustacea
- Class: Insecta
- Order: Coleoptera
- Suborder: Polyphaga
- Infraorder: Scarabaeiformia
- Family: Scarabaeidae
- Subfamily: Melolonthinae
- Tribe: Diplotaxini; Kirby, 1837

Tribe of beetles

Diplotaxini is a tribe in the May beetles and junebugs group, in the family Scarabaeidae. There is at least one genus and at least 150 described species in Diplotaxini.

== Genera ==
- Apogonia Kirby, 1819
- Brachypholis Brenske, 1898
- Careocallus Cherman & Basílio & Clarkson & Agostinis & Smith & Vaz-De-Mello & Almeida, 2024
- Careocallus Cherman, 2023
- Ceratogonia Kolbe, 1899
- Clypeasta Fairmaire, 1904
- Comatapogonia Lacroix, 2008
- Dichecephala Brenske, 1895
- Diplotaxis Kirby, 1837
- Empecta Erichson, 1847
- Empectoides Dewailly, 1950
- Epipholis Moser, 1917
- Homalochilus Blanchard, 1851
- Idiapogonia Arrow, 1916
- Liogenys Guérin-Méneville, 1831
- Metapogonia Lacroix, 2008
- Pachrodema Blanchard, 1851
- Pacuvia Curtis, 1844
- Pseudodiplotaxis Nonfried, 1894
- Rhynchapogonia Lacroix, 2008
- Tanzanipholis Lacroix, 2002
