= Epipholis =

Scientific classification
- Kingdom: Animalia
- Phylum: Arthropoda
- Clade: Pancrustacea
- Class: Insecta
- Order: Coleoptera
- Suborder: Polyphaga
- Infraorder: Scarabaeiformia
- Family: Scarabaeidae
- Subfamily: Melolonthinae
- Tribe: Diplotaxini
- Genus: Epipholis; Moser, 1917
- Species: E. assiniensis

Binomial name
- Epipholis assiniensis Moser, 1917

Genus of beetles

Epipholis is a genus of beetle of the family Scarabaeidae. It is monotypic, being represented by the single species, Epipholis assiniensis, which is found in Ivory Coast.

== Description ==
Adults reach a length of about 13–14 mm (0.51–0.55 in). They are brown or blackish-brown and glossy. The head is densely covered with erect, yellowish-brown scales. The clypeus is somewhat broadened anteriorly, the anterior margin is upturned and broadly rounded, the anterior angles are very short and rounded, almost angular. The antennae are brown. The pronotum is slightly wider than long between the posterior angles, strongly arched in the middle, the lateral margins are very weakly indented behind the middle, and the anterior and posterior angles are obtuse. The base is only very slightly curved towards the scutellum. The surface is covered with erect, yellowish-brown scales. An indistinct median longitudinal band and an indistinct lateral band on each side are somewhat lighter. The scutellum is semicircular and sparsely covered with scale-like setae. The elytra are striated and moderately densely covered with egg-shaped, whitish scales. The pygidium is also striated, and the scales on it are bristle-like. The thorax and legs are covered with whitish bristles.
