= Dichecephala lujai =

Scientific classification
- Kingdom: Animalia
- Phylum: Arthropoda
- Clade: Pancrustacea
- Class: Insecta
- Order: Coleoptera
- Suborder: Polyphaga
- Infraorder: Scarabaeiformia
- Family: Scarabaeidae
- Genus: Dichecephala
- Species: D. lujai

Binomial name
- Dichecephala lujai Moser, 1917

Species of beetle

Dichecephala lujai is a species of beetle of the family Scarabaeidae. It is found in Mozambique.

== Description ==
Adults reach a length of about 6 mm. They are reddish-brown and shiny. The head is sparsely punctate. The pronotum is moderately densely punctate and the elytra are irregularly and coarsely punctate, with smooth ribs. The underside is widely punctured in the middle, becoming more densely punctured at the sides; the punctures are covered with small, whitish setae.
