= Metapogonia kaszabi =

Scientific classification
- Kingdom: Animalia
- Phylum: Arthropoda
- Clade: Pancrustacea
- Class: Insecta
- Order: Coleoptera
- Suborder: Polyphaga
- Infraorder: Scarabaeiformia
- Family: Scarabaeidae
- Genus: Metapogonia
- Species: M. kaszabi

Binomial name
- Metapogonia kaszabi (Frey, 1974)

Synonyms
- Apogonia kaszabi Frey, 1974

Species of beetle

Metapogonia kaszabi is a species of beetle of the family Scarabaeidae. It is found in Tanzania.

== Description ==
Adults reach a length of about 5–6 mm. The upper and lower surfaces are light reddish-brown and shiny and the antennae are yellow. The upper surface is glabrous, with very short setae or hairs on the ventral segments and at the pygidium tip. The pronotum is densely punctate laterally and much more sparsely punctate on the disc. The elytra are moderately densely punctate.
