= Metapogonia bayeri =

Scientific classification
- Kingdom: Animalia
- Phylum: Arthropoda
- Clade: Pancrustacea
- Class: Insecta
- Order: Coleoptera
- Suborder: Polyphaga
- Infraorder: Scarabaeiformia
- Family: Scarabaeidae
- Genus: Metapogonia
- Species: M. bayeri

Binomial name
- Metapogonia bayeri (Moser, 1917)

Synonyms
- Metagonia bayeri Moser, 1917

Species of beetle

Metapogonia bayeri is a species of beetle of the family Scarabaeidae. It is found in the Democratic Republic of the Congo and Uganda.

== Description ==
Adults reach a length of about 5.5–6 mm. They are brown or blackish-brown and shiny. The antennae are yellowish-brown. The pronotum has moderately dense, but sometimes also quite closely spaced, punctation. The elytra are strongly punctate, the smooth ribs indented by rows of punctures. The underside is widely punctate in the middle, more densely at the sides. The punctures have pale setae.
