= Dichecephala heteropyga =

Scientific classification
- Kingdom: Animalia
- Phylum: Arthropoda
- Clade: Pancrustacea
- Class: Insecta
- Order: Coleoptera
- Suborder: Polyphaga
- Infraorder: Scarabaeiformia
- Family: Scarabaeidae
- Genus: Dichecephala
- Species: D. heteropyga

Binomial name
- Dichecephala heteropyga Moser, 1917

Species of beetle

Dichecephala heteropyga is a species of beetle of the family Scarabaeidae. It is found in Kenya, the Democratic Republic of the Congo, Rwanda, Tanzania and Uganda.

== Description ==
Adults reach a length of about 7 mm. They are yellowish-brown and shiny. The head is finely punctate. The pronotum is quite densely punctured and the elytra are punctate, with unpunctate, narrow ribs, which are indented by rows of closely spaced punctures.
