= Diplotaxis fimbriata =

Scientific classification
- Kingdom: Animalia
- Phylum: Arthropoda
- Clade: Pancrustacea
- Class: Insecta
- Order: Coleoptera
- Suborder: Polyphaga
- Infraorder: Scarabaeiformia
- Family: Scarabaeidae
- Genus: Diplotaxis
- Species: D. fimbriata

Binomial name
- Diplotaxis fimbriata Fall, 1909

Synonyms
- Diplotaxis arta Cazier, 1940

Species of beetle

Diplotaxis fimbriata is a species of May beetle or junebug in the family Scarabaeidae. It is found in Central America and North America.
