= Diplotaxis beyeri =

Scientific classification
- Kingdom: Animalia
- Phylum: Arthropoda
- Clade: Pancrustacea
- Class: Insecta
- Order: Coleoptera
- Suborder: Polyphaga
- Infraorder: Scarabaeiformia
- Family: Scarabaeidae
- Genus: Diplotaxis
- Species: D. beyeri

Binomial name
- Diplotaxis beyeri Schaeffer, 1907

Species of beetle

Diplotaxis beyeri is a species of scarab beetle in the family Scarabaeidae. It is found in Central America and North America.
