= Dichecephala bilaminifrons =

Scientific classification
- Kingdom: Animalia
- Phylum: Arthropoda
- Clade: Pancrustacea
- Class: Insecta
- Order: Coleoptera
- Suborder: Polyphaga
- Infraorder: Scarabaeiformia
- Family: Scarabaeidae
- Genus: Dichecephala
- Species: D. bilaminifrons

Binomial name
- Dichecephala bilaminifrons (Ancey, 1883)

Synonyms
- Rhinhyptia bilaminifrons Ancey, 1883; Dichecephala abyssinica Brenske, 1895

Species of beetle

Dichecephala bilaminifrons is a species of beetle of the family Scarabaeidae. It is found in Ethiopia, Kenya and the Democratic Republic of the Congo.

== Description ==
Ernst Brenske described Dichecephala abyssinica, which is now considered a synonym of bilaminifrons in 1895. He described it as having an oblong, yellow, and shining body, with an elongated, strongly narrowed, bilobed, and sparsely punctate clypeus and a concave, lightly punctate frons, a nearly rounded thorax with slightly rounded sides and a membranous anterior pronotal margin.
