= Dichecephala somalina =

Scientific classification
- Kingdom: Animalia
- Phylum: Arthropoda
- Clade: Pancrustacea
- Class: Insecta
- Order: Coleoptera
- Suborder: Polyphaga
- Infraorder: Scarabaeiformia
- Family: Scarabaeidae
- Genus: Dichecephala
- Species: D. somalina

Binomial name
- Dichecephala somalina (Frey, 1976)

Synonyms
- Apogonia (Catagonia) somalina Frey, 1976

Species of beetle

Dichecephala somalina is a species of beetle of the family Scarabaeidae. It is found in Somalia.

== Description ==
Adults reach a length of about 5 mm (0.20 in). The upper and lower surfaces are glossy yellowish-brown, with the clypeus darker. The head, including the clypeus, is sparsely, irregularly, and moderately punctate.
