= Dichecephala ovata =

Scientific classification
- Kingdom: Animalia
- Phylum: Arthropoda
- Clade: Pancrustacea
- Class: Insecta
- Order: Coleoptera
- Suborder: Polyphaga
- Infraorder: Scarabaeiformia
- Family: Scarabaeidae
- Genus: Dichecephala
- Species: D. ovata

Binomial name
- Dichecephala ovata (Fåhraeus, 1857)

Synonyms
- Apogonia ovata Fåhraeus, 1857; Apogonia (Ceratogonia) kolbei Kraatz, 1899; Apogonia kraatzi Dalla Torre, 1912

Species of beetle

Dichecephala ovata is a species of beetle of the family Scarabaeidae. It is found in South Africa (Free State, Mpumalanga, North West, Limpopo, KwaZulu-Natal) and Zimbabwe.

== Description ==
Adults reach a length of about 7–7.5 mm (0.28–0.30 in). They are chestnut or reddish-brown, with a strong metallic tinge. The club of the antennae is flavescent and the head and pronotum are covered with fine, although deep punctures, separated by a smooth interval, nearly equal in width to their own diameter. The scutellum is finely but not densely punctate. The elytra are covered with deep, round, somewhat closely-set punctures, and have on each elytron two dorsal costules, edged on either side by a regular row of punctures. The underside is coarsely punctate.
