= Dichecephala =

Scientific classification
- Kingdom: Animalia
- Phylum: Arthropoda
- Clade: Pancrustacea
- Class: Insecta
- Order: Coleoptera
- Suborder: Polyphaga
- Infraorder: Scarabaeiformia
- Family: Scarabaeidae
- Subfamily: Melolonthinae
- Tribe: Diplotaxini
- Genus: Dichecephala; Brenske, 1895

Synonyms
- Apogonia (Catagonia) Kolbe, 1899

Genus of leaf beetles

Dichecephala is a genus of beetles belonging to the family Scarabaeidae.

== Species ==
- Dichecephala bilaminifrons (Ancey, 1883)
- Dichecephala collarti Burgeon, 1945
- Dichecephala heteropyga Moser, 1917
- Dichecephala kristenseni Moser, 1917
- Dichecephala lujai Moser, 1917
- Dichecephala moseri (Ritsema, 1912)
- Dichecephala nasalis (Karsch, 1882)
- Dichecephala ovata (Fåhraeus, 1857)
- Dichecephala somalina (Frey, 1976)
- Dichecephala tanganikana Burgeon, 1945
- Dichecephala tridentipes Burgeon, 1945
