= Diplotaxis languida =

Scientific classification
- Kingdom: Animalia
- Phylum: Arthropoda
- Clade: Pancrustacea
- Class: Insecta
- Order: Coleoptera
- Suborder: Polyphaga
- Infraorder: Scarabaeiformia
- Family: Scarabaeidae
- Genus: Diplotaxis
- Species: D. languida

Binomial name
- Diplotaxis languida LeConte, 1878

Species of beetle

Diplotaxis languida is a species of scarab beetle in the family Scarabaeidae. It is found in North America.
