= Diplotaxis punctatorugosa =

Scientific classification
- Kingdom: Animalia
- Phylum: Arthropoda
- Clade: Pancrustacea
- Class: Insecta
- Order: Coleoptera
- Suborder: Polyphaga
- Infraorder: Scarabaeiformia
- Family: Scarabaeidae
- Genus: Diplotaxis
- Species: D. punctatorugosa

Binomial name
- Diplotaxis punctatorugosa Blanchard, 1851

Synonyms
- Diplotaxis densicollis Fall, 1909; Diplotaxis excavata LeConte, 1856; Diplotaxis frontalis LeConte, 1856

Species of beetle

Diplotaxis punctatorugosa is a species of scarab beetle in the family Scarabaeidae. It is found in North America.
