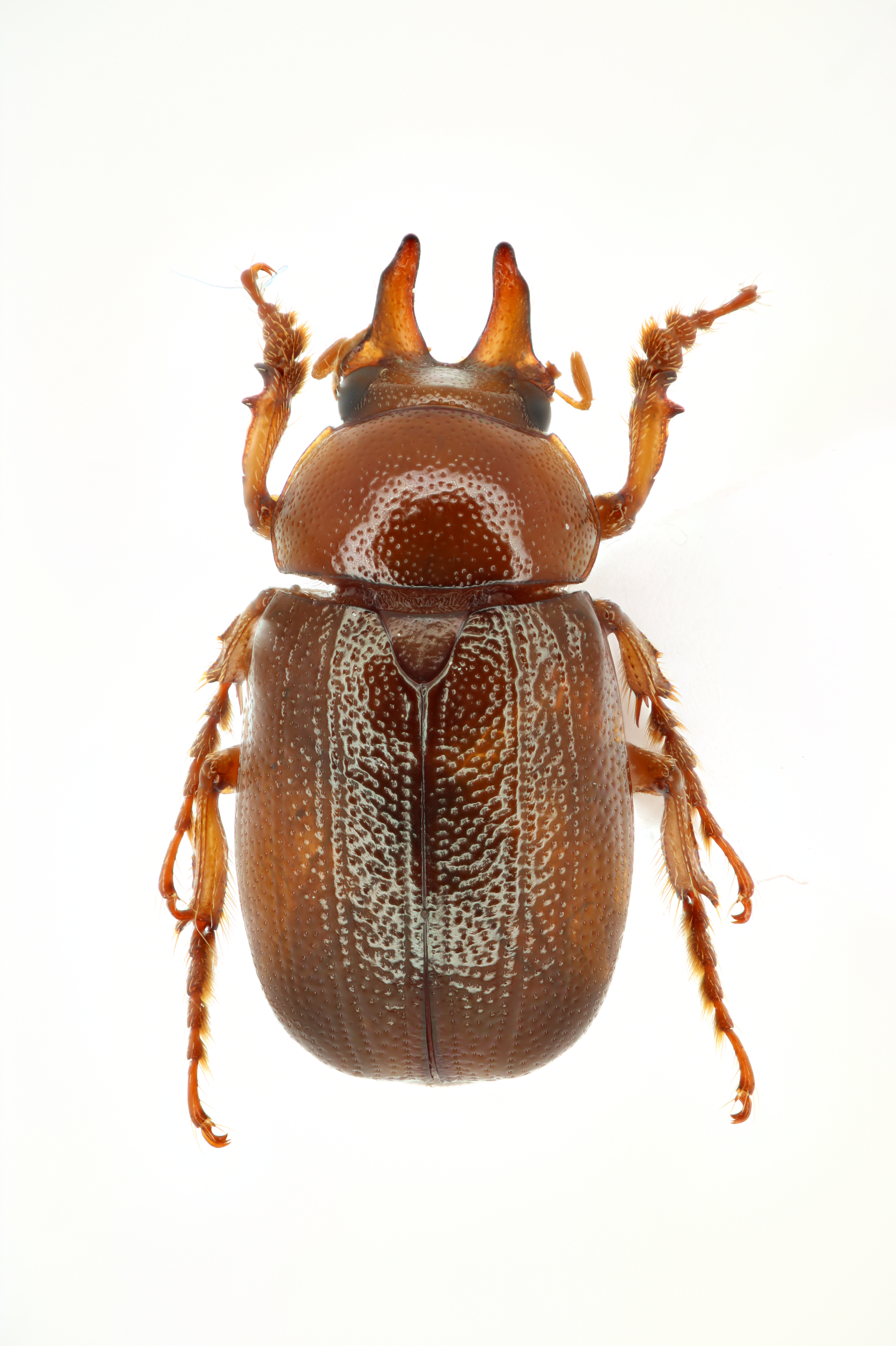

Scientific classification
- Kingdom: Animalia
- Phylum: Arthropoda
- Clade: Pancrustacea
- Class: Insecta
- Order: Coleoptera
- Suborder: Polyphaga
- Infraorder: Scarabaeiformia
- Family: Scarabaeidae
- Subfamily: Melolonthinae
- Tribe: Diplotaxini
- Genus: Ceratogonia; Kolbe, 1899
- Species: C. bicornuta

Binomial name
- Ceratogonia bicornuta (Kolbe, 1899)

Synonyms
- Apogonia bicornuta Kolbe, 1899; Rhinyptia bilaminiceps Benderitter, 1920; Apogonia (Ceratogonia) marshalli Arrow, 1902; Ceratogonia marshalli

= Ceratogonia =

Genus of beetles

Ceratogonia is a genus of beetle of the family Scarabaeidae. It is monotypic, being represented by the single species, Ceratogonia bicornuta, which is found in Malawi, Mozambique, the Democratic Republic of the Congo, Tanzania, Zambia and Zimbabwe.

== Description ==
Adults reach a length of about 5.5–7 mm (0.22–0.28 in) (males) and 5.5–7.5 mm (0.22–0.30 in) (females). They have an ovate, moderately convex body. The whole surface is testaceous, sometimes with the pronotum somewhat darker. The dorsal surface is shiny, while the ventral surface is alutaceous. The setation is pale.
