= Liogenys elegans =

Scientific classification
- Kingdom: Animalia
- Phylum: Arthropoda
- Clade: Pancrustacea
- Class: Insecta
- Order: Coleoptera
- Suborder: Polyphaga
- Infraorder: Scarabaeiformia
- Family: Scarabaeidae
- Genus: Liogenys
- Species: L. elegans

Binomial name
- Liogenys elegans Nonfried, 1891

Synonyms
- Liogenys forsteri Frey, 1975; Liogenys brasiliensis Moser, 1919

Species of beetle

Liogenys elegans is a species of beetle of the family Scarabaeidae. It is found in Argentina, Brazil (Paraná, Rio Grande do Sul, Santa Catarina) and Paraguay.

== Description ==
Adults reach a length of about 11-12 mm. The upper and lower surfaces are dark reddish-brown, with the underside somewhat lighter. The antennae are brown. The upper surface is shiny and glabrous. The pronotum is moderately coarsely, rather densely, and unevenly punctate.
