= Diplotaxis moerens =

Scientific classification
- Kingdom: Animalia
- Phylum: Arthropoda
- Clade: Pancrustacea
- Class: Insecta
- Order: Coleoptera
- Suborder: Polyphaga
- Infraorder: Scarabaeiformia
- Family: Scarabaeidae
- Genus: Diplotaxis
- Species: D. moerens

Binomial name
- Diplotaxis moerens LeConte, 1856

Species of beetle

Diplotaxis moerens is a species of scarab beetle in the family Scarabaeidae. It is found in Central America and North America.

== Subspecies ==
These two subspecies belong to the species Diplotaxis moerens:

- Diplotaxis moerens moerens LeConte, 1856
- Diplotaxis moerens peninsularis Fall, 1909
