= Diplotaxis liberta =

Scientific classification
- Kingdom: Animalia
- Phylum: Arthropoda
- Clade: Pancrustacea
- Class: Insecta
- Order: Coleoptera
- Suborder: Polyphaga
- Infraorder: Scarabaeiformia
- Family: Scarabaeidae
- Genus: Diplotaxis
- Species: D. liberta

Binomial name
- Diplotaxis liberta (Germar, 1824)

Synonyms
- Diplotaxis ebenina Blanchard, 1851; Diplotaxis georgiae Blanchard, 1851; Melolontha moesta Say, 1825

Species of beetle

Diplotaxis liberta is a species of scarab beetle in the family Scarabaeidae. It is found in the Caribbean Sea and North America.
