= Diplotaxis cribulosa =

Scientific classification
- Kingdom: Animalia
- Phylum: Arthropoda
- Clade: Pancrustacea
- Class: Insecta
- Order: Coleoptera
- Suborder: Polyphaga
- Infraorder: Scarabaeiformia
- Family: Scarabaeidae
- Genus: Diplotaxis
- Species: D. cribulosa

Binomial name
- Diplotaxis cribulosa LeConte, 1856

Species of beetle

Diplotaxis cribulosa is a species of scarab beetle in the family Scarabaeidae.

== Subspecies ==
These two subspecies belong to the species Diplotaxis cribulosa:

- Diplotaxis cribulosa cribulosa LeConte, 1856
- Diplotaxis cribulosa sinaloa Vaurie, 1958
