= Metapogonia brunoi =

Scientific classification
- Kingdom: Animalia
- Phylum: Arthropoda
- Clade: Pancrustacea
- Class: Insecta
- Order: Coleoptera
- Suborder: Polyphaga
- Infraorder: Scarabaeiformia
- Family: Scarabaeidae
- Genus: Metapogonia
- Species: M. brunoi

Binomial name
- Metapogonia brunoi (Frey, 1976)

Synonyms
- Apogonia (Metagonia) brunoi Frey, 1976

Species of beetle

Metapogonia brunoi is a species of beetle of the family Scarabaeidae. It is found in Ethiopia.

== Description ==
Adults reach a length of about 6–6.5 mm (0.24–0.26 in). The upper and lower surfaces are glossy brown, with the head and legs somewhat darker. The underside and pygidium have short, appressed setae, while the rest of the body is hairless.
