= Liogenys =

Scientific classification
- Kingdom: Animalia
- Phylum: Arthropoda
- Clade: Pancrustacea
- Class: Insecta
- Order: Coleoptera
- Suborder: Polyphaga
- Infraorder: Scarabaeiformia
- Family: Scarabaeidae
- Subfamily: Melolonthinae
- Tribe: Diplotaxini
- Genus: Liogenys; Guérin-Méneville, 1831

Synonyms
- Homoliogenys Gutiérrez, 1952; Peritryssus Reitter, 1918; Hilarianus Blanchard, 1851; Amphicrania Dejean, 1833

Genus of leaf beetles

Liogenys is a genus of beetles belonging to the family Scarabaeidae.

== Species ==
- Liogenys acuta Cherman, 2019
- Liogenys acutidens Moser, 1919
- Liogenys amazonica Cherman, 2019
- Liogenys angustitarsis Cherman, 2019
- Liogenys bidentata Burmeister, 1855
- Liogenys bidenticeps Moser, 1919
- Liogenys bilobata Frey, 1969
- Liogenys boliviensis Moser, 1919
- Liogenys brachyclypeata Cherman, Basílio, Mise, Frisch, Smith & Almeida, 2020
- Liogenys calcarata Frey, 1970
- Liogenys cartwrighti Frey, 1969
- Liogenys cavifrons Cherman, 2017
- Liogenys clinocarinata Cherman, 2019
- Liogenys clipeosetosa Cherman, 2021
- Liogenys concolor Blanchard, 1851
- Liogenys corumbana Moser, 1921
- Liogenys crassopunctata Cherman, 2019
- Liogenys cribricollis Moser, 1921
- Liogenys densata Frey, 1969
- Liogenys denticeps Blanchard, 1851
- Liogenys diodon Burmeister, 1855
- Liogenys elegans Nonfried, 1891
- Liogenys elguetai Cherman & Smith, 2025
- Liogenys ferrugata (Mannerheim, 1828)
- Liogenys flaveola Moser, 1924
- Liogenys flavida Moser, 1918
- Liogenys forcipata Frey, 1970
- Liogenys foveata Cherman, 2021
- Liogenys freyi Cherman, 2017
- Liogenys fusca Blanchard, 1851
- Liogenys genieri Smith & Cherman, 2021
- Liogenys granadina Cherman, 2021
- Liogenys grandis Philippi, 1864
- Liogenys grossi Cherman, 2017
- Liogenys hirsuta Cherman, 2019
- Liogenys hirta Gutiérrez, 1951
- Liogenys hirtipennis Frey, 1969
- Liogenys isotarsis Cherman, 2021
- Liogenys kuntzeni Moser, 1921
- Liogenys laminiceps Moser, 1919
- Liogenys latitarsis Moser, 1918
- Liogenys latoemarginata Cherman, 2019
- Liogenys leechi Frey, 1967
- Liogenys leviscutata Cherman, 2019
- Liogenys lucialmeidae Cherman, 2020
- Liogenys macropelma Bates, 1887
- Liogenys martinezi Cherman, 2020
- Liogenys maxillaricuspis Cherman, 2020
- Liogenys mendozana Moser, 1918
- Liogenys minuta Moser, 1924
- Liogenys morio Burmeister, 1855
- Liogenys moroni Cherman, 2015
- Liogenys moseri Frey, 1969
- Liogenys neoforcipata Cherman, 2021
- Liogenys niger (Blanchard, 1851)
- Liogenys nigrofusca Moser, 1918
- Liogenys obscura Blanchard, 1851
- Liogenys opacicollis Fairmaire, 1892
- Liogenys opacipennis Frey, 1969
- Liogenys ornativentris Cherman, 2019
- Liogenys pallens Blanchard, 1851
- Liogenys pallidicornis Blanchard, 1851
- Liogenys palpalis (Eschscholtz, 1822)
- Liogenys parallela Frey, 1965
- Liogenys parva Blanchard, 1851
- Liogenys piauiensis Cherman, 2017
- Liogenys pilosipennis Moser, 1918
- Liogenys pruinosa Cherman, 2019
- Liogenys pseudosanctaecrucis Cherman, 2017
- Liogenys pseudospiniventris Cherman, 2017
- Liogenys punctaticollis (Blanchard, 1851)
- Liogenys quadrata Cherman, 2019
- Liogenys quadridens (Fabricius, 1798)
- Liogenys quadridentata Blanchard, 1851
- Liogenys rectangula Frey, 1969
- Liogenys rodriguesi Cherman, 2019
- Liogenys rotundicollis Cherman, 2017
- Liogenys rufocastanea Moser, 1918
- Liogenys rufoflava Moser, 1918
- Liogenys rugosicollis Frey, 1969
- Liogenys sanctaecrucis Blanchard, 1851
- Liogenys schneiderae Cherman, 2021
- Liogenys sinuaticeps Moser, 1918
- Liogenys spiniventris Moser, 1918
- Liogenys sulcoventris Cherman, 2017
- Liogenys susanalbertorum Cherman, 2019
- Liogenys suturalis (Blanchard, 1851)
- Liogenys tarsalis Moser, 1921
- Liogenys testaceipennis Moser, 1918
- Liogenys tibialis Moser, 1918
- Liogenys truncata Cherman, 2021
- Liogenys unicolor Evans, 2003
- Liogenys variabilis Cherman, 2019
- Liogenys vazdemelloi Cherman, 2019
- Liogenys vicina Frey, 1969
- Liogenys wagenknechti Gutiérrez, 1951
- Liogenys xanthocera Harold, 1869
- Liogenys zischkai Frey, 1965
