= Diplotaxis frondicola =

Scientific classification
- Kingdom: Animalia
- Phylum: Arthropoda
- Clade: Pancrustacea
- Class: Insecta
- Order: Coleoptera
- Suborder: Polyphaga
- Infraorder: Scarabaeiformia
- Family: Scarabaeidae
- Genus: Diplotaxis
- Species: D. frondicola

Binomial name
- Diplotaxis frondicola (Say, 1825)

Synonyms
- Diplotaxis testacea Burmeister, 1855

Species of beetle

Diplotaxis frondicola is a species of May beetle or junebug in the family Scarabaeidae. It is found in North America.
