= Metapogonia =

Scientific classification
- Kingdom: Animalia
- Phylum: Arthropoda
- Clade: Pancrustacea
- Class: Insecta
- Order: Coleoptera
- Suborder: Polyphaga
- Infraorder: Scarabaeiformia
- Family: Scarabaeidae
- Subfamily: Melolonthinae
- Tribe: Diplotaxini
- Genus: Metapogonia; Lacroix, 2008

Synonyms
- Bezdekia Özdikmen & Demir, 2008; Apogonia (Metagonia) Kolbe, 1899

Genus of leaf beetles

Metapogonia is a genus of beetles belonging to the family Scarabaeidae.

== Species ==
- Metapogonia bayeri (Moser, 1917)
- Metapogonia brunoi (Frey, 1976)
- Metapogonia elgonensis (Burgeon, 1945)
- Metapogonia kaszabi (Frey, 1974)
- Metapogonia mediocris (Kolbe, 1891)
- Metapogonia parvula (Moser, 1917)
- Metapogonia platypus (Kolbe, 1899)
- Metapogonia platypyge (Kolbe, 1899)
- Metapogonia pusilla (Laporte, 1840)
- Metapogonia snizeki Bezděk, 2020
- Metapogonia zambesiana (Moser, 1917)
