= Diplotaxis bidentata =

Scientific classification
- Kingdom: Animalia
- Phylum: Arthropoda
- Clade: Pancrustacea
- Class: Insecta
- Order: Coleoptera
- Suborder: Polyphaga
- Infraorder: Scarabaeiformia
- Family: Scarabaeidae
- Genus: Diplotaxis
- Species: D. bidentata

Binomial name
- Diplotaxis bidentata LeConte, 1856

Species of beetle

Diplotaxis bidentata is a species of scarab beetle in the family Scarabaeidae. It is found in North America.
