= Metapogonia zambesiana =

Scientific classification
- Kingdom: Animalia
- Phylum: Arthropoda
- Clade: Pancrustacea
- Class: Insecta
- Order: Coleoptera
- Suborder: Polyphaga
- Infraorder: Scarabaeiformia
- Family: Scarabaeidae
- Genus: Metapogonia
- Species: M. zambesiana

Binomial name
- Metapogonia zambesiana (Moser, 1917)

Synonyms
- Metagonia zambesiana Moser, 1917

Species of beetle

Metapogonia zambesiana is a species of beetle of the family Scarabaeidae. It is found in Mozambique.

== Description ==
Adults reach a length of about 5.5 mm. They are very similar to Metapogonia pusilla, with the same colouration and size. The head is quite densely punctate. The pronotum shows denser punctation than in M. pusilla. The punctation on the elytra is stronger and somewhat denser than in M. pusilla and the ribs are less prominent. The underside is finely sculpted in a leathery texture and is extensive in the middle, while the sides are more densely covered with coarse punctures with light, scale-like setae.
