= Brachypholis =

Scientific classification
- Missing taxonomy template (fix): Brachypholis

Genus of leaf beetles

Brachypholis is a genus of beetles belonging to the family Scarabaeidae.

== Species ==
- Brachypholis rothschildi Brenske, 1898
- Brachypholis sjoestedti Brenske, 1903
