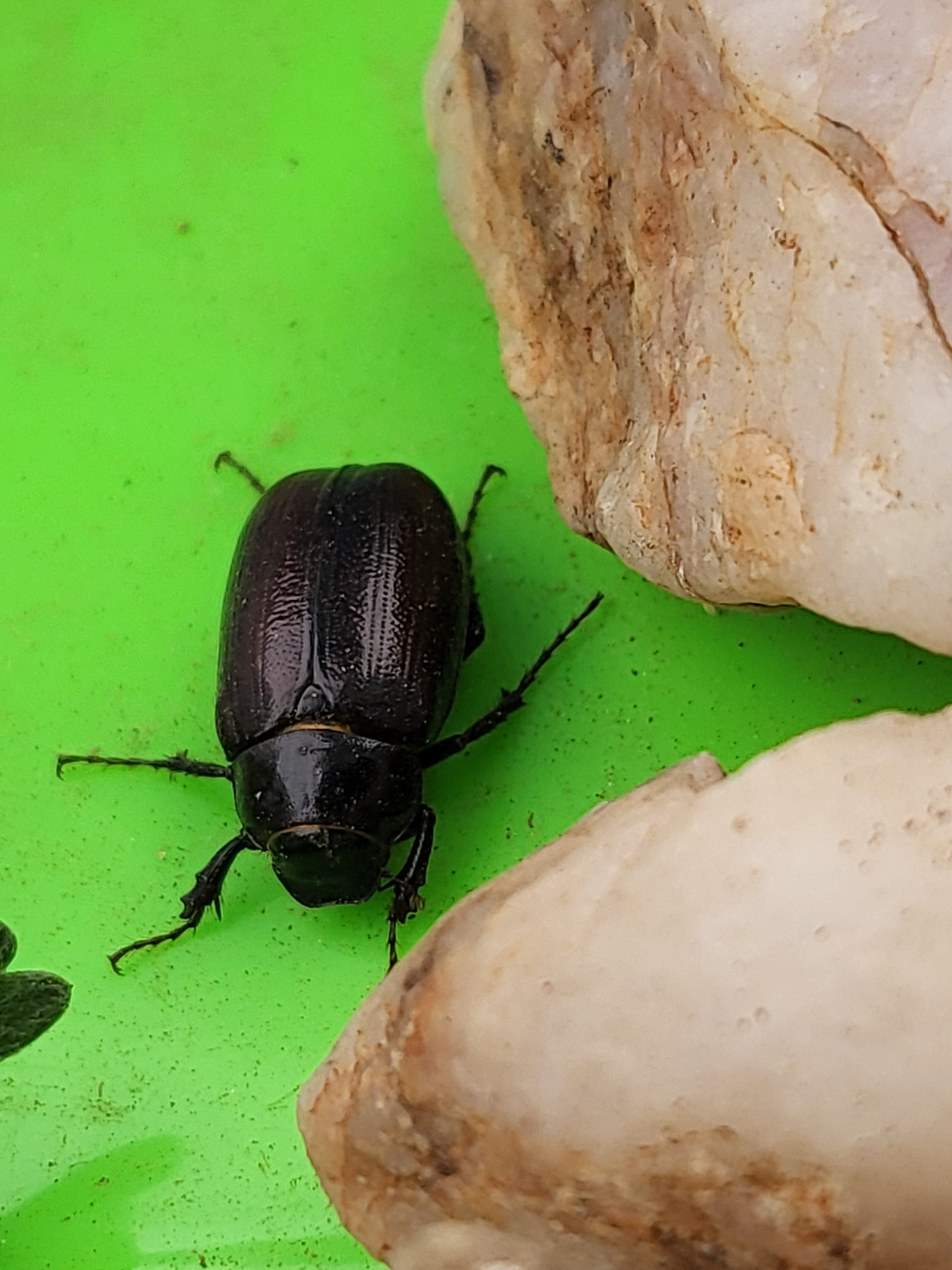

Scientific classification
- Kingdom: Animalia
- Phylum: Arthropoda
- Clade: Pancrustacea
- Class: Insecta
- Order: Coleoptera
- Suborder: Polyphaga
- Infraorder: Scarabaeiformia
- Family: Scarabaeidae
- Subfamily: Melolonthinae
- Tribe: Diplotaxini
- Genus: Diplotaxis; Kirby, 1837

Species
- List of Diplotaxis species

= Diplotaxis (beetle) =

Genus of beetles

Diplotaxis is a large genus of scarab beetles in the subfamily Melolonthinae. There are at least 250 described species in the genus Diplotaxis distributed over North and Central America.

== See also ==
- List of Diplotaxis species
