= Enamillus rectus =

Scientific classification
- Kingdom: Animalia
- Phylum: Arthropoda
- Clade: Pancrustacea
- Class: Insecta
- Order: Coleoptera
- Suborder: Polyphaga
- Infraorder: Scarabaeiformia
- Family: Scarabaeidae
- Genus: Enamillus
- Species: E. rectus

Binomial name
- Enamillus rectus Allsopp, 1989

Species of beetle

Enamillus rectus is a species of beetle of the family Scarabaeidae. It is found in Australia (Western Australia).

== Description ==
Adults reach a length of about 11.5–12.9 mm (0.45–0.51 in). The head and pygidium are black and shiny and the pronotum and elytra are black to blackish-brown and slightly pruinose. The ventral surface is black, the antennae blackish-brown and the legs brown. They have golden setae.

== Etymology ==
The species name refers to the straight anterior margin of the labrum compared with that of the closely related Enamillus clevensis.
