= Metascelis =

Scientific classification
- Kingdom: Animalia
- Phylum: Arthropoda
- Clade: Pancrustacea
- Class: Insecta
- Order: Coleoptera
- Suborder: Polyphaga
- Infraorder: Scarabaeiformia
- Family: Scarabaeidae
- Subfamily: Melolonthinae
- Tribe: Systellopini
- Genus: Metascelis; Westwood, 1842
- Species: M. flexilis

Binomial name
- Metascelis flexilis Westwood, 1842

Genus of beetles

Metascelis is a genus of beetle of the family Scarabaeidae. It is monotypic, being represented by the single species, Metascelis flexilis, which is thought to originate from the Nepal-India border area.

== Taxonomy ==
Westwood described this species in 1842. The type specimen was in the collection of the Linnaean Society of London. It is no longer in that collection. A specimen labelled as M. flexilis is in the collection of the ZMHU. Sharp treated M. flexilis as a synonym of Chilodiplus albertisii in 1877. But Allsopp disputed this in his 1989 revision of the Systellopini tribe. He even concluded that M. flexilis does not belong in this tribe, although it has not been formally reclassified yet.
