= Systellopini =

Scientific classification
- Kingdom: Animalia
- Phylum: Arthropoda
- Clade: Pancrustacea
- Class: Insecta
- Order: Coleoptera
- Suborder: Polyphaga
- Infraorder: Scarabaeiformia
- Family: Scarabaeidae
- Subfamily: Melolonthinae
- Tribe: Systellopini; Dalla Torre, 1912

Synonyms
- Systellopidae Nonfried, 1892; Systellopides Sharp, 1877

Tribe of beetles

Systellopini is a tribe of scarab beetles in the family Scarabaeidae.

== Genera ==
The following genera are recognised in the tribe Systellopini:

- Chilodiplus Sharp, 1877
- Enamillus Sharp, 1877
- Liomenochilus Hutchinson & Allsopp, 2022
- Metascelis Westwood, 1842
- Prochelyna Erichson, 1847
- Sarothromerus Blackburn, 1907
- Sphyrocallus Sharp, 1877
- Systellopus Sharp, 1877
