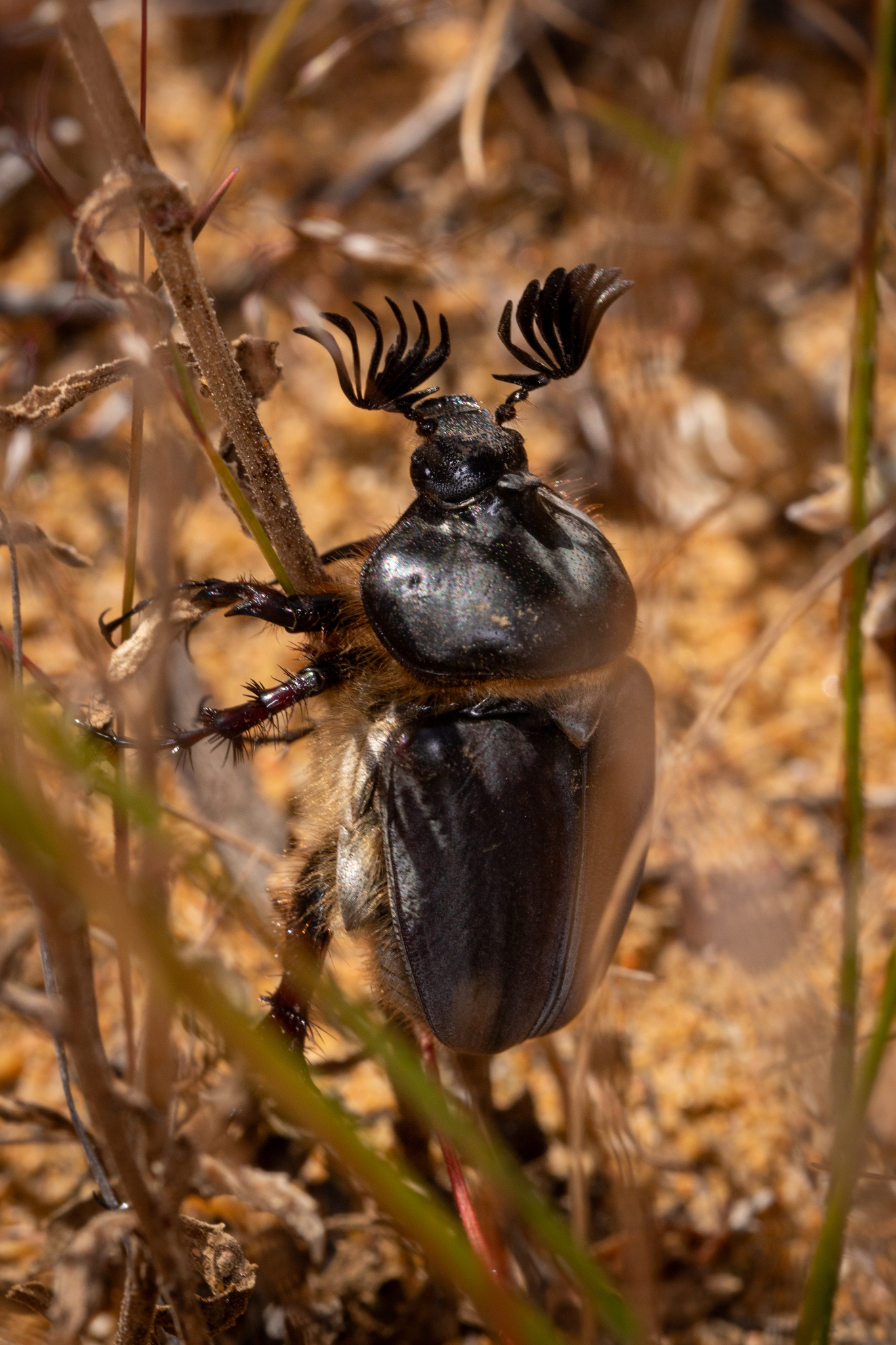

Scientific classification
- Kingdom: Animalia
- Phylum: Arthropoda
- Clade: Pancrustacea
- Class: Insecta
- Order: Coleoptera
- Suborder: Polyphaga
- Infraorder: Scarabaeiformia
- Family: Scarabaeidae
- Genus: Prochelyna
- Species: P. heterodoxa

Binomial name
- Prochelyna heterodoxa Burmeister, 1855

Synonyms
- Atholerus obscurus Sharp, 1877

= Prochelyna heterodoxa =

Species of beetle

Prochelyna heterodoxa is a species of beetle of the family Scarabaeidae. It is found in Australia (Western Australia).

== Description ==
Adults reach a length of about 11.6–16.6 mm (0.46–0.65 in) for males and about 15.8–20.2 mm (0.62–0.80 in) for females. The legs and antennae are brown and the clypeus and ventral surface are dark brownish-black to black. The frons and pronotum are piceous and sometimes pruinose. The elytra are dark brownish-black and pruinose and the pygidium is black and shining. The setae on the ventral surface are yellow.
