= Sarothromerus aranda =

Scientific classification
- Kingdom: Animalia
- Phylum: Arthropoda
- Clade: Pancrustacea
- Class: Insecta
- Order: Coleoptera
- Suborder: Polyphaga
- Infraorder: Scarabaeiformia
- Family: Scarabaeidae
- Genus: Sarothromerus
- Species: S. aranda

Binomial name
- Sarothromerus aranda Allsopp, 1989

Species of beetle

Sarothromerus aranda is a species of beetle of the family Scarabaeidae. It is found in Australia (Northern Territory).

== Description ==
Adults reach a length of about 12.5–13.5 mm (0.49–0.53 in) for males and about 19 mm (0.75 in) for females. The head is dark brown anteriorly and black posteriorly and the pronotum is brown. The scutellum is dark brown and the elytra are brown with the lateral margin and posterior area dark brown to black. The antennae are and ventral surface are yellowish-brown and the legs are dark brown. It is covered with yellow setae.

== Etymology ==
The species name is derived from the name of the predominant tribe of Aboriginal people living at Hermannsburg, where the species was discovered.
