= Prochelyna houstoni =

Scientific classification
- Kingdom: Animalia
- Phylum: Arthropoda
- Clade: Pancrustacea
- Class: Insecta
- Order: Coleoptera
- Suborder: Polyphaga
- Infraorder: Scarabaeiformia
- Family: Scarabaeidae
- Genus: Prochelyna
- Species: P. houstoni

Binomial name
- Prochelyna houstoni Allsopp, 1989

Species of beetle

Prochelyna houstoni is a species of beetle of the family Scarabaeidae. It is found in Australia (Western Australia).

== Description ==
Adults reach a length of about 15.8–16.4 mm (0.62–0.65 in). The clypeus is black with brown anterior and lateral margins. The rest of the head, as well as the pronotum, elytra, ventral surface and pygidium are black, with both the pronotum and elytra pruinose. The legs are brown and the antennae are brown with a dark brown to black club. They have golden setae.

== Etymology ==
The species is named after its collector, Terry Houston.
