= Sarothromerus sharpi =

Scientific classification
- Kingdom: Animalia
- Phylum: Arthropoda
- Clade: Pancrustacea
- Class: Insecta
- Order: Coleoptera
- Suborder: Polyphaga
- Infraorder: Scarabaeiformia
- Family: Scarabaeidae
- Genus: Sarothromerus
- Species: S. sharpi

Binomial name
- Sarothromerus sharpi (Blackburn, 1905)

Synonyms
- Enamillus sharpi Blackburn, 1905

Species of beetle

Sarothromerus sharpi is a species of beetle of the family Scarabaeidae. It is found in Australia (Western Australia).

== Description ==
Adults reach a length of about 11.2–12 mm (0.44–0.47 in). The clypeus is brownish yellow, while the frons and elytra are brown to black and the pronotum is testaceous except for some brown to black markings. The ventral surface and pygidium are testaceous, with yellow setae.
