= Chilodiplus galiwinku =

Scientific classification
- Kingdom: Animalia
- Phylum: Arthropoda
- Clade: Pancrustacea
- Class: Insecta
- Order: Coleoptera
- Suborder: Polyphaga
- Infraorder: Scarabaeiformia
- Family: Scarabaeidae
- Genus: Chilodiplus
- Species: C. galiwinku

Binomial name
- Chilodiplus galiwinku Allsopp, 1993

Species of beetle

Chilodiplus galiwinku is a species of beetle of the family Scarabaeidae. It is found in Australia (Northern Territory).

== Description ==
Adults reach a length of about 14.4–14.7 mm (0.57–0.58 in). The clypeus is yellowish-brown with a black posterior margin. The frons is black, while the pronotum is black in the middle, with this black colour extending towards the yellowish sides. The scutellum is black and the elytra are yellowish with black margins. The pygidium, ventral surface and legs are yellowish-brown.

== Etymology ==
The species name refers to the contemporary name for Elcho Island.
