= Chilodiplus weiri =

Scientific classification
- Kingdom: Animalia
- Phylum: Arthropoda
- Clade: Pancrustacea
- Class: Insecta
- Order: Coleoptera
- Suborder: Polyphaga
- Infraorder: Scarabaeiformia
- Family: Scarabaeidae
- Genus: Chilodiplus
- Species: C. weiri

Binomial name
- Chilodiplus weiri Allsopp, 1993

Species of beetle

Chilodiplus weiri is a species of beetle of the family Scarabaeidae. It is found in Australia (Queensland).

== Description ==
Adults reach a length of about 12.2 mm (0.48 in). The clypeus is brown and the frons is dark brown anteriorly and black posteriorly. The pronotum has a brown-yellow centre surrounded by black. The scutellum is black and the elytra are brown-yellow with black patches. The pygidium, ventral surface and legs are light brown.

== Etymology ==
The species is named for Tom Weir, who send the specimens of this species to the author.
