= Prochelyna velutina =

Scientific classification
- Kingdom: Animalia
- Phylum: Arthropoda
- Clade: Pancrustacea
- Class: Insecta
- Order: Coleoptera
- Suborder: Polyphaga
- Infraorder: Scarabaeiformia
- Family: Scarabaeidae
- Genus: Prochelyna
- Species: P. velutina

Binomial name
- Prochelyna velutina (Sharp, 1877)

Synonyms
- Tosotarsus velutinus Sharp, 1877

Species of beetle

Prochelyna velutina is a species of beetle of the family Scarabaeidae. It is found in Australia (Western Australia).

== Description ==
Adults reach a length of about 11.6–14.2 mm (0.46–0.56 in). The clypeus and pygidium are black, while the rest of the dorsal surface is pitchy black with the edges tinged brown. The ventral surface is blackish-brown, the legs are brown and the antennae are brown with a black club. They have golden setae.
