= Sarothromerus niger =

Scientific classification
- Kingdom: Animalia
- Phylum: Arthropoda
- Clade: Pancrustacea
- Class: Insecta
- Order: Coleoptera
- Suborder: Polyphaga
- Infraorder: Scarabaeiformia
- Family: Scarabaeidae
- Genus: Sarothromerus
- Species: S. niger

Binomial name
- Sarothromerus niger Allsopp, 1989

Species of beetle

Sarothromerus niger is a species of beetle of the family Scarabaeidae. It is found in Australia (Western Australia).

== Description ==
Adults reach a length of about 10.3 mm (0.41 in). The dorsal surface is black and pruinose, especially on the elytra. The ventral surface is dark brown to black and the antennae are light brown.

== Etymology ==
The species name refers to the colour of the dorsal surface.
