= Enamillus bicolor =

Scientific classification
- Kingdom: Animalia
- Phylum: Arthropoda
- Clade: Pancrustacea
- Class: Insecta
- Order: Coleoptera
- Suborder: Polyphaga
- Infraorder: Scarabaeiformia
- Family: Scarabaeidae
- Genus: Enamillus
- Species: E. bicolor

Binomial name
- Enamillus bicolor (Blackburn, 1905)

Synonyms
- Sphyrocallus bicolor Blackburn, 1905

Species of beetle

Enamillus bicolor is a species of beetle of the family Scarabaeidae. It is found in Australia (Western Australia, South Australia).

== Description ==
Adults reach a length of about 12.6–14.4 mm (0.50–0.57 in) for males and about 14.2 mm (0.56 in) for females. The clypeus and the anterior portion of the frons are red-brown, while the posterior portion of the frons is black. The pronotum dull and earthy brown, while the elytra are reddish-brown to black. The ventral surface is dark yellowish-brown and the pygidium brown. They have yellow setae.
