= Sphyrocallus brunneus =

Scientific classification
- Kingdom: Animalia
- Phylum: Arthropoda
- Clade: Pancrustacea
- Class: Insecta
- Order: Coleoptera
- Suborder: Polyphaga
- Infraorder: Scarabaeiformia
- Family: Scarabaeidae
- Genus: Sphyrocallus
- Species: S. brunneus

Binomial name
- Sphyrocallus brunneus Sharp, 1877

Species of beetle

Sphyrocallus brunneus is a species of beetle of the family Scarabaeidae. It is found in Australia (Western Australia, Northern Territory).

== Description ==
Adults reach a length of about 13.9–15.3 mm (0.55–0.60 in). The clypeus, frons, pronotum, elytra and pygidium are dark brown, while the rest of the head is black. The scutellum is brown or black and the antennae and ventral surface are brown.
