= Enamillus striatus =

Scientific classification
- Kingdom: Animalia
- Phylum: Arthropoda
- Clade: Pancrustacea
- Class: Insecta
- Order: Coleoptera
- Suborder: Polyphaga
- Infraorder: Scarabaeiformia
- Family: Scarabaeidae
- Genus: Enamillus
- Species: E. striatus

Binomial name
- Enamillus striatus Sharp, 1877

Species of beetle

Enamillus striatus is a species of beetle of the family Scarabaeidae. It is found in Australia (Western Australia).

== Description ==
Adults reach a length of about 9.2–11.4 mm (0.36–0.45 in). The head is black, with the antennae brown with a dark brown to black club. The pronotum, scutellum and elytra are piceous, while the ventral surface is mostly black. The legs are dark brown to black. They have golden setae.
