= Sphyrocallus desertus =

Scientific classification
- Kingdom: Animalia
- Phylum: Arthropoda
- Clade: Pancrustacea
- Class: Insecta
- Order: Coleoptera
- Suborder: Polyphaga
- Infraorder: Scarabaeiformia
- Family: Scarabaeidae
- Genus: Sphyrocallus
- Species: S. desertus

Binomial name
- Sphyrocallus desertus Allsopp, 1989

Species of beetle

Sphyrocallus desertus is a species of beetle of the family Scarabaeidae. It is found in Australia (South Australia).

== Description ==
Adults reach a length of about 11.4–13.5 mm (0.45–0.53 in). The dorsal surface of the head and elytra is piceous, while the pronotum, scutellum, tibiae and tarsi are dark brown. The ventral surface is brown and the antennae are pale brown.

== Life history ==
Specimens have been collected at night in Acacia and cane grass vegetation at the base of sand dunes.

== Etymology ==
The species name refers to the arid nature of the collection localities.
