= Systellopus =

Scientific classification
- Kingdom: Animalia
- Phylum: Arthropoda
- Clade: Pancrustacea
- Class: Insecta
- Order: Coleoptera
- Suborder: Polyphaga
- Infraorder: Scarabaeiformia
- Family: Scarabaeidae
- Subfamily: Melolonthinae
- Tribe: Systellopini
- Genus: Systellopus; Sharp, 1877
- Species: S. obtusus

Binomial name
- Systellopus obtusus Sharp, 1877

Synonyms
- Systellopus ater Lea, 1919; Systellopus validus Sharp, 1877

Genus of beetles

Systellopus is a genus of beetle of the family Scarabaeidae. It is monotypic, being represented by the single species, Systellopus obtusus, which is found in Australia (Western Australia).

== Description ==
Adults reach a length of about 14.6–25.7 mm (0.57–1.01 in) for males and about 27 mm (1.1 in) for females. The dorsal surface and pygidium are black and the posterior half of the pronotum and elytra are pruinose. The ventral surface is dark brownish-black with black setae.
