= Liomenochilus =

Scientific classification
- Kingdom: Animalia
- Phylum: Arthropoda
- Clade: Pancrustacea
- Class: Insecta
- Order: Coleoptera
- Suborder: Polyphaga
- Infraorder: Scarabaeiformia
- Family: Scarabaeidae
- Subfamily: Melolonthinae
- Tribe: Systellopini
- Genus: Liomenochilus; Hutchinson & Allsopp, 2022
- Species: L. ongi

Binomial name
- Liomenochilus ongi Hutchinson & Allsopp, 2022

Genus of beetles

Liomenochilus is a genus of beetle of the family Scarabaeidae. It is monotypic, being represented by the single species, Liomenochilus ongi, which is found in Australia (Western Australia).

== Description ==
Adults reach a length of about 11.6 mm (0.46 in). The head, clypeus and frons are brownish-yellow and the antennae are brown. The pronotum is yellow with a black spot. The scutellum is black and the elytra are yellowish-brown with black margins.

== Etymology ==
The species is named in honour of its collector, S. Ong.
