= Enamillus pilicollis =

Scientific classification
- Kingdom: Animalia
- Phylum: Arthropoda
- Clade: Pancrustacea
- Class: Insecta
- Order: Coleoptera
- Suborder: Polyphaga
- Infraorder: Scarabaeiformia
- Family: Scarabaeidae
- Genus: Enamillus
- Species: E. pilicollis

Binomial name
- Enamillus pilicollis (Sharp, 1877)

Synonyms
- Trichelasmus pilicollis Sharp, 1877

Species of beetle

Enamillus pilicollis is a species of beetle of the family Scarabaeidae. It is found in Australia (Western Australia).

== Description ==
Adults reach a length of about 11.4–11.6 mm (0.45–0.46 in). The dorsal and ventral surfaces are dark piceous to black and the antennae are brown with a dark brown to black club. The legs are dark brown to black. They have golden yellow setae.
