= Enamillus mauricei =

Scientific classification
- Kingdom: Animalia
- Phylum: Arthropoda
- Clade: Pancrustacea
- Class: Insecta
- Order: Coleoptera
- Suborder: Polyphaga
- Infraorder: Scarabaeiformia
- Family: Scarabaeidae
- Genus: Enamillus
- Species: E. mauricei

Binomial name
- Enamillus mauricei Blackburn, 1907

Species of beetle

Enamillus mauricei is a species of beetle of the family Scarabaeidae. It is found in Australia (South Australia).

== Description ==
Adults reach a length of about 13.4–16 mm (0.53–0.63 in). The head and pygidium are shiny black, while the pronotum, scutellum and posterior part of the elytra are black and somewhat pruinose. The anterior area of the elytra is orange-red. The ventral surface is black to very dark brown and the antennae and legs are dark brown to black. They have golden setae.
