= Enamillus septus =

Scientific classification
- Kingdom: Animalia
- Phylum: Arthropoda
- Clade: Pancrustacea
- Class: Insecta
- Order: Coleoptera
- Suborder: Polyphaga
- Infraorder: Scarabaeiformia
- Family: Scarabaeidae
- Genus: Enamillus
- Species: E. septus

Binomial name
- Enamillus septus Allsopp, 1989

Species of beetle

Enamillus septus is a species of beetle of the family Scarabaeidae. It is found in Australia (Western Australia).

== Description ==
Adults reach a length of about 11.7 mm (0.46 in). The labrum is dark brown, while the rest of the head, as well as the pronotum, scutellum, posterior two-thirds of the elytra, pygidium and ventral thorax are black. The remaining surface of the elytra is orange. The legs are dark red-brown and the antennae are yellow with a dark brown club. They have yellow setae.

== Etymology ==
The species name refers to the 7-segmented antennal club.
