= Prochelyna =

Scientific classification
- Kingdom: Animalia
- Phylum: Arthropoda
- Clade: Pancrustacea
- Class: Insecta
- Order: Coleoptera
- Suborder: Polyphaga
- Infraorder: Scarabaeiformia
- Family: Scarabaeidae
- Subfamily: Melolonthinae
- Tribe: Systellopini
- Genus: Prochelyna; Erichson, 1847

Synonyms
- Atholerus Sharp, 1877; Tosotarsus Sharp, 1877

Genus of leaf beetles

Prochelyna is a genus of beetles belonging to the family Scarabaeidae.

== Species ==
- Prochelyna heterodoxa Burmeister, 1855
- Prochelyna houstoni Allsopp, 1989
- Prochelyna velutina (Sharp, 1877)
