= Sarothromerus =

Scientific classification
- Kingdom: Animalia
- Phylum: Arthropoda
- Clade: Pancrustacea
- Class: Insecta
- Order: Coleoptera
- Suborder: Polyphaga
- Infraorder: Scarabaeiformia
- Family: Scarabaeidae
- Subfamily: Melolonthinae
- Tribe: Systellopini
- Genus: Sarothromerus; Blackburn, 1907

Genus of leaf beetles

Sarothromerus is a genus of beetles belonging to the family Scarabaeidae.

== Species ==
- Sarothromerus aranda Allsopp, 1989
- Sarothromerus niger Allsopp, 1989
- Sarothromerus sharpi (Blackburn, 1905)
