= Chilodiplus =

Scientific classification
- Kingdom: Animalia
- Phylum: Arthropoda
- Clade: Pancrustacea
- Class: Insecta
- Order: Coleoptera
- Suborder: Polyphaga
- Infraorder: Scarabaeiformia
- Family: Scarabaeidae
- Subfamily: Melolonthinae
- Tribe: Systellopini
- Genus: Chilodiplus; Sharp, 1877

Genus of leaf beetles

Chilodiplus is a genus of beetles belonging to the family Scarabaeidae.

== Species ==
- Chilodiplus albertisii Sharp, 1877
- Chilodiplus galiwinku Allsopp, 1993
- Chilodiplus weiri Allsopp, 1993
- Chilodiplus yadhaykenu Allsopp, 1993
