= Enamillus =

Scientific classification
- Kingdom: Animalia
- Phylum: Arthropoda
- Clade: Pancrustacea
- Class: Insecta
- Order: Coleoptera
- Suborder: Polyphaga
- Infraorder: Scarabaeiformia
- Family: Scarabaeidae
- Subfamily: Melolonthinae
- Tribe: Systellopini
- Genus: Enamillus; Sharp, 1877

Synonyms
- Trichelasmus Sharp, 1877

Genus of leaf beetles

Enamillus is a genus of beetles belonging to the family Scarabaeidae.

== Species ==
- Enamillus basalis (Blackburn, 1907)
- Enamillus bicolor (Blackburn, 1905)
- Enamillus clevensis Allsopp, 1989
- Enamillus mauricei Blackburn, 1907
- Enamillus pilicollis (Sharp, 1877)
- Enamillus rectus Allsopp, 1989
- Enamillus septus Allsopp, 1989
- Enamillus striatus Sharp, 1877
