= Sphyrocallus lloydi =

Scientific classification
- Kingdom: Animalia
- Phylum: Arthropoda
- Clade: Pancrustacea
- Class: Insecta
- Order: Coleoptera
- Suborder: Polyphaga
- Infraorder: Scarabaeiformia
- Family: Scarabaeidae
- Genus: Sphyrocallus
- Species: S. lloydi

Binomial name
- Sphyrocallus lloydi Allsopp, 1989

Species of beetle

Sphyrocallus lloydi is a species of beetle of the family Scarabaeidae. It is found in Australia (Northern Territory).

== Description ==
Adults reach a length of about 12.1–12.5 mm (0.48–0.49 in). The dorsal and ventral surfaces are black, while the legs are dark brown and the antennae brown.

== Etymology ==
The species is named after one of its collectors, Richard Lloyd.
