= Chilodiplus yadhaykenu =

Scientific classification
- Kingdom: Animalia
- Phylum: Arthropoda
- Clade: Pancrustacea
- Class: Insecta
- Order: Coleoptera
- Suborder: Polyphaga
- Infraorder: Scarabaeiformia
- Family: Scarabaeidae
- Genus: Chilodiplus
- Species: C. yadhaykenu

Binomial name
- Chilodiplus yadhaykenu Allsopp, 1993

Species of beetle

Chilodiplus yadhaykenu is a species of beetle of the family Scarabaeidae. It is found in Australia (Queensland).

== Description ==
Adults reach a length of about 16 mm (0.63 in). The clypeus and frons are brown and the pronotum may have an orange median longitudinal line and an orange median transverse line. The disk is brown and the edges are yellow with a brown patch in the middle. The scutellum is brown and the elytra are yellowish-brown with brown spots. The pygidium and legs are light brown and the ventral surface is light brown.

== Etymology ==
The species name is derived from the name of the Aboriginal language from northern Cape York Peninsula.
