= Enamillus basalis =

Scientific classification
- Kingdom: Animalia
- Phylum: Arthropoda
- Clade: Pancrustacea
- Class: Insecta
- Order: Coleoptera
- Suborder: Polyphaga
- Infraorder: Scarabaeiformia
- Family: Scarabaeidae
- Genus: Enamillus
- Species: E. basalis

Binomial name
- Enamillus basalis (Blackburn, 1907)

Synonyms
- Trichelasmus basalis Blackburn, 1907

Species of beetle

Enamillus basalis is a species of beetle of the family Scarabaeidae. It is found in Australia (Western Australia).

== Description ==
Adults reach a length of about 12.8–13.4 mm (0.50–0.53 in). The clypeus is dark brown, while the frons, pronotum, posterior two-thirds of the elytra are piceous and pruinose. The rest of the surface of the elytra is orange. The ventral surface and pygidium are piceous, the legs dark brown and the antennae are brownish-yellow with a dark yellowish-brown club.
