= Chilodiplus albertisii =

Scientific classification
- Kingdom: Animalia
- Phylum: Arthropoda
- Clade: Pancrustacea
- Class: Insecta
- Order: Coleoptera
- Suborder: Polyphaga
- Infraorder: Scarabaeiformia
- Family: Scarabaeidae
- Genus: Chilodiplus
- Species: C. albertisii

Binomial name
- Chilodiplus albertisii Sharp, 1877

Species of beetle

Chilodiplus albertisii is a species of beetle of the family Scarabaeidae. It is found in Australia (Queensland: Cape York Peninsula).

== Description ==
Adults reach a length of about 11.5–13.6 mm (0.45–0.54 in). The clypeus and anterior portion of the head are brown to black, while the posterior portion of the head is black. The sides of the pronotum are yellowish. The scutellum is dark brown to black and the elytra are yellowish. The ventral surface and the legs are yellowish-brown.
