= Enamillus clevensis =

Scientific classification
- Kingdom: Animalia
- Phylum: Arthropoda
- Clade: Pancrustacea
- Class: Insecta
- Order: Coleoptera
- Suborder: Polyphaga
- Infraorder: Scarabaeiformia
- Family: Scarabaeidae
- Genus: Enamillus
- Species: E. clevensis

Binomial name
- Enamillus clevensis Allsopp, 1989

Species of beetle

Enamillus clevensis is a species of beetle of the family Scarabaeidae. It is found in Australia (South Australia).

== Description ==
Adults reach a length of about 11.8–12.3 mm (0.46–0.48 in). The head and pygidium are black and shiny, while the pronotum and elytra are black and pruinose. The antennae and ventral surface are blackish-brown and the legs brown to dark brown. They have yellow setae.

== Etymology ==
The species name refers to the type locality, Cleve, South Australia.
