= Diphucephala pygidialis =

Scientific classification
- Kingdom: Animalia
- Phylum: Arthropoda
- Clade: Pancrustacea
- Class: Insecta
- Order: Coleoptera
- Suborder: Polyphaga
- Infraorder: Scarabaeiformia
- Family: Scarabaeidae
- Genus: Diphucephala
- Species: D. pygidialis

Binomial name
- Diphucephala pygidialis Lea, 1916

Species of beetle

Diphucephala pygidialis is a species of beetle of the family Scarabaeidae. It is found in Australia (Western Australia).

== Description ==
Adults reach a length of about 8–10.5 mm (0.31–0.41 in). They are bright metallic-green or coppery-green, with the two or three basal joints of the antennae reddish, and the others black. The underside of the clypeal tips is black and shining, the tarsi are blue or purple, the claws black, and the tips of the front tibiae reddish. There are white, moderately long setae or elongate scales, fairly dense on the head and moderately dense on the sides, base, and along the middle of the pronotum (and a few scattered elsewhere). These scales form feeble lines on the elytra. The underside and legs have moderately long white hairs, forming a tuft on the pygidium and becoming black on parts of the tarsi.
