= Watkinsia monteithi =

Scientific classification
- Kingdom: Animalia
- Phylum: Arthropoda
- Clade: Pancrustacea
- Class: Insecta
- Order: Coleoptera
- Suborder: Polyphaga
- Infraorder: Scarabaeiformia
- Family: Scarabaeidae
- Genus: Watkinsia
- Species: W. monteithi

Binomial name
- Watkinsia monteithi Britton, 1995

Species of beetle

Watkinsia monteithi is a species of beetle of the family Scarabaeidae. It is found in Australia (Queensland).

== Description ==
Adults reach a length of about 5.2–5.6 mm (0.20–0.22 in). The pronotum is shining black with cupreous reflections on the disc, becoming metallic green at the lateral margins. The basal part of the disc of the elytra is testaceous, while the apical part is shining black. There are punctures with pale setae, as well as black erect setae. The underside and abdomen are metallic green with long, pale setae.
