= Diphucephala glabra =

Scientific classification
- Kingdom: Animalia
- Phylum: Arthropoda
- Clade: Pancrustacea
- Class: Insecta
- Order: Coleoptera
- Suborder: Polyphaga
- Infraorder: Scarabaeiformia
- Family: Scarabaeidae
- Genus: Diphucephala
- Species: D. glabra

Binomial name
- Diphucephala glabra Lea, 1930

Species of beetle

Diphucephala glabra is a species of beetle of the family Scarabaeidae. It is found in Australia (New South Wales).

== Description ==
Adults reach a length of about 8–9 mm (0.31–0.35 in). They are green, coppery-green or coppery, while the elytra are red with a green or coppery-green gloss. The lower surface of the clypeus is blackish and the antennae (except for the black club) and legs are reddish. The upper surface is glabrous, while the underside, pygidium and legs are rather densely covered with white setae.
