= Watkinsia vicina =

Scientific classification
- Kingdom: Animalia
- Phylum: Arthropoda
- Clade: Pancrustacea
- Class: Insecta
- Order: Coleoptera
- Suborder: Polyphaga
- Infraorder: Scarabaeiformia
- Family: Scarabaeidae
- Genus: Watkinsia
- Species: W. vicina

Binomial name
- Watkinsia vicina Britton, 1995

Species of beetle

Watkinsia vicina is a species of beetle of the family Scarabaeidae. It is found in Australia (Queensland).

== Description ==
Adults reach a length of about 5.2–5.6 mm (0.20–0.22 in). The antennae are testaceous with a black club. The pronotum is shining black, with a metallic green or cupreous reflection. The scutellum is shining black with a metallic green reflection and the elytra are shining black with cupreous or metallic green reflections.
