= Watkinsia tenebrosa =

Scientific classification
- Kingdom: Animalia
- Phylum: Arthropoda
- Clade: Pancrustacea
- Class: Insecta
- Order: Coleoptera
- Suborder: Polyphaga
- Infraorder: Scarabaeiformia
- Family: Scarabaeidae
- Genus: Watkinsia
- Species: W. tenebrosa

Binomial name
- Watkinsia tenebrosa Britton, 1995

Species of beetle

Watkinsia tenebrosa is a species of beetle of the family Scarabaeidae. It is found in Australia (Queensland).

== Description ==
Adults reach a length of about 5.75–6.25 mm (0.226–0.246 in). The antennae are testaceous with a black club. The pronotum and scutellum are black with a cupreous reflection. The elytra are shining black with a slight aeneous reflection. There are punctures on the disc which are distributed in five rows.
