= Cunderdinia setistriata =

Scientific classification
- Kingdom: Animalia
- Phylum: Arthropoda
- Clade: Pancrustacea
- Class: Insecta
- Order: Coleoptera
- Suborder: Polyphaga
- Infraorder: Scarabaeiformia
- Family: Scarabaeidae
- Genus: Cunderdinia
- Species: C. setistriata

Binomial name
- Cunderdinia setistriata Lea, 1930

Species of beetle

Cunderdinia setistriata is a species of beetle of the family Scarabaeidae. It is found in Australia (Western Australia).

== Description ==
Adults reach a length of about 7–8 mm (0.28–0.31 in). They are bright metallic coppery-green, with parts of the legs blue, the tarsi purplish, and the antennae and palpi black. The head, sides of the pronotum and lines on the elytra have white setae, which become hairs on the underside and legs.
