= Cunderdinia orientalis =

Scientific classification
- Kingdom: Animalia
- Phylum: Arthropoda
- Clade: Pancrustacea
- Class: Insecta
- Order: Coleoptera
- Suborder: Polyphaga
- Infraorder: Scarabaeiformia
- Family: Scarabaeidae
- Genus: Cunderdinia
- Species: C. orientalis

Binomial name
- Cunderdinia orientalis Britton, 1995

Species of beetle

Cunderdinia orientalis is a species of beetle of the family Scarabaeidae. It is found in Australia (New South Wales).

== Description ==
Adults reach a length of about 5.25–7.5 mm (0.207–0.295 in). They have a brilliant metallic green or cupreous body. The pronotum, clypeus and frons are densely punctured, with the punctures on the clypeus, anterior half of the frons and margins of the pronotum bearing white setae. The disc of the elytra has longitudinal lines of fine, white setae.
