= Diphucephala tarsalis =

Scientific classification
- Kingdom: Animalia
- Phylum: Arthropoda
- Clade: Pancrustacea
- Class: Insecta
- Order: Coleoptera
- Suborder: Polyphaga
- Infraorder: Scarabaeiformia
- Family: Scarabaeidae
- Genus: Diphucephala
- Species: D. tarsalis

Binomial name
- Diphucephala tarsalis Lea, 1916

Species of beetle

Diphucephala tarsalis is a species of beetle of the family Scarabaeidae. It is found in Australia (Queensland, New South Wales).

== Description ==
Adults reach a length of about 6–6.5 mm (0.24–0.26 in). They are bright metallic golden-green, with the antennae (except for the black club) and legs (except for the blackish claws) reddish. They are moderately densely clothed with rather long, stramineous setae, becoming denser and paler on the underside and pygidium, but the latter is glabrous at the apex.
