= Diphucephala concinna =

Scientific classification
- Kingdom: Animalia
- Phylum: Arthropoda
- Clade: Pancrustacea
- Class: Insecta
- Order: Coleoptera
- Suborder: Polyphaga
- Infraorder: Scarabaeiformia
- Family: Scarabaeidae
- Genus: Diphucephala
- Species: D. concinna

Binomial name
- Diphucephala concinna Lea, 1930

Species of beetle

Diphucephala concinna is a species of beetle of the family Scarabaeidae. It is found in Australia (Queensland).

== Description ==
Adults reach a length of about 6–7 mm (0.24–0.28 in). They are bright metallic-green, with some coppery-green areas. The antennae (except for the blackish club) and legs are pale reddish. They are moderately densely clothed with short, white setae or thin scales, becoming denser on underside.
