= Diphucephala dicksoniae =

Scientific classification
- Kingdom: Animalia
- Phylum: Arthropoda
- Clade: Pancrustacea
- Class: Insecta
- Order: Coleoptera
- Suborder: Polyphaga
- Infraorder: Scarabaeiformia
- Family: Scarabaeidae
- Genus: Diphucephala
- Species: D. dicksoniae

Binomial name
- Diphucephala dicksoniae Lea, 1930

Species of beetle

Diphucephala dicksoniae is a species of beetle of the family Scarabaeidae. It is found in Australia (New South Wales).

== Description ==
Adults reach a length of about 9–11 mm (0.35–0.43 in). They are metallic-green or coppery-green, while the elytra are reddish with a green or coppery-green gloss. The legs are reddish, and the antennae and lower surface of the clypeus are black or blackish. The upper surface has rather sparse white setae, which become denser and longer on the underside and legs.

== Life history ==
They have been found on Dicksonia antarctica.
