= Diphucephalini =

Scientific classification
- Kingdom: Animalia
- Phylum: Arthropoda
- Clade: Pancrustacea
- Class: Insecta
- Order: Coleoptera
- Suborder: Polyphaga
- Infraorder: Scarabaeiformia
- Family: Scarabaeidae
- Subfamily: Sericinae
- Tribe: Diphucephalini; Laporte, 1840

Synonyms
- Diphucephalidae Burmeister, 1855

Tribe of beetles

Diphucephalini is a tribe of scarab beetles in the family Scarabaeidae.

== Genera ==
The following genera are recognised in the tribe Diphucephalini:

- Cunderdinia Lea, 1916
- Diphucephala Le Peletier de Saint-Fargeau & Audinet-Serville, 1828
- Watkinsia Britton, 1995
