= Diphucephala insularis =

Scientific classification
- Kingdom: Animalia
- Phylum: Arthropoda
- Clade: Pancrustacea
- Class: Insecta
- Order: Coleoptera
- Suborder: Polyphaga
- Infraorder: Scarabaeiformia
- Family: Scarabaeidae
- Genus: Diphucephala
- Species: D. insularis

Binomial name
- Diphucephala insularis Lea, 1916

Species of beetle

Diphucephala insularis is a species of beetle of the family Scarabaeidae. It is found in Australia (Queensland).

== Description ==
Adults reach a length of about 5.5–6 mm (0.22–0.24 in). They are bright metallic-green or coppery-green, with the tarsi blue or purple, and the antennae, palpi, and underside of the tips of the clypeus black. They are moderately clothed with stramineous setae, which have a somewhat lineate appearance on the elytra. These setae denser and paler on the underside and pygidium, but the latter is glabrous at the tip.
