= Cunderdinia =

Scientific classification
- Kingdom: Animalia
- Phylum: Arthropoda
- Clade: Pancrustacea
- Class: Insecta
- Order: Coleoptera
- Suborder: Polyphaga
- Infraorder: Scarabaeiformia
- Family: Scarabaeidae
- Subfamily: Sericinae
- Tribe: Diphucephalini
- Genus: Cunderdinia; Lea, 1916

Genus of beetles

Cunderdinia is a genus of beetles belonging to the family Scarabaeidae.

== Species ==
- Cunderdinia orientalis Britton, 1995
- Cunderdinia setistriata Lea, 1930
- Cunderdinia variabilis Lea, 1916
