= Watkinsia =

Scientific classification
- Kingdom: Animalia
- Phylum: Arthropoda
- Clade: Pancrustacea
- Class: Insecta
- Order: Coleoptera
- Suborder: Polyphaga
- Infraorder: Scarabaeiformia
- Family: Scarabaeidae
- Subfamily: Sericinae
- Tribe: Diphucephalini
- Genus: Watkinsia; Britton, 1995

Genus of beetles

Watkinsia is a genus of beetles belonging to the family Scarabaeidae.

== Species ==
- Watkinsia bella Britton, 1995
- Watkinsia incendiala Allsopp, 2021
- Watkinsia macrops (Lea, 1924)
- Watkinsia megalops Britton, 1995
- Watkinsia monteithi Britton, 1995
- Watkinsia sedlaceki Britton, 1995
- Watkinsia tenebrosa Britton, 1995
- Watkinsia vicina Britton, 1995
- Watkinsia williamsi Britton, 1995
