= Diphucephala montana =

Scientific classification
- Kingdom: Animalia
- Phylum: Arthropoda
- Clade: Pancrustacea
- Class: Insecta
- Order: Coleoptera
- Suborder: Polyphaga
- Infraorder: Scarabaeiformia
- Family: Scarabaeidae
- Genus: Diphucephala
- Species: D. montana

Binomial name
- Diphucephala montana Lea, 1930

Species of beetle

Diphucephala montana is a species of beetle of the family Scarabaeidae. It is found in Australia (New South Wales).

== Description ==
Adults reach a length of about 6–7 mm (0.24–0.28 in). They are metallic-green or coppery-green, with the antennae and legs black. They are rather sparsely clothed with white setae, becoming moderately dense on the underside.
