= Watkinsia megalops =

Scientific classification
- Kingdom: Animalia
- Phylum: Arthropoda
- Clade: Pancrustacea
- Class: Insecta
- Order: Coleoptera
- Suborder: Polyphaga
- Infraorder: Scarabaeiformia
- Family: Scarabaeidae
- Genus: Watkinsia
- Species: W. megalops

Binomial name
- Watkinsia megalops Britton, 1995

Species of beetle

Watkinsia megalops is a species of beetle of the family Scarabaeidae. It is found in Australia (Queensland).

== Description ==
Adults reach a length of about 4.5–5.2 mm (0.18–0.20 in). The antennae are pale testaceous. The disc of the pronotum is shining metallic green, blue or purple with punctures along the anterior margin. These punctures bear short setae. The disc is also punctured, with these punctures also bearing short, pale setae. The scutellum is shining metallic green and the elytra are shining, metallic green, blue or purple, the disc with punctured, longitudinal striae. The punctures bear white setae.
