= Cunderdinia variabilis =

Scientific classification
- Kingdom: Animalia
- Phylum: Arthropoda
- Clade: Pancrustacea
- Class: Insecta
- Order: Coleoptera
- Suborder: Polyphaga
- Infraorder: Scarabaeiformia
- Family: Scarabaeidae
- Genus: Cunderdinia
- Species: C. variabilis

Binomial name
- Cunderdinia variabilis Lea, 1916

Species of beetle

Cunderdinia variabilis is a species of beetle of the family Scarabaeidae. It is found in Australia (Western Australia).

== Description ==
Adults reach a length of about 7.5–8 mm (0.30–0.31 in). They are bright metallic-green, with the tibiae and tarsi purple, the antennae black. The two basal joints of the palpi are reddish, and the two apical joints are black. The underside has areas with dense white scales, as well as long white hair. The legs also have white hairs, and the pygidium has both hairs and scales. There are a few white setae at the apical area of the elytra.
