= Watkinsia williamsi =

Scientific classification
- Kingdom: Animalia
- Phylum: Arthropoda
- Clade: Pancrustacea
- Class: Insecta
- Order: Coleoptera
- Suborder: Polyphaga
- Infraorder: Scarabaeiformia
- Family: Scarabaeidae
- Genus: Watkinsia
- Species: W. williamsi

Binomial name
- Watkinsia williamsi Britton, 1995

Species of beetle

Watkinsia williamsi is a species of beetle of the family Scarabaeidae. It is found in Australia (New South Wales).

== Description ==
Adults reach a length of about 5.75 mm (0.226 in). The pronotum is cupreous and shining, with the disc coarsely punctured. The punctures bear short, pale setae. The scutellum is metallic green, smooth and shining and the elytra are cupreous and shining. The punctures on the disc are arranged in four longitudinal striae and the punctures bear short, pale setae.
