= Watkinsia sedlaceki =

Scientific classification
- Kingdom: Animalia
- Phylum: Arthropoda
- Clade: Pancrustacea
- Class: Insecta
- Order: Coleoptera
- Suborder: Polyphaga
- Infraorder: Scarabaeiformia
- Family: Scarabaeidae
- Genus: Watkinsia
- Species: W. sedlaceki

Binomial name
- Watkinsia sedlaceki Britton, 1995

Species of beetle

Watkinsia sedlaceki is a species of beetle of the family Scarabaeidae. It is found in Australia (Queensland).

== Description ==
Adults reach a length of about 5.2–6.4 mm (0.20–0.25 in). The antennae are brown with a black club. The pronotum is punctured, with the punctures bearing erect, black setae. The scutellum is shining dark metallic green. The elytra have longitudinal punctured striae, the punctures bearing short pale setae and a few long black setae. The basal part of the disc is testaceous, while the distal part is dark metallic purple.
