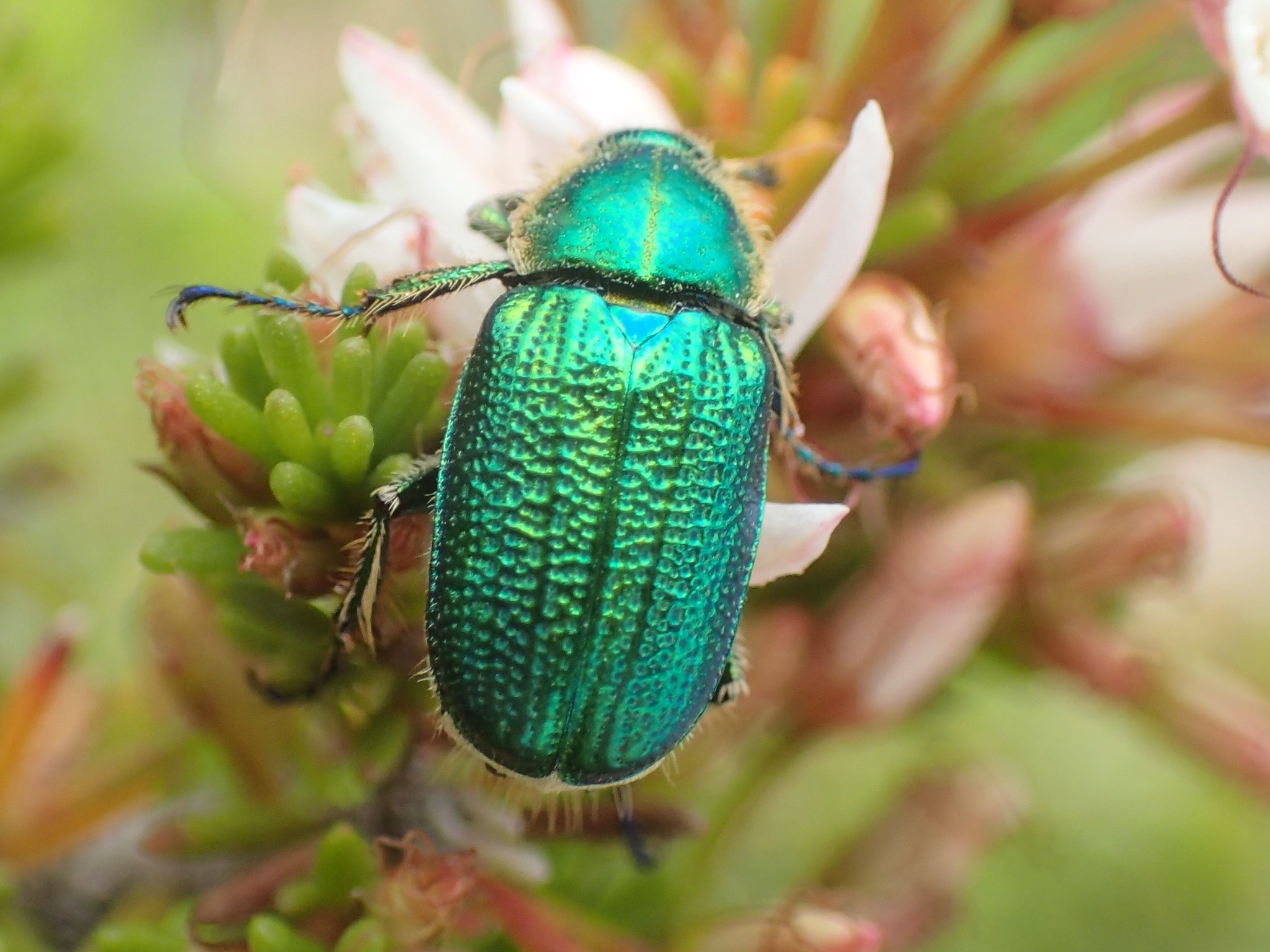
- Diphucephala colaspidoides

Scientific classification
- Kingdom: Animalia
- Phylum: Arthropoda
- Clade: Pancrustacea
- Class: Insecta
- Order: Coleoptera
- Suborder: Polyphaga
- Infraorder: Scarabaeiformia
- Family: Scarabaeidae
- Tribe: Diphucephalini
- Genus: Diphucephala; Le Peletier & Serville, 1828

= Diphucephala =

Genus of scarab beetles

Diphucephala is a genus of beetles in the subfamily Sericinae.

The species of this genus are found in Australia.

== Species ==
The following species are recognised in the genus Diphucephala:

- Diphucephala affinis Waterhouse, 1837
- Diphucephala angusticeps MacLeay, 1886
- Diphucephala aurolimbata Blanchard, 1850
- Diphucephala aurulenta (Kirby, 1818)
- Diphucephala azureipennis MacLeay, 1886
- Diphucephala barnardi MacLeay, 1886
- Diphucephala bernhardti Hawkeswood, 1992
- Diphucephala beryllina Burmeister, 1855
- Diphucephala carteri Blackburn, 1906
- Diphucephala castanoptera Waterhouse, 1837
- Diphucephala childrenii Waterhouse, 1837
- Diphucephala coerulea MacLeay, 1883
- Diphucephala colaspidoides (Gyllenhal, 1817)
- Diphucephala concinna Lea, 1930
- Diphucephala crebra Blackburn, 1906
- Diphucephala cribripennis Lea, 1924
- Diphucephala cuprea MacLeay, 1886
- Diphucephala dentipes Oke, 1951
- Diphucephala dicksoniae Lea, 1930
- Diphucephala edwardsi Waterhouse, 1837
- Diphucephala elegans Blackburn, 1892
- Diphucephala fulgida Boisduval, 1835
- Diphucephala furcata Guérin-Méneville, 1830
- Diphucephala glabra Lea, 1930
- Diphucephala hirtipennis MacLeay, 1883
- Diphucephala hirtipes Lea, 1916
- Diphucephala hopei Waterhouse, 1837
- Diphucephala humeralis MacLeay, 1886
- Diphucephala ignota MacLeay, 1886
- Diphucephala insularis Lea, 1916
- Diphucephala lateralis MacLeay, 1886
- Diphucephala laticeps MacLeay, 1886
- Diphucephala laticollis Lea, 1895
- Diphucephala latipennis MacLeay, 1883
- Diphucephala lineata Boisduval, 1835
- Diphucephala mastersi MacLeay, 1886
- Diphucephala minima MacLeay, 1886
- Diphucephala montana Lea, 1930
- Diphucephala nigritarsis Lea, 1917
- Diphucephala nitens MacLeay, 1886
- Diphucephala nitidicollis MacLeay, 1886
- Diphucephala obscura MacLeay, 1886
- Diphucephala obsoleta MacLeay, 1886
- Diphucephala parviceps Lea, 1924
- Diphucephala parvula Waterhouse, 1837
- Diphucephala prasina MacLeay, 1886
- Diphucephala puberula Blackburn, 1906
- Diphucephala pubescens MacLeay, 1886
- Diphucephala pubiventris Burmeister, 1855
- Diphucephala pulchella Waterhouse, 1837
- Diphucephala pulcherrima Blackburn, 1906
- Diphucephala purpureitarsis MacLeay, 1886
- Diphucephala pygidialis Lea, 1916
- Diphucephala pygmaea Waterhouse, 1837
- Diphucephala quadratigera Blanchard, 1850
- Diphucephala rectipennis Blackburn, 1906
- Diphucephala regalis Lea, 1917
- Diphucephala richmondia MacLeay, 1886
- Diphucephala rufipes Waterhouse, 1837
- Diphucephala rugosa Boisduval, 1835
- Diphucephala rugosula Dalle Torre, 1912
- Diphucephala sericea (Kirby, 1818)
- Diphucephala smaragdula Boisduval, 1835
- Diphucephala sordida Blackburn, 1906
- Diphucephala spreta Blackburn, 1892
- Diphucephala tantilla Lea, 1917
- Diphucephala tarsalis Lea, 1916
- Diphucephala waterhousei Burmeister, 1855
