= Watkinsia bella =

Scientific classification
- Kingdom: Animalia
- Phylum: Arthropoda
- Clade: Pancrustacea
- Class: Insecta
- Order: Coleoptera
- Suborder: Polyphaga
- Infraorder: Scarabaeiformia
- Family: Scarabaeidae
- Genus: Watkinsia
- Species: W. bella

Binomial name
- Watkinsia bella Britton, 1995

Species of beetle

Watkinsia bella is a species of beetle of the family Scarabaeidae. It is found in Australia (New South Wales).

== Description ==
Adults reach a length of about 6.5–7.5 mm (0.26–0.30 in) for males and 8–8.5 mm (0.31–0.33 in) for females. The disc of the pronotum is shining cupreous with metallic green margins or entirely metallic green. The elytra are black with cupreous reflections or testaceous. Both the pygidium and underside are dark metallic green. There are long black and shorter pale setae on the disc of the pronotum, the elytra and pygidium.
