= Watkinsia macrops =

Scientific classification
- Kingdom: Animalia
- Phylum: Arthropoda
- Clade: Pancrustacea
- Class: Insecta
- Order: Coleoptera
- Suborder: Polyphaga
- Infraorder: Scarabaeiformia
- Family: Scarabaeidae
- Genus: Watkinsia
- Species: W. macrops

Binomial name
- Watkinsia macrops (Lea, 1924)

Synonyms
- Diphucephala macrops Lea, 1924

Species of beetle

Watkinsia macrops is a species of beetle of the family Scarabaeidae. It is found in Australia (New South Wales).

== Description ==
Adults reach a length of about 6.5 mm (0.26 in). The antennae are pale testaceous with a dark brown club. The disc of the pronotum is shining, metallic greenish blue with pale brown setae. The scutellum is greenish blue and shining and the elytra are testaceous with the apical angles black. They are punctured, with the punctures bearing long, pale setae.
