= Diphucephala hirtipes =

Scientific classification
- Kingdom: Animalia
- Phylum: Arthropoda
- Clade: Pancrustacea
- Class: Insecta
- Order: Coleoptera
- Suborder: Polyphaga
- Infraorder: Scarabaeiformia
- Family: Scarabaeidae
- Genus: Diphucephala
- Species: D. hirtipes

Binomial name
- Diphucephala hirtipes Lea, 1916

Species of beetle

Diphucephala hirtipes is a species of beetle of the family Scarabaeidae. It is found in Australia (Queensland).

== Description ==
Adults reach a length of about 9 mm (0.35 in). They are bright metallic-green, with the densely clothed parts more or less coppery. The club of the antennae, hind tibiae (except at the base), hind tarsi, and parts of the others, are black or blackish. The rest of the legs and of the antennae are reddish. The head and pronotum (except for a large medio-basal sub-quadrate space) and hind coxae have dense depressed scales, which are more or less stramineous in colour. The abdomen has paler scales, but along the middle with long stramineous hairs, becoming almost tufted at the tip. The pygidium is densely squamose. The legs have stramineous hairs, becoming much longer, blackish, and very conspicuous on the hind tibiae and tarsi.
