= Photyna tomentosa =

Scientific classification
- Kingdom: Animalia
- Phylum: Arthropoda
- Clade: Pancrustacea
- Class: Insecta
- Order: Coleoptera
- Suborder: Polyphaga
- Infraorder: Scarabaeiformia
- Family: Scarabaeidae
- Genus: Photyna
- Species: P. tomentosa

Binomial name
- Photyna tomentosa Brenske, 1897

Species of beetle

Photyna tomentosa is a species of beetle of the family Scarabaeidae. It is found in China.

== Description ==
Adults reach a length of about 9 mm (0.35 in). The shape of the body is identical to that of Photyna rugicollis. The clypeus, frons and vertex are densely covered with short hair. The pronotum is densely covered with brush-like hair. The hairs are golden-yellow, somewhat darker in the middle. The elytra are evenly covered with fine, sparse hair. The suture and two oblique transverse bands are faintly marked by scale-like hairs. The underside of the abdomen has dense, appressed white hair, with the brown ground colour visible. The legs have sparse, fine hair.
