= Dichelomorpha tonkinensis =

Scientific classification
- Kingdom: Animalia
- Phylum: Arthropoda
- Clade: Pancrustacea
- Class: Insecta
- Order: Coleoptera
- Suborder: Polyphaga
- Infraorder: Scarabaeiformia
- Family: Scarabaeidae
- Genus: Dichelomorpha
- Species: D. tonkinensis

Binomial name
- Dichelomorpha tonkinensis Moser, 1917

Species of beetle

Dichelomorpha tonkinensis is a species of beetle of the family Scarabaeidae. It is found in Vietnam.

== Description ==
Adults reach a length of about 6–8 mm (0.24–0.31 in). They are similar to yellow specimens of Dichelomorpha nigra. On the upper surface, the yellow scales are densely packed everywhere, and on the pronotum, there are similarly some erect setae. The black sides of the elytra extend to the shoulders. The underside is densely covered with yellowish-grey scales.

== Subspecies ==
- Dichelomorpha tonkinensis tonkinensis (Vietnam)
- Dichelomorpha tonkinensis cochinchinae Prokofiev, 2016 (Vietnam)
