= Xenoceraspis =

Scientific classification
- Kingdom: Animalia
- Phylum: Arthropoda
- Clade: Pancrustacea
- Class: Insecta
- Order: Coleoptera
- Suborder: Polyphaga
- Infraorder: Scarabaeiformia
- Family: Scarabaeidae
- Subfamily: Melolonthinae
- Tribe: Diphycerini
- Genus: Xenoceraspis; Arrow, 1920

Genus of beetles

Xenoceraspis is a genus of beetles belonging to the family Scarabaeidae.

== Species ==
- Xenoceraspis calcarata Zhang, 1988
- Xenoceraspis kurseongana (Moser, 1917)
- Xenoceraspis longimacularia Zhang, 1988
