= Xenoceraspis calcarata =

Scientific classification
- Kingdom: Animalia
- Phylum: Arthropoda
- Clade: Pancrustacea
- Class: Insecta
- Order: Coleoptera
- Suborder: Polyphaga
- Infraorder: Scarabaeiformia
- Family: Scarabaeidae
- Genus: Xenoceraspis
- Species: X. calcarata

Binomial name
- Xenoceraspis calcarata Zhang, 1988

Synonyms
- Xenoceraspis calcaratus

Species of beetle

Xenoceraspis calcarata is a species of beetle of the family Scarabaeidae. It is found in China (Sichuan, Xizang).

== Description ==
Adults reach a length of about 10.2–11.1 mm (0.40–0.44 in). They have an elongate, moderately convex body. The surface is black, with the elytra pale brown with blackish margins. The head and pronotum are covered with short, semi-erect setae mixed with very sparse, long ones. There are also long, erect setae on the lateral parts of the elytra.
