= Dichelomorpha =

Scientific classification
- Kingdom: Animalia
- Phylum: Arthropoda
- Clade: Pancrustacea
- Class: Insecta
- Order: Coleoptera
- Suborder: Polyphaga
- Infraorder: Scarabaeiformia
- Family: Scarabaeidae
- Subfamily: Melolonthinae
- Tribe: Diphycerini
- Genus: Dichelomorpha; Burmeister, 1855

Synonyms
- Sinochelus Fairmaire, 1900; Dejeania Blanchard, 1850

Genus of leaf beetles

Dichelomorpha is a genus of beetles belonging to the family Scarabaeidae.

== Species ==
- Dichelomorpha alsiosia (Blanchard, 1850)
- Dichelomorpha amoena Frey, 1970
- Dichelomorpha aranea Arrow, 1920
- Dichelomorpha assamensis Arrow, 1920
- Dichelomorpha borneensis (Brenske, 1894)
- Dichelomorpha brenskei (Nonfried, 1891)
- Dichelomorpha brunneipes Prokofiev, 2016
- Dichelomorpha cinctipennis (Fairmaire, 1900)
- Dichelomorpha delauneyi (Fleutiaux, 1887)
- Dichelomorpha densesquamosa Frey, 1970
- Dichelomorpha felina Arrow, 1920
- Dichelomorpha limbata (Fairmaire, 1900)
- Dichelomorpha malaccensis Moser, 1917
- Dichelomorpha marginata (Nonfried, 1895)
- Dichelomorpha medana Moser, 1924
- Dichelomorpha multicolor Arrow, 1920
- Dichelomorpha nigra (Brenske, 1894)
- Dichelomorpha nitidicollis Arrow, 1920
- Dichelomorpha ochracea Burmeister, 1855
- Dichelomorpha pallida Arrow, 1920
- Dichelomorpha pulchella Arrow, 1920
- Dichelomorpha punctuligera (Walker, 1859)
- Dichelomorpha rufipennis Arrow, 1920
- Dichelomorpha sublineata Miyake, 1994
- Dichelomorpha sumatrana (Nonfried, 1894)
- Dichelomorpha sumatrensis Frey, 1975
- Dichelomorpha tonkinensis Moser, 1917
- Dichelomorpha unidens Frey, 1973
- Dichelomorpha uniformis Arrow, 1920
