= Xenoceraspis kurseongana =

Scientific classification
- Kingdom: Animalia
- Phylum: Arthropoda
- Clade: Pancrustacea
- Class: Insecta
- Order: Coleoptera
- Suborder: Polyphaga
- Infraorder: Scarabaeiformia
- Family: Scarabaeidae
- Genus: Xenoceraspis
- Species: X. kurseongana

Binomial name
- Xenoceraspis kurseongana (Moser, 1917)

Synonyms
- Dichelomorpha kurseongana Moser, 1917; Xenoceraspis dispar Arrow, 1920

Species of beetle

Xenoceraspis kurseongana is a species of beetle of the family Scarabaeidae. It is found in India (Sikkim, West Bengal).

== Description ==
Adults reach a length of about 9.1–10 mm (0.36–0.39 in). They have an elongate, moderately convex body. The dorsal surface is brown or black, with the elytra brown, brown with longitudinal black stripe or completely black. The ventral surface is brown to blackish brown. The head appendages are brown and shiny with black and pale hairs.
