= Photyna =

Scientific classification
- Kingdom: Animalia
- Phylum: Arthropoda
- Clade: Pancrustacea
- Class: Insecta
- Order: Coleoptera
- Suborder: Polyphaga
- Infraorder: Scarabaeiformia
- Family: Scarabaeidae
- Subfamily: Melolonthinae
- Tribe: Diphycerini
- Genus: Photyna; Brenske, 1897

Genus of beetles

Photyna is a genus of beetles belonging to the family Scarabaeidae.

== Species ==
- Photyna ornata Arrow, 1925
- Photyna rugicollis Brenske, 1897
- Photyna tomentosa Brenske, 1897
