= Diphycerini =

Scientific classification
- Kingdom: Animalia
- Phylum: Arthropoda
- Clade: Pancrustacea
- Class: Insecta
- Order: Coleoptera
- Suborder: Polyphaga
- Infraorder: Scarabaeiformia
- Family: Scarabaeidae
- Subfamily: Melolonthinae
- Tribe: Diphycerini; Medvedev, 1952

Tribe of beetles

Diphycerini is a tribe of scarab beetles in the family Scarabaeidae.

== Genera ==
The following genera are recognised in the tribe Diphycerini:

- Dichelomorpha Burmeister, 1855
- Dicheloschema Moser, 1924
- Diphycerus Fairmaire, 1878
- Hyperius Fairmaire, 1878
- Photyna Brenske, 1897
- Xenoceraspis Arrow, 1920
