= Dichelomorpha malaccensis =

Scientific classification
- Kingdom: Animalia
- Phylum: Arthropoda
- Clade: Pancrustacea
- Class: Insecta
- Order: Coleoptera
- Suborder: Polyphaga
- Infraorder: Scarabaeiformia
- Family: Scarabaeidae
- Genus: Dichelomorpha
- Species: D. malaccensis

Binomial name
- Dichelomorpha malaccensis Moser, 1917

Species of beetle

Dichelomorpha malaccensis is a species of beetle of the family Scarabaeidae. It is found in Malaysia (Malacca).

== Description ==
Adults reach a length of about 6 mm (0.24 in). They are brown, the upper surface with greyish-brown scales. The head is wrinkled and punctate, the punctures bearing elongate, bristle-like scales. The clypeus tapers towards the front, the margins are raised, the anterior margin is not indented, the anterior angles are shortly rounded. The antennae are yellowish-brown, with a blackish-brown club. The pronotum is as wide as it is long posteriorly, arched in the middle. The lateral margins are very weakly indented behind the middle, the anterior and posterior angles are obtuse. The base is incised on both sides of the scutellum. The surface is densely covered with elongate scales. Between them are slightly lighter setae. The elytra are densely scaled, the scales are pointed. Lighter-colored bristle-like scales are arranged in rows. The pygidium is triangular with a rounded tip and the scales on it are somewhat bristle-like. The underside and legs are covered with grey setae.
