= Dichelomorpha sumatrensis =

Scientific classification
- Kingdom: Animalia
- Phylum: Arthropoda
- Clade: Pancrustacea
- Class: Insecta
- Order: Coleoptera
- Suborder: Polyphaga
- Infraorder: Scarabaeiformia
- Family: Scarabaeidae
- Genus: Dichelomorpha
- Species: D. sumatrensis

Binomial name
- Dichelomorpha sumatrensis Frey, 1975

Species of beetle

Dichelomorpha sumatrensis is a species of beetle of the family Scarabaeidae. It is found in Indonesia (Sumatra).

== Description ==
Adults reach a length of about 7 mm. The upper surface is dark reddish-brown, the head dark brown and the underside and legs light reddish-brown. The pronotum, scutellum, elytra, and pygidium are extremely densely covered with oval, yellowish scales (which are whitish on the scutellum). The antennae are brown.
