= Xenoceraspis longimacularia =

Scientific classification
- Kingdom: Animalia
- Phylum: Arthropoda
- Clade: Pancrustacea
- Class: Insecta
- Order: Coleoptera
- Suborder: Polyphaga
- Infraorder: Scarabaeiformia
- Family: Scarabaeidae
- Genus: Xenoceraspis
- Species: X. longimacularia

Binomial name
- Xenoceraspis longimacularia Zhang, 1988

Synonyms
- Xenoceraspis longimacularis

Species of beetle

Xenoceraspis longimacularia is a species of beetle of the family Scarabaeidae. It is found in China (Xizang) and India (Arunachal Pradesh).

== Description ==
Adults reach a length of about 8.2–11.2 mm (0.32–0.44 in). They have an elongate, moderately convex body. The dorsal surface is brown, while the ventral surface is blackish brown. They are shiny with black and pale hairs.
