= Photyna rugicollis =

Scientific classification
- Kingdom: Animalia
- Phylum: Arthropoda
- Clade: Pancrustacea
- Class: Insecta
- Order: Coleoptera
- Suborder: Polyphaga
- Infraorder: Scarabaeiformia
- Family: Scarabaeidae
- Genus: Photyna
- Species: P. rugicollis

Binomial name
- Photyna rugicollis Brenske, 1897

Species of beetle

Photyna rugicollis is a species of beetle of the family Scarabaeidae. It is found in China.

== Description ==
Adults reach a length of about 9 mm (0.35 in). They are slender, black, somewhat glossy and thinly covered with scales.
