= Dichelomorpha nigra =

Scientific classification
- Kingdom: Animalia
- Phylum: Arthropoda
- Clade: Pancrustacea
- Class: Insecta
- Order: Coleoptera
- Suborder: Polyphaga
- Infraorder: Scarabaeiformia
- Family: Scarabaeidae
- Genus: Dichelomorpha
- Species: D. nigra

Binomial name
- Dichelomorpha nigra (Brenske, 1894)

Synonyms
- Dejeania nigra Brenske, 1894; Dichelomorpha variabilis Moser, 1917

Species of beetle

Dichelomorpha nigra is a species of beetle of the family Scarabaeidae. It is found in Brunei and Malaysia (Sabah).

== Description ==
Adults reach a length of about 4.5–6 mm (0.18–0.24 in). They are highly variable in colouration. The upper surface is either densely covered with yellow or yellowish scales, with only the sides of the elytra black behind the middle, or the scales on the upper surface are black, the base of the pronotum (usually except for the middle), the scutellum, a short transverse band in front of the middle of the elytra, and the suture behind this transverse band are yellow. Various intermediate forms exist between these two colourations. The pronotum is convex, the sides are rounded, with an incision on each side at the base in front of the scutellum. Besides the scales, the pronotum bears widely spaced, erect setae. The elytra taper slightly posteriorly. The pygidium is triangular, truncated at the end, and all scales of the pygidium are directed towards its center. The underside is covered with coarse scales, on the abdomen the scales are very dense.
