= List of data deficient insects =

- Extinct in the wild (EW): 1 species
- Critically endangered (CR): 520 species
- Endangered (EN): 1,132 species
- Vulnerable (VU): 1,082 species
- Near threatened (NT, LR/cd): 897 species
- Least concern (LC): 6,802 species
- Data deficient (DD): 3,255 species
Insect species (IUCN, 2025-2)
- 13,696 extant species have been evaluated
- 10,441 of those are fully assessed (Note: excludes data deficient evaluations.)
- 7,699 are not threatened at present
- 2,742 to 5,997 are threatened (Note: Threatened comprises CR, EN and VU. Upper estimate additionally includes DD.)
- 59 to 175 are extinct or extinct in the wild:
  - 58 extinct (EX) species (Note: Chart omits extinct (EX) species)
  - 1 extinct in the wild (EW)
  - 116 possibly extinct [CR(PE)]
  - 0 possibly extinct in the wild [CR(PEW)]

In July 2016, the International Union for Conservation of Nature (IUCN) listed 1702 data deficient insect species. Of all evaluated insect species, 28% are listed as data deficient. No subpopulations of insects have been evaluated by the IUCN.

This is a complete list of data deficient insect species and subspecies as evaluated by the IUCN.

== Blattodea ==
- Miriamrothschildia zonatus

== Orthoptera ==
There are 50 species in the order Orthoptera assessed as data deficient.

=== Acridids ===
- South-east African burrowing grasshopper (Acrotylus mossambicus)
- Piedmont banded grasshopper (Arcyptera alzonai)
- Hierro rock grasshopper (Arminda hierroensis)
- Kasulu grasshopper (Coryphosima cytidonota)
- Kibariani flightless grasshopper (Eyprepocnemis burtti)
- Malagarasi grasshopper (Eyprepocnemis reducta)
- Oberthür's grasshopper (Gymnobothrus oberthuri)
- Römer's gasshopper (Gymnobothrus roemeri)
- Crivellari's sand grasshopper (Sphingonotus crivellarii)
- Vesey-fitzgerald's mysterious grasshopper (Unalia fitzgeraldi)
- Azam's desert grasshopper (Xerohippus azami)
- Cyprian desert grasshopper (Xerohippus cyprius)
- Small desert grasshopper (Xerohippus sinuosus)

=== Tettigoniids ===
- Brown's shieldback (Alfredectes browni)
- Charpentier's black-winged clonia (Clonia charpentieri)
- Predatory slender clonia (Cloniella praedatoria)
- Grebenchikov's cone-head (Conocephalus grebenchikovi)
- Cederberg shieldback (Namaquadectes irroratus)
- Agiostrati bush-cricket (Rhacocleis agiostratica)
- Uvarov's bush-cricket (Rhacocleis uvarovi)

=== Phaneropterids ===
- Sopatas' black-kneed katydid (Aprosphylus sopatarum)
- Elegant winter katydid (Brinckiella elegans)
- Serrated winter katydid (Brinckiella serricauda)
- Green winter katydid (Brinckiella viridis)
- Belck's dimorphic leaf katydid (Conchotopoda belcki)
- Brunner's dimorphic leaf katydid (Conchotopoda brunneri)
- Rare dimorphic leaf katydid (Conchotopoda crassicauda)
- Zululand dimorphic leaf katydid (Conchotopoda grallatoria)
- Damara dimorphic leaf katydid (Conchotopoda leptocerca)
- Highveld dimorphic leaf katydid (Conchotopoda parva)
- Green ducetia (Ducetia chelocerca)
- Namibian agile katydid (Griffiniana pedestris)
- Spotted leaf katydid (Phaneroptera nigropunctata)
- Poecilimon bifenestratus
- Poecilimon tricuspis
- Angolan lace-winged katydid (Pseudosaga angolensis)
- Dark-edged leaf katydid (Symmetropleura plana)

=== Other Orthoptera species ===
- Kaikoura weta (Deinacrida parva)
- Baccetti's cave-cricket (Dolichopoda baccettii)
- Capri cave-cricket (Dolichopoda capreensis)
- Megalo Spilio cave-cricket (Dolichopoda giachinoi)
- Mucedda's cave-cricket (Dolichopoda muceddai)
- Cretan crevice-cricket (Gryllomorpha cretensis)
- Prairie mole cricket (Gryllotalpa major)
- False stripe-headed cricket (Modicogryllus pseudocyprius)
- Kinzelbach's scale-cricket (Mogoplistes kinzelbachi)
- Myrmecophilus mayaealberti
- Myrmecophilus seychellensis
- Phaloria insularis
- Subtiloria succineus

== Hymenoptera ==
There are 316 species in the order Hymenoptera assessed as data deficient.

=== Colletids ===
- Colletes dinizi
- Colletes standfussi
- Colletes tardus
- Hylaeus adriaticus
- Hylaeus alpinus
- Hylaeus azorae
- Hylaeus canariensis
- Hylaeus convergens
- Hylaeus deceptorius
- Hylaeus garrulus
- Hylaeus hellenicus
- Hylaeus hohmanni
- Hylaeus hyperpunctatus
- Hylaeus ibericus
- Hylaeus koenigsmanni
- Hylaeus maderensis
- Hylaeus milossus
- Hylaeus nivaliformis
- Hylaeus nivalis
- Hylaeus penalaris
- Hylaeus pictus
- Hylaeus pyrenaicus
- Hylaeus stigmorhinus
- Hylaeus teruelus

=== Melittids ===
- Dasypoda iberica
- Dasypoda radchenkoi
- Melitta budashkini
- Melitta iberica
- Melitta murciana
- Melitta seitzi
- Melitta tomentosa
- Melitta udmurtica

=== Apids ===
- Ammobatoides okalii
- Anthophora andalusica
- Anthophora balearica
- Anthophora dalmatica
- Anthophora gallica
- Anthophora laevigata
- Anthophora lanzarotensis
- Anthophora lieftincki
- Anthophora nigrovittata
- Anthophora orotavae
- Anthophora porphyrea
- Anthophora pruinosa
- Anthophora pulverosa
- Anthophora punctilabris
- Anthophora purpuraria
- Anthophora senicula
- Anthophora sichelii
- Anthophora thomsoni
- Anthophora uniciliata
- Bombus bellicosus
- Ashton's cuckoo bumblebee (Bombus bohemicus)
- Bombus brasiliensis
- Bombus brevivillus
- Bombus cryptarum
- Great yellow bumblebee (Bombus distinguendus)
- Bombus ecuadorius
- Bombus excellens
- Fernald cuckoo bumble bee (Bombus flavidus)
- Bombus hortulanus
- Bombus jonellus
- Bombus kirbiellus
- Bombus melaleucus
- High Arctic bumble bee (Bombus natvigi)
- Active bumble bee (Bombus neoboreus)
- Polar bumble bee (Bombus polaris)
- Bombus pullatus
- Bombus robustus
- Bombus rohweri
- Bombus rubicundus
- Bombus tucumanus
- Bombus vogti
- Ceratina cypriaca
- Ceratina teunisseni
- Epeolus compar
- Epeolus fasciatus
- Epeolus flavociliatus
- Epeolus intermedius
- Epeolus productulus
- Epeolus siculus
- Epeolus sigillatus
- Epeolus transitorius
- Eucera codinai
- Eucera quilisi
- Habropoda ezonata
- Melecta canariensis
- Melecta caroli
- Melecta curvispina
- Melecta gracilipes
- Nomada alpigena
- Nomada ariasi
- Nomada arrogans
- Nomada barcelonensis
- Nomada bolivari
- Nomada corcyraea
- Nomada cypricola
- Nomada gransassoi
- Nomada gredosiana
- Nomada gruenwaldti
- Nomada hispanica
- Nomada illustris
- Nomada jaramense
- Nomada kornosica
- Nomada kriesteni
- Nomada lamellata
- Nomada mandibularis
- Nomada nesiotica
- Nomada orbitalis
- Nomada polemediana
- Nomada rubricoxa
- Nomada rufoabdominalis
- Nomada sicula
- Nomada standfussi
- Nomada verna
- Tetraloniella hohmanni
- Tetraloniella lanzarotensis
- Tetraloniella lyncea
- Thyreus hohmanni

=== Halictids ===
- Dufourea coeruleocephala
- Dufourea fortunata
- Dufourea iris
- Dufourea longiglossa
- Dufourea lusitanica
- Dufourea merceti
- Dufourea styx
- Dufourea trautmanni
- Halictus centaureae
- Halictus crenicornis
- Halictus fumatipennis
- Halictus gruenwaldti
- Halictus holomelaenus
- Halictus inpilosus
- Halictus jaramielicus
- Halictus lussinicus
- Halictus mediterranellus
- Halictus nicosiae
- Halictus ponticus
- Halictus pseudotetrazonius
- Halictus pyrenaeus
- Halictus quadripartitus
- Halictus rossicus
- Halictus tridivisus
- Lasioglossum akroundicum
- Lasioglossum ariadne
- Lasioglossum aureimontanum
- Lasioglossum castilianum
- Lasioglossum corsicanum
- Lasioglossum danuvium
- Lasioglossum dusmeti
- Lasioglossum eurasicum
- Lasioglossum ibericum
- Lasioglossum kotschyi
- Lasioglossum leucomontanum
- Lasioglossum lissonotum
- Lasioglossum orihuelicum
- Lasioglossum pleurospeculum
- Lasioglossum ragusanum
- Lasioglossum tauricum
- Lasioglossum vergilianum
- Rhophitoides epiroticus
- Rophites hellenicus
- Rophites thracius
- Sphecodes atlanticus
- Sphecodes combai
- Sphecodes creticus
- Sphecodes cypricus
- Sphecodes gomerensis
- Sphecodes larochei
- Sphecodes piceohirtus
- Sphecodes pseudocrassus
- Sphecodes rubripes

=== Andrenids ===
- Andrena afrensis
- Andrena astrella
- Andrena barbareae
- Andrena batava
- Andrena bayona
- Andrena bucephala
- Andrena cervina
- Andrena chalcogastra
- Andrena chelma
- Andrena corssubalpina
- Andrena curtula
- Andrena curvana
- Andrena cypricola
- Andrena damara
- Andrena dinizi
- Andrena dourada
- Andrena ebmerella
- Andrena elata
- Andrena espanola
- Andrena farinosa
- Andrena fimbriata
- Andrena freygessneri
- Andrena fria
- Tawny mining bee (Andrena fulva)
- Andrena fulvata
- Andrena funerea
- Andrena graecella
- Andrena gredana
- Andrena grossella
- Andrena helenica
- Andrena hillana
- Andrena illyrica
- Andrena korleviciana
- Andrena kornosica
- Andrena lineolata
- Andrena lonicera
- Andrena montana
- Andrena montarca
- Andrena murana
- Andrena muscaria
- Andrena nebularia
- Andrena neovirida
- Andrena nilotica
- Andrena nitidula
- Andrena notata
- Andrena olympica
- Andrena pareklisiae
- Andrena pastellensis
- Andrena pauxilla
- Andrena pellucens
- Andrena pelopa
- Andrena relata
- Andrena resoluta
- Andrena rhenana
- Andrena roseipes
- Andrena sagittaria
- Andrena sandanskia
- Andrena semilaevis
- Andrena sibthorpi
- Andrena siciliana
- Andrena solenopalpa
- Andrena standfussorum
- Andrena suerinensis
- Andrena taxana
- Andrena tricuspidata
- Andrena trikalensis
- Andrena vacella
- Camptopoeum nasutum
- Flavipanurgus fuzetus
- Flavipanurgus merceti
- Panurginus alpinus
- Panurginus annulatus
- Panurginus montanus
- Panurginus schwarzi
- Panurginus sericatus
- Panurginus tyrolensis
- Panurgus corsicus
- Panurgus siculus
- Simpanurgus phyllopodus

=== Megachilids ===
- Chelostoma grande
- Chelostoma hellenicum
- Chelostoma laticaudum
- Chelostoma siciliae
- Dioxys atlantica
- Dioxys lanzarotensis
- Hoplitis albatera
- Hoplitis cretaea
- Hoplitis fabrei
- Hoplitis graeca
- Hoplitis hilbera
- Hoplitis holmboei
- Hoplitis lithodorae
- Hoplitis manuelae
- Hoplitis parnesica
- Hoplitis peniculifera
- Hoplitis tenuispina
- Hoplitis tkalcuella
- Hoplitis zandeni
- Megachile alpicola
- Megachile apennina
- Megachile baetica
- Megachile benoisti
- Megachile binominata
- Megachile bioculata
- Megachile breviceps
- Megachile canariensis
- Megachile canescens
- Megachile cressa
- Megachile dacica
- Megachile fuerteventurae
- Megachile ghilianii
- Megachile giraudi
- Megachile gothalauniensis
- Megachile hohmanni
- Megachile hungarica
- Megachile lucidifrons
- Megachile mavromoustakisi
- Megachile opacifrons
- Megachile pugillatoria
- Megachile punctatissima
- Megachile pusilla
- Megachile rhodosiaca
- Megachile roeweri
- Megachile rufescens
- Megachile semicircularis
- Megachile semipleta
- Megachile troodica
- Osmia ariadne
- Osmia balearica
- Osmia dusmeti
- Osmia iberica
- Osmia larochei
- Osmia madeirensis
- Osmia mirhiji
- Osmia moreensis
- Osmia palmae
- Osmia picena
- Osmia steinmanni
- Osmia svenssoni
- Protosmia asensioi
- Protosmia capitata
- Protosmia minutula
- Pseudoanthidium canariense
- Stelis franconica
- Stelis ortizi

== Mantises ==
- Betancurian dwarf mantis (Pseudoyersinia betancuriae)
- Hairy legged dwarf mantis (Pseudoyersinia pilipes)
- Teydean dwarf mantis (Pseudoyersinia teydeana)

== Lepidoptera ==
Lepidoptera comprises moths and butterflies. There are 87 species in the order Lepidoptera assessed as data deficient.

=== Pyralids ===
- ʻOhe hedyleptan moth (Omiodes asaphombra)
- Omiodes continuatalis
- Oahu Swamp hedyleptan moth (Omiodes epicentra)
- Olaʻa banana hedyleptan moth (Omiodes euryprora)
- Fullaway's banana hedyleptan moth (Omiodes fullawayi)
- Laysan hedyleptan moth (Omiodes laysanensis)
- Meyrick's banana hedyleptan moth (Omiodes meyricki)
- Maui banana hedyleptan moth (Omiodes musicola)
- Telegraphic hedyleptan moth (Omiodes telegrapha)

=== Swallowtail butterflies ===
- Losaria palu (Atrophaneura palu)
- Mansfield's three-tailed swallowtail (Bhutanitis mansfieldi)
- Graphium aurivilliusi
- Chinese luehdorfia (Luehdorfia chinensis)
- Tithonus birdwing (Ornithoptera tithonus)
- African giant swallowtail (Papilio antimachus)
- Scarce Haitian swallowtail (Papilio aristor)
- Poey's black swallowtail (Papilio caiguanabus)
- Papilio garleppi
- Papilio maroni
- Madagascan emperor swallowtail (Papilio morondavana)
- Parides coelus
- Hahnel's Amazonian swallowtail (Parides hahneli)
- Parides klagesi
- Parides pizarro
- Parides steinbachi
- Golden kaiserihind (Teinopalpus aureus)

=== Lycaenids ===
- Mullin's copper (Aloeides mullini)
- Donzel's silver-line (Apharitis zohra)
- Steely argus (Aricia bassoni)
- St. Leger's epitola (Cerautola legeri)
- Salvatore's ciliate blue (Cupidesthes salvatoris)
- Deudorix loxias
- Schmitt's eresina (Eresina schmitti)
- Eresiomera ouesso
- Green tiger blue (Hewitsonia beryllina)
- Caroline's sapphire (Iolaus carolinae)
- Fouta Djalon sapphire (Iolaus djaloni)
- Likpe sapphire (Iolaus likpe)
- Newport's sapphire (Iolaus newporti)
- Lachnocnema riftensis
- Lepidochrysops delicata
- Pennington's blue (Lepidochrysops penningtoni)
- Leptomyrina sudanica
- Micropentila bunyoro
- Ornipholidotos francisci
- Ornipholidotos ghesquierei
- Ornipholidotos goodgerae
- Ornipholidotos nancy
- Martin's blue (Plebejus martini)
- Poecilmitis pan
- Cilician blue (Polyommatus cilicius)
- Polyommatus eleniae
- Lebanon blue (Polyommatus ellisoni)
- Polyommatus isauricoides
- Lebanon beautiful blue (Polyommatus larseni)
- Polyommatus pljushtchi
- Kocak's blue (Polyommatus sertavulensis)
- Lebanese adonis blue (Polyommatus syriacus)
- Pseudaletis arrhon
- Ducarme's fantasy (Pseudaletis ducarmei)
- Melissa's fantasy (Pseudaletis melissae)
- Sardinian blue (Pseudophilotes barbagiae)
- Jordan blue (Pseudophilotes jordanicus)
- Kigoma telipna (Telipna kigoma)
- Dondo buff (Teriomima williami)
- Thermoniphas stempfferi
- Toxochitona ankole

=== Nymphalids ===
- Dark giant grayling (Berberia lambessanus)
- Plantrou's forester (Euphaedra plantroui)
- Scarce fritillary (Euphydryas maturna)
- Algerian grayling (Hipparchia ellena)
- Mycalesis tilmara
- Neptis vingerhoedti
- False meadow brown (Pyronia janiroides)
- Tirumala alba

=== Skippers ===
- Eight-spotted skipper (Dalla octomaculata)
- Algerian grizzled skipper (Muschampia leuzeae)
- Barbary skipper (Muschampia mohammed)
- Aladag skipper (Pyrgus aladaghensis)
- Bolkar skipper (Pyrgus bolkariensis)

=== Other Lepidoptera species ===
- Eriogaster catax
- Algerian dappled white (Euchloe pechi)
- Spanish moon moth (Graellsia isabelae)
- Hyles hippophaes
- Mylothris polychroma
- Willowherb hawkmoth (Proserpinus proserpina)
- Hawaiian hopseed looper moth (Scotorythra paratactis)

== Beetles ==
There are 377 beetle species assessed as data deficient.

=== Geotrupids ===
- Allotrypes mandibularis
- Ceratophyus maghrebinicus
- Ceratophyus schaffrathi
- Lethrus macrognathus
- Lethrus rotundicollis
- Thorectes asperifrons
- Thorectes demoflysi
- Thorectes juengeri
- Thorectes latus
- Thorectes reflexus
- Thorectes trituberculatus
- Trypocopris amedei

=== Longhorn beetles ===
- Axinopalpis barbarae
- Chlorophorus aegyptiacus
- Lioderina linearis
- Procallimus egregius
- Pseudosphegesthes cinerea
- Purpuricenus globulicollis
- Purpuricenus graecus
- Stenopterus similatus

=== Click beetles ===
- Agriotes passosi
- Alestrus dolosus
- Ampedus balcanicus
- Ampedus boquilobensis
- Ampedus bouweri
- Ampedus callegarii
- Ampedus francolinus
- Ampedus fuentei
- Ampedus gallicus
- Ampedus hispanicus
- Ampedus impressicollis
- Ampedus karneri
- Ampedus karpathicus
- Ampedus koschwitzi
- Ampedus macedonicus
- Ampedus magistrettii
- Ampedus melanurus
- Ampedus minos
- Ampedus pooti
- Ampedus pyrenaeus
- Ampedus rugosus
- Ampedus talamellii
- Ampedus vandalitiae
- Ampedus ziegleri
- Athous mendesi
- Athous recaldei
- Athous schurmanni
- Athous strictus
- Athous zuzartei
- Brachygonus campadellii
- Cardiophorus widenfalki
- Denticollis interpositus
- Haterumelater schembrii
- Haterumelater tauricola
- Porthmidius gelineki
- Procraerus cretensis
- Stenagostus laufferi
- Stenagostus sardiniensis

=== Erotylids ===
- Triplax andreinii
- Triplax carpathica
- Triplax cyanescens
- Triplax pygmaea
- Triplax rudis
- Triplax tergestana

=== Scarabaeids ===
- Afrodrepanus marshalli
- Aganocrossus vejdovskyi
- Agoliinus pittinoi
- Ahermodontus bischoffi
- Ahermodontus marini
- Allogymnopleurus histrio
- Alocoderus mineti
- Amietina larrochei
- Ammoecius amplicollis
- Ammoecius dogueti
- Ammoecius felscheanus
- Ammoecius naviauxi
- Ammoecius numidicus
- Ammoecius rugifrons
- Ammoecius satanas
- Anisocanthon pygmaeus
- Anomiopus ataenioides
- Anomiopus birai
- Anomiopus caputipilus
- Anomiopus gracilis
- Anomiopus howdeni
- Anomiopus idei
- Anomiopus lacordairei
- Anomiopus laetus
- Anomiopus pictus
- Anomiopus soledari
- Anomius antii
- Anomius hamricola
- Anomius neidae
- Anomius theryi
- Ateuchus contractus
- Ateuchus ecuadorensis
- Ateuchus euchalceus
- Ateuchus laevicollis
- Ateuchus romani
- Bdelyrus apaporisae
- Bdelyrus boliviensis
- Bdelyrus cochabambae
- Bdelyrus grandis
- Bdelyrus iquitosensis
- Bdelyrus leptomerus
- Bdelyrus metaensis
- Bdelyrus paraensis
- Bdelyrus triangulus
- Bodilus marani
- Byrrhidium convexum
- Caccobius croceocinctus
- Canthidium abbreviatum
- Canthidium angulicolle
- Canthidium aterrimum
- Canthidium atomarium
- Canthidium aurichalceum
- Canthidium calidum
- Canthidium coerulescens
- Canthidium deplanatum
- Canthidium erythropterum
- Canthidium flabellatum
- Canthidium flavicorne
- Canthidium flavipes
- Canthidium flavum
- Canthidium glabricolle
- Canthidium haagi
- Canthidium luteum
- Canthidium magnum
- Canthidium metallicum
- Canthidium nitidum
- Canthidium opacum
- Canthidium subdopuncticolle
- Canthidium viridicolle
- Canthidium viridiobscurum
- Canthon brunnipennis
- Canthon coloratus
- Canthon columbianus
- Canthon corruscans
- Canthon divinator
- Canthon formosus
- Canthon gemellatus
- Canthon helleri
- Canthon plagiatus
- Canthon sericatus
- Canthon simulans
- Canthon vulcanoae
- Canthonella instriata
- Catharsius bradshawi
- Catharsius brittoni
- Catharsius rhinoceros
- Cheironitis indicus
- Chilothorax brancoi
- Chilothorax discedens
- Chilothorax equitis
- Chilothorax fritschi
- Chilothorax hucklesbyi
- Chilothorax mossulensis
- Copris amabilis
- Copris capensis
- Copris complexus
- Copris fallax
- Copris morphaeus
- Copris ritsemae
- Copris serius
- Copris victorini
- Copris wiesei
- Coproecus hemisphaericus
- Coprophanaeus rigoutorum
- Coprophanaeus terrali
- Coptorhina nitefacta
- Cryptocanthon medinae
- Cryptocanthon otonga
- Deltochilum cristinae
- Deltochilum violetae
- Deltorrhinum batesi
- Demarziella eungella
- Demarziella planitarsis
- Demarziella storeyi
- Demarziella tropicalis
- Dendropaemon crenatostriatus
- Dendropaemon tenuitarsis
- Diastellopalpus thomsoni
- Dichotomius alyattes
- Dichotomius dahli
- Dichotomius fallax
- Dichotomius horridus
- Dichotomius nutans
- Dichotomius problematicus
- Epirinus asper
- Epirinus comosus
- Epirinus relictus
- Epirinus sulcipennis
- Esymus alkani
- Esymus filitarsis
- Esymus fumigatulus
- Esymus ornatulus
- Esymus sicardi
- Euheptaulacus nemethi
- Euoniticellus perniger
- Euonthophagus maindroni
- Euorodalus elephanthinus
- Euorodalus longevittatus
- Frankenbergerius forcipatus
- Frankenbergerius nitidus
- Frankenbergerius opacus
- Grandinaphodius inferorum
- Grandinaphodius smoliki
- Gymnopleurus aeruginosus
- Gymnopleurus bicolor
- Gymnopleurus thelwalli
- Heptaulacus algarbiensis
- Heptaulacus pirazzolii
- Heptaulacus syrticola
- Ixodina freyi
- Kolbeellus ateuchoides
- Lepanus gelasinus
- Lepanus pisoniae
- Liatongus urus
- Limarus hirtipennis
- Liothorax isikdagensis
- Macroderes cornutus
- Mecynodes anemurensis
- Mecynodes angulosus
- Mecynodes trochilus
- Megalonitis bohemani
- Melinopterus abeillei
- Melinopterus sertavulensis
- Mendidaphodius palaestinensis
- Mendidius calliger
- Metacatharsius transvaalensis
- Namakwanus streyi
- Neagolius heydeni
- Neosisyphus kuhni
- Nimbus harpagonis
- Nimbus libanonensis
- Nobiellus bonnairei
- Nobius rhodiensis
- Odontoloma obscurum
- Oniticellus pseudoplanatus
- Onitis adelphus
- Onitis aeruginosus
- Onitis dispar
- Onitis ezechias
- Onitis keniensis
- Onitis kingstoni
- Onitis meyeri
- Onitis mniszechi
- Onitis monstrosus
- Onitis nemoralis
- Onitis parainflaticollis
- Onitis parvulus
- Onitis retrodentatus
- Onitis tanzaniensis
- Ontherus androgynus
- Onthophagus adelaidae
- Onthophagus alquirta
- Onthophagus amphioxus
- Onthophagus anatolicus
- Onthophagus arai
- Onthophagus azusae
- Onthophagus babaulti
- Onthophagus beesoni
- Onthophagus bicolensis
- Onthophagus bindaree
- Onthophagus bonsae
- Onthophagus bytinskii
- Onthophagus caesariatus
- Onthophagus caprai
- Onthophagus carinulatus
- Onthophagus cavia
- Onthophagus circulator
- Onthophagus citreum
- Onthophagus compressus
- Onthophagus depilatus
- Onthophagus diversiformis
- Onthophagus eschscholtzi
- Onthophagus falculatus
- Onthophagus ferrari
- Onthophagus gajo
- Onthophagus hageni
- Onthophagus hemipygus
- Onthophagus hildebrandti
- Onthophagus histeriformis
- Onthophagus hyalcyon
- Onthophagus iyengari
- Onthophagus kanarensis
- Onthophagus kangeanus
- Onthophagus kirki
- Onthophagus kyleensis
- Onthophagus lamgalio
- Onthophagus massai
- Onthophagus nagpurensis
- Onthophagus nefarius
- Onthophagus numidicus
- Onthophagus planifrons
- Onthophagus praedatus
- Onthophagus pseudovirens
- Onthophagus rhinocerus
- Onthophagus rugosicollis
- Onthophagus rugulipennis
- Onthophagus sikkimensis
- Onthophagus spathatus
- Onthophagus strabo
- Onthophagus suermelii
- Onthophagus surdus
- Onthophagus tricolor
- Onthophagus trigibber
- Onthophagus vilis
- Onthophagus yiryoront
- Osmanius dellacasai
- Panelus bakeri
- Paracoptochirus kozanensis
- Paracoptochirus petrovitzi
- Paracoptochirus singularis
- Paracoptochirus vignai
- Parammoecius amanicus
- Paraphytus africanus
- Paraphytus foveatus
- Pedaria granulosa
- Pedaria hanae
- Pedaria insularis
- Pedaria morettoi
- Pedaria ovata
- Pedaria spinithorax
- Pedaria tibialis
- Phaeaphodius fusculus
- Plagiogonus nanoides
- Proagoderus biarmatus
- Proagoderus brucei
- Proagoderus plato
- Proagoderus versus
- Pseudacrossus sharpi
- Pseudacrossus wewalkai
- Pseudacrossus zurcheri
- Pseudochironitis stuhlmanni
- Scarabaeus asceticus
- Scarabaeus augias
- Scarabaeus caffer
- Scarabaeus canaliculatus
- Scarabaeus ebenus
- Scarabaeus gagates
- Scarabaeus ritchiei
- Scarabaeus rixosus
- Scarabaeus xavieri
- Scatimus onorei
- Scatimus pacificus
- Scatonomus lauropalui
- Scatonomus xanthopygus
- Scybalocanthon nigellus
- Sulcophanaeus actaeon
- Sulcophanaeus columbi
- Sylvicanthon obscurus
- Tesserodon feehani
- Tesserodon pilicrepus
- Tesserodoniella elguetai
- Thyregis relictus
- Thyregis tarsatus
- Tomogonus crassoides
- Trichillum cordobense
- Uroxys angulicollis
- Uroxys catharinensis
- Uroxys latesulcatus
- Uroxys lojanus
- Uroxys monstrosus
- Uroxys pygmaeus
- Uroxys rugatus
- Zonocopris machadoi

=== Other beetle species ===
- Ancyrona japonica
- Clypeorhagus clypeatus
- Hylis slipinskii
- Microrhagus hummleri
- Mycetophagus tauricus
- Pediacus tabellatus
- Protaetia sardea
- Tenebroides fuscus
- Thambus frivaldskyi
- Thymalus oblongus

== Odonata ==
Odonata includes dragonflies and damselflies. There are 868 species in the order Odonata assessed as data deficient.

=== Platystictids ===
- Drepanosticta attala
- Drepanosticta berlandi
- Drepanosticta conica
- Drepanosticta exoleta
- Drepanosticta hamadryas
- Drepanosticta jurzitzai
- Drepanosticta khaochongensis
- Drepanosticta kruegeri
- Drepanosticta lepyricollis
- Drepanosticta luzonica
- Drepanosticta palauensis
- Drepanosticta pan
- Drepanosticta polychromatica
- Drepanosticta sharpi
- Drepanosticta spatulifera
- Drepanosticta sundana
- Drepanosticta tenella
- Drepanosticta vietnamica
- Drepanosticta viridis
- Wall's shadowdamsel (Drepanosticta walli)
- Palaemnema apicalis
- Palaemnema azupizui
- Palaemnema bilobulata
- Palaemnema brucei
- Palaemnema carmelita
- Palaemnema cyclohamulata
- Palaemnema lorena
- Palaemnema martini
- Palaemnema peruviana
- Palaemnema spinulata
- Protosticta antelopoides
- Protosticta caroli
- Protosticta feronia
- Protosticta fraseri
- Protosticta hearseyi
- Protosticta himalaica
- Protosticta robusta
- Protosticta satoi
- Protosticta trilobata
- Protosticta uncata
- Protosticta versicolor
- Protosticta zhengi

=== Chlorogomphids ===
- Chlorogomphus albomarginatus
- Chlorogomphus daviesi
- Chlorogomphus fraseri
- Chlorogomphus kitawakii
- Chlorogomphus magnificus
- Chlorogomphus miyashitai
- Chlorogomphus montanus
- Chlorogomphus mortoni
- Chlorogomphus preciosus
- Chlorogomphus sachiyoae
- Chlorogomphus schmidti
- Chlorogomphus shanicus
- Chlorogomphus speciosus
- Chlorogomphus takakuwai
- Chlorogomphus vietnamensis
- Chlorogomphus yokoii
- Chloropetalia owadai
- Chloropetalia soarer
- Watanabeopetalia usignata

=== Argiolestids ===
- Argiolestes alfurus
- Argiolestes connectens
- Argiolestes kirbyi
- Argiolestes luteipes
- Argiolestes saltuarius
- Argiolestes simplex
- Argiolestes tenuispinus
- Argiolestes tristis
- Barrington flatwing (Austroargiolestes brookhousei)
- Caledargiolestes janiceae
- Turquoise flatwing (Griseargiolestes bucki)
- Nesolestes drocera
- Nesolestes mariae
- Nesolestes martini
- Nesolestes pauliani
- Nesolestes ranavalona
- Nesolestes tuberculicollis
- Podolestes coomansi
- Podopteryx casuarina

=== Chlorocyphids ===
- Calocypha laidlawi
- Congo red jewel (Chlorocypha ghesquierei)
- Sunset jewel (Chlorocypha helenae)
- Dull jewel (Chlorocypha neptunus)
- Red-bellied jewel (Chlorocypha rubriventris)
- Indocypha katharina
- Indocypha silbergliedi
- Lucifer jewel (Platycypha eliseva)
- Petite jewel (Platycypha picta)
- Rhinocypha cuneata
- Rhinocypha fulgipennis
- Rhinocypha hilaryae
- Rhinocypha liberata
- Rhinocypha seducta
- Rhinocypha trimaculata
- Rhinocypha vitrinella
- Rhinoneura caerulea

=== Isostictids ===
- Queensland pin (Eurysticta reevesi)
- Selysioneura arboricola
- Selysioneura bacillus
- Selysioneura rhaphia
- Selysioneura virgula
- Titanosticta macrogaster

=== Platycnemidids ===
- Allocnemis eisentrauti
- Gabon yellowwing (Allocnemis interrupta)
- Caconeura gomphoides
- Caconeura ramburi
- Caconeura risi
- Caconeura t-coerulea
- Calicnemia chaoi
- Calicnemia haksik
- Calicnemia mukherjeei
- Calicnemia sudhaae
- Calicnemia uenoi
- Coeliccia acco
- Coeliccia borneensis
- Coeliccia brachysticta
- Coeliccia dorothea
- Coeliccia erici
- Coeliccia furcata
- Coeliccia hoanglienensis
- Coeliccia kimurai
- Coeliccia loringae
- Coeliccia macrostigma
- Coeliccia megumii
- Coeliccia mingxiensis
- Coeliccia montana
- Coeliccia nigrescens
- Coeliccia onoi
- Coeliccia pracritii
- Coeliccia pyriformis
- Coeliccia rossi
- Coeliccia rotundata
- Coeliccia sarbottama
- Coeliccia satoi
- Coeliccia schmidti
- Coeliccia svihleri
- Coeliccia tomokunii
- Coeliccia uenoi
- Coeliccia vacca
- Copera superplatypes
- Cyanocnemis aureofrons
- Elattoneura campioni
- Mealy threadtail (Elattoneura morini)
- Elattoneura nigerrima
- Elattoneura nihari
- Guinea threadtail (Elattoneura perisi)
- Elattoneura souteri
- Esme cyaneovittata
- Esme mudiensis
- Idiocnemis fissidens
- Idiocnemis huonensis
- Indocnemis ambigua
- Lieftinckia ramosa
- Congo riverjack (Mesocnemis saralisa)
- Metacnemis secundaris
- Nososticta evelynae
- Nososticta finisterra
- Spot-winged threadtail (Nososticta kalumburu)
- Koolpinyah threadtail (Nososticta koolpinyah)
- Nososticta nigrifrons
- Nososticta wallacii
- Platycnemis hova
- Platycnemis longiventris
- Phantom featherleg (Platycnemis phasmovolans)
- Platycnemis pseudalatipes
- Prodasineura abbreviata
- Prodasineura doisuthepensis
- Prodasineura flammula
- Prodasineura flavifacies
- Prodasineura odoneli
- Prodasineura peramoena
- Rhyacocnemis leonorae
- Rhyacocnemis prothoracica

=== Megapodagrionids ===
- Allopodagrion erinys
- Archaeopodagrion bilobatum
- Arrhenocnemis amphidactylis
- Bornargiolestes nigra
- Burmargiolestes laidlawi
- Heteragrion dorsale
- Heteragrion flavidorsum
- Heteragrion melanurum
- Heteragrion triangulare
- Philogenia berenice
- Philogenia compressa
- Philogenia ebona
- Philogenia iquita
- Philogenia peruviana
- Philogenia raphaella
- Philogenia schmidti
- Philogenia sucra
- Philogenia umbrosa
- Philosina buchi
- Priscagrion kiautai
- Protolestes furcatus
- Protolestes kerckhoffae
- Rhinagrion tricolor
- Rhipidolestes alleni
- Rhipidolestes bastiaani
- Rhipidolestes chaoi
- Rhipidolestes malaisei
- Rhipidolestes pallidistigma
- Rhipidolestes rubripes
- Tatocnemis crenulatipennis
- Tatocnemis virginiae
- Teinopodagrion muzanum
- Teinopodagrion turikum
- Teinopodagrion vilorianum
- Teinopodagrion waynu

=== Gomphids ===
- Acrogomphus fraseri
- Amphigomphus somnuki
- Anisogomphus caudalis
- Anisogomphus forresti
- Anisogomphus fujianensis
- Anisogomphus nitidus
- Anisogomphus orites
- Anisogomphus pinratani
- Anisogomphus vulvalis
- Anisogomphus yunnanensis
- Aphylla barbata
- Aphylla robusta
- Aphylla silvatica
- Aphylla spinula
- Asiagomphus auricolor
- Asiagomphus corniger
- Asiagomphus gongshanensis
- Asiagomphus melanopsoides
- Asiagomphus nilgiricus
- Asiagomphus odoneli
- Asiagomphus pacatus
- Asiagomphus somnolens
- Asiagomphus xanthenatus
- Murray river hunter (Austrogomphus angelorum)
- Black vicetail (Austrogomphus atratus)
- Northern river hunter (Austrogomphus doddi)
- Tiny hunter (Austrogomphus pusillus)
- Burmagomphus arboreus
- Burmagomphus arthuri
- Burmagomphus cauvericus
- Burmagomphus hasimaricus
- Burmagomphus insolitus
- Burmagomphus johnseni
- Burmagomphus laidlawi
- Burmagomphus minusculus
- Burmagomphus v-flavum
- Cornigomphus guineensis
- Cornigomphus mariannae
- Cyclogomphus heterostylus
- Cyclogomphus wilkinsi
- Syrandiri clubtail (Davidioides martini)
- Davidius baronii
- Davidius chaoi
- Davidius kumaonensis
- Davidius malloryi
- Davidius monastyrskii
- Davidius squarrosus
- Davidius trox
- Davidius yuanbaensis
- Davidius zallorensis
- Davidius zhoui
- Dubitogomphus bidentatus
- Ebegomphus schroederi
- Epigomphus compactus
- West Mexican knobtail (Epigomphus crepidus)
- Epigomphus gibberosus
- Epigomphus llama
- Epigomphus occipitalis
- Epigomphus pechumani
- Erpetogomphus erici
- Dashed ringtail (Erpetogomphus heterodon)
- Erpetogomphus leptophis
- Gomphidia fletcheri
- Gomphidia kodaguensis
- Gomphidia leonorae
- Gomphidia williamsoni
- Gomphus amseli
- Tamaulipan clubtail (Gomphus gonzalezi)
- Gomphus kinzelbachi
- Syrian clubtail (Gomphus ubadschii)
- Heliogomphus cervus
- Heliogomphus chaoi
- Heliogomphus kalarensis
- Heliogomphus spirillus
- Heliogomphus svihleri
- Ictinogomphus celebensis
- Ictinogomphus distinctus
- Ictinogomphus kishori
- Idiogomphoides emmeli
- Isomma elouardi
- Lamelligomphus laetus
- Lamelligomphus parvulus
- Leptogomphus baolocensis
- Leptogomphus inclitus
- Leptogomphus intermedius
- Leptogomphus pasia
- Leptogomphus uenoi
- Lestinogomphus africanus
- Lestinogomphus bivittatus
- Lestinogomphus minutus
- Lestinogomphus silkeae
- Bwamba horntail (Libyogomphus bwambae)
- Western horntail (Libyogomphus christinae)
- Gabon horntail (Libyogomphus emiliae)
- Cameroon horntail (Libyogomphus mamfei)
- Macrogomphus annulatus
- Macrogomphus borikhanensis
- Macrogomphus decemlineatus
- Macrogomphus kerri
- Macrogomphus matsukii
- Macrogomphus montanus
- Macrogomphus rivularis
- Macrogomphus robustus
- Macrogomphus seductus
- Macrogomphus thoracicus
- Macrogomphus wynaadicus
- Mastigogomphus pinheyi
- Megalogomphus bicornutus
- Megalogomphus cochinchinensis
- Megalogomphus flavicolor
- Megalogomphus icterops
- Megalogomphus smithii
- Megalogomphus superbus
- Melligomphus cataractus
- Melligomphus dolus
- Merogomphus chaoi
- Merogomphus longistigma
- Merogomphus tamdaoensis
- Merogomphus vespertinus
- Microgomphus jurzitzai
- Microgomphus lilliputians
- Microgomphus loogali
- Microgomphus torquatus
- Microgomphus verticalis
- Mitragomphus ganzanus
- Neurogomphus agilis
- Neurogomphus angustisigna
- Neurogomphus carlcooki
- Kocytos siphontail (Neurogomphus cocytius)
- Neurogomphus paenuelensis
- Neurogomphus vicinus
- Nihonogomphus indicus
- Nihonogomphus montanus
- Nihonogomphus pulcherrimus
- Nihonogomphus schorri
- Nihonogomphus semanticus
- Nihonogomphus shaowuensis
- Nihonogomphus simillimus
- Yellow-fronted longleg (Notogomphus flavifrons)
- Notogomphus maryae
- Onychogomphus acinaces
- Onychogomphus annularis
- Onychogomphus banteng
- Onychogomphus cacharicus
- Onychogomphus castor
- Onychogomphus cerastis
- Onychogomphus geometricus
- Onychogomphus grammicus
- Onychogomphus kerri
- Onychogomphus kitchingmani
- Onychogomphus maclachlani
- Onychogomphus maculivertex
- Onychogomphus malabarensis
- Onychogomphus meghalayanus
- Intermediate claspertail (Onychogomphus nigrotibialis)
- Onychogomphus pilosus
- Onychogomphus rappardi
- Onychogomphus risi
- Onychogomphus rossii
- Onychogomphus saundersii
- Onychogomphus striatus
- Ophiogomphus sinicus
- Orientogomphus circularis
- Orientogomphus earnshawi
- Orientogomphus naninus
- Paragomphus aureatus
- Ethiopian hooktail (Paragomphus crenigomphoides)
- Paragomphus echinoccipitalis
- Paragomphus frontalis
- Paragomphus hoffmanni
- Paragomphus interruptus
- Kiauta's hooktail (Paragomphus kiautai)
- Paragomphus lindgreni
- Forest hooktail (Paragomphus machadoi)
- Paragomphus maynei
- Paragomphus risi
- Tournier's hooktail (Paragomphus tournieri)
- Paragomphus zambeziensis
- Perigomphus angularis
- Phaenandrogomphus aureus
- Phaenandrogomphus dingavani
- Phaenandrogomphus yunnanensis
- Phyllocycla baria
- Phyllocycla gladiata
- Malkin's forceptail (Phyllocycla malkini)
- Phyllocycla pallida
- Phyllocycla sordida
- Phyllogomphoides aculeus
- Phyllogomphoides camposi
- Phyllogomphoides indicatrix
- Phyllogomphoides litoralis
- Phyllogomphoides pseudangularis
- Phyllogomphoides pseudoundulatus
- Phyllogomphoides singularis
- Phyllogomphoides suspectus
- Phyllogomphus bartolozzii
- Phyllogomphus helenae
- Phyllogomphus occidentalis
- Platygomphus feae
- Progomphus adaptatus
- Progomphus amarillus
- Progomphus amazonicus
- Progomphus angeloi
- Progomphus conjectus
- Progomphus delicatus
- Progomphus maculatus
- Progomphus nervis
- Progomphus nigellus
- Progomphus occidentalis
- Progomphus recurvatus
- Hispaniolan sanddragon (Progomphus serenus)
- Progomphus tantillus
- Scalmogomphus guizhouensis
- Scalmogomphus wenshanensis
- Small dragonhunter (Sieboldius alexanderi)
- Sieboldius gigas
- Sieboldius nigricolor
- Sinogomphus scissus
- Sinogomphus telamon
- Stylogomphus changi
- Stylogomphus tantulus
- Stylurus endicotti
- Stylurus flavicornis
- Stylurus gideon
- Stylurus takashii
- Pinhey's horntail (Tragogomphus ellioti)
- Trigomphus yunnanensis
- Zonophora regalis

=== Cordulegastrids ===
- Anotogaster basalis
- Anotogaster chaoi
- Anotogaster flaveola
- Anotogaster gigantica
- Anotogaster klossi
- Anotogaster sakaii
- Cordulegaster annandalei
- Cordulegaster lunifera
- Cordulegaster vanbrinkae
- Neallogaster schmidti

=== Corduliids ===
- Aeschnosoma rustica
- Hemicordulia hilbrandi
- Hemicordulia mumfordi
- Hemicordulia oceanica
- Libellulosoma minuta
- Navicordulia amazonica
- Navicordulia atlantica
- Broad-tailed shadowdragon (Neurocordulia michaeli)
- Procordulia asahinai
- Somatochlora daviesi
- Somatochlora georgiana
- Treeline emerald (Somatochlora sahlbergi)
- Robust baskettail (Tetragoneuria spinosa)

=== Calopterygids ===
- Caliphaea thailandica
- Calopteryx laosica
- Calopteryx oberthuri
- Hetaerina gallardi
- Hetaerina indeprensa
- Hetaerina mendezi
- Mnais icteroptera
- Mnesarete marginata
- Mnesarete mariana
- Mnesarete smaragdina
- Noguchiphaea mattii
- Noguchiphaea yoshikoae
- Ormenophlebia rollinati
- Smokewing (Sapho fumosa)

=== Coenagrionids ===
- Acanthagrion hartei
- Acanthallagma luteum
- Acanthallagma strohmi
- Gabon slim (Aciagrion balachowskyi)
- Yellow-winged slim (Aciagrion brosseti)
- Aciagrion huaanense
- Awl-tipped slim (Aciagrion macrootithenae)
- Cryptic slim (Aciagrion nodosum)
- Tiny slim (Aciagrion rarum)
- Zambia slim (Aciagrion zambiense)
- Agriocnemis aderces
- Agriocnemis carmelita
- Agriocnemis corbeti
- Tropical wisp (Agriocnemis dobsoni)
- Amphicnemis bicolor
- Amphicnemis glauca
- Amphicnemis pandanicola
- Amphicnemis platystyla
- Argia bicellulata
- Argia fraudatricula
- Argia mishuyaca
- Malabar kino (Argia percellulata)
- Pima dancer (Argia pima)
- Argia subapicalis
- Argiocnemis solitaria
- Cercion luzonicum
- White-faced waxtail (Ceriagrion katamborae)
- Ceriagrion madagazureum
- Ceriagrion nigroflavum
- Ceriagrion nigrolineatum
- Ceriagrion oblongulum
- Ceriagrion pallidum
- Coenagrion australocaspicum
- Coenagrion persicum
- Coenagrion tengchongense
- Coenagrion vanbrinkae
- Cyanallagma angelae
- Cyanallagma ferenigrum
- Cyanallagma ovigerum
- Jamaican bromeliad damsel (Diceratobasis macrogaster)
- Hispaniolan bromeliad damsel (Diceratobasis melanogaster)
- Enallagma risi
- Epipleoneura albuquerquei
- Epipleoneura letitia
- Epipleoneura pereirai
- Epipleoneura protostictoides
- Epipleoneura tariana
- Epipleoneura uncinata
- Erythromma yunnanense
- Forcepsioneura itatiaiae
- Himalagrion exclamationis
- Himalagrion pithoragarhicum
- Hivaagrion demorsum
- Hivaagrion halecarpenteri
- Homeoura silviae
- Homeoura sobrina
- Hylaeargia magnifica
- Woodnymph damsel (Hylaeonympha magoi)
- Inpabasis hubelli
- Ischnura albistigma
- Ischnura buxtoni
- Ischnura indivisa
- Ischnura mahechai
- Ischnura rufovittata
- Tiny threadtail (Junix elumbis)
- Leptagrion acutum
- Leptagrion croceum
- Cream-tipped swampdamsel (Leptobasis melinogaster)
- Amalia helicopter (Mecistogaster amalia)
- Mecistogaster martinezi
- Melanesobasis maculosa
- Mesamphiagrion dunklei
- Mesamphiagrion ecuatoriale
- Metaleptobasis bicornis
- Metaleptobasis brevicauda
- Metaleptobasis gabrielae
- Metaleptobasis guillermoi
- Metaleptobasis lillianae
- Metaleptobasis minteri
- Metaleptobasis panguanae
- Metaleptobasis peltata
- Metaleptobasis tetragena
- Metaleptobasis turbinata
- Mortonagrion alcyone
- Mortonagrion appendiculatum
- Sri Lanka midget (Mortonagrion ceylonicum)
- Mortonagrion varralli
- Orange-sided threadtail (Neoneura carnatica)
- Neoneura jurzitzai
- Neoneura lucas
- Cuban blue threadtail (Neoneura maria)
- Nesobasis rufostigma
- Oreiallagma prothoracicum
- Oxyagrion hermosae
- Pacificagrion dolorosum
- Palaiargia eclecta
- Palaiargia eos
- Palaiargia halcyon
- Palaiargia optata
- Palaiargia tanysiptera
- Papuagrion ekari
- Papuagrion oppositum
- Papuagrion reductum
- Papuargia stueberi
- Peristicta gauchae
- Peristicta lizeria
- Prolonged threadtail (Proneura prolongata)
- Black-fronted threadtail (Protoneura capillaris)
- Protoneura klugi
- Pseudagrion ampolomitae
- Angola sprite (Pseudagrion angolense)
- Pseudagrion apicale
- Pseudagrion azureum
- Pseudagrion cheliferum
- Pretty sprite (Pseudagrion coeruleipunctum)
- Pseudagrion coomansi
- Pseudagrion deconcertans
- Pseudagrion dundoense
- Orange-striped sprite (Pseudagrion grilloti)
- Pseudagrion hamulus
- Pseudagrion igniceps
- Pseudagrion indicum
- Pseudagrion nigripes
- Pseudagrion nigrofasciatum
- Pseudagrion renaudi
- Pseudagrion samoense
- Pseudagrion schmidtianum
- Pseudagrion spinithoracicum
- Pseudagrion tinctipenne
- Pseudagrion vakoanae
- Teinobasis argiocnemis
- Teinobasis nitescens
- Teinobasis prothoracica
- Teinobasis simulans
- Telagrion cornicauda
- Telagrion quadricolor
- Telebasis watsoni
- Thaumatagrion funereum
- Vanuatubasis malekulana
- Kauri redcoat damselfly (Xanthocnemis sobrina)

=== Euphaeids ===
- Anisopleura lieftincki
- Anisopleura trulla
- Anisopleura vallei
- Anisopleura yunnanensis
- Anisopleura zhengi
- Bayadera fasciata
- Bayadera kali
- Bayadera longicauda
- Bayadera nephelopennis
- Bayadera serrata
- Bayadera strigata
- Cryptophaea yunnanensis
- Dysphaea ethela
- Dysphaea walli
- Euphaea hirta
- Schmidtiphaea schmidi

=== Macromiids ===
- Macromia aculeata
- Macromia flavicincta
- Macromia flavovittata
- Macromia fulgidifrons
- Macromia icterica
- Macromia indica
- Macromia kiautai
- Macromia macula
- Macromia pallida
- Macromia pyramidalis
- Macromia septima
- Macromia sombui
- Macromia sophrosyne
- Macromia vangviengensis
- Rainforest cruiser (Macromia viridescens)
- Macromia yunnanensis
- Phyllomacromia girardi
- Western double-spined cruiser (Phyllomacromia lamottei)
- Phyllomacromia legrandi
- Phyllomacromia nigeriensis
- Brown-templed cruiser (Phyllomacromia occidentalis)
- Conbo double-spined cruiser (Phyllomacromia villiersi)

=== Lestids ===
- Archilestes chocoanus
- Small reedling (Indolestes alleni)
- Indolestes anomalus
- Indolestes assamicus
- Indolestes bilineatus
- Indolestes coeruleus
- Indolestes inflatus
- Indolestes pulcherrimus
- Lestes angularis
- Lestes debellardi
- Lestes garoensis
- Lestes malaisei
- Lestes nigriceps
- Algerian spreadwing (Lestes numidicus)
- Lestes silvaticus
- Lestes umbrinus
- Lestes urubamba
- Orolestes durga
- Platylestes heterostylus

=== Aeshnids ===
- Williamson's darner (Aeshna williamsoniana)
- Agyrtacantha othello
- Anaciaeschna melanostoma
- Andaeschna timotocuica
- Boyeria sinensis
- Castoraeschna coronata
- Cephalaeschna acutifrons
- Cephalaeschna aritai
- Cephalaeschna klapperichi
- Yellow-spotted dusk-hawker (Cephalaeschna klotsae)
- Cephalaeschna masoni
- Gynacantha albistyla
- Gynacantha apiaensis
- Gynacantha apicalis
- Gynacantha arnaudi
- Gynacantha arthuri
- Gynacantha bainbriggei
- Gynacantha bartai
- Gynacantha biharica
- Gynacantha burmana
- Gynacantha chelifera
- Gynacantha demeter
- Gynacantha dravida
- Gynacantha hova
- Gynacantha jessei
- Gynacantha khasiaca
- Gynacantha maclachlani
- Gynacantha odoneli
- Gynacantha phaeomeria
- Gynacantha rammohani
- Gynacantha remartinia
- Gynacantha rotundata
- Gynacantha stevensoni
- Linaeschna polli
- Neuraeschna cornuta
- Neuraeschna mayoruna
- Mina net-winged darner (Neuraeschna mina)
- Neuraeschna tapajonica
- Oligoaeschna decorata
- Oligoaeschna elacatura
- Oligoaeschna khasiana
- Oligoaeschna martini
- Oligoaeschna pramoti
- Oligoaeschna speciosa
- Oligoaeschna sumatrana
- Periaeschna lebasi
- Periaeschna unifasciata
- Petaliaeschna fletcheri
- Petaliaeschna lieftincki
- Petaliaeschna tomokunii
- Zambesi hawker (Pinheyschna moori)
- Planaeschna bachmaensis
- Planaeschna chiengmaiensis
- Planaeschna cucphuongensis
- Planaeschna nanlingensis
- Planaeschna owadai
- Planaeschna tamdaoensis
- Planaeschna tomokunii
- Planaeschna viridis
- Rhionaeschna vazquezae
- Sarasaeschna minuta
- Sarasaeschna tsaopiensis
- Tropical cascade darner (Spinaeschna watsoni)
- Staurophlebia gigantula
- Tetracanthagyna brunnea

=== Libellulids ===
- Problematic flasher (Aethiothemis gamblesi)
- Orange flasher (Aethiothemis mediofasciata)
- Agrionoptera dorothea
- Amphithemis curvistyla
- Amphithemis kerri
- Amphithemis vacillans
- Atratothemis reelsi
- Brachydiplax yunnanensis
- Brachygonia ophelia
- Brechmorhoga grenadensis
- Calophlebia interposita
- Calophlebia karschi
- Camacinia harterti
- Cannaphila mortoni
- Celebophlebia dactylogastra
- Crocothemis chaldaeorum
- Crocothemis striata
- Diplacina cyrene
- Diplacina micans
- Bromeliad dragonlet (Erythrodiplax bromeliicola)
- Erythrodiplax cauca
- Erythrodiplax diversa
- Huonia ferentina
- Huonia moerens
- Hydrobasileus vittatus
- Hylaeothemis gardeneri
- Hylaeothemis indica
- Hypothemis hageni
- Leucorrhinia circassica
- Lokia modesta
- Lyriothemis acigastra
- Lyriothemis mortoni
- Lyriothemis salva
- Macrothemis aurimaculata
- Dark leaftipper (Malgassophlebia westfalli)
- Micrathyria duplicata
- Angola micmac (Micromacromia flava)
- Nannophlebia agalma
- Nannophlebia amaryllis
- Nannophlebia buruensis
- Neodythemis arnoulti
- Powdered junglewatcher (Neodythemis fitzgeraldi)
- Bwindi junglewatcher (Neodythemis munyaga)
- Neurothemis feralis
- Neurothemis nesaea
- Canopy skimmer (Nothodiplax dendrophila)
- Oligoclada xanthopleura
- Orthemis teres
- Orthetrum borneense
- Arrow skimmer (Orthetrum sagitta)
- Palaeothemis tillyardi
- Blue rock skimmer (Paltothemis cyanosoma)
- Phyllothemis eltoni
- Mantled spiderlegs (Planiplax machadoi)
- Potamarcha puella
- Pseudagrionoptera diotima
- Pseudotramea prateri
- Rhyothemis splendens
- Risiophlebia risi
- Sympetrum chaconi
- Sympetrum daliensis
- St. Helena darter (Sympetrum dilatatum)
- Sympetrum himalayanum
- Sympetrum orientale
- Sympetrum paramo
- Tapeinothemis boharti
- Tetrathemis denticauda
- Tetrathemis flavescens
- Treefall elf (Tetrathemis fraseri)
- Tetrathemis ruwensoriensis
- Smoky dropwing (Trithemis fumosa)
- Superb dropwing (Trithemis hartwigi)
- Sombre dropwing (Trithemis osvaldae)
- Uracis reducta
- Urothemis bisignata
- St Lucia basker (Urothemis luciana)
- Viridithemis viridula
- Zygonyx ilia
- Zygonyx immaculata
- Zygonyx ranavalonae
- Zyxommoides breviventre

=== Polythorids ===
- Cora chiribiquete
- Cora confusa
- Cora dorada
- Cora dualis
- Cora modesta
- Cora munda
- Cora parda
- Euthore inlactea
- Euthore leroii
- Euthore mirabilis
- Miocora pellucida
- Polythore koepckei
- Polythore williamsoni

=== Other Odonata species ===
- Montane relict damsel (Amphipteryx agrioides)
- Oaxaca relict damsel (Amphipteryx longicaudata)
- Tropical shutwing (Cordulephya bidens)
- Devadatta glaucinota
- Devadatta multinervosa
- Red bareleg (Dicterias atrosanguinea)
- Pretty tigertail (Eusynthemis netta)
- Beech tigertail (Eusynthemis ursula)
- Idionyx corona
- Idionyx imbricata
- Idionyx minima
- Idionyx montana
- Idionyx nadganiensis
- Idionyx nilgiriensis
- Idionyx periyashola
- Idionyx saffronata
- Idionyx travancorensis
- Idionyx unguiculata
- Idionyx yunnanensis
- Jill's shadowcruiser (Idomacromia jillianae)
- Queensland swiftwing (Lathrocordulia garrisoni)
- Macromidia hangzhouensis
- Megalestes discus
- Megalestes irma
- Megalestes lieftincki
- Megalestes raychoudhurii
- Neocordulia griphus
- Neocordulia mambucabensis
- Neocordulia volxemi
- Spotwing (Neopetalia punctata)
- Nesocordulia malgassica
- Nesocordulia villiersi
- Perilestes gracillimus
- Perissolestes castor
- Philoganga loringae
- Unicorn redspot (Phyllopetalia stictica)
- Synthemis evelynae
- Synthemis flexicauda

== See also ==
- Lists of IUCN Red List data deficient species
- List of least concern insects
- List of near threatened insects
- List of vulnerable insects
- List of endangered insects
- List of critically endangered insects
- List of recently extinct insects
