= Anomiopus nigrocoeruleus =

Conservation status
- Least Concern (IUCN 3.1)

Scientific classification
- Domain: Eukaryota
- Kingdom: Animalia
- Phylum: Arthropoda
- Class: Insecta
- Order: Coleoptera
- Suborder: Polyphaga
- Infraorder: Scarabaeiformia
- Family: Scarabaeidae
- Subfamily: Scarabaeinae
- Tribe: Deltochilini
- Genus: Anomiopus
- Species: A. nigrocoeruleus

Binomial name
- Anomiopus nigrocoeruleus (Martinez, 1955)

Synonyms
- Onthocharis nigrocoerulea Martinez, 1955

Species of beetle

Anomiopus nigrocoeruleus is a species of true dung beetle that can be found in Argentina, Brazil and Paraguay. It can be found in cerrado and chaco biomes. It may be a myrmecophile.

The IUCN conservation status of Anomiopus nigrocoeruleus is "LC", least concern, with no immediate threat to the species' survival. The IUCN status was assessed in 2013.
