= Anomiopus virescens =

Conservation status
- Least Concern (IUCN 3.1)

Scientific classification
- Kingdom: Animalia
- Phylum: Arthropoda
- Class: Insecta
- Order: Coleoptera
- Suborder: Polyphaga
- Infraorder: Scarabaeiformia
- Family: Scarabaeidae
- Subfamily: Scarabaeinae
- Tribe: Deltochilini
- Genus: Anomiopus
- Species: A. virescens

Binomial name
- Anomiopus virescens ( Westwood, 1842)

Synonyms
- Onthocharis virescens Westwood, 1842

Species of beetle

Anomiopus virescens is a species of true dung beetle that can be found in Bolivia, Brazil and Paraguay. It can be found in the cerrado biome and surrounding areas, and is likely to be nocturnal and a myrmecophile.
