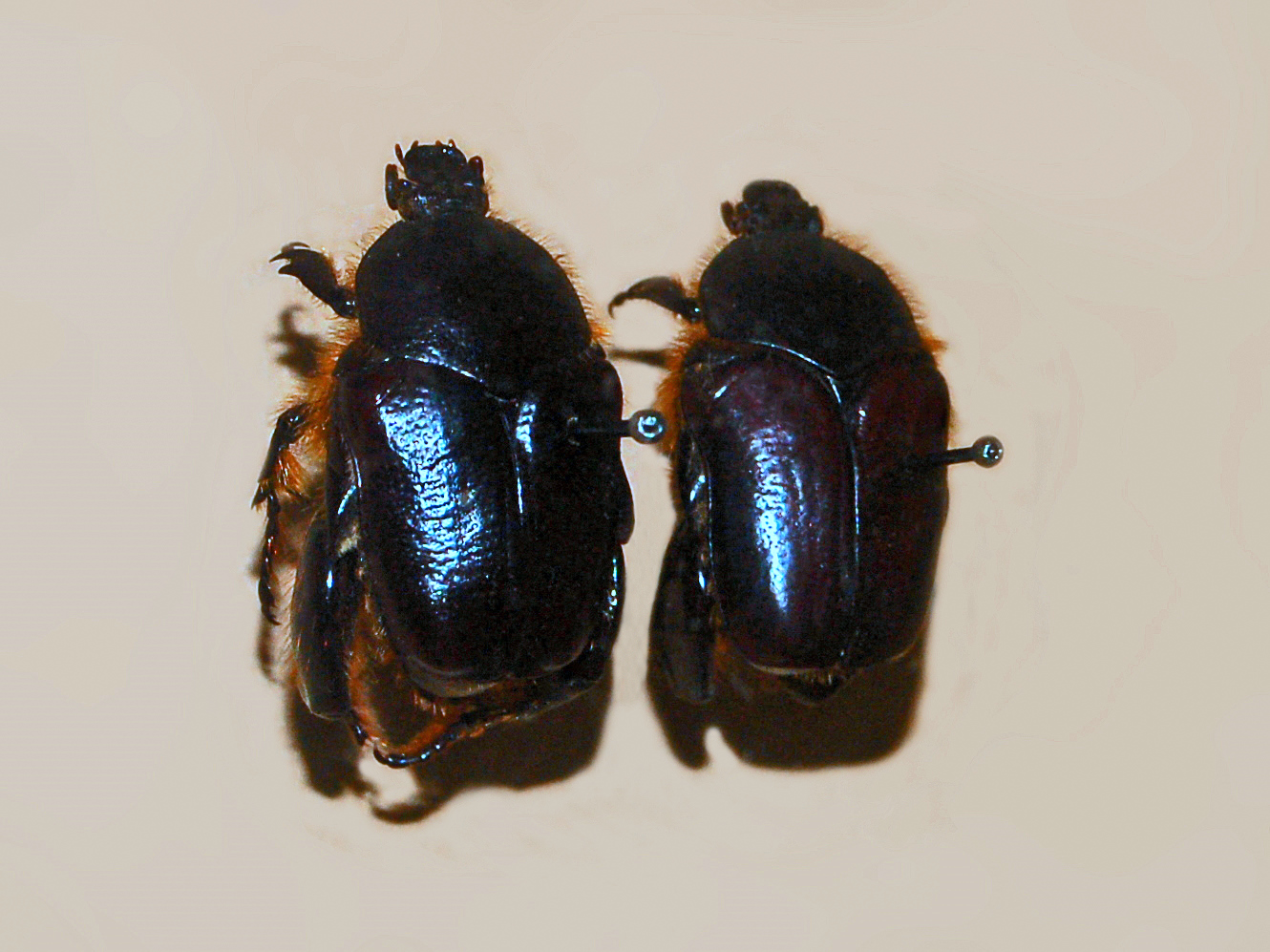
- Blaesia atra from Uruguay

Scientific classification
- Kingdom: Animalia
- Phylum: Arthropoda
- Clade: Pancrustacea
- Class: Insecta
- Order: Coleoptera
- Suborder: Polyphaga
- Infraorder: Scarabaeiformia
- Family: Scarabaeidae
- Genus: Blaesia
- Species: B. atra

Binomial name
- Blaesia atra Burmeister, 1842

= Blaesia atra =

Species of beetle

Blaesia atra is a beetle of the family Scarabaeidae and subfamily Cetoniinae.

== Description ==
Blaesia atra can reach about 14–20 millimetres (0.55–0.79 in) in length and about 8–12 millimetres (0.31–0.47 in) in width. The body is usually black, with dark brown reddish elytra. Antenna are black, with 10 segments. Pronotum and elytra are moderately punctate. Legs and venter have a dense fringe of rust colored setae. This species is associated with ants of Acromyrmex species (myrmecophily).

== Distribution ==
This species occurs in Paraguay, Uruguay, Argentina, Bolivia and southern Brazil.
