= Anomiopus smaragdinus =

Conservation status
- Least Concern (IUCN 3.1)

Scientific classification
- Kingdom: Animalia
- Phylum: Arthropoda
- Class: Insecta
- Order: Coleoptera
- Suborder: Polyphaga
- Infraorder: Scarabaeiformia
- Family: Scarabaeidae
- Subfamily: Scarabaeinae
- Tribe: Deltochilini
- Genus: Anomiopus
- Species: A. smaragdinus

Binomial name
- Anomiopus smaragdinus ( Westwood, 1842)

Synonyms
- Scatonomus smaragdina Westwood, 1842

Species of beetle

Anomiopus smaragdinus is a species of true dung beetle that can be found in Brazil, French Guiana, Venezuela and Bolivia. It may be a myrmecophile.
