= Anomiopus bonariensis =

Conservation status
- Least Concern (IUCN 3.1)

Scientific classification
- Kingdom: Animalia
- Phylum: Arthropoda
- Class: Insecta
- Order: Coleoptera
- Suborder: Polyphaga
- Infraorder: Scarabaeiformia
- Family: Scarabaeidae
- Subfamily: Scarabaeinae
- Tribe: Deltochilini
- Genus: Anomiopus
- Species: A. bonariensis

Binomial name
- Anomiopus bonariensis (Bruch, 1925)

Synonyms
- Dendropaemon bonariensis Bruch, 1925

Species of beetle

Anomiopus bonariensis is a species of true dung beetle that can be found in Argentina, Brazil (Minas Gerais) and Uruguay. It is a myrmecophile, and has been recorded living in nests of Acromyrmex lundii.
