= Anomiopus parallelus =

Conservation status
- Least Concern (IUCN 3.1)

Scientific classification
- Domain: Eukaryota
- Kingdom: Animalia
- Phylum: Arthropoda
- Class: Insecta
- Order: Coleoptera
- Suborder: Polyphaga
- Infraorder: Scarabaeiformia
- Family: Scarabaeidae
- Subfamily: Scarabaeinae
- Tribe: Deltochilini
- Genus: Anomiopus
- Species: A. parallelus

Binomial name
- Anomiopus parallelus (Harold, 1862)

Synonyms
- Onthocharis parallela Harold, 1862

Species of beetle

Anomiopus parallelus is a species of true dung beetle that can be found in northern Brazil and French Guiana, and can be found in the Amazon and Cerrado biomes. It may be a myrmecophile.
