= Neagolius =

- Neagolius heydeni

Scientific classification
- Kingdom: Animalia
- Phylum: Arthropoda
- Clade: Pancrustacea
- Class: Insecta
- Order: Coleoptera
- Suborder: Polyphaga
- Infraorder: Scarabaeiformia
- Family: Scarabaeidae
- Subfamily: Aphodiinae
- Tribe: Aphodiini
- Genus: Neagolius; Koshantschikov, 1912

Synonyms
- Aphodius (Neagolius) Koshantschikov, 1912

Genus of beetles

Neagolius is a genus of beetles of the family Scarabaeidae.

== Species ==
- Neagolius abchasicus (Reitter, 1892)
- Neagolius amblyodon (Daniel, 1900)
- Neagolius aragatsi Shokhin & Kalashian, 2015
- Neagolius bilimecki (Seidlitz, 1891)
- Neagolius dzhungaricus (Nikolajev & Frolov, 1997)
- Neagolius falcispinis (Koshantschikov, 1912)
- Neagolius haroldi (Koshantschikov, 1894)
- Neagolius hengduanensis (Král, 1997)
- Neagolius heydeni (Harold, 1871)
- Neagolius interstitialis (Koshantschikov, 1894)
- Neagolius liguricus (Daniel, 1902)
- Neagolius montanus (Erichson, 1848)
- Neagolius montisjuldi (Pittino, 1988)
- Neagolius montivagus (Erichson, 1848)
- Neagolius moronensis (Frolov, 2009)
- Neagolius orinus (Koshantschikov, 1912)
- Neagolius ovitensis (Pittino & Ballerio, 1994)
- Neagolius penninus (Daniel, 1902)
- Neagolius petri (Frolov, 2014)
- Neagolius pollicatus (Erichson, 1848)
- Neagolius praecox (Erichson, 1848)
- Neagolius savitskiyi (Gusakov, 2004)
- Neagolius schlumbergeri (Seidlitz, 1891)
- Neagolius suschkini (Koshantschikov, 1913)
- Neagolius takin (Král, 1995)
- Neagolius zangbo (Král, 1997)
