= Neagolius liguricus =

Scientific classification
- Kingdom: Animalia
- Phylum: Arthropoda
- Clade: Pancrustacea
- Class: Insecta
- Order: Coleoptera
- Suborder: Polyphaga
- Infraorder: Scarabaeiformia
- Family: Scarabaeidae
- Genus: Neagolius
- Species: N. liguricus

Binomial name
- Neagolius liguricus (Daniel, 1902)

Synonyms
- Aphodius (Agolius) praecox liguricus Daniel, 1902

Species of beetle

Neagolius liguricus is a species of beetle of the family Scarabaeidae. It is found in France.

== Description ==
Adults reach a length of about 3.5–5 mm (0.14–0.20 in). Males are black or blackish-brown, glossy, and glabrous, with the elytra brown, with the inner intervals and the apex sometimes somewhat lighter. Females are light reddish-yellow.
