= Neagolius schlumbergeri =

Scientific classification
- Kingdom: Animalia
- Phylum: Arthropoda
- Clade: Pancrustacea
- Class: Insecta
- Order: Coleoptera
- Suborder: Polyphaga
- Infraorder: Scarabaeiformia
- Family: Scarabaeidae
- Genus: Neagolius
- Species: N. schlumbergeri

Binomial name
- Neagolius schlumbergeri (Seidlitz, 1891)

Synonyms
- Aphodius (Nialus) schlumbergeri Seidlitz, 1891; Aphodius (Agolius) schlumbergeri samniticus Daniel, 1902; Aphodius consobrinus Daniel, 1900; Aphodius (Agolius) temperei Hoffmann, 1938

Species of beetle

Neagolius schlumbergeri is a species of beetle of the family Scarabaeidae. It is found in France, Andorra, Spain, Austria, Switzerland and Italy.

== Description ==
Adults reach a length of about 3.5–5 mm (0.14–0.20 in). They have a strongly convex, more or less shiny, black or brown body. The front of the clypeus, the sides of the pronotum, and sometimes a spot at the apex of the elytra are lighter. Females are yellowish-brown or light reddish-brown.

== Subspecies ==
- Neagolius schlumbergeri schlumbergeri (Seidlitz, 1891) (France: Pyrénées, Andorra, Spain: Pyrénées)
- Neagolius schlumbergeri consobrinus (Daniel, 1900) (Austria, Switzerland, Italy: Alps)
- Neagolius schlumbergeri samniticus (Daniel, 1902) (Italy: Apennine Mountains)
- Neagolius schlumbergeri temperei (Hoffmann, 1938) (France: Pyrénées, Massif Central, Spain: Cantabria)
