= Mecynodes kisilkumi =

Scientific classification
- Kingdom: Animalia
- Phylum: Arthropoda
- Clade: Pancrustacea
- Class: Insecta
- Order: Coleoptera
- Suborder: Polyphaga
- Infraorder: Scarabaeiformia
- Family: Scarabaeidae
- Genus: Mecynodes
- Species: M. kisilkumi

Binomial name
- Mecynodes kisilkumi (Solsky, 1876)

Synonyms
- Aphodius kisilkumi Solsky, 1876; Aphodius (Meraphodius) selenocarus Koshantschikov, 1894; Aphodius (Esimaphodius) mendidioides Reitter, 1892

Species of beetle

Mecynodes kisilkumi is a species of beetle of the family Scarabaeidae. It is found in Armenia, Azerbaijan, Iran, Iraq, Kazakhstan, Kyrgyzstan, Russia, Tajikistan, Turkey, Turkmenistan and Uzbekistan.

== Description ==
Adults reach a length of about 3.5–4 mm (0.14–0.16 in). They have a moderately to quite strongly shiny, glabrous body. The head and pronotum are dark chestnut-brown, with the front of the head and the sides of the pronotum yellowish. The scutellum is brown and the elytra are light to dark yellow-brown, with a darkened sutural margin. The legs are yellow-brown.
