= Anomiopus ataenioides =

Conservation status
- Data Deficient (IUCN 3.1)

Scientific classification
- Domain: Eukaryota
- Kingdom: Animalia
- Phylum: Arthropoda
- Class: Insecta
- Order: Coleoptera
- Suborder: Polyphaga
- Infraorder: Scarabaeiformia
- Family: Scarabaeidae
- Subfamily: Scarabaeinae
- Tribe: Deltochilini
- Genus: Anomiopus
- Species: A. ataenioides

Binomial name
- Anomiopus ataenioides (Martinez, 1952)

Synonyms
- Onthocharis ataenioides Martinez, 1952

Species of beetle

Anomiopus ataenioides is a species of true dung beetle that is endemic to northern Argentina, and is known from Salta, Jujuy, Tucumán and Corrientes provinces. It is believed to share ant colony nests (myrmecophile).
