= Grandinaphodius =

Scientific classification
- Kingdom: Animalia
- Phylum: Arthropoda
- Clade: Pancrustacea
- Class: Insecta
- Order: Coleoptera
- Suborder: Polyphaga
- Infraorder: Scarabaeiformia
- Family: Scarabaeidae
- Subfamily: Aphodiinae
- Tribe: Aphodiini
- Genus: Grandinaphodius; Ziani, 2002

Genus of beetles

Grandinaphodius is a genus of beetles of the family Scarabaeidae.

== Species ==
- Grandinaphodius inferorum Ziani, 2002
- Grandinaphodius smoliki (Käufel, 1914)
