= Nobiellus inclusus =

Scientific classification
- Kingdom: Animalia
- Phylum: Arthropoda
- Clade: Pancrustacea
- Class: Insecta
- Order: Coleoptera
- Suborder: Polyphaga
- Infraorder: Scarabaeiformia
- Family: Scarabaeidae
- Genus: Nobiellus
- Species: N. inclusus

Binomial name
- Nobiellus inclusus (Reitter, 1892)

Synonyms
- Aphodius (Melinopterus) inclusum Reitter, 1892; Aphodius (Mendidius) kulikulanus Balthasar, 1970; Aphodius (Agrilinus) glasunowi Koshantschikov, 1894

Species of beetle

Nobiellus inclusus is a species of beetle of the family Scarabaeidae. It is found in Armenia, Iran, Russia, Tajikistan, Turkmenistan and Uzbekistan.

== Description ==
Adults reach a length of about 3.5–4 mm (0.14–0.16 in). They have an elongate, strongly convex, shining, glabrous body. The head and pronotum are black, with the anterior angles and often also the lateral margins of the pronotum reddish-yellow. The scutellum is dark and the elytra are yellowish-brown, with a dark sutural interval and a dark to blackish-brown pattern. The legs are reddish-brown.
