= Neagolius montanus =

Scientific classification
- Kingdom: Animalia
- Phylum: Arthropoda
- Clade: Pancrustacea
- Class: Insecta
- Order: Coleoptera
- Suborder: Polyphaga
- Infraorder: Scarabaeiformia
- Family: Scarabaeidae
- Genus: Neagolius
- Species: N. montanus

Binomial name
- Neagolius montanus (Erichson, 1848)

Synonyms
- Aphodius montanus Erichson, 1848; Aphodius sterbai Rambousek, 1915; Aphodius deubeli Reitter, 1897

Species of beetle

Neagolius montanus is a species of beetle of the family Scarabaeidae. It is found in Albania, Austria, Bosnia Herzegovina, Bulgaria, Croatia, France, Germany, Italy, Macedonia, Poland, Romania, Russia, Slovakia, Slovenia, Spain and Switzerland.

== Description ==
Adults reach a length of about 4.5–6 mm (0.18–0.24 in). They have a strongly convex, glossy, glabrous, blackish-brown body, with chestnut-brown elytra. In males, the anterior margin of the head and the sides of the pronotum are lighter, while in females, the dorsal surface is light brown.
