= Mecynodes =

Scientific classification
- Kingdom: Animalia
- Phylum: Arthropoda
- Clade: Pancrustacea
- Class: Insecta
- Order: Coleoptera
- Suborder: Polyphaga
- Infraorder: Scarabaeiformia
- Family: Scarabaeidae
- Subfamily: Aphodiinae
- Tribe: Aphodiini
- Genus: Mecynodes; Mulsant & Rey, 1870

Synonyms
- Aphodius (Mecynodes) Mulsant & Rey, 1870; Aphodius (Meraphodius) Koshantschikov, 1894; Aphodius (Esimaphodius) Reitter, 1892

Genus of beetles

Mecynodes is a genus of beetles of the family Scarabaeidae.

== Species ==
- Mecynodes anemurensis (Petrovitz, 1968)
- Mecynodes angulosus (Harold, 1869)
- Mecynodes asmaricus (Balthasar, 1955)
- Mecynodes becvari (Červenka, 1995)
- Mecynodes demoflysi (Baraud, 1977)
- Mecynodes gilvipennis (Balthasar, 1946)
- Mecynodes kisilkumi (Solsky, 1876)
- Mecynodes leucopterus (Klug, 1830)
- Mecynodes stereotypus (Koshantschikov, 1894)
- Mecynodes striatulus (Waltl, 1835)
- Mecynodes trochilus (Reitter, 1892)
- Mecynodes zagrosensis Minkina, Miessen & Král, 2021
