= Anomiopus laetus =

Conservation status
- Data Deficient (IUCN 3.1)

Scientific classification
- Domain: Eukaryota
- Kingdom: Animalia
- Phylum: Arthropoda
- Class: Insecta
- Order: Coleoptera
- Suborder: Polyphaga
- Infraorder: Scarabaeiformia
- Family: Scarabaeidae
- Subfamily: Scarabaeinae
- Tribe: Deltochilini
- Genus: Anomiopus
- Species: A. laetus

Binomial name
- Anomiopus laetus (Waterhouse, 1891)

Synonyms
- Onthocharis laeta Waterhouse, 1891

Species of beetle

Anomiopus laetus is a species of true dung beetle that is endemic to Brazil, and is known from Amazonas, Pará and Acre states. It may be a myrmecophile.
