= Neagolius bilimecki =

Scientific classification
- Kingdom: Animalia
- Phylum: Arthropoda
- Clade: Pancrustacea
- Class: Insecta
- Order: Coleoptera
- Suborder: Polyphaga
- Infraorder: Scarabaeiformia
- Family: Scarabaeidae
- Genus: Neagolius
- Species: N. bilimecki

Binomial name
- Neagolius bilimecki (Seidlitz, 1891)

Synonyms
- Aphodius (Nialus) bilimecki Seidlitz, 1891; Neagolius bilimecki sulfureipennis Dellacasa & Dellacasa, 2005; Aphodius (Agolius) bilimecki picturatus Daniel, 1902; Aphodius danielorum Semenov, 1902; Aphodius (Agolius) bernhaueri Reitter, 1896; Aphodius (Agolius) limbolarius Reitter, 1892

Species of beetle

Neagolius bilimecki is a species of beetle of the family Scarabaeidae. It is found in Albania, Austria, Bosnia and Herzegovina, Croatia, Germany, Greece, Italy, Macedonia, Serbia, Slovakia and Switzerland.

== Description ==
Adults reach a length of about 4–5.5 mm (0.16–0.22 in). They have a moderately convex, shiny, glabrous, dark brown to blackish-brown body. The elytra are yellowish-brown with variable brown markings and a darkened apex. The legs are light to dark brown.
