= Neagolius montivagus =

Scientific classification
- Kingdom: Animalia
- Phylum: Arthropoda
- Clade: Pancrustacea
- Class: Insecta
- Order: Coleoptera
- Suborder: Polyphaga
- Infraorder: Scarabaeiformia
- Family: Scarabaeidae
- Genus: Neagolius
- Species: N. montivagus

Binomial name
- Neagolius montivagus (Erichson, 1848)

Synonyms
- Aphodius montivagus Erichson, 1848; Aphodius montivagus cingulatus Schmidt, 1917; Aphodius (Agolius) montivagus cenisius Daniel, 1902; Aphodius montivagus brunneus Schilsky, 1888

Species of beetle

Neagolius montivagus is a species of beetle of the family Scarabaeidae. It is found in Austria, Germany and Italy.

== Description ==
Adults reach a length of about 4.5–5.5 mm (0.18–0.22 in). They have a strongly convex, glabrous, shiny, black body, in males with the elytra lighter reddish-brown or sometimes only with lighter lateral margins. The sides of the pronotum are often reddish-brown. Females are yellowish-brown.
