= Neagolius praecox =

Scientific classification
- Kingdom: Animalia
- Phylum: Arthropoda
- Clade: Pancrustacea
- Class: Insecta
- Order: Coleoptera
- Suborder: Polyphaga
- Infraorder: Scarabaeiformia
- Family: Scarabaeidae
- Genus: Neagolius
- Species: N. praecox

Binomial name
- Neagolius praecox (Erichson, 1848)

Synonyms
- Aphodius praecox Erichson, 1848; Aphodius hibernus Gistel, 1857; Aphodius picimanus Erichson, 1848; Aphodius schmidtii Rosenhauer, 1847

Species of beetle

Neagolius praecox is a species of beetle of the family Scarabaeidae. It is found in the Austrian Alps and Pennine Alps.

== Description ==
Adults reach a length of about 3–4.5 mm (0.12–0.18 in). They have a strongly convex, glossy, glabrous body. Males are black, with the elytra yellow to reddish-brown, and with dark longitudinal spots. In females, the dorsal surface is light brown or reddish-yellow, sometimes with a dark spot behind the middle of the elytra.
