= Nobiellus =

Scientific classification
- Kingdom: Animalia
- Phylum: Arthropoda
- Clade: Pancrustacea
- Class: Insecta
- Order: Coleoptera
- Suborder: Polyphaga
- Infraorder: Scarabaeiformia
- Family: Scarabaeidae
- Subfamily: Aphodiinae
- Tribe: Aphodiini
- Genus: Nobiellus; Dellacasa & Dellacasa, 2005

Genus of beetles

Nobiellus is a genus of beetles of the family Scarabaeidae.

== Species ==
- Nobiellus bonnairei (Reitter, 1892)
- Nobiellus circumductus (Solsky, 1876)
- Nobiellus inclusus (Reitter, 1892)
- Nobiellus pustulifer (Reitter, 1892)
