= Anomiopus lacordairei =

Conservation status
- Data Deficient (IUCN 3.1)

Scientific classification
- Domain: Eukaryota
- Kingdom: Animalia
- Phylum: Arthropoda
- Class: Insecta
- Order: Coleoptera
- Suborder: Polyphaga
- Infraorder: Scarabaeiformia
- Family: Scarabaeidae
- Subfamily: Scarabaeinae
- Tribe: Deltochilini
- Genus: Anomiopus
- Species: A. lacordairei

Binomial name
- Anomiopus lacordairei (Waterhouse, 1891)

Synonyms
- Onthocharis lacordairei Waterhouse, 1891

Species of beetle

Anomiopus lacordairei is a species of true dung beetle that is endemic to French Guiana, and is only known from Cayenne. It has been recorded from lowland forests, and it may be a myrmecophile.
