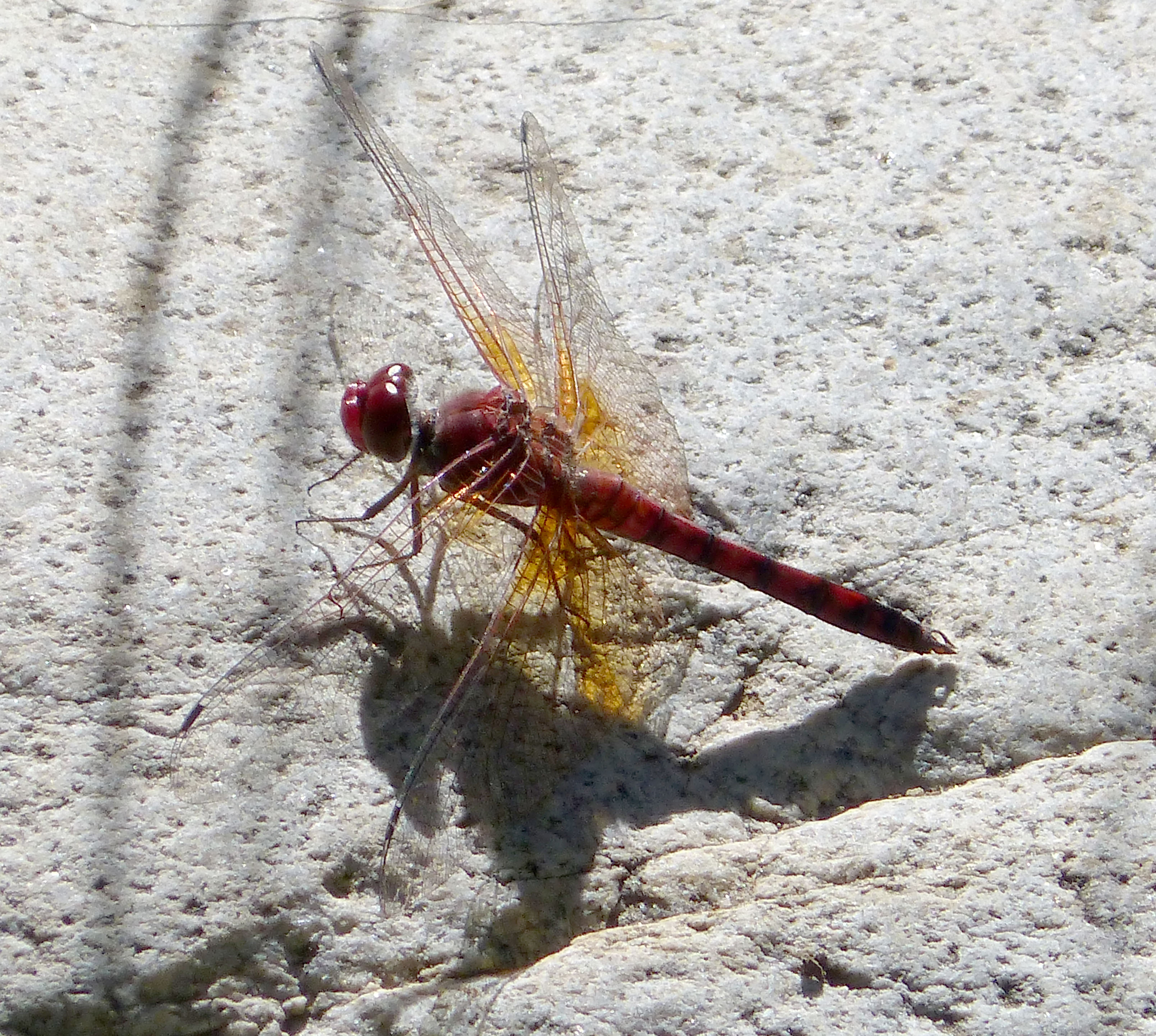
- Paltothemis lineatipes

Scientific classification
- Kingdom: Animalia
- Phylum: Arthropoda
- Class: Insecta
- Order: Odonata
- Infraorder: Anisoptera
- Family: Libellulidae
- Subfamily: Trithemistinae
- Genus: Paltothemis; Karsch, 1890

= Paltothemis =

Genus of dragonflies

Paltothemis is a genus of skimmers in the family Libellulidae.

== Species ==
There are at least three species recognised in the genus Paltothemis:

| Male | Female | Scientific name | Common name | Distribution |
|---|---|---|---|---|
| | | Paltothemis cyanosoma Garrison, 1982 | blue rock skimmer | Mexico, where it is found in Guerrero, Jalisco, and Michoacán |
| | | Paltothemis lineatipes Karsch, 1890 | red rock skimmer | southwestern United States, parts of Mexico and southward to Costa Rica |
| | | Paltothemis nicolae Hellebuyck, 2002 | | El Salvador |
