= Neagolius amblyodon =

Scientific classification
- Kingdom: Animalia
- Phylum: Arthropoda
- Clade: Pancrustacea
- Class: Insecta
- Order: Coleoptera
- Suborder: Polyphaga
- Infraorder: Scarabaeiformia
- Family: Scarabaeidae
- Genus: Neagolius
- Species: N. amblyodon

Binomial name
- Neagolius amblyodon (Daniel, 1900)

Synonyms
- Aphodius amblyodon Daniel, 1900

Species of beetle

Neagolius amblyodon is a species of beetle of the family Scarabaeidae. It is found in France.

== Description ==
Adults reach a length of about 3.5–5 mm (0.14–0.20 in). They have a quite strongly convex, shiny, glabrous body. In males, the dorsal surface is black or blackish-brown, with the elytra lighter brown. In females, the entire dorsal surface is light brown to reddish-brown.
