= Anomiopus soledari =

Conservation status
- Data Deficient (IUCN 3.1)

Scientific classification
- Domain: Eukaryota
- Kingdom: Animalia
- Phylum: Arthropoda
- Class: Insecta
- Order: Coleoptera
- Suborder: Polyphaga
- Infraorder: Scarabaeiformia
- Family: Scarabaeidae
- Subfamily: Scarabaeinae
- Tribe: Deltochilini
- Genus: Anomiopus
- Species: A. soledari

Binomial name
- Anomiopus soledari Canhedo, 2004

Species of beetle

Anomiopus soledari is a species of true dung beetle that is endemic to Brazil, and can be found in the Federal District and Goiás State. It can be found in the cerrado biome, and may be a myrmecophile.
