= Anomiopus birai =

Conservation status
- Data Deficient (IUCN 3.1)

Scientific classification
- Domain: Eukaryota
- Kingdom: Animalia
- Phylum: Arthropoda
- Class: Insecta
- Order: Coleoptera
- Suborder: Polyphaga
- Infraorder: Scarabaeiformia
- Family: Scarabaeidae
- Subfamily: Scarabaeinae
- Tribe: Deltochilini
- Genus: Anomiopus
- Species: A. birai

Binomial name
- Anomiopus birai Canhedo, 2006

Species of beetle

Anomiopus birai is a species of true dung beetle that is known from Caaguazú and Concepción departments of Paraguay, and Mato Grosso do Sul and Mato Grosso states of Brazil. It is found in cerrado savanna at low altitudes, and is a myrmecophile (cohabits with ant colonies).
