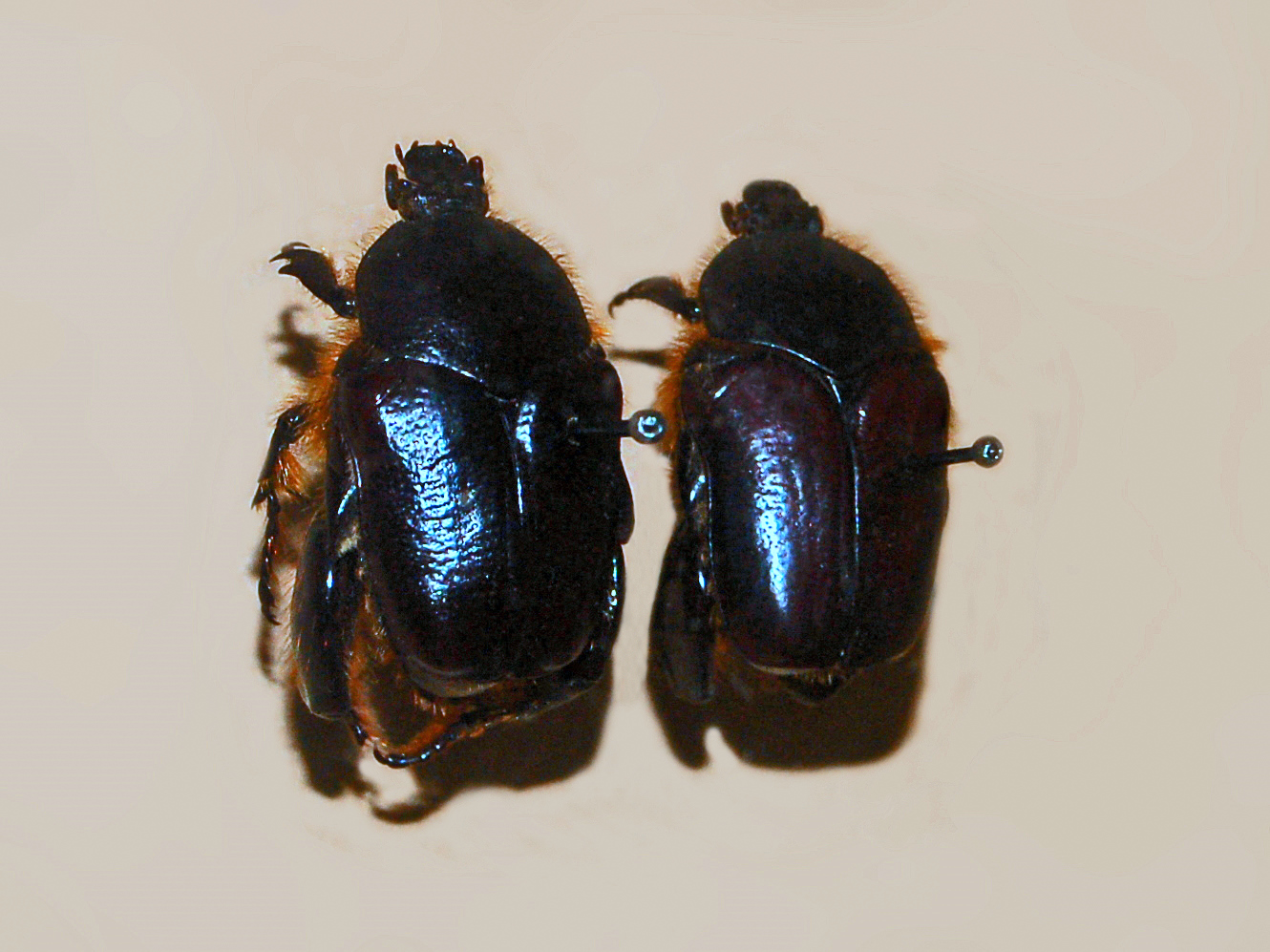
- Blaesia atra from Uruguay

Scientific classification
- Domain: Eukaryota
- Kingdom: Animalia
- Phylum: Arthropoda
- Class: Insecta
- Order: Coleoptera
- Suborder: Polyphaga
- Infraorder: Scarabaeiformia
- Family: Scarabaeidae
- Subfamily: Cetoniinae
- Tribe: Gymnetini
- Subtribe: Blaesiina
- Genus: Blaesia; Burmeister, 1842

Species
- Blaesia atra Burmeister, 1842; Blaesia subrugosa Moser, 1905

= Blaesia =

Genus of beetles

Blaesia is a genus of beetle of the subfamily Cetoniinae in the family Scarabaeidae. Its two species are found in southern South America. It is one of two genera in the subtribe Blaesiina.
