= Neagolius falcispinis =

Scientific classification
- Kingdom: Animalia
- Phylum: Arthropoda
- Clade: Pancrustacea
- Class: Insecta
- Order: Coleoptera
- Suborder: Polyphaga
- Infraorder: Scarabaeiformia
- Family: Scarabaeidae
- Genus: Neagolius
- Species: N. falcispinis

Binomial name
- Neagolius falcispinis (Koshantschikov, 1912)

Synonyms
- Aphodius (Neagolius) falcispinis Koshantschikov, 1912; Aphodius (Melinopterus) pallidicinctus Reitter, 1892

Species of beetle

Neagolius falcispinis is a species of beetle of the family Scarabaeidae. It is found in China (Gansu, Qinghai, Xinjiang), Kazakhstan, Mongolia, the Russian Far East and Siberia.

== Description ==
Adults reach a length of about 4–4.5 mm (0.16–0.18 in). They have an oblong, moderately convex, shiny, glabrous body. The males are brown-reddish, with the sides of the head and front angles of the pronotum reddish and the elytra usually with a discal dark brownish spot. Females are testaceous.
