= Mecynodes leucopterus =

Scientific classification
- Kingdom: Animalia
- Phylum: Arthropoda
- Clade: Pancrustacea
- Class: Insecta
- Order: Coleoptera
- Suborder: Polyphaga
- Infraorder: Scarabaeiformia
- Family: Scarabaeidae
- Genus: Mecynodes
- Species: M. leucopterus

Binomial name
- Mecynodes leucopterus (Klug, 1830)

Synonyms
- Aphodius leucopterus Klug, 1830; Aphodius forcipatus Harold, 1868; Aphodius luridipennis Mulsant, 1851

Species of beetle

Mecynodes leucopterus is a species of beetle of the family Scarabaeidae. It is found in Algeria, Cyprus, Egypt, Libya, Morocco, Palestine, Spain and Tunisia.

== Description ==
Adults reach a length of about 3.2–4 mm (0.13–0.16 in). They have an elongate-oval, moderately convex, glabrous, shining body. The head and pronotum are blackish-brown, with the anterior margin of the head and the lateral margins of the pronotum yellowish-red. The elytra are pale yellowish-brown, with a darkened sutural edge. The legs are light reddish-brown.
