= Neagolius abchasicus =

Scientific classification
- Kingdom: Animalia
- Phylum: Arthropoda
- Clade: Pancrustacea
- Class: Insecta
- Order: Coleoptera
- Suborder: Polyphaga
- Infraorder: Scarabaeiformia
- Family: Scarabaeidae
- Genus: Neagolius
- Species: N. abchasicus

Binomial name
- Neagolius abchasicus (Reitter, 1892)

Synonyms
- Aphodius (Agolius) abchasicus Reitter, 1892

Species of beetle

Neagolius abchasicus is a species of beetle of the family Scarabaeidae. It is found in Georgia and Russia.

== Description ==
Adults reach a length of about 4.5–5 mm (0.18–0.20 in). They have a strongly convex, glossy, glabrous body. The forebody is either dark brown with lighter brown elytra, or the entire dorsal surface is light brown, with the disc of the pronotum darker.
