= Mecynodes striatulus =

Scientific classification
- Kingdom: Animalia
- Phylum: Arthropoda
- Clade: Pancrustacea
- Class: Insecta
- Order: Coleoptera
- Suborder: Polyphaga
- Infraorder: Scarabaeiformia
- Family: Scarabaeidae
- Genus: Mecynodes
- Species: M. striatulus

Binomial name
- Mecynodes striatulus (Waltl, 1835)

Synonyms
- Aphodius striatulus Waltl, 1835; Aphodius (Esymus) parisii Schatzmayr, 1937; Aphodius (Orodalus) parallelus fenestratus Reitter, 1892; Aphodius tormes Graëlls, 1858; Aphodius parallelus Mulsant, 1843

Species of beetle

Mecynodes striatulus is a species of beetle of the family Scarabaeidae. It is found in Albania, Algeria, Bosnia and Herzegovina, Croatia, France, Greece, Italy, Libya, Morocco, Portugal, Slovenia, Spain, Syria, Tunisia and Turkey.

== Description ==
Adults reach a length of about 2.5–4 mm (0.098–0.157 in). They have a strongly elongate, cylindrical, sericeous, glabrous, blackish body. Sometimes, the elytra have a yellowish discal spot or are yellowish with blackish suture.
