= Anomiopus caputipilus =

Conservation status
- Data Deficient (IUCN 3.1)

Scientific classification
- Domain: Eukaryota
- Kingdom: Animalia
- Phylum: Arthropoda
- Class: Insecta
- Order: Coleoptera
- Suborder: Polyphaga
- Infraorder: Scarabaeiformia
- Family: Scarabaeidae
- Genus: Anomiopus
- Species: A. caputipilus

Binomial name
- Anomiopus caputipilus Canhedo, 2004

Species of beetle

Anomiopus caputipilus is a species of true dung beetle that is endemic to Goiás and Mato Grosso in Brazil. It occurs in cerrado above 700 m altitude. It may be a myrmecophile. It may be threatened by soy bean, cotton and sunflower plantations and cattle ranching.
