= Mecynodes gilvipennis =

Scientific classification
- Kingdom: Animalia
- Phylum: Arthropoda
- Clade: Pancrustacea
- Class: Insecta
- Order: Coleoptera
- Suborder: Polyphaga
- Infraorder: Scarabaeiformia
- Family: Scarabaeidae
- Genus: Mecynodes
- Species: M. gilvipennis

Binomial name
- Mecynodes gilvipennis (Balthasar, 1946)

Synonyms
- Aphodius (Esymaphodius) gilvipennis Balthasar, 1946

Species of beetle

Mecynodes gilvipennis is a species of beetle of the family Scarabaeidae. It is found in Afghanistan, Turkey and Uzbekistan.

== Description ==
Adults reach a length of about 3.5–4 mm (0.14–0.16 in). They have an elongate, nearly parallel-sided, glabrous, highly lustrous body. The head is reddish anteriorly and dark brown posteriorly and the pronotum is dark brown with yellowish-red lateral margins. The scutellum is lighter brown and the elytra are light yellowish-brown, with the sutural interval reddish-brown and the sutural edge darkened. The legs are yellowish-brown.
