= Neagolius haroldi =

Scientific classification
- Kingdom: Animalia
- Phylum: Arthropoda
- Clade: Pancrustacea
- Class: Insecta
- Order: Coleoptera
- Suborder: Polyphaga
- Infraorder: Scarabaeiformia
- Family: Scarabaeidae
- Genus: Neagolius
- Species: N. haroldi

Binomial name
- Neagolius haroldi (Koshantschikov, 1894)

Synonyms
- Aphodius (Agolius) haroldi Koshantschikov, 1894

Species of beetle

Neagolius haroldi is a species of beetle of the family Scarabaeidae. It is found in China (Xinjiang), Kazakhstan and Kyrgyzstan.

== Description ==
Adults reach a length of about 4.5–5.5 mm (0.18–0.22 in). They have a shiny, glabrous, black or blackish-brown body. The anterior angles of the pronotum are reddish and the elytra are sometimes brown and have tiny hairs at the apex.
