= Nobiellus pustulifer =

Scientific classification
- Kingdom: Animalia
- Phylum: Arthropoda
- Clade: Pancrustacea
- Class: Insecta
- Order: Coleoptera
- Suborder: Polyphaga
- Infraorder: Scarabaeiformia
- Family: Scarabaeidae
- Genus: Nobiellus
- Species: N. pustulifer

Binomial name
- Nobiellus pustulifer (Reitter, 1892)

Synonyms
- Aphodius (Volinus) pustulifer Reitter, 1892; Aphodius pustulifer malyi Obenberger, 1914

Species of beetle

Nobiellus pustulifer is a species of beetle of the family Scarabaeidae. It is found in Kazakhstan, Russia, Syria, Tajikistan, Turkmenistan and Uzbekistan.

== Description ==
Adults reach a length of about 3.5–4 mm (0.14–0.16 in). They have an oval-elongate, convex, shiny, almost glabrous body. The head and pronotum are dark brownish, the latter with the sides and anterior angles pale reddish. The elytra are yellowish with a brownish spot and a small, blackish preapical spot. The legs are reddish-brown and the antennal club is piceous.
