= Anomiopus =

Scientific classification
- Kingdom: Animalia
- Phylum: Arthropoda
- Class: Insecta
- Order: Coleoptera
- Suborder: Polyphaga
- Infraorder: Scarabaeiformia
- Family: Scarabaeidae
- Subfamily: Scarabaeinae
- Tribe: Deltochilini
- Genus: Anomiopus; Westwood, 1842

Synonyms
- Anomipus Chamorro, Marin-Armijos, Asenjo & Vaz-De-Mello, 2019; Anomoeopus Agassiz, 1846; Onthocharis Dejean, 1833

Genus of beetles

Anomiopus is a genus of scarab beetles in the family Scarabaeidae. There are more than 60 described species in Anomiopus, found in Central and South America.

== Species ==
These 65 species belong to the genus Anomiopus:

- Anomiopus aequalis (Waterhouse, 1891)
- Anomiopus alexandrei Canhedo, 2006
- Anomiopus andrei Canhedo, 2006
- Anomiopus apuskispay Figueroa & Edmonds, 2015
- Anomiopus ataenioides (Martinez, 1952)
- Anomiopus batesi (Waterhouse, 1891)
- Anomiopus batesii (Waterhouse, 1891)
- Anomiopus bellus Waterhouse, 1891
- Anomiopus birai Canhedo, 2006
- Anomiopus bonariensis (Bruch, 1925)
- Anomiopus brevipes (Waterhouse, 1891)
- Anomiopus cambeforti Canhedo, 2006
- Anomiopus caputipilus Canhedo, 2004
- Anomiopus chalceus (Harold, 1867)
- Anomiopus cirulito Cano, 2018
- Anomiopus constrictus Waterhouse, 1892
- Anomiopus cuprarius (Harold, 1880)
- Anomiopus edmondsi Canhedo, 2006
- Anomiopus foveicollis Canhedo, 2006
- Anomiopus galileoae Canhedo, 2006
- Anomiopus genieri Canhedo, 2006
- Anomiopus germari (Harold, 1867)
- Anomiopus gilli Canhedo, 2006
- Anomiopus globosus Canhedo, 2006
- Anomiopus gracilis Canhedo, 2006
- Anomiopus hirsutus Canhedo, 2006
- Anomiopus howdeni Canhedo, 2006
- Anomiopus idei Canhedo, 2006
- Anomiopus impartectus Canhedo, 2004
- Anomiopus intermedius (Waterhouse, 1891)
- Anomiopus lacordairei (Waterhouse, 1891)
- Anomiopus laetus (Waterhouse, 1891)
- Anomiopus latistriatus Canhedo, 2006
- Anomiopus lauropalui (Vulcano & Pereira, 1973)
- Anomiopus lunatipes Canhedo, 2004
- Anomiopus mourai Canhedo, 2006
- Anomiopus myrmidon (Westwood, 1842)
- Anomiopus nigricans Westwood, 1842
- Anomiopus nigrocoeruleus (Martinez, 1955)
- Anomiopus octodentatus Canhedo, 2006
- Anomiopus palmispinus Canhedo, 2006
- Anomiopus panamensis (Paulian, 1939)
- Anomiopus paraensis Canhedo, 2004
- Anomiopus paraguaiensis Canhedo, 2004
- Anomiopus parallelus (Harold, 1862)
- Anomiopus pereirai (Martinez, 1955)
- Anomiopus pictus (Harold, 1862)
- Anomiopus pishtaco Edmonds & Figueroa, 2013
- Anomiopus preissae Canhedo, 2004
- Anomiopus pumilius Canhedo, 2006
- Anomiopus puncticollis (Harold, 1862)
- Anomiopus quadridentatus Canhedo, 2004
- Anomiopus serranus Canhedo, 2006
- Anomiopus similis Canhedo, 2004
- Anomiopus simplex (Waterhouse, 1891)
- Anomiopus smaragdinus (Westwood, 1842)
- Anomiopus soledari Canhedo, 2004
- Anomiopus sulcaticollis Canhedo, 2006
- Anomiopus sulcatus Canhedo, 2006
- Anomiopus tuberculicollis Canhedo, 2006
- Anomiopus tuberifrons Canhedo, 2004
- Anomiopus validus Canhedo, 2006
- Anomiopus virescens Westwood, 1842
- Anomiopus zaguryi Canhedo, 2006
- † Anomiopus juanae (Martinez, 1952)
