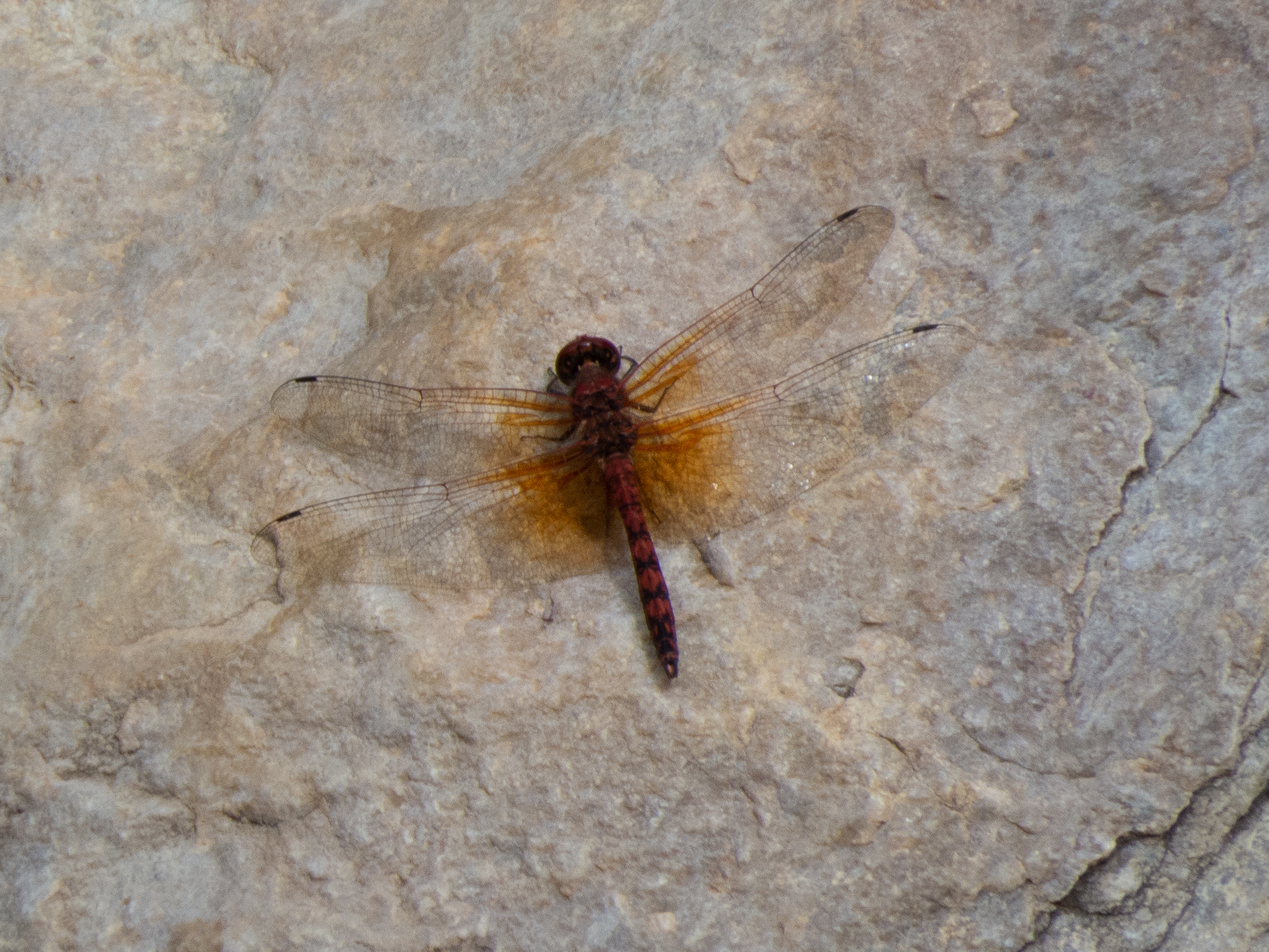

Conservation status
- Least Concern (IUCN 3.1)

Scientific classification
- Domain: Eukaryota
- Kingdom: Animalia
- Phylum: Arthropoda
- Class: Insecta
- Order: Odonata
- Infraorder: Anisoptera
- Family: Libellulidae
- Genus: Paltothemis
- Species: P. lineatipes

Binomial name
- Paltothemis lineatipes Karsch, 1890

Synonyms
- Paltothemis russata (Calvert, 1895)

= Paltothemis lineatipes =

Species of dragonfly

Paltothemis lineatipes, commonly known as the red rock skimmer, is a species of skimmer in the family Libellulidae. It is found in the Americas.

Paltothemis lineatipes is considered to be least concern by the International Union for Conservation of Nature. The population is stable.
