= Mecynodes asmaricus =

Scientific classification
- Kingdom: Animalia
- Phylum: Arthropoda
- Clade: Pancrustacea
- Class: Insecta
- Order: Coleoptera
- Suborder: Polyphaga
- Infraorder: Scarabaeiformia
- Family: Scarabaeidae
- Genus: Mecynodes
- Species: M. asmaricus

Binomial name
- Mecynodes asmaricus (Balthasar, 1955)

Synonyms
- Aphodius (Mecynodes) asmaricus Balthasar, 1955

Species of beetle

Mecynodes asmaricus is a species of beetle of the family Scarabaeidae. It is found in Afghanistan.

== Description ==
Adults reach a length of about 3.5 mm (0.14 in). They have an elongate, nearly parallel-sided, slightly convex, glabrous, black body, with most of the elytra darker brown. The forebody is shiny, while the elytra are rather dull. The legs are light reddish-brown.
