= Neagolius pollicatus =

Scientific classification
- Kingdom: Animalia
- Phylum: Arthropoda
- Clade: Pancrustacea
- Class: Insecta
- Order: Coleoptera
- Suborder: Polyphaga
- Infraorder: Scarabaeiformia
- Family: Scarabaeidae
- Genus: Neagolius
- Species: N. pollicatus

Binomial name
- Neagolius pollicatus (Erichson, 1848)

Synonyms
- Aphodius pollicatus Erichson, 1848

Species of beetle

Neagolius pollicatus is a species of beetle of the family Scarabaeidae. It is found in Austria and Italy.

== Description ==
Adults reach a length of about 4.5–5.5 mm (0.18–0.22 in). They have a strongly convex, shiny, glabrous, blackish-brown or dark brown body, with the elytra sometimes finely shagreened. The anterior margin of the head is reddish-brown.
