= Nobiellus circumductus =

Scientific classification
- Kingdom: Animalia
- Phylum: Arthropoda
- Clade: Pancrustacea
- Class: Insecta
- Order: Coleoptera
- Suborder: Polyphaga
- Infraorder: Scarabaeiformia
- Family: Scarabaeidae
- Genus: Nobiellus
- Species: N. circumductus

Binomial name
- Nobiellus circumductus (Solsky, 1876)

Synonyms
- Aphodius circumductus Solsky, 1876; Aphodius (Melinopterus) bachofeni Reitter, 1906

Species of beetle

Nobiellus circumductus is a species of beetle of the family Scarabaeidae. It is found in Azerbaijan, Kazakhstan, Russia, Turkmenistan and Uzbekistan.

== Description ==
Adults reach a length of about 3.4–3.8 mm (0.13–0.15 in). They have an elongate-oval, relatively parallel-sided, shiny, glabrous body. The head and pronotum are black, while the sides of the latter are sometimes somewhat lighter. The scutellum is dark and the elytra are light yellowish-brown, with a dark sutural interval and a dark spot. The legs are brown.
