= Neagolius interstitialis =

Scientific classification
- Kingdom: Animalia
- Phylum: Arthropoda
- Clade: Pancrustacea
- Class: Insecta
- Order: Coleoptera
- Suborder: Polyphaga
- Infraorder: Scarabaeiformia
- Family: Scarabaeidae
- Genus: Neagolius
- Species: N. interstitialis

Binomial name
- Neagolius interstitialis (Koshantschikov, 1894)

Synonyms
- Aphodius (Volinus) interstitialis Koshantschikov, 1894; Aphodius (Agolius) roniticus Stebnicka, 1975

Species of beetle

Neagolius interstitialis is a species of beetle of the family Scarabaeidae. It is found in Tajikistan.

== Description ==
Adults reach a length of about 4 mm (0.16 in). They have a rather short, convex, glossy, black body, with the anterior angles of the pronotum reddish and the elytra light yellowish-brown with a darkened suture and dark spots.
