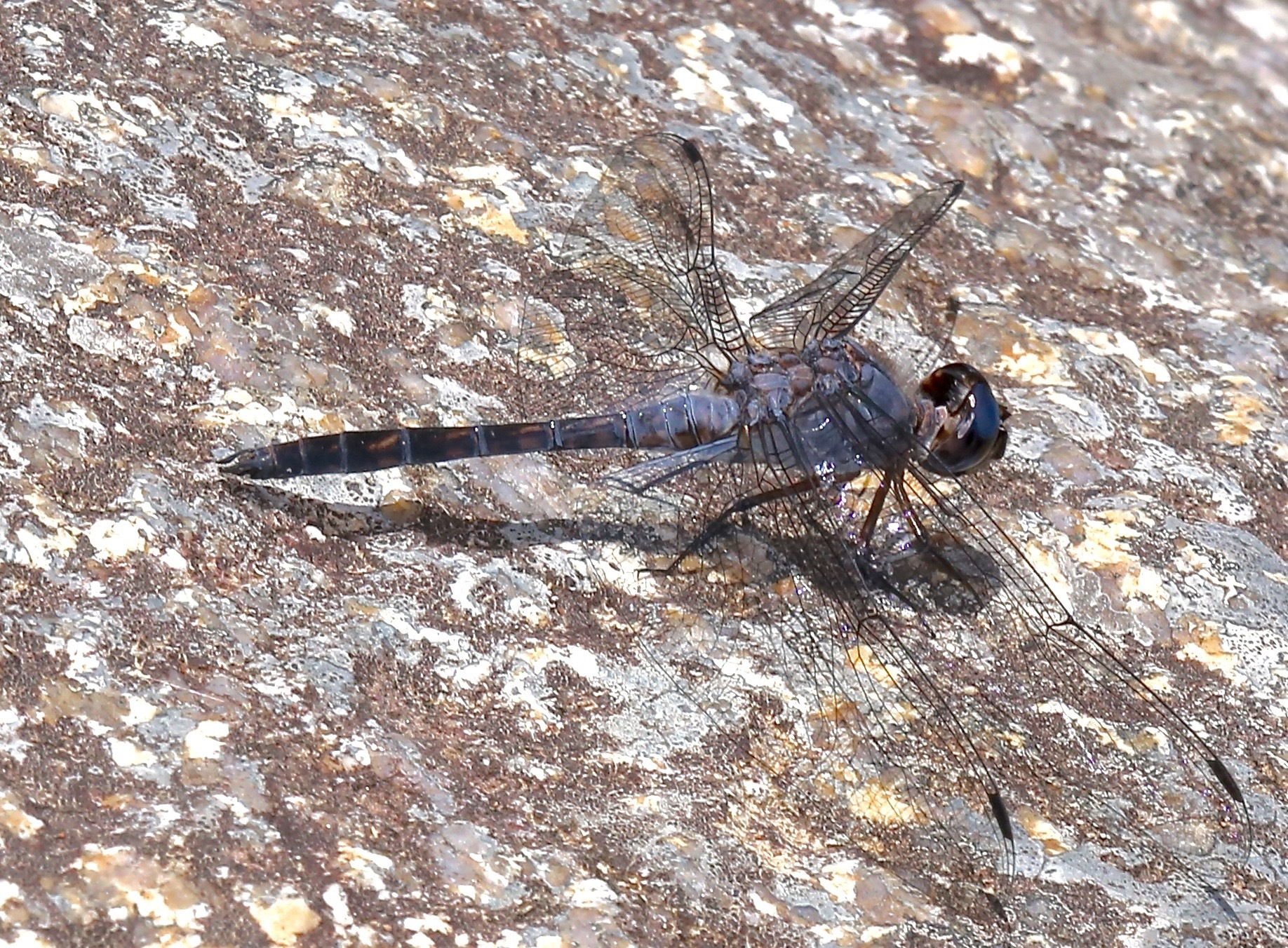

Conservation status
- Data Deficient (IUCN 3.1)

Scientific classification
- Kingdom: Animalia
- Phylum: Arthropoda
- Class: Insecta
- Order: Odonata
- Infraorder: Anisoptera
- Family: Libellulidae
- Genus: Paltothemis
- Species: P. cyanosoma

Binomial name
- Paltothemis cyanosoma Garrison, 1982

= Paltothemis cyanosoma =

Species of dragonfly

Paltothemis cyanosoma, also known as the blue rock skimmer, is a species of skimmer in the family Libellulidae. It is endemic to Mexico, where it is found in Guerrero, Jalisco, and Michoacán.
