= Anomiopus idei =

Conservation status
- Data Deficient (IUCN 3.1)

Scientific classification
- Kingdom: Animalia
- Phylum: Arthropoda
- Class: Insecta
- Order: Coleoptera
- Suborder: Polyphaga
- Infraorder: Scarabaeiformia
- Family: Scarabaeidae
- Subfamily: Scarabaeinae
- Tribe: Deltochilini
- Genus: Anomiopus
- Species: A. idei

Binomial name
- Anomiopus idei Canhedo, 2006

Species of beetle

Anomiopus idei is a species of true dung beetle that is endemic to Perú, and is only known from its type locality in Loreto Region.
