= Mecynodes angulosus =

Scientific classification
- Kingdom: Animalia
- Phylum: Arthropoda
- Clade: Pancrustacea
- Class: Insecta
- Order: Coleoptera
- Suborder: Polyphaga
- Infraorder: Scarabaeiformia
- Family: Scarabaeidae
- Genus: Mecynodes
- Species: M. angulosus

Binomial name
- Mecynodes angulosus (Harold, 1869)

Synonyms
- Aphodius angulosus Harold, 1869

Species of beetle

Mecynodes angulosus is a species of beetle of the family Scarabaeidae. It is found in Egypt, Palestine, Syria and Tunisia.

== Description ==
Adults reach a length of about 2–3 mm (0.079–0.118 in). They have a nearly parallel-sided, slightly convex, glabrous body. The head and pronotum are black, the latter with a faint iridescence. The elytra are pale yellow with a brown sutural interval and the legs are dark brown.
