= Neagolius heydeni =

Scientific classification
- Kingdom: Animalia
- Phylum: Arthropoda
- Clade: Pancrustacea
- Class: Insecta
- Order: Coleoptera
- Suborder: Polyphaga
- Infraorder: Scarabaeiformia
- Family: Scarabaeidae
- Genus: Neagolius
- Species: N. heydeni

Binomial name
- Neagolius heydeni (Harold, 1871)

Synonyms
- Aphodius heydeni Harold, 1871

Species of beetle

Neagolius heydeni is a species of beetle of the family Scarabaeidae. It is found in Spain.

== Description ==
Adults reach a length of about 5–5.5 mm (0.20–0.22 in). They have a quite strongly convex, shiny, glabrous, black or blackish-brown body, with the anterior angles of the pronotum lighter.
