= Mecynodes trochilus =

Scientific classification
- Kingdom: Animalia
- Phylum: Arthropoda
- Clade: Pancrustacea
- Class: Insecta
- Order: Coleoptera
- Suborder: Polyphaga
- Infraorder: Scarabaeiformia
- Family: Scarabaeidae
- Genus: Mecynodes
- Species: M. trochilus

Binomial name
- Mecynodes trochilus (Reitter, 1892)

Synonyms
- Aphodius (Esimus) trochilus Reitter, 1892

Species of beetle

Mecynodes trochilus is a species of beetle of the family Scarabaeidae. It is found in Palestine and Syria.

== Description ==
Adults reach a length of about 2.5–3.2 mm (0.098–0.126 in). They have a moderately shiny, glabrous body. The head and pronotum are blackish-brown, with the anterior angles of the latter yellowish-brown. The elytra are pale yellow, with the sutural margin brown, sometimes slightly iridescent, and often darkened at the tips. The legs are light rust-red.
