= Nobiellus bonnairei =

Scientific classification
- Kingdom: Animalia
- Phylum: Arthropoda
- Clade: Pancrustacea
- Class: Insecta
- Order: Coleoptera
- Suborder: Polyphaga
- Infraorder: Scarabaeiformia
- Family: Scarabaeidae
- Genus: Nobiellus
- Species: N. bonnairei

Binomial name
- Nobiellus bonnairei (Reitter, 1892)

Synonyms
- Aphodius (Melinopterus) bonnairei Reitter, 1892; Nobiellus bonnairei asfaricus Dellacasa & Dellacasa, 2005; Aphodius (Esymus) cuniculorum Mayet, 1904

Species of beetle

Nobiellus bonnairei is a species of beetle of the family Scarabaeidae. It is found in Algeria, France, Morocco and Spain.

== Description ==
Adults reach a length of about 3.5–4.5 mm (0.14–0.18 in). They have an elongate, convex, shiny, almost glabrous body. The head and pronotum are blackish, the latter with the anterior angles and the sides yellowish. The elytra are yellowish-brown, the legs brownish and the antennal club piceous.
