= Grandinaphodius smoliki =

Scientific classification
- Kingdom: Animalia
- Phylum: Arthropoda
- Clade: Pancrustacea
- Class: Insecta
- Order: Coleoptera
- Suborder: Polyphaga
- Infraorder: Scarabaeiformia
- Family: Scarabaeidae
- Genus: Grandinaphodius
- Species: G. smoliki

Binomial name
- Grandinaphodius smoliki (Käufel, 1914)

Synonyms
- Aphodius (Chilothorax) smoliki Käufel, 1914

Species of beetle

Grandinaphodius smoliki is a species of beetle of the family Scarabaeidae. It is found in Syria.

== Description ==
Adults reach a length of about 3.5 mm (0.14 in). They have an elongate, moderately convex, lustrous, almost glabrous body. The head and pronotum are piceous, the latter with the anterior angles reddish. The elytra are brownish, but yellowish on the disc. The legs are reddish-brown and the antennal club is dirty yellowish.
