= Grandinaphodius inferorum =

Scientific classification
- Kingdom: Animalia
- Phylum: Arthropoda
- Clade: Pancrustacea
- Class: Insecta
- Order: Coleoptera
- Suborder: Polyphaga
- Infraorder: Scarabaeiformia
- Family: Scarabaeidae
- Genus: Grandinaphodius
- Species: G. inferorum

Binomial name
- Grandinaphodius inferorum Ziani, 2002

Synonyms
- Aphodius (Chilothorax) smoliki Käufel, 1914

Species of beetle

Grandinaphodius inferorum is a species of beetle of the family Scarabaeidae. It is found in Lebanon.

== Description ==
Adults reach a length of about 3.9–4 mm (0.15–0.16 in). They have an brownish, moderately shiny, nearly glabrous body, with the legs, antennae and maxillary palpi reddish.

== Life history ==
Specimens have been collected at the entrances to the burrows of an unidentified small mammal in a mountainous area of Lebanon (near Faraya and El Aaqoura).

== Etymology ==
The species name is derived from the Latin inferi(infernal subterranean gods in Graeco-Roman mythology) and refers to the holes burrowed by small mammals at the entrance to which all the specimens were collected.
