= Anomiopus gracilis =

Conservation status
- Data Deficient (IUCN 3.1)

Scientific classification
- Domain: Eukaryota
- Kingdom: Animalia
- Phylum: Arthropoda
- Class: Insecta
- Order: Coleoptera
- Suborder: Polyphaga
- Infraorder: Scarabaeiformia
- Family: Scarabaeidae
- Subfamily: Scarabaeinae
- Tribe: Deltochilini
- Genus: Anomiopus
- Species: A. gracilis

Binomial name
- Anomiopus gracilis (Canhedo, 2006)

Species of beetle

Anomiopus gracilis is a species of true dung beetle that can be found in Brazil and Venezuela.
