= Myrmecophily =

Positive interspecies associations between ants and other organisms

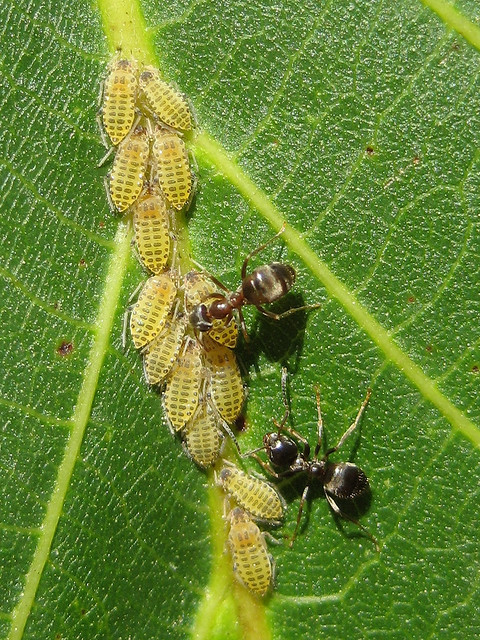
Myrmecophilous aphids being tended by ants

Myrmecophily (/mɜːrməˈkɒfəli/ mur-mə-KOF-ə-lee, lit. 'love of ants') consists of positive, mutualistic, interspecies associations between ants and a variety of other organisms, such as plants, other arthropods, and fungi. It may also include commensal or even parasitic interactions.

A "myrmecophile" is an organism that associates with ants. An estimated 10,000 species of ants (Formicidae) are known, with a higher diversity in the tropics. In most terrestrial ecosystems, ants are ecologically and numerically dominant, being the main invertebrate predators. As a result, ants play a key role in controlling arthropod richness, abundance, and community structure. The evolution of myrmecophilous interactions has contributed to the abundance and ecological success of ants, by ensuring a dependable and energy-rich food supply, thus providing a competitive advantage for ants over other invertebrate predators. Most such associations are opportunistic, unspecialized, and facultative, though obligate mutualisms are common.

As ant nests grow and become more specialized, they are more likely to house larger numbers and a greater diversity of myrmecophiles.

== Myrmecophile ==
A "myrmecophile" is an organism that lives in association with ants. Myrmecophiles have various roles in their host ant colony. Many consume waste materials in the nests, such as dead ants, dead larvae, or fungi growing in the nest. Some feed on the stored food supplies of ants, and a few are predatory on ant eggs, larvae, or pupae. Others benefit the ants by providing a food source for them. Most associations are facultative, benefiting one or both participants, but not being necessary to their survival, although many myrmecophilous relationships are obligate, meaning one or the other participant requires the relationship for survival. Many lycaenid caterpillars produce nectar in specialized organs, and communicate with ants through sound and vibrations. The association with ants reduces parasitism of the caterpillars. Myrmecophilous beetles occur in the families Coccinellidae (e.g. the ladybird Thalassa saginata), Aphodiidae, Scarabaeidae, Lucanidae, Cholevidae, Pselaphidae, Staphylinidae, Histeridae, and Ptiliidae. The myrmecophilous staphylinids are especially diverse. Myrmecophilous associations are also seen in aphids and treehoppers, in the hoverfly genus Microdon, and several other groups of flies. The mollusc Allopeas myrmekophilos is another non-insect myrmecophile.

Ant nests provide environmentally stable environments that are well organized and protected by the host colony. The ant guests can have a positive, neutral, or negative effect on the colony. If the infiltrating species' impact is too negative, they risk discovery; this usually forces myrmecophile populations to be small. Some spiders use Ant mimicry and chemical mimicry to infiltrate ant nests, usually to prey on food supplies or on the ants themselves. Aribates javensis, a species of oribatid mite, is an obligate myrmecophile that lives in ant nests. These mites are cared for by their ant hosts in exchange for eating litter and bacteria in the nest.

== Ant-plant interactions ==
Ant-plant interactions are geographically widespread, with hundreds of species of myrmecophytic plants in several families, including the Leguminosae, Euphorbiaceae, and Orchidaceae. In general, myrmecophytes (or ant plants) usually provide some form of shelter and food in exchange for ant "tending", which may include protection, seed dispersal (see myrmecochory), reduced competition from other plants, hygienic services, and/or nutrient supplementation.

Three structural adaptations of ant plants are extrafloral nectaries, domatia, and (least commonly) Beltian bodies. Domatia are nesting sites provided by the plant in the form of hollow stems, petioles, thorns, or curled leaves. Ant-specialized domatia exist in over 100 genera of tropical plants. Beltian bodies provide a high-energy food source to ants in the form of nutritive corpuscles produced on leaflet tips, and they have been described in at least 20 plant families. Extrafloral nectaries (EFNs) occur in at least 66 families of angiosperms, mainly in the tropics, with some in temperate species. They occur in some ferns, but are absent in gymnosperms. They are not used in pollination; their primary purpose is to attract and sustain tending ants. Many plants can control the flow of nectar from EFNs so that the availability of nectar varies according to daily and seasonal cycles. Because ants can respond quickly to changes in flow rate from EFNs, this may allow plants to induce greater ant activity during times of peak herbivory, and minimize overall costs of nectar production.

In exchange for nesting sites and food resources, ants protect plants from herbivores. For example, bullhorn acacias (Acacia cornigera) support and are protected by Pseudomyrmex ants in Central America. This system was studied by Daniel Janzen in the late 1960s. Since then many similar systems have been documented. In the bullhorn acacia system, in exchange for protection, the acacias provide domatia, Beltian bodies, and EFNs; the Pseudomyrmex ants can survive exclusively on these food resources. For many plants, ants significantly reduce herbivory from both phytophagous insects and organisms as large as grazing mammals. Obligately associated ant species are some of most aggressive ants in the world. They can defend a plant against herbivory by large mammals by repeatedly biting their attacker and spraying formic acid into the wounds.

Myrmecophily is an indirect form of plant defense against herbivory, though ants often provide other services as well. Some ants keep leaf surfaces clean, helping to deter disease, while others defend against fungal pathogens. Ants commonly prune epiphytes, vines, and parasitic plants from their host plant, and they sometimes thin the shoots of neighboring plants. This reduces plant-plant competition for space, light, nutrients, and water. In many ant-plant relationships, nutrient flow is bidirectional. While 80% of the carbon in the bodies of Azteca spp. workers is supplied by the host tree (Cecropia spp.), 90% of the Cecropia tree's nitrogen is supplied by ant debris carried to the tree as a result of external foraging. In light of these services, myrmecophily assists a plant's survival and ecological success, sometimes at a high cost to the plant in providing for the ants.

== Ant-arthropod interactions ==
Many species of arthropods are dependent on ant species and live amongst them in their nests. Mites are particularly adept at being myrmecophiles, being that they are small enough to enter nests easily and not to be evicted. Mites exhibit extreme myrmecophily in numbers far above other myrmecophiles.

== Ant-insect interactions ==
Ants tend a wide variety of insect species, most notably lycaenid butterfly caterpillars and hemipterans. About 41% of all ant genera include species that associate with insects. These types of ant-insect interactions involve the ant's providing some service in exchange for nutrients in the form of honeydew, a sugary fluid secreted by many phytophagous insects.

Some insects are adapted to contend with ant aggression, resulting in either mutualistic or parasitic bonds with ant colonies. Some coccinellid beetles have behaviors, body shapes, and chemical mimicry that enable them to prey on ant-tended aphids.

=== Hemiptera ===
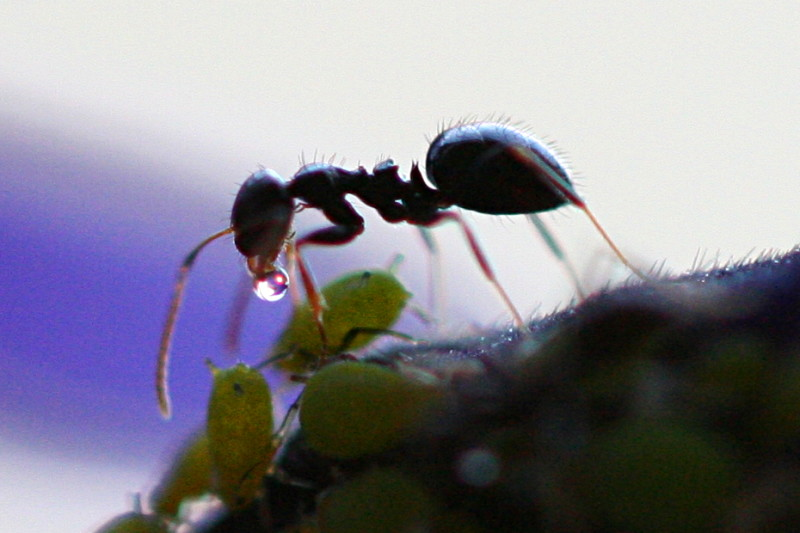
Ant obtaining honeydew from an aphid

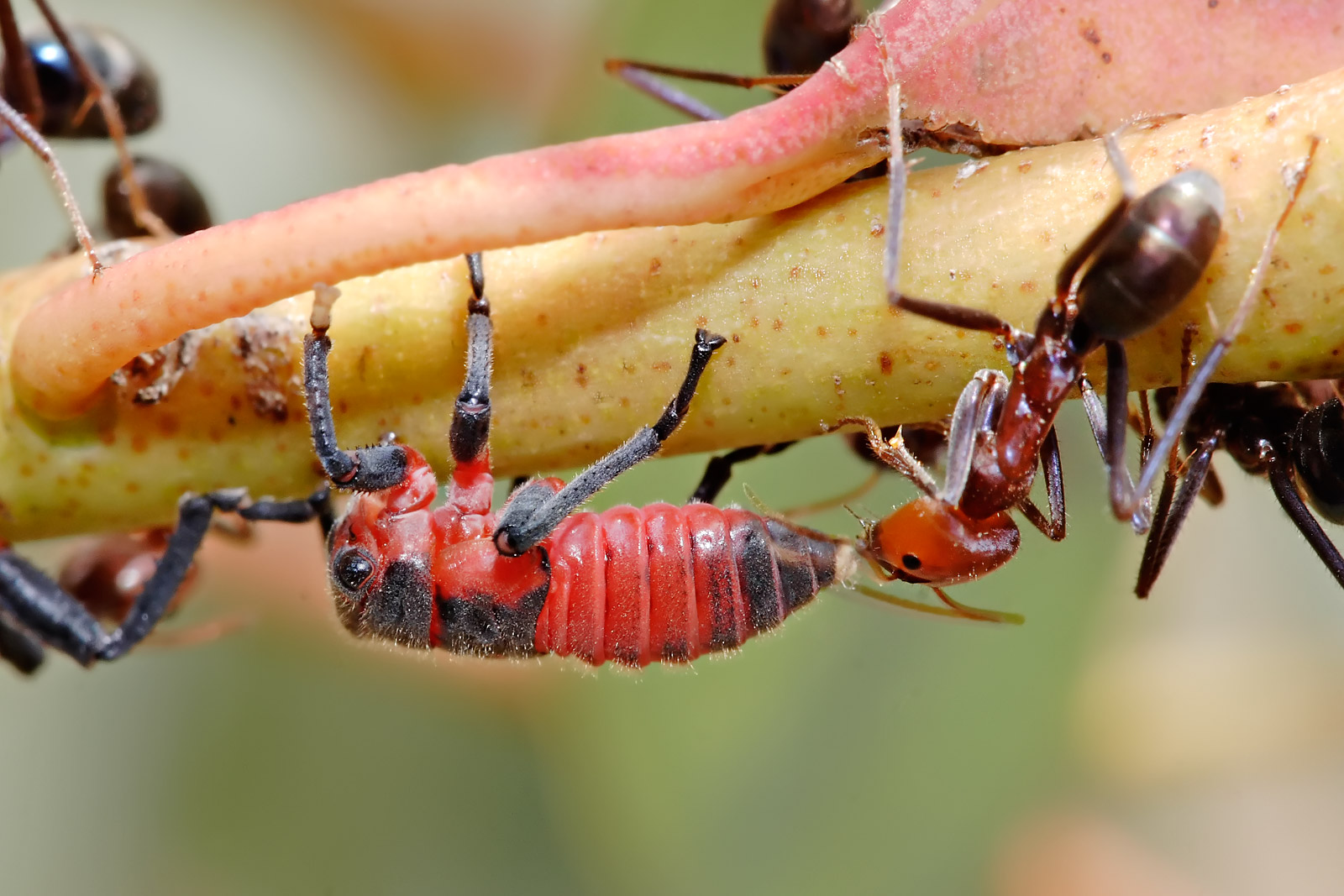
A leaf-hopper nymph tended by an ant

Aphids are the most abundant myrmecophiles in northern temperate zones. Aphids feed on the phloem sap of plants, and as they feed, they excrete honeydew droplets. The tending ants ingest these honeydew droplets, then return to their nest to regurgitate the fluid for their nestmates (trophallaxis). Between 90 and 95% of the dry weight of aphid honeydew is various sugars, while the remaining matter includes vitamins, minerals, and amino acids. Aphid honeydew can provide an abundant food source for ants (aphids in the genus Tuberolachnus can secrete more honeydew droplets per hour than their body weight) and for some ants, aphids may be their only source of food. In these circumstances, ants may supplement their honeydew intake by preying on the aphids once the aphid populations have reached certain densities. In this way, ants can gain extra protein and ensure efficient resource extraction by maintaining honeydew flow rates that do not exceed the ants' collection capabilities. Even with some predation by ants, aphid colonies can reach larger densities with tending ants than colonies without. Ants have been observed to tend large "herds" of aphids, protecting them from predators and parasitoids. Aphid species associated with ants often have reduced structural and behavioral defenses.

Ants engage in associations with other honeydew-producing hemipterans, such as scale insects (Coccidae), mealybugs (Pseudococcidae), and treehoppers (Membracidae). These associations are usually facultative and opportunistic; some are obligate, as with inquilines that can only survive inside ant nests. Ants may provide other services in exchange for hemipteran honeydew. Some ants bring hemipteran larvae into the ant nests and rear them along with their own ant brood.

=== Lycaenid butterflies ===
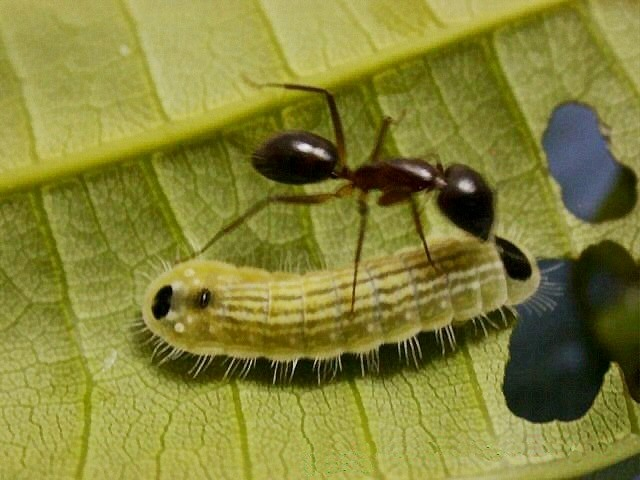
Ant tending a Lycaenid caterpillar

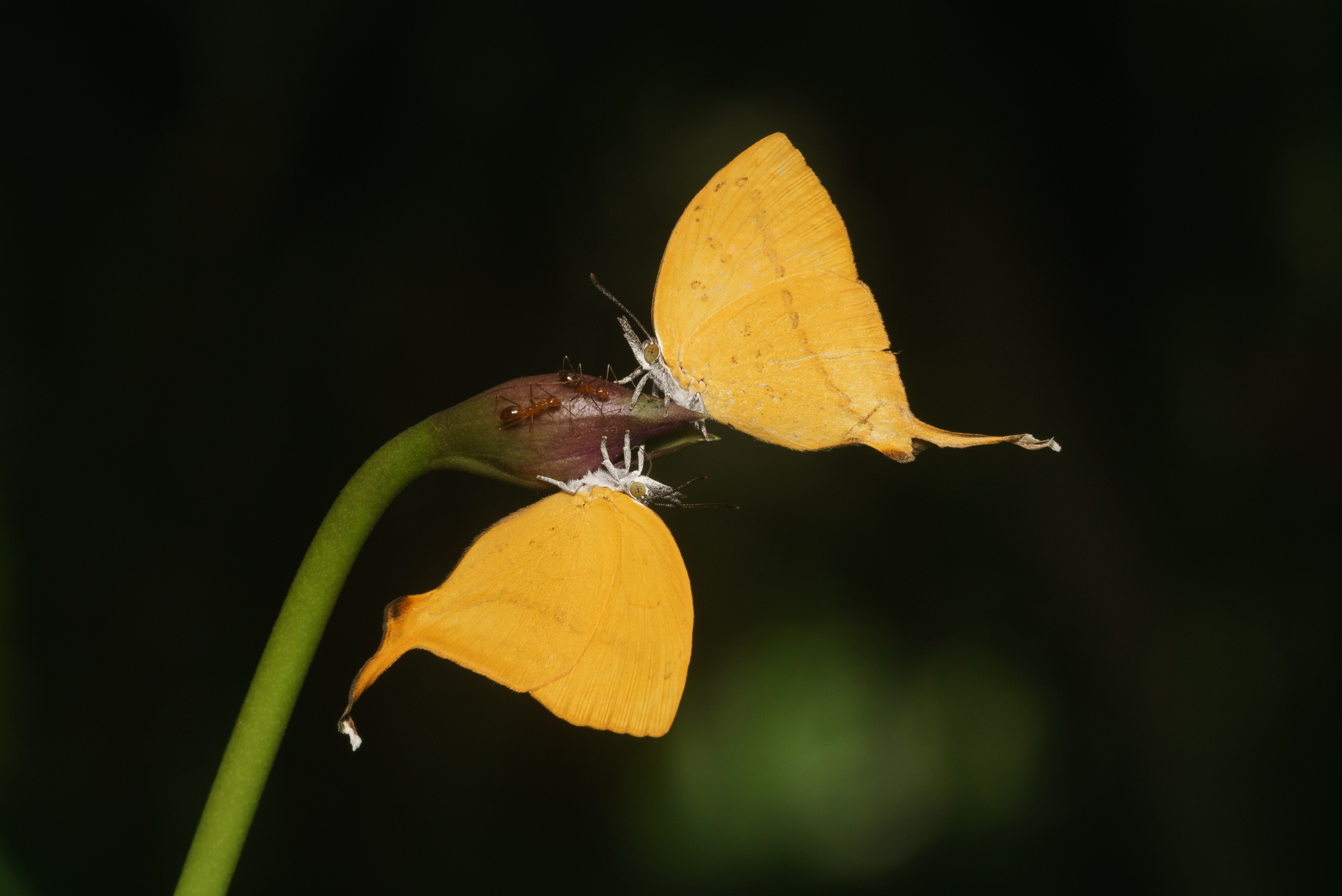
Loxura atymnus eats nectar from extrafloral nectaries stimulated by the ants. Here they are on a Philippine orchid bud with some yellow crazy ants.

Lycaenid caterpillars do not continually excrete honeydew, so they have evolved specialized organs that secrete chemicals to feed and appease ants. The secretions are a mixture of sugar and amino acids, a combination more attractive to the ants than either component in its own. The secretions of Narathura japonica caterpillars contain components that cause behavior alteration in the ants, with a reduction in the locomotory activity of caterpillar attendants, increased aggression and protectiveness by Pristomyrmex punctatus ants. This suggests that the association is parasitic rather than mutualistic. Because caterpillars do not automatically pass honeydew, they must be stimulated to secrete droplets, and do so in response to antennation, the drumming or stroking of the caterpillar's body by the ants' antennae. Some caterpillars possess specialized receptors that allow them to distinguish between ant antennation and contact from predators and parasites. Others produce acoustic signals that agitate ants, making them more active and likely better defenders of the larvae.

Ants protect lycaenid larvae from predatory insects (including other ants) and parasitoid wasps. For example, larvae of Glaucopsyche lygdamus tended by Formica podzolica are much less likely to be infected by parasitoids (9%–12%, against 33% when unprotected). These interactions come at an energetic cost to the butterfly: ant-tended larvae reach smaller adult sizes than untended individuals due to the costs of appeasing ants. Ants are important partners for butterflies at all stages of their lifecycles. For example, adult females of lycaenid butterflies such as Jalmenus evagoras, preferentially oviposit on plants where ant partners are present, possibly by using ants' own chemical cues. While ant attendance has been widely documented in lycaenids and in riodinid butterflies such as Eurybia elvina, many other butterflies and moths associate with ants.

=== Multiple levels of myrmecophily ===
Many trophobiotic ants can simultaneously maintain associations with multiple species. Ants that interact with myrmecophilous insects and myrmecophytes are highly associated; species that are adapted to interact with one of these myrmecophiles may switch among them depending on resource availability and quality. Of the ant genera that include species that associate with ant plants, 94% also include species that associate with trophobionts. In contrast, ants that are adapted to cultivate fungus (leaf cutter ants, tribe Attini) do not possess the morphological or behavioral adaptations to switch to trophobiotic partners. Many ant mutualists can exploit these multispecies interactions to maximize the benefits of myrmecophily. For example, some plants host aphids instead of investing in EFNs, which may be more energetically costly depending on local food availability. The presence of multiple interactors can strongly influence the outcomes of myrmecophily, often in unexpected ways.

== Significance in ecology ==
Mutualisms are geographically ubiquitous, found in all organismic kingdoms, and play a major role in all ecosystems. Combined with the fact that ants are one of the most dominant lifeforms on earth, myrmecophily clearly plays a significant role in the evolution and ecology of diverse organisms, and in the community structure of many terrestrial ecosystems.

=== Evolution of positive interactions ===
Ant associations have been influential in the ecological success, diversity, and persistence of myrmecophiles. Myrmecophily has arisen independently many times. Because multiple gains (and perhaps losses) of myrmecophilous adaptations have happened, the evolutionary sequence of events in most lineages is unknown.

The costs and benefits of mutualistic interactions vary drastically according to local species composition and abundance, variation in nutrient requirements and availability, host plant quality, presence of alternative food sources, abundance and composition of predator and parasitoid species, and abiotic conditions, making analysis difficult. Variation in external factors can result in interactions that shift along a continuum of mutualism, commensalism, and even parasitism. In almost all mutualisms, the costs and benefits are asymmetrical (favoring one partner). This asymmetry leads to "cheating", in which one partner evolves strategies to receive benefits without providing services in return. For example, some lycaenid larvae are taken into ant nests, where they prey on ant brood and offer no services to the ants. Other lycaenids parasitize ant-plant relationships by feeding on plants that are tended by ants, apparently immune to ant attack because of their own appeasing secretions. Hemipterophagous lycaenids are parasitic on ant-hemipteran associations. Much remains to be learned about the mechanisms that maintain mutualism as an evolutionarily stable interaction.

=== Species coexistence ===
Mutualisms play an important role in structuring communities. Myrmecophily allows species that might otherwise be antagonists or competitors to coexist. Engaging in ant associations is first and foremost a method of avoiding predation by ants. For example, the caterpillars of lycaenid butterflies are an ideal source of food for ants: they are slow-moving, soft-bodied, and highly nutritious, yet they have evolved complex structures to appease ant aggression and to elicit protective services from the ants. To explain why ants cooperate with other species as opposed to preying on them, two related hypotheses have been proposed; cooperation either provides ants with resources that are otherwise difficult to find, or it ensures the long-term availability of those resources.

=== Community structure ===
At both small and large scales, mutualisms influence patterns of species richness, distribution, and abundance. Myrmecophilous interactions help to determine community structure by influencing inter- and intraspecific competition; regulating population densities of arthropods, fungi, and plants; determining arthropod species assemblages; and influencing trophic dynamics. In tropical forests, ant mutualisms structure food webs, as ants control entire communities of arthropods in forest canopies. Myrmecophily has been key in the ecological success of ants. Ant biomass and abundance in many ecosystems exceeds that of their potential prey, suggesting that myrmecophily supports larger populations of ants than would otherwise be possible. By providing refugia and improving habitats for many species, ants are dominant ecosystem engineers.

=== Model system ===
Myrmecophilous interactions provide an important model system for exploring ecological and evolutionary questions regarding coevolution, plant defense theory, food web structure, species coexistence, and evolutionarily stable strategies. Because many myrmecophilous relationships are easily manipulated and tractable, they allow for testing and experimentation that may not be possible in other interactions. Therefore, they provide ideal model systems in which to explore the magnitude, dynamics, and frequency of mutualism in nature.

== See also ==
- Myrmecochory
- Myrmecophagy
- Myrmecophyte
- Myrmecotrophy
- Myrmecomorphy (ant mimicry)

== Sources ==
- Hölldobler, Bert; Wilson, Edward O. (1990). The Ants. Cambridge, Massachusetts: Harvard University Press. ISBN 0-674-04075-9.
- Hölldobler, Bert; Wilson, Edward O. (1998). Journey to the Ants. Harvard University Press. ISBN 978-0-674-25458-9.
- Stadler, Bernhard; Dixon, Anthony F. G. (2008-04-07). Mutualism. Cambridge; New York: Cambridge University Press. ISBN 978-0-521-86035-2. OCLC 166382298.
- Wilson, Edward O. (1971). The insect societies. Cambridge, Mass.: Belknap Press of Harvard University Press. ISBN 0-674-45490-1. OCLC 199513.
