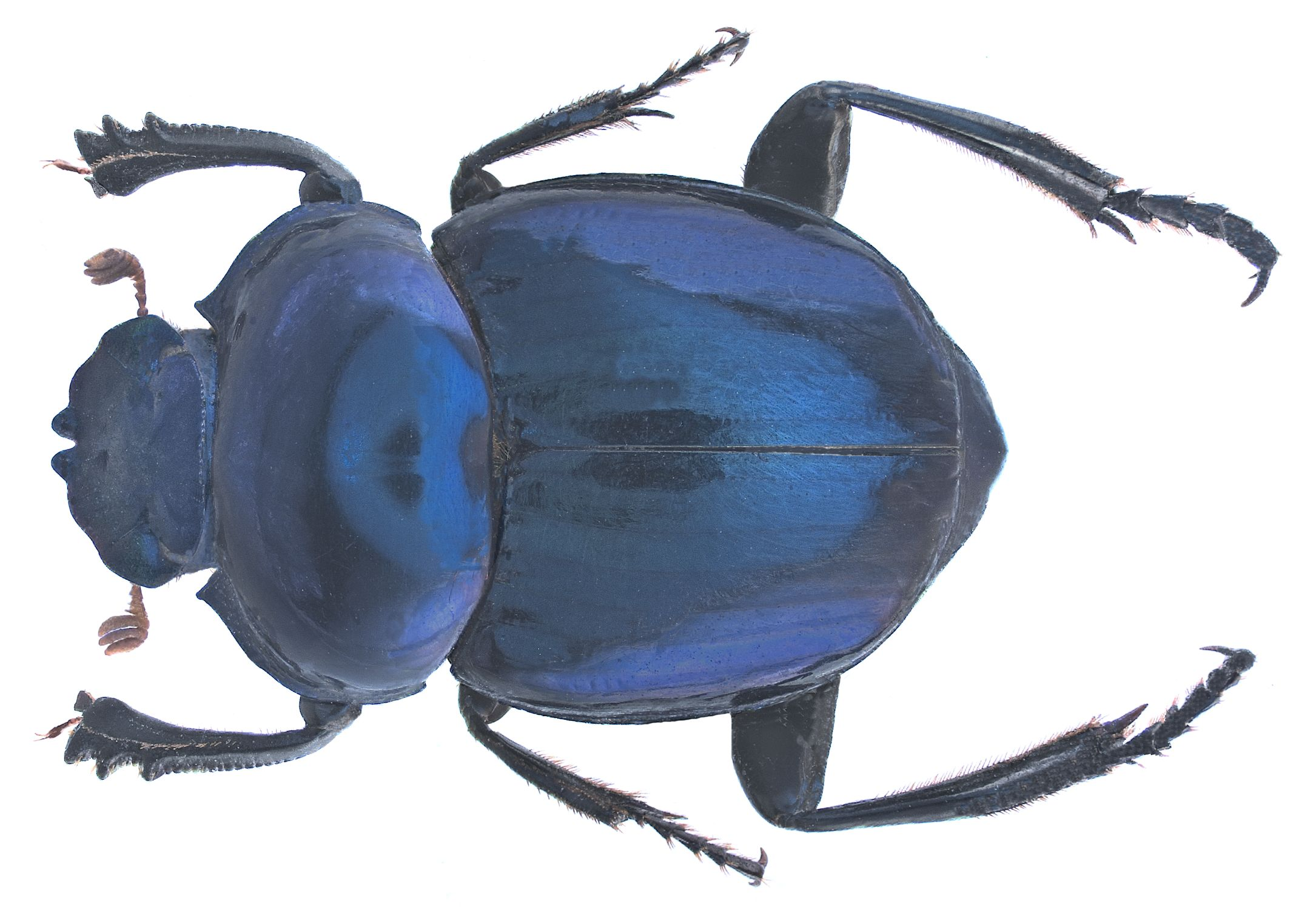
- Canthon smaragdulus Fabricius, 1781

Scientific classification
- Kingdom: Animalia
- Phylum: Arthropoda
- Class: Insecta
- Order: Coleoptera
- Suborder: Polyphaga
- Infraorder: Scarabaeiformia
- Family: Scarabaeidae
- Subfamily: Scarabaeinae
- Tribe: Deltochilini; Lacordaire, 1856

Genera
- See text

= Deltochilini =

Tribe of beetles

Deltochilini (or Canthonini) is a tribe of scarab beetles, in the dung beetle subfamily (Scarabaeinae). Members of this group vary widely in size (2–33 mm long) and shape, but were thought to be derived from an ancient ball-rolling lineage. The outer edges of the front tibiae have less than four teeth. The grouping based on these characteristics has, however, been found to have little phylogenetic validity, and the placement of several genera in the tribe is likely to change.

== Taxonomy ==
There has been some controversy regarding the valid name for this tribe. Deltochilini is the senior name, and has precedence under the ICZN, but in 2006, Smith suggested that the name Canthonini, though junior, might be preserved under Code Article 35.5, which can be used to preserve junior names if they are higher in taxonomic rank than the senior names of constituent taxa. However, this Article does not apply when two names are competing for the same taxonomic rank (as in this case, both being used at the rank of tribe), so this conclusion has been reversed by subsequent classifications, restoring Deltochilini as the valid name.

The tribe comprises about 800 species in 120 genera: They constitute a high proportion of the dung beetle diversity in many parts of the world; more than 35% of the genera in the Americas, Australia, Madagascar and many islands. However, in the Afro-Eurasian regions, they make up less than 20% of the genera.

== Genera ==
- Agamopus
- Aleiantus
- Aliuscanthoniola
- Amphistomus
- Anachalcos
- Anisocanthon
- Anomiopus
- Anonthobium
- Aphengoecus
- Apotolamprus
- Aptenocanthon
- Apterepilissus
- Arachnodes
- Aulacopris
- Baloghonthobium
- Bohepilissus
- Boletoscapter
- Byrrhidium
- Caeconthobium
- Cambefortantus
- Canthochilum
- Canthodimorpha
- Canthon
- Canthonella
- Canthonidia
- Canthonosoma
- Canthotrypes
- Cephalodesmius
- Circellium
- Coproecus
- Cryptocanthon
- Deltepilissus
- Deltochilum
- Diorygopyx
- Drogo
- Dwesasilvasedis
- Endroedyolus
- Epactoides
- Epilissus
- Epirinus
- Eudinopus
- Falsignambia
- Gyronotus
- Hammondantus
- Hansreia
- Holocanthon
- Ignambia
- Janssensantus
- Lambroma
- Lepanus
- Macropanelus
- Madaphacosoma
- Malagoniella
- Megathopa
- Megathoposoma
- Melanocanthon
- Mentophilus
- Monoplistes
- Namakwanus
- Nanos
- Nebulasilvius
- Nesovinsonia
- Ochicanthon
- Odontoloma
- Oficanthon
- Onthobium
- Outenikwanus
- Panelus
- Paracanthon
- Parvuhowdenius
- Peckolus
- Penalus
- Phacosomoides
- Pseudignambia
- Pseudocanthon
- Pseudonthobium
- Pseudophacosoma
- Pycnopanelus
- Saphobiamorpha
- Saphobius
- Sauvagesinella
- Scybalocanthon
- Scybalophagus
- Sikorantus
- Silvaphilus
- Sinapisoma
- Sphaerocanthon
- Streblopus
- Sylvicanthon
- Tanzanolus
- Temnoplectron
- Tesserodon
- Tesserodoniella
- Tetraechma
- Vulcanocanthon
- Xenocanthon
- Zonocopris

== Ecology ==
Most species are coprophagous, but some feed on carrion, others on fungi, and the smaller species may utilize leaf litter (saprophagous). They are largely diurnal.
