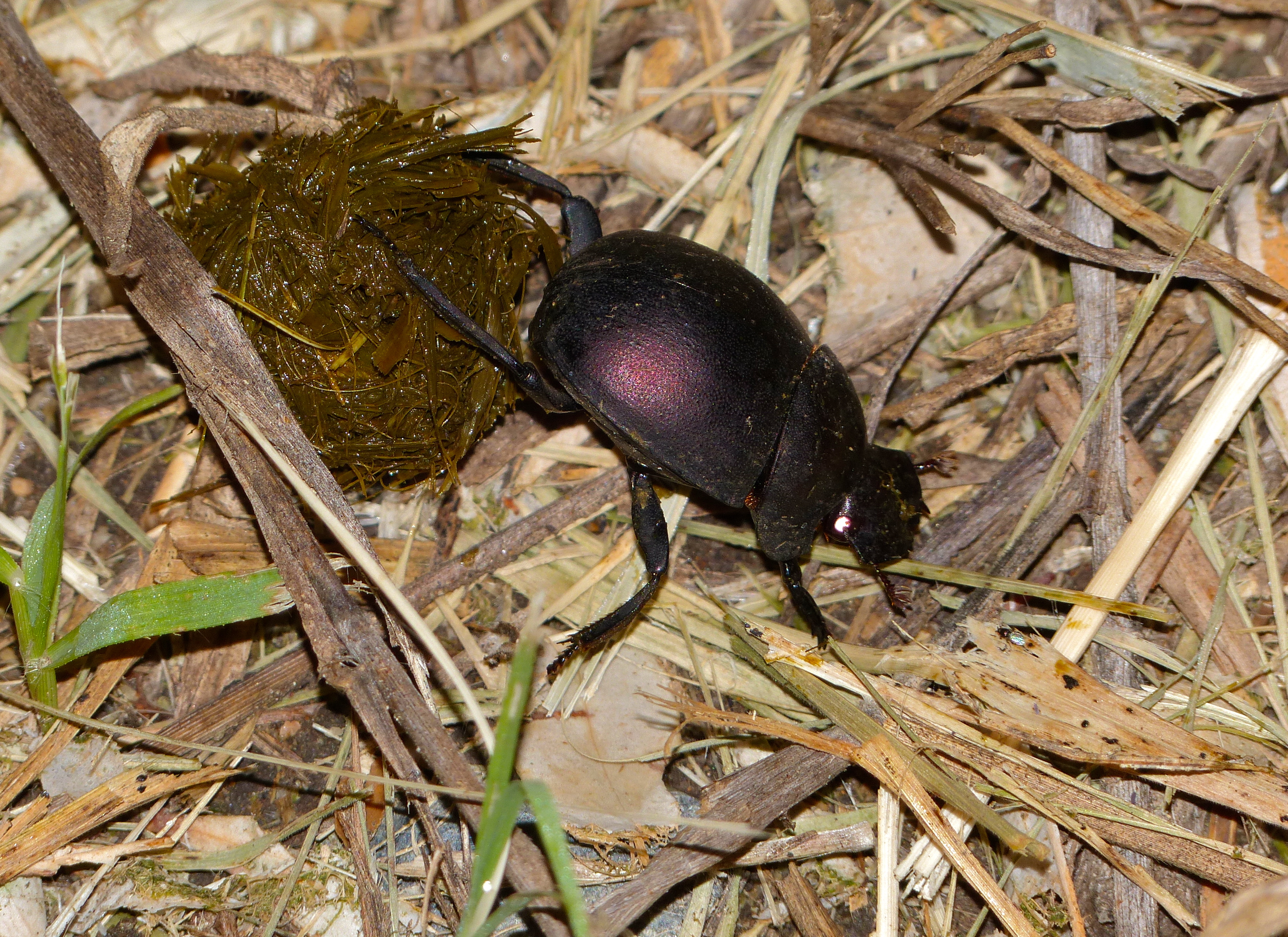
- Anachalcos convexus rolling a ball at night

Scientific classification
- Kingdom: Animalia
- Phylum: Arthropoda
- Class: Insecta
- Order: Coleoptera
- Suborder: Polyphaga
- Infraorder: Scarabaeiformia
- Family: Scarabaeidae
- Tribe: Deltochilini
- Genus: Anachalcos; Hope, 1837

Species
- Anachalcos convexus; Anachalcos aurescens; Anachalcos cupreus; Anachalcos janssensi; Anachalcos pembensis; Anachalcos procerus; Anachalcos revoili; Anachalcos schultzi; Anachalcos suturalis

= Anachalcos =

Genus of beetles

Anachalcos is a genus of Scarabaeidae or scarab beetles in the superfamily Scarabaeoidea. It is one of only three genera of African dung beetles that have been observed rolling balls; the other two are Epirinus and Circellium.
