= Nanno (disambiguation) =

Nanno is a municipality in the province of Trento in Italy.

Nanno can also refer to:

- Nannō, Gifu, a town in Japan
- Yoko Minamino or Nanno (born 1967), Japanese actress and singer
  - Yōkō Minamino, a fictional character from the manga series Shonan Junai Gumi, whose nickname is "Nanno"
- Nanno (woman) (Ναννώ), a female flute player described in several poems of Mimnermus, a Greek elegiac poet
- Nanno Nanigashi, an archaic form of the Japanese equivalent of John Doe
- Nanno de Groot, an artist known for abstract expressionism
- Nanno (cephalopod), a genus of prehistoric cephalopod

== See also ==
- Nano
