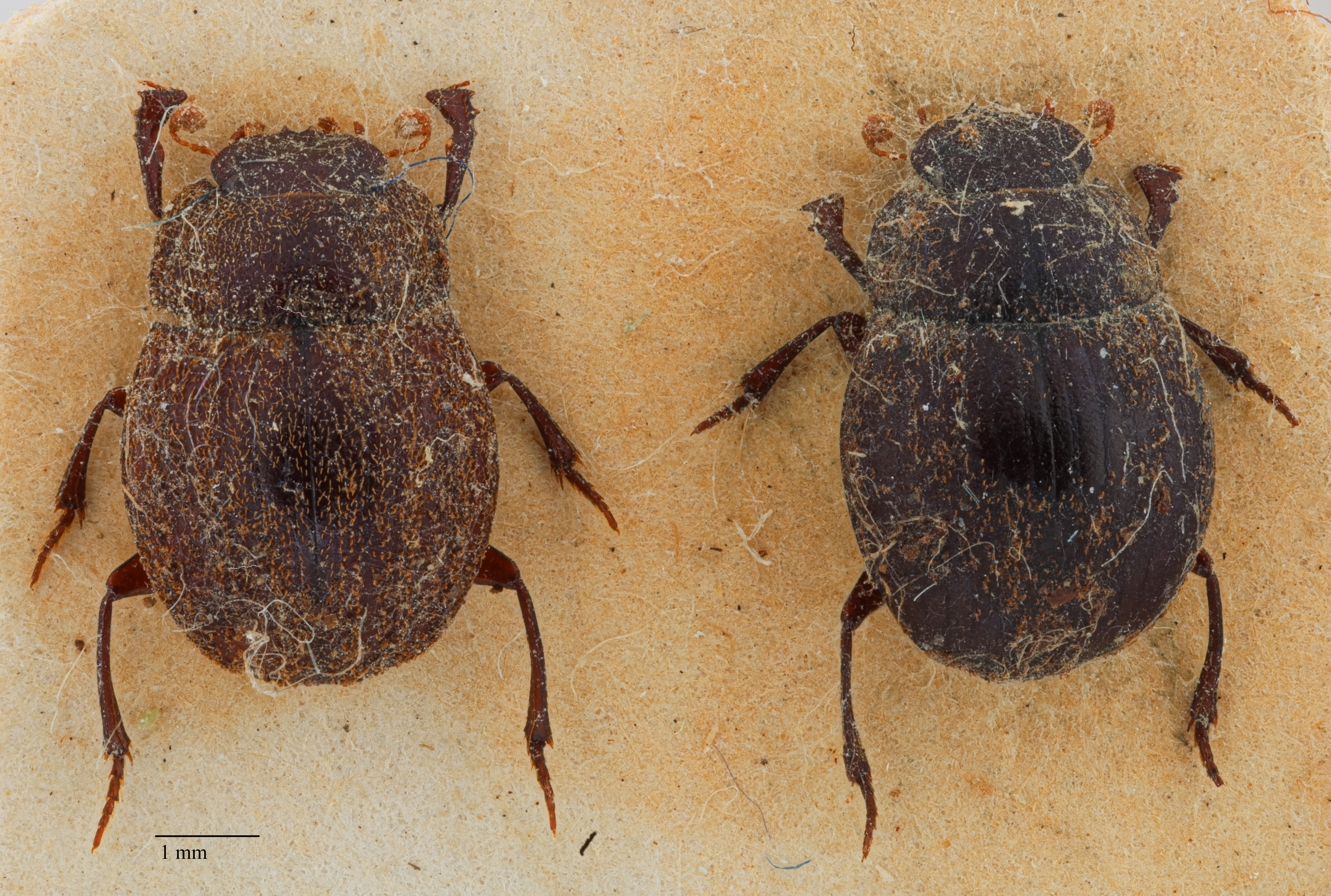

Scientific classification
- Kingdom: Animalia
- Phylum: Arthropoda
- Class: Insecta
- Order: Coleoptera
- Suborder: Polyphaga
- Infraorder: Scarabaeiformia
- Family: Scarabaeidae
- Genus: Saphobius
- Species: S. inflatipes

Binomial name
- Saphobius inflatipes Broun, 1893

= Saphobius inflatipes =

Species of beetle

Saphobius inflatipes is one of several species of dung beetle that are endemic to New Zealand. It belongs to the tribe Deltochilini of the family Scarabaeidae. It was first described by Thomas Broun in 1893. In the Auckland region, it is most abundant during the summer and autumn seasons.
