= Nanos =

Nanos may refer to:

- Nanos (beetle), a genus in the tribe Canthonini
- Nanos (plateau), a plateau in the Dinaric Alps, Slovenia
- Nanos, Vipava, a settlement in the Municipality of Vipava, Slovenia
- Nanos Research, a Canadian polling firm
- nanos, a gene responsible for axis specification in fruit flies (Drosophila embryogenesis)
- Nanos family proteins, a family of proteins homologous to the fruit fly gene/protein including NANOS1.
- Nanos, an illegitimate homonym genus for Nanum (bicosoecid)

== People with the surname ==
- Apostolos Nanos, Olympic archer
- George Peter Nanos, former director of the Los Alamos National Laboratory
- Nikita Nanos, founder of Nanos Research
