= Canthonella gomezi =

Conservation status
- Endangered (IUCN 3.1)

Scientific classification
- Kingdom: Animalia
- Phylum: Arthropoda
- Clade: Pancrustacea
- Class: Insecta
- Order: Coleoptera
- Suborder: Polyphaga
- Infraorder: Scarabaeiformia
- Family: Scarabaeidae
- Genus: Canthonella
- Species: C. gomezi

Binomial name
- Canthonella gomezi (Halffter & Martinez, 1968)

Species of beetle

Canthonella gomezi is a species of beetle in family Scarabaeidae. It is endemic to Venezuela, and is restricted to cloud forest habitat in the Cordillera Central.

It is included in the IUCN Red List of Threatened Species and the Venezuelan Red Book of Fauna.
