= Versicorpus =

Scientific classification
- Kingdom: Animalia
- Phylum: Arthropoda
- Class: Insecta
- Order: Coleoptera
- Suborder: Polyphaga
- Infraorder: Scarabaeiformia
- Family: Scarabaeidae
- Genus: Versicorpus; Deschodt, Davis & Scholtz, 2011
- Species: V. erongoensis

Binomial name
- Versicorpus erongoensis Deschodt, Davis & Scholtz, 2011

Genus of beetles

Versicorpus is a genus of Scarabaeidae or scarab beetles in the superfamily Scarabaeoidea. Versicorpus is endemic to Namibia and is only found at the Mount Erongo. This is a monotypic genus with only one species, Versicorpus erongoensis.

Versicorpus probably live in close association with rock hyraxes (Procavia capensis Pallas). These Hyraxes have communal toilets or dung middens. These middens are probably a stable and dependable food source for Versicorpus in a resource scarce environment. Versicorpus erongoensis is a flightless dung beetle that is probably closely related to Dicranocara Deschodt & Scholtz and Namakwanus Scholtz & Howden.
