= Anisocanthon =

Scientific classification
- Kingdom: Animalia
- Phylum: Arthropoda
- Class: Insecta
- Order: Coleoptera
- Suborder: Polyphaga
- Infraorder: Scarabaeiformia
- Family: Scarabaeidae
- Tribe: Deltochilini
- Genus: Anisocanthon; Martínez & Pereira, 1956

Species
- A. pygmaeus

Genus of beetles

Anisocanthon is a genus of Scarabaeidae or scarab beetles in the superfamily Scarabaeoidea.

== Species ==
- Anisocanthon pygmaeus (Gillet, 1911)
- Anisocanthon sericinus (Harold, 1868)
- Anisocanthon strandi (Balthasar, 1939)
- Anisocanthon villosus (Harold, 1868)
