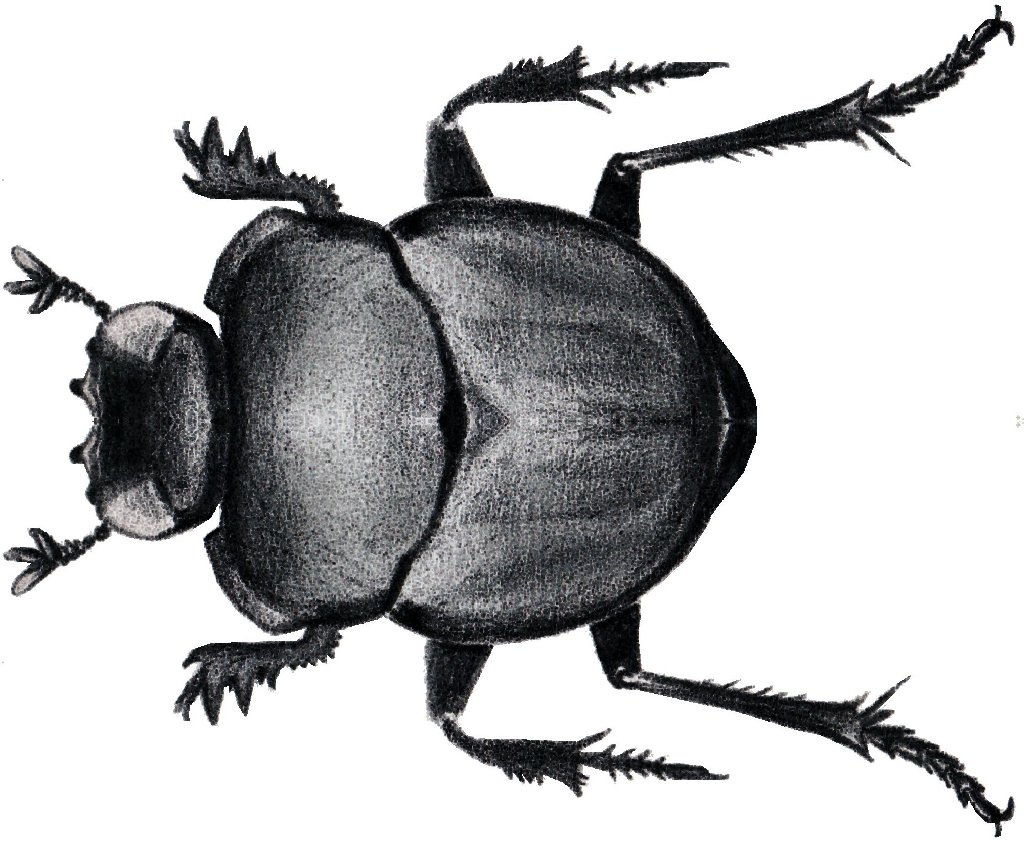

Scientific classification
- Kingdom: Animalia
- Phylum: Arthropoda
- Class: Insecta
- Order: Coleoptera
- Suborder: Polyphaga
- Infraorder: Scarabaeiformia
- Family: Scarabaeidae
- Genus: Melanocanthon
- Species: M. bispinatus

Binomial name
- Melanocanthon bispinatus (Robinson, 1941)

= Melanocanthon bispinatus =

Species of beetle

Melanocanthon bispinatus, the tumble bug, is a species of dung beetle in the family Scarabaeidae.
