= Ochicanthon cingalensis =

Scientific classification
- Kingdom: Animalia
- Phylum: Arthropoda
- Class: Insecta
- Order: Coleoptera
- Suborder: Polyphaga
- Infraorder: Scarabaeiformia
- Family: Scarabaeidae
- Genus: Ochicanthon
- Species: O. cingalensis

Binomial name
- Ochicanthon cingalensis (Arrow, 1931)

Synonyms
- Phacosoma cingalensis Arrow, 1931

Species of beetle

Ochicanthon cingalensis, is a species of dung beetle found in Sri Lanka.

== Description ==
This small oval species has an average length of about 4.5 mm.
