= Ochicanthon ceylonicus =

Scientific classification
- Kingdom: Animalia
- Phylum: Arthropoda
- Class: Insecta
- Order: Coleoptera
- Suborder: Polyphaga
- Infraorder: Scarabaeiformia
- Family: Scarabaeidae
- Genus: Ochicanthon
- Species: O. ceylonicus

Binomial name
- Ochicanthon ceylonicus Cuccodoro, 2011

Species of beetle

Ochicanthon ceylonicus, is a species of dung beetle found in Sri Lanka.

== Description ==
This small oval species has an average length of about 4.2 to 4.4 mm.
