= Melanocanthon granulifer =

Scientific classification
- Domain: Eukaryota
- Kingdom: Animalia
- Phylum: Arthropoda
- Class: Insecta
- Order: Coleoptera
- Suborder: Polyphaga
- Infraorder: Scarabaeiformia
- Family: Scarabaeidae
- Genus: Melanocanthon
- Species: M. granulifer

Binomial name
- Melanocanthon granulifer (Schmidt, 1920)

Species of beetle

Melanocanthon granulifer is a species of (formerly canthonini) in the beetle family Scarabaeidae.
