= Gyronotus schuelei =

Scientific classification
- Kingdom: Animalia
- Phylum: Arthropoda
- Class: Insecta
- Order: Coleoptera
- Suborder: Polyphaga
- Infraorder: Scarabaeiformia
- Family: Scarabaeidae
- Genus: Gyronotus
- Species: G. schuelei

Binomial name
- Gyronotus schuelei Moretto in Moretto & Perissinoto, 2013

Species of beetle

Gyronotus schuelei is a species of scarab beetle. The species was found in South Africa, and formally described in 2013. According to Sci-News, "Gyronotus beetles are regarded among the most endangered of the African scarab beetles because of their sensitivity to disturbance".
