= Nanum amicum =

Scientific classification
- Domain: Eukaryota
- Clade: Sar
- Clade: Stramenopiles
- Phylum: Bigyra
- Order: Bicosoecida
- Family: Pseudodendromonadidae
- Genus: Nanum; Cavalier-Smith 2013
- Species: N. amicum

Binomial name
- Nanum amicum (Kim et al. 2010) Cavalier-Smith 2013

Synonyms
- Nanos Kim et al. 2010 non Westwood 1847 (nomen illegitimum); Nanos amicus Kim et al. 2010 (nomen illegitimum)

Genus of single-celled organisms

Nanum is a genus of bicosoecids, a small group of unicellular flagellates, included among the heterokonts. It includes the sole species Nanum amicum, previously known as Nanos amicus but modified because the name Nanos was already occupied by a species of beetle.
