= Anisocanthon pygmaeus =

Conservation status
- Data Deficient (IUCN 3.1)

Scientific classification
- Kingdom: Animalia
- Phylum: Arthropoda
- Class: Insecta
- Order: Coleoptera
- Suborder: Polyphaga
- Infraorder: Scarabaeiformia
- Family: Scarabaeidae
- Genus: Anisocanthon
- Species: A. pygmaeus

Binomial name
- Anisocanthon pygmaeus (Gillet, 1911)

Synonyms
- Deltochilum pygmaeum Gillet, 1911

Species of beetle

Anisocanthon pygmaeus is a species of true dung beetle that is found in Entre Ríos, Santa Fe and Buenos Aires Provinces in Argentina, and is believed to also be found in Rio Grande do Sul in Brazil. It has not been recorded in the last 60 years.
