= Saphobius brouni =

Scientific classification
- Kingdom: Animalia
- Phylum: Arthropoda
- Class: Insecta
- Order: Coleoptera
- Suborder: Polyphaga
- Infraorder: Scarabaeiformia
- Family: Scarabaeidae
- Genus: Saphobius
- Species: S. brouni

Binomial name
- Saphobius brouni Paulian, 1935

Species of beetle

Saphobius brouni is one of several species of Scarabaeidae that are endemic to New Zealand.

== Taxonomy ==
This species was described in 1935 by Renaud Maurice Adrien Paulian.

== Description ==
This species is similar in colour to Saphobius curvipes, but has some slight differences in the morphology of the legs.

== Distribution ==
This species is only known from Hastwell in the North Island of New Zealand.
