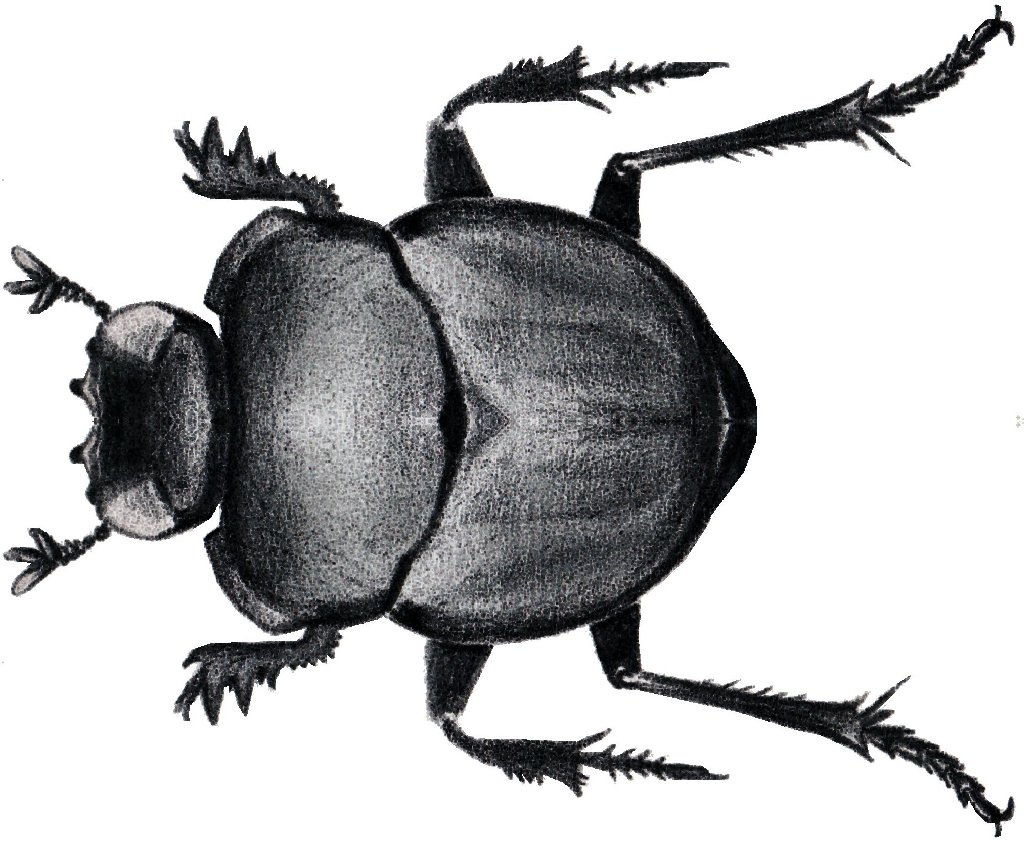
- Melanocanthon bispinatus

Scientific classification
- Kingdom: Animalia
- Phylum: Arthropoda
- Class: Insecta
- Order: Coleoptera
- Suborder: Polyphaga
- Infraorder: Scarabaeiformia
- Family: Scarabaeidae
- Subfamily: Scarabaeinae
- Tribe: Deltochilini
- Genus: Melanocanthon; Halffter, 1958

= Melanocanthon =

Genus of beetles

Melanocanthon is a genus of dung beetles in the family Scarabaeidae. There are at least 4 described species in Melanocanthon.

== Species ==
- Melanocanthon bispinatus (Robinson, 1941) (tumble bug)
- Melanocanthon granulifer (Schmidt, 1920)
- Melanocanthon nigricornis (Say, 1823)
- Melanocanthon punctaticollis (Schaeffer, 1915)
