= Mount Erongo =

Mountain in Namibia

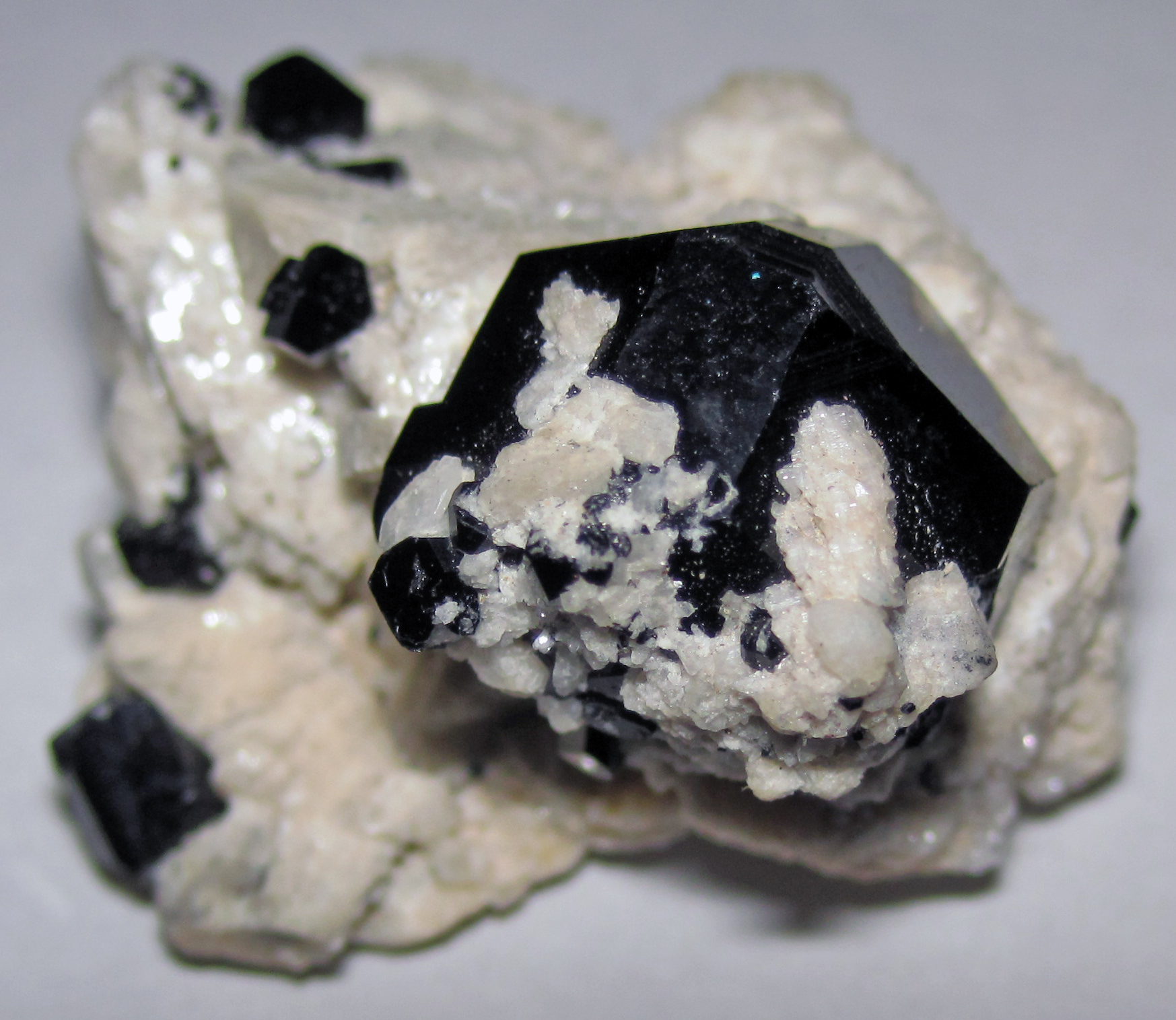
Tourmaline-feldspar-quartz rock, Mt. Erongo. This is a schorl tourmaline-rich sample from the Erongo Granite. The Erongo Granite is a subvolcanic ring dike, above an old volcano.

Mount Erongo (21º37'S 15º40'E) is a mountain of 2,350 metres northeast of Swakopmund in Erongo Region, Namibia. Like the Brandberg Mountain it is a granitic intrusion. It is the only place on Earth that Versicorpus erongoensis, a dung beetle species, occurs.
