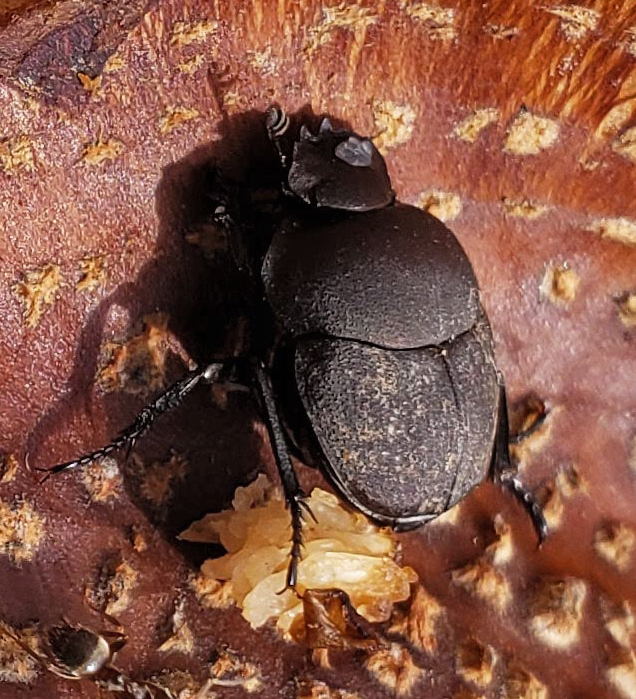
- Melanocanthon nigricornis, Wisconsin

Scientific classification
- Kingdom: Animalia
- Phylum: Arthropoda
- Class: Insecta
- Order: Coleoptera
- Suborder: Polyphaga
- Infraorder: Scarabaeiformia
- Family: Scarabaeidae
- Genus: Melanocanthon
- Species: M. nigricornis

Binomial name
- Melanocanthon nigricornis (Say, 1823)

Synonyms
- Ateuchus nigricornis Say, 1823

= Melanocanthon nigricornis =

Species of beetle

Melanocanthon nigricornis is a species of dung beetle in the family Scarabaeidae. It is found in the central United States.
