= Nano =

Nano, Nano-, NANO or NaNo may refer to:

== People ==
- Agnese Nano (born 1965), Italian actress
- Fatos Nano (1952–2025), Albanian socialist politician, Prime Minister of Albania
- Lourdes Flores Nano (born 1959), Peruvian politician
- Nano Mesa (born 1995), Spanish football forward Alexander Mesa Travieso
- Nano Omar, stage name of Swedish singer Nagi Jamal Omar (born 1986)
- Nano Riantiarno (1949–2023), Indonesian actor, director, and playwright
- Nano Rivas (born 1980), Spanish football defender Victoriano Rivas Álvaro
- Nano (Egyptian footballer) (born 1985), Egyptian football defender/midfielder Mohamed Mahmoud
- Nano (footballer, born 1982), Spanish football winger Fernando Macedo da Silva Rodilla
- Nano (footballer, born 1984), Spanish football defender Mariano González Maroto
- Nano (singer) (born 1988), Japanese-American J-pop singer

== Science and technology ==
- GNU nano, a text editor for Unix-like systems
- iPod Nano, a digital media player
- nano-, a metric prefix denoting a factor of 10^{−9}
- Nano (cryptocurrency)
- NANO (journal), an international peer-reviewed scientific journal
- Nano, an Arduino model (single-board microcontroller)
- Nano receiver, a type of wireless computer mouse technology
- Nanotechnology, a field of study dealing with nano-scale objects
- Radeon R9 Nano, a graphics card
- Silver Nano, an antibacterial technology
- VIA Nano, a central processing unit
- Microsoft Nano Server, an installation option for Windows Server 2016

== Transport ==
- Tata Nano, a city car
- Wuling Nano EV, a battery electric city car
- FlyNano Nano, a Finnish ultralight aircraft

== Fiction ==
- Nano Eiai, from the manga Kimi no koto ga Dai Dai Dai Dai Daisuki na 100-nin no Kanojo
- Nano Shinonome, a character in the Japanese comedy manga series Nichijou
- Nanos in FusionFall, small versions of characters that accompany the player and grant them special abilities
- Nano (comics), a member of the Fearsome Five from DC Comics

== Other uses ==
- Beretta Nano, a micro compact pistol
- Magnetic nano, (often nicknamed 'nano'), a tiny container used in geocaching
- NaNo, National Novel, related to the National Novel Writing Month

== See also ==
- Nanos (disambiguation)
