= Malagoniella =

Scientific classification
- Domain: Eukaryota
- Kingdom: Animalia
- Phylum: Arthropoda
- Class: Insecta
- Order: Coleoptera
- Suborder: Polyphaga
- Infraorder: Scarabaeiformia
- Family: Scarabaeidae
- Tribe: Deltochilini
- Genus: Malagoniella; Martínez, 1961

Genus of beetles

Malagoniella is a genus of (formerly canthonini) in the beetle family Scarabaeidae. There are about 10 described species in Malagoniella.

== Species ==
These 10 species belong to the genus Malagoniella:

- Malagoniella argentina (Gillet, 1911)
- Malagoniella astyanax (Olivier, 1789)
- Malagoniella bicolor (Guérin-Méneville, 1840)
- Malagoniella chalybaea (Blanchard, 1846)
- Malagoniella coerulea (Balthasar, 1939)
- Malagoniella cupreicollis (Waterhouse, 1890)
- Malagoniella lanei (Lange, 1945)
- Malagoniella magnifica (Balthasar, 1939)
- Malagoniella puncticollis (Blanchard, 1846)
- Malagoniella virens (Harold, 1869)
