= Pseudodendromonadidae =

Scientific classification
- Domain: Eukaryota
- Clade: Sar
- Clade: Stramenopiles
- Phylum: Bigyra
- Order: Bicosoecida
- Clade?: Cyathobodoniae
- Family: Pseudodendromonadidae; Cavalier-Smith, 1993

Type genus
- Pseudodendromonas Bourelly, 1953

Genera
- Pseudodendromonas; Cyathobodo; Paramonas; Nanum; Nerada; Filos; Otto; Regin; Siluaniidae; Siluania; Adriamonas

Synonyms
- Pseudodendromonadaceae Hibberd, 1985 emend. Cavalier-Smith, 2006 (nomen invalidum)

Group of protists

Pseudodendromonadidae is a group of the bicosoecids, a small group of unicellular flagellates, included among the heterokonts that was proposed in 1993. It was previously used to include the genera Pseudodendromonas and Cyathobodo, but now it includes also the genera Siluania, Adriamonas, Paramonas, Nanum, Nerada, Filos, Otto and Regin. Previously used similar names are Pseudodendromonadida, Pseudodendromonadales (nom. inval.) and Pseudodendromonadaceae (nom. inval.). Otto and Regin were recovered as pseudodendromonads only in a preliminary analysis in 2025, but they were already recovered in Pseudodendromonadidae in 2014.
