= Anachalcos convexus =

Scientific classification
- Kingdom: Animalia
- Phylum: Arthropoda
- Class: Insecta
- Order: Coleoptera
- Suborder: Polyphaga
- Infraorder: Scarabaeiformia
- Family: Scarabaeidae
- Genus: Anachalcos
- Species: A. convexus

Binomial name
- Anachalcos convexus Boheman, 1857

Species of beetle

Anachalcos convexus is a species of scarab beetle in the genus Anachalcos.

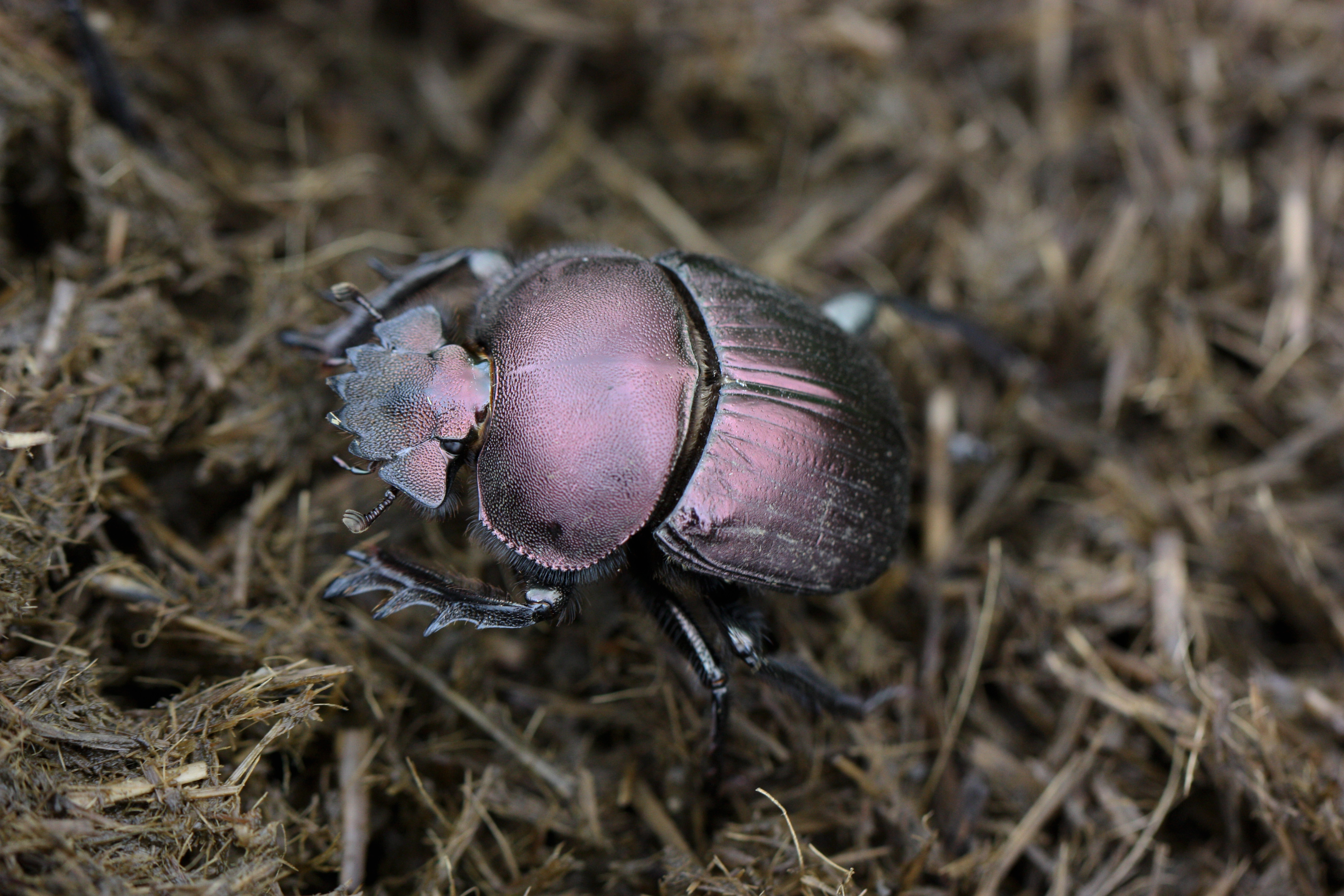
Phinda Private Game Reserve Kwa-Zulu Natal South Africa

The sequence of images shows a sequence of the beetle rolling a dung ball. It does this to navigate.

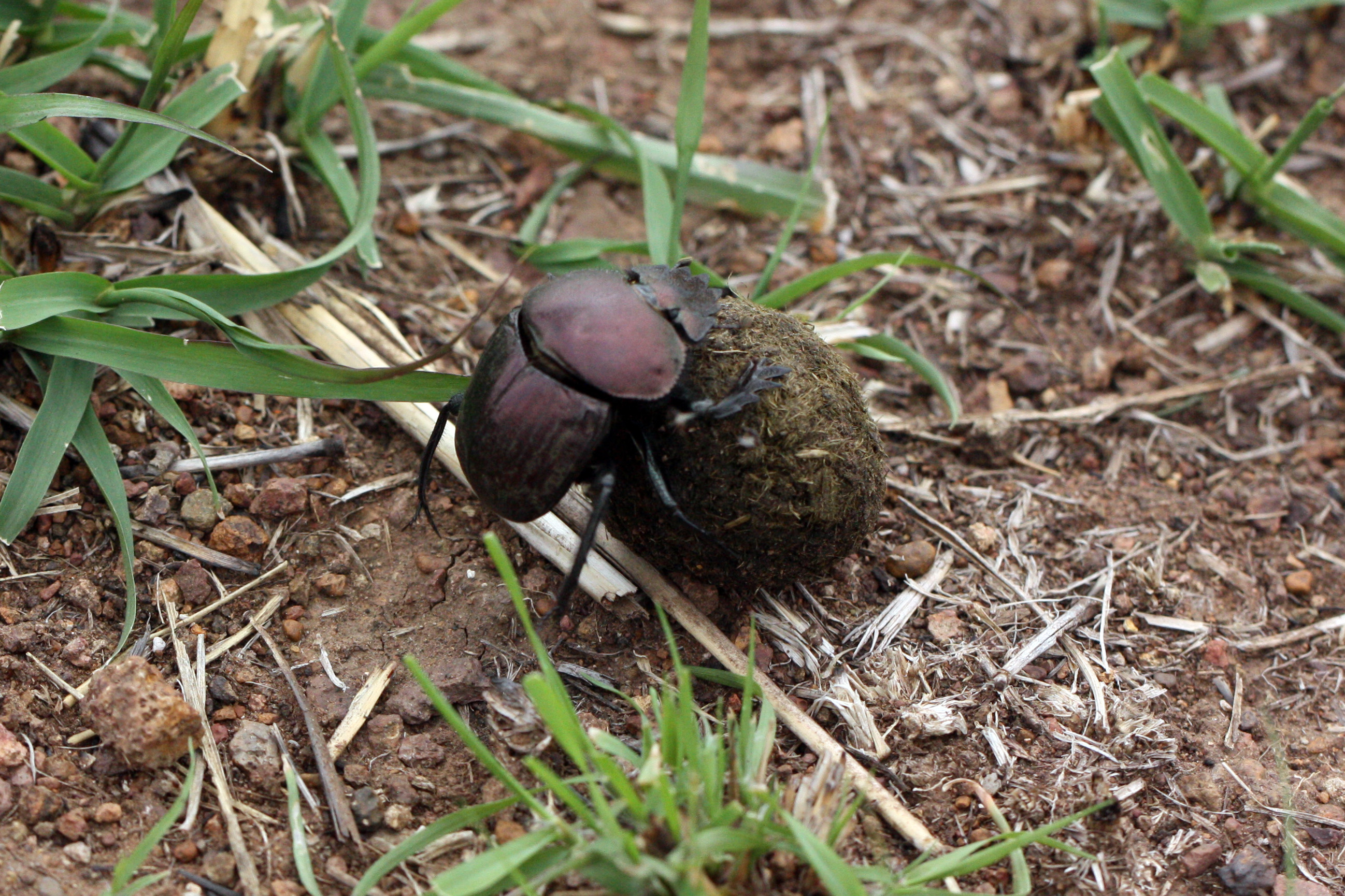
the beetle climbs onto the ball

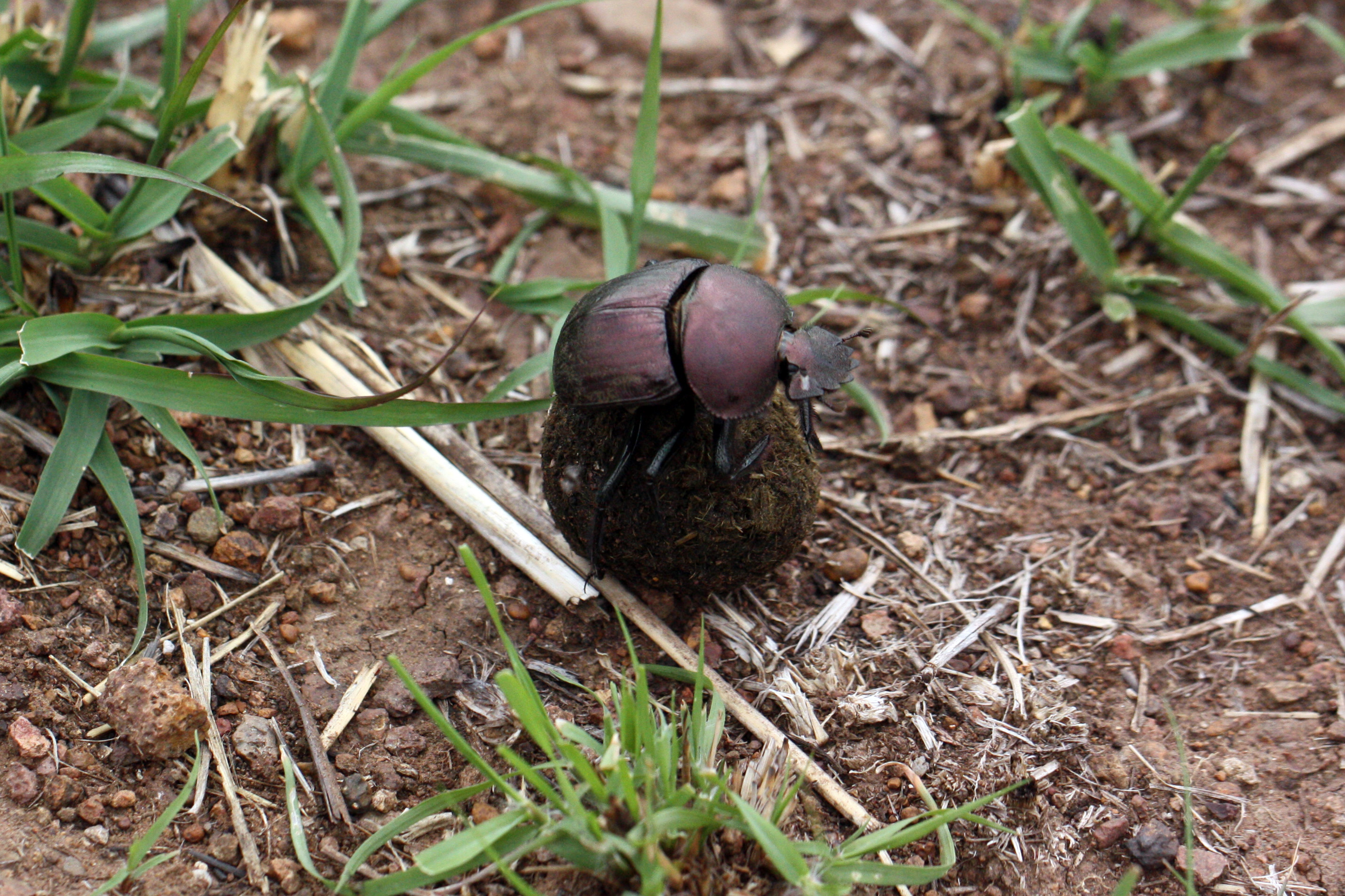
the beetle starts a 360 degree turn

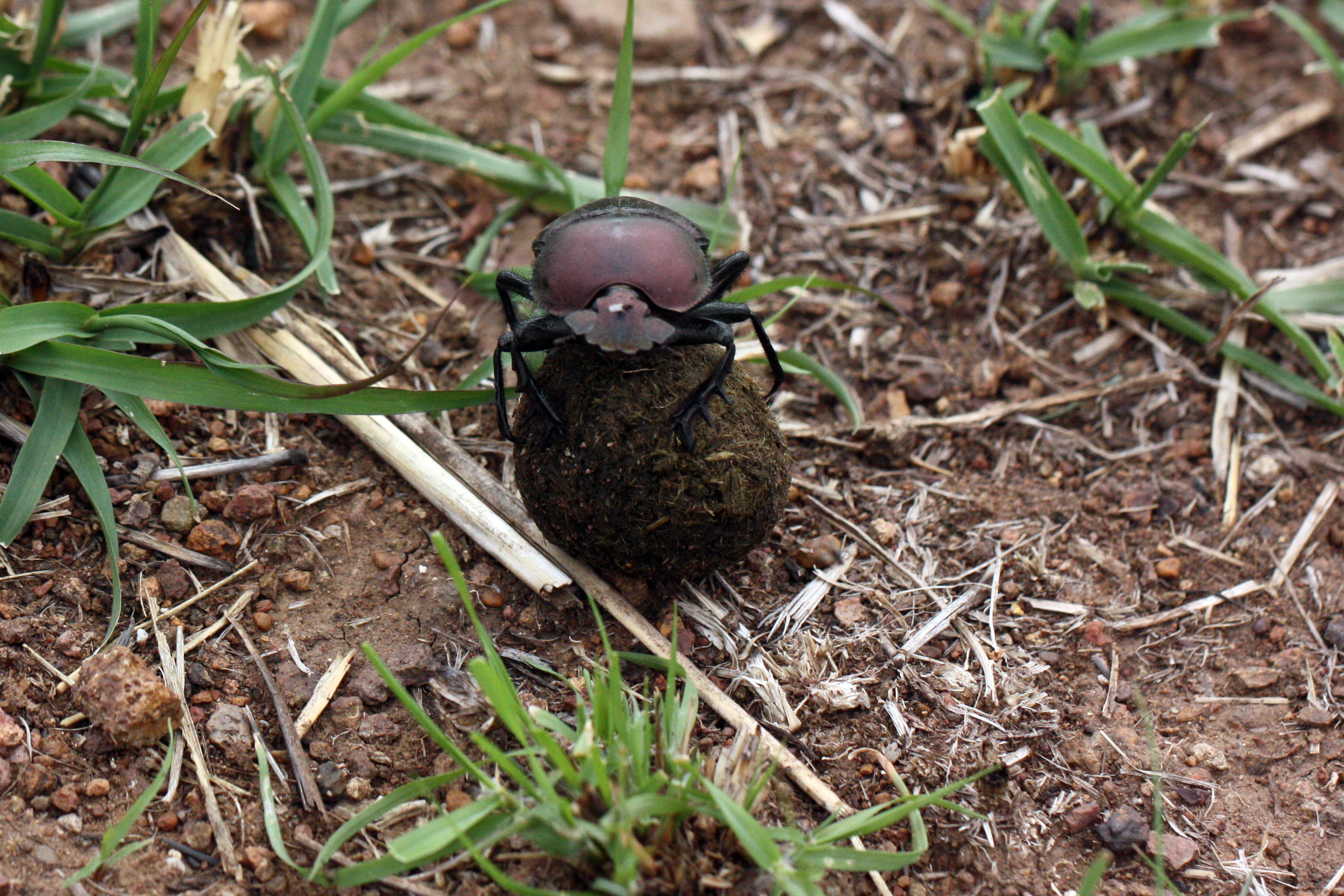
the beetle continues the 360 degree turn

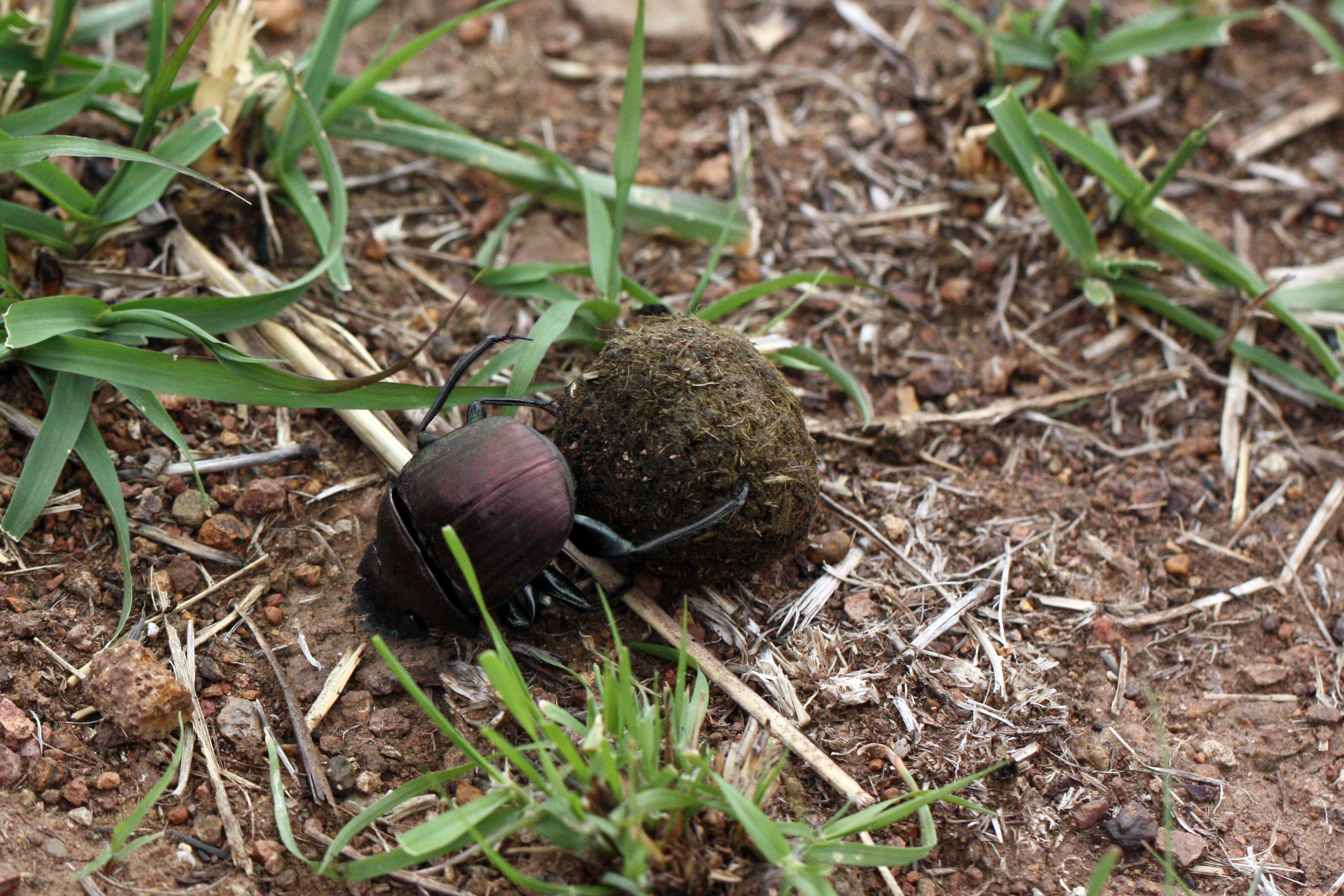
the beetle continues rolling the ball with its hind legs
