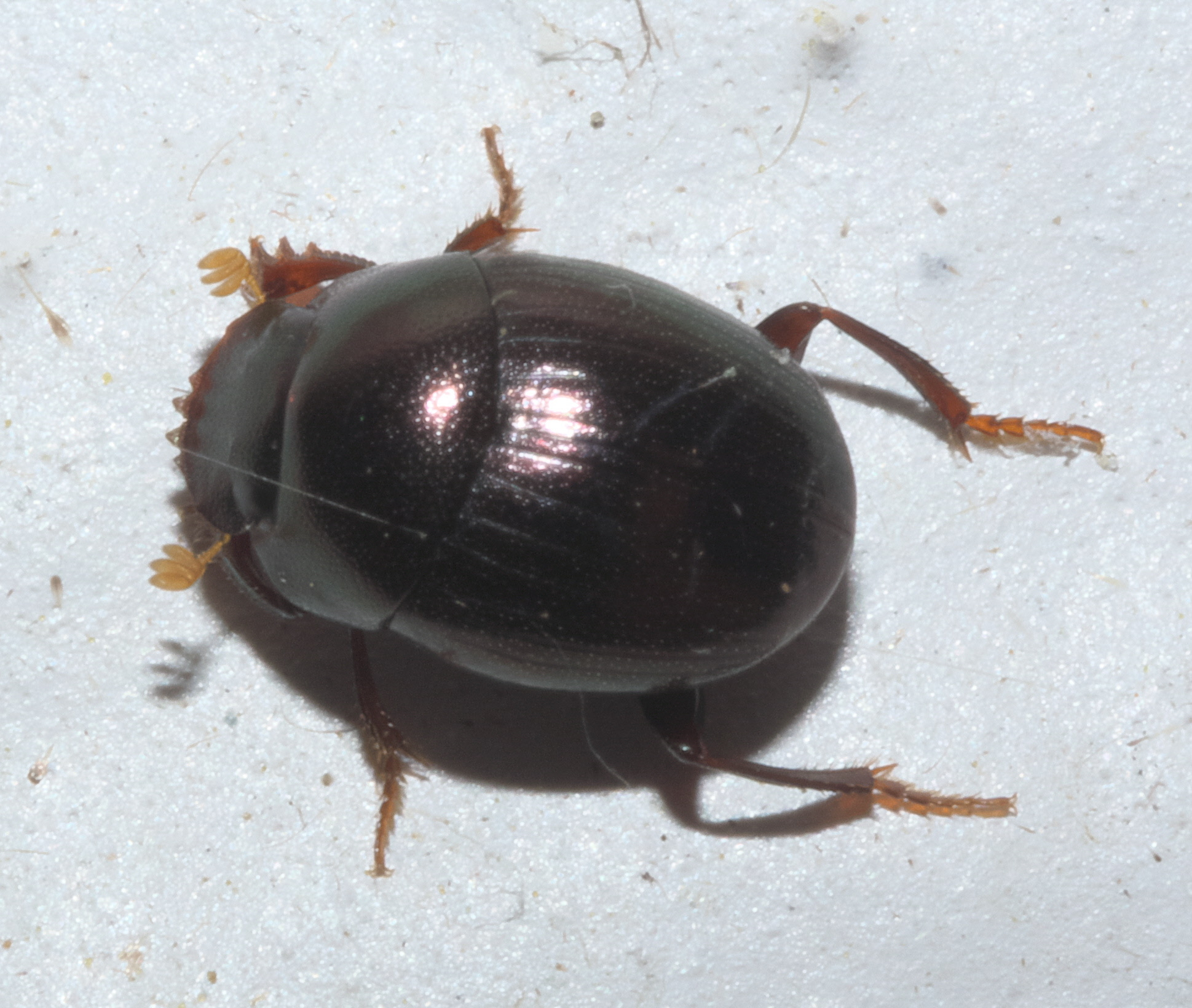
- Pseudocanthon perplexus

Scientific classification
- Domain: Eukaryota
- Kingdom: Animalia
- Phylum: Arthropoda
- Class: Insecta
- Order: Coleoptera
- Suborder: Polyphaga
- Infraorder: Scarabaeiformia
- Family: Scarabaeidae
- Tribe: Deltochilini
- Genus: Pseudocanthon; Bates, 1887

Synonyms
- Opiocanthon Paulian, 1947

= Pseudocanthon =

Genus of beetles

Pseudocanthon is a genus of (formerly canthonini) in the beetle family Scarabaeidae. There are about nine described species in Pseudocanthon.

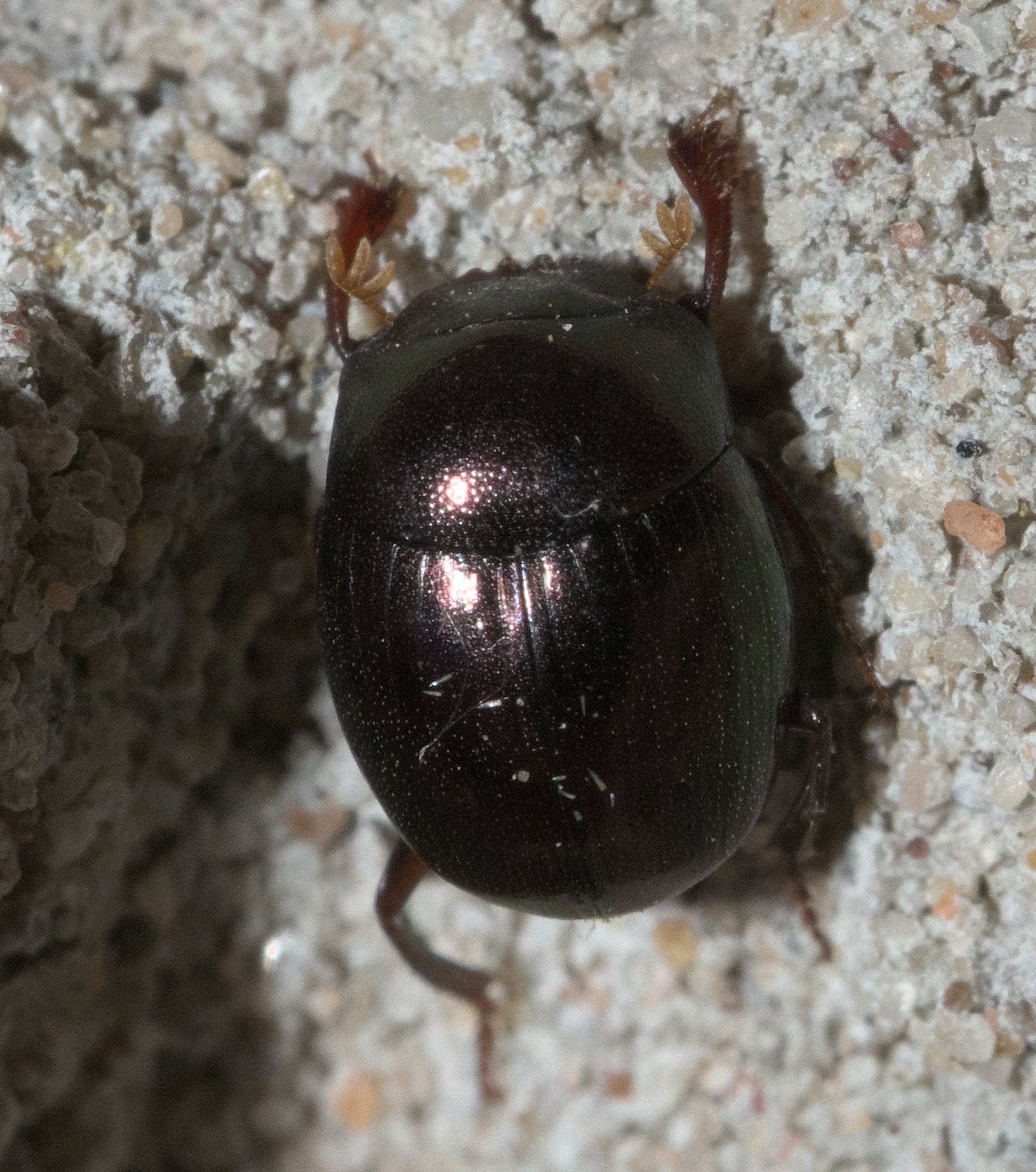
Pseudocanthon perplexus

== Species ==
These nine species belong to the genus Pseudocanthon:

- Pseudocanthon caeranus Matthews, 1966
- Pseudocanthon chlorizans (Bates, 1887)
- Pseudocanthon iuanalaoi Matthews, 1966
- Pseudocanthon ivanalaoi Matthews
- Pseudocanthon jamaicensis Matthews, 1966
- Pseudocanthon perplexus (LeConte, 1847) (four-toothed dung beetle)
- Pseudocanthon sylvaticus Matthews, 1966
- Pseudocanthon vitraci (Fleutiaux & Sallé, 1889)
- Pseudocanthon xanthurus (Blanchard, 1846)
