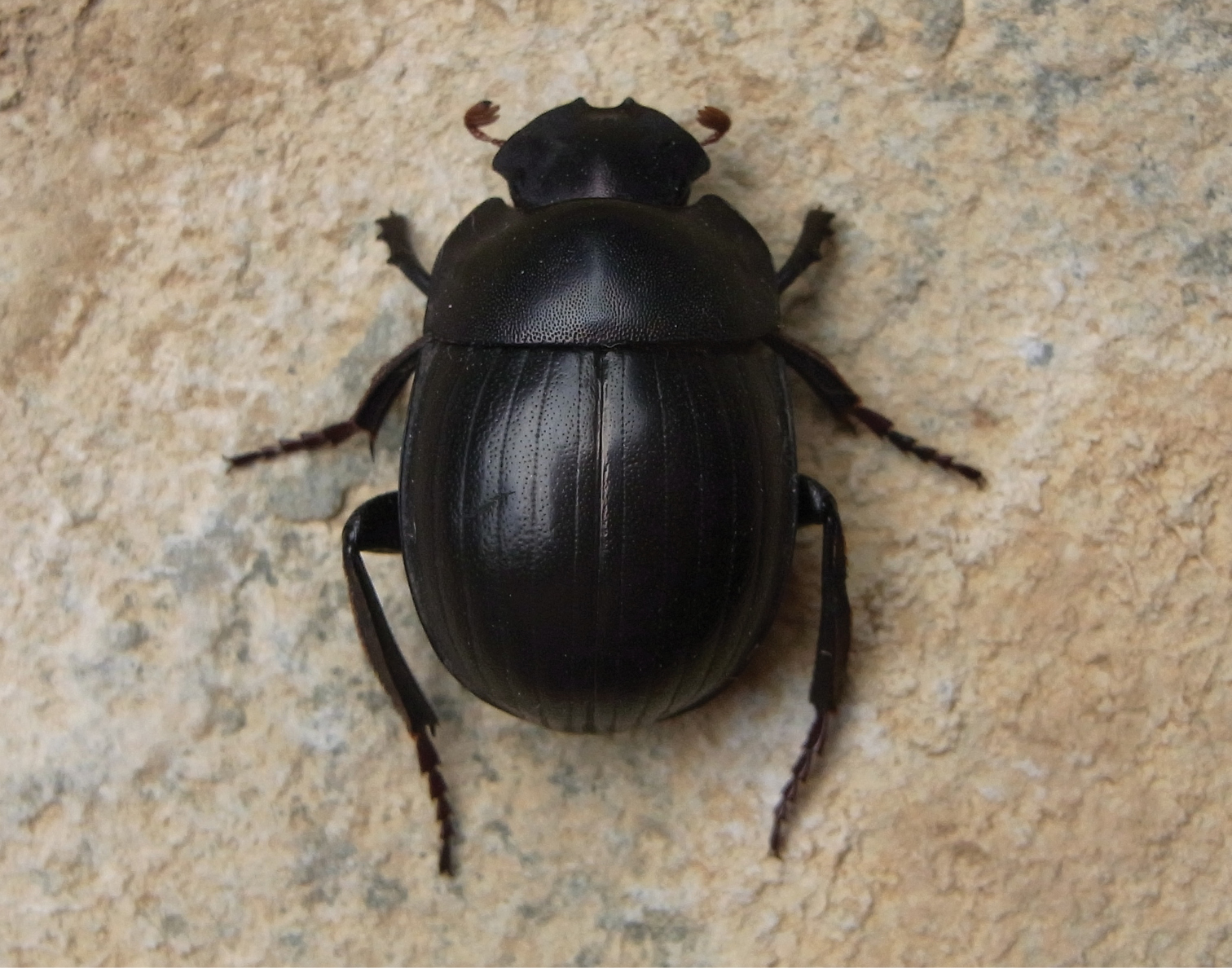
- Gyronotus perissinottoi

Scientific classification
- Kingdom: Animalia
- Phylum: Arthropoda
- Class: Insecta
- Order: Coleoptera
- Suborder: Polyphaga
- Infraorder: Scarabaeiformia
- Family: Scarabaeidae
- Subfamily: Scarabaeinae
- Tribe: Deltochilini
- Genus: Gyronotus van Lansberge, 1874

Species
- See text

= Gyronotus =

Genus of beetles

Gyronotus is a genus of scarab beetles.

== Species ==
Species accepted within the Gyronotus include:

- Gyronotus carinatus
- Gyronotus dispar
- Gyronotus fimetarius
- Gyronotus glabrosus
- Gyronotus mulanjensis
- Gyronotus perissinottoi
- Gyronotus pumilus
- Gyronotus schuelei
