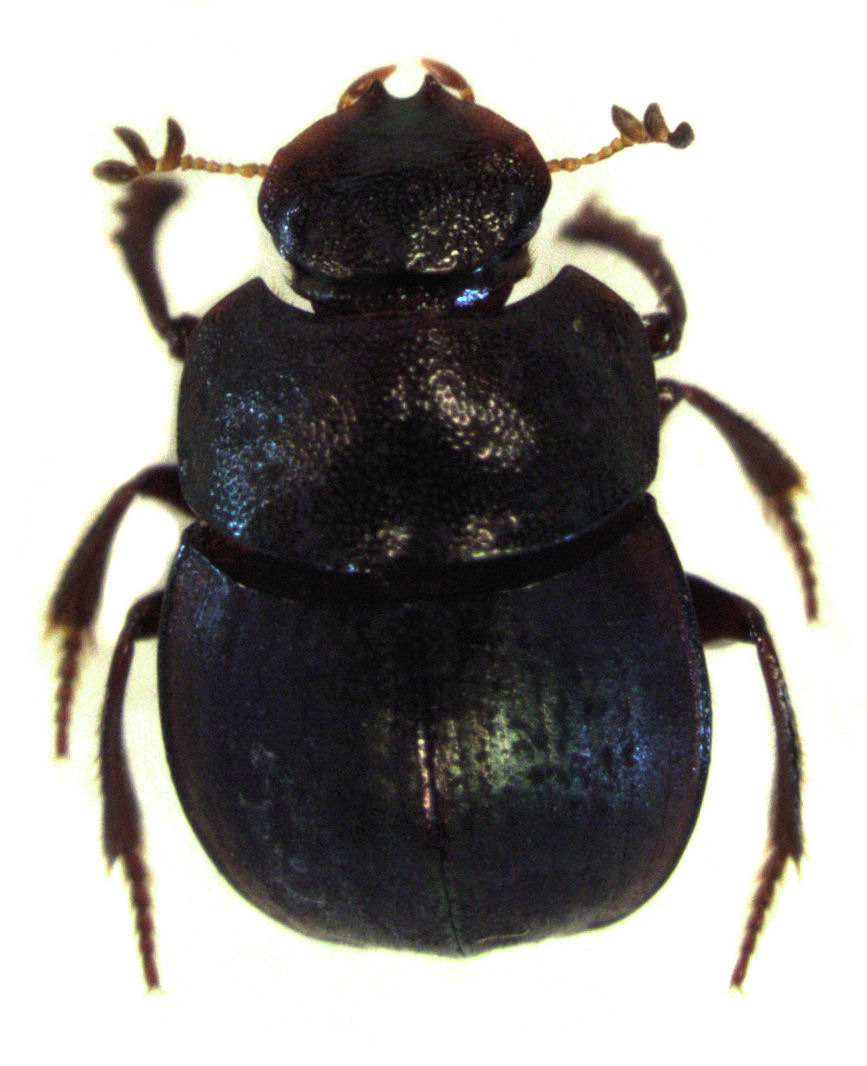
- Saphobius edwardsi

Scientific classification
- Kingdom: Animalia
- Phylum: Arthropoda
- Clade: Pancrustacea
- Class: Insecta
- Order: Coleoptera
- Suborder: Polyphaga
- Infraorder: Scarabaeiformia
- Family: Scarabaeidae
- Subfamily: Scarabaeinae
- Tribe: Deltochilini
- Genus: Saphobius; Sharp, 1873

= Saphobius =

Genus of beetles

Saphobius is a genus of dung beetles in the tribe Deltochilini of the subfamily Scarabaeinae. They are endemic to New Zealand, with Saphobius edwardsi being most widespread. They are small in size, flightless, forest dwelling and nocturnal, which is unusual for dung beetles.

Dung beetles are typically associated with mammal faeces, but prior to human habitation, New Zealand lacked land mammals other than three species of bats. This lack of mammal faeces has been suggested as the reason for the low diversity of dung beetles in New Zealand when compared to the rest of the world. Olfaction studies and pitfall trap baiting trials have shown that chicken carcasses and squid are highly attractive to Saphobius, which may reflect the evolution of the genus on an island abundant with bird species, in particular sea birds.

== Taxonomy ==
The New Zealand Organisms Register lists these species.

- Saphobius brouni (Paulian, 1935)
- Saphobius curvipes (Broun, 1893)
- Saphobius edwardsi (Sharp, 1873)
- Saphobius fulvipes (Broun, 1893)
- Saphobius fuscus (Broun, 1893)
- Saphobius inflatipes (Broun, 1893)
- Saphobius laticollis (Broun, 1914)
- Saphobius lepidus (Broun, 1912)
- Saphobius lesnei (Paulian, 1935)
- Saphobius nitidulus (Broun, 1880)
- Saphobius setosus (Sharp, 1886)
- Saphobius squamulosus (Broun, 1886)
- Saphobius tibialis (Broun, 1895)
- Saphobius wakefieldi (Sharp, 1877)
