= Malagoniella astyanax =

Scientific classification
- Kingdom: Animalia
- Phylum: Arthropoda
- Clade: Pancrustacea
- Class: Insecta
- Order: Coleoptera
- Suborder: Polyphaga
- Infraorder: Scarabaeiformia
- Family: Scarabaeidae
- Genus: Malagoniella
- Species: M. astyanax

Binomial name
- Malagoniella astyanax (Olivier, 1789)

Species of beetle

Malagoniella astyanax is a species of (formerly canthonini) in the beetle family Scarabaeidae. It is found in South America.

== Subspecies ==
These five subspecies belong to the species Malagoniella astyanax:

- Malagoniella astyanax astyanax (Olivier, 1789)
- Malagoniella astyanax columbica (Harold, 1867)
- Malagoniella astyanax polita (Halffter, Pereira & Martinez, 1960)
- Malagoniella astyanax punctatostriata (Blanchard, 1846)
- Malagoniella astyanax yucateca (Harold, 1863)
