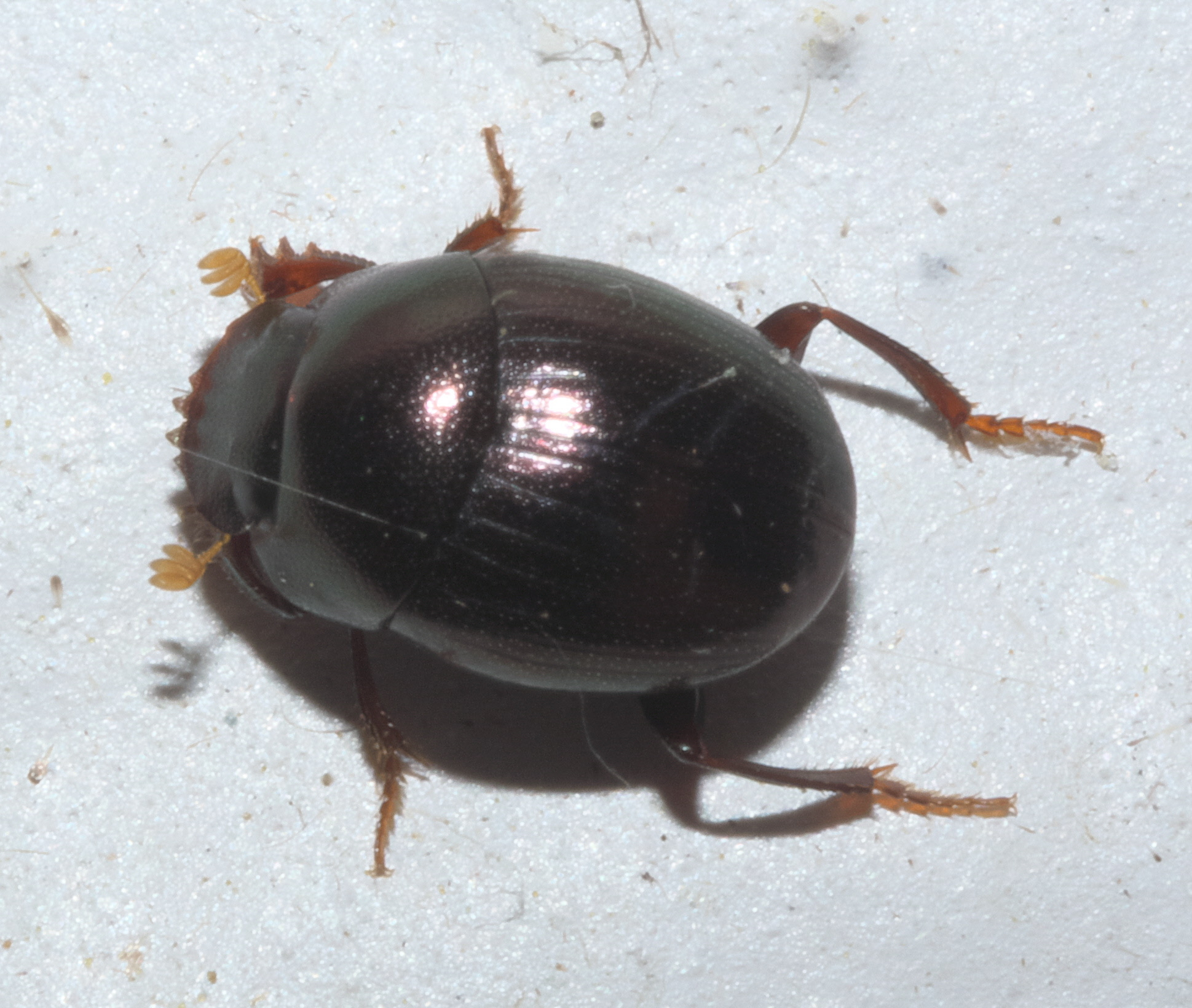

Scientific classification
- Kingdom: Animalia
- Phylum: Arthropoda
- Class: Insecta
- Order: Coleoptera
- Suborder: Polyphaga
- Infraorder: Scarabaeiformia
- Family: Scarabaeidae
- Genus: Pseudocanthon
- Species: P. perplexus

Binomial name
- Pseudocanthon perplexus (LeConte, 1847)

= Pseudocanthon perplexus =

Species of beetle

Pseudocanthon perplexus, the four-toothed dung beetle, is a species of (formerly canthonini) in the family Scarabaeidae.

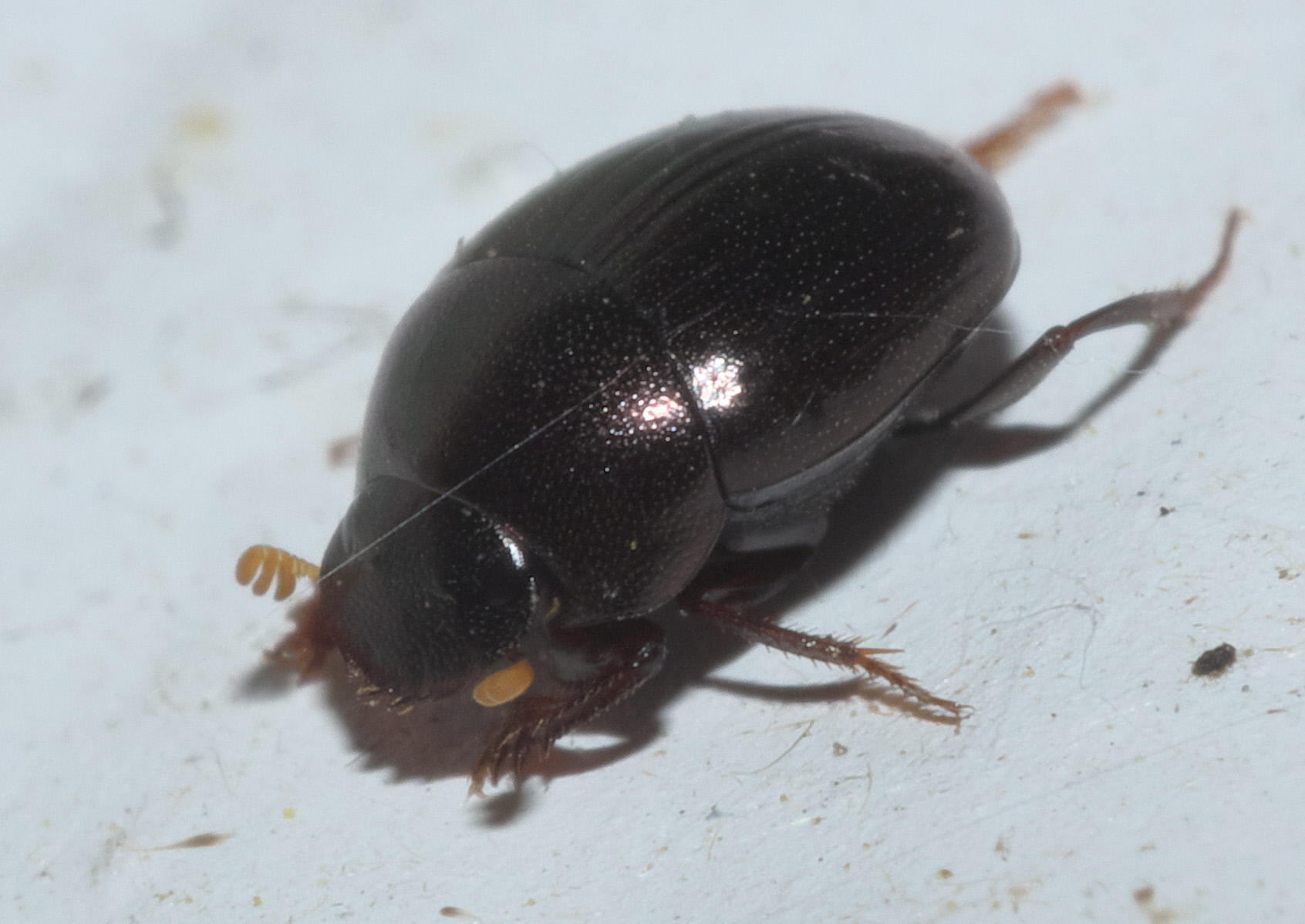
Four-toothed dung beetle, Pseudocanthon perplexus

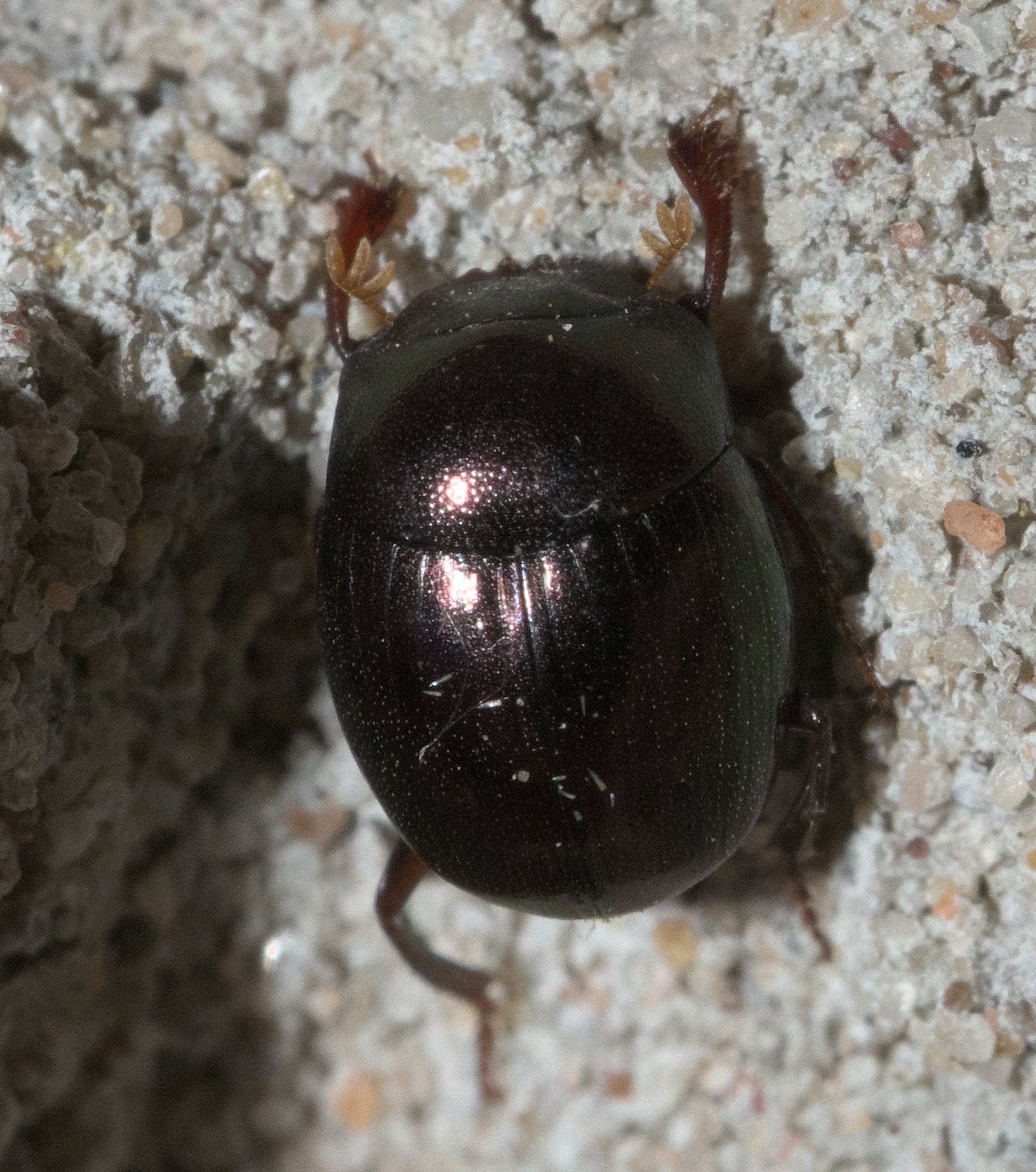
Four-toothed dung beetle, Pseudocanthon perplexus
