= Nanos (beetle) =

Scientific classification
- Kingdom: Animalia
- Phylum: Arthropoda
- Class: Insecta
- Order: Coleoptera
- Suborder: Polyphaga
- Infraorder: Scarabaeiformia
- Family: Scarabaeidae
- Subfamily: Scarabaeinae
- Tribe: Deltochilini
- Genus: Nanos; Westwood, 1842

Type species
- Circellium pygmaeum Castelnau, 1840

Species
- See text

Genus of beetles

Nanos is a genus of scarab beetles in the tribe Deltochilini.

== Species ==
- Nanos agaboides
- Nanos andreiae
- Nanos ankaranae
- Nanos antsalovaensis
- Nanos antsihanakensis
- Nanos ater
- Nanos bemarahaensis
- Nanos bicoloratus
- Nanos bimaculatus
- Nanos binotatus
- Nanos clypeatus
- Nanos constricticollis
- Nanos dubitatus
- Nanos fusconitens
- Nanos hanskii
- Nanos humbloti
- Nanos humeralis
- Nanos incertus
- Nanos magnus
- Nanos manomboensis
- Nanos manongorivoensis
- Nanos marojejyensis
- Nanos minutus
- Nanos mirjae
- Nanos mixtus
- Nanos nitens
- Nanos occidentalis
- Nanos peyrierasi
- Nanos pseudofusconitens
- Nanos pseudominutus
- Nanos pseudorubromaculatus
- Nanos pseudoviettei
- Nanos punctatus
- Nanos pygmaeus
- Nanos ranomafanaensis
- Nanos rubromaculatus
- Nanos rubrosignatus
- Nanos semicribrosus
- Nanos sinuatipes
- Nanos vadoni
- Nanos viettei
- Nanos viridissimus
