= Cephalodesmius =

Scientific classification
- Kingdom: Animalia
- Phylum: Arthropoda
- Class: Insecta
- Order: Coleoptera
- Suborder: Polyphaga
- Infraorder: Scarabaeiformia
- Family: Scarabaeidae
- Genus: Cephalodesmius

Genus of beetles

Cephalodesmius is a genus of Scarabaeidae or scarab beetles.

Currently only 3 species are recognised, all endemic to Australia. The beetles form bonded pairs and occupy permanent nests under the rainforest floor during their lifespan of only one year. The scarcity of dung in their habitat appears to have driven members of this genus to improvise a dung substitute from available materials. The male collects leaves and other plant material which is shredded by the female, turned into dung-like material and then shaped into small brood-balls housing the larvae. During the larval growth period the parents regularly add food to the brood-balls, behaviour previously unrecorded for dung beetles. The larvae also produce audible stridulation by rubbing the tip of the abdomen against the underside of the head - this is taken to be communication between larva and adult. The nests of Cephalodesmius are also inhabited by some 8 other insect species and mites - Macrocheles tenuirostris, Hunteracarus womersleyi, Histiostoma sp., Caloglyphus sp., Sinella sp., Anotylus sp. nov., Oxytellus sp. and Leptocera myrmecophila - these are in a variety of relationships with the beetles.

- Cephalodesmius armiger
- Cephalodesmius laticollis
- Cephalodesmius quadridens
