= Ochicanthon =

Scientific classification
- Domain: Eukaryota
- Kingdom: Animalia
- Phylum: Arthropoda
- Class: Insecta
- Order: Coleoptera
- Suborder: Polyphaga
- Infraorder: Scarabaeiformia
- Family: Scarabaeidae
- Genus: Ochicanthon; Vaz-de-mello, 2003

Genus of beetles

Ochicanthon is a genus of Scarabaeidae or scarab beetles in the superfamily Scarabaeoidea.

== Species ==
- Ochicanthon besucheti Cuccodoro, 2011
- Ochicanthon cambeforti (Ochi, Kon & Kikuta, 1997)
- Ochicanthon ceylonicus Cuccodoro, 2011
- Ochicanthon cingalensis (Arrow, 1931)
- Ochicanthon crockermontis Krikken & Huijbregts, 2007
- Ochicanthon crypticus Krikken & Huijbregts, 2007
- Ochicanthon danum Krikken & Huijbregts, 2007
- Ochicanthon deplanatus (Paulian, 1983)
- Ochicanthon devagiriensis Sabu & Latha, 2011
- Ochicanthon dulitmontis Krikken & Huijbregts, 2007
- Ochicanthon dytiscoides (Boucomont, 1914)
- Ochicanthon edmondsi Krikken & Huijbregts, 2007
- Ochicanthon ernei Cuccodoro, 2011
- Ochicanthon fernandoi Sabu & Latha, 2011
- Ochicanthon gangkui (Ochi, Kon & Kikuta, 1997)
- Ochicanthon gauricola Cuccodoro, 2011
- Ochicanthon hanskii Krikken & Huijbregts, 2007
- Ochicanthon hikidai (Ochi, Kon & Kikuta, 1997)
- Ochicanthon javanus Krikken & Huijbregts, 2007
- Ochicanthon karasuyamai Ochi, Kon & Kawahara, 2007
- Ochicanthon kikutai Ochi, Ueda & Kon, 2006
- Ochicanthon kimanis Krikken & Huijbregts, 2007
- Ochicanthon laetus (Arrow, 1931)
- Ochicanthon loebli (Paulian, 1980)
- Ochicanthon maryatiae Ochi, Ueda & Kon, 2006
- Ochicanthon masumotoi (Ochi & Araya, 1996)
- Ochicanthon mulu Krikken & Huijbregts, 2007
- Ochicanthon murthyi Vinod & Sabu, 2011
- Ochicanthon mussardi Cuccodoro, 2011
- Ochicanthon neglectus Krikken & Huijbregts, 2007
- Ochicanthon niinoii Ochi & Kon, 2014
- Ochicanthon niisatoi Ochi, Kon & Masumoto, 2017
- Ochicanthon nitidus (Paulian, 1980)
- Ochicanthon obscurus (Boucomont, 1920)
- Ochicanthon ochii (Hanboonsong & Masumoto, 2001)
- Ochicanthon oharai Ochi, Kon & Hartini, 2008
- Ochicanthon okudai Ochi & Kon, 2014
- Ochicanthon parantisae (Ochi, Kon & Kikuta, 1997)
- Ochicanthon peninsularis Krikken & Huijbregts, 2007
- Ochicanthon philippinensev (Ochi, 1990)
- Ochicanthon punctatus (Boucomont, 1914)
- Ochicanthon ranongensis Ochi, Kon & Masumoto, 2020
- Ochicanthon rombauti Krikken & Huijbregts, 2007
- Ochicanthon takakui Ochi, Kon & Hartini, 2008
- Ochicanthon takuapaensis Ochi, Kon & Masumoto, 2020
- Ochicanthon tambunan Krikken & Huijbregts, 2007
- Ochicanthon thai (Paulian, 1987)
- Ochicanthon thailandicum (Masumoto, 1989)
- Ochicanthon tristis (Arrow, 1931)
- Ochicanthon tristoides (Paulian, 1983)
- Ochicanthon uedai Ochi, Kon & Hartini, 2008
- Ochicanthon vazdemelloi Ochi, Kon & Hartini, 2009
- Ochicanthon woroae Ochi, Ueda & Kon, 2006
