= Epactoides =

Scientific classification
- Domain: Eukaryota
- Kingdom: Animalia
- Phylum: Arthropoda
- Class: Insecta
- Order: Coleoptera
- Suborder: Polyphaga
- Infraorder: Scarabaeiformia
- Family: Scarabaeidae
- Subfamily: Scarabaeinae
- Tribe: Epactoidini
- Genus: Epactoides; Olsoufieff, 1947

Synonyms
- Aleiantus Olsoufieff, 1947; Madaphacosoma Paulian, 1975; Phacosomoides Martinez & Pereira, 1958; Sikorantus Paulian, 1976

Genus of beetles

Epactoides is a genus of scarab beetles in the family Scarabaeidae. There are more than 30 described species in Epactoides. They are found in Madagascar, and Epactoides giganteus is also found in La Réunion.

== Species ==
These 38 species belong to the genus Epactoides:

- Epactoides andringitrae (Paulian, 1975)
- Epactoides ankasokae (Paulian, 1975)
- Epactoides betschi (Paulian, 1975)
- Epactoides costatus (Paulian, 1992)
- Epactoides emkeni Montreuil, 2017
- Epactoides femoralis (Montreuil, 2005)
- Epactoides fiorii (Paulian, 1976)
- Epactoides frontalis (Montreuil, 2003)
- Epactoides giganteus Rossini, Vaz-de-Mello & Montreuil, 2021
- Epactoides hanskii (Montreuil, 2005)
- Epactoides helenae (Montreuil, 2005)
- Epactoides humberti (Paulian, 1975)
- Epactoides humeralis (Paulian, 1976)
- Epactoides hyphydroides Lebis, 1953
- Epactoides incertus Lebis, 1953
- Epactoides jounii Wirta & Montreuil, 2008
- Epactoides lacustris (Paulian, 1976)
- Epactoides lissus Lebis, 1953
- Epactoides madecassus (Paulian, 1935)
- Epactoides mahaboi (Paulian, 1976)
- Epactoides major (Paulian, 1991)
- Epactoides mananarae (Paulian, 1976)
- Epactoides mangabeensis Wirta & Montreuil, 2008
- Epactoides masoalae (Paulian, 1976)
- Epactoides olsoufieffi Lebis, 1953
- Epactoides paradoxus (Paulian, 1976)
- Epactoides pauliani Lebis, 1953
- Epactoides perinetanus (Paulian, 1975)
- Epactoides perrieri (Fairmaire, 1898)
- Epactoides rahagai (Montreuil, 2005)
- Epactoides sambavae (Paulian, 1976)
- Epactoides semiaeneus Lebis, 1953
- Epactoides spinicollis (Montreuil, 2003)
- Epactoides tiinae (Montreuil, 2005)
- Epactoides vadoni (Montreuil, 2005)
- Epactoides vagecarinatus Lebis, 1953
- Epactoides viridicollis (Montreuil, 2005)
- Epactoides vondrozoi (Paulian, 1976)
