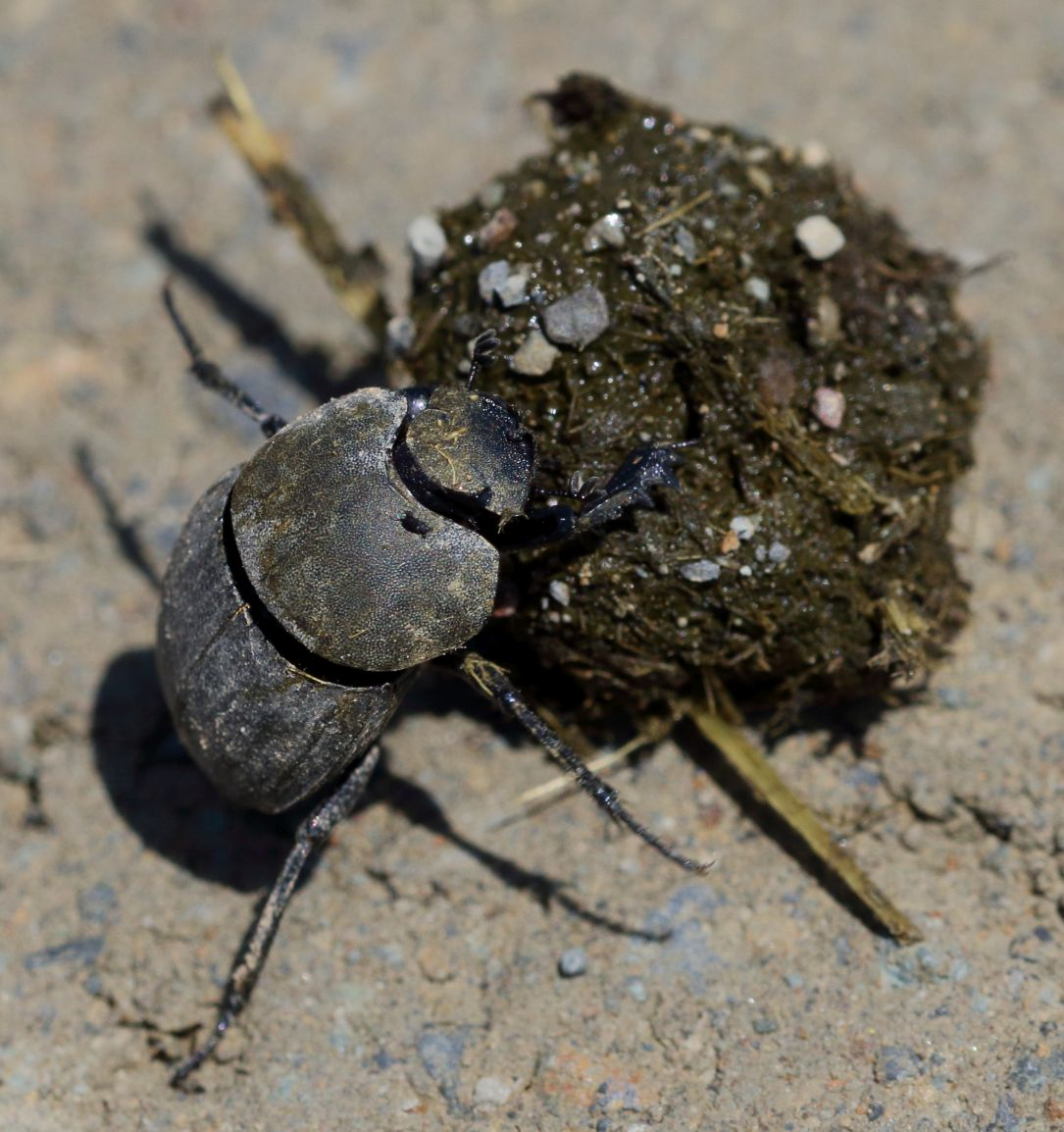
- Epirinus validus

Scientific classification
- Kingdom: Animalia
- Phylum: Arthropoda
- Class: Insecta
- Order: Coleoptera
- Suborder: Polyphaga
- Infraorder: Scarabaeiformia
- Family: Scarabaeidae
- Subfamily: Scarabaeinae
- Tribe: Deltochilini
- Genus: Epirinus; Dejean, 1833

Synonyms
- Epirhinus Agassiz, 1846

= Epirinus =

Genus of beetles

Epirinus is a genus of dung beetles in the tribe Deltochilini (subfamily Scarabaeinae) of the scarab family. It comprises 29 species from southern Africa; a few species are widespread in the region, but most have limited ranges. Length ranges from 3.0 mm to 13.5 mm.

== Ecology ==
Most species in this genus feed on herbivore dung, although some are known to eat carrion. Some of the larger species roll balls of dung, whereas smaller species have been found in leaf litter. The genus includes both flying and flightless species.

== Taxonomy ==
Species include:

- Epirinus aeneus (Wiedemann, 1823)
- Epirinus aquilus Medina & Scholtz, 2005
- Epirinus asper Peringuey, 1901
- Epirinus bentoi Ferreira, 1964
- Epirinus comosus Peringuey, 1901
- Epirinus convexus Scholtz & Howden, 1987
- Epirinus davisi Scholtz & Howden, 1987
- Epirinus drakomontanus Scholtz & Howden, 1987
- Epirinus flagellatus (Fabricius, 1775)
- Epirinus granulatus Scholtz & Howden, 1987
- Epirinus gratus Peringuey, 1901
- Epirinus hilaris Peringuey, 1901
- Epirinus hluhluwensis Medina & Scholtz, 2005
- Epirinus hopei Castelnau, 1840
- Epirinus minimus Medina & Scholtz, 2005
- Epirinus montanus Scholtz & Howden, 1987
- Epirinus mucrodentatus Scholtz & Howden, 1987
- Epirinus ngomae Medina & Scholtz, 2005
- Epirinus obtusus Boheman, 1857
- Epirinus pseudorugosus Medina & Scholtz, 2005
- Epirinus punctatus Scholtz & Howden, 1987
- Epirinus pygidialis Scholtz & Howden, 1987
- Epirinus relictus Scholtz & Howden, 1987
- Epirinus rugosus Scholtz & Howden, 1987
- Epirinus scrobiculatus Harold, 1880
- Epirinus sebastiani Medina & Scholtz, 2005
- Epirinus silvestris Cambefort, 1978
- Epirinus striatus Scholtz & Howden, 1987
- Epirinus sulcipennis Boheman, 1857
- Epirinus validus Peringuey, 1901
