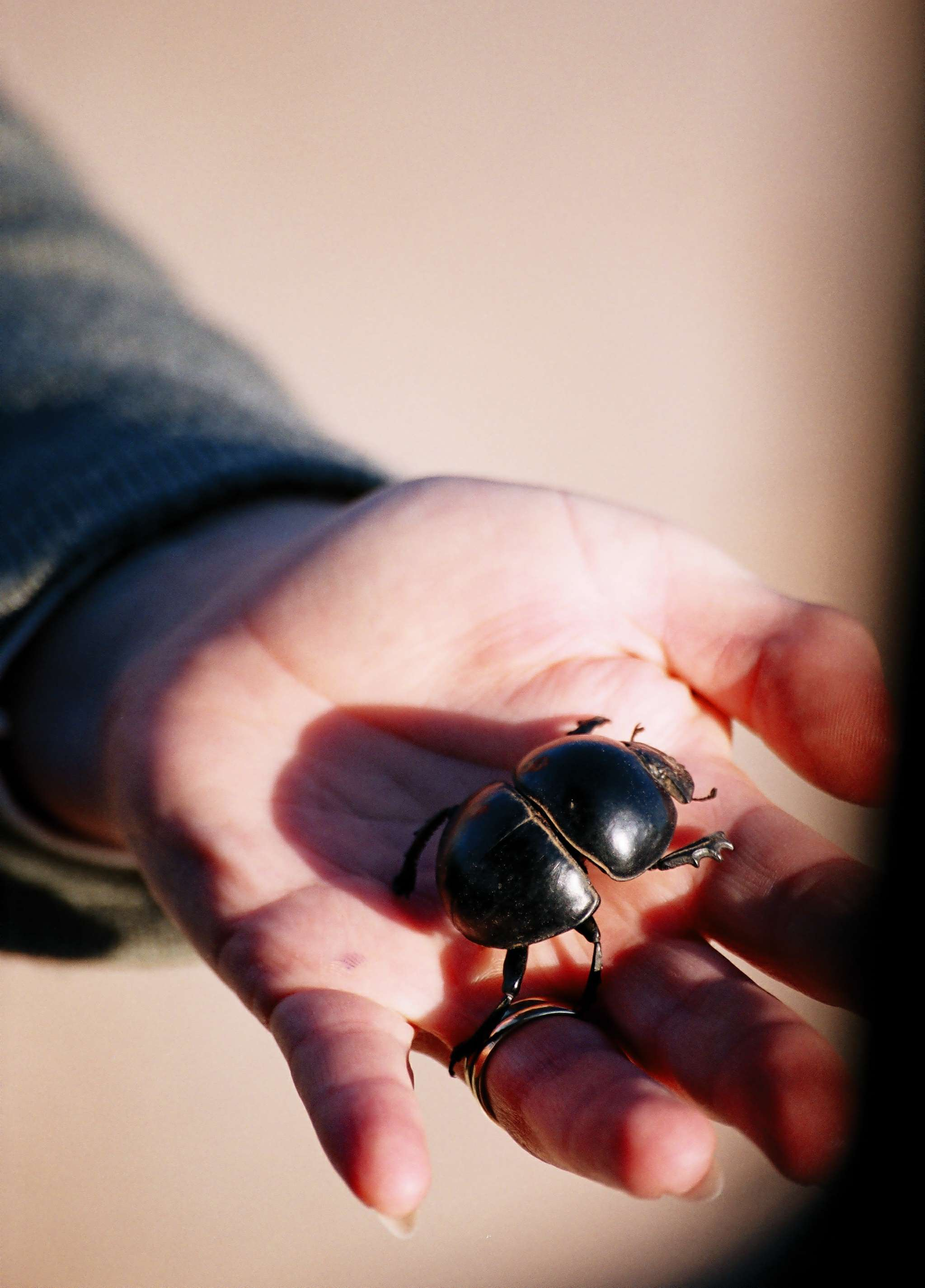

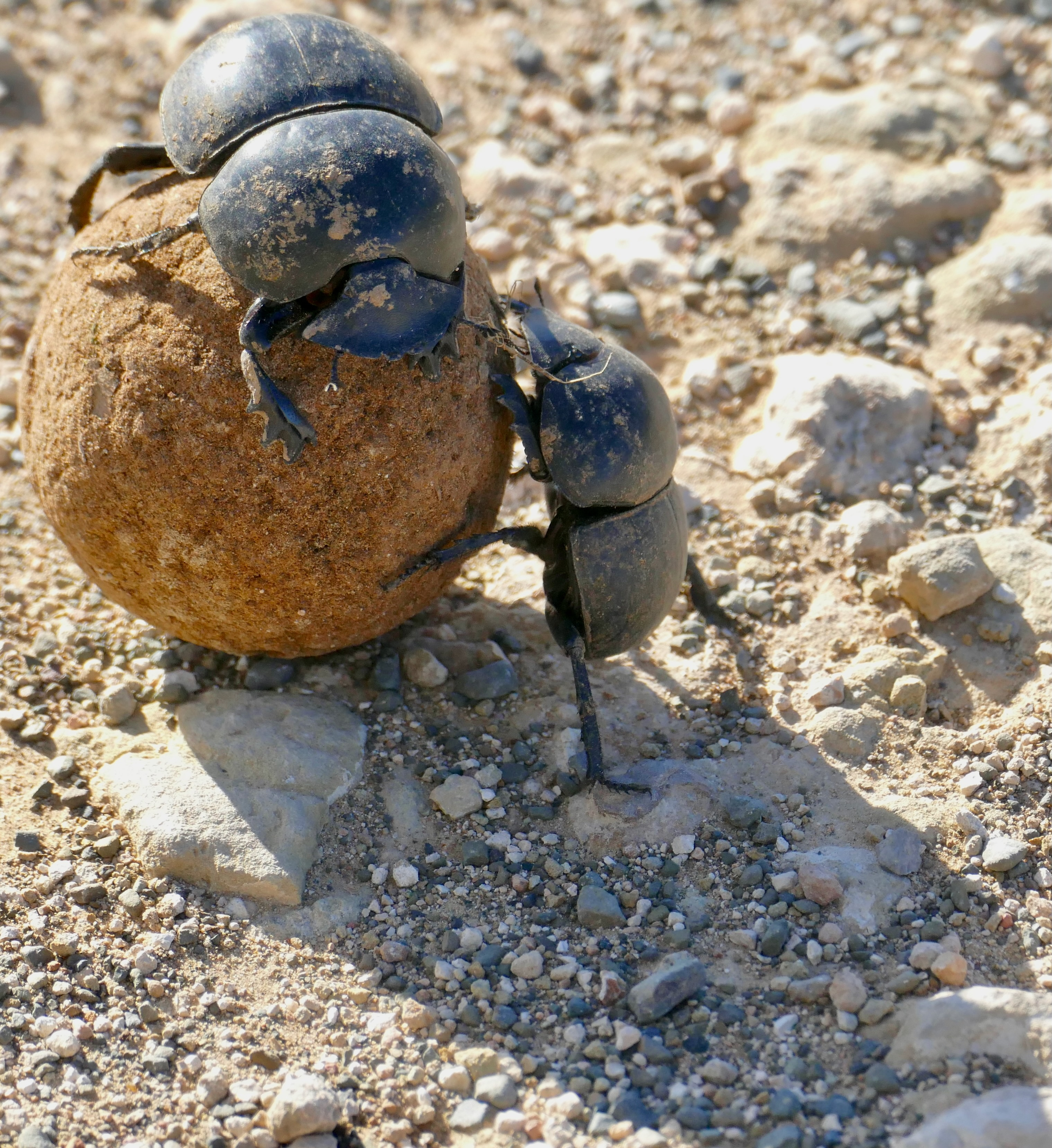
- Both from Addo Elephant National Park in Eastern Cape, South Africa

Scientific classification
- Kingdom: Animalia
- Phylum: Arthropoda
- Clade: Pancrustacea
- Class: Insecta
- Order: Coleoptera
- Suborder: Polyphaga
- Infraorder: Scarabaeiformia
- Family: Scarabaeidae
- Subfamily: Scarabaeinae
- Tribe: Deltochilini
- Genus: Circellium; Latreille, 1825
- Species: C. bacchus

Binomial name
- Circellium bacchus (Fabricius, 1781)

= Flightless dung beetle =

Genus of beetles

The flightless dung beetle (Circellium bacchus) is a species of dung beetle endemic to a few areas of South Africa, including the Addo Elephant National Park, Amakhala Game Reserve and the Buffalo Valley Game Farm. It is the only species in the genus Circellium. The loss of flight allows the beetle to use the empty space below the elytra as a carbon dioxide storage tank, creating a unique breathing mechanism which conserves water, a valuable survival trait in the arid regions it lives in.

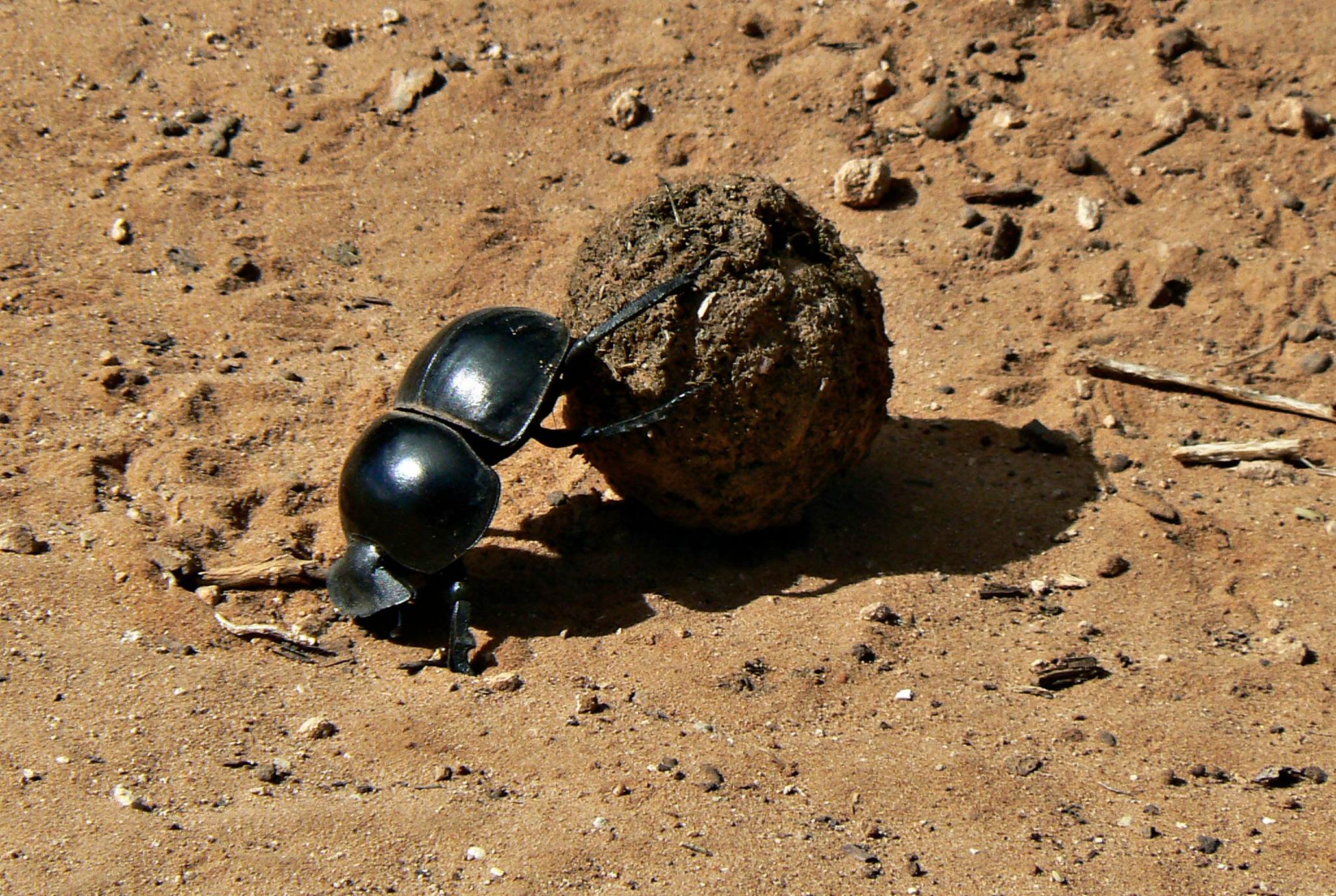
Flightless dung beetle rolling a ball of dung

The species was originally widespread in Southern Africa, but it only survives in the few areas mentioned above; as such, it qualifies as an IUCN vulnerable species. Its vulnerability is exacerbated by a number of other factors, including the fact that its habitat is under threat by agriculture and human activity, that it has low breeding capacity as well as low dispersability (as a consequence of being flightless), and that its survival is strictly dependent on a number of vertebrates (particularly elephant and buffalo) that are also experiencing a decrease in population.

C. bacchus rolling a ball of dung in the Addo Elephant National Park.

The flightless dung beetles mostly feed on elephant or buffalo faeces, but they have been recorded to also feed on dung from other species such as rabbits, baboons, antelopes, and ostriches.
