= A. naviauxi =

A. naviauxi may refer to:

- Ablaberoides naviauxi, a species of beetle
- Ammoecius naviauxi, a species of beetle
- Anthaxia naviauxi, a species of beetle in the genus Anthaxia
- Aparupa naviauxi, a species of beetle in the genus Aparupa
- Apsteiniella naviauxi, a species of beetle in the genus Apsteiniella
