= Ablabera pulicaria =

Scientific classification
- Kingdom: Animalia
- Phylum: Arthropoda
- Clade: Pancrustacea
- Class: Insecta
- Order: Coleoptera
- Suborder: Polyphaga
- Infraorder: Scarabaeiformia
- Family: Scarabaeidae
- Genus: Ablabera
- Species: A. pulicaria

Binomial name
- Ablabera pulicaria Fåhraeus, 1857

Species of beetle

Ablabera pulicaria is a species of beetle of the family Scarabaeidae. It is found in South Africa (KwaZulu-Natal).

== Taxonomy and status ==
The species was described by Fåhraeus in 1857. Péringuey listed it as a synonym of Ablabera pilosula in his Catalogue of the Coleoptera of South Africa, but stated he was sure about this placement.
