= Ablaberoides flavipennis =

Scientific classification
- Kingdom: Animalia
- Phylum: Arthropoda
- Class: Insecta
- Order: Coleoptera
- Suborder: Polyphaga
- Infraorder: Scarabaeiformia
- Superfamily: Scarabaeoidea
- Family: Scarabaeidae
- Genus: Ablaberoides
- Species: A. flavipennis

Binomial name
- Ablaberoides flavipennis (Fåhraeus, 1857)

Synonyms
- Ablabera flavipennis Fåhraeus, 1857

Species of beetle

Ablaberoides flavipennis is a species of beetle in the family Scarabaeidae. It is found in South Africa (KwaZulu-Natal, Limpopo) and Zimbabwe.

== Description ==
Adults reach a length of about 4.25-5.5 mm. They are very similar to Ablaberoides testaceus, and can be distinguished only with difficulty. The colour, however, differs in being dark bronze with the elytra testaceous-red but retaining a black suture and an outer marginal infuscate band, or being uniformly dark chestnut-brown.
