= Ablabera apicalis =

Scientific classification
- Kingdom: Animalia
- Phylum: Arthropoda
- Clade: Pancrustacea
- Class: Insecta
- Order: Coleoptera
- Suborder: Polyphaga
- Infraorder: Scarabaeiformia
- Family: Scarabaeidae
- Genus: Ablabera
- Species: A. apicalis

Binomial name
- Ablabera apicalis Fåhraeus, 1857

Species of beetle

Ablabera apicalis is a species of beetle of the family Scarabaeidae. It is found in South Africa (Orange River).

== Taxonomy and status ==
The species was described by Fåhraeus in 1857 from the Orange River in South Africa. Péringuey listed it in his Catalogue of the Coleoptera of South Africa, but stated he was not able to identify the species.
