= Ablaberoides tenellus =

Scientific classification
- Kingdom: Animalia
- Phylum: Arthropoda
- Class: Insecta
- Order: Coleoptera
- Suborder: Polyphaga
- Infraorder: Scarabaeiformia
- Family: Scarabaeidae
- Genus: Ablaberoides
- Species: A. tenellus

Binomial name
- Ablaberoides tenellus (Fåhraeus, 1857)

Synonyms
- Triodonta tenella Fåhraeus, 1857; Trochalus pallidipennis Boheman, 1857

Species of beetle

Ablaberoides tenellus is a species of beetle of the family Scarabaeidae. It is found in South Africa (KwaZulu-Natal) and Namibia.

== Description ==
They are very similar to Ablaberoides testaceus, except that the anterior tibiae are bi- instead of tri-dentate outwardly. The elytra have a more or less distinct, infuscate outer marginal band, and in some specimens the prothorax has an apical sub-triangular aeneous patch. The shape, sculpture, and striation of the elytra are exactly as in A. testaceus and the antennae are also flavous.
