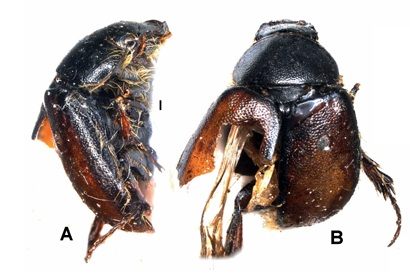

Scientific classification
- Kingdom: Animalia
- Phylum: Arthropoda
- Clade: Pancrustacea
- Class: Insecta
- Order: Coleoptera
- Suborder: Polyphaga
- Infraorder: Scarabaeiformia
- Family: Scarabaeidae
- Genus: Ablabera
- Species: A. clypeata

Binomial name
- Ablabera clypeata (Gyllenhal, 1817)

Synonyms
- Melolontha clypeata Gyllenhal, 1817

= Ablabera clypeata =

Species of beetle

Ablabera clypeata is a species of beetle of the family Scarabaeidae. It is found in South Africa.

== Taxonomy ==
Ablabera clypeata and Ablabera totta were listed by Péringuey as junior synonyms of Ablabera splendida in 1904. However, examination of both Thunberg's type specimens revealed that the types belong to different species and they are not A. splendida. Since there is no evidence in previous works that either Péringuey or other authors examined the type of any of the tree species, they are treated as valid taxa until the group is comprehensively revised.
