= Ablabera hottentota =

Scientific classification
- Kingdom: Animalia
- Phylum: Arthropoda
- Clade: Pancrustacea
- Class: Insecta
- Order: Coleoptera
- Suborder: Polyphaga
- Infraorder: Scarabaeiformia
- Family: Scarabaeidae
- Genus: Ablabera
- Species: A. hottentota

Binomial name
- Ablabera hottentota Péringuey, 1904

Species of beetle

Ablabera hottentota is a species of beetle of the family Scarabaeidae. It is found in South Africa (Western Cape).

== Description ==
Adults reach a length of about 6 mm. The shape and sculpture is similar to those of Ablabera splendida, but slightly more elongated, entirely black and fringed laterally with somewhat remote greyish setae. In some specimens, there is a faint fulvous patch in the posterior part of the elytra, and a similar spot on the pygidium.
