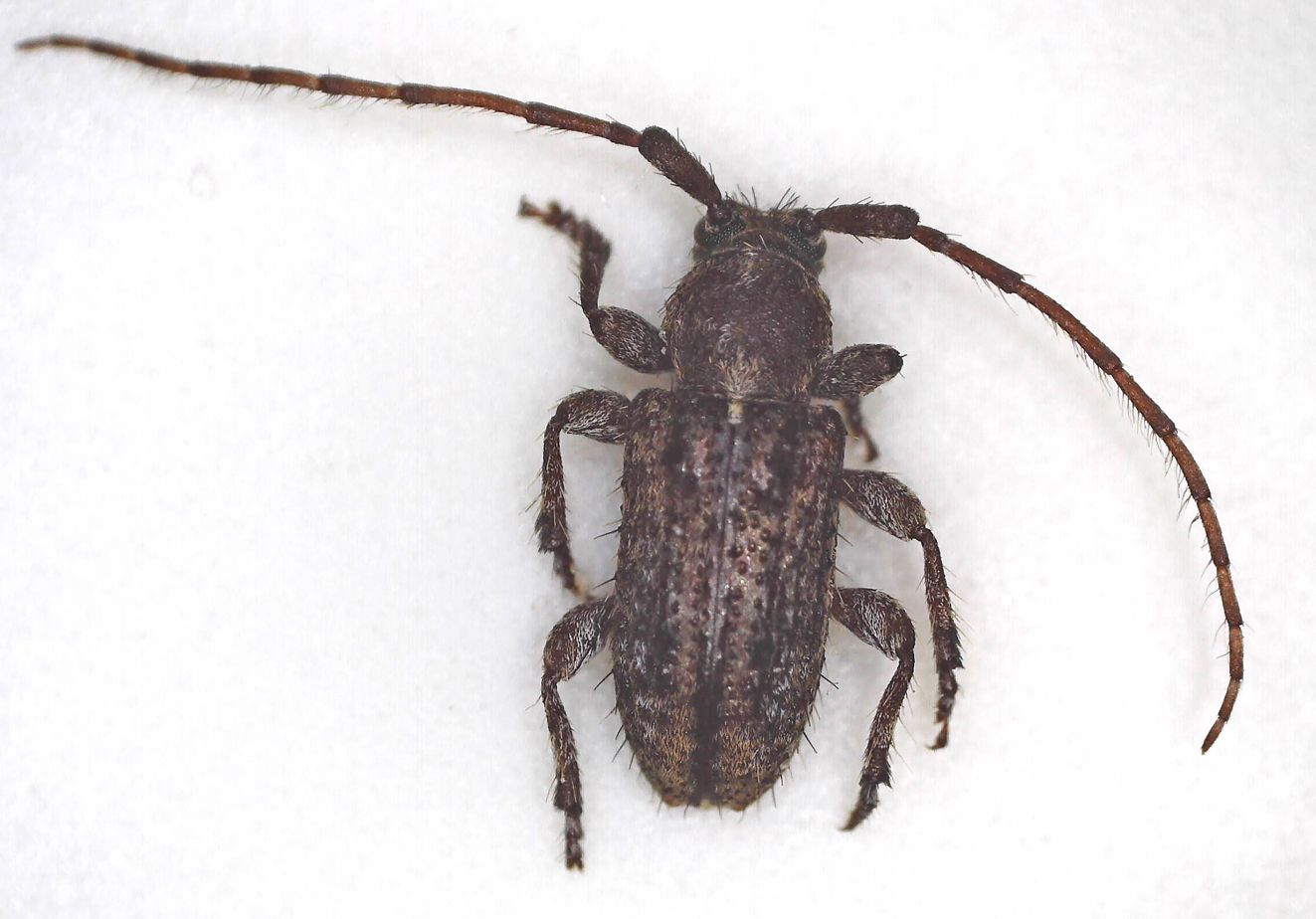

Scientific classification
- Domain: Eukaryota
- Kingdom: Animalia
- Phylum: Arthropoda
- Class: Insecta
- Order: Coleoptera
- Suborder: Polyphaga
- Infraorder: Cucujiformia
- Family: Cerambycidae
- Genus: Acartus
- Species: A. hirtus

Binomial name
- Acartus hirtus Fahroeus, 1872

= Acartus hirtus =

Species of beetle

Acartus hirtus is a species of beetle in the family Cerambycidae. It was described by Farhoeus in 1872. It is the type species for the genus Acartus.

Diet The diet of the Acartus Hirtus is mostly unknown due to very little research done with this beetle. It is speculated to be a herbivore in nature.
