= Ablabera gravidula =

Scientific classification
- Kingdom: Animalia
- Phylum: Arthropoda
- Clade: Pancrustacea
- Class: Insecta
- Order: Coleoptera
- Suborder: Polyphaga
- Infraorder: Scarabaeiformia
- Family: Scarabaeidae
- Genus: Ablabera
- Species: A. gravidula

Binomial name
- Ablabera gravidula Péringuey, 1904

Species of beetle

Ablabera gravidula is a species of beetle of the family Scarabaeidae. It is found in South Africa (Western Cape).

== Description ==
Adults reach a length of about 9 mm. They are similar to Ablabera splendida in shape, but of heavier build, and with the clypeus very slightly sinuate laterally towards the apex the outer angles of which are not sharp. The anterior margin is nearly straight. They are black, with the elytra and legs chestnut-red. The prothorax and elytra are fringed with a dense, long, fulvous pubescence. The head and prothorax are finely punctured, the punctures on the elytra are deeper and less closely set than on the prothorax.
