= Ablabera matabelena =

Scientific classification
- Kingdom: Animalia
- Phylum: Arthropoda
- Clade: Pancrustacea
- Class: Insecta
- Order: Coleoptera
- Suborder: Polyphaga
- Infraorder: Scarabaeiformia
- Family: Scarabaeidae
- Genus: Ablabera
- Species: A. matabelena

Binomial name
- Ablabera matabelena Péringuey, 1904

Species of beetle

Ablabera matabelena is a species of beetle of the family Scarabaeidae. It is found in Zimbabwe.

== Description ==
Adults reach a length of about 9 mm. They are similar to Ablabera amoena, but the colour is redder, the head is not infuscate, the clypeus is plainly sinuate laterally, the outer angles do not project in the male, and the anterior margin is only slightly sinuate.
