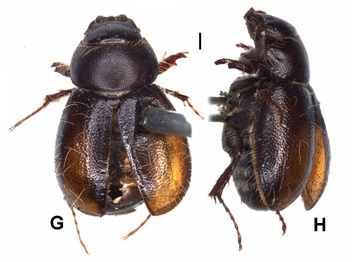

Scientific classification
- Kingdom: Animalia
- Phylum: Arthropoda
- Clade: Pancrustacea
- Class: Insecta
- Order: Coleoptera
- Suborder: Polyphaga
- Infraorder: Scarabaeiformia
- Family: Scarabaeidae
- Genus: Ablabera
- Species: A. totta

Binomial name
- Ablabera totta (Thunberg, 1818)

Synonyms
- Melolontha totta Thunberg, 1818

= Ablabera totta =

Species of beetle

Ablabera totta is a species of beetle of the family Scarabaeidae. It is found in South Africa (Western Cape).

== Taxonomy ==
Ablabera clypeata and Ablabera totta were listed by Péringuey as junior synonyms of Ablabera splendida in 1904. However, examination of both Thunberg's type specimens revealed that the types belong to different species and they are not A. splendida. Since there is no evidence in previous works that either Péringuey or other authors examined the type of any of the tree species, they are treated as valid taxa until the group is comprehensively revised.
