= Doleroserica gentilis =

Scientific classification
- Kingdom: Animalia
- Phylum: Arthropoda
- Class: Insecta
- Order: Coleoptera
- Suborder: Polyphaga
- Infraorder: Scarabaeiformia
- Family: Scarabaeidae
- Genus: Doleroserica
- Species: D. gentilis

Binomial name
- Doleroserica gentilis Péringuey, 1904

Species of beetle

Doleroserica gentilis is a species of beetle of the family Scarabaeidae. It is found in South Africa (KwaZulu-Natal).

== Description ==
Adults reach a length of about 5 mm. They are very similar to Doleroserica curtula, from which it differs by the more deeply notched anterior margin of the clypeus and the non-opaque upper part of the body which is bronze, moderately shining and faintly iridescent in the posterior part of the elytra, the latter part is striate in the dorsal part only, and not as ampliated behind as in D. curtula.
