= Ablaberoides tardus =

Scientific classification
- Kingdom: Animalia
- Phylum: Arthropoda
- Class: Insecta
- Order: Coleoptera
- Suborder: Polyphaga
- Infraorder: Scarabaeiformia
- Family: Scarabaeidae
- Genus: Ablaberoides
- Species: A. tardus

Binomial name
- Ablaberoides tardus Péringuey, 1904

Species of beetle

Ablaberoides tardus is a species of beetle in the family Scarabaeidae. It was described by Louis Albert Péringuey in 1904. It is found in Namibia.

== Description ==
Adults reach a length of about 5 mm. They are testaceous-red, with a bright sub-metallic (not iridescent) sheen. The antennee are flavescent. They are as spherical as Ablaberoides emeritus.
