= Ablaberoides rufovittatus =

Scientific classification
- Kingdom: Animalia
- Phylum: Arthropoda
- Class: Insecta
- Order: Coleoptera
- Suborder: Polyphaga
- Infraorder: Scarabaeiformia
- Family: Scarabaeidae
- Genus: Ablaberoides
- Species: A. rufovittatus

Binomial name
- Ablaberoides rufovittatus (Péringuey, 1892)

Synonyms
- Trochalus rufovittatus Péringuey, 1892

Species of beetle

Ablaberoides rufovittatus is a species of beetle of the family Scarabaeidae. It is found in Namibia.

== Description ==
Adults reach a length of about 5-5.5 mm. They are very similar to Ablaberoides crassus, but smaller and the colouration of the elytra seems to be constant. They are dark bronze with rufo-testaceous broad band extending over half the width of the elytra, and beginning at about the third dorsal stria. In spite of its great likeness to A. crassus, the difference in the shape of the genital armature is very great.
