= Ablaberoides loangoana =

Scientific classification
- Kingdom: Animalia
- Phylum: Arthropoda
- Class: Insecta
- Order: Coleoptera
- Suborder: Polyphaga
- Infraorder: Scarabaeiformia
- Family: Scarabaeidae
- Genus: Ablaberoides
- Species: A. loangoana

Binomial name
- Ablaberoides loangoana (Brenske, 1902)

Synonyms
- Holoschiza loangoana Brenske, 1902

Species of beetle

Ablaberoides loangoana is a species of beetle of the family Scarabaeidae. It is found in the Democratic Republic of the Congo.

== Description ==
Adults reach a length of about 5 mm. They have a yellowish-red, very shiny body, with the head and thorax a little redder.
