= Ablabera namaqua =

Scientific classification
- Kingdom: Animalia
- Phylum: Arthropoda
- Clade: Pancrustacea
- Class: Insecta
- Order: Coleoptera
- Suborder: Polyphaga
- Infraorder: Scarabaeiformia
- Family: Scarabaeidae
- Genus: Ablabera
- Species: A. namaqua

Binomial name
- Ablabera namaqua Péringuey, 1904

Synonyms
- Ablabera fuscipennis Blanchard, 1850; Ablabera infuscata Blanchard, 1850

Species of beetle

Ablabera namaqua is a species of beetle of the family Scarabaeidae. It is found in South Africa (Northern Cape).

== Description ==
Adults reach a length of about 8–9 mm. The head, prothorax, and under side are black, while the scutellum is fuscous. The elytra are light or dark chestnut, and the pedicel of antennae is flavous, while the upper part of the club is infuscate in both sexes. The prothorax is covered with round, equi-distant, somewhat deep and not very closely set punctures. The elytra are deeply punctate, the punctures equi-distant as on the prothorax and nearly the same size.
