= Ablabera delicatula =

Scientific classification
- Kingdom: Animalia
- Phylum: Arthropoda
- Clade: Pancrustacea
- Class: Insecta
- Order: Coleoptera
- Suborder: Polyphaga
- Infraorder: Scarabaeiformia
- Family: Scarabaeidae
- Genus: Ablabera
- Species: A. delicatula

Binomial name
- Ablabera delicatula Péringuey, 1908

Species of beetle

Ablabera delicatula is a species of beetle of the family Scarabaeidae. It is found in South Africa (Eastern Cape).

== Description ==
Adults reach a length of about 5.5–6 mm (0.22–0.24 in). They are pale straw-colored, and covered on the whole upper side with a pallid erect, dense pubescence. The pubescence on the underside and on the legs is also dense, but it is appressed. The clypeus is transverse at the apex, very slightly denticulate in the centre and with the angles sharp, projecting a little and somewhat reflexed. The surface is finely aciculate, and the clypeal suture is very slender. The head is closely and somewhat coarsely punctate. The antennae are stramineous. The prothorax is slightly wider than long, slightly ampliate rounded laterally past the median part, and covered like the head with deep, closely set punctures. The scutellum is closely punctulate and the elytra are parallel, not broader in the posterior part than the prothorax. The propygidium is aciculate, and the pygidium is sub-remotely punctate, with the punctures setigerous. The tarsi are very long and the claws slender and widely divaricating.
