= Doleroserica curtula =

Scientific classification
- Kingdom: Animalia
- Phylum: Arthropoda
- Class: Insecta
- Order: Coleoptera
- Suborder: Polyphaga
- Infraorder: Scarabaeiformia
- Family: Scarabaeidae
- Genus: Doleroserica
- Species: D. curtula

Binomial name
- Doleroserica curtula (Fåhraeus, 1858)

Synonyms
- Serica curtula Fåhraeus, 1858

Species of beetle

Doleroserica curtula is a species of beetle of the family Scarabaeidae. It is found in South Africa (KwaZulu-Natal).

== Description ==
Adults reach a length of about 4–5 mm. They are bronze-black, opaque on the upper side, sericeous and with a strong iridescent sheen. The antennae are piceous-red.
