= Ablabera rufipes =

Scientific classification
- Kingdom: Animalia
- Phylum: Arthropoda
- Clade: Pancrustacea
- Class: Insecta
- Order: Coleoptera
- Suborder: Polyphaga
- Infraorder: Scarabaeiformia
- Family: Scarabaeidae
- Genus: Ablabera
- Species: A. rufipes

Binomial name
- Ablabera rufipes Blanchard, 1850

Species of beetle

Ablabera rufipes is a species of beetle of the family Scarabaeidae. It is found in South Africa (Western Cape).

== Description ==
Adults reach a length of about 8 mm. They have a narrow, black body, clothed with ashy-grey hairs underneath. The head is punctate and the antennae and palpi are testaceous, while the club is fuscous. The prothorax is closely punctate, with the sides ciliate. The elytra are black and roughly punctate. The legs are testaceous and the abdomen is black and slightly pilose.
