= Ablaberoides kapiriensis =

Scientific classification
- Kingdom: Animalia
- Phylum: Arthropoda
- Clade: Pancrustacea
- Class: Insecta
- Order: Coleoptera
- Suborder: Polyphaga
- Infraorder: Scarabaeiformia
- Family: Scarabaeidae
- Genus: Ablaberoides
- Species: A. kapiriensis

Binomial name
- Ablaberoides kapiriensis Moser, 1916

Species of beetle

Ablaberoides kapiriensis is a species of beetle of the family Scarabaeidae. It is found in the Democratic Republic of the Congo.

== Description ==
Adults reach a length of about 6 mm. They are blackish-brown and shiny. The frons is densely punctate and the antennae are reddish-brown. The pronotum is rather densely punctate and the elytra have rows of punctures, with the intervals shallow and rather sparsely covered with punctures.
