= Ablaberoides breviusculus =

Scientific classification
- Kingdom: Animalia
- Phylum: Arthropoda
- Class: Insecta
- Order: Coleoptera
- Suborder: Polyphaga
- Infraorder: Scarabaeiformia
- Family: Scarabaeidae
- Genus: Ablaberoides
- Species: A. breviusculus

Binomial name
- Ablaberoides breviusculus (Fåhraeus, 1857)

Synonyms
- Trochalus breviusculus Fåhraeus, 1857

Species of beetle

Ablaberoides breviusculus is a species of beetle of the family Scarabaeidae. It is found in Mozambique, South Africa (Limpopo, KwaZulu-Natal) and Zimbabwe.

== Description ==
Adults reach a length of about 5-5.5 mm. They have a very short, somewhat massive body. They are very dark bronze, iridescent, with the legs piceous and the antennae dark fuscous with the exception of the intermediate joints of the pedicel which are rufescent.
