= Ammoecius incultus =

Scientific classification
- Kingdom: Animalia
- Phylum: Arthropoda
- Clade: Pancrustacea
- Class: Insecta
- Order: Coleoptera
- Suborder: Polyphaga
- Infraorder: Scarabaeiformia
- Family: Scarabaeidae
- Genus: Ammoecius
- Species: A. incultus

Binomial name
- Ammoecius incultus (Petrovitz, 1961)

Synonyms
- Aphodius (Ammoecius) incultus Petrovitz, 1961

Species of beetle

Ammoecius incultus is a species of beetle of the family Scarabaeidae. It is found in South Africa (Western Cape).

== Description ==
Adults reach a length of about 3–3.5 mm (0.12–0.14 in). They have an oblong-oval, convex, shiny, glabrous, piceous-blackish body, with the margin of the clypeus and sometimes the anterior margin of the pronotum and elytra brown-reddish. The legs are brown-reddish and the antennal club is dark testaceous.
