= Ablaberoides crassus =

Scientific classification
- Kingdom: Animalia
- Phylum: Arthropoda
- Class: Insecta
- Order: Coleoptera
- Suborder: Polyphaga
- Infraorder: Scarabaeiformia
- Family: Scarabaeidae
- Genus: Ablaberoides
- Species: A. crassus

Binomial name
- Ablaberoides crassus (Fåhraeus, 1857)

Synonyms
- Trochalus moerens Péringuey, 1892; Trochalus moestus Péringuey, 1892; Trochalus plagiatus Péringuey, 1892; Trochalus plagiatus var. vagans Péringuey, 1892

Species of beetle

Ablaberoides crassus is a species of beetles first discovered by Olof Immanuel von Fåhraeus in 1857. It is found in Namibia, South Africa, Zambia and Zimbabwe.

== Description ==
Adults reach a length of about 6-7.25 mm. They are very dark bronze with a moderate sheen or with the elytra bronze-red and a bright sheen, completely reddish on the upper side, or lastly with a fuscous, longitudinal patch on each elytron. The pedicel of the antennae is rufescent and the club is black or darkly infuscate.
