= Acartus abyssinicus =

Scientific classification
- Kingdom: Animalia
- Phylum: Arthropoda
- Class: Insecta
- Order: Coleoptera
- Suborder: Polyphaga
- Infraorder: Cucujiformia
- Family: Cerambycidae
- Genus: Acartus
- Species: A. abyssinicus

Binomial name
- Acartus abyssinicus Breuning, 1955

Species of beetle

Acartus abyssinicus is a species of beetle in the family Cerambycidae. It was described by Stephan von Breuning in 1955.
