= Ammoecius felscheanus =

Scientific classification
- Kingdom: Animalia
- Phylum: Arthropoda
- Clade: Pancrustacea
- Class: Insecta
- Order: Coleoptera
- Suborder: Polyphaga
- Infraorder: Scarabaeiformia
- Family: Scarabaeidae
- Genus: Ammoecius
- Species: A. felscheanus

Binomial name
- Ammoecius felscheanus Reitter, 1904

Species of beetle

Ammoecius felscheanus is a species of beetle of the family Scarabaeidae. It is found in Algeria.

== Description ==
Adults reach a length of about 3.5–4 mm (0.14–0.16 in). They have a strongly convex, glossy, black body, with the elytra blackish-brown and the anterior margin of the clypeus light reddish-brown.
