= Doleroserica carbonaria =

Scientific classification
- Kingdom: Animalia
- Phylum: Arthropoda
- Class: Insecta
- Order: Coleoptera
- Suborder: Polyphaga
- Infraorder: Scarabaeiformia
- Family: Scarabaeidae
- Genus: Doleroserica
- Species: D. carbonaria

Binomial name
- Doleroserica carbonaria (Burmeister, 1855)

Synonyms
- Serica carbonaria Burmeister, 1855

Species of beetle

Doleroserica carbonaria is a species of beetle of the family Scarabaeidae. It is found in South Africa.

== Description ==
They are very deep black, with an iridescent sheen. The elytra are completely opaque and striate, with the clypeus shining. The antennae and legs are shiny black.
