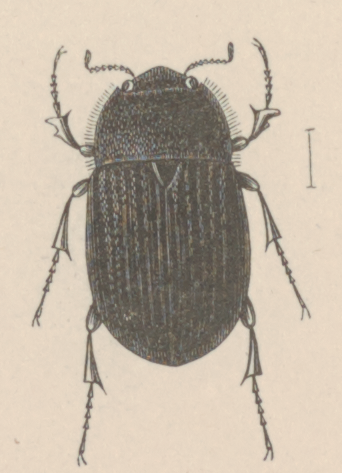

Scientific classification
- Kingdom: Animalia
- Phylum: Arthropoda
- Class: Insecta
- Order: Coleoptera
- Suborder: Polyphaga
- Infraorder: Scarabaeiformia
- Family: Scarabaeidae
- Genus: Ablaberoides
- Species: A. aeneus

Binomial name
- Ablaberoides aeneus Blanchard, 1850

Synonyms
- Trochalus longicornis Burmeister, 1855

= Ablaberoides aeneus =

Species of beetle

Ablaberoides aeneus is a species of beetle of the family Scarabaeidae. It is found in South Africa (Western Cape).

== Description ==
Adults reach a length of about 4.25–5 mm. They have a dark bronze, oblong-oval, convex body, which is lighter on the head and prothorax than on the elytra. The palpi and tarsi are somewhat rufescent and the antennae are piceous, with the four ultimate joints of the pedicel sub-rufescent.
