= Ammoecius franzi =

Scientific classification
- Kingdom: Animalia
- Phylum: Arthropoda
- Clade: Pancrustacea
- Class: Insecta
- Order: Coleoptera
- Suborder: Polyphaga
- Infraorder: Scarabaeiformia
- Family: Scarabaeidae
- Genus: Ammoecius
- Species: A. franzi

Binomial name
- Ammoecius franzi (Petrovitz, 1964)

Synonyms
- Aphodius (Ammoecius) franzi Petrovitz, 1964

Species of beetle

Ammoecius franzi is a species of beetle of the family Scarabaeidae. It is found in Morocco.

== Description ==
Adults reach a length of about 5–6 mm (0.20–0.24 in). They have an oblong, strongly convex, shiny, glabrous, black body, with the margin of the clypeus and the legs brownish and the antennal club dark testaceous.
