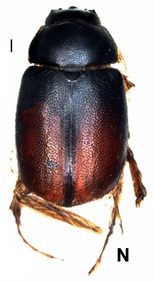

Scientific classification
- Kingdom: Animalia
- Phylum: Arthropoda
- Clade: Pancrustacea
- Class: Insecta
- Order: Coleoptera
- Suborder: Polyphaga
- Infraorder: Scarabaeiformia
- Family: Scarabaeidae
- Genus: Ablabera
- Species: A. haemorrhoa

Binomial name
- Ablabera haemorrhoa (Thunberg, 1818)

Synonyms
- Melolontha haemorrhoa Thunberg, 1818

= Ablabera haemorrhoa =

Species of beetle

Ablabera haemorrhoa is a species of beetle of the family Scarabaeidae. It is found in South Africa.
