= Ablaberoides obtusus =

Scientific classification
- Kingdom: Animalia
- Phylum: Arthropoda
- Class: Insecta
- Order: Coleoptera
- Suborder: Polyphaga
- Infraorder: Scarabaeiformia
- Family: Scarabaeidae
- Genus: Ablaberoides
- Species: A. obtusus

Binomial name
- Ablaberoides obtusus Fåhraeus, 1857

Species of beetle

Ablaberoides obtusus is a species of beetle of the family Scarabaeidae. It is found in South Africa and Zimbabwe.

== Description ==
Adults reach a length of about 6.5–7 mm. They are black, sub-opaque, with a metallic sheen, or with the elytra chestnut-red with the suture and a broad marginal outer band deeply infuscate. In the totally black specimens, the elytra are slightly iridescent. The basal joint of the pedicel and club of the antennae are black, while the other joints are rufescent.
