= Ablaberoides ominosus =

Scientific classification
- Kingdom: Animalia
- Phylum: Arthropoda
- Class: Insecta
- Order: Coleoptera
- Suborder: Polyphaga
- Infraorder: Scarabaeiformia
- Family: Scarabaeidae
- Genus: Ablaberoides
- Species: A. ominosus

Binomial name
- Ablaberoides ominosus Péringuey, 1904

Species of beetle

Ablaberoides ominosus is a species of beetle of the family Scarabaeidae. It is found in South Africa (Western Cape, KwaZulu-Natal).

== Description ==
Adults reach a length of about 5-5.75 mm. They have a short, convex body. They are black with a metallic tinge, or dark bronze, occasionally faintly iridescent. The elytra and legs are testaceous-red or dark chestnut, with a broad fuscous outer marginal band. The antennae are rufescent with the club fuscous.
