= Ablabera modesta =

Scientific classification
- Kingdom: Animalia
- Phylum: Arthropoda
- Clade: Pancrustacea
- Class: Insecta
- Order: Coleoptera
- Suborder: Polyphaga
- Infraorder: Scarabaeiformia
- Family: Scarabaeidae
- Genus: Ablabera
- Species: A. modesta

Binomial name
- Ablabera modesta Péringuey, 1904

Species of beetle

Ablabera modesta is a species of beetle of the family Scarabaeidae. It is found in South Africa (Western Cape).

== Description ==
Adults reach a length of about 7 mm. They are chestnut-brown, with the head fuscous, the pedicel of the antennae flavous and the antennal club black. The prothorax is glabrous on the upper side, fringed with long, remote hairs laterally. The elytra are glabrous and somewhat deeply punctate.
