= Ammoecius meurguesae =

Scientific classification
- Kingdom: Animalia
- Phylum: Arthropoda
- Clade: Pancrustacea
- Class: Insecta
- Order: Coleoptera
- Suborder: Polyphaga
- Infraorder: Scarabaeiformia
- Family: Scarabaeidae
- Genus: Ammoecius
- Species: A. meurguesae

Binomial name
- Ammoecius meurguesae Clément, 1975

Synonyms
- Aphodius (Ammoecius) hyrcanius Petrovitz, 1980

Species of beetle

Ammoecius meurguesae is a species of beetle of the family Scarabaeidae. It is found in Azerbaijan and Iran.

== Description ==
Adults reach a length of about 5.5–6.5 mm (0.22–0.26 in). They have an oblong, strongly convex, shiny, glabrous, black body. The margin of the clypeus is brown-reddish, the legs are brownish with paler tarsi and the antennal club is testaceous.
