= Ablaberoides loangwanus =

Scientific classification
- Kingdom: Animalia
- Phylum: Arthropoda
- Clade: Pancrustacea
- Class: Insecta
- Order: Coleoptera
- Suborder: Polyphaga
- Infraorder: Scarabaeiformia
- Family: Scarabaeidae
- Genus: Ablaberoides
- Species: A. loangwanus

Binomial name
- Ablaberoides loangwanus Moser, 1918

Species of beetle

Ablaberoides loangwanus is a species of beetle of the family Scarabaeidae. It is found in Zimbabwe.

== Description ==
Adults reach a length of about 7 mm. They are black, with a silky sheen above and a shiny underside. The head is punctate and the antennae are yellowish-red. The pronotum is densely punctate and the elytra have rows of punctures, with the intervals moderately densely punctured.
