= Ammoecius amplicollis =

Scientific classification
- Kingdom: Animalia
- Phylum: Arthropoda
- Clade: Pancrustacea
- Class: Insecta
- Order: Coleoptera
- Suborder: Polyphaga
- Infraorder: Scarabaeiformia
- Family: Scarabaeidae
- Genus: Ammoecius
- Species: A. amplicollis

Binomial name
- Ammoecius amplicollis (Peyerimhoff, 1949)

Synonyms
- Aphodius (Ammoecius) amplicollis Peyerimhoff, 1949

Species of beetle

Ammoecius amplicollis is a species of beetle of the family Scarabaeidae. It is found in Morocco.

== Description ==
Adults reach a length of about 4.5–5.5 mm (0.18–0.22 in). They have a short, oblong, convex, shiny, glabrous, black body, with the margin of the clypeus and the legs brown-reddish, and the antennal club piceous.

== Life history ==
Specimens have been collected from goat dung.
