= Acartus subinermis =

Scientific classification
- Kingdom: Animalia
- Phylum: Arthropoda
- Class: Insecta
- Order: Coleoptera
- Suborder: Polyphaga
- Infraorder: Cucujiformia
- Family: Cerambycidae
- Genus: Acartus
- Species: A. subinermis

Binomial name
- Acartus subinermis Lepesme & Breuning, 1957

Species of beetle

Acartus subinermis is a species of beetle in the family Cerambycidae. It was described by Lepesme and Breuning in 1957.
