= Ablaberoides ditissimus =

Scientific classification
- Kingdom: Animalia
- Phylum: Arthropoda
- Class: Insecta
- Order: Coleoptera
- Suborder: Polyphaga
- Infraorder: Scarabaeiformia
- Family: Scarabaeidae
- Genus: Ablaberoides
- Species: A. ditissimus

Binomial name
- Ablaberoides ditissimus Péringuey, 1904

Species of beetle

Ablaberoides ditissimus is a species of beetle of the family Scarabaeidae. It is found in South Africa (Mpumalanga, Gauteng, KwaZulu-Natal, Free State) and Zimbabwe.

== Description ==
Adults reach a length of about 7-7.25 mm. They have a short, massive, convex body, but with the elytra not very much rounded laterally behind. They are bronze-black, with the elytra somewhat redder and with a strong opaline sheen. The head and prothorax are somewhat opaque. The antennae have the club slightly infuscate and the terminal joints of the pedicel are pale flavous.
