= Ablabera hirticollis =

Scientific classification
- Kingdom: Animalia
- Phylum: Arthropoda
- Clade: Pancrustacea
- Class: Insecta
- Order: Coleoptera
- Suborder: Polyphaga
- Infraorder: Scarabaeiformia
- Family: Scarabaeidae
- Genus: Ablabera
- Species: A. hirticollis

Binomial name
- Ablabera hirticollis Péringuey, 1904

Species of beetle

Ablabera hirticollis is a species of beetle of the family Scarabaeidae. It is found in South Africa (Western Cape).

== Description ==
Adults reach a length of about 6.5-9.5 mm. The head and anterior part of the prothorax are black, while the posterior part of the prothorax is reddish. The elytra are very pale testaceous with a more or less broad fuscous lateral band. The pygidium and under side are fuscous, and the legs partly piceous.
