= Ablabera flavoclypeata =

Scientific classification
- Kingdom: Animalia
- Phylum: Arthropoda
- Clade: Pancrustacea
- Class: Insecta
- Order: Coleoptera
- Suborder: Polyphaga
- Infraorder: Scarabaeiformia
- Family: Scarabaeidae
- Genus: Ablabera
- Species: A. flavoclypeata

Binomial name
- Ablabera flavoclypeata Wallengren, 1881

Species of beetle

Ablabera flavoclypeata is a species of beetle of the family Scarabaeidae. It is found in South Africa (Transvaal).

== Taxonomy and status ==
The species was described by Wallengren in 1881. It was notably omitted from the Catalogue of the Coleoptera of South Africa by Péringuey.
