= Ablabera nana =

Scientific classification
- Kingdom: Animalia
- Phylum: Arthropoda
- Clade: Pancrustacea
- Class: Insecta
- Order: Coleoptera
- Suborder: Polyphaga
- Infraorder: Scarabaeiformia
- Family: Scarabaeidae
- Genus: Ablabera
- Species: A. nana

Binomial name
- Ablabera nana (Gyllenhal, 1817)

Synonyms
- Melolontha nana Gyllenhal, 1817

Species of beetle

Ablabera nana is a species of beetle of the family Scarabaeidae. It is found in South Africa (Western Cape).

== Taxonomy and status ==
The species was described by Harold in 1869. Péringuey listed it in his Catalogue of the Coleoptera of South Africa, but stated he was not able to identify the species.
