= Ammoecius terminatus =

Scientific classification
- Kingdom: Animalia
- Phylum: Arthropoda
- Clade: Pancrustacea
- Class: Insecta
- Order: Coleoptera
- Suborder: Polyphaga
- Infraorder: Scarabaeiformia
- Family: Scarabaeidae
- Genus: Ammoecius
- Species: A. terminatus

Binomial name
- Ammoecius terminatus Harold, 1869

Synonyms
- Aphodius (Ammoecius) orycis Endrödi, 1980; Aphodius (Ammoecius) orycoides Endrödi, 1980

Species of beetle

Ammoecius terminatus is a species of beetle of the family Scarabaeidae. It is found in Namibia and South Africa (Northern Cape, Western Cape).

== Description ==
Adults reach a length of about 3.5–5.5 mm (0.14–0.22 in). They have an oblong, convex, shiny, glabrous, piceous-black body, with the margin of the clypeus, sides of the pronotum and elytra brown-reddish, the legs dark brownish and the antennal club dark testaceous.
