= Doleroserica laetula =

Scientific classification
- Kingdom: Animalia
- Phylum: Arthropoda
- Class: Insecta
- Order: Coleoptera
- Suborder: Polyphaga
- Infraorder: Scarabaeiformia
- Family: Scarabaeidae
- Genus: Doleroserica
- Species: D. laetula

Binomial name
- Doleroserica laetula Péringuey, 1904

Species of beetle

Doleroserica laetula is a species of beetle of the family Scarabaeidae. It is found in Mozambique.

== Description ==
Adults reach a length of about 6.25 mm. They are bronze-red, quite opaque and sericeous on the upper surface, shiny and iridescent underneath. The antennae are ferruginous-red.
