= Ablaberoides maynei =

Scientific classification
- Kingdom: Animalia
- Phylum: Arthropoda
- Class: Insecta
- Order: Coleoptera
- Suborder: Polyphaga
- Infraorder: Scarabaeiformia
- Family: Scarabaeidae
- Genus: Ablaberoides
- Species: A. maynei

Binomial name
- Ablaberoides maynei Burgeon, 1943

Species of beetle

Ablaberoides maynei is a species of beetles. It is known from Tanzania.
