= Ablaberoides decedens =

Scientific classification
- Kingdom: Animalia
- Phylum: Arthropoda
- Class: Insecta
- Order: Coleoptera
- Suborder: Polyphaga
- Infraorder: Scarabaeiformia
- Family: Scarabaeidae
- Genus: Ablaberoides
- Species: A. decedens

Binomial name
- Ablaberoides decedens Péringuey, 1904

Species of beetle

Ablaberoides decedens is a species of beetle of the family Scarabaeidae. It is found in South Africa (KwaZulu-Natal).

== Description ==
Adults reach a length of about 5.5–6 mm. They have a shining, hardly iridescent, chestnut-brown, elongate-ovate body, with the elytra and legs lighter brown. The antennae are flavous.
