= Trochaloserica testaceipennis =

Scientific classification
- Kingdom: Animalia
- Phylum: Arthropoda
- Clade: Pancrustacea
- Class: Insecta
- Order: Coleoptera
- Suborder: Polyphaga
- Infraorder: Scarabaeiformia
- Family: Scarabaeidae
- Genus: Trochaloserica
- Species: T. testaceipennis

Binomial name
- Trochaloserica testaceipennis Moser, 1924

Synonyms
- Ablaberoides testaceipennis (Moser, 1924)

Species of beetle

Trochaloserica testaceipennis is a species of beetle. It was described by Julius Moser in 1924. It is known from Oldoway (Tanzania).

Trochaloserica testaceipennis measure 5 mm (0.20 in).
