= Ablabera capicola =

Scientific classification
- Kingdom: Animalia
- Phylum: Arthropoda
- Clade: Pancrustacea
- Class: Insecta
- Order: Coleoptera
- Suborder: Polyphaga
- Infraorder: Scarabaeiformia
- Family: Scarabaeidae
- Genus: Ablabera
- Species: A. capicola

Binomial name
- Ablabera capicola Péringuey, 1904

Species of beetle

Ablabera capicola is a species of beetle discovered by Louis Péringuey in 1904. It is found in South Africa (Western Cape, Eastern Cape).

== Description ==
Adults reach a length of about 7-7.5 mm. The head and prothorax are black, the elytra fuscous or faintly chestnut-brown in the posterior part and the under side is infuscate. The legs are reddish, and the club of the antennae is fuscous, while the pedicel is rufescent. The head and prothorax are glabrous, the latter, however, fringed with a dense, long fulvous pubescence. The elytra have short, greyish erect hairs arranged in regular rows, and having along the margins a dense fringe of fulvous hairs.
