= Ablaberoides haafi =

Scientific classification
- Kingdom: Animalia
- Phylum: Arthropoda
- Class: Insecta
- Order: Coleoptera
- Suborder: Polyphaga
- Infraorder: Scarabaeiformia
- Family: Scarabaeidae
- Genus: Ablaberoides
- Species: A. haafi

Binomial name
- Ablaberoides haafi Frey, 1975

Species of beetle

Ablaberoides haafi is a species of beetle of the family Scarabaeidae. It is found in South Africa (Mpumalanga).

== Description ==
Adults reach a length of about 5 mm. The upper and lower surfaces are black and shiny, with two reddish striations on each elytron. The upper surface is glabrous, while the underside has a few setae on the sides of the metasternum and in transverse rows on the ventral segments. The pronotum is very densely and uniformly finely, but deeply punctate. The elytra have faint, indistinct punctate striae on the disc.
