= Ammoecius satanas =

Scientific classification
- Kingdom: Animalia
- Phylum: Arthropoda
- Clade: Pancrustacea
- Class: Insecta
- Order: Coleoptera
- Suborder: Polyphaga
- Infraorder: Scarabaeiformia
- Family: Scarabaeidae
- Genus: Ammoecius
- Species: A. satanas

Binomial name
- Ammoecius satanas (Carpaneto, 1976)

Synonyms
- Aphodius (Ammoecius) satanas Carpaneto, 1976

Species of beetle

Ammoecius satanas is a species of beetle of the family Scarabaeidae. It is found in southern Turkey.

== Description ==
Adults reach a length of about 6.5–7.5 mm (0.26–0.30 in). They have an oblong, strongly convex, shiny, glabrous, blackish body, with the margin of the clypeus and anterior angles of the pronotum reddish, the legs brownish and the antennal club dark testaceous.
