= Ablabera gratula =

Scientific classification
- Kingdom: Animalia
- Phylum: Arthropoda
- Clade: Pancrustacea
- Class: Insecta
- Order: Coleoptera
- Suborder: Polyphaga
- Infraorder: Scarabaeiformia
- Family: Scarabaeidae
- Genus: Ablabera
- Species: A. gratula

Binomial name
- Ablabera gratula Péringuey, 1904

Species of beetle

Ablabera gratula is a species of beetle of the family Scarabaeidae. It is found in South Africa (Western Cape).

== Description ==
Adults reach a length of about 7.5–9 mm. The head and anterior part of prothorax are black, while the posterior part is red. The scutellum is black and the under side is piceous, with the legs rufescent. The elytra are pale testaceous and have an outer marginal narrow, fuscous band. The pedicel of the antennae is flavous in both sexes, while the club is infuscate.
