= Ablabera rufa =

Scientific classification
- Kingdom: Animalia
- Phylum: Arthropoda
- Clade: Pancrustacea
- Class: Insecta
- Order: Coleoptera
- Suborder: Polyphaga
- Infraorder: Scarabaeiformia
- Family: Scarabaeidae
- Genus: Ablabera
- Species: A. rufa

Binomial name
- Ablabera rufa (Fabricius, 1775)

Synonyms
- Melolontha rufa Fabricius, 1775; Melolontha rufescens Gmelin, 1790

Species of beetle

Ablabera rufa is a species of beetle of the family Scarabaeidae. It is found in South Africa (Western Cape).

== Description ==
Adults reach a length of about 7.5–9 mm. They are somewhat rufescent, but with the elytra a little paler, fringed along the sides of the prothorax and elytra with a somewhat long, dense, flavescent pubescence. The antennae are flavous. The prothorax and elytra are punctate, the latter without any traces of dorsal costules.
