= Ablaberoides lembanus =

Scientific classification
- Kingdom: Animalia
- Phylum: Arthropoda
- Clade: Pancrustacea
- Class: Insecta
- Order: Coleoptera
- Suborder: Polyphaga
- Infraorder: Scarabaeiformia
- Family: Scarabaeidae
- Genus: Ablaberoides
- Species: A. lembanus

Binomial name
- Ablaberoides lembanus Moser, 1916

Species of beetle

Ablaberoides lembanus is a species of beetle of the family Scarabaeidae. It is found in the Democratic Republic of the Congo.

== Description ==
Adults reach a length of about 7 mm. They are black, with the upper surface faintly silky-sheened and the underside shiny. The antennae are reddish-brown. The pronotum has moderately dense punctation and the lateral margins are strongly setose. The elytra have rows of punctures, with the intervals moderately densely covered with punctures.
