= Ablabera araneoides =

Scientific classification
- Kingdom: Animalia
- Phylum: Arthropoda
- Clade: Pancrustacea
- Class: Insecta
- Order: Coleoptera
- Suborder: Polyphaga
- Infraorder: Scarabaeiformia
- Family: Scarabaeidae
- Genus: Ablabera
- Species: A. araneoides

Binomial name
- Ablabera araneoides (Fabricius, 1792)

Synonyms
- Melolontha araneoides Fabricius, 1792

Species of beetle

Ablabera araneoides is a species of beetle of the family Scarabaeidae. It is found in South Africa (Cape).

== Taxonomy and status ==
The species was described by Fabricius in 1792. It was notably omitted from the Catalogue of the Coleoptera of South Africa by Péringuey.
