= Ablaberoides dentilabris =

Scientific classification
- Kingdom: Animalia
- Phylum: Arthropoda
- Class: Insecta
- Order: Coleoptera
- Suborder: Polyphaga
- Infraorder: Scarabaeiformia
- Family: Scarabaeidae
- Genus: Ablaberoides
- Species: A. dentilabris

Binomial name
- Ablaberoides dentilabris (Lansberge, 1886)

Synonyms
- Holoschiza dentilabris Lansberge, 1886

Species of beetle

Ablaberoides dentilabris is a species of beetles in the family Scarabaeidae. It was described by J. W. van Lansberge in 1886. It is found in Angola and the Democratic Republic of the Congo.

== Description ==
Adults reach a length of about 4.5 mm. They have a yellowish-red, shiny, oblong-oval body, with the head somewhat darker. The elytra have distinct punctate striae.
