= Ammoecius dentatus =

Scientific classification
- Kingdom: Animalia
- Phylum: Arthropoda
- Clade: Pancrustacea
- Class: Insecta
- Order: Coleoptera
- Suborder: Polyphaga
- Infraorder: Scarabaeiformia
- Family: Scarabaeidae
- Genus: Ammoecius
- Species: A. dentatus

Binomial name
- Ammoecius dentatus Schmidt, 1908

Species of beetle

Ammoecius dentatus is a species of beetle of the family Scarabaeidae. It is found in Morocco, Portugal and Spain.

== Description ==
Adults reach a length of about 3.5–5 mm (0.14–0.20 in). They have a rather short-oval, strongly convex, shiny, black body.

== Life history ==
They inhabit coastal sands.
