= Trochaloserica festiva =

Scientific classification
- Kingdom: Animalia
- Phylum: Arthropoda
- Class: Insecta
- Order: Coleoptera
- Suborder: Polyphaga
- Infraorder: Scarabaeiformia
- Family: Scarabaeidae
- Genus: Trochaloserica
- Species: T. festiva

Binomial name
- Trochaloserica festiva Brenske, 1902

Synonyms
- Ablaberoides festiva

Species of beetle

Trochaloserica festiva is a species of beetle of the family Scarabaeidae. It is found in Tanzania.

== Description ==
Adults reach a length of about 5 mm. They have a reddish-yellow, oblong-oval body. The pronotum is densely punctate.
