= Ablabera similata =

Scientific classification
- Kingdom: Animalia
- Phylum: Arthropoda
- Class: Insecta
- Order: Coleoptera
- Suborder: Polyphaga
- Infraorder: Scarabaeiformia
- Family: Scarabaeidae
- Genus: Ablabera
- Species: A. similata

Binomial name
- Ablabera similata Burmeister, 1855

Species of beetle

Ablabera similata is a beetle discovered by Hermann Burmeister in 1855. It is found in South Africa (KwaZulu-Natal).
