= Doleroserica festa =

Scientific classification
- Kingdom: Animalia
- Phylum: Arthropoda
- Class: Insecta
- Order: Coleoptera
- Suborder: Polyphaga
- Infraorder: Scarabaeiformia
- Family: Scarabaeidae
- Genus: Doleroserica
- Species: D. festa

Binomial name
- Doleroserica festa Péringuey, 1904

Species of beetle

Doleroserica festa is a species of beetle of the family Scarabaeidae. It is found in South Africa (Mpumalanga).

== Description ==
Adults reach a length of about 5–6 mm. They are moderately shining, bronze-green on the head and prothorax, but redder bronze on the elytra, almost black on the under side. The antennae are flavous.
