= Ablabera transvaalica =

Scientific classification
- Kingdom: Animalia
- Phylum: Arthropoda
- Clade: Pancrustacea
- Class: Insecta
- Order: Coleoptera
- Suborder: Polyphaga
- Infraorder: Scarabaeiformia
- Family: Scarabaeidae
- Genus: Ablabera
- Species: A. transvaalica

Binomial name
- Ablabera transvaalica Péringuey, 1904

Species of beetle

Ablabera transvaalica is a species of beetle of the family Scarabaeidae. It is found in South Africa (Mpumalanga).

== Description ==
Adults reach a length of about 6.5 mm. They are very light straw-colour, with the frontal part of the head (from the frontal suture to the base) fuscous, the prothorax is also fuscous black, except for a narrow, stramineous lateral margin. The scutellum is black and the elytra have a narrow sutural, and a supra-marginal slightly broader fuscous band.
