= Ablabera iridescens =

Scientific classification
- Kingdom: Animalia
- Phylum: Arthropoda
- Clade: Pancrustacea
- Class: Insecta
- Order: Coleoptera
- Suborder: Polyphaga
- Infraorder: Scarabaeiformia
- Family: Scarabaeidae
- Genus: Ablabera
- Species: A. iridescens

Binomial name
- Ablabera iridescens Fairmaire, 1886

Species of beetle

Ablabera iridescens is a species of beetle of the family Scarabaeidae. It is found in Madagascar.

== Description ==
Adults reach a length of about 5 mm (0.20 in). In terms of coloration, they resemble Hyposerica micans, which displays beautiful iridescent reflections. In iridescens however, a coppery hue is intermingled, positioned transversely beyond the midpoint of the elytra, which feature fairly pronounced ridges.
