= Ablaberoides nitidulus =

Scientific classification
- Kingdom: Animalia
- Phylum: Arthropoda
- Clade: Pancrustacea
- Class: Insecta
- Order: Coleoptera
- Suborder: Polyphaga
- Infraorder: Scarabaeiformia
- Family: Scarabaeidae
- Genus: Ablaberoides
- Species: A. nitidulus

Binomial name
- Ablaberoides nitidulus Moser, 1916

Species of beetle

Ablaberoides nitidulus is a species of beetle of the family Scarabaeidae. It is found in the Democratic Republic of the Congo.

== Description ==
Adults reach a length of about 5.5 mm. They are reddish-brown and shiny, with a slight metallic sheen. The head is punctate and the antennae are reddish-brown. The pronotum is densely punctate and the elytra has rows of punctures, with the intervals shallow and moderately densely punctured.
