= Ammoecius mimus =

Scientific classification
- Kingdom: Animalia
- Phylum: Arthropoda
- Clade: Pancrustacea
- Class: Insecta
- Order: Coleoptera
- Suborder: Polyphaga
- Infraorder: Scarabaeiformia
- Family: Scarabaeidae
- Genus: Ammoecius
- Species: A. mimus

Binomial name
- Ammoecius mimus (Péringuey, 1901)

Synonyms
- Aphodius (Ammoecius) mimus Péringuey, 1901; Aphodius (Ammoecius) dukei Endrödi, 1964; Aphodius (Ammoecius) kochi Petrovitz, 1961

Species of beetle

Ammoecius mimus is a species of beetle of the family Scarabaeidae. It is found in Namibia and South Africa (Northern Cape, Western Cape).

== Description ==
Adults reach a length of about 4–5 mm (0.16–0.20 in). They have an oblong, strongly convex, shiny, glabrous, piceous body, with the margin of the clypeus, sides of the pronotum and elytra reddish and the legs brown-reddish. The antennal club is dark testaceous.
