= Ablabera setosa =

Scientific classification
- Kingdom: Animalia
- Phylum: Arthropoda
- Clade: Pancrustacea
- Class: Insecta
- Order: Coleoptera
- Suborder: Polyphaga
- Infraorder: Scarabaeiformia
- Family: Scarabaeidae
- Genus: Ablabera
- Species: A. setosa

Binomial name
- Ablabera setosa Frey, 1960

Species of beetle

Ablabera setosa is a species of beetle of the family Scarabaeidae. It is found in Botswana.

== Description ==
Adults reach a length of about 4.5–5 mm. The head is black, while the pronotum black with a dark yellow, irregularly broad margin and yellow spots at the base. The elytra are dark yellow with a black suture. The underside and pygidium are black, and the legs brownish-black.
