= Ablabera bagamojana =

Scientific classification
- Kingdom: Animalia
- Phylum: Arthropoda
- Clade: Pancrustacea
- Class: Insecta
- Order: Coleoptera
- Suborder: Polyphaga
- Infraorder: Scarabaeiformia
- Family: Scarabaeidae
- Genus: Ablabera
- Species: A. bagamojana

Binomial name
- Ablabera bagamojana Brenske, 1897

Species of beetle

Ablabera bagamojana is a species of beetle of the family Scarabaeidae. It is found in Tanzania.

== Description ==
Adults reach a length of about 5.5 mm (0.22 in). They have an egg-shaped, glossy and smooth body. The underside is only very sparsely hairy. The head and pronotum are deep black, while the elytra are blackish-brown. The body, as well as the tarsi, is red.
