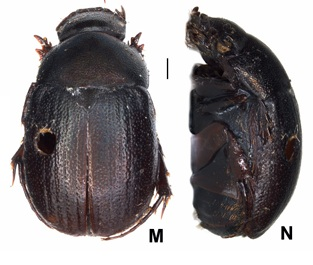

Scientific classification
- Kingdom: Animalia
- Phylum: Arthropoda
- Class: Insecta
- Order: Coleoptera
- Suborder: Polyphaga
- Infraorder: Scarabaeiformia
- Family: Scarabaeidae
- Genus: Ablaberoides
- Species: A. fuliginosus

Binomial name
- Ablaberoides fuliginosus (Thunberg, 1818)

Synonyms
- Melolontha fuliginosa Thunberg, 1818

= Ablaberoides fuliginosus =

Species of beetle

Ablaberoides fuliginosus is a species of beetle of the family Scarabaeidae. It is found in South Africa (Western Cape, Northern Cape, Eastern Cape).

== Description ==
Adults reach a length of about 5.5 mm. They have a blackish, short, oval body, with black antennae. They surface has an iridescent shine and is glabrous, except for a few robust setae on the head.
