= Trochaloserica obscurifrons =

Scientific classification
- Kingdom: Animalia
- Phylum: Arthropoda
- Class: Insecta
- Order: Coleoptera
- Suborder: Polyphaga
- Infraorder: Scarabaeiformia
- Family: Scarabaeidae
- Genus: Trochaloserica
- Species: T. obscurifrons

Binomial name
- Trochaloserica obscurifrons Moser, 1920

Synonyms
- Ablaberoides oscurifrons (Moser, 1920)

Species of beetle

Trochaloserica oscurifrons is a species of beetle. It was described by Julius Moser in 1920. It is known from Umbugwe (Tanzania).

Trochaloserica oscurifrons measure 5–6 mm (0.20–0.24 in).
