= Ablabera lutaria =

Scientific classification
- Kingdom: Animalia
- Phylum: Arthropoda
- Clade: Pancrustacea
- Class: Insecta
- Order: Coleoptera
- Suborder: Polyphaga
- Infraorder: Scarabaeiformia
- Family: Scarabaeidae
- Genus: Ablabera
- Species: A. lutaria

Binomial name
- Ablabera lutaria Harold, 1869

Synonyms
- Ablabera luridipennis Burmeister, 1855

Species of beetle

Ablabera lutaria is a species of beetle of the family Scarabaeidae. It is found in South Africa (KwaZulu-Natal).

== Taxonomy and status ==
The species was described by Harold in 1869. Péringuey listed it in his Catalogue of the Coleoptera of South Africa, but stated he was not able to identify the species.
