= Ablaberoides laetulus =

Scientific classification
- Kingdom: Animalia
- Phylum: Arthropoda
- Class: Insecta
- Order: Coleoptera
- Suborder: Polyphaga
- Infraorder: Scarabaeiformia
- Family: Scarabaeidae
- Genus: Ablaberoides
- Species: A. laetulus

Binomial name
- Ablaberoides laetulus Péringuey, 1904

Species of beetle

Ablaberoides laetulus is a species of beetle of the family Scarabaeidae. It is found in Zimbabwe.

== Description ==
Adults reach a length of about 5.5-6.5 mm. They have a bronze-black, sub-opaque (but with an iridescent sheen), ovate body. The antennae are flavescent and the legs are ferruginous.
