= Ablaberoides nigrobrunnea =

Scientific classification
- Kingdom: Animalia
- Phylum: Arthropoda
- Class: Insecta
- Order: Coleoptera
- Suborder: Polyphaga
- Infraorder: Scarabaeiformia
- Family: Scarabaeidae
- Genus: Ablaberoides
- Species: A. nigrobrunnea

Binomial name
- Ablaberoides nigrobrunnea (Brenske, 1902)

Synonyms
- Holoschiza nigrobrunnea Brenske, 1902

Species of beetle

Ablaberoides nigrobrunnea is a species of beetle of the family Scarabaeidae. It is found in the Democratic Republic of the Congo.

== Description ==
Adults reach a length of about 4 mm. They have a dark brown, compact, oval body, with a dark head and pronotum of which only the lateral and posterior margins remain brown. The scutellum, suture, and lateral margins of the elytra are black. The pronotum is more strongly punctate, but the elytra more distinct.
