= Ammoecius numidicus =

Scientific classification
- Kingdom: Animalia
- Phylum: Arthropoda
- Clade: Pancrustacea
- Class: Insecta
- Order: Coleoptera
- Suborder: Polyphaga
- Infraorder: Scarabaeiformia
- Family: Scarabaeidae
- Genus: Ammoecius
- Species: A. numidicus

Binomial name
- Ammoecius numidicus Mulsant, 1851

Species of beetle

Ammoecius numidicus is a species of beetle of the family Scarabaeidae. It is found in Algeria.

== Description ==
Adults reach a length of about 4.5–5 mm (0.18–0.20 in). They have a short, oblong, strongly convex, shiny, glabrous, black body, with the margin of the clypeus reddish, the legs dark brownish and the antennal club testaceous.
