= Doleroserica auspicata =

Scientific classification
- Kingdom: Animalia
- Phylum: Arthropoda
- Class: Insecta
- Order: Coleoptera
- Suborder: Polyphaga
- Infraorder: Scarabaeiformia
- Family: Scarabaeidae
- Genus: Doleroserica
- Species: D. auspicata

Binomial name
- Doleroserica auspicata Péringuey, 1904

Species of beetle

Doleroserica auspicata is a species of beetle of the family Scarabaeidae. It is found in South Africa (KwaZulu-Natal).

== Description ==
Adults reach a length of about 4.5 mm. They are bronze-black underneath, with the head, the prothorax (with the exception of a very broad median patch) and the scutellum bronze-green. The elytra are flavescent, the legs testaceous-red and the antennae flavous. They are moderately shiny on the upper side and slightly iridescent in the posterior part of the elytra.
