= Trochaloserica =

Scientific classification
- Kingdom: Animalia
- Phylum: Arthropoda
- Class: Insecta
- Order: Coleoptera
- Suborder: Polyphaga
- Infraorder: Scarabaeiformia
- Family: Scarabaeidae
- Tribe: Sericini
- Genus: Trochaloserica; Brenske, 1900

Genus of beetles

Trochaloserica is a genus of beetles within the family Scarabaeidae. It is known from Tanzania.

BioLib treats Trochaloserica as synonym of Ablaberoides.

== Species ==
There are four recognized species:

- Trochaloserica elongata Frey, 1968
- Trochaloserica festiva Brenske, 1902
- Trochaloserica obscurifrons Moser, 1920
- Trochaloserica testaceipennis Moser, 1924
