= Ablaberoides abyssinicus =

Scientific classification
- Kingdom: Animalia
- Phylum: Arthropoda
- Class: Insecta
- Order: Coleoptera
- Suborder: Polyphaga
- Infraorder: Scarabaeiformia
- Family: Scarabaeidae
- Genus: Ablaberoides
- Species: A. abyssinicus

Binomial name
- Ablaberoides abyssinicus (Brenske, 1902)

Synonyms
- Holoschiza abyssinica Brenske, 1902; Bielliana freyi Baraud, 1980; Bielliana maroccana Baraud, 1980; Bielliana yemenica Baraud, 1980; Ablaberoides saatiensis Frey, 1973; Ablaberoides somalicola Frey, 1969

Species of beetle

Ablaberoides abyssinicus is a species of beetle of the family Scarabaeidae. It is found in Chad, Ethiopia, Somalia, Egypt, Morocco, Oman, Saudi Arabia, the United Arab Emirates and Yemen.

== Description ==
Adults reach a length of about 4.7–6 mm. They have a dark to reddish-brown, short, oblong-oval body. The dorsal surface is glabrous.
