= Trochaloserica elongata =

Scientific classification
- Kingdom: Animalia
- Phylum: Arthropoda
- Class: Insecta
- Order: Coleoptera
- Suborder: Polyphaga
- Infraorder: Scarabaeiformia
- Family: Scarabaeidae
- Genus: Trochaloserica
- Species: T. elongata

Binomial name
- Trochaloserica elongata Frey, 1968

Synonyms
- Ablaberoides elongata

Species of beetle

Trochaloserica elongata is a species of beetle of the family Scarabaeidae. It is found in Tanzania.

== Description ==
Adults reach a length of about 6 mm. The upper and lower surfaces are dark brown and slightly shiny. The upper surface is smooth, and there are a few cilia on the anterior margin of the elytra, as well as a few erect setae at the apex of the pygidium. The underside is also smooth. The pronotum is moderately densely and coarsely punctate and the elytra have striae of punctures.
