= Ammoecius lugubris =

Scientific classification
- Kingdom: Animalia
- Phylum: Arthropoda
- Clade: Pancrustacea
- Class: Insecta
- Order: Coleoptera
- Suborder: Polyphaga
- Infraorder: Scarabaeiformia
- Family: Scarabaeidae
- Genus: Ammoecius
- Species: A. lugubris

Binomial name
- Ammoecius lugubris Boheman, 1857

Synonyms
- Aphodius (Ammoecius) dentinus Péringuey, 1901; Ammoecius bidentulus Harold, 1871; Aphodius viduus Dejean, 1833

Species of beetle

Ammoecius lugubris is a species of beetle of the family Scarabaeidae. It is found in South Africa (Western Cape, southern Cape).

== Description ==
Adults reach a length of about 3.5–5 mm (0.14–0.20 in). They have an oblong-oval, convex, shiny, glabrous, piceous body, with the margin of the clypeus and lateral margin of the pronotum reddish. The legs are brown-reddish and the antennal club is dark testaceous.
