= Ammoecius frigidus =

Scientific classification
- Kingdom: Animalia
- Phylum: Arthropoda
- Clade: Pancrustacea
- Class: Insecta
- Order: Coleoptera
- Suborder: Polyphaga
- Infraorder: Scarabaeiformia
- Family: Scarabaeidae
- Genus: Ammoecius
- Species: A. frigidus

Binomial name
- Ammoecius frigidus Brisout, 1866

Synonyms
- Aphodius (Ammoecius) frigidus galaicus Báguena, 1955

Species of beetle

Ammoecius frigidus is a species of beetle of the family Scarabaeidae. It is found in France, Morocco, Portugal and Spain.

== Description ==
Adults reach a length of about 4.5–6 mm (0.18–0.24 in). They have a strongly convex, shining, black body, with the anterior margin of the head reddish.
