= Ablaberoides quasitus =

Scientific classification
- Kingdom: Animalia
- Phylum: Arthropoda
- Class: Insecta
- Order: Coleoptera
- Suborder: Polyphaga
- Infraorder: Scarabaeiformia
- Family: Scarabaeidae
- Genus: Ablaberoides
- Species: A. quasitus

Binomial name
- Ablaberoides quasitus Péringuey, 1904

Species of beetle

Ablaberoides quasitus is a species of beetle of the family Scarabaeidae. It is found in South Africa (North West).

== Description ==
Adults reach a length of about 4.75 mm. They are dark bronze, while the elytra are light flavescent with the posterior part and the lateral margin infuscate. They are shining and sub-opaline, especially on the elytra. The antennae have the two basal joints and the antennal club fuscous, the remainder of the pedicel is rufescent.
