= Ablabera nigricans =

Scientific classification
- Kingdom: Animalia
- Phylum: Arthropoda
- Clade: Pancrustacea
- Class: Insecta
- Order: Coleoptera
- Suborder: Polyphaga
- Infraorder: Scarabaeiformia
- Family: Scarabaeidae
- Genus: Ablabera
- Species: A. nigricans

Binomial name
- Ablabera nigricans Burmeister, 1855

Species of beetle

Ablabera nigricans is a species of beetle of the family Scarabaeidae. It is found in South Africa (KwaZulu-Natal).

== Taxonomy and status ==
The species was described by Burmeister in 1855 in his Handbuch der Entomologie. It was notably omitted from the Catalogue of the Coleoptera of South Africa by Péringuey.
