= Acartus penicillatus =

Scientific classification
- Domain: Eukaryota
- Kingdom: Animalia
- Phylum: Arthropoda
- Class: Insecta
- Order: Coleoptera
- Suborder: Polyphaga
- Infraorder: Cucujiformia
- Family: Cerambycidae
- Genus: Acartus
- Species: A. penicillatus

Binomial name
- Acartus penicillatus (Aurivillius, 1907)

Species of beetle

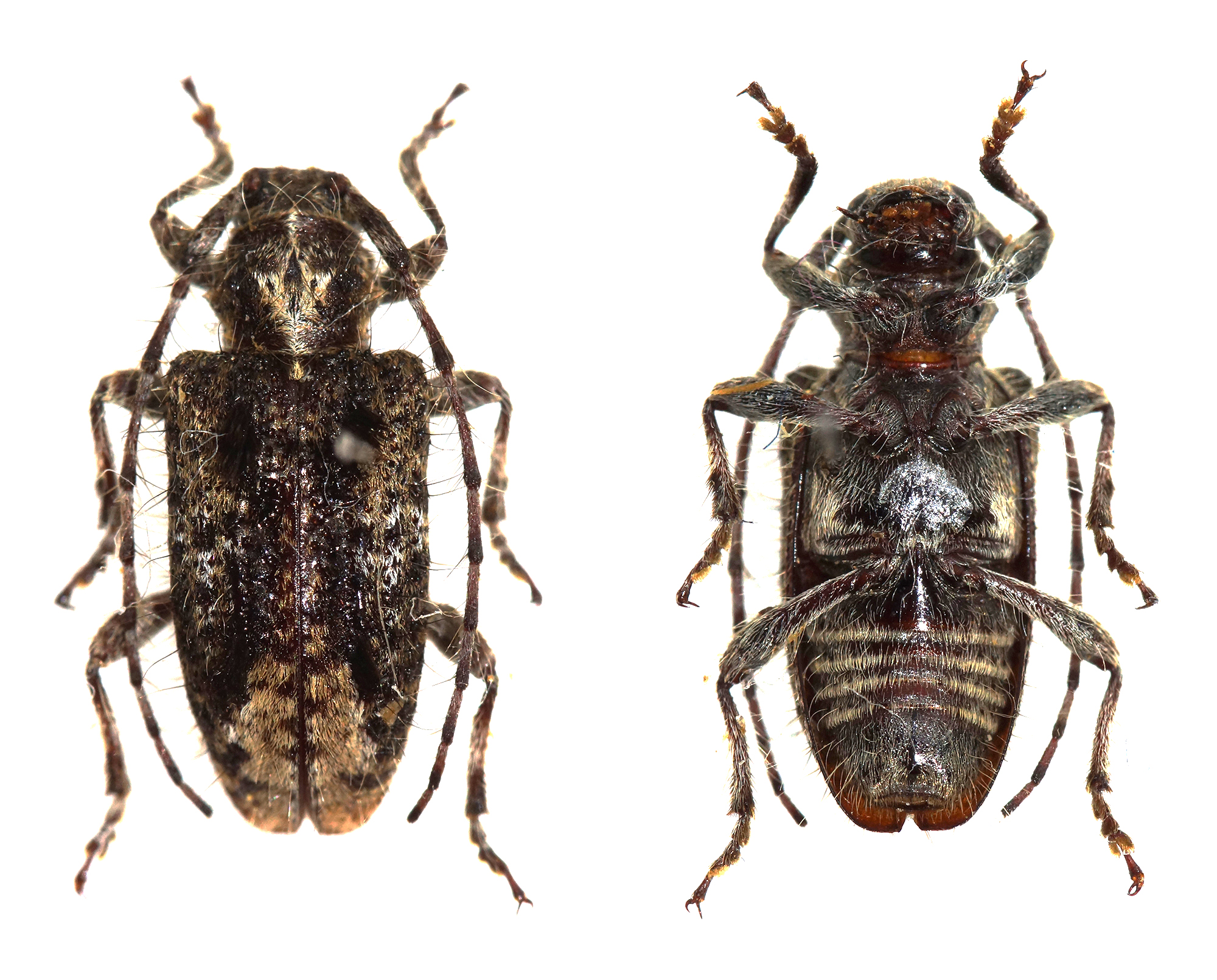

Acartus penicillatus is a species of beetle in the family Cerambycidae. It was described by Per Olof Christopher Aurivillius in 1907.
