= Ablaberoides cognatus =

Scientific classification
- Kingdom: Animalia
- Phylum: Arthropoda
- Class: Insecta
- Order: Coleoptera
- Suborder: Polyphaga
- Infraorder: Scarabaeiformia
- Family: Scarabaeidae
- Genus: Ablaberoides
- Species: A. cognatus

Binomial name
- Ablaberoides cognatus Péringuey, 1904

Species of beetle

Ablaberoides cognatus is a species of beetle of the family Scarabaeidae. It is found in Mozambique, South Africa (Limpopo) and Zimbabwe.

== Description ==
Adults reach a length of about 6.5 mm. They are very dark bronze, almost black, with the elytra somewhat dark brown, sub-opaque and only very faintly iridescent. The antennae are rufescent.
