= Ammoecius eli =

Scientific classification
- Kingdom: Animalia
- Phylum: Arthropoda
- Clade: Pancrustacea
- Class: Insecta
- Order: Coleoptera
- Suborder: Polyphaga
- Infraorder: Scarabaeiformia
- Family: Scarabaeidae
- Genus: Ammoecius
- Species: A. eli

Binomial name
- Ammoecius eli (Petrovitz, 1961)

Synonyms
- Aphodius (Ammoecius) eli Petrovitz, 1961

Species of beetle

Ammoecius eli is a species of beetle of the family Scarabaeidae. It is found in Iraq.

== Description ==
Adults reach a length of about 4.8 mm (0.19 in). They have a convex, glossy, reddish-brown body, with the head and pronotum somewhat darker. The legs are reddish-brown.
