= Ammoecius dogueti =

Scientific classification
- Kingdom: Animalia
- Phylum: Arthropoda
- Clade: Pancrustacea
- Class: Insecta
- Order: Coleoptera
- Suborder: Polyphaga
- Infraorder: Scarabaeiformia
- Family: Scarabaeidae
- Genus: Ammoecius
- Species: A. dogueti

Binomial name
- Ammoecius dogueti (Baraud, 1980)

Synonyms
- Aphodius (Ammoecius) dogueti Baraud, 1980

Species of beetle

Ammoecius dogueti is a species of beetle of the family Scarabaeidae. It is found in Algeria.

== Description ==
Adults reach a length of about 6–6.5 mm (0.24–0.26 in). They have an oblong-elongate, convex, shiny, glabrous, black body, with the margin of the clypeus and the legs dark brown-reddish and the antennal club testaceous.
