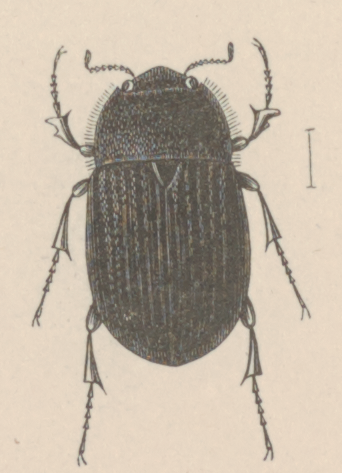
- Ablaberoides aeneus

Scientific classification
- Kingdom: Animalia
- Phylum: Arthropoda
- Clade: Pancrustacea
- Class: Insecta
- Order: Coleoptera
- Suborder: Polyphaga
- Infraorder: Scarabaeiformia
- Family: Scarabaeidae
- Genus: Ablaberoides; Blanchard, 1850

Species
- About 36 species (see text)

Synonyms
- Bielliana Baraud, 1980; Holoschiza Lansberge, 1886; Antitrochalus Brenske, 1902

= Ablaberoides =

Genus of beetles

Ablaberoides is a genus of beetles within the family Scarabaeidae. It occurs in Africa and the Arabian Peninsula.

== Species ==
There are 36 recognized species:

- Ablaberoides abyssinicus (Brenske, 1902)
- Ablaberoides aeneus Blanchard, 1850
- Ablaberoides breviusculus (Fåhraeus, 1857)
- Ablaberoides cognatus Péringuey, 1904
- Ablaberoides crassus (Fåhraeus, 1857)
- Ablaberoides decedens Péringuey, 1904
- Ablaberoides dentilabris (Lansberge, 1886)
- Ablaberoides dhofarensis Ahrens, 2000
- Ablaberoides ditissimus Péringuey, 1904
- Ablaberoides emeritus Péringuey, 1904
- Ablaberoides fahraei Péringuey, 1904
- Ablaberoides flavipennis (Fåhraeus, 1857)
- Ablaberoides fuliginosus (Thunberg, 1818)
- Ablaberoides gabonensis (Brenske, 1902)
- Ablaberoides haafi Frey, 1975
- Ablaberoides kapiriensis Moser, 1916
- Ablaberoides kochi Frey, 1975
- Ablaberoides laetulus Péringuey, 1904
- Ablaberoides lembanus Moser, 1916
- Ablaberoides loangoana (Brenske, 1902)
- Ablaberoides loangwanus Moser, 1918
- Ablaberoides maynei Burgeon, 1943
- Ablaberoides namaquanus Péringuey, 1904
- Ablaberoides naviauxi (Baraud, 1980)
- Ablaberoides nigrobrunnea (Brenske, 1902)
- Ablaberoides nitidulus Moser, 1916
- Ablaberoides obtusus Fåhraeus, 1857
- Ablaberoides ominosus Péringuey, 1904
- Ablaberoides pauper Péringuey, 1904
- Ablaberoides pavoninus Péringuey, 1904
- Ablaberoides quadrisignatus (Quedenfeldt, 1884)
- Ablaberoides quasitus Péringuey, 1904
- Ablaberoides rufovittatus (Péringuey, 1892)
- Ablaberoides schwetzi Moser, 1924
- Ablaberoides tardus Péringuey, 1904
- Ablaberoides tenellus (Fåhraeus, 1857)
- Ablaberoides testaceus (Fåhraeus, 1857)

BioLib treats Antitrochalus Brenske, 1902 and Trochaloserica Brenske, 1900 as synonyms of Ablaberoides and consequently lists a larger number of species (41) than included above.
