= Ammoecius lusitanicus =

Scientific classification
- Kingdom: Animalia
- Phylum: Arthropoda
- Clade: Pancrustacea
- Class: Insecta
- Order: Coleoptera
- Suborder: Polyphaga
- Infraorder: Scarabaeiformia
- Family: Scarabaeidae
- Genus: Ammoecius
- Species: A. lusitanicus

Binomial name
- Ammoecius lusitanicus Erichson, 1848

Species of beetle

Ammoecius lusitanicus is a species of beetle of the family Scarabaeidae. It is found in Morocco, Portugal and Spain.

== Description ==
Adults reach a length of about 4.5–5.5 mm (0.18–0.22 in). They have an elongate-oval, shiny, black body, with the legs dark brown.
