= Ablaberoides dhofarensis =

Scientific classification
- Kingdom: Animalia
- Phylum: Arthropoda
- Class: Insecta
- Order: Coleoptera
- Suborder: Polyphaga
- Infraorder: Scarabaeiformia
- Family: Scarabaeidae
- Genus: Ablaberoides
- Species: A. dhofarensis

Binomial name
- Ablaberoides dhofarensis Ahrens, 2000

Species of beetle

Ablaberoides dhofarensis is a species of beetle of the family Scarabaeidae. It is found in Oman.

== Description ==
Adults reach a length of about 5.1–5.2 mm. They have a yellowish-brown, short, oblong-oval body. The dorsal surface is glabrous, with iridescent tomentum.
