= Ablabera lalandei =

Scientific classification
- Kingdom: Animalia
- Phylum: Arthropoda
- Clade: Pancrustacea
- Class: Insecta
- Order: Coleoptera
- Suborder: Polyphaga
- Infraorder: Scarabaeiformia
- Family: Scarabaeidae
- Genus: Ablabera
- Species: A. lalandei

Binomial name
- Ablabera lalandei Blanchard, 1850

Species of beetle

Ablabera lalandei is a species of beetle of the family Scarabaeidae. It is found in South Africa (Western Cape).

== Description ==
Adults reach a length of about 7 mm. They are black and glabrous on the upper side (but fringed laterally with moderately dense greyish hairs). The club of the antennae is black, and the pedicel is rufescent. The punctures on the elytra are slightly wider and deeper than those on the prothorax.
