= Ammoecius muchei =

Scientific classification
- Kingdom: Animalia
- Phylum: Arthropoda
- Clade: Pancrustacea
- Class: Insecta
- Order: Coleoptera
- Suborder: Polyphaga
- Infraorder: Scarabaeiformia
- Family: Scarabaeidae
- Genus: Ammoecius
- Species: A. muchei

Binomial name
- Ammoecius muchei (Petrovitz, 1963)

Synonyms
- Aphodius (Ammoecius) muchei Petrovitz, 1963

Species of beetle

Ammoecius muchei is a species of beetle of the family Scarabaeidae. It is found in Turkey and possibly Greece.

== Description ==
Adults reach a length of about 6–6.5 mm (0.24–0.26 in). They have an oblong, strongly convex, shiny, glabrous, black body, with the margin of the clypeus brown-reddish. The legs are dark brownish with paler tarsi and the antennal club is yellowish.
