= Ablaberoides kochi =

Scientific classification
- Kingdom: Animalia
- Phylum: Arthropoda
- Class: Insecta
- Order: Coleoptera
- Suborder: Polyphaga
- Infraorder: Scarabaeiformia
- Family: Scarabaeidae
- Genus: Ablaberoides
- Species: A. kochi

Binomial name
- Ablaberoides kochi Frey, 1975

Species of beetle

Ablaberoides kochi is a species of beetle of the family Scarabaeidae. It is found in Somalia.

== Description ==
Adults reach a length of about 5.5–6 mm. The upper surface is black and bare, while the underside is blackish-brown and uniformly shiny. The antennae are brown. The pronotum is as finely punctate as the posterior margin, but less densely and sparsely punctate laterally.
