= Ammoecius brevis =

Scientific classification
- Kingdom: Animalia
- Phylum: Arthropoda
- Clade: Pancrustacea
- Class: Insecta
- Order: Coleoptera
- Suborder: Polyphaga
- Infraorder: Scarabaeiformia
- Family: Scarabaeidae
- Genus: Ammoecius
- Species: A. brevis

Binomial name
- Ammoecius brevis Erichson, 1848

Synonyms
- Aphodius brevis

Species of beetle

Ammoecius brevis is a species of beetle of the family Scarabaeidae. It is found in Armenia, Austria, Belarus, Belgium, Bosnia and Herzegovina, Bulgaria, Croatia, Cyprus, Denmark, Finland, France, Great Britain, Estonia, Georgia, Germany, Greece, Hungary, Italy, Kazakhstan, Latvia, Moldova, Mongolia, Montenegro, the Netherlands, Norway, Poland, Romania, Russia (including the Russian Far East and Siberia), Serbia, Slovakia, Slovenia, Spain, Sweden, Syria, Turkey, Turkmenistan and Ukraine.

== Description ==
Adults reach a length of about 3.5–4.5 mm (0.14–0.18 in). They have a very convex, short-oval, shiny, black body, with the anterior margin of the head reddish and the club of the antennae brown.
