= Acartus bituberosus =

Scientific classification
- Kingdom: Animalia
- Phylum: Arthropoda
- Class: Insecta
- Order: Coleoptera
- Suborder: Polyphaga
- Infraorder: Cucujiformia
- Family: Cerambycidae
- Genus: Acartus
- Species: A. bituberosus

Binomial name
- Acartus bituberosus Breuning, 1959

Species of beetle

Acartus bituberosus is a species of beetle in the family Cerambycidae. It was described by Stephan von Breuning in 1959.
