= Ablaberoides fahraei =

Scientific classification
- Kingdom: Animalia
- Phylum: Arthropoda
- Class: Insecta
- Order: Coleoptera
- Suborder: Polyphaga
- Infraorder: Scarabaeiformia
- Superfamily: Scarabaeoidea
- Family: Scarabaeidae
- Genus: Ablaberoides
- Species: A. fahraei

Binomial name
- Ablaberoides fahraei Péringuey, 1904

Synonyms
- Trochalus aeneus Fåhraeus, 1857

Species of beetle

Ablaberoides fahraei is a species of beetle in the family Scarabaeidae. It is found in South Africa (Limpopo, Cape) and Namibia.

== Description ==
Adults reach a length of about 5.75-6.5 mm. They have a reddish-bronze, ovate body, with the elytra often greener, and with an opaline sheen. The antennae and palpi are flavescent or rufescent.
