= Ablabera pellucida =

Scientific classification
- Kingdom: Animalia
- Phylum: Arthropoda
- Clade: Pancrustacea
- Class: Insecta
- Order: Coleoptera
- Suborder: Polyphaga
- Infraorder: Scarabaeiformia
- Family: Scarabaeidae
- Genus: Ablabera
- Species: A. pellucida

Binomial name
- Ablabera pellucida Burmeister, 1855

Species of beetle

Ablabera pellucida is a species of beetle of the family Scarabaeidae. It is found in South Africa (Cape).

== Taxonomy and status ==
The species was described by Burmeister in 1855 in his Handbuch der Entomologie. Péringuey listed it in his Catalogue of the Coleoptera of South Africa, but stated he was not able to identify the species.
