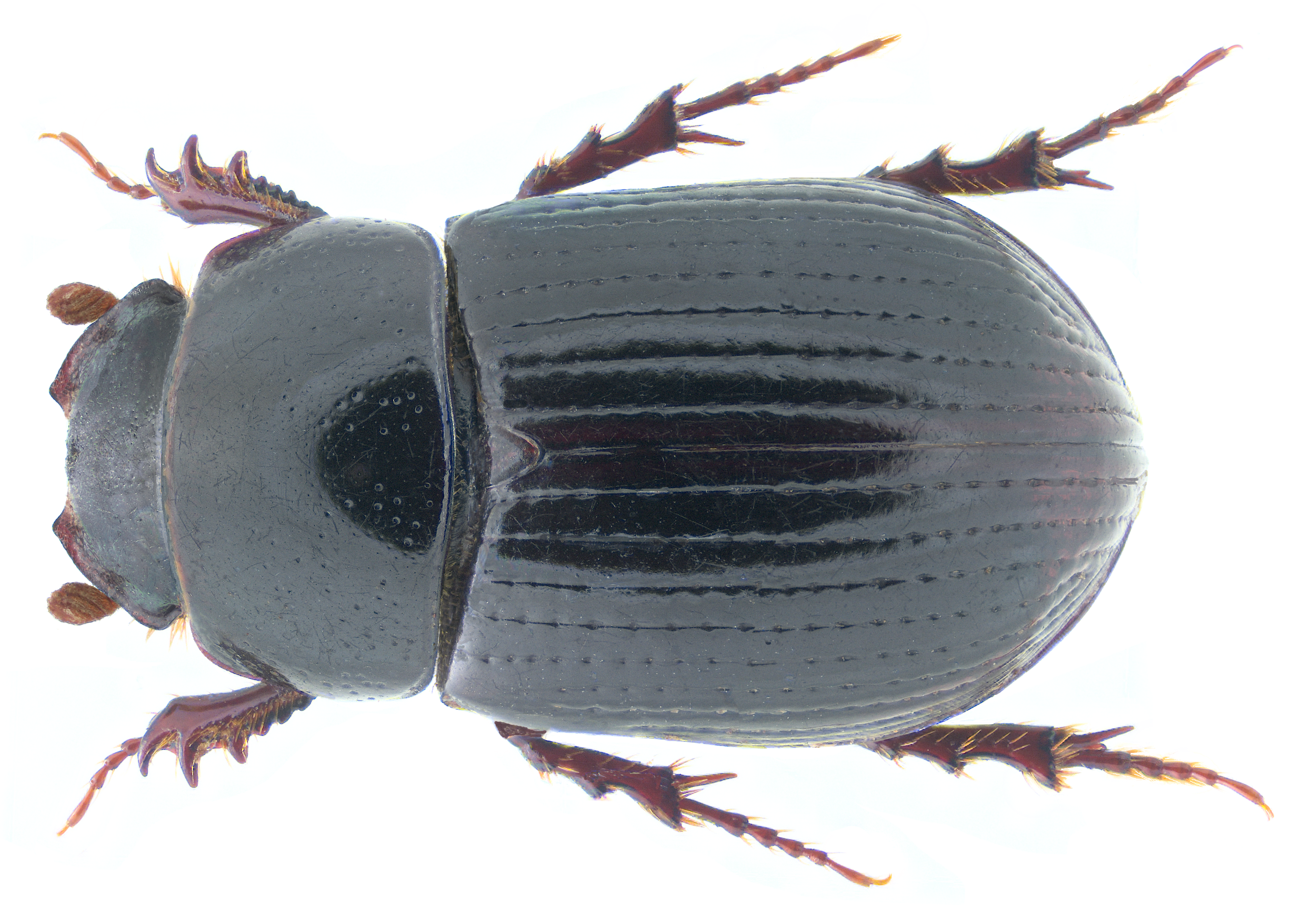

Scientific classification
- Kingdom: Animalia
- Phylum: Arthropoda
- Clade: Pancrustacea
- Class: Insecta
- Order: Coleoptera
- Suborder: Polyphaga
- Infraorder: Scarabaeiformia
- Family: Scarabaeidae
- Genus: Ammoecius
- Species: A. elevatus

Binomial name
- Ammoecius elevatus (Olivier, 1789)

Synonyms
- Scarabaeus elevatus Olivier, 1789; Aphodius (Ammoecius) elevatus persimilis Schatzmayr, 1946; Aphodius (Ammoecius) corellai Balthasar, 1941; Ammoecius chobauti Báguena, 1927; Ammoecius elevatus edentulus Mulsant, 1842; Ammoecius elevatus fusciventris Mulsant, 1842

= Ammoecius elevatus =

Species of beetle

Ammoecius elevatus is a species of beetle of the family Scarabaeidae. It is found in Algeria, France, Italy, Libya, Morocco, Portugal, Spain and Tunisia.

== Description ==
Adults reach a length of about 5–7 mm (0.20–0.28 in). They have an elongate-oval, strongly convex, shiny, glabrous, shiny black body, sometimes reddish ventrally.
