= Ablaberoides pavoninus =

Scientific classification
- Kingdom: Animalia
- Phylum: Arthropoda
- Class: Insecta
- Order: Coleoptera
- Suborder: Polyphaga
- Infraorder: Scarabaeiformia
- Family: Scarabaeidae
- Genus: Ablaberoides
- Species: A. pavoninus

Binomial name
- Ablaberoides pavoninus Péringuey, 1904

Species of beetle

Ablaberoides pavoninus is a species of beetle in the family Scarabaeidae. It is found in Mozambique.

== Description ==
Adults reach a length of about 7-7.25 mm. They are black and shining, with the elytra either brown or chestnut-brown and with a conspicuous iridescent sheen all over, which is more noticeable, however, on the elytra on account of their great convexity. The pedicel of the antennae is rufescent, and the club is black.
