= Ammoecius rugifrons =

Scientific classification
- Kingdom: Animalia
- Phylum: Arthropoda
- Clade: Pancrustacea
- Class: Insecta
- Order: Coleoptera
- Suborder: Polyphaga
- Infraorder: Scarabaeiformia
- Family: Scarabaeidae
- Genus: Ammoecius
- Species: A. rugifrons

Binomial name
- Ammoecius rugifrons Aube, 1850

Synonyms
- Ammoecius levaillanti Godart, 1852

Species of beetle

Ammoecius rugifrons is a species of beetle of the family Scarabaeidae. It is found in Algeria, Italy (Sardinia, Sicily), Morocco and Tunisia.

== Description ==
Adults reach a length of about 4–5.5 mm (0.16–0.22 in). They have a strongly convex, shining, black body, with the tibiae and tarsi reddish-brown.
