= Ablaberoides pauper =

Scientific classification
- Kingdom: Animalia
- Phylum: Arthropoda
- Class: Insecta
- Order: Coleoptera
- Suborder: Polyphaga
- Infraorder: Scarabaeiformia
- Family: Scarabaeidae
- Genus: Ablaberoides
- Species: A. pauper

Binomial name
- Ablaberoides pauper Péringuey, 1904

Species of beetle

Ablaberoides pauper is a species of beetle of the family Scarabaeidae. It is found in Namibia.

== Description ==
Adults reach a length of about 5.75–6 mm. They have a brownish-red and very slightly iridescent, elongate-ovate body. The antennae are flavescent.
