= Ablaberoides namaquanus =

Scientific classification
- Kingdom: Animalia
- Phylum: Arthropoda
- Class: Insecta
- Order: Coleoptera
- Suborder: Polyphaga
- Infraorder: Scarabaeiformia
- Family: Scarabaeidae
- Genus: Ablaberoides
- Species: A. namaquanus

Binomial name
- Ablaberoides namaquanus Péringuey, 1904

Species of beetle

Ablaberoides namaquanus is a species of beetle of the family Scarabaeidae. It is found in South Africa (Northern Cape).

== Description ==
Adults reach a length of about 7 mm. They are very dark bronze and nearly black underneath, and very dark brown on the elytra. The antennae are wholly flavescent. The body is very elongated.
