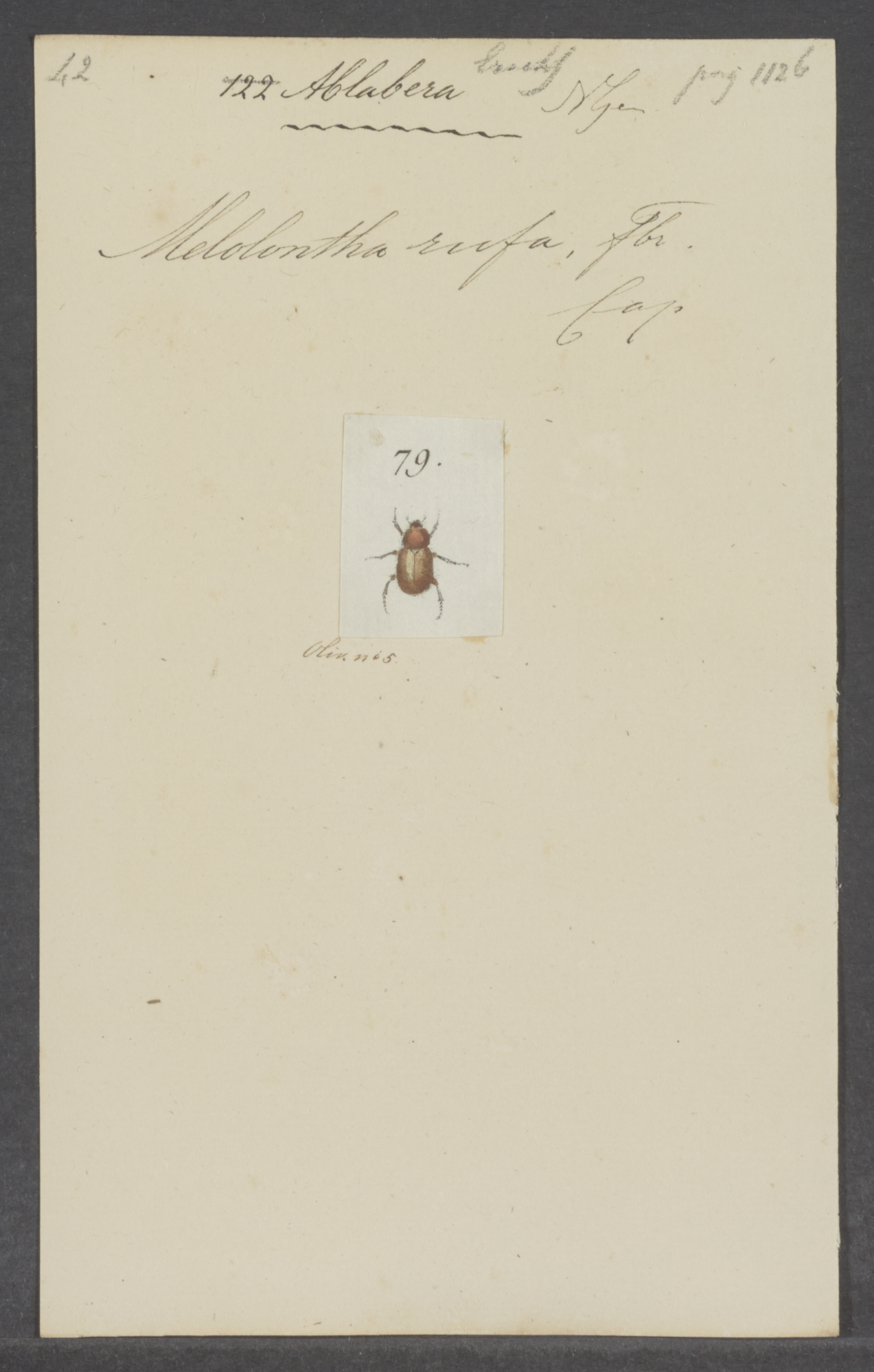
- Ablabera

Scientific classification
- Kingdom: Animalia
- Phylum: Arthropoda
- Class: Insecta
- Order: Coleoptera
- Suborder: Polyphaga
- Infraorder: Scarabaeiformia
- Family: Scarabaeidae
- Subfamily: Sericinae
- Tribe: Ablaberini
- Genus: Ablabera; Dejean, 1833

Synonyms
- Ablabera (Parablabera) Péringuey, 1904

= Ablabera =

Genus of beetles

Ablabera is a genus of beetles belonging to the family Scarabaeidae. The species of this genus are found in Southern Africa.

== Species ==
- Ablabera advena (Gyllenhal, 1817)
- Ablabera aeneobrunnea Fairmaire, 1886
- Ablabera amoena Péringuey, 1904
- Ablabera analis (Thunberg, 1818)
- Ablabera apicalis Fåhraeus, 1857
- Ablabera araneoides (Fabricius, 1792)
- Ablabera bagamojana Brenske, 1897
- Ablabera capicola Péringuey, 1904
- Ablabera clypeata (Gyllenhal, 1817)
- Ablabera delicatula Péringuey, 1908
- Ablabera flavoclypeata Wallengren, 1881
- Ablabera gratula Péringuey, 1904
- Ablabera gravidula Péringuey, 1904
- Ablabera haemorrhoa (Thunberg, 1818)
- Ablabera hirsuta Blanchard, 1850
- Ablabera hirticollis Péringuey, 1904
- Ablabera hopeiana Péringuey, 1904
- Ablabera hottentota Péringuey, 1904
- Ablabera iridescens Fairmaire, 1886
- Ablabera lalandei Blanchard, 1850
- Ablabera lutaria Harold, 1869
- Ablabera matabelena Péringuey, 1904
- Ablabera modesta Péringuey, 1904
- Ablabera namaqua Péringuey, 1904
- Ablabera nana (Gyllenhal, 1817)
- Ablabera nigricans Burmeister, 1855
- Ablabera pellucida Burmeister, 1855
- Ablabera pilosula Fåhraeus, 1857
- Ablabera pulicaria Fåhraeus, 1857
- Ablabera rostrata Burmeister, 1855
- Ablabera rufa (Fabricius, 1775)
- Ablabera rufipes Blanchard, 1850
- Ablabera setosa Frey, 1960
- Ablabera similata Burmeister, 1855
- Ablabera splendida (Fabricius, 1781)
- Ablabera tenebrosa Burmeister, 1855
- Ablabera totta (Thunberg, 1818)
- Ablabera transvaalica Péringuey, 1904
- Ablabera vidua Burmeister, 1855
