= Ablaberoides gabonensis =

Scientific classification
- Kingdom: Animalia
- Phylum: Arthropoda
- Class: Insecta
- Order: Coleoptera
- Suborder: Polyphaga
- Infraorder: Scarabaeiformia
- Family: Scarabaeidae
- Genus: Ablaberoides
- Species: A. gabonensis

Binomial name
- Ablaberoides gabonensis (Brenske, 1902)

Synonyms
- Holoschiza gabonensis Brenske, 1902

Species of beetle

Ablaberoides gabonensis is a species of beetle of the family Scarabaeidae. It is found in Gabon.

== Description ==
Adults reach a length of about 5 mm. They have a yellow, somewhat dull body.
