= Acartus =

Scientific classification
- Domain: Eukaryota
- Kingdom: Animalia
- Phylum: Arthropoda
- Class: Insecta
- Order: Coleoptera
- Suborder: Polyphaga
- Infraorder: Cucujiformia
- Family: Cerambycidae
- Tribe: Acanthocinini
- Genus: Acartus

Genus of beetles

Acartus is a genus of beetles of the tribe Acanthocinini of the subfamily Lamiinae, in the family Cerambycidae, containing the following species:

- Acartus abyssinicus Breuning, 1955
- Acartus biplagiatus (Aurivillius, 1926)
- Acartus bituberosus Breuning, 1959
- Acartus hirtus Fahroeus, 1872
- Acartus penicillatus (Aurivillius, 1907)
- Acartus rufus Breuning, 1964
- Acartus subinermis Lepesme & Breuning, 1957
