= Ablaberoides schwetzi =

Scientific classification
- Kingdom: Animalia
- Phylum: Arthropoda
- Clade: Pancrustacea
- Class: Insecta
- Order: Coleoptera
- Suborder: Polyphaga
- Infraorder: Scarabaeiformia
- Family: Scarabaeidae
- Genus: Ablaberoides
- Species: A. schwetzi

Binomial name
- Ablaberoides schwetzi Moser, 1924

Species of beetle

Ablaberoides schwetzi is a species of beetle of the family Scarabaeidae. It is found in the Democratic Republic of the Congo.

== Description ==
Adults reach a length of about 4.5 mm (0.18 in). They are small, oval, shining and reddish-brown. The head and pronotum, and sometimes the suture and lateral margins of the elytra are blackish.
