= Ablabera hirsuta =

Scientific classification
- Kingdom: Animalia
- Phylum: Arthropoda
- Clade: Pancrustacea
- Class: Insecta
- Order: Coleoptera
- Suborder: Polyphaga
- Infraorder: Scarabaeiformia
- Family: Scarabaeidae
- Genus: Ablabera
- Species: A. hirsuta

Binomial name
- Ablabera hirsuta Blanchard, 1850

Species of beetle

Ablabera hirsuta is a species of beetle of the family Scarabaeidae. It is found in South Africa (Western Cape).

== Description ==
Adults reach a length of about 6–7 mm. They are black, with the elytra testaceous-red, broadly infuscate along the base, the suture and the sides, or fuscous with a broad reddish patch in the posterior discoidal part. The prothorax and elytra are covered with long, erect, remote greyish setae there is a fringe of conspicuously long and dense setae along the outer margins.
