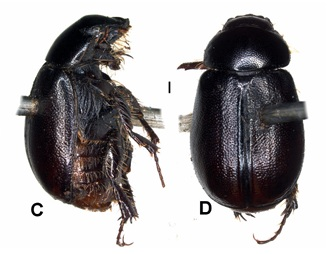

Scientific classification
- Kingdom: Animalia
- Phylum: Arthropoda
- Class: Insecta
- Order: Coleoptera
- Suborder: Polyphaga
- Infraorder: Scarabaeiformia
- Family: Scarabaeidae
- Subfamily: Sericinae
- Tribe: Ablaberini
- Genus: Ablabera
- Species: A. analis

Binomial name
- Ablabera analis (Thunberg, 1818)

Synonyms
- Melolontha analis Thunberg, 1818

= Ablabera analis =

Species of beetle first discovered by Carl Peter Thunberg in 1818

Ablabera analis, is a species of beetle first discovered by Carl Peter Thunberg in 1818. No sub-species are listed in the Catalogue of Life. It is found in South Africa.
