= Ablabera hopeiana =

Scientific classification
- Kingdom: Animalia
- Phylum: Arthropoda
- Clade: Pancrustacea
- Class: Insecta
- Order: Coleoptera
- Suborder: Polyphaga
- Infraorder: Scarabaeiformia
- Family: Scarabaeidae
- Genus: Ablabera
- Species: A. hopeiana

Binomial name
- Ablabera hopeiana Péringuey, 1904

Species of beetle

Ablabera hopeiana is a species of beetle of the family Scarabaeidae. It is found in South Africa (Western Cape).

== Description ==
Adults reach a length of about 6 mm. They are totally chestnut-red, with the frontal part of the head slightly fuscous. The pedicel of the antennae is rufescent, while the club is infuscate. The head and clypeus covered with somewhat deep, sub-contiguous punctures. The prothorax has punctures and a lateral fringe of hairs. The elytra are somewhat deeply punctured, and have a lateral fringe of hairs.
