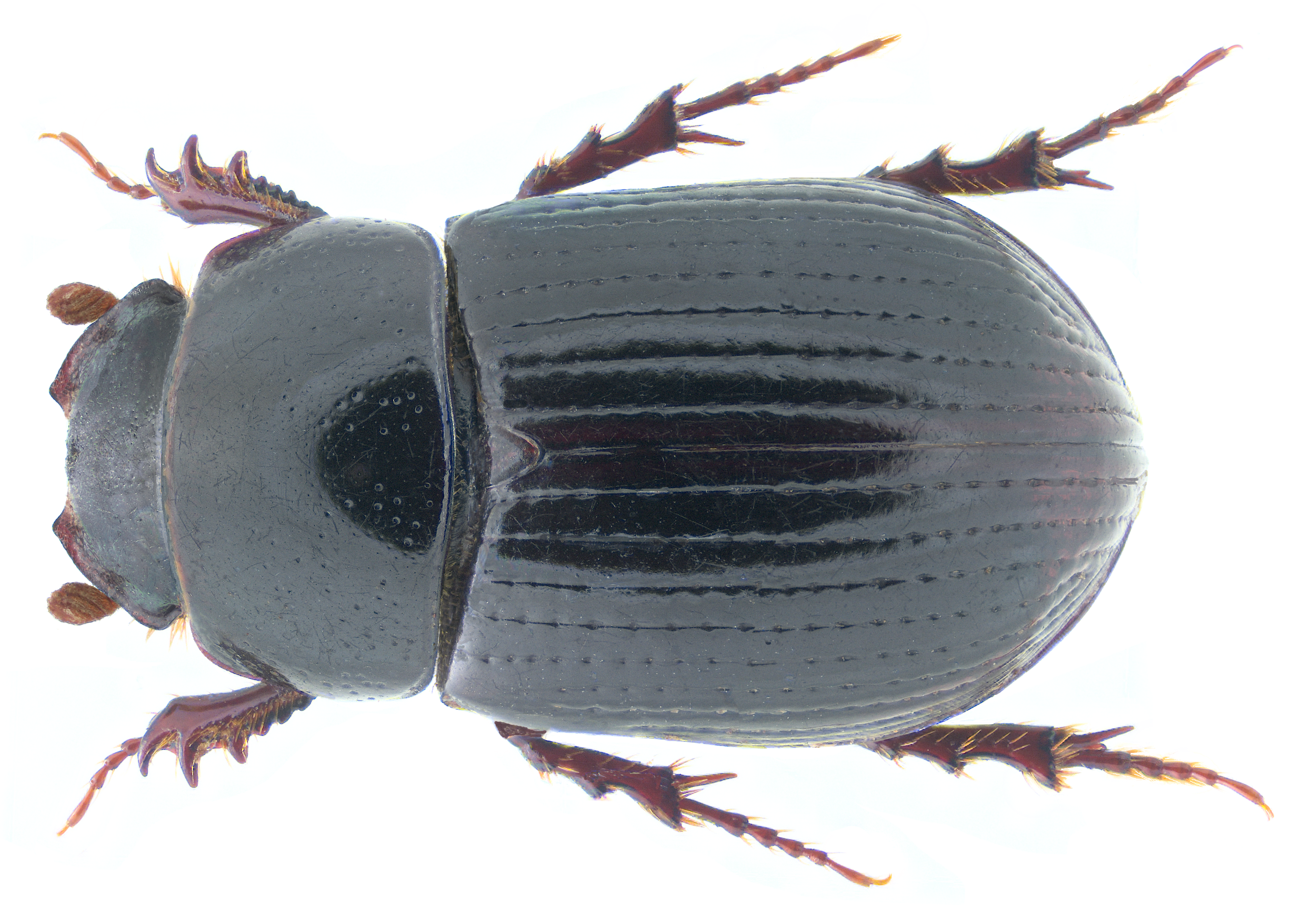
- Ammoecius elevatus, France

Scientific classification
- Kingdom: Animalia
- Phylum: Arthropoda
- Clade: Pancrustacea
- Class: Insecta
- Order: Coleoptera
- Suborder: Polyphaga
- Infraorder: Scarabaeiformia
- Family: Scarabaeidae
- Subfamily: Aphodiinae
- Tribe: Aphodiini
- Genus: Ammoecius; Mulsant, 1842

Synonyms
- Aphodius (Digonorhinus) Seabra, 1909

= Ammoecius =

Genus of beetles

Ammoecius is a genus of scarab beetles in the family Scarabaeidae. There are at least 20 described species in Ammoecius, found in Europe, Asia, and Africa.

== Species ==
These 20 species belong to the genus Ammoecius. Many of these species have been transferred from the genus Aphodius.

- Ammoecius amplicollis (Peyerimhoff, 1949)
- Ammoecius brevis Erichson, 1848
- Ammoecius dentatus Schmidt, 1908
- Ammoecius dogueti (Baraud, 1980)
- Ammoecius elevatus (Olivier, 1789)
- Ammoecius eli (Petrovitz, 1961)
- Ammoecius felscheanus Reitter, 1904
- Ammoecius franzi (Petrovitz, 1964)
- Ammoecius frigidus Brisout, 1866
- Ammoecius incultus (Petrovitz, 1961)
- Ammoecius lugubris (Boheman, 1857)
- Ammoecius lusitanicus Erichson, 1848
- Ammoecius meurguesae Clement, 1975
- Ammoecius mimus (Péringuey, 1901)
- Ammoecius muchei (Petrovitz, 1963)
- Ammoecius naviauxi (Baraud, 1971)
- Ammoecius numidicus Mulsant, 1851
- Ammoecius rugifrons Aube, 1850
- Ammoecius satanas (Carpaneto, 1976)
- Ammoecius terminatus Harold, 1869
