= Ablabera aeneobrunnea =

Scientific classification
- Kingdom: Animalia
- Phylum: Arthropoda
- Clade: Pancrustacea
- Class: Insecta
- Order: Coleoptera
- Suborder: Polyphaga
- Infraorder: Scarabaeiformia
- Family: Scarabaeidae
- Genus: Ablabera
- Species: A. aeneobrunnea

Binomial name
- Ablabera aeneobrunnea Fairmaire, 1886

Species of beetle

Ablabera aeneobrunnea is a species of beetle of the family Scarabaeidae. It is found in Madagascar.

== Description ==
Adults reach a length of about 6 mm (0.24 in). They may be distinguished by their oval shape, which is broadened and almost truncate at the rear, and its slightly metallic coloration, as well as by its thorax, which is not narrowed at the base.
