= Doleroserica =

Scientific classification
- Kingdom: Animalia
- Phylum: Arthropoda
- Class: Insecta
- Order: Coleoptera
- Suborder: Polyphaga
- Infraorder: Scarabaeiformia
- Family: Scarabaeidae
- Subfamily: Sericinae
- Tribe: Sericini
- Genus: Doleroserica; Péringuey, 1904

Genus of leaf beetles

Doleroserica is a genus of beetles belonging to the family Scarabaeidae.

== Species ==
- Doleroserica auspicata Péringuey, 1904
- Doleroserica carbonaria (Burmeister, 1855)
- Doleroserica curtula (Fåhraeus, 1858)
- Doleroserica festa Péringuey, 1904
- Doleroserica gentilis Péringuey, 1904
- Doleroserica laetula Péringuey, 1904
