= Ablaberoides emeritus =

Scientific classification
- Kingdom: Animalia
- Phylum: Arthropoda
- Class: Insecta
- Order: Coleoptera
- Suborder: Polyphaga
- Infraorder: Scarabaeiformia
- Family: Scarabaeidae
- Genus: Ablaberoides
- Species: A. emeritus

Binomial name
- Ablaberoides emeritus Péringuey, 1904

Species of beetle

Ablaberoides emeritus is a species of beetle of the family Scarabaeidae. It is found in Zimbabwe.

== Description ==
Adults reach a length of about 5.5-6.5 mm. They have a dark bronze, almost spherical body. It is shining, but without an opaline sheen. The antennae are ferruginous.
