= Ablaberoides naviauxi =

Scientific classification
- Kingdom: Animalia
- Phylum: Arthropoda
- Class: Insecta
- Order: Coleoptera
- Suborder: Polyphaga
- Infraorder: Scarabaeiformia
- Family: Scarabaeidae
- Genus: Ablaberoides
- Species: A. naviauxi

Binomial name
- Ablaberoides naviauxi (Baraud, 1980)

Synonyms
- Bielliana naviauxi Baraud, 1980

Species of beetle

Ablaberoides naviauxi is a species of beetle of the family Scarabaeidae. It is found in Saudi Arabia and Yemen.

== Description ==
Adults reach a length of about 5.5-6.6 mm. They have a yellowish-brown, oblong-oval body. The dorsal surface is glabrous.
