= Aparupa =

Scientific classification
- Domain: Eukaryota
- Kingdom: Animalia
- Phylum: Arthropoda
- Class: Insecta
- Order: Coleoptera
- Suborder: Adephaga
- Family: Carabidae
- Subfamily: Platyninae
- Tribe: Platynini
- Subtribe: Platynina
- Genus: Aparupa; Andrewes, 1930

Genus of beetles

Aparupa is a genus of beetles in the family Carabidae, found in Asia.

== Species ==
These 14 species belong to the genus Aparupa:

- Aparupa andrewesi Casale, 1980 (India)
- Aparupa beethami Andrewes, 1930 (China)
- Aparupa exophthalmica Andrewes, 1930 (India)
- Aparupa kaii Morvan, 1982 (Nepal)
- Aparupa kirschenhoferi Morvan, 1999 (Nepal)
- Aparupa magar J.Schmidt, 1998 (Nepal)
- Aparupa matsumurai Habu, 1973 (Nepal)
- Aparupa mirabilis Casale, 1983 (Nepal)
- Aparupa naviauxi Morvan, 1999 (Nepal)
- Aparupa nepalensis Casale, 1980 (Nepal)
- Aparupa rougemonti Morvan, 1999 (Nepal)
- Aparupa silvatica Deuve, 1983 (Nepal)
- Aparupa villosa Andrewes, 1930 (India)
- Aparupa waroki Morvan, 1982 (Nepal)
