= Ablabera pilosula =

Scientific classification
- Kingdom: Animalia
- Phylum: Arthropoda
- Clade: Pancrustacea
- Class: Insecta
- Order: Coleoptera
- Suborder: Polyphaga
- Infraorder: Scarabaeiformia
- Family: Scarabaeidae
- Genus: Ablabera
- Species: A. pilosula

Binomial name
- Ablabera pilosula Fåhraeus, 1857

Species of beetle

Ablabera pilosula is a species of beetle of the family Scarabaeidae. It is found in South Africa (Western Cape, KwaZulu-Natal).

== Description ==
Adults reach a length of about 5.25 mm. The head is infuscate, the prothorax reddish and the elytra are very pale testaceous (almost straw-colour). The head and anterior part of the clypeus are briefly, while the prothorax is densely pubescent. The elytra have rows of moderately long, erect, sub-flavescent hairs, which are greyish along the margins.
