= Ablabera amoena =

Scientific classification
- Kingdom: Animalia
- Phylum: Arthropoda
- Clade: Pancrustacea
- Class: Insecta
- Order: Coleoptera
- Suborder: Polyphaga
- Infraorder: Scarabaeiformia
- Family: Scarabaeidae
- Genus: Ablabera
- Species: A. amoena

Binomial name
- Ablabera amoena Péringuey, 1904

Species of beetle

Ablabera amoena is a species of beetle of the family Scarabaeidae. It is found in South Africa (Western Cape, KwaZulu-Natal).

== Description ==
Adults reach a length of about 9–11 mm. The clypeus and prothorax are light brick-red, the head fuscous and the elytra and under side are pale testaceous (almost straw-colour). The antennae are flavous. Both the head and clypeus are deeply punctured and glabrous. The prothorax is covered with equi-distant punctures and fringed laterally with a somewhat dense, greyish pubescence. The elytra are also covered with equi-distant punctures.
