= Ammoecius naviauxi =

Scientific classification
- Kingdom: Animalia
- Phylum: Arthropoda
- Clade: Pancrustacea
- Class: Insecta
- Order: Coleoptera
- Suborder: Polyphaga
- Infraorder: Scarabaeiformia
- Family: Scarabaeidae
- Genus: Ammoecius
- Species: A. naviauxi

Binomial name
- Ammoecius naviauxi (Baraud, 1971)

Synonyms
- Aphodius (Ammoecius) naviauxi Baraud, 1971

Species of beetle

Ammoecius naviauxi is a species of beetle of the family Scarabaeidae. It is found in Syria.

== Description ==
Adults reach a length of about 5.5 mm (0.22 in). They have a short, oval, strongly convex, shiny, glabrous, black body, with the margin of the clypeus and the legs piceous and the antennal club testaceous.
