= Ablaberoides testaceus =

Scientific classification
- Kingdom: Animalia
- Phylum: Arthropoda
- Class: Insecta
- Order: Coleoptera
- Suborder: Polyphaga
- Infraorder: Scarabaeiformia
- Family: Scarabaeidae
- Genus: Ablaberoides
- Species: A. testaceus

Binomial name
- Ablaberoides testaceus (Fåhraeus, 1857)

Synonyms
- Ablabera testacea Fåhraeus, 1857

Species of beetle

Ablaberoides testaceus is a species of beetle of the family Scarabaeidae. It is found in South Africa (Mpumalanga) and Zimbabwe.

== Description ==
Adults reach a length of about 5–6 mm. The head and prothorax are testaceous-red, while the elytra and under side are flavescent, without a metallic sheen. The antennae are wholly yellow.
