= Ablabera splendida =

Scientific classification
- Kingdom: Animalia
- Phylum: Arthropoda
- Clade: Pancrustacea
- Class: Insecta
- Order: Coleoptera
- Suborder: Polyphaga
- Infraorder: Scarabaeiformia
- Family: Scarabaeidae
- Genus: Ablabera
- Species: A. splendida

Binomial name
- Ablabera splendida (Fabricius, 1781)

Synonyms
- Melolontha splendida Fabricius, 1781; Ablabera emarginaticeps Blanchard, 1850; Ablabera luridipennis Blanchard, 1850; Melolontha lateralis Wiedemann, 1821; Melolontha notata Wiedemann, 1821; Melolontha splendens Gmelin, 1790

Species of beetle

Ablabera splendida is a species of beetle of the family Scarabaeidae. It is found in South Africa (Western Cape, Eastern Cape).

== Description ==
Adults reach a length of about 6–7.5 mm. They are black, with the elytra pale testaceous (but with a broad basal black band). The sutural and a lateral one vary somewhat in width. They are glabrous on the upper side and fringed along the prothorax and the elytral margins with long but somewhat remote pallid bristles. The antennal club is infuscate with the three basal joints of the pedicel rufescent.
