= Olof Fåhræus =

Swedish politician and entomologist

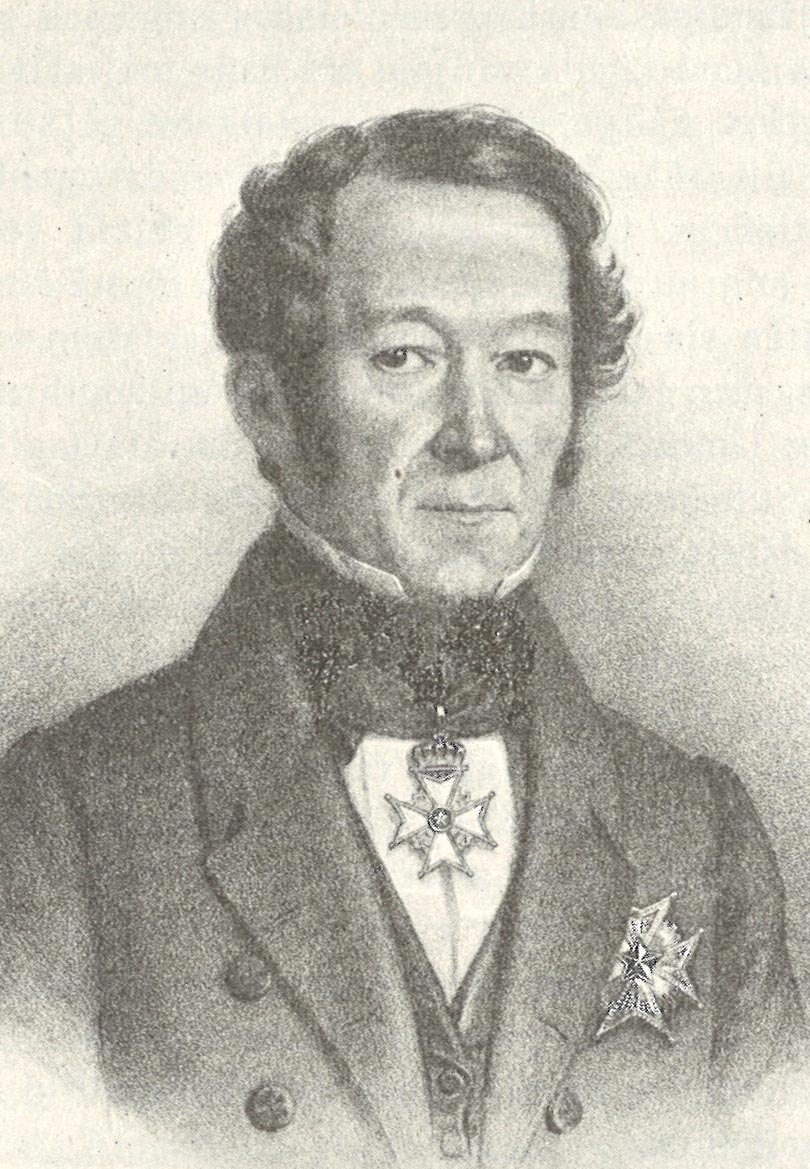
Olof Fåhræus (1796-1884)

Olof Immanuel Fåhræus (23 March 1796 – 28 May 1884), was a Swedish civil servant, politician and entomologist mainly interested in Coleoptera.

== Biography ==
Fåhræus was born in Othem Parish, Gotland. He entered Uppsala University in 1810, where he graduated in 1815. He started a career as a civil servant in 1816 and spent most of that career in the Swedish General Customs Board, where he was head of the western customs district from 1826 to 1840. During this time he participated in two committees on customs reform, where Fåhræus voiced liberal views. In 1840, a new Swedish government was formed under Arvid Mauritz Posse, then director general of the Customs Board. He recruited Fåhræus as Minister for Civil Service Affairs, a post which he held from 1840 to 1847. In 1842 he was elevated to the nobility. In 1847, he asked to leave his post as minister and was succeeded by his twin brother Fredrik Fåhræus. Instead, Fåhræus served as Governor of Gothenburg and Bohus County from 1847 to 1864 and then as chairman of the board of the Bank of Sweden from 1867 to 1872. He participated in meetings of the Riksdag of the Estates, the Swedish parliament, from 1844 to 1866 as a member of the nobility. He was an elected member of the upper chamber of the reformed Riksdag from 1867 to 1878.

Fåhræus had an interested in the natural sciences since his youth, and was particularly interested in entomology. In 1833 he took the initiative to form the Gothenburg Museum of Natural History. His entomological collection is shared between the natural history museums of Stockholm and Gothenburg. Together with Carl Henrik Boheman he authored Insecta Caffrariae annis 1838-1845 a J.A. Wahlberg collecta. Coleoptera. Holmiae : Fritze & Norstedt Vol. 1 pp. 299–625 published in 1851.

Fåhræus was elected a member of the Royal Swedish Academy of Sciences in 1840 and received an honorary doctorate from Uppsala University in 1877. He died in Stockholm.
