= Frankenberger =

Frankenberger is a German language habitational surname denoting a person originally living in any one of several settlements named Frankenberg ("mountain of the Franks") and may refer to:

- Andy Frankenberger, American poker player
- J. T. Frankenberger (1935–2019), former Canadian football player
- Sebastian Frankenberger (born 1981), former German politician
- Uwe Frankenberger (born 1955), German politician
- Zdeněk Frankenberger (1892–1966), Czech malacologist and zoologist
