= Chilothorax subpolitus =

Scientific classification
- Kingdom: Animalia
- Phylum: Arthropoda
- Clade: Pancrustacea
- Class: Insecta
- Order: Coleoptera
- Suborder: Polyphaga
- Infraorder: Scarabaeiformia
- Family: Scarabaeidae
- Genus: Chilothorax
- Species: C. subpolitus

Binomial name
- Chilothorax subpolitus Motschulsky, 1860

Species of beetle

Chilothorax subpolitus is a species of beetle of the family Scarabaeidae. It is was described from Siberia.

== Taxonomy ==
In his 1964 Monographie der Scarabaeidae und Aphodidae der Palaearktischen und Orientalischen Region, Vladimír Balthasar stated that the original description by Victor Motschulsky is so inadequate that it might be considered a nomen nudum.
