= Frankenburg =

Frankenburg is German for "Frankish castle" and may refer to:

Places:

- Frankenburg am Hausruck, a market village in the district of Vöcklabruck in Upper Austria
- a hamlet in the municipality of Lilienthal in Lower Saxony, Germany

Castles or castle ruins:

- Frankenburg (Hegau), abandoned castle near Singen (Hohentwiel)-Bohlingen in the county of Konstanz in Baden-Württemberg, Germany
- Frankenburg (Palatinate), ruined castle in the county of Südliche Weinstraße in Rhineland-Palatinate, Germany
- Château du Frankenbourg, ruined castle near Sélestat-Neubois in the Alsatian département of Bas-Rhin, France (German name: Frankenburg).
- Frankenburg (Upper Austria), abandoned castle in the village of Frankenburg am Hausruck in Upper Austria
- Hausmannsturm (Bad Frankenhausen), above Bad Frankenhausen, Thuringia, Germany
- Frankenberg Castle, in Aachen, Germany

People:

- Julius Frankenburg
- Richard Frankenburg
- Hans, Count of Khevenhüller-Frankenburg

Others

- Frankenburg Technologies, a defence technology startup from Estonia

== See also ==
- Frankenberg (disambiguation)
