= Jaromír Šámal =

Czech zoologist (1900–1942)

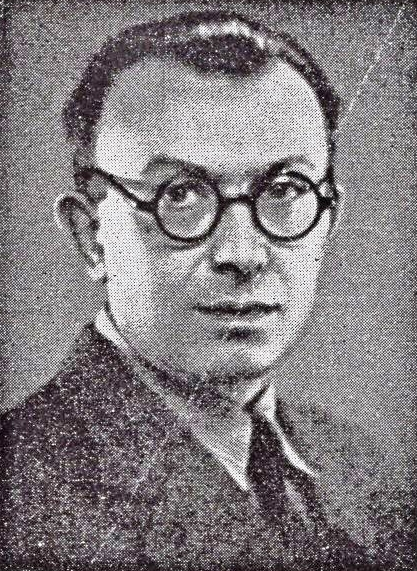
Šámal in the 1930s

Jaromír Šámal (12 July 1900 – 5 June 1942) was a Czech zoologist and entomologist. He served as a professor of agriculture at the Czech Technical University. He specialized on aquatic organisms including insects, particularly the stoneflies and mayflies.

== Life and work ==
Šámal was the son of the Czech leader Přemysl Šámal (1867–1941) who was part of the anti-Austrian and anti-Nazi resistance. After his high school he went to Charles University where he studied under professor Alois Mrázek and Julius Komárek. He received a doctorate in 1923 and became an assistant to Jaromír Wenig and later Jiří Janda. He then joined the Czech Technical University where he became a professor of zoology in 1935. He also worked on fisheries projects.

He married Milada née Cebeová (1906–1981) who was also a zoologist and they had two children. During the German invasion of 1939 he went into hiding and joined the resistance movement. Both his parents were arrested, his mother was taken to Auschwitz while his father died in 1941. His wife was arrested and sent to concentration camps in Terezín, Auschwitz and Ravensbrück and their two children were taken to Germany for re-education. After the war, they were found and repatriated. Šámal was arrested in May and following the assassination of Reinhard Heydrich, he was executed along with others by Nazi forces by shooting at Kobylisy on 5 June 1942. The mayfly species Ecdynonurus samalorum was named after the couple.
