= Zdeněk Frankenberger =

Zdeněk Frankenberger (24 January 1892 – 12 January 1966) was a Czech anatomist and zoologist. He specialized in the isopods of the Slovak region while also serving as a professor of embyrology and histology at Charles University in Prague. He had a special interest in cave organisms and described the cave isopod Mesoniscus graniger.

== Life ==
Frankenberger was born in Prague in a family of medical doctors. He studied at the Prague grammar school and went to the medical faculty at Charles University in 1911. He received a medical degree in 1917 and was sent to the Italian front with the outbreak of World War I. He suffered from malaria but returned to work at the Institute of Embryology and Histology at Charles University from 1919 as an assistant. He habilitated in 1920 and went to work under Auguste Prenant in Paris. He returned in 1921 as a professor of embryology and histology at Ljubljana. From 1927 he was a full professor at Comenius University, Bratislava. When Bohemia was separated from Slovakia in 1938 he moved to Charles University in Prague. During World War II, he worked at a hospital in Prague and after the war he was director of the institute of embryology until his retirement in 1962. He died in Černošice.

Frankenberger worked on malacology with Jozef Florián Babor and then moved to the study of isopods. In 1937 he worked with Vladimír Balthasar on the isopods of Slovakia. In 1939 he examined cave faunas and collected in Bohemia, Moravia and other parts of the Balkans. He also examined the collections in the National Museum at Prague from Mesopotamia and Turkey. He also collected specimens of insects and several species of beetle have been named after him including the genus Frankenbergerius.
