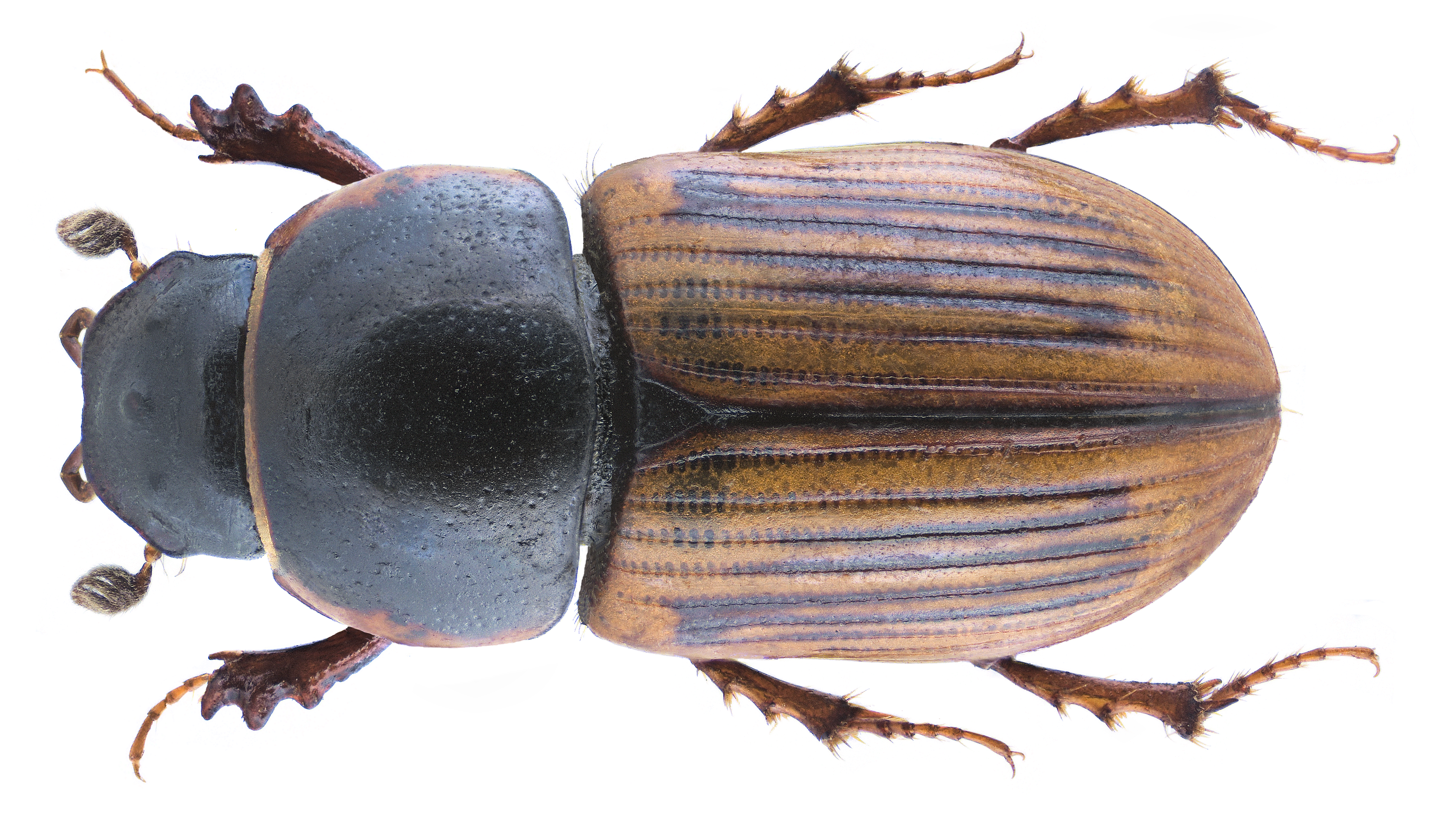

Scientific classification
- Kingdom: Animalia
- Phylum: Arthropoda
- Clade: Pancrustacea
- Class: Insecta
- Order: Coleoptera
- Suborder: Polyphaga
- Infraorder: Scarabaeiformia
- Family: Scarabaeidae
- Genus: Chilothorax
- Species: C. lineolatus

Binomial name
- Chilothorax lineolatus (Illiger, 1803)

Synonyms
- Aphodius lineolatus Illiger, 1803; Aphodius (Chilothorax) lineolatus lateconjunctus Dellacasa, 1983; Aphodius (Chilothorax) lineolatus latevirgatus Dellacasa, 1983; Aphodius (Volinus) lineolatus assimulans Mackauer, 1958; Aphodius lineolatus virgatus Schmidt, 1917; Aphodius nigrolineatus Rosenhauer, 1847; Aphodius lineolatus conjunctus Mulsant, 1842; Aphodius lineolatus deletus Mulsant, 1842; Aphodius lineolatus fuscicollis Mulsant, 1842; Aphodius lineolatus vittatus Mulsant, 1842; Aphodius lateralis Brullé, 1832

= Chilothorax lineolatus =

Species of beetle

Chilothorax lineolatus is a species of beetle of the family Scarabaeidae. It is found in Albania, Algeria, Armenia, Croatia, Cyprus, France, Greece, Israel, Italy, Libya, Malta, Morocco, Portugal, Serbia, Spain, Tunisia and Turkey.

== Description ==
Adults reach a length of about 4–4.5 mm (0.16–0.18 in). They have a strongly convex, shiny, glabrous body. The head and pronotum are blackish-brown to black, the latter with a yellow lateral margin. The elytra are yellowish-brown, with the sutural interval dark and blackened striae. The legs are brown.
