= Chilothorax tanhensis =

Scientific classification
- Kingdom: Animalia
- Phylum: Arthropoda
- Clade: Pancrustacea
- Class: Insecta
- Order: Coleoptera
- Suborder: Polyphaga
- Infraorder: Scarabaeiformia
- Family: Scarabaeidae
- Genus: Chilothorax
- Species: C. tanhensis

Binomial name
- Chilothorax tanhensis (Frolov, 2001)

Synonyms
- Aphodius (Chilothorax) tanhensis Frolov, 2001

Species of beetle

Chilothorax tanhensis is a species of beetle of the family Scarabaeidae. It is found in Mongolia.

== Description ==
Adults reach a length of about 5.2–5.6 mm (0.20–0.22 in). The head is dark brown and shiny and the pronotum is shiny, dark brown on disc, but light brownish on the sides. The elytra are yellowish-brown and shiny, with a pattern of longitudinal brown spots.

== Etymology ==
The name of the species is derived from the type locality, Tanhe.
