= Chilothorax discedens =

Scientific classification
- Kingdom: Animalia
- Phylum: Arthropoda
- Clade: Pancrustacea
- Class: Insecta
- Order: Coleoptera
- Suborder: Polyphaga
- Infraorder: Scarabaeiformia
- Family: Scarabaeidae
- Genus: Chilothorax
- Species: C. discedens

Binomial name
- Chilothorax discedens (Schmidt, 1907)

Synonyms
- Aphodius discedens Schmidt, 1907

Species of beetle

Chilothorax discedens is a species of beetle of the family Scarabaeidae. It is found in Israel, Jordan and Palestine.

== Description ==
Adults reach a length of about 4.5–5 mm (0.18–0.20 in). The head and pronotum are dark reddish-brown, with lighter sides. The elytra are light brown, with a dark suture and reddish-brown spots.
