= Chilothorax conspurcatus =

Scientific classification
- Kingdom: Animalia
- Phylum: Arthropoda
- Clade: Pancrustacea
- Class: Insecta
- Order: Coleoptera
- Suborder: Polyphaga
- Infraorder: Scarabaeiformia
- Family: Scarabaeidae
- Genus: Chilothorax
- Species: C. conspurcatus

Binomial name
- Chilothorax conspurcatus (Linnaeus, 1758)

Synonyms
- Scarabaeus conspurcatus Linnaeus, 1758; Aphodius (Chilothorax) conspurcatus epotus Dellacasa, 1983; Aphodius (Chilothorax) conspurcatus heptamaculatus Dellacasa, 1983; Aphodius (Chilothorax) conspurcatus novemmaculatus Dellacasa, 1983; Aphodius (Chilothorax) conspurcatus scalaris Dellacasa, 1983

Species of beetle

Chilothorax conspurcatus is a species of beetle of the family Scarabaeidae. It is found in Austria, Belarus, Belgium, Bulgaria, Croatia, Finland, France, Germany, Great Britain, Italy, Latvia, Lithuania, Montenegro, Norway, Poland, Portugal, Romania, Russia, Serbia, Slovakia, Slovenia, Spain, Sweden and Ukraine.

== Description ==
Adults reach a length of about 4–5 mm (0.16–0.20 in). They have an oblong, convex, shiny, glabrous, blackish body. The head has pale testaceous spots and the sides of the pronotum are reddish. The elytra are pale yellowish with the suture and seven spots blackish.
