= Marie Zdeňka Baborová-Čiháková =

Czech botanist and zoologist (1877-1937)

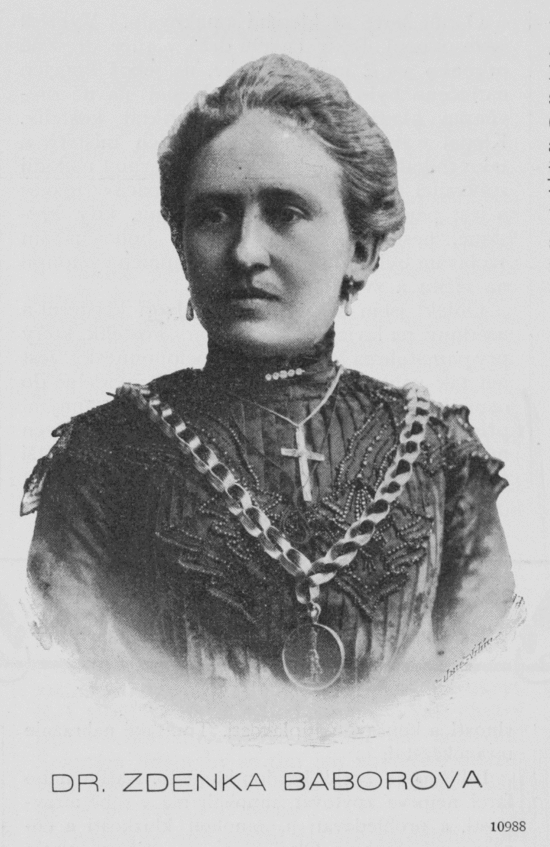
Marie Zdeňka Baborová-Čiháková

Marie Zdeňka Baborová-Čiháková (17 January 1877, Prague – 29 September 1937, Čelákovice) was the first female Czech botanist and zoologist. Baborová was born in Prague to a school teacher's family and learned many languages at a young age. She studied at the Minerva secondary school before studying natural sciences at the Charles-Ferdinand University in Prague. She studied zoology and wrote her dissertation on fat bodies in arthropods and in 1901 became the first woman to be awarded a doctorate. An older brother Josef Florián Babor was also a physician and zoologist at the University. Josef had inspired her own studies but she worked under Frantisek Vejdovsky (1849–1939). She contributed entries on infusoria and protozoa for Otto's Encyclopedia. Baborová married Stanislav Ćihak in 1903. She cut back on her studies in 1906 after the birth of her daughter.

== Works ==
- Klapálek, František; Šulc, Karel; Babor, Josef Florián; Baborová-Čiháková, Marie Zdeňka; Janda, Jiří (1914). Velký illustrovaný přírodopis všech tří říší. II II (in Czech). Rašín : Ústř. naklad. a knihkup. učit. čsl. OCLC 85486951.

== See also ==
- Timeline of women in science
