= Chilothorax clausula =

Scientific classification
- Kingdom: Animalia
- Phylum: Arthropoda
- Clade: Pancrustacea
- Class: Insecta
- Order: Coleoptera
- Suborder: Polyphaga
- Infraorder: Scarabaeiformia
- Family: Scarabaeidae
- Genus: Chilothorax
- Species: C. clausula

Binomial name
- Chilothorax clausula (Koshantschikov, 1910)

Synonyms
- Aphodius (Volinus) clausula Koshantschikov, 1910; Aphodius (Dimendius) c-nigrum Olsoufieff, 1929; Aphodius (Mendidius) eremobius Semenov & Medvedev, 1929; Aphodius (Mendidius) gussakovskii Semenov & Medvedev, 1929

Species of beetle

Chilothorax clausula is a species of beetle of the family Scarabaeidae. It is found in Tajikistan, Turkmenistan and Uzbekistan.

== Description ==
Adults reach a length of about 2.5–3 mm (0.098–0.118 in). They have a shiny, blackish-brown body, with the anterior of the head and the sides of the pronotum lighter. The elytra are yellowish-brown with a dark suture and two dark longitudinal bands.
