= Chilothorax cervorum =

Scientific classification
- Kingdom: Animalia
- Phylum: Arthropoda
- Clade: Pancrustacea
- Class: Insecta
- Order: Coleoptera
- Suborder: Polyphaga
- Infraorder: Scarabaeiformia
- Family: Scarabaeidae
- Genus: Chilothorax
- Species: C. cervorum

Binomial name
- Chilothorax cervorum (Fairmaire, 1871)

Synonyms
- Aphodius cervorum Fairmaire, 1871; Aphodius (Chilothorax) cervorum paralunatus Dellacasa, 1983; Aphodius (Chilothorax) cervorum paranubilus Dellacasa, 1983; Aphodius (Chilothorax) cervorum parapauper Dellacasa, 1983; Aphodius (Volinus) vernicosus Hoffmann, 1928

Species of beetle

Chilothorax cervorum is a species of beetle of the family Scarabaeidae. It is found in France, Portugal and Spain.

== Description ==
Adults reach a length of about 4–5 mm (0.16–0.20 in). They have a moderately convex, shiny, glabrous body. The forebody is black, with the front of the head and the sides of the pronotum yellow. The elytra are yellow-brown with a dark sutural interval and dark spots. The legs are red-brown.
