= Chilothorax equitis =

Scientific classification
- Kingdom: Animalia
- Phylum: Arthropoda
- Clade: Pancrustacea
- Class: Insecta
- Order: Coleoptera
- Suborder: Polyphaga
- Infraorder: Scarabaeiformia
- Family: Scarabaeidae
- Genus: Chilothorax
- Species: C. equitis

Binomial name
- Chilothorax equitis (Koshantschikov, 1912)

Synonyms
- Aphodius (Volinus) equitis Koshantschikov, 1912

Species of beetle

Chilothorax equitis is a species of beetle of the family Scarabaeidae. It is found in Syria and Iraq.

== Description ==
Adults reach a length of about 4.5–4.8 mm (0.18–0.19 in). They have an elongate, rather convex, highly glossy, glabrous body. The forebody is black, with the margins of the head and pronotum reddish. The elytra are yellowish-brown, with a characteristic pattern. The legs and antennal club are brown.
