= Alois Mrázek =

Czech zoologist (1868–1923)

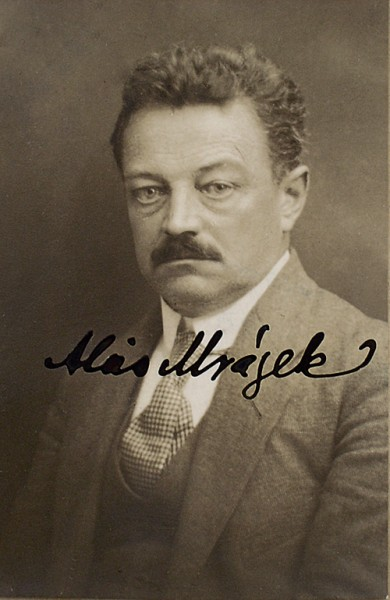
- Born: 9 June 1868; Příbram, Austria-Hungary
- Died: 26 November 1923 (aged 55); Prague, Czechoslovakia
- Education: Charles University
- Occupation: zoologist

Alois Mrázek (9 June 1868 – 26 November 1923) was a Czech zoologist. He was a professor at the Charles University and was a specialist on the Crustacea and Copepoda. He also examined the ant, oligochaetes, and nematode fauna.

Mrázek was born in Příbram, the son of a mining academy professor. He studied at the philosophy faculty of the Charles Ferdinand University and worked under Antonín Frič and from 1893 became an assistant of František Vejdovský. His early work was on comparative anatomy and he worked along with Karl Herfort, Josef Florián Babor, Karl Šulec, František Karel Studnička and others. He received his doctorate in 1896 and became a docent of zoology. In 1905 he became an extraordinary professor and for some time worked as a librarian at the Royal Czech Society of Sciences. He studied hermaphroditism in the Crustacea. He became interested in the complex life cycles of helminths and became a co-editor of the Journal of Parasitology. He also studied protozoan parasites. Along with Vejdovský he worked on the development of eggs. He succeeded Vejdovský in 1919 and was especially interested in hydrobiology and established an aquarium at the university. He was a member of the Bohemian Academy of Sciences. He collected specimens extensively and went on expeditions into caves including the Lipská Pečina near Cetyn. He was a noted teacher and gave lectures on evolutionary ideas. He was known for his openness and directness but poor health led to an early death. His students included Jaroslav Štorkán.
