= Chilothorax flavimargo =

Scientific classification
- Kingdom: Animalia
- Phylum: Arthropoda
- Clade: Pancrustacea
- Class: Insecta
- Order: Coleoptera
- Suborder: Polyphaga
- Infraorder: Scarabaeiformia
- Family: Scarabaeidae
- Genus: Chilothorax
- Species: C. flavimargo

Binomial name
- Chilothorax flavimargo (Reitter, 1901)

Synonyms
- Aphodius (Volinus) flavimargo Reitter, 1901; Aphodius (Volinus) flavimargo basghulanus Balthasar, 1955; Aphodius (Volinus) flavimargo perturbator Balthasar, 1955

Species of beetle

Chilothorax flavimargo is a species of beetle of the family Scarabaeidae. It is found in Afghanistan, China (Xinjiang), Kazakhstan, Kyrgyzstan, Tajikistan, Turkmenistan and Uzbekistan.

== Description ==
Adults reach a length of about 3.6–4.2 mm (0.14–0.17 in). They have an elongate-oval, convex, moderately shiny body. The head and pronotum are black, the latter with a yellow margin. The scutellum is dark and the elytra are light yellowish-brown, with a darkened suture and an oval black spot.
