= Chilothorax propola =

Scientific classification
- Kingdom: Animalia
- Phylum: Arthropoda
- Clade: Pancrustacea
- Class: Insecta
- Order: Coleoptera
- Suborder: Polyphaga
- Infraorder: Scarabaeiformia
- Family: Scarabaeidae
- Genus: Chilothorax
- Species: C. propola

Binomial name
- Chilothorax propola (Balthasar, 1946)

Synonyms
- Aphodius (Volinus) propola Balthasar, 1946

Species of beetle

Chilothorax propola is a species of beetle of the family Scarabaeidae. It is found in Kyrgyzstan, Tajikistan, Turkmenistan and Uzbekistan.

== Description ==
Adults reach a length of about 4 mm (0.16 in). They have an elongate, moderately convex, shining body, with some short, sparse, light-colored hairs at the apex. The head and pronotum are black, the former reddish anteriorly and laterally, and the pronotum is reddish at the anterior angles. The elytra are yellowish-brown with a dark sutural interval and dark brown spots. The underside is brown.
