= Chilothorax ivanovi =

Scientific classification
- Kingdom: Animalia
- Phylum: Arthropoda
- Clade: Pancrustacea
- Class: Insecta
- Order: Coleoptera
- Suborder: Polyphaga
- Infraorder: Scarabaeiformia
- Family: Scarabaeidae
- Genus: Chilothorax
- Species: C. ivanovi

Binomial name
- Chilothorax ivanovi (Lebedev, 1911)

Synonyms
- Aphodius (Mendidius) ivanovi Lebedev, 1911

Species of beetle

Chilothorax ivanovi is a species of beetle of the family Scarabaeidae. It is found in Russia and Ukraine.

== Description ==
Adults reach a length of about 3.5–4.5 mm (0.14–0.18 in). They have a strongly convex, moderately shiny, glabrous, blackish-brown body, with the front of the head and the sides of the pronotum light brown. The scutellum is brown and the elytra are light yellowish-brown with a dark sutural interval and dark markings. The legs are brown.
