= Chilothorax paykulli =

Scientific classification
- Kingdom: Animalia
- Phylum: Arthropoda
- Clade: Pancrustacea
- Class: Insecta
- Order: Coleoptera
- Suborder: Polyphaga
- Infraorder: Scarabaeiformia
- Family: Scarabaeidae
- Genus: Chilothorax
- Species: C. paykulli

Binomial name
- Chilothorax paykulli (Bedel, 1908)

Synonyms
- Aphodius paykulli Bedel, 1908; Aphodius tessulatus basalis Schilsky, 1888; Aphodius tessulatus gutheili Schilsky, 1888; Aphodius tessulatus amplificatus Mulsant, 1842; Aphodius tessulatus appendiculatus Mulsant, 1842; Aphodius tessulatus connexus Mulsant, 1842; Aphodius tessulatus dilatatus Mulsant, 1842; Aphodius tessulatus intricatus Mulsant, 1842; Aphodius tessulatus irregularis Mulsant, 1842]; Aphodius tessulatus scutellatus Mulsant, 1842; Aphodius tessulatus umbrosus Mulsant, 1842; Scarabaeus tessulatus Paykull, 1798; Scarabaeus inquinatus Olivier, 1789

Species of beetle

Chilothorax paykulli is a species of beetle of the family Scarabaeidae. It is found in Armenia, Austria, Azerbaijan, Belarus, Belgium, Bosnia Herzegovina, Bulgaria, Croatia, the Czech Republic, Denmark, Estonia, Finland, France, Germany, Great Britain, Greece, Hungary, Ireland, Israel, Italy, Latvia, Lebanon, Morocco, the Netherlands, Norway, Poland, Portugal, Romania, Russia, Slovenia, Slovakia, Spain, Sweden, Switzerland, Tunisia, Turkey and Ukraine.

== Description ==
Adults reach a length of about 3.5–4.5 mm (0.14–0.18 in). They have a strongly convex, shiny, glabrous, black body, with the pronotum sometimes reddish-translucent at the sides. The elytra are yellowish-brown with a blackened suture and blackish-brown markings.
