= Chilothorax kandaharicus =

Scientific classification
- Kingdom: Animalia
- Phylum: Arthropoda
- Clade: Pancrustacea
- Class: Insecta
- Order: Coleoptera
- Suborder: Polyphaga
- Infraorder: Scarabaeiformia
- Family: Scarabaeidae
- Genus: Chilothorax
- Species: C. kandaharicus

Binomial name
- Chilothorax kandaharicus (Balthasar, 1961)

Synonyms
- Aphodius (Volinus) kandaharicus Balthasar, 1961; Aphodius (Volinus) ulcerosus Balthasar, 1961

Species of beetle

Chilothorax kandaharicus is a species of beetle of the family Scarabaeidae. It is found in Afghanistan.

== Description ==
Adults reach a length of about 3.7–4.5 mm (0.15–0.18 in). They have an oblong-oval, moderately convex, glossy body. The head and pronotum are blackish-brown, with the anterior margin of the head and the anterior angles of the pronotum light reddish-brown. The elytra are yellowish-brown, with a darkened suture and dark brown markings. The ventral surface is brown and the legs are reddish-brown.
