= Chilothorax hieroglyphicus =

Scientific classification
- Kingdom: Animalia
- Phylum: Arthropoda
- Clade: Pancrustacea
- Class: Insecta
- Order: Coleoptera
- Suborder: Polyphaga
- Infraorder: Scarabaeiformia
- Family: Scarabaeidae
- Genus: Chilothorax
- Species: C. hieroglyphicus

Binomial name
- Chilothorax hieroglyphicus (Klug, 1830)

Synonyms
- Aphodius hieroglyphicus Klug, 1830; Aphodius (Chilothorax) hieroglyphicus elapsus Dellacasa, 1983; Aphodius magicus Fairmaire, 1875; Aphodius maculosus Wollaston, 1864

Species of beetle

Chilothorax hieroglyphicus is a species of beetle of the family Scarabaeidae. It is found in Algeria, the Canary Islands, Libya, Morocco, Spain, Syria and Tunisia.

== Description ==
Adults reach a length of about 5–6 mm (0.20–0.24 in). They have a rather slender, slightly convex, shiny body. The center of the head and the disc of the pronotum are brown to reddish-brown, with the margins yellow. The elytra are light yellowish-brown, with a darkened suture and reddish-brown spots.
