= Chilothorax melanostictus =

Scientific classification
- Kingdom: Animalia
- Phylum: Arthropoda
- Clade: Pancrustacea
- Class: Insecta
- Order: Coleoptera
- Suborder: Polyphaga
- Infraorder: Scarabaeiformia
- Family: Scarabaeidae
- Genus: Chilothorax
- Species: C. melanostictus

Binomial name
- Chilothorax melanostictus (Schmidt, 1840)

Synonyms
- Aphodius melanostictus Schmidt, 1840; Chilothorax melanostictus anomalus Negrobov, 2011; Chilothorax melanostictus anulatus Negrobov, 2011; Chilothorax melanostictus atypicus Negrobov, 2011; Chilothorax melanostictus coalitus Negrobov, 2011; Chilothorax melanostictus cornutus Negrobov, 2011; Chilothorax melanostictus daedalus Negrobov, 2011; Chilothorax melanostictus hemisphaericus Negrobov, 2011; Chilothorax melanostictus imperfectus Negrobov, 2011; Chilothorax melanostictus perruptus Negrobov, 2011; Chilothorax melanostictus pseudonasutus Negrobov, 2011; Chilothorax melanostictus rufus Negrobov, 2011; Chilothorax melanostictus semistepposus Negrobov, 2011; Chilothorax melanostictus siliquiformis Negrobov, 2011; Chilothorax melanostictus vermiculatus Negrobov, 2011; Aphodius (Chilothorax) melanostictus biastatus Dellacasa, 1983; Aphodius (Chilothorax) melanostictus maxiannulatus Dellacasa, 1983; Aphodius (Chilothorax) melanostictus nasutus Dellacasa, 1983; Aphodius (Chilothorax) melanostictus pilleolatus Dellacasa, 1983; Aphodius (Chilothorax) melanostictus plusannulatus Dellacasa, 1983; Aphodius (Chilothorax) melanostictus ridens Dellacasa, 1983; Aphodius (Chilothorax) melanostictus subastatus Dellacasa, 1983; Aphodius (Chilothorax) melanostictus subcatenatus Dellacasa, 1983; Aphodius (Volinus) transformis Balthasar, 1965; Aphodius (Volinus) elbursicola Balthasar, 1961; Aphodius (Volinus) melanostictoides Balthasar, 1961; Aphodius (Volinus) melanostictus basalis Báguena, 1927; Aphodius erraticus circumclusus Schmidt, 1917; Aphodius hieroglyphicus castilianus Daniel, 1903; Aphodius (Volinus) tescorum Semenov, 1898; Aphodius lituratus Rey, 1890; Aphodius melanostictus bifasciatus Dalla Torre, 1879; Aphodius melanostictus biguttatus Dalla Torre, 1879; Aphodius melanostictus lineata Dalla Torre, 1879; Aphodius pillularius Gistel, 1857; Aphodius graphicus Kolenati, 1846; Aphodius melanostictus graphicus Kolenati, 1846; Aphodius melanostictus catenatus Mulsant, 1842; Aphodius melanostictus egenus Mulsant, 1842; Aphodius melanostictus septemmaculatus Mulsant, 1842; Aphodius melanostictus sexmaculatus Mulsant, 1842; Aphodius melanostictus subannulatus Mulsant, 1842; Scarabaeus conspurcatus Herbst, 1789; Aphodius (Volinus) melanostictus simulans Koshantschikov, 1913

Species of beetle

Chilothorax melanostictus is a species of beetle of the family Scarabaeidae. It is found in Afghanistan, Algeria, Armenia, Austria, Azerbaijan, Belarus, Belgium, Bosnia Herzegovina, Bulgaria, China (Tianjin), Croatia, the Czech Republic, Egypt, France, Georgia, Germany, Greece, Hungary, Iran, Israel, Jordan, Kazakhstan, Kyrgyzstan, Latvia, Lebanon, Libya, Lithuania, Macedonia, Mongolia, Morocco, Poland, Romania, Russia (including the Russian Far East, Siberia), Slovakia, Spain, Switzerland, Tajikistan, Tunisia, Turkey, Turkmenistan, Ukraine and Uzbekistan.

== Description ==
Adults reach a length of about 5–7 mm (0.20–0.28 in). They have a moderately convex, elongate-oval, shiny, black body, the pronotum with yellowish-red sides. The scutellum is dark and the elytra are yellowish-brown with a darkened suture and blackish-brown markings. The pattern is highly variable. The legs are light to dark reddish-brown.

== Subspecies ==
- Chilothorax melanostictus melanostictus (Afghanistan, Algeria, Armenia, Austria, Azerbaijan, Belarus, Belgium, Bosnia Herzegovina, Bulgaria, China (Tianjin), Croatia, Czech Republic, Egypt, France, Georgia, Germany, Greece, Hungary, Iran, Israel, Jordan, Kazakhstan, Kyrgyzstan, Latvia, Lebanon, Libya, Lithuania, Macedonia, Mongolia, Morocco, Poland, Romania, Russia (including the Russian Far East, Siberia), Slovakia, Spain, Switzerland, Tajikistan, Tunisia, Turkey, Turkmenistan, Ukraine)
- Chilothorax melanostictus simulans (Koshantschikov, 1913) (Iran, Ukraine, Uzbekistan)
