= Chilothorax flammulatus =

Scientific classification
- Kingdom: Animalia
- Phylum: Arthropoda
- Clade: Pancrustacea
- Class: Insecta
- Order: Coleoptera
- Suborder: Polyphaga
- Infraorder: Scarabaeiformia
- Family: Scarabaeidae
- Genus: Chilothorax
- Species: C. flammulatus

Binomial name
- Chilothorax flammulatus (Harold, 1876)

Synonyms
- Aphodius flammulatus Harold, 1876; Aphodius (Volinus) deplanatus Reitter, 1892

Species of beetle

Chilothorax flammulatus is a species of beetle of the family Scarabaeidae. It is found in Armenia, Georgia, Turkmenistan and Azerbaijan.

== Description ==
Adults reach a length of about 4–5 mm (0.16–0.20 in). They have an elongate, fairly parallel-sided, slightly convex, glabrous, shining body. The forebody is black, while the elytra are yellowish-red with a dark brown spot. The legs are reddish-brown.
