= Chilothorax hucklesbyi =

Scientific classification
- Kingdom: Animalia
- Phylum: Arthropoda
- Clade: Pancrustacea
- Class: Insecta
- Order: Coleoptera
- Suborder: Polyphaga
- Infraorder: Scarabaeiformia
- Family: Scarabaeidae
- Genus: Chilothorax
- Species: C. hucklesbyi

Binomial name
- Chilothorax hucklesbyi (Paulian, 1942)

Synonyms
- Volinus hucklesbyi Paulian, 1942

Species of beetle

Chilothorax hucklesbyi is a species of beetle of the family Scarabaeidae. It is found in Palestine.

== Description ==
Adults reach a length of about 3 mm (0.12 in). They have a rather broadly oval, convex, shiny, glabrous body. The forebody is black and the anterior angles of the pronotum are reddish. The scutellum is brown and the elytra are yellowish-brown, with the sutural interval black and with two brown spots, as well as an elongated spot, followed by a transverse spot.
