= Chilothorax pamirensis =

Scientific classification
- Kingdom: Animalia
- Phylum: Arthropoda
- Clade: Pancrustacea
- Class: Insecta
- Order: Coleoptera
- Suborder: Polyphaga
- Infraorder: Scarabaeiformia
- Family: Scarabaeidae
- Genus: Chilothorax
- Species: C. pamirensis

Binomial name
- Chilothorax pamirensis (Medvedev, 1928)

Synonyms
- Aphodius (Volinus) pamirensis Medvedev, 1928

Species of beetle

Chilothorax pamirensis is a species of beetle of the family Scarabaeidae. It is found in Afghanistan, Kyrgyzstan and Tajikistan.

== Description ==
Adults reach a length of about 5.5–6 mm (0.22–0.24 in). They have a moderately glossy, black body, with the clypeus reddish anteriorly, the pronotum with a yellowish tinge on the sides, and the elytra yellowish-brown with a blackened suture and blackish-brown lateral markings. The legs are dark brown.
