= Chilothorax planus =

Scientific classification
- Kingdom: Animalia
- Phylum: Arthropoda
- Clade: Pancrustacea
- Class: Insecta
- Order: Coleoptera
- Suborder: Polyphaga
- Infraorder: Scarabaeiformia
- Family: Scarabaeidae
- Genus: Chilothorax
- Species: C. planus

Binomial name
- Chilothorax planus (Koshantschikov, 1894)

Synonyms
- Aphodius (Melinopterus) planus Koshantschikov, 1894; Aphodius transvolgensis Semenov, 1898

Species of beetle

Chilothorax planus is a species of beetle of the family Scarabaeidae. It is found in Iran, Kazakhstan, Russia (including Siberia), Turkmenistan and Ukraine.

== Description ==
Adults reach a length of about 4.5–6 mm (0.18–0.24 in). They have a narrow, fairly parallel, weakly convex, glossy body. The head and pronotum are black, with the sides of the latter somewhat lighter. The elytra are yellowish-brown with a blackish suture and blackish-brown markings. The legs are dark.
