= Chilothorax mossulensis =

Scientific classification
- Kingdom: Animalia
- Phylum: Arthropoda
- Clade: Pancrustacea
- Class: Insecta
- Order: Coleoptera
- Suborder: Polyphaga
- Infraorder: Scarabaeiformia
- Family: Scarabaeidae
- Genus: Chilothorax
- Species: C. mossulensis

Binomial name
- Chilothorax mossulensis (Mulsant & Godart, 1879)

Synonyms
- Aphodius (Melinopterus) mossulensis Mulsant & Godart, 1879

Species of beetle

Chilothorax mossulensis is a species of beetle of the family Scarabaeidae. It is found in Iraq.

== Description ==
Adults reach a length of about 4 mm (0.16 in). They have an elongate, convex, shiny body. The head and pronotum are black, with the sides of the latter reddish-yellow. The elytra are yellowish-brown with black spots.
