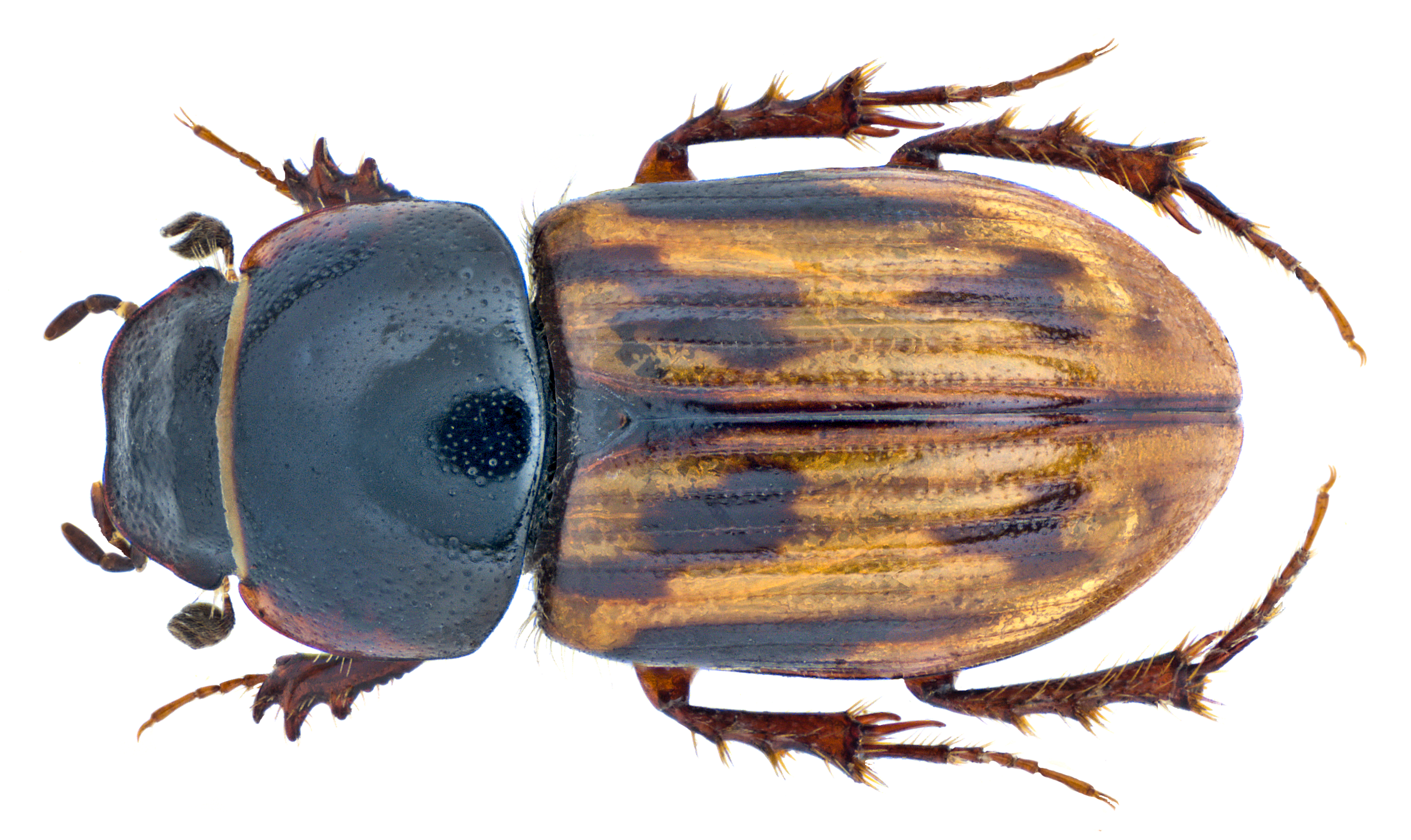

Scientific classification
- Kingdom: Animalia
- Phylum: Arthropoda
- Clade: Pancrustacea
- Class: Insecta
- Order: Coleoptera
- Suborder: Polyphaga
- Infraorder: Scarabaeiformia
- Family: Scarabaeidae
- Genus: Chilothorax
- Species: C. distinctus

Binomial name
- Chilothorax distinctus (Müller, 1776)

Synonyms
- Scarabaeus distinctus Müller, 1776; Aphodius (Volinus) libyanus Balthasar, 1961; Aphodius (Volinus) distinctus centrolineatoides Strand & Gulbis, 1957; Aphodius (Volinus) distinctus distinctoides Strand & Gulbis, 1957; Aphodius (Volinus) distinctus nubiloides Strand & Gulbis, 1957; Aphodius (Volinus) distinctus principalis Strand & Gulbis, 1957; Aphodius (Volinus) distinctus pseudonubilus Strand & Gulbis, 1957; Aphodius (Volinus) distinctus pulcheroides Strand & Gulbis, 1957; Aphodius (Volinus) distinctus subconfluens Strand & Gulbis, 1957; Aphodius (Volinus) distinctus trifasciata Strand & Gulbis, 1957; Aphodius (Volinus) inquinatus lopezromeui Báguena, 1927; Aphodius (Volinus) melanostictus humeralis Báguena, 1927; Aphodius (Volinus) inquinatus striatulus Eichler, 1924; Aphodius (Volinus) inquinatulus Reitter, 1898; Aphodius hypocoprus Gistel, 1857; Scarabaeus inquinatus Herbst, 1783; Chilothorax distinctus apicalus Negrobov, 2011; Chilothorax distinctus clypeolatus Negrobov, 2011; Chilothorax distinctus humerus Negrobov, 2011; Chilothorax distinctus niger Negrobov, 2011; Chilothorax distinctus nonmaculatus Negrobov, 2011; Chilothorax distinctus pseudaltaicus Negrobov, 2011; Chilothorax distinctus variabilus Negrobov, 2011; Aphodius inquinatus confluens Schilsky, 1888; Aphodius maculipennis Melsheimer, 1845; Aphodius inquinatus anxius Mulsant, 1842; Aphodius inquinatus auctus Mulsant, 1842; Aphodius inquinatus baseolus Mulsant, 1842; Aphodius inquinatus fumosus Mulsant, 1842; Aphodius inquinatus hemicyclus Mulsant, 1842; Aphodius inquinatus interruptus Mulsant, 1842; Aphodius inquinatus lunatus Mulsant, 1842; Aphodius inquinatus ophthalmicus Mulsant, 1842; Aphodius inquinatus pauper Mulsant, 1842; Aphodius inquinatus scutellaris Mulsant, 1842; Aphodius inquinatus subcinctus Mulsant, 1842; Scarabaeus attaminatus Marsham, 1802; Scarabaeus foedatus Marsham, 1802; Scarabaeus centrolineatus Panzer, 1798; Scarabaeus nubilus Panzer, 1798; Scarabaeus conspurcatus Schrank, 1781; Scarabaeus tessulatus Laicharting, 1781; Scarabaeus vaginosus Voet, 1769

= Chilothorax distinctus =

Species of beetle

Chilothorax distinctus is a species of beetle of the family Scarabaeidae. It is widespread in the Palearctic and Nearctic regions.

== Description ==
Adults reach a length of about 3.5–5.5 mm (0.14–0.22 in). They have a quite strongly convex, shining body. The head and pronotum are black, the latter with lighter sides. The elytra are yellowish-brown, with a darkened suture and dark spots, which are arranged in a very variable pattern.

== Distribution ==
Palaearctic: Albania, Armenia, Austria, Azerbaijan, Belarus, Belgium, Bosnia Herzegovina, Bulgaria, Croatia, the Czech Republic, Denmark, Estonia, Finland, France, Georgia, Germany, Great Britain, Greece, Hungary, Iran, Israel, Italy, Kazakhstan, Kyrgyzstan, Latvia, Libya, Lithuania, Macedonia, Moldova, Mongolia, Norway, Poland, Portugal, Romania, Russia (including Siberia), Serbia, Slovakia, Slovenia, Spain, Sweden, Switzerland, Syria, Tunisia, Turkey, Ukraine. Nearctic: United States (Florida, California, Colorado, Indiana, Iowa, Maryland, Oklahoma, Texas, Wisconsin), Canada (Alberta, British Columbia, Manitoba, Nova Scotia, Ontario, Quebec, Saskatchewan).
