= Chilothorax clathratus =

Scientific classification
- Kingdom: Animalia
- Phylum: Arthropoda
- Clade: Pancrustacea
- Class: Insecta
- Order: Coleoptera
- Suborder: Polyphaga
- Infraorder: Scarabaeiformia
- Family: Scarabaeidae
- Genus: Chilothorax
- Species: C. clathratus

Binomial name
- Chilothorax clathratus (Reitter, 1892)

Synonyms
- Aphodius (Volinus) clathratus Reitter, 1892; Aphodius (Chilothorax) distinctus sevanicus Rakovič, 1991

Species of beetle

Chilothorax clathratus is a species of beetle of the family Scarabaeidae. It is found in Armenia, Azerbaijan, Iran, Kazakhstan, Russia, Tajikistan, Turkey, Turkmenistan and Uzbekistan.

== Description ==
Adults reach a length of about 5–6 mm (0.20–0.24 in). They have a strongly convex, shiny, black body, with the frontal margin of the head and the lateral margins of the pronotum yellowish-red. The elytra are yellowish-brown with a black sutural interval and dark spots. The legs are brown.

== Life history ==
Both adults and larvae have been recorded feeding on horse dung.
