= Chilothorax auliensis =

Scientific classification
- Kingdom: Animalia
- Phylum: Arthropoda
- Clade: Pancrustacea
- Class: Insecta
- Order: Coleoptera
- Suborder: Polyphaga
- Infraorder: Scarabaeiformia
- Family: Scarabaeidae
- Genus: Chilothorax
- Species: C. auliensis

Binomial name
- Chilothorax auliensis (Balthasar, 1938)

Synonyms
- Aphodius (Volinus) auliensis Balthasar, 1938

Species of beetle

Chilothorax auliensis is a species of beetle of the family Scarabaeidae. It is found in Kazakhstan, Kyrgyzstan and Turkmenistan.

== Description ==
Adults reach a length of about 5–5.5 mm (0.20–0.22 in). They have a shiny body, with the head and pronotum black, with the anterior margin of the former reddish and the sides of the latter yellowish-brown. The elytra are light yellowish-brown, with a darkened suture and brownish spots. The underside black and the legs are rust-red.
