= Chilothorax punctatus =

Scientific classification
- Kingdom: Animalia
- Phylum: Arthropoda
- Clade: Pancrustacea
- Class: Insecta
- Order: Coleoptera
- Suborder: Polyphaga
- Infraorder: Scarabaeiformia
- Family: Scarabaeidae
- Genus: Chilothorax
- Species: C. punctatus

Binomial name
- Chilothorax punctatus (Waterhouse, 1875)

Synonyms
- Aphodius punctatus Waterhouse, 1875; Aphodius (Volinus) obsoleteguttatus kuatunensis Balthasar, 1961

Species of beetle

Chilothorax punctatus is a species of beetle of the family Scarabaeidae. It is found in China (Fujian), Japan and Korea.

== Description ==
Adults reach a length of about 5 mm (0.20 in). They have an elongate, convex, black body. Each elytron has 10 yellowish spots on the anterior half, while the lateral margins and the apex of the elytra are reddish-brown.
