= Chilothorax variicolor =

Scientific classification
- Kingdom: Animalia
- Phylum: Arthropoda
- Clade: Pancrustacea
- Class: Insecta
- Order: Coleoptera
- Suborder: Polyphaga
- Infraorder: Scarabaeiformia
- Family: Scarabaeidae
- Genus: Chilothorax
- Species: C. variicolor

Binomial name
- Chilothorax variicolor (Koshantschikov, 1894)

Synonyms
- Aphodius (Volinus) variicolor Koshantschikov, 1894; Aphodius (Erytus) aralensis Stebnicka, 1978

Species of beetle

Chilothorax variicolor is a species of beetle of the family Scarabaeidae. It is found in Azerbaijan, Kazakhstan and Russia.

== Description ==
Adults reach a length of about 4.5–6 mm (0.18–0.24 in). They have an elongate-oval, moderately convex, shining, light reddish-brown body. The pronotum has a darker spot on each side and the elytra are often somewhat lighter yellowish-brown, with a faint dark-brown pattern and some spots.

== Life history ==
Adults have been recorded feeding on horse dung, while the larvae have been found among the roots of cheat grass.
