= Chilothorax jacobsoni =

Scientific classification
- Kingdom: Animalia
- Phylum: Arthropoda
- Clade: Pancrustacea
- Class: Insecta
- Order: Coleoptera
- Suborder: Polyphaga
- Infraorder: Scarabaeiformia
- Family: Scarabaeidae
- Genus: Chilothorax
- Species: C. jacobsoni

Binomial name
- Chilothorax jacobsoni (Koshantschikov, 1911)

Synonyms
- Aphodius (Volinus) jacobsoni Koshantschikov, 1911; Aphodius (Volinus) praenubilus Balthasar, 1933; Aphodius (Volinus) stichai Balthasar, 1933; Aphodius (Volinus) jacobsoni alexidis Koshantschikov, 1911; Aphodius (Volinus) jacobsoni georgii Koshantschikov, 1911

Species of beetle

Chilothorax jacobsoni is a species of beetle of the family Scarabaeidae. It is found in Afghanistan, China (Shanghai, Xizang), Kazakhstan, Mongolia and Siberia.

== Description ==
Adults reach a length of about 3.5–6 mm (0.14–0.24 in). They have an elongate, slender body. The head and pronotum are dark brown with lighter margins and the elytra have a darkened suture and reddish-brown spots. The sides and apex of the elytra are covered with fine hairs.
