= Chilothorax pictus =

Scientific classification
- Kingdom: Animalia
- Phylum: Arthropoda
- Clade: Pancrustacea
- Class: Insecta
- Order: Coleoptera
- Suborder: Polyphaga
- Infraorder: Scarabaeiformia
- Family: Scarabaeidae
- Genus: Chilothorax
- Species: C. pictus

Binomial name
- Chilothorax pictus (Sturm, 1805)

Synonyms
- Aphodius pictus Sturm, 1805; Aphodius (Volinus) pictus flavomaculatus Endrödi, 1955; Aphodius pictus brumalis Mulsant, 1842; Aphodius pictus flavidus Mulsant, 1842; Aphodius pictus indigens Mulsant, 1842; Aphodius pollutus Brahm, 1809; Aphodius conspurcatus inquinatus Creutzer, 1799

Species of beetle

Chilothorax pictus is a species of beetle of the family Scarabaeidae. It is found in Algeria, Austria, Belgium, Croatia, the Czech Republic, Denmark, Estonia, France, Germany, Hungary, Latvia, Lithuania, the Netherlands, Poland, Romania, Russia, Slovakia, Slovenia, Spain, Sweden, Switzerland and Ukraine.

== Description ==
Adults reach a length of about 3.5–5 mm (0.14–0.20 in). They have a strongly convex, glabrous, shining, black body, with the outer margin of the head and usually the lateral margin of the pronotum reddish. The scutellum is dark and the elytra are yellow-brown with a darkened suture and dark brown markings. The legs are reddish-brown.
