= Chilothorax bistriga =

Scientific classification
- Kingdom: Animalia
- Phylum: Arthropoda
- Clade: Pancrustacea
- Class: Insecta
- Order: Coleoptera
- Suborder: Polyphaga
- Infraorder: Scarabaeiformia
- Family: Scarabaeidae
- Genus: Chilothorax
- Species: C. bistriga

Binomial name
- Chilothorax bistriga (Reitter, 1900)

Synonyms
- Aphodius (Volinus) bistriga Reitter, 1900

Species of beetle

Chilothorax bistriga is a species of beetle of the family Scarabaeidae. It is found in China (Xizang).

== Description ==
Adults reach a length of about 3.3–3.5 mm (0.13–0.14 in). They have an elongate-oval, moderately convex, black body, with the sides of the pronotum and the elytra light brown, the latter with black markings that form two bands.
