= Chilothorax shansianus =

Scientific classification
- Kingdom: Animalia
- Phylum: Arthropoda
- Clade: Pancrustacea
- Class: Insecta
- Order: Coleoptera
- Suborder: Polyphaga
- Infraorder: Scarabaeiformia
- Family: Scarabaeidae
- Genus: Chilothorax
- Species: C. shansianus

Binomial name
- Chilothorax shansianus (Nakane & Shirahata, 1957)

Synonyms
- Aphodius (Chilothorax) shansianus Nakane & Shirahata, 1957

Species of beetle

Chilothorax shansianus is a species of beetle of the family Scarabaeidae. It is found in China (Shanxi).

== Description ==
Adults reach a length of about 3–3.5 mm (0.12–0.14 in). They have an elongate-oval body, with the anterior part of the body moderately shiny, while the elytra are dull. The head is light brown with lighter margins and the pronotum and scutellum are blackish-brown, the former with yellow lateral edges. The elytra are yellowish-brown with a blackened suture and blackish-brown spots.
