= Chilothorax hahni =

Scientific classification
- Kingdom: Animalia
- Phylum: Arthropoda
- Clade: Pancrustacea
- Class: Insecta
- Order: Coleoptera
- Suborder: Polyphaga
- Infraorder: Scarabaeiformia
- Family: Scarabaeidae
- Genus: Chilothorax
- Species: C. hahni

Binomial name
- Chilothorax hahni (Reitter, 1907)

Synonyms
- Aphodius (Volinus) hahni Reitter, 1907

Species of beetle

Chilothorax hahni is a species of beetle of the family Scarabaeidae. It is found in Kazakhstan and Russia.

== Description ==
Adults reach a length of about 5–5.5 mm (0.20–0.22 in). They have a strongly convex, glossy, black body. The scutellum is dark and the elytra are dark yellowish-red, with a somewhat darkened suture and dark spots, as well as a short transverse band, a lateral longitudinal band and a transverse band. The legs are light reddish-brown.
