= Chilothorax okadai =

Scientific classification
- Kingdom: Animalia
- Phylum: Arthropoda
- Clade: Pancrustacea
- Class: Insecta
- Order: Coleoptera
- Suborder: Polyphaga
- Infraorder: Scarabaeiformia
- Family: Scarabaeidae
- Genus: Chilothorax
- Species: C. okadai

Binomial name
- Chilothorax okadai (Nakane, 1951)

Synonyms
- Aphodius (Volinus) okadai Nakane, 1951; Aphodius okadai kiritachiensis Ochi, Kawahara & Ohshio, 2012

Species of beetle

Chilothorax okadai is a species of beetle of the family Scarabaeidae. It is found in Japan (Honshū, Kyushu).

== Description ==
Adults reach a length of about 5 mm (0.20 in). They have a moderately glossy, black body, with the head and the lateral margin of the pronotum reddish-brown. The elytra have big dark markings, adorned with yellowish-brown spots. The legs are reddish-brown.

== Subspecies ==
- Chilothorax okadai okadai (Japan: Honshū)
- Chilothorax okadai kiritachiensis (Ochi, Kawahara & Ohshio, 2012) (Japan: Kyushu)
