= Chilothorax kukunorensis =

Scientific classification
- Kingdom: Animalia
- Phylum: Arthropoda
- Clade: Pancrustacea
- Class: Insecta
- Order: Coleoptera
- Suborder: Polyphaga
- Infraorder: Scarabaeiformia
- Family: Scarabaeidae
- Genus: Chilothorax
- Species: C. kukunorensis

Binomial name
- Chilothorax kukunorensis (Semenov, 1898)

Synonyms
- Aphodius (Volinus) kukunorensis Semenov, 1898; Aphodius kukunorensis adumbratus Koshantschikov, 1912; Aphodius kukunorensis petiolatus Koshantschikov, 1912

Species of beetle

Chilothorax kukunorensis is a species of beetle of the family Scarabaeidae. It is found in China (Qinghai, Xizang).

== Description ==
Adults reach a length of about 6–6.5 mm (0.24–0.26 in). They have a stout, strongly convex, black body, with the pronotum reddish-yellow. The elytra are light yellowish-brown, with a blackened sutural interval and two black, longitudinal stripes. The legs are dark brown.
