= Chilothorax grafi =

Scientific classification
- Kingdom: Animalia
- Phylum: Arthropoda
- Clade: Pancrustacea
- Class: Insecta
- Order: Coleoptera
- Suborder: Polyphaga
- Infraorder: Scarabaeiformia
- Family: Scarabaeidae
- Genus: Chilothorax
- Species: C. grafi

Binomial name
- Chilothorax grafi (Reitter, 1901)

Synonyms
- Aphodius (Volinus) grafi Reitter, 1901; Aphodius (Nobius) boreomongolicus Nikolajev, 1984; Aphodius (Melinopterus) kryzhanovskii Nikritin, 1969; Aphodius (Volinus) schutovae Nikritin, 1969; Aphodius (Volinus) grafi grafianus Reitter, 1901; Aphodius (Volinus) grafi heinrichi Reitter, 1901

Species of beetle

Chilothorax grafi is a species of beetle of the family Scarabaeidae. It is found in Mongolia, the Russian Far East and Siberia.

== Description ==
Adults reach a length of about 4.5–5.5 mm (0.18–0.22 in). They have a rather slender, shining, glabrous body. The head and pronotum are blackish-brown, with the front of the head translucent reddish, and the pronotum with yellow margins. The elytra are light brownish-yellow with a darkened sutural edge.
