= Chilothorax fritschi =

Scientific classification
- Kingdom: Animalia
- Phylum: Arthropoda
- Clade: Pancrustacea
- Class: Insecta
- Order: Coleoptera
- Suborder: Polyphaga
- Infraorder: Scarabaeiformia
- Family: Scarabaeidae
- Genus: Chilothorax
- Species: C. fritschi

Binomial name
- Chilothorax fritschi (Balthasar, 1933)

Synonyms
- Aphodius (Volinus) fritschi Balthasar, 1933; Aphodius (Volinus) fritschi discrepitus Balthasar, 1933

Species of beetle

Chilothorax fritschi is a species of beetle of the family Scarabaeidae. It is found in Iran, Iraq, Israel and Jordan.

== Description ==
Adults reach a length of about 5 mm (0.20 in). They have a fairly parallel-sided, smooth, shiny, black body. The pronotum is reddish and translucent along the sides, while the elytra are yellowish-brown with a dark sutural interval and dark brown markings. The legs are light brown.
