= Chilothorax longetarsalis =

Scientific classification
- Kingdom: Animalia
- Phylum: Arthropoda
- Clade: Pancrustacea
- Class: Insecta
- Order: Coleoptera
- Suborder: Polyphaga
- Infraorder: Scarabaeiformia
- Family: Scarabaeidae
- Genus: Chilothorax
- Species: C. longetarsalis

Binomial name
- Chilothorax longetarsalis (Pittino, 1988)

Synonyms
- Aphodius (Mendidaphodius) longetarsalis Pittino, 1988

Species of beetle

Chilothorax longetarsalis is a species of beetle of the family Scarabaeidae. It is found in Algeria.

== Description ==
Adults reach a length of about 3.5–4.5 mm (0.14–0.18 in). They have an oval-elongate, moderately convex, shiny, glabrous body. The head and pronotum are brownish, the latter with testaceous margins. The elytra are pale yellowish with brown-reddish suture and spots. The legs are yellowish, the antennal club is testaceous and the underside is dark brown-reddish.

== Life history ==
Specimens have been collected in plant debris among grass roots in an arid desert steppe area.
