= Chilothorax figuratus =

Scientific classification
- Kingdom: Animalia
- Phylum: Arthropoda
- Clade: Pancrustacea
- Class: Insecta
- Order: Coleoptera
- Suborder: Polyphaga
- Infraorder: Scarabaeiformia
- Family: Scarabaeidae
- Genus: Chilothorax
- Species: C. figuratus

Binomial name
- Chilothorax figuratus (Schmidt, 1906)

Synonyms
- Aphodius (Volinus) figuratus Schmidt, 1906; Aphodius figuratus ambitiosus Schmidt, 1917

Species of beetle

Chilothorax figuratus is a species of beetle of the family Scarabaeidae. It is found in Kyrgyzstan and Tajikistan.

== Description ==
Adults reach a length of about 3.5–4 mm (0.14–0.16 in). They have a moderately convex, glossy, glabrous, black body, the pronotum with light front edges. The elytra are yellowish-brown with dark markings.
