= Chilothorax chandmanicus =

Scientific classification
- Kingdom: Animalia
- Phylum: Arthropoda
- Clade: Pancrustacea
- Class: Insecta
- Order: Coleoptera
- Suborder: Polyphaga
- Infraorder: Scarabaeiformia
- Family: Scarabaeidae
- Genus: Chilothorax
- Species: C. chandmanicus

Binomial name
- Chilothorax chandmanicus (Frolov, 2001)

Synonyms
- Aphodius (Chilothorax) chandmanicus Frolov, 2001

Species of beetle

Chilothorax chandmanicus is a species of beetle of the family Scarabaeidae. It is found in Mongolia.

== Description ==
Adults reach a length of about 6.4–6.7 mm (0.25–0.26 in). The head is brown and shiny and the pronotum is also brown and shiny, but light brownish on the sides. The elytra are light yellowish-brown and shiny, with longitudinal brown spots.

== Etymology ==
The name of the species is derived from the type locality, Chandman.
