= Chilothorax alexis =

Scientific classification
- Kingdom: Animalia
- Phylum: Arthropoda
- Clade: Pancrustacea
- Class: Insecta
- Order: Coleoptera
- Suborder: Polyphaga
- Infraorder: Scarabaeiformia
- Family: Scarabaeidae
- Genus: Chilothorax
- Species: C. alexis

Binomial name
- Chilothorax alexis (Frolov, 2001)

Synonyms
- Aphodius (Chilothorax) alexis Frolov, 2001

Species of beetle

Chilothorax alexis is a species of beetle of the family Scarabaeidae. It is found in Mongolia.

== Description ==
Adults reach a length of about 4.6–5.5 mm (0.18–0.22 in). The head and pronotum are brown and shiny, the latter with light brownish sides and with sparse hairs along the lateral margins. The elytra are light brown and shiny with brown spots and with the sides and apices covered with short hairs.
