= Chilothorax naevuliger =

Scientific classification
- Kingdom: Animalia
- Phylum: Arthropoda
- Clade: Pancrustacea
- Class: Insecta
- Order: Coleoptera
- Suborder: Polyphaga
- Infraorder: Scarabaeiformia
- Family: Scarabaeidae
- Genus: Chilothorax
- Species: C. naevuliger

Binomial name
- Chilothorax naevuliger (Reitter, 1894)

Synonyms
- Aphodius (Volinus) naevuliger Reitter, 1894

Species of beetle

Chilothorax naevuliger is a species of beetle of the family Scarabaeidae. It is found in Algeria, Morocco and Tunisia.

== Description ==
Adults reach a length of about 4.5–5.5 mm (0.18–0.22 in). They have a strongly convex, oblong-oval, glossy, black body, with the sides of the pronotum yellowish-brown. The scutellum is dark and the elytra are yellowish-brown with a darkened suture and a highly variable blackish-brown pattern. The legs are reddish-brown.
