= Chilothorax exclamationis =

Scientific classification
- Kingdom: Animalia
- Phylum: Arthropoda
- Clade: Pancrustacea
- Class: Insecta
- Order: Coleoptera
- Suborder: Polyphaga
- Infraorder: Scarabaeiformia
- Family: Scarabaeidae
- Genus: Chilothorax
- Species: C. exclamationis

Binomial name
- Chilothorax exclamationis (Motschulsky, 1849)

Synonyms
- Aphodius exclamationis Motschulsky, 1849; Aphodius (Volinus) exclamationis capbonensis Balthasar, 1964

Species of beetle

Chilothorax exclamationis is a species of beetle of the family Scarabaeidae. It is found in Morocco, Algeria, Libya, Spain and Tunisia.

== Description ==
Adults reach a length of about 3.5–4.5 mm (0.14–0.18 in). They have an oblong, convex, shiny, almost glabrous body. The head is blackish with the margin of the clypeus reddish. The pronotum is black, with yellowish sides. The scutellum is blackish and the elytra are pale yellowish with blackish suture and a blackish stripe, as well as a blackish preapical spot. The legs are brownish-red and the antennal club is piceous.
