= Chilothorax comma =

Scientific classification
- Kingdom: Animalia
- Phylum: Arthropoda
- Clade: Pancrustacea
- Class: Insecta
- Order: Coleoptera
- Suborder: Polyphaga
- Infraorder: Scarabaeiformia
- Family: Scarabaeidae
- Genus: Chilothorax
- Species: C. comma

Binomial name
- Chilothorax comma (Reitter, 1892)

Synonyms
- Aphodius (Volinus) comma Reitter, 1892; Aphodius (Melinopterus) comma incomma Reitter, 1906

Species of beetle

Chilothorax comma is a species of beetle of the family Scarabaeidae. It is found in China (Xizang), Kazakhstan, Mongolia and Russia, including the Russian Far East and Siberia.

== Description ==
Adults reach a length of about 3.2–4 mm (0.13–0.16 in). They have a slender, shiny, glabrous body. The head and pronotum are black, the latter with yellow sides. The scutellum is brown and the elytra are pale yellow with a darkened suture.
