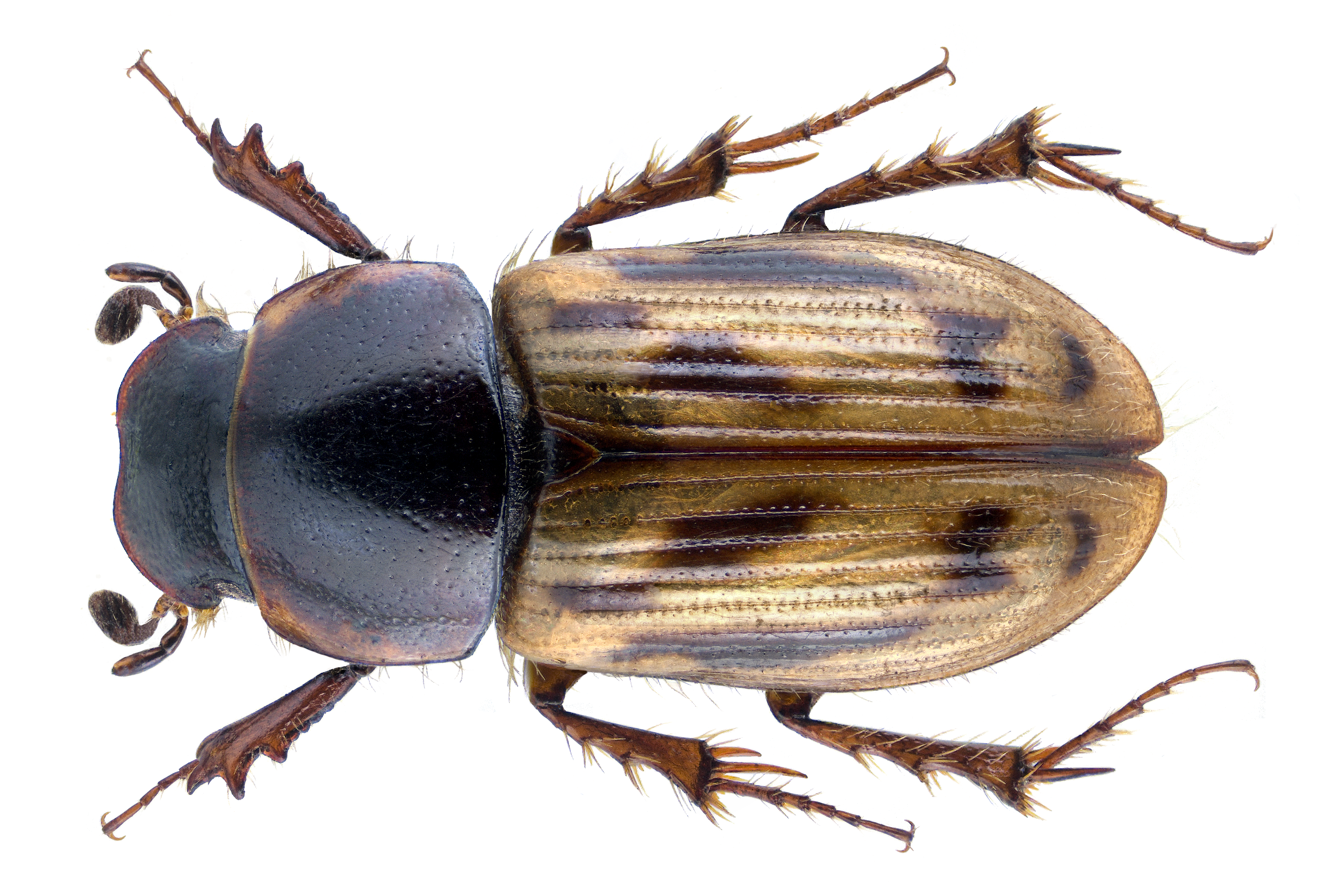
- Chilothorax albosetosus

Scientific classification
- Kingdom: Animalia
- Phylum: Arthropoda
- Clade: Pancrustacea
- Class: Insecta
- Order: Coleoptera
- Suborder: Polyphaga
- Infraorder: Scarabaeiformia
- Family: Scarabaeidae
- Subfamily: Aphodiinae
- Tribe: Aphodiini
- Genus: Chilothorax; Motschulsky, 1859

Synonyms
- Aphodius (Dimendius) Olsoufieff, 1929

= Chilothorax =

Genus of beetles

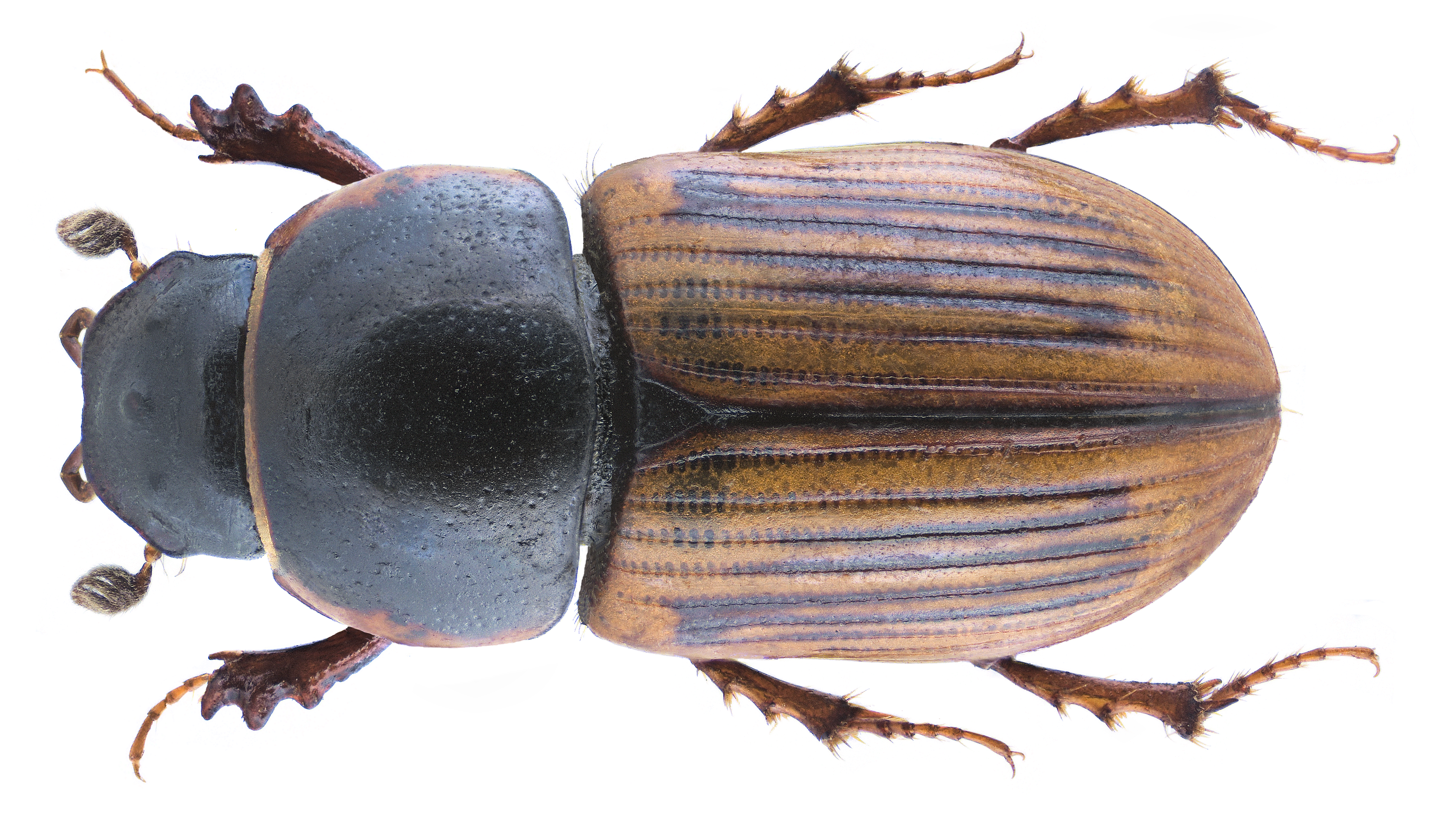
Chilothorax lineolatus

Chilothorax is a genus of scarab beetles in the family Scarabaeidae. There are more than 60 described species in Chilothorax, found in Europe, Asia, Africa, and North America.

Many of these species have been transferred from the genus Aphodius.

== Species ==
These 66 species belong to the genus Chilothorax:

- Chilothorax albosetosus (Pittino, 1995)
- Chilothorax alexis (Frolov, 2001)
- Chilothorax aljibei (Blanco, 1986)
- Chilothorax altaicus (Nikolajev, 1984)
- Chilothorax auliensis (Balthasar, 1938)
- Chilothorax badenkoi (Nikolajev, 1987)
- Chilothorax bistriga (Reitter, 1900)
- Chilothorax brancoi (Baraud, 1981)
- Chilothorax cervorum (Fairmaire, 1871)
- Chilothorax chandmanicus (Frolov, 2001)
- Chilothorax clathratus (Reitter, 1892)
- Chilothorax clausula (Koshantschikov, 1910)
- Chilothorax comma (Reitter, 1892)
- Chilothorax conspurcatus (Linnaeus, 1758)
- Chilothorax discedens (Schmidt, 1907)
- Chilothorax distinctus (Müller, 1776)
- Chilothorax dobrovljanskyi (Koshantschikov, 1913)
- Chilothorax dzongensis (Petrovitz, 1976)
- Chilothorax equitis (Koshantschikov, 1912)
- Chilothorax exclamationis (Motschulsky, 1849)
- Chilothorax exilimanus (Kabakov, 1996)
- Chilothorax figuratus (Schmidt, 1906)
- Chilothorax flammulatus (Harold, 1876)
- Chilothorax flavimargo (Reitter, 1901)
- Chilothorax fritschi (Balthasar, 1933)
- Chilothorax glebi (Frolov, 2006)
- Chilothorax grafi (Reitter, 1901)
- Chilothorax hahni (Reitter, 1907)
- Chilothorax hieroglyphicus (Klug, 1845)
- Chilothorax hozuensis Ochi, Tsukamoto & Kawahara, 2015
- Chilothorax huangyuanensis (Červenka, 1994)
- Chilothorax hucklesbyi (Paulian, 1942)
- Chilothorax ivanovi (Lebedev, 1911)
- Chilothorax jacobsoni (Koshantschikov, 1911)
- Chilothorax kandaharicus (Balthasar, 1961)
- Chilothorax kardonensis (Huang & Du, 1999)
- Chilothorax kerzhneri (Nikolajev, 1984)
- Chilothorax kukunorensis (Semenov, 1898)
- Chilothorax lieni (Masumoto, Kiuchi & Wang, 2014)
- Chilothorax lineolatus (Illiger, 1803)
- Chilothorax logunovi (Zinchenko, 2003)
- Chilothorax longetarsalis (Pittino, 1988)
- Chilothorax melanostictus (Schmidt, 1840)
- Chilothorax mongolaltaicus (Nikolajev, 1984)
- Chilothorax mossulensis (Mulsant & Godart, 1879)
- Chilothorax naevuliger (Reitter, 1894)
- Chilothorax nigrivittis (Solsky, 1876)
- Chilothorax ohishii (Masumoto, 1975)
- Chilothorax okadai (Nakane, 1951)
- Chilothorax pamirensis (Medvedev, 1928)
- Chilothorax paykulli (Bedel, 1907)
- Chilothorax pictus (Sturm, 1805)
- Chilothorax planus (Koshantschikov, 1894)
- Chilothorax potanini (Frolov, 2001)
- Chilothorax propola (Balthasar, 1946)
- Chilothorax punctatus (Waterhouse, 1875)
- Chilothorax sexmaculosus (Schmidt, 1911)
- Chilothorax shansianus (Nakane & Shirahata, 1957)
- Chilothorax sinicus (Červenka, 1994)
- Chilothorax subpolitus Motschulsky, 1860
- Chilothorax tanhensis (Frolov, 2001)
- Chilothorax tenuimanus (Sharp, 1878)
- Chilothorax variicolor (Koshantschikov, 1894)
- Chilothorax variipennis (Schmidt, 1916)
- Chilothorax xanthellus (Frolov, 2002)
- Chilothorax zaissanicus (Nikolajev, 1987)
