= Chilothorax nigrivittis =

Scientific classification
- Kingdom: Animalia
- Phylum: Arthropoda
- Clade: Pancrustacea
- Class: Insecta
- Order: Coleoptera
- Suborder: Polyphaga
- Infraorder: Scarabaeiformia
- Family: Scarabaeidae
- Genus: Chilothorax
- Species: C. nigrivittis

Binomial name
- Chilothorax nigrivittis (Solsky, 1876)

Synonyms
- Aphodius nigrivittis Solsky, 1876; Aphodius (Volinus) grafi reitterellus Koshantschikov, 1911; Aphodius (Volinus) obliquatus Reitter, 1892

Species of beetle

Chilothorax nigrivittis is a species of beetle of the family Scarabaeidae. It is found in Afghanistan, Kazakhstan, Kyrgyzstan, Mongolia, Tajikistan, Turkmenistan and China (Xinjiang).

== Description ==
Adults reach a length of about 5–6 mm (0.20–0.24 in). They have a strongly convex, shiny, glabrous, black body, with the head reddish-translucent at the front. The pronotum is yellowish-red, the scutellum is dark and the elytra have a darkened suture and a blackish-brown pattern. The legs are dark reddish-brown.

== Subspecies ==
- Chilothorax nigrivittis nigrivittis (Afghanistan, Kazakhstan, Kyrgyzstan, Mongolia, Tajikistan, Turkmenistan, China: Xinjiang)
- Chilothorax nigrivittis impubis Koshantschikov, 1913 (Mongolia)
- Chilothorax nigrivittis kongurensis Ochi, Tsukamoto & Kawahara, 2015 (China: Xinjiang)
