= Vladimír Balthasar =

Czech naturalist and entomologist

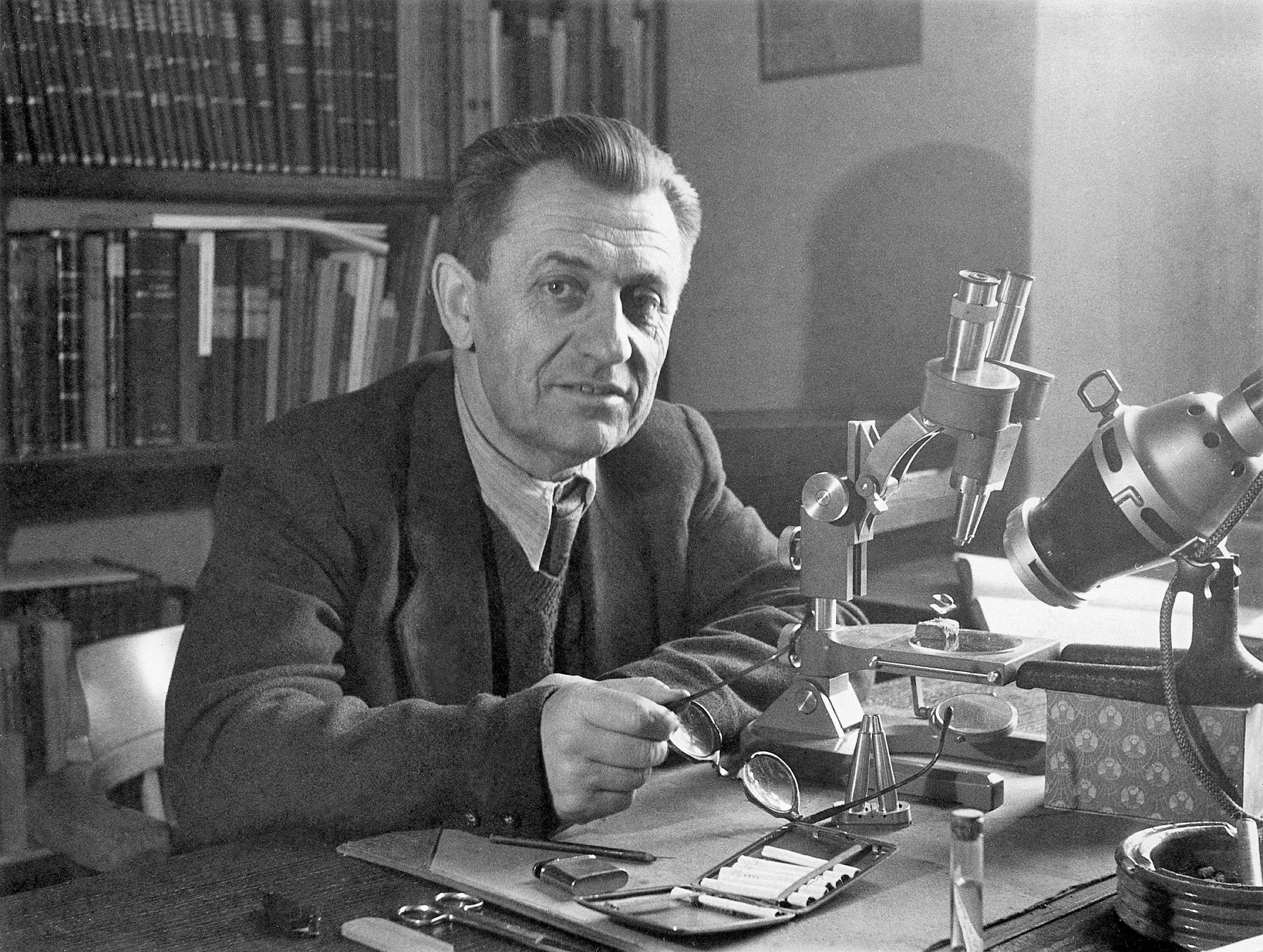
- Balthasar in 1952
- Born: 21 June 1897; Prague, Kingdom of Bohemia, Austria-Hungary
- Died: 10 November 1978 (aged 81); Prague, Czechoslovakia
- Occupations: Naturalist, entomologist, journalist, musicologist, art historian

Vladimír Balthasar (21 June 1897 – 10 November 1978) was a Czech naturalist and entomologist, also active as a journalist, musicologist and art historian. His scientific work included Coleoptera, Heteroptera and Hymenoptera, and he published more than 200 scientific papers and ten books.

== Life and work ==
Balthasar studied aesthetics, music history and art history at Charles University in Prague from 1917 to 1920, zoology from 1926 to 1929, and medicine externally at Comenius University in Bratislava from 1935 to 1939. During the 1920s he worked as a journalist and editor, and also published on music and art history.

In 1933, he became custodian of the zoological-botanical department of the Slovak Homeland Museum in Bratislava. He studied the Slovak entomofauna until leaving Slovakia in 1938, publishing work on beetles, true bugs and hymenopterans from Slovak localities and Subcarpathian Ruthenia. In 1938, he was elected a member of the Učená společnost Šafaříkova for his scientific and museum work.

From 1938 to 1947, Balthasar directed the biological department of the Natural Science Study Institute of the Baťa Works in Zlín, where he helped establish a natural history museum and studied the entomofauna of Moravia. From 1947 he worked at the biological institute of the medical faculty in Hradec Králové, and from 1951 to 1957 he was director of the natural history department of the Regional Museum in Hradec Králové. After retiring in 1957, he returned to Prague and continued entomological work.

Balthasar was especially associated with the study of scarab beetles. The University of Nebraska State Museum's Scarab Workers World Directory describes him as a prolific worker on Scarabaeinae and Aphodiinae and identifies his three-volume Monographie der Scarabaeidae und Aphodiidae der Palaearktischen und Orientalischen Region, published in 1963–1964, as his major work.

The Senckenberg German Entomological Institute lists his specialisms as Coleoptera and Hymenoptera, and records parts of his collections as held by the National Museum in Prague, the Hungarian Natural History Museum in Budapest, Museum Frey in Tutzing, and the Regional Museum in Hradec Králové.
