= Frankenberg =

Frankenberg may refer to:

== Places ==
- Frankenberg, Hesse, a town in Hesse, Germany
- Frankenberg, Saxony, a town in Saxony, Germany
- Waldeck-Frankenberg, a district in Hesse, Germany

== Persons ==
- Frankenberg family, an ancient noble family from Silesia
  - Abraham von Franckenberg, German-Silesian Lutheran mystic, poet and hymn-writer
  - Friedrich von Frankenberg, Australian-German mystic and early founder of Sufism in Australia
  - Cardinal Joannes-Henricus de Franckenberg, German-Silesian Roman Catholic Archbishop of Mechelen, Primate of the Low Countries and cardinal
  - Richard von Frankenberg, German-Silesian journalist and race-car driver
- Ronald Frankenberg, British anthropologist
- Ruth Frankenberg, British sociologist and Ronald Frankenberg's daughter
