= Jozef Florián Babor =

Slovak zoologist and physician

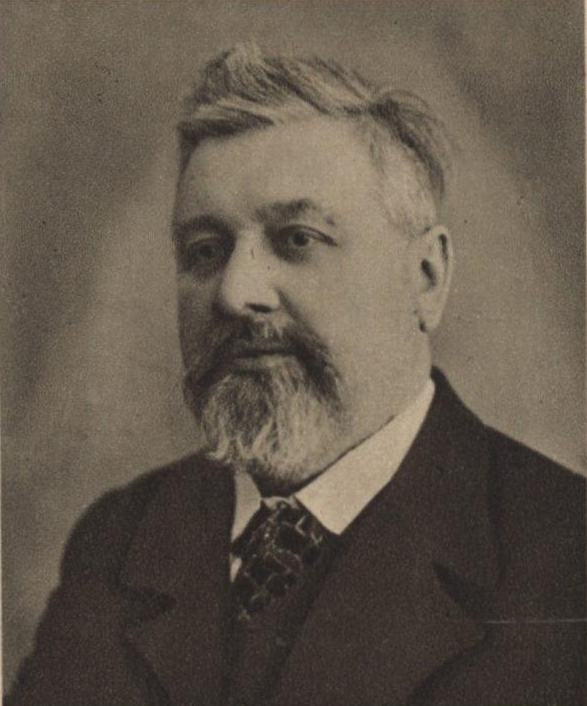

Josef Florián Babor (4 May 1872 – 11 January 1951) was a Czech-Slovak physician and zoologist. He served at the Charles University, where he took a special interest in molluscs, describing a number of new species. He was also involved in anthropology and attempted to find a common ground for biology and Christianity. He was the brother of Márie Zdenka Baborová-Čiháková (1877–1937).

== Life and work ==
Babor was born in Prague where his father was a school headmaster. A younger sister Márie Zdenka Baborová-Čiháková (1877–1937) became a zoologist. After studies at grammar school he joined Charles University in Prague and became a medical doctor in 1897. He also attended natural sciences lectures by Antonín Frič, Jan Palacký and František Vejdovský. He practiced from 1899 to 1915 at Prague and served as a military doctor in Bohemia during World War I. He moved to Slovakia in 1919 and taught at the Comenius University in Bratislava. He became a professor in 1928 and headed the biology department at the faculty of medicine until 1943. He studied both living and fossil molluscs, examined the function of Semper's organ, the effect of X-ray and ultraviolet irradiation on molluscs. He also took an interest in human evolution and wrote popular science articles. He sought to find common ground between theology and science. He was against allowing abortion and supported the Catholic church.
