= Aganocrossus periculosus =

Scientific classification
- Kingdom: Animalia
- Phylum: Arthropoda
- Clade: Pancrustacea
- Class: Insecta
- Order: Coleoptera
- Suborder: Polyphaga
- Infraorder: Scarabaeiformia
- Family: Scarabaeidae
- Genus: Aganocrossus
- Species: A. periculosus

Binomial name
- Aganocrossus periculosus (Bordat, 1992)

Synonyms
- Aphodius (Aganocrossus) periculosus Bordat, 1992

Species of beetle

Aganocrossus periculosus is a species of beetle of the family Scarabaeidae. It is found in Botswana and South Africa (Free State, Transvaal).

== Description ==
Adults reach a length of about 4.3–5.5 mm (0.17–0.22 in). They are very similar to Aganocrossus amoenus. They have the same colour, but the distribution of the hairs on the elytra is different.
