= Aganocrossus paraciprianii =

Scientific classification
- Kingdom: Animalia
- Phylum: Arthropoda
- Clade: Pancrustacea
- Class: Insecta
- Order: Coleoptera
- Suborder: Polyphaga
- Infraorder: Scarabaeiformia
- Family: Scarabaeidae
- Genus: Aganocrossus
- Species: A. paraciprianii

Binomial name
- Aganocrossus paraciprianii Bordat, 2008

Species of beetle

Aganocrossus paraciprianii is a species of beetle of the family Scarabaeidae. It is found in Tanzania.

== Description ==
Adults reach a length of about 4–4.3 mm (0.16–0.17 in). They are glossy brownish-black, with the sides of the head, the lateral margins of the pronotum and sometimes also the elytra with a reddish-brown translucency. The apical region of the elytra has erect hairs. The legs are dark reddish-brown.

== Etymology ==
The name of the species refers to its similarity to Aganocrossus ciprianii.
