= Aganocrossus pseudourostigma =

Scientific classification
- Kingdom: Animalia
- Phylum: Arthropoda
- Clade: Pancrustacea
- Class: Insecta
- Order: Coleoptera
- Suborder: Polyphaga
- Infraorder: Scarabaeiformia
- Family: Scarabaeidae
- Genus: Aganocrossus
- Species: A. pseudourostigma

Binomial name
- Aganocrossus pseudourostigma (Balthasar, 1939)

Synonyms
- Aphodius (Aganocrossus) pseudourostigma Balthasar, 1939

Species of beetle

Aganocrossus pseudourostigma is a species of beetle of the family Scarabaeidae. It is found in Ethiopia, Kenya, Senegal, Somalia, Uganda and Tanzania.

== Description ==
Adults reach a length of about 4.7–5.5 mm (0.19–0.22 in). The head and pronotum are dark brown, with the margins of the clypeus and the lateral margins of the pronotum translucent reddish-brown.
