= Aganocrossus albertisi =

Scientific classification
- Kingdom: Animalia
- Phylum: Arthropoda
- Clade: Pancrustacea
- Class: Insecta
- Order: Coleoptera
- Suborder: Polyphaga
- Infraorder: Scarabaeiformia
- Family: Scarabaeidae
- Genus: Aganocrossus
- Species: A. albertisi

Binomial name
- Aganocrossus albertisi (Harold, 1877)

Synonyms
- Aphodius albertisi Harold, 1877

Species of beetle

Aganocrossus albertisi is a species of beetle of the family Scarabaeidae. It is found in Australia (Northern Territory, Queensland) and in Papua New Guinea.

== Description ==
Adults reach a length of about 3–4.5 mm (0.12–0.18 in). They have an elongate oval, slightly shining, orange-brown to brown body.
