= Aganocrossus hirtus =

Scientific classification
- Kingdom: Animalia
- Phylum: Arthropoda
- Clade: Pancrustacea
- Class: Insecta
- Order: Coleoptera
- Suborder: Polyphaga
- Infraorder: Scarabaeiformia
- Family: Scarabaeidae
- Genus: Aganocrossus
- Species: A. hirtus

Binomial name
- Aganocrossus hirtus (Bordat, 1992)

Synonyms
- Aphodius (Aganocrossus) hirtus Bordat, 1992

Species of beetle

Aganocrossus hirtus is a species of beetle of the family Scarabaeidae. It is found in Tanzania.

== Description ==
Adults reach a length of about 3.2–3.4 mm (0.13–0.13 in). They have a convex, glossy, dark brown to brownish-black body, with the front of the head and the anterior angles of the pronotum reddish and translucent. The elytra are covered in long, erect pubescence. The legs are yellowish-brown.
