= Aganocrossus meticulosus =

Scientific classification
- Kingdom: Animalia
- Phylum: Arthropoda
- Clade: Pancrustacea
- Class: Insecta
- Order: Coleoptera
- Suborder: Polyphaga
- Infraorder: Scarabaeiformia
- Family: Scarabaeidae
- Genus: Aganocrossus
- Species: A. meticulosus

Binomial name
- Aganocrossus meticulosus Paulian, 1942

Species of beetle

Aganocrossus meticulosus is a species of beetle of the family Scarabaeidae. It is found in Kenya, the Democratic Republic of the Congo and Tanzania.

== Description ==
Adults reach a length of about 5.5–6 mm (0.22–0.24 in). The head and pronotum are brownish-black, with the margins of the clypeus and the lateral margins of the pronotum translucent light to dark brownish-red. The elytra are brownish-red.
