= Aganocrossus plicatus =

Scientific classification
- Kingdom: Animalia
- Phylum: Arthropoda
- Clade: Pancrustacea
- Class: Insecta
- Order: Coleoptera
- Suborder: Polyphaga
- Infraorder: Scarabaeiformia
- Family: Scarabaeidae
- Genus: Aganocrossus
- Species: A. plicatus

Binomial name
- Aganocrossus plicatus (Endrödi, 1964)

Synonyms
- Aphodius (Aganocrossus) plicatus Endrödi, 1964

Species of beetle

Aganocrossus plicatus is a species of beetle of the family Scarabaeidae. It is found in Gabon, the Democratic Republic of the Congo and the Republic of the Congo.

== Description ==
Adults reach a length of about 5.3–6 mm (0.21–0.24 in). They have an entirely reddish-brown, smooth and shiny body, except for the dull apex of the elytra.
