= Aganocrossus borneensis =

Scientific classification
- Kingdom: Animalia
- Phylum: Arthropoda
- Clade: Pancrustacea
- Class: Insecta
- Order: Coleoptera
- Suborder: Polyphaga
- Infraorder: Scarabaeiformia
- Family: Scarabaeidae
- Genus: Aganocrossus
- Species: A. borneensis

Binomial name
- Aganocrossus borneensis Petrovitz, 1962

Species of beetle

Aganocrossus borneensis is a species of beetle of the family Scarabaeidae. It is found on Borneo.

== Description ==
Adults reach a length of about 5.2 mm (0.20 in). They have a light chestnut-brown body, with the disc of the pronotum somewhat darker. They are shiny, and the sides and tips of the elytra have erect hairs.
