= Aganocrossus newmanae =

Scientific classification
- Kingdom: Animalia
- Phylum: Arthropoda
- Clade: Pancrustacea
- Class: Insecta
- Order: Coleoptera
- Suborder: Polyphaga
- Infraorder: Scarabaeiformia
- Family: Scarabaeidae
- Genus: Aganocrossus
- Species: A. newmanae

Binomial name
- Aganocrossus newmanae Bordat, 2008

Species of beetle

Aganocrossus newmanae is a species of beetle of the family Scarabaeidae. It is found in Cameroon and Ivory Coast.

== Description ==
Adults reach a length of about 3.8–4.4 mm (0.15–0.17 in). They are glossy, dark reddish-brown, with the margin of the clypeus, the lateral margins of the pronotum and the apex of the elytra lighter. Both the elytra and the lateral margins of the pronotum are pubescent. The legs are reddish-brown.

== Etymology ==
The species is named in honour of Dr. Dorothy Newman.
