= Aganocrossus clementianus =

Scientific classification
- Kingdom: Animalia
- Phylum: Arthropoda
- Clade: Pancrustacea
- Class: Insecta
- Order: Coleoptera
- Suborder: Polyphaga
- Infraorder: Scarabaeiformia
- Family: Scarabaeidae
- Genus: Aganocrossus
- Species: A. clementianus

Binomial name
- Aganocrossus clementianus (Endrödi, 1964)

Synonyms
- Aphodius (Aganocrossus) clementianus Endrödi, 1964

Species of beetle

Aganocrossus clementianus is a species of beetle of the family Scarabaeidae. It is found in Guinea.

== Description ==
Adults reach a length of about 4.3–4.7 mm (0.17–0.19 in). They have a dark brown body.
