= Aganocrossus fugitivus =

Scientific classification
- Kingdom: Animalia
- Phylum: Arthropoda
- Clade: Pancrustacea
- Class: Insecta
- Order: Coleoptera
- Suborder: Polyphaga
- Infraorder: Scarabaeiformia
- Family: Scarabaeidae
- Genus: Aganocrossus
- Species: A. fugitivus

Binomial name
- Aganocrossus fugitivus (Péringuey, 1901)

Synonyms
- Aphodius fugitivus Péringuey, 1901; Aphodius (Aganocrossus) zebrinus Petrovitz, 1958

Species of beetle

Aganocrossus fugitivus is a species of beetle of the family Scarabaeidae. It is found in South Africa and Lesotho.

== Description ==
Adults reach a length of about 5–5.8 mm (0.20–0.23 in). The head and pronotum are dark brown, with the anterior part of the clypeus and the lateral margins of the pronotum reddish-brown. The elytra are brownish-yellow, with darker intervals and brownish-black striae.
