= Aganocrossus tacitus =

Scientific classification
- Kingdom: Animalia
- Phylum: Arthropoda
- Clade: Pancrustacea
- Class: Insecta
- Order: Coleoptera
- Suborder: Polyphaga
- Infraorder: Scarabaeiformia
- Family: Scarabaeidae
- Genus: Aganocrossus
- Species: A. tacitus

Binomial name
- Aganocrossus tacitus Bordat, 2008

Species of beetle

Aganocrossus tacitus is a species of beetle of the family Scarabaeidae. It is found in Kenya.

== Description ==
Adults reach a length of about 3.4–4.1 mm (0.13–0.16 in). They are glossy brownish-black, with the sides of the head, the lateral margins of the pronotum, and sometimes the scutellar region reddish. The elytra is partially covered with light-colored, erect setae. The legs are dark reddish-brown.
