= Aganocrossus pseudamoenus =

Scientific classification
- Kingdom: Animalia
- Phylum: Arthropoda
- Clade: Pancrustacea
- Class: Insecta
- Order: Coleoptera
- Suborder: Polyphaga
- Infraorder: Scarabaeiformia
- Family: Scarabaeidae
- Genus: Aganocrossus
- Species: A. pseudamoenus

Binomial name
- Aganocrossus pseudamoenus (Müller, 1941)

Synonyms
- Aphodius (Aganocrossus) pseudamoenus Müller, 1941

Species of beetle

Aganocrossus pseudamoenus is a species of beetle of the family Scarabaeidae. It is found in Ethiopia and Somalia.

== Description ==
Adults reach a length of about 5–5.5 mm (0.20–0.22 in). The head and pronotum are brown, with the sides of the head and the lateral margins of the pronotum lighter. The elytra are with some dark brown areas and spots.
