= Aganocrossus =

- Aganocrossus vestitus

Scientific classification
- Kingdom: Animalia
- Phylum: Arthropoda
- Clade: Pancrustacea
- Class: Insecta
- Order: Coleoptera
- Suborder: Polyphaga
- Infraorder: Scarabaeiformia
- Family: Scarabaeidae
- Subfamily: Aphodiinae
- Tribe: Aphodiini
- Genus: Aganocrossus; Reitter, 1895

Synonyms
- Aphodius (Aganocrossus) Reitter, 1895

Genus of beetles

Aganocrossus is a genus of beetles of the family Scarabaeidae.

== Species ==
- Aganocrossus albertisi (Harold, 1877)
- Aganocrossus amoenus (Boheman, 1857)
- Aganocrossus apicenotatus (Müller, 1941)
- Aganocrossus bordatianus (Masumoto & Kiuchi, 2003)
- Aganocrossus borneensis Petrovitz, 1962
- Aganocrossus ciprianii (Balthasar, 1939)
- Aganocrossus clementianus (Endrödi, 1964)
- Aganocrossus fugitivus (Péringuey, 1901)
- Aganocrossus hirtus (Bordat, 1992)
- Aganocrossus hutteri (Petrovitz, 1973)
- Aganocrossus ingloriosus (Schmidt, 1917)
- Aganocrossus krikkeni (Bordat, 1992)
- Aganocrossus meticulosus Paulian, 1942
- Aganocrossus newmanae Bordat, 2008
- Aganocrossus pallidicornis (Walker, 1858)
- Aganocrossus paraciprianii Bordat, 2008
- Aganocrossus periculosus (Bordat, 1992)
- Aganocrossus plicatus (Endrödi, 1964)
- Aganocrossus postpilosus (Reitter, 1895)
- Aganocrossus pseudamoenus (Müller, 1941)
- Aganocrossus pseudourostigma (Balthasar, 1939)
- Aganocrossus rudolfpetrovitzi Bordat, 2013
- Aganocrossus tacitus Bordat, 2008
- Aganocrossus urostigma (Harold, 1862)
- Aganocrossus vejdovskyi (Balthasar, 1945)
- Aganocrossus vestitus (Boheman, 1857)
