= Aganocrossus rudolfpetrovitzi =

Scientific classification
- Kingdom: Animalia
- Phylum: Arthropoda
- Clade: Pancrustacea
- Class: Insecta
- Order: Coleoptera
- Suborder: Polyphaga
- Infraorder: Scarabaeiformia
- Family: Scarabaeidae
- Genus: Aganocrossus
- Species: A. rudolfpetrovitzi

Binomial name
- Aganocrossus rudolfpetrovitzi Bordat, 2013

Species of beetle

Aganocrossus rudolfpetrovitzi is a species of beetle of the family Scarabaeidae. It is found in Burkina Faso, Cameroon, Chad, Guinea-Bissau, Niger, Nigeria and Senegal.

== Description ==
Adults reach a length of about 4.2–5.5 mm (0.17–0.22 in). They are reddish-brown to glossy brownish-black, or rarely entirely brownish-yellow. The anterior margin of the head, the lateral margins of the pronotum, and sometimes the elytra are slightly lighter. The elytra are pubescent and the legs are dark reddish-brown.

== Etymology ==
The species is named in honour of Rudolf Petrovitz.
