= Aganocrossus vestitus =

Scientific classification
- Kingdom: Animalia
- Phylum: Arthropoda
- Clade: Pancrustacea
- Class: Insecta
- Order: Coleoptera
- Suborder: Polyphaga
- Infraorder: Scarabaeiformia
- Family: Scarabaeidae
- Genus: Aganocrossus
- Species: A. vestitus

Binomial name
- Aganocrossus vestitus (Boheman, 1857)

Synonyms
- Aphodius vestitus Boheman, 1857

Species of beetle

Aganocrossus vestitus is a species of beetle of the family Scarabaeidae. It is found in Ethiopia, Kenya, Malawi, Namibia, the Democratic Republic of the Congo, South Africa, Somalia and Tanzania.

== Description ==
Adults reach a length of about 4.2–5.3 mm (0.17–0.21 in). The head and pronotum are reddish-brown, with the disc of the latter darker. The elytra are brownish-yellow, with the scutellum, the first interval and sometimes a spot dark brown.
