= Aganocrossus krikkeni =

Scientific classification
- Kingdom: Animalia
- Phylum: Arthropoda
- Clade: Pancrustacea
- Class: Insecta
- Order: Coleoptera
- Suborder: Polyphaga
- Infraorder: Scarabaeiformia
- Family: Scarabaeidae
- Genus: Aganocrossus
- Species: A. krikkeni

Binomial name
- Aganocrossus krikkeni (Bordat, 1992)

Synonyms
- Aphodius (Aganocrossus) krikkeni Bordat, 1992

Species of beetle

Aganocrossus krikkeni is a species of beetle of the family Scarabaeidae. It is found in Kenya.

== Description ==
Adults reach a length of about 4.5–5.2 mm (0.18–0.20 in). They have a convex, shiny, brown body, with part of the head, the disc of the pronotum, the lateral margins of the scutellum and the elytral striae dark. The elytra have long, erect hairs on the posterior half. The legs are brown.
