= Aganocrossus postpilosus =

Scientific classification
- Kingdom: Animalia
- Phylum: Arthropoda
- Clade: Pancrustacea
- Class: Insecta
- Order: Coleoptera
- Suborder: Polyphaga
- Infraorder: Scarabaeiformia
- Family: Scarabaeidae
- Genus: Aganocrossus
- Species: A. postpilosus

Binomial name
- Aganocrossus postpilosus (Reitter, 1895)

Synonyms
- Aphodius (Aganocrossus) postpilosus Reitter, 1895

Species of beetle

Aganocrossus postpilosus is a species of beetle of the family Scarabaeidae. It is found in China (Shanghai), India (Sikkim, Maharashtra, Rajasthan), Japan, Korea, Taiwan, Laos and Vietnam.

== Description ==
Adults reach a length of about 4–5 mm (0.16–0.20 in). They have an oblong, convex, shiny, piceous-blackish body. The head and pronotum are glabrous, while the elytra are pubescent on the sides and toward the apex. The antennae and legs are piceous-reddish.
