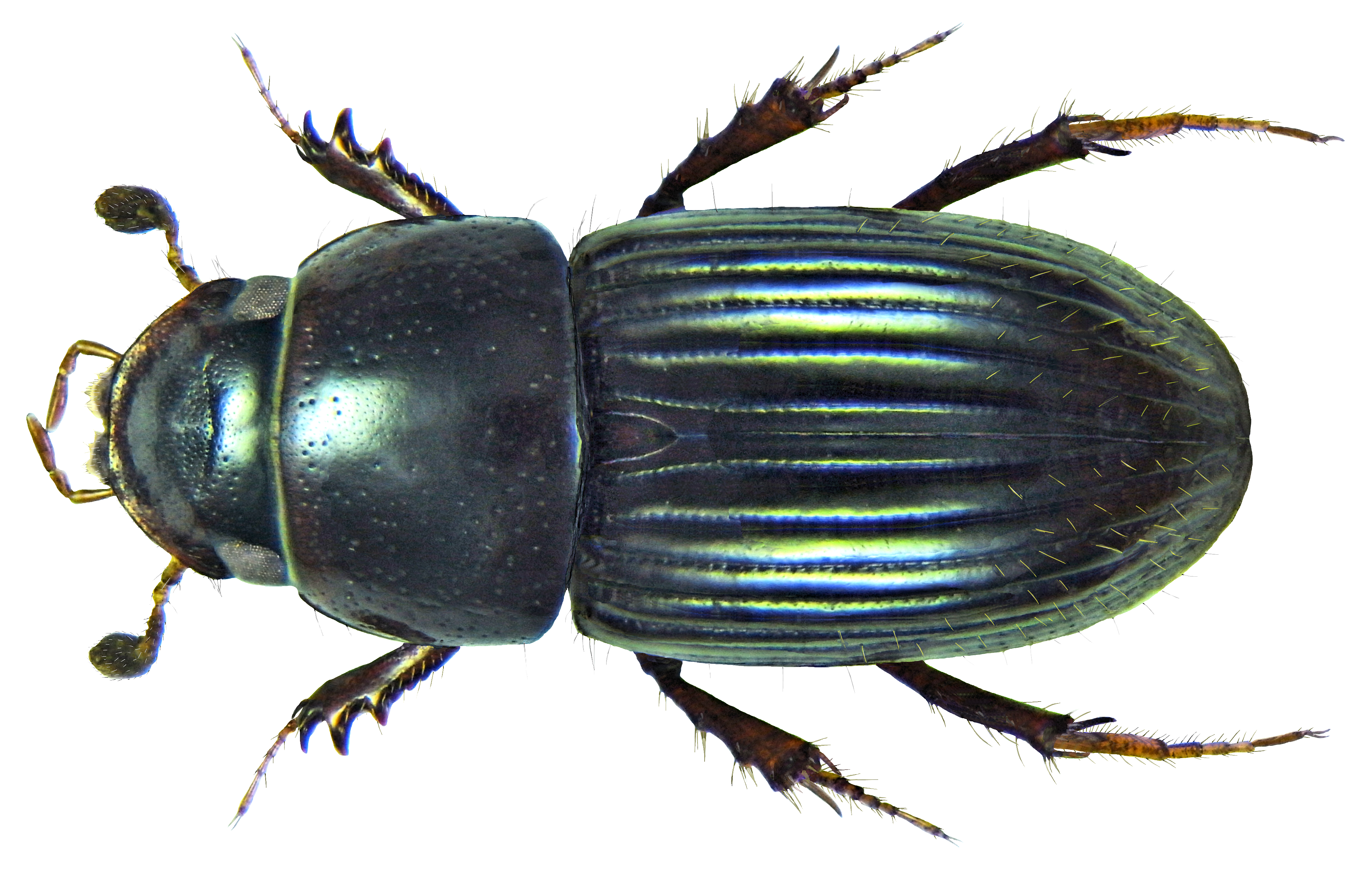

Scientific classification
- Kingdom: Animalia
- Phylum: Arthropoda
- Clade: Pancrustacea
- Class: Insecta
- Order: Coleoptera
- Suborder: Polyphaga
- Infraorder: Scarabaeiformia
- Family: Scarabaeidae
- Genus: Aganocrossus
- Species: A. urostigma

Binomial name
- Aganocrossus urostigma (Harold, 1862)

Synonyms
- Aphodius urostigma Harold, 1862; Aphodius (Aganocrossus) urostigma scutellata Petrovitz, 1963; Aphodius deplorandus Schmidt, 1907; Liothorax piceoniger Motschulsky, 1863; Aphodius compacticollis Motschulsky, 1858; Aphodius mixtus Motschulsky, 1858

= Aganocrossus urostigma =

Species of beetle

Aganocrossus urostigma, is a species of dung beetle found with a widespread distribution from Southern Afghanistan, Pakistan, India, Sri Lanka, Nepal, Bhutan, China; Taiwan, Korean Peninsula, Japan, towards Vietnam, Laos, Cambodia, Thailand, Malaysia: Malacca and Borneo; Indonesia, Philippines, and Russia.

== Description ==
Adults reach a length of about 4.8–5.8 mm (0.19–0.23 in). They have a shiny, blackish-brown body, with the lateral margins of the clypeus, pronotum and elytra reddish and the legs dark rust-red.

== Life history ==
Adult beetles are active from early June to late September. They are commonly observed from the droppings of horses and cows and sometimes from human excreta.

== Taxonomy ==
This species was formerly a member of the genus Aphodius.
