= Aganocrossus hutteri =

Scientific classification
- Kingdom: Animalia
- Phylum: Arthropoda
- Clade: Pancrustacea
- Class: Insecta
- Order: Coleoptera
- Suborder: Polyphaga
- Infraorder: Scarabaeiformia
- Family: Scarabaeidae
- Genus: Aganocrossus
- Species: A. hutteri

Binomial name
- Aganocrossus hutteri (Petrovitz, 1973)

Synonyms
- Aphodius (Aganocrossus) hutteri Petrovitz, 1973

Species of beetle

Aganocrossus hutteri is a species of beetle of the family Scarabaeidae. It is found in Burkina Faso, Chad, Mali, Niger, Nigeria and Senegal.

== Description ==
Adults reach a length of about 3.5–4 mm (0.14–0.16 in). The head and pronotum are dark brown, with the margins of the clypeus and the anterior angles of the pronotum with a pale, reddish translucency. The body is smooth and shiny, except for the dull apex of the elytra.
