= Aganocrossus apicenotatus =

Scientific classification
- Kingdom: Animalia
- Phylum: Arthropoda
- Clade: Pancrustacea
- Class: Insecta
- Order: Coleoptera
- Suborder: Polyphaga
- Infraorder: Scarabaeiformia
- Family: Scarabaeidae
- Genus: Aganocrossus
- Species: A. apicenotatus

Binomial name
- Aganocrossus apicenotatus (Müller, 1941)

Synonyms
- Aphodius (Aganocrossus) apicenotatus Müller, 1941; Aphodius (Aganocrossus) fenestrellus Balthasar, 1941

Species of beetle

Aganocrossus apicenotatus is a species of beetle of the family Scarabaeidae. It is found in Ethiopia and Kenya.

== Description ==
Adults reach a length of about 4.3–5.5 mm (0.17–0.22 in).
