= Aganocrossus ingloriosus =

Scientific classification
- Kingdom: Animalia
- Phylum: Arthropoda
- Clade: Pancrustacea
- Class: Insecta
- Order: Coleoptera
- Suborder: Polyphaga
- Infraorder: Scarabaeiformia
- Family: Scarabaeidae
- Genus: Aganocrossus
- Species: A. ingloriosus

Binomial name
- Aganocrossus ingloriosus (Schmidt, 1917)

Synonyms
- Aphodius (Trichaphodius) ingloriosus Schmidt, 1917

Species of beetle

Aganocrossus ingloriosus is a species of beetle of the family Scarabaeidae. It is found in Cameroon.

== Description ==
Adults reach a length of about 5–6 mm (0.20–0.24 in). They are glossy brownish-red, with the frontal suture, the posterior part of the vertex along the anterior margin of the pronotum, the pronotal disc, the lateral margins of the scutellum, and the elytral striae darkened. The elytra are pubescent at the apex.
