= Aganocrossus vejdovskyi =

Scientific classification
- Kingdom: Animalia
- Phylum: Arthropoda
- Clade: Pancrustacea
- Class: Insecta
- Order: Coleoptera
- Suborder: Polyphaga
- Infraorder: Scarabaeiformia
- Family: Scarabaeidae
- Genus: Aganocrossus
- Species: A. vejdovskyi

Binomial name
- Aganocrossus vejdovskyi (Balthasar, 1945)

Synonyms
- Aphodius (Aganocrossus) vejdovskyi Balthasar, 1945

Species of beetle

Aganocrossus vejdovskyi is a species of beetle of the family Scarabaeidae. It is found in Algeria and Ethiopia.

== Description ==
Adults reach a length of about 4.8 mm (0.19 in). They have an elongate, rather convex, fairly shiny, chestnut-brown body, with the sides of the head and pronotum, as well as the second interval of the elytra, lighter yellowish-brown. The legs are light brown.
