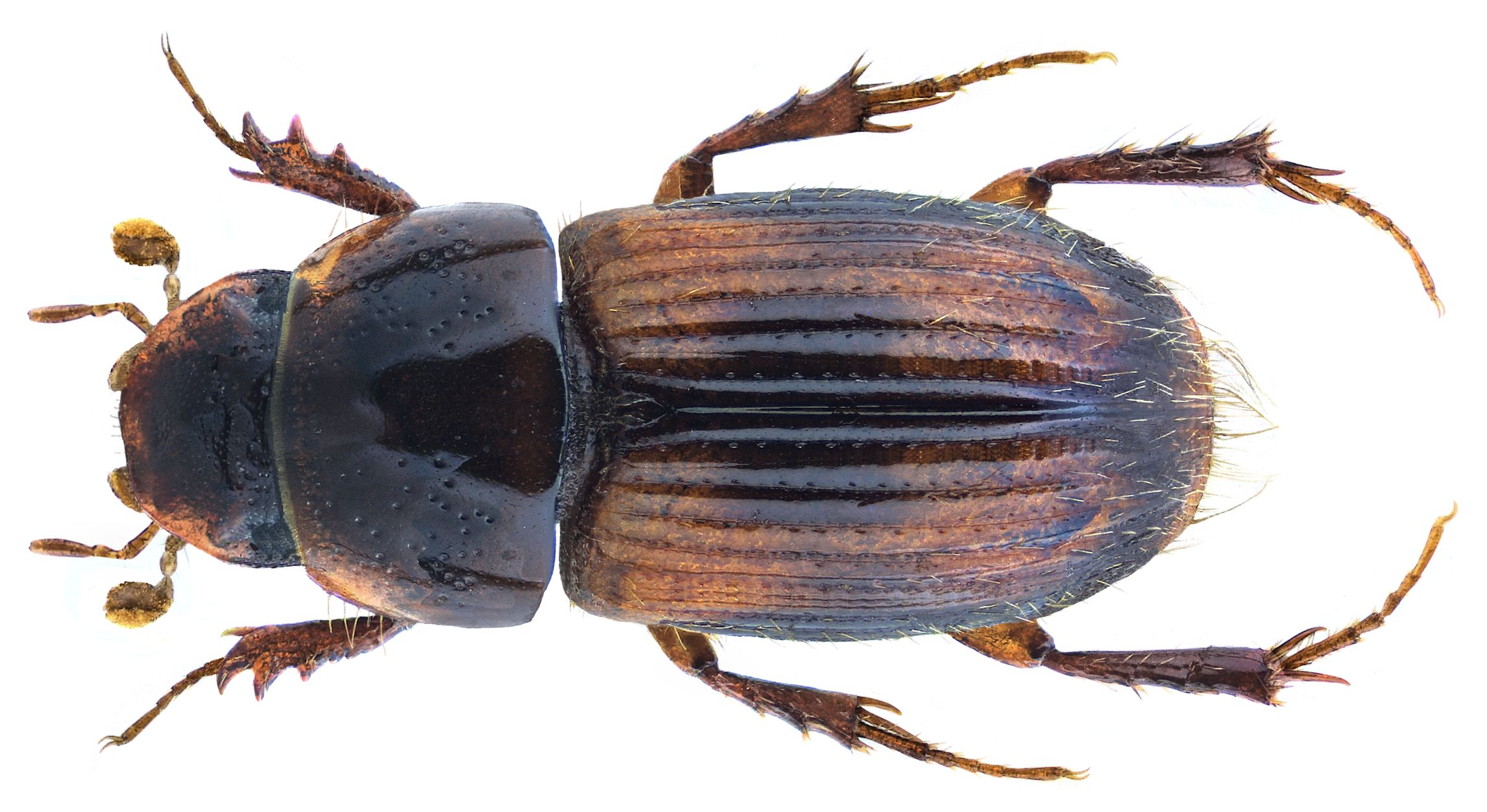

Scientific classification
- Kingdom: Animalia
- Phylum: Arthropoda
- Clade: Pancrustacea
- Class: Insecta
- Order: Coleoptera
- Suborder: Polyphaga
- Infraorder: Scarabaeiformia
- Family: Scarabaeidae
- Genus: Aganocrossus
- Species: A. amoenus

Binomial name
- Aganocrossus amoenus (Boheman, 1857)

Synonyms
- Aphodius amoenus Boheman, 1857; Aphodius (Aganocrossus) amoenus fuscus Petrovitz, 1962; Aphodius amoenus impugnans Schmidt, 1907; Aphodius centralis Harold, 1868

= Aganocrossus amoenus =

Species of beetle

Aganocrossus amoenus is a species of dung beetle found in Afro-tropical regional countries (Angola, Burundi, Chad, Cameroon, Ethiopia, Ghana, Ivory Coast, Kenya, Namibia, Niger, Mozambique, Democratic Republic of the Congo, Guinea, South Africa, Rwanda, Senegal, Sudan, Tanzania, Zimbabwe, Madagascar), as well as in India and Sri Lanka.

== Description ==
Adults reach a length of about 4–5 mm (0.16–0.20 in). They are blackish-brown with the sides and the anterior margin of the pronotum yellowish-red and the elytra light or reddish-brown.
