= Aganocrossus ciprianii =

Scientific classification
- Kingdom: Animalia
- Phylum: Arthropoda
- Clade: Pancrustacea
- Class: Insecta
- Order: Coleoptera
- Suborder: Polyphaga
- Infraorder: Scarabaeiformia
- Family: Scarabaeidae
- Genus: Aganocrossus
- Species: A. ciprianii

Binomial name
- Aganocrossus ciprianii (Balthasar, 1939)

Synonyms
- Aphodius (Aganocrossus) ciprianii Balthasar, 1939

Species of beetle

Aganocrossus ciprianii is a species of beetle of the family Scarabaeidae. It is found in Kenya, the Democratic Republic of the Congo and Zimbabwe.

== Description ==
Adults reach a length of about 4–5 mm (0.16–0.20 in). They have an elongate, dark brown body, with the sides of the pronotum and the sides of the clypeus lighter. The integument has a satiny appearance.
