= Pseudacrossus sharpi =

Scientific classification
- Kingdom: Animalia
- Phylum: Arthropoda
- Clade: Pancrustacea
- Class: Insecta
- Order: Coleoptera
- Suborder: Polyphaga
- Infraorder: Scarabaeiformia
- Family: Scarabaeidae
- Genus: Pseudacrossus
- Species: P. sharpi

Binomial name
- Pseudacrossus sharpi (Harold, 1874)

Synonyms
- Aphodius sharpi Harold, 1874

Species of beetle

Pseudacrossus sharpi is a species of beetle of the family Scarabaeidae. It is found in Algeria, Morocco, Portugal, Spain and Tunisia.

== Description ==
Adults reach a length of about 4–5 mm (0.16–0.20 in). They have an elongate-oval, quite strongly convex, glossy body. The head, pronotum and scutellum are black or blackish-brown, while the elytra range from dark reddish-brown to almost blackish-brown. The legs are dark reddish-brown.
