= Pseudacrossus nasutus =

Scientific classification
- Kingdom: Animalia
- Phylum: Arthropoda
- Clade: Pancrustacea
- Class: Insecta
- Order: Coleoptera
- Suborder: Polyphaga
- Infraorder: Scarabaeiformia
- Family: Scarabaeidae
- Genus: Pseudacrossus
- Species: P. nasutus

Binomial name
- Pseudacrossus nasutus (Reitter, 1887)

Synonyms
- Aphodius nasutus Reitter, 1887; Aphodius (Pseudagolius) necopinus Balthasar, 1932; Aphodius (Chilothorax) kelleri Koshantschikov, 1911; Aphodius (Melinopterus) mehelyi Csiki, 1901; Aphodius (Melinopterus) roschlapili Csiki, 1901; Aphodius permodicus Reitter, 1895; Aphodius (Amidorus) consors Reitter, 1892

Species of beetle

Pseudacrossus nasutus is a species of beetle of the family Scarabaeidae. It is found in China (Beijing, Nei Mongol, Qinghai, Shanghai, Xinjiang, Xizang), Mongolia, the Russian Far East and Siberia.

== Description ==
Adults reach a length of about 4.5–5.5 mm (0.18–0.22 in). They have a quite strongly convex, shiny, glabrous body. The head, pronotum and scutellum are black, the sides of the pronotum sometimes with a reddish translucence. The elytra are light to dark reddish-brown. The legs are reddish-brown.
