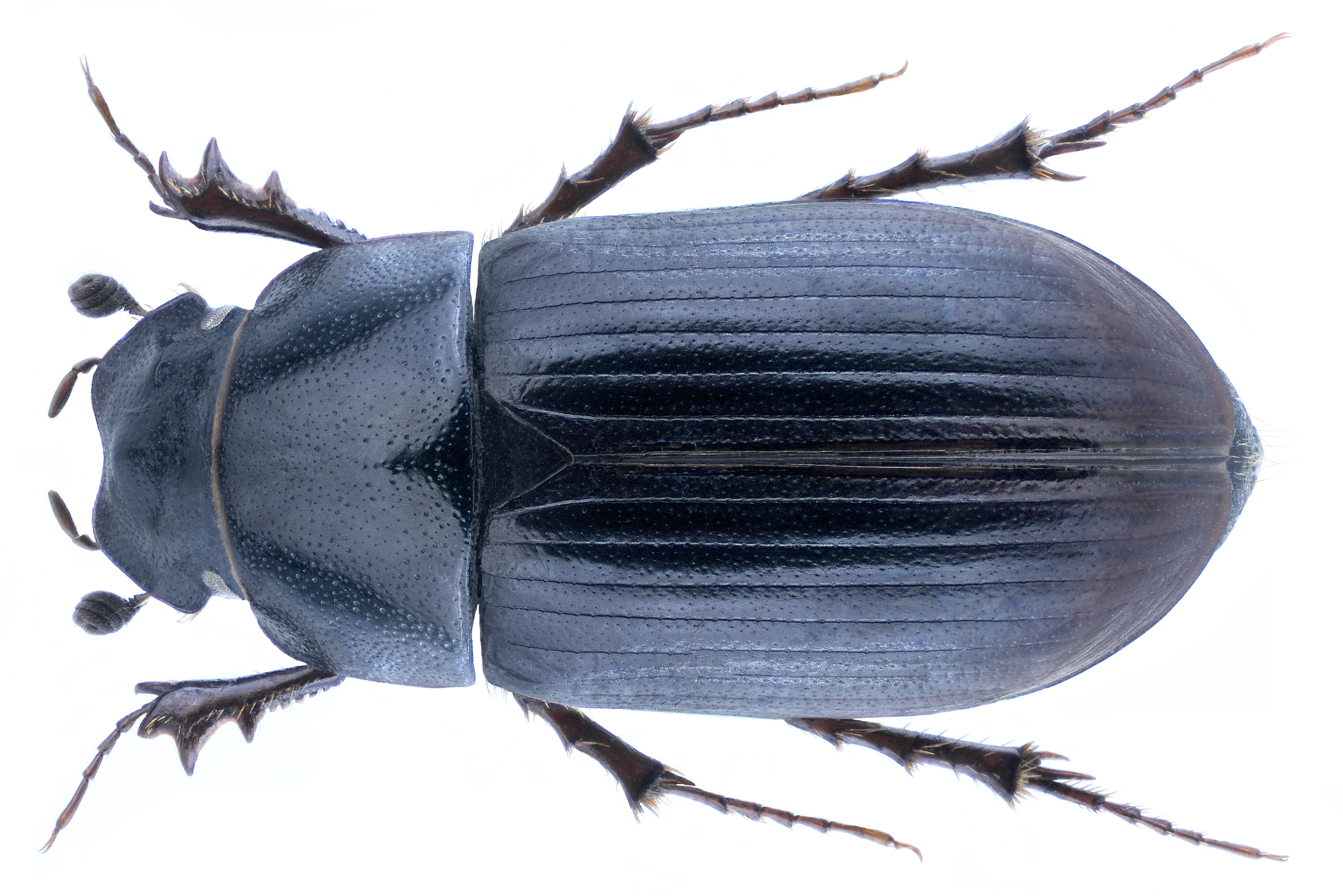
- Pseudacrossus przewalskyi, Kyrgyzstan

Scientific classification
- Kingdom: Animalia
- Phylum: Arthropoda
- Clade: Pancrustacea
- Class: Insecta
- Order: Coleoptera
- Suborder: Polyphaga
- Infraorder: Scarabaeiformia
- Family: Scarabaeidae
- Subfamily: Aphodiinae
- Tribe: Aphodiini
- Genus: Pseudacrossus; Reitter, 1892

Synonyms
- Aphodius (Pseudacrossus) Reitter, 1892

= Pseudacrossus =

Genus of beetles

Pseudacrossus is a genus of scarab beetles in the family Scarabaeidae. It is distributed across the Palearctic and Nearctic realms.

== Species ==
The genus Pseudacrossus comprises the following species, many of which were previously classified as part of the genus Aphodius:

- Pseudacrossus absconditus (Balthasar, 1932)
- Pseudacrossus beringi Berlov, 1989
- Pseudacrossus grebenscikovi (Balthasar, 1961)
- Pseudacrossus grombczewskyi (Koshantschikov, 1891)
- Pseudacrossus kalabi (Král, 1997)
- Pseudacrossus kuskai (Stebnicka, 1982)
- Pseudacrossus nasutus (Reitter, 1887)
- Pseudacrossus przewalskyi (Reitter, 1887)
- Pseudacrossus qinghaiensis (Král, 1997)
- Pseudacrossus serrimargo (Koshantschikov, 1913)
- Pseudacrossus sharpi (Harold, 1874)
- Pseudacrossus smetanai (Král, 2011)
- Pseudacrossus subsericeus (Ballion, 1878)
- Pseudacrossus suffertus (Schmidt, 1916)
- Pseudacrossus tenebricosus (Schmidt, 1916)
- Pseudacrossus wewalkai (Petrovitz, 1971)
- Pseudacrossus zuercheri (Reitter, 1908)
