= Pseudacrossus grebenscikovi =

Scientific classification
- Kingdom: Animalia
- Phylum: Arthropoda
- Clade: Pancrustacea
- Class: Insecta
- Order: Coleoptera
- Suborder: Polyphaga
- Infraorder: Scarabaeiformia
- Family: Scarabaeidae
- Genus: Pseudacrossus
- Species: P. grebenscikovi

Binomial name
- Pseudacrossus grebenscikovi (Balthasar, 1961)

Synonyms
- Aphodius (Pseudagolius) grebenscikovi Balthasar, 1961

Species of beetle

Pseudacrossus grebenscikovi is a species of beetle of the family Scarabaeidae. It is found in Mongolia.

== Description ==
Adults reach a length of about 6.2–6.7 mm (0.24–0.26 in). They have an elongate-oval, moderately convex, shiny body. The tips of the elytra have short hairs. The head, pronotum and scutellum are blackish-brown, while the elytra are yellowish-brown with a darkened sutural margin and small dark spots. The legs are brown.
