= Pseudacrossus grombczewskyi =

Scientific classification
- Kingdom: Animalia
- Phylum: Arthropoda
- Clade: Pancrustacea
- Class: Insecta
- Order: Coleoptera
- Suborder: Polyphaga
- Infraorder: Scarabaeiformia
- Family: Scarabaeidae
- Genus: Pseudacrossus
- Species: P. grombczewskyi

Binomial name
- Pseudacrossus grombczewskyi (Koshantschikov, 1891)

Synonyms
- Aphodius grombczewskyi Koshantschikov, 1891; Aphodius grombczewskyi daraignezi Clermont, 1907

Species of beetle

Pseudacrossus grombczewskyi is a species of beetle of the family Scarabaeidae. It is found in China (Xinjiang), Kazakhstan, Kyrgyzstan, Tajikistan and Uzbekistan.

== Description ==
Adults reach a length of about 6–8 mm (0.24–0.31 in). They have an oblong, convex, moderately shiny, nearly glabrous, blackish body, with the elytra shortly pubescent apically.
