= Pseudacrossus tenebricosus =

Scientific classification
- Kingdom: Animalia
- Phylum: Arthropoda
- Clade: Pancrustacea
- Class: Insecta
- Order: Coleoptera
- Suborder: Polyphaga
- Infraorder: Scarabaeiformia
- Family: Scarabaeidae
- Genus: Pseudacrossus
- Species: P. tenebricosus

Binomial name
- Pseudacrossus tenebricosus (Schmidt, 1917)

Synonyms
- Aphodius tenebricosus Schmidt, 1917; Agrilinus (Pseudagrilinus) tenebricosus marmaotus Negrobov, 2010; Aphodius (Pseudacrossus) caminarius Reitter, 1892

Species of beetle

Pseudacrossus tenebricosus is a species of beetle of the family Scarabaeidae. It is found in Kazakhstan and Russia (including Siberia).

== Description ==
Adults reach a length of about 6–7 mm (0.24–0.28 in). They have an elongate, moderately convex, glabrous, shining, black body, with the anterior angles of the pronotum and the tips of the elytra reddish-brown. The legs are also reddish-brown.
