= Pseudacrossus absconditus =

Scientific classification
- Kingdom: Animalia
- Phylum: Arthropoda
- Clade: Pancrustacea
- Class: Insecta
- Order: Coleoptera
- Suborder: Polyphaga
- Infraorder: Scarabaeiformia
- Family: Scarabaeidae
- Genus: Pseudacrossus
- Species: P. absconditus

Binomial name
- Pseudacrossus absconditus (Balthasar, 1932)

Synonyms
- Aphodius (Pseudacrossus) pfefferi absconditus Balthasar, 1932

Species of beetle

Pseudacrossus absconditus is a species of beetle of the family Scarabaeidae. It is found in China (Sichuan).

== Description ==
Adults reach a length of about 6–6.5 mm (0.24–0.26 in). They have an elongate-oval, moderately convex, glabrous body. The forebody is dark brown and glossy, with the front of the head and the sides of the pronotum bordered with yellowish-brown. The elytra are less glossy, yellowish-brown, with a darkened suture. The scutellum is dark and the underside and legs are brown.
