= Pseudacrossus subsericeus =

Scientific classification
- Kingdom: Animalia
- Phylum: Arthropoda
- Clade: Pancrustacea
- Class: Insecta
- Order: Coleoptera
- Suborder: Polyphaga
- Infraorder: Scarabaeiformia
- Family: Scarabaeidae
- Genus: Pseudacrossus
- Species: P. subsericeus

Binomial name
- Pseudacrossus subsericeus (Ballion, 1878)

Synonyms
- Aphodius subsericeus Ballion, 1878; Aphodius (Amidorus) impolitus Schmidt, 1909

Species of beetle

Pseudacrossus subsericeus is a species of beetle of the family Scarabaeidae. It is found in China (Qinghai, Xinjiang, Xizang), Kazakhstan and Kyrgyzstan.

== Description ==
Adults reach a length of about 6–7 mm (0.24–0.28 in). They are black, with the head and pronotum slightly shiny, while the elytra are dull. The legs are blackish-brown, with the tarsi somewhat lighter.
