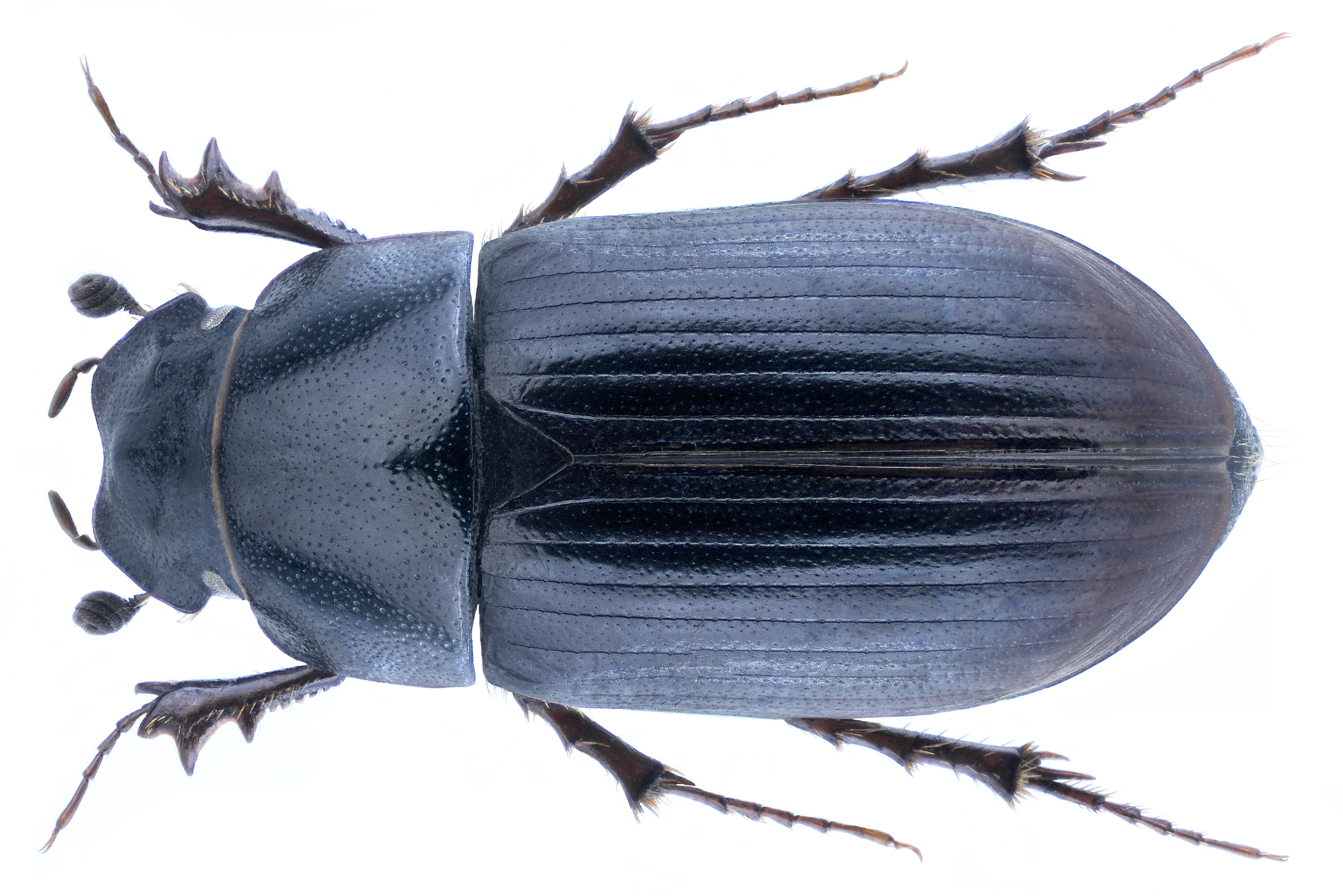

Scientific classification
- Kingdom: Animalia
- Phylum: Arthropoda
- Clade: Pancrustacea
- Class: Insecta
- Order: Coleoptera
- Suborder: Polyphaga
- Infraorder: Scarabaeiformia
- Family: Scarabaeidae
- Genus: Pseudacrossus
- Species: P. przewalskyi

Binomial name
- Pseudacrossus przewalskyi (Reitter, 1887)

Synonyms
- Aphodius (Acrossus) przewalskyi Reitter, 1887; Aphodius (Platyderides) friedrichi Petrovitz, 1958

= Pseudacrossus przewalskyi =

Species of beetle

Pseudacrossus przewalskyi is a species of beetle of the family Scarabaeidae. It is found in China (Qinghai, Sichuan, Xinjiang, Xizang).

== Description ==
Adults reach a length of about 6–7.5 mm (0.24–0.30 in). They have a slightly convex, blackish-brown body, with the sides of the pronotum and a large part of the elytra light reddish-brown. The antennae are black.
