= Pseudacrossus suffertus =

Scientific classification
- Kingdom: Animalia
- Phylum: Arthropoda
- Clade: Pancrustacea
- Class: Insecta
- Order: Coleoptera
- Suborder: Polyphaga
- Infraorder: Scarabaeiformia
- Family: Scarabaeidae
- Genus: Pseudacrossus
- Species: P. suffertus

Binomial name
- Pseudacrossus suffertus (Schmidt, 1917)

Synonyms
- Aphodius suffertus Schmidt, 1917; Aphodius dilatatus Reiche & Saulcy, 1856; Aphodius (Amidorus) dilatatus ampliatus Reitter, 1892; Aphodius (Amidorus) defiorii Fiori, 1907; Aphodius (Pseudacrossus) suffertus ampliatoides Dellacasa, 1983; Aphodius (Pseudacrossus) suffertus ampollinensis Dellacasa, 1983

Species of beetle

Pseudacrossus suffertus is a species of beetle of the family Scarabaeidae. It is found in Italy, Greece, Cyprus, Syria and Turkey.

== Description ==
Adults reach a length of about 5–6 mm (0.20–0.24 in). They have a strongly convex, glossy, black or dark reddish-brown body, with the anterior angles of the pronotum lighter. The elytra have a darkened sutural margin and a pattern of dark linear markings. In some specimens, the elytra are yellowish-brown, while they are light reddish-brown in others.

== Subspecies ==
- Pseudacrossus suffertus suffertus (Greece, Cyprus, Syria, Turkey)
- Pseudacrossus suffertus ampliatus (Reitter, 1892) (Italy: Sicily)
- Pseudacrossus suffertus defiorei (Fiori, 1907) (Italy)
