= Pseudacrossus zuercheri =

Scientific classification
- Kingdom: Animalia
- Phylum: Arthropoda
- Clade: Pancrustacea
- Class: Insecta
- Order: Coleoptera
- Suborder: Polyphaga
- Infraorder: Scarabaeiformia
- Family: Scarabaeidae
- Genus: Pseudacrossus
- Species: P. zuercheri

Binomial name
- Pseudacrossus zuercheri (Reitter, 1908)

Synonyms
- Aphodius (Pseudacrossus) zuercheri Reitter, 1908; Pseudacrossus zurcheri

Species of beetle

Pseudacrossus zuercheri is a species of beetle of the family Scarabaeidae. It is found in Turkey.

== Description ==
Adults reach a length of about 5.5–7 mm (0.22–0.28 in). They have a quite strongly convex, shining, glabrous, black to blackish-brown body, with the legs dark brown and the tarsi lighter.
