= Esymus pyreti =

Scientific classification
- Kingdom: Animalia
- Phylum: Arthropoda
- Clade: Pancrustacea
- Class: Insecta
- Order: Coleoptera
- Suborder: Polyphaga
- Infraorder: Scarabaeiformia
- Family: Scarabaeidae
- Genus: Esymus
- Species: E. pyreti

Binomial name
- Esymus pyreti (Penecke, 1911)

Synonyms
- Aphodius (Esimus) pyreti Penecke, 1911

Species of beetle

Esymus pyreti is a species of beetle of the family Scarabaeidae. It is found in Ukraine.

== Description ==
Adults reach a length of about 3.5 mm (0.14 in). They are very similar to Esymus merdarius, but less glossy. The pronotum has yellowish-red anterior angles and the elytra are yellowish-brown, with a dark sutural interval and dark lateral and apical margins.
