= Esymus filitarsis =

Scientific classification
- Kingdom: Animalia
- Phylum: Arthropoda
- Clade: Pancrustacea
- Class: Insecta
- Order: Coleoptera
- Suborder: Polyphaga
- Infraorder: Scarabaeiformia
- Family: Scarabaeidae
- Genus: Esymus
- Species: E. filitarsis

Binomial name
- Esymus filitarsis (Reitter, 1898)

Synonyms
- Aphodius (Esimus) filitarsis Reitter, 1898

Species of beetle

Esymus filitarsis is a species of beetle of the family Scarabaeidae. It is found in Syria and Lebanon.

== Description ==
Adults reach a length of about 3–3.5 mm (0.12–0.14 in). They have a shiny, glabrous, blackish-brown body, with the sides of the pronotum yellowish-red. The elytra are yellowish-brown with a darkened sutural margin and the legs are reddish-brown.
