= Esymus =

Scientific classification
- Kingdom: Animalia
- Phylum: Arthropoda
- Clade: Pancrustacea
- Class: Insecta
- Order: Coleoptera
- Suborder: Polyphaga
- Infraorder: Scarabaeiformia
- Family: Scarabaeidae
- Subfamily: Aphodiinae
- Tribe: Aphodiini
- Genus: Esymus; Mulsant & Rey, 1870

Synonyms
- Aphodius (Esymus) Mulsant & Rey, 1870; Aphodius (Orodalus) Mulsant & Rey, 1870

Genus of beetles

Esymus is a genus of beetles of the family Scarabaeidae.

== Species ==
- Esymus alaiensis (Reitter, 1892)
- Esymus alkani (Petrovitz, 1963)
- Esymus evanescens (Boheman, 1857)
- Esymus filitarsis (Reitter, 1898)
- Esymus finitimus (Schmidt, 1917)
- Esymus helenaeliviae (Dellacasa & Pittino, 1985)
- Esymus hladili (Chromý, 1993)
- Esymus hyalinus (Petrovitz, 1961)
- Esymus indulgens (Balthasar, 1960)
- Esymus merdarius (Fabricius, 1775)
- Esymus ornatulus (Harold, 1866)
- Esymus pokornyi (Chromý, 1993)
- Esymus pusillus (Herbst, 1789)
- Esymus pyreti (Penecke, 1911)
- Esymus sesquivittatus (Fairmaire, 1883)
- Esymus sicardi (Reitter, 1892)
