= Esymus indulgens =

Scientific classification
- Kingdom: Animalia
- Phylum: Arthropoda
- Clade: Pancrustacea
- Class: Insecta
- Order: Coleoptera
- Suborder: Polyphaga
- Infraorder: Scarabaeiformia
- Family: Scarabaeidae
- Genus: Esymus
- Species: E. indulgens

Binomial name
- Esymus indulgens (Balthasar, 1960)

Synonyms
- Aphodius (Esymus) indulgens Balthasar, 1960

Species of beetle

Esymus indulgens is a species of beetle of the family Scarabaeidae. It is found in Afghanistan, Pakistan and Turkmenistan.

== Description ==
Adults reach a length of about 3.5–4 mm (0.14–0.16 in). They have a fairly parallel-sided body, with the dorsal surface glabrous and shiny. The elytra are less lustrous and have some short hairs. The head, pronotum and scutellum are dark brown, with the anterior angles of the pronotum reddish. The elytra are brownish-yellow, with the sutural interval dark brown. The legs are reddish-brown.
