= Esymus alaiensis =

Scientific classification
- Kingdom: Animalia
- Phylum: Arthropoda
- Clade: Pancrustacea
- Class: Insecta
- Order: Coleoptera
- Suborder: Polyphaga
- Infraorder: Scarabaeiformia
- Family: Scarabaeidae
- Genus: Esymus
- Species: E. alaiensis

Binomial name
- Esymus alaiensis (Reitter, 1892)

Synonyms
- Aphodius (Esimus) alaiensis Reitter, 1892; Aphodius (Esimaphodius) nasalis Koshantschikov, 1894

Species of beetle

Esymus alaiensis is a species of beetle of the family Scarabaeidae. It is found in Afghanistan, Kazakhstan, Kyrgyzstan, Tajikistan and Turkmenistan.

== Description ==
Adults reach a length of about 3–3.5 mm (0.12–0.14 in). They have an elongate-oval, moderately convex, glabrous, shiny, black body, with the pronotum less lighter-colored at the anterior angles. The elytra are yellowish-brown, with the sutural interval black. The legs are brown.
