= Esymus finitimus =

Scientific classification
- Kingdom: Animalia
- Phylum: Arthropoda
- Clade: Pancrustacea
- Class: Insecta
- Order: Coleoptera
- Suborder: Polyphaga
- Infraorder: Scarabaeiformia
- Family: Scarabaeidae
- Genus: Esymus
- Species: E. finitimus

Binomial name
- Esymus finitimus (Schmidt, 1917)

Synonyms
- Aphodius finitimus Schmidt, 1917; Aphodius terminatus Marseul, 1878

Species of beetle

Esymus finitimus is a species of beetle of the family Scarabaeidae. It is found in Algeria, Morocco and Tunisia.

== Description ==
Adults reach a length of about 3.5–4.2 mm (0.14–0.17 in). They have an elongate-oval, glabrous, black or blackish-brown body, with the sides of the clypeus and the pronotum yellowish-red. The elytra are light yellowish-brown, with the sutural interval dark brown and the apex and lateral margins sometimes darkened. The legs are brown.
