= Esymus ornatulus =

Scientific classification
- Kingdom: Animalia
- Phylum: Arthropoda
- Clade: Pancrustacea
- Class: Insecta
- Order: Coleoptera
- Suborder: Polyphaga
- Infraorder: Scarabaeiformia
- Family: Scarabaeidae
- Genus: Esymus
- Species: E. ornatulus

Binomial name
- Esymus ornatulus (Harold, 1866)

Synonyms
- Aphodius ornatulus Harold, 1866; Aphodius (Erytus) vittipennis Sahlberg, 1908

Species of beetle

Esymus ornatulus is a species of beetle of the family Scarabaeidae. It is found in Iran, Israel, Lebanon, Syria and Turkey.

== Description ==
Adults reach a length of about 3–3.5 mm (0.12–0.14 in). They have an elongate, slightly convex, glabrous, fairly shiny, black or blackish-brown body, with the anterior angles of the pronotum lighter. The elytra are yellowish-brown, with the three inner intervals, the outermost intervals, and the apical margin reddish-brown to black. The legs are light brown.
