= Esymus sesquivittatus =

Scientific classification
- Kingdom: Animalia
- Phylum: Arthropoda
- Clade: Pancrustacea
- Class: Insecta
- Order: Coleoptera
- Suborder: Polyphaga
- Infraorder: Scarabaeiformia
- Family: Scarabaeidae
- Genus: Esymus
- Species: E. sesquivittatus

Binomial name
- Esymus sesquivittatus (Fairmaire, 1883)

Synonyms
- Aphodius sesquivittatus Fairmaire, 1883; Aphodius (Volinus) sesquivittatus fuentei Báguena, 1930; Aphodius (Volinus) sesquivittatus oligopistus Báguena, 1930

Species of beetle

Esymus sesquivittatus is a species of beetle of the family Scarabaeidae. It is found in Algeria, Libya, Morocco, Spain and Tunisia.

== Description ==
Adults reach a length of about 3.5–4 mm (0.14–0.16 in). They have an oblong, moderately convex, alutaceous, almost glabrous body. The head and pronotum are blackish, the latter with yellowish sides. The scutellum is blackish and the elytra are yellowish with an elongate blackish stripe. The legs are reddish-brown and the antennal club is piceous.
