= Esymus sicardi =

Scientific classification
- Kingdom: Animalia
- Phylum: Arthropoda
- Clade: Pancrustacea
- Class: Insecta
- Order: Coleoptera
- Suborder: Polyphaga
- Infraorder: Scarabaeiformia
- Family: Scarabaeidae
- Genus: Esymus
- Species: E. sicardi

Binomial name
- Esymus sicardi (Reitter, 1892)

Synonyms
- Aphodius (Esimus) sicardi Reitter, 1892

Species of beetle

Esymus sicardi is a species of beetle of the family Scarabaeidae. It is found in Algeria, Morocco and Tunisia.

== Description ==
Adults reach a length of about 4.2–4.7 mm (0.17–0.19 in). They have a fairly parallel-sided, shiny, glabrous, black body. The elytra are pale yellow with a black sutural interval and the lateral margins are somewhat darkened. The legs are blackish-brown.
