= Esymus pusillus =

Scientific classification
- Kingdom: Animalia
- Phylum: Arthropoda
- Clade: Pancrustacea
- Class: Insecta
- Order: Coleoptera
- Suborder: Polyphaga
- Infraorder: Scarabaeiformia
- Family: Scarabaeidae
- Genus: Esymus
- Species: E. pusillus

Binomial name
- Esymus pusillus (Herbst, 1789)

Synonyms
- Scarabaeus pusillus Herbst, 1789; Aphodius (Orodalus) pusillus coeni Schmidt, 1922; Aphodius (Phaeaphodius) fusculus Reitter, 1892; Aphodius pusillus bicolor Dalla Torre, 1879; Aphodius rufangulus Waterhouse, 1875; Aphodius parvulus Hochhuth, 1873; Aphodius foenellus Gistel, 1857; Aphodius tachypus Gistel, 1857; Aphodius pusillus coecus Mulsant, 1842; Aphodius pusillus macularis Mulsant, 1842; Aphodius pusillus rufulus Mulsant, 1842; Aphodius bipustulatus Dejean, 1833; Aphodius phaeopterus Stephens, 1830; Aphodius coenosus Ahrens, 1812; Aphodius granum Gyllenhal, 1808; Scarabaeus haemorrhoidalis Olivier, 1789; Scarabaeus granarius Fabricius, 1775; Aphodius (Nobius) roubali Balthasar, 1932; Aphodius (Nobius) roubali dechlamydatus Balthasar, 1932; Aphodius (Orodalus) pusillus ochripennis Reitter, 1892

Species of beetle

Esymus pusillus is a species of beetle of the family Scarabaeidae. It is widely distributed in the Palearctic region.

== Description ==
Adults reach a length of about 3–4.5 mm (0.12–0.18 in). They have a shiny, glabrous, black or blackish-brown body, with the anterior angles or the entire lateral margins of the pronotum reddish-brown. The elytra are black or reddish-brown.

== Life history ==
Specimens have been collected from cow, horse, human, sheep and dog dung, as well as dung from other animals.

== Subspecies ==
- Esymus pusillus pusillus (Albania, Andorra, Armenia, Austria, Azerbaijan, Belarus, Belgium, Bosnia Herzegovina, Bulgaria, Croatia, Czech Republic, Denmark, Estonia, Finland, France, Georgia, Germany, Great Britain, Greece, Hungary, Iran, Ireland, Israel, Italy, Japan, Kazakhstan, Kosovo, Kyrgyzstan, Latvia, Lithuania, Macedonia, Mongolia, Montenegro, Netherlands, Norway, Poland, Portugal, Romania, Russia (including Siberia), Serbia, Slovakia, Slovenia, Spain, Sweden, Switzerland, Tajikistan, Turkey, Turkmenistan, Ukraine, Uzbekistan)
- Esymus pusillus roubali (Balthasar, 1932) (Korea, Russian Far East, Siberia, China: Beijing, Gansu, Jilin, Liaoning, Shanghai, Sichuan, Xinjiang)
