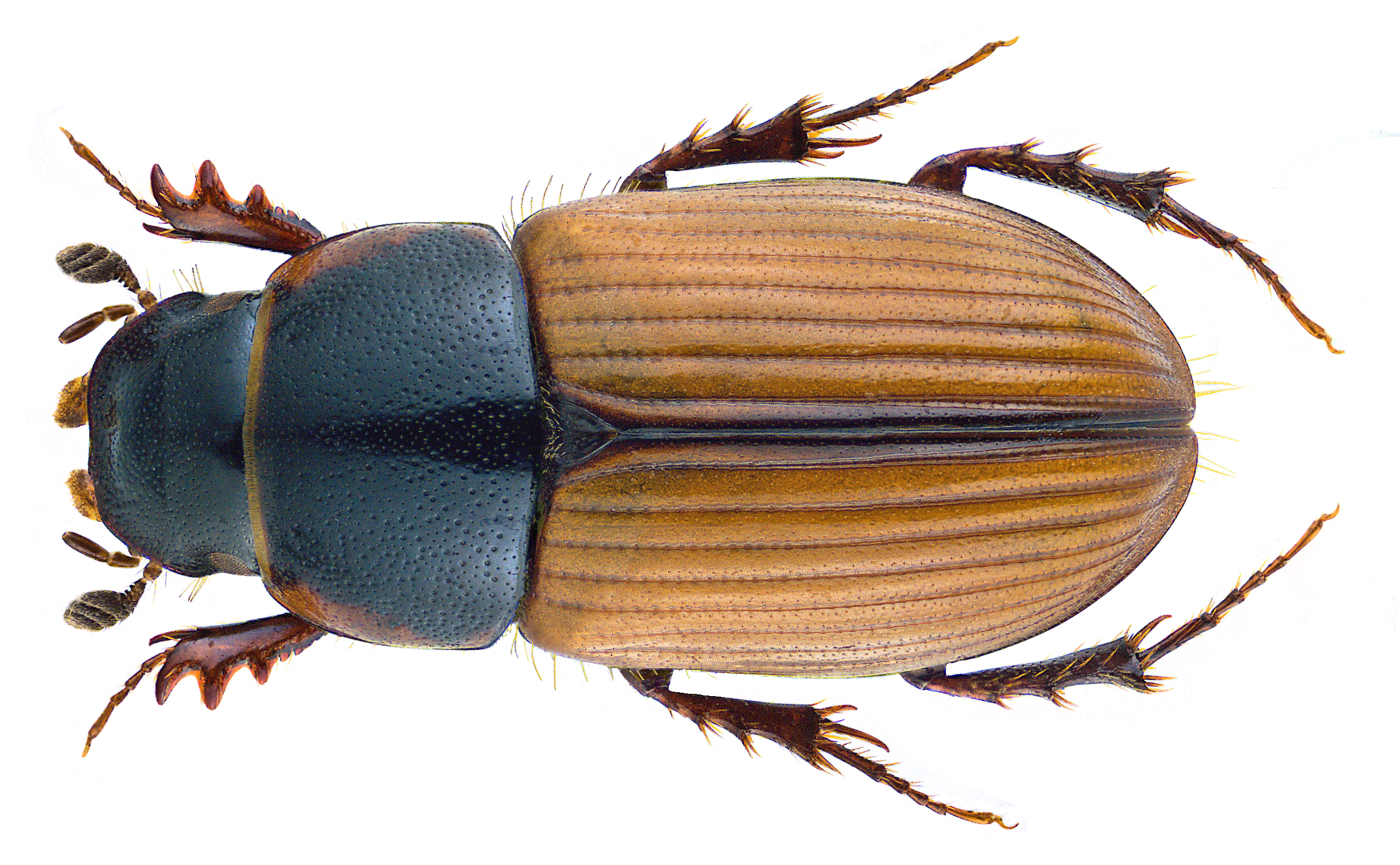
- Esymus merdarius, Turkey

Scientific classification
- Kingdom: Animalia
- Phylum: Arthropoda
- Clade: Pancrustacea
- Class: Insecta
- Order: Coleoptera
- Suborder: Polyphaga
- Infraorder: Scarabaeiformia
- Family: Scarabaeidae
- Subfamily: Aphodiinae
- Tribe: Aphodiini
- Genus: Esymus
- Species: E. merdarius

Binomial name
- Esymus merdarius (Fabricius, 1775)

Synonyms
- Scarabaeus merdarius Fabricius, 1775; Aphodius smetaceki Roubal, 1911; Aphodius merdarius collaris Dalla Torre, 1879; Aphodius merdarius atricollis Mulsant, 1842; Aphodius merdarius melinopus Mulsant, 1842; Aphodius exilis Schmidt, 1840; Scarabaeus fororiorum Panzer, 1798; Scarabaeus gelbinus Schrank, 1798; Scarabaeus quisquilius Schrank, 1781; Aphodius merdarius (Fabricius, 1775)

= Esymus merdarius =

Species of beetle

Esymus merdarius is a species of scarab beetle found in the Palearctic, where it has been recorded from Albania, Algeria, Armenia, Austria, Belarus, Belgium, Bosnia Herzegovina, Bulgaria, Croatia, the Czech Republic, Denmark, Estonia, Finland, France, Georgia, Germany, Great Britain, Greece (Crete), Hungary, Iran, Iraq, Ireland, Israel, Italy, Kyrgyzstan, Latvia, Lithuania, Luxembourg, Macedonia, Montenegro, Moldova, Morocco, the Netherlands, Norway, Poland, Portugal, Romania, Russia, Serbia, Siberia, Slovakia, Slovenia, Spain, Sweden, Switzerland, Turkey, Turkmenistan and Ukraine.

== Description ==
Adults reach a length of about 4–5 mm (0.16–0.20 in). They have an oval-elongate, feebly convex, moderately shiny, glabrous body. The head and pronotum are blackish, the latter with testaceous fore angles. The elytra are orange with a blackish sutural margin.

== Taxonomy ==
The species was formerly a member of the genus Aphodius.
