= List of data deficient arthropods =

- Extinct in the wild (EW): 2 species
- Critically endangered (CR): 850 species
- Endangered (EN): 1,531 species
- Vulnerable (VU): 1,574 species
- Near threatened (NT, LR/cd): 1,118 species
- Least concern (LC): 8,632 species
- Data deficient (DD): 4,643 species
Arthropod species (IUCN, 2025-2)
- 18431 extant species have been evaluated
- 13788 of those are fully assessed (Note: excludes data deficient evaluations.)
- 9750 are not threatened at present
- 4223 to 8866 are threatened (Note: Threatened comprises CR, EN and VU. Upper estimate additionally includes DD.)
- 83 to 261 are extinct or extinct in the wild:
  - 81 extinct (EX) species (Note: Chart omits extinct (EX) species)
  - 2 extinct in the wild (EW)
  - 171 possibly extinct [CR(PE)]
  - 1 possibly extinct in the wild [CR(PEW)]

As of July 2016, the International Union for Conservation of Nature (IUCN) lists 2875 data deficient arthropod species. Thirty percent of all evaluated arthropod species are listed as data deficient. The IUCN also lists 17 arthropod subspecies as data deficient.

No subpopulations of arthropods have been evaluated by the IUCN.

This is a complete list of data deficient arthropod species and subspecies as evaluated by the IUCN.

== Arachnids ==
- Key gnaphosid spider (Cesonia irvingi)
- Torreya trap-door spider (Cyclocosmia torreya)
- Rosemary wolf spider (Lycosa ericeticola)
- Macrothele cretica
- Tooth Cave spider (Neoleptoneta myopica)
- Anantagiri's parachute spider (Poecilotheria tigrinawesseli)
- Secozomus latipes
- Nelson cave spider (Spelungula cavernicola)
- Tooth Cave pseudoscorpion (Tartarocreagris texana)

== Branchiopoda ==
- Streptocephalus kargesi

== Millipedes ==
- Doratogonus bilobatus
- Doratogonus circulus
- Doratogonus liberatus
- Doratogonus praealtus
- Doratogonus stephensi
- Doratogonus subpartitus
- Doratogonus transvaalensis

== Maxillopoda ==
Maxillopoda includes barnacles, copepods and a number of related animals. There are 22 species in the class Maxillopoda assessed as data deficient.

=== Sessilia ===
- Armatobalanus nefrens
- Balanus aquila

=== Calanoida ===
There are 19 species in the order Calanoida assessed as data deficient.

==== Diaptomids ====
- Argyrodiaptomus neglectus
- Diaptomus rostripes
- Eudiaptomus chappuisi
- Hemidiaptomus kummerloewei
- Idiodiaptomus gracilipes
- Mastigodiaptomus amatitlanensis
- Mastigodiaptomus montezumae
- Neutrodiaptomus formosus
- Odontodiaptomus thomseni
- Onychodiaptomus louisianensis
- Skistodiaptomus bogalusensis
- Skistodiaptomus sinuatus
- Spelaeodiaptomus rouchi
- Tropodiaptomus falcatus
- Tropodiaptomus madagascariensis
- Tropodiaptomus palustris
- Tropodiaptomus purpureus
- Tropodiaptomus worthingtoni

==== Temorids ====
- Epischura massachusettsensis

=== Harpacticoida ===
- Thermomesochra reducta

== Xiphosura ==
- Mangrove horseshoe crab (Carcinoscorpius rotundicauda)
- Indian horseshoe crab (Tachypelus gigas)

== Malacostracans ==
Malacostraca includes crabs, lobsters, crayfish, shrimp, krill, woodlice, and many others. There are 1130 malacostracan species and 17 malacostracan subspecies assessed as data deficient.

=== Isopods ===
- Echinodillo cavaticus
- Styloniscus sp. nov.

=== Decapods ===
There are 1128 decapod species and 17 decapod subspecies assessed as data deficient.

==== Parastacids ====
- Astacoides crosnieri
- Astacoides hobbsi
- Madagascar freshwater crayfish (Astacoides madagascarensis)
- Astacoides petiti
- Cherax boesemani
- Cherax holthuisi
- Cherax lorentzi
- Cherax monticola
- Cherax nucifraga
- Cherax parvus
- Cherax peknyi
- Cherax urospinosus
- Engaeus affinis
- Engaeus curvisuturus
- Engaeus karnanga
- Engaeus laevis
- Engaeus nulloporius
- Murray crayfish (Euastacus armatus)
- Ombrastacoides ingressus
- Ombrastacoides professorum
- Parastacus defossus
- Parastacus laevigatus
- Parastacus nicoleti
- Parastacus pugnax
- Parastacus saffordi
- Parastacus varicosus
- River crayfish from the south (Samastacus spinifrons)
- Virilastacus araucanius
- Virilastacus retamali
- Virilastacus rucapihuelensis

==== Gecarcinucids ====
- Adeleana sumatrensis
- Austrothelphusa insularis
- Bakousa hendersoniana
- Bakousa kenepai
- Balssiathelphusa natunaensis
- Balssiathelphusa sucki
- Baratha peena
- Baratha pushta
- Coccusa adipis
- Coccusa isophallus
- Esanthelphusa nani
- Esanthelphusa prolatus
- Gecarcinucus edwardsi
- Geelvinkia ambaiana
- Geelvinkia calmani
- Geelvinkia holthuisi
- Globitelphusa bakeri
- Globitelphusa cylindra
- Globitelphusa pistorica
- Globitelphusa planifrons
- Gubernatoriana escheri
- Gubernatoriana gubernatoris
- Gubernatoriana pilosipes
- Guinothusa beauvoisi
- Guinothusa harmandi
- Guinothusa phimaiensis
- Holthuisana beauforti
- Holthuisana briggsi
- Holthuisana festiva
- Holthuisana loriae
- Holthuisana vanheurni
- Holthuisana wollastoni
- Inglethelphusa fronto
- Liotelphusa campestris
- Liotelphusa wuermlii
- Maydelliathelphusa falcidigitis
- Mekhongthelphusa neisi
- Oziothelphusa aurantia
- Oziothelphusa bouvieri
- Oziothelphusa kerala
- Parathelphusa baweanensis
- Parathelphusa ceophallus
- Parathelphusa convexa
- Parathelphusa linduensis
- Parathelphusa lombokensis
- Parathelphusa mindoro
- Parathelphusa modiglianii
- Parathelphusa nana
- Parathelphusa nitida
- Parathelphusa obtusa
- Parathelphusa palawanensis
- Parathelphusa parma
- Parathelphusa quadrata
- Parathelphusa sabari
- Parathelphusa saginata
- Parathelphusa sarawakensis
- Parathelphusa shelfordi
- Parathelphusa tenuipes
- Parathelphusa tera
- Parathelphusa torta
- Parathelphusa tridentata
- Parathelphusa undulata
- Perithelphusa buettikoferi
- Perithelphusa rouxi
- Phricotelphusa aedes
- Phricotelphusa carinifera
- Pilarta anuka
- Rouxana ingrami
- Rouxana minima
- Rouxana papuana
- Rouxana phreatica
- Rouxana plana
- Rouxana roushdyi
- Rouxana wakipensis
- Sartoriana afghaniensis
- Sartoriana rokitanskyi
- Sartoriana trilobata
- Sendleria genuitei
- Sendleria gjellerupi
- Sendleria gloriosa
- Sendleria salomonis
- Siamthelphusa faxoni
- Siamthelphusa nan
- Snaha aruna
- Snaha escheri
- Somanniathelphusa amoyensis
- Somanniathelphusa araeochela
- Somanniathelphusa bawangensis
- Somanniathelphusa boyangensis
- Somanniathelphusa falx
- Somanniathelphusa guilinensis
- Somanniathelphusa hainanensis
- Somanniathelphusa huaanensis
- Somanniathelphusa huanglungensis
- Somanniathelphusa kyphuensis
- Somanniathelphusa lacuvita
- Somanniathelphusa linchuanensis
- Somanniathelphusa longicaudus
- Somanniathelphusa megachela
- Somanniathelphusa nanningensis
- Somanniathelphusa qiongshanensis
- Somanniathelphusa ruijinensis
- Somanniathelphusa sinensis
- Somanniathelphusa tongzhaensis
- Somanniathelphusa triangularis
- Somanniathelphusa yangshanensis
- Somanniathelphusa yuilinensis
- Somanniathelphusa zhangpuensis
- Somanniathelphusa zhapoensis
- Somanniathelphusa zhongshiensis
- Spiralothelphusa wuellerstorfi
- Stygothelphusa nobilii
- Sundathelphusa antipoloensis
- Sundathelphusa aruana
- Sundathelphusa celer
- Sundathelphusa halmaherensis
- Sundathelphusa jagori
- Sundathelphusa leschenaultii
- Sundathelphusa longipes
- Sundathelphusa mistio
- Sundathelphusa montana
- Sundathelphusa montanoanus
- Sundathelphusa philippina
- Sundathelphusa picta
- Sundathelphusa subquadratus
- Sundathelphusa sutteri
- Sundathelphusa wolterecki
- Terrathelphusa chilensis
- Terrathelphusa telur
- Thelphusula buergeri
- Torhusa nieuwenhuisi
- Travancoriana charu
- Travancoriana kuleera
- Travancoriana napaea
- Travancoriana pollicaris
- Vanni ashini
- Vanni deepta
- Vanni giri
- Vanni malabarica
- Vanni nilgiriensis
- Vanni pusilla
- Vanni travancorica
- Vela carli
- Vela pulvinata
- Vela virupa

==== Atyids ====
Species

- Atya abelei
- Atya limnetes
- Atyaephyra tuerkayi
- Atydina atyoides
- Atyella longirostris
- Caridina africana
- Caridina alba
- Caridina amnicolizambezi
- Caridina amoyensis
- Caridina angustipes
- Caridina aruensis
- Caridina bamaensis
- Caridina baojingensis
- Caridina belazoniensis
- Caridina brevispina
- Caridina buergersi
- Caridina buhi
- Caridina burmensis
- Caridina caobangensis
- Caridina carli
- Caridina cavaleriei
- Caridina cavalerieioides
- Caridina cebuensis
- Caridina celestinoi
- Caridina clavipes
- Caridina clinata
- Caridina congoensis
- Caridina cornuta
- Caridina crassipes
- Caridina crurispinata
- Caridina cucphuongensis
- Caridina curta
- Caridina dentifrons
- Caridina devaneyi
- Caridina disjuncta
- Caridina ebuneus
- Caridina edulis
- Caridina elisabethae
- Caridina elliptica
- Caridina excavata
- Caridina fecunda
- Caridina flavilineata
- Caridina gabonensis
- Caridina ghanensis
- Caridina glossopoda
- Caridina gueryi
- Caridina guiyangensis
- Caridina gurneyi
- Caridina hainanensis
- Caridina hodgarti
- Caridina hongyanensis
- Caridina huananensis
- Caridina hubeiensis
- Caridina hunanensis
- Caridina jeani
- Caridina jiangxiensis
- Caridina kaombeflutilis
- Caridina kilimae
- Caridina kunmingensis
- Caridina laevis
- Caridina lamiana
- Caridina lanzana
- Caridina leytensis
- Caridina liangi
- Caridina liaoi
- Caridina lima
- Caridina lineorostris
- Caridina lipalmaria
- Caridina liui
- Caridina lobocensis
- Caridina longa
- Caridina longiacuta
- Caridina longicarpus
- Caridina longifrons
- Caridina lovoensis
- Caridina lufengensis
- Caridina lumilympha
- Caridina macrodentata
- Caridina macrophora
- Caridina malawensis
- Caridina mathiassi
- Caridina mengaeoides
- Caridina menghaiensis
- Caridina messofluminis
- Caridina minnanica
- Caridina modiglianii
- Caridina mongziensis
- Caridina nanaoensis
- Caridina nguyeni
- Caridina norvestica
- Caridina nudirostris
- Caridina okiamnis
- Caridina okinawa
- Caridina oligospina
- Caridina opaensis
- Caridina palawanensis
- Caridina panikkari
- Caridina paracornuta
- Caridina parvirostris
- Caridina parvocula
- Caridina paucidentata
- Caridina pedicultrata
- Caridina petiti
- Caridina pingioides
- Caridina plicata
- Caridina pseudoserrata
- Caridina qingyuanensis
- Caridina rajadhari
- Caridina rangoona
- Caridina roubaudi
- Caridina rouxi
- Caridina rubropunctata
- Caridina shilinica
- Caridina solearipes
- Caridina songtaoensis
- Caridina sphyrapoda
- Caridina spinalifrons
- Caridina spinipoda
- Caridina spinosipes
- Caridina steineri
- Caridina sumatianica
- Caridina sundanella
- Caridina susuroflabra
- Caridina thomasi
- Caridina timorensis
- Caridina tonkinensis
- Caridina troglodytes
- Caridina troglophila
- Caridina uminensis
- Caridina umtatensis
- Caridina unca
- Caridina venusta
- Caridina vietriensis
- Caridina vithuraensis
- Caridina vitiensis
- Caridina williamsi
- Caridina wumingensis
- Caridina wyckii
- Caridina xiangnanensis
- Caridina yulinica
- Caridina zhejiangensis
- Caridina zhongshanica
- Jolivetya foresti
- Limnocaridella alberti
- Mancicaris sinensis
- Monsamnis carpolongus
- Neocaridina anhuiensis
- Neocaridina bamana
- Neocaridina curvifrons
- Neocaridina euspinosa
- Neocaridina heteropoda
- Neocaridina homospina
- Neocaridina ketagalan
- Neocaridina keunbaei
- Neocaridina linfenensis
- Neocaridina longipoda
- Neocaridina saccam
- Neocaridina xiapuensis
- Neocaridina zhangjiajiensis
- Neocaridina zhoushanensis
- Paracaridina chenxiensis
- Paracaridina zijinica
- Paratya annamensis
- Paratya borealis
- Paratya martensi
- Parisia dentata
- Parisia edentata
- Parisia holthuisi
- Parisia macrophthalma
- Parisia microphthalma
- Potimirim americana
- Potimirim mexicana
- Pycnisia bunyip
- Pycnisia raptor
- Sinodina angulata
- Sinodina banna
- Sinodina dianica
- Sinodina heterodactyla
- Sinodina leptopropoda
- Sinodina lijiang
- Sinodina wangtai
- Sinodina yongshengica
- Troglocaris ablaskiri
- Troglocaris fagei
- Troglocaris jusbaschjani
- Troglocaris kutaissiana
- Troglocaris osterloffi
- Typhlopatsa pauliani

Subspecies

- Caridina babaulti babaulti
- Caridina babaultioides angustifolia
- Caridina babaultioides emeica
- Caridina babaultioides phyllopoda
- Caridina cavaleriei cavaleriei
- Caridina cavaleriei industana
- Caridina indistincta sobrina
- Neocaridina denticulata davidi
- Neocaridina denticulata moganica
- Neocaridina heteropoda heteropoda
- Neocaridina heteropoda koreana
- Neocaridina heteropoda luoyangensis
- Neocaridina palmata bosensis
- Neocaridina palmata luodianica

==== Cambarids ====
- Bayou Bodcau crayfish (Bouchardina robisoni)
- Cypress crayfish (Cambarellus blacki)
- Least crayfish (Cambarellus diminutus)
- Fontal dwarf crayfish (Cambarellus schmitti)
- Cambaroides dauricus
- Zarigani (Cambaroides japonicus)
- Cambaroides schrenckii
- Cambaroides similis
- Shortfinger crayfish (Cambarus brachydactylus)
- Valley river crayfish (Cambarus brimleyorum)
- Greensboro burrowing crayfish (Cambarus catagius)
- Mountain crayfish (Cambarus conasaugaensis)
- Dougherty burrowing crayfish (Cambarus doughertyensis)
- Chickamauga crayfish (Cambarus extraneus)
- Etowah crayfish (Cambarus fasciatus)
- Salem cave crayfish (Cambarus hubrichti)
- Spiny scale crayfish (Cambarus jezerinaci)
- Hiwassee headwaters crayfish (Cambarus parrishi)
- Pristine crayfish (Cambarus pristinus)
- Fireback crayfish (Cambarus pyronotus)
- Broad river spiny crayfish (Cambarus spicatus)
- Lean crayfish (Cambarus strigosus)
- Big sandy crayfish (Cambarus veteranus)
- Mimic crayfish (Distocambarus carlsoni)
- Piedmont prairie burrowing crayfish (Distocambarus crockeri)
- Broad river burrowing crayfish (Distocambarus devexus)
- Burrowing bog crayfish (Fallicambarus burrisi)
- Pine Hills digger (Fallicambarus dissitus)
- Ouachita mountain crayfish (Fallicambarus tenuis)
- Pearl riverlet crayfish (Hobbseus attenuatus)
- Crested riverlet crayfish (Hobbseus cristatus)
- Tombigbee riverlet crayfish (Hobbseus petilus)
- Cumberland plateau cave crayfish (Orconectes barri)
- Pontchartrain painted crayfish (Orconectes hobbsi)
- Bimaculate crayfish (Orconectes holti)
- Sucarnoochee river crayfish (Orconectes jonesi)
- Kisatchie painted crayfish (Orconectes maletae)
- Mississippi crayfish (Orconectes mississippiensis)
- Orconectes quinebaugensis
- Sinkhole crayfish (Orconectes theaphionensis)
- Chowanoke crayfish (Orconectes virginiensis)
- Coastal plain crayfish (Procambarus ancylus)
- Procambarus atkinsoni
- Jackson prairie crayfish (Procambarus barbiger)
- Waccamaw crayfish (Procambarus braswelli)
- Capillaceous crayfish (Procambarus capillatus)
- Procambarus chacalli
- Carrollton crayfish (Procambarus connus)
- Procambarus cubensis
- Elegant creek crayfish (Procambarus elegans)
- Procambarus erichsoni
- Panhandle crayfish (Procambarus evermanni)
- Muddiver crayfish (Procambarus geodytes)
- Muckalee crayfish (Procambarus gibbus)
- Wingtail crayfish (Procambarus latipleurum)
- Pee Dee lotic crayfish (Procambarus lepidodactylus)
- Spur crayfish (Procambarus lewisi)
- Blackwater crayfish (Procambarus litosternum)
- Hummock crayfish (Procambarus lunzi)
- Crisscross crayfish (Procambarus marthae)
- Procambarus maya
- Pamlico crayfish (Procambarus medialis)
- Procambarus niveus
- Nueces crayfish (Procambarus nueces)
- Carolina sandhills crayfish (Procambarus pearsei)
- Pearl blackwater crayfish (Procambarus penni)
- Procambarus pentastylus
- Ogeechee crayfish (Procambarus petersi)
- Bearded crayfish (Procambarus pogum)
- Brushnose crayfish (Procambarus pubescens)
- Hookless crayfish (Procambarus pubischelae)
- Stud crayfish (Procambarus pycnogonopodus)
- Disjunct crayfish (Procambarus raneyi)
- Combclaw crayfish (Procambarus rathbunae)
- Regal burrowing crayfish (Procambarus regalis)
- Procambarus reimeri
- Procambarus rodriguezi
- Field crayfish (Procambarus rogersi)
- Procambarus sbordonii
- Parkhill prairie crayfish (Procambarus steigmani)
- Procambarus strenthi
- Bastrop crayfish (Procambarus texanus)
- Procambarus teziutlanensis
- Procambarus tlapacoyanensis
- Procambarus veracruzanus
- Procambarus villalobosi
- Procambarus williamsoni
- Procambarus xilitlae
- Procambarus xochitlanae
- Florida longbeak crayfish (Procambarus youngi)
- Southern white river crayfish (Procambarus zonangulus)

==== Potamonautids ====
- Afrithelphusa afzelii
- Afrithelphusa gerhildae
- Afrithelphusa leonensis
- Erimetopus vandenbrandeni
- Malagasya goodmani
- Marojejy longimerus
- Platythelphusa praelongata
- Potamonautes acristatus
- Potamonautes adeleae
- Potamonautes adentatus
- Potamonautes amalerensis
- Potamonautes bipartitus
- Potamonautes didieri
- Potamonautes dubius
- Kensley's river crab (Potamonautes kensleyi)
- Potamonautes lueboensis
- Potamonautes macrobrachii
- Potamonautes principe
- Potamonautes punctatus
- Potamonautes rodolphianus
- Potamonautes rothschildi
- Potamonautes schubotzi
- Potamonautes semilunaris
- Senegal river crab (Potamonautes senegalensis)
- Potamonemus asylos
- Skelosophusa eumeces
- Skelosophusa gollardi
- Skelosophusa prolixa
- Nigerian stream crab (Sudanonautes nigeria)
- Sudanonautes orthostylis
- Sudanonautes sangha

==== Pseudothelphusids ====
- Brasiliothelphusa tapajoensis
- Camptophallus botti
- Chaceus cesarensis
- Chaceus curumanensis
- Chaceus davidi
- Chaceus motiloni
- Chaceus nasutus
- Disparithelphusa pecki
- Eidocamptophallus chacei
- Elsalvadoria tomhaasi
- Epilobocera capolongoi
- Epithelphusa chiapensis
- Epithelphusa mixtepensis
- Eudaniela casanarensis
- Eudaniela pestai
- Fredius adpressus
- Hypolobocera buenaventurensis
- Hypolobocera canaensis
- Hypolobocera dantae
- Hypolobocera delsolari
- Hypolobocera dentata
- Hypolobocera emberarum
- Hypolobocera esmeraldensis
- Hypolobocera gibberimana
- Hypolobocera guayaquilensis
- Hypolobocera kamsarum
- Hypolobocera konstanzae
- Hypolobocera lamercedes
- Hypolobocera malagena
- Hypolobocera mindonensis
- Hypolobocera muisnensis
- Hypolobocera murindensis
- Hypolobocera mutisi
- Hypolobocera noanamensis
- Hypolobocera orcesi
- Hypolobocera smalleyi
- Hypolobocera solimani
- Hypolobocera steindachneri
- Hypolobocera triangula
- Hypolobocera ucayalensis
- Kingsleya besti
- Kingsleya gustavoi
- Kingsleya junki
- Lindacatalina brevipenis
- Lindacatalina hauserae
- Lindacatalina latipenis
- Lindacatalina puyensis
- Lindacatalina sinuensis
- Lobithelphusa mexicana
- Martiana clausa
- Microthelphusa barinensis
- Microthelphusa bolivari
- Microthelphusa ginesi
- Microthelphusa meansi
- Microthelphusa odaelkae
- Microthelphusa racenisi
- Microthelphusa rodriguezi
- Microthelphusa somanni
- Microthelphusa sucreensis
- Microthelphusa turumikiri
- Microthelphusa viloriai
- Microthelphusa wymani
- Moritschus caucasensis
- Moritschus narinnensis
- Neostrengeria aspera
- Neostrengeria binderi
- Neostrengeria gilberti
- Neostrengeria lemaitrei
- Neostrengeria libradensis
- Neostrengeria lobulata
- Neostrengeria macarenae
- Neostrengeria sketi
- Odontothelphusa lacandona
- Odontothelphusa lacanjaensis
- Odontothelphusa monodontis
- Odontothelphusa palenquensis
- Odontothelphusa toninae
- Oedothelphusa orientalis
- Orthothelphusa roberti
- Phrygiopilus chuacusensis
- Phrygiopilus ibarrai
- Phrygiopilus longipes
- Phrygiopilus montebelloensis
- Phrygiopilus strengerae
- Phrygiopilus yoshibensis
- Potamocarcinus chajulensis
- Potamocarcinus colombiensis
- Potamocarcinus leptomelus
- Potamocarcinus lobulatus
- Potamocarcinus pinzoni
- Potamocarcinus poglayeneuwalli
- Potamocarcinus vulcanensis
- Pseudothelphusa ayutlaensis
- Pseudothelphusa digueti
- Pseudothelphusa doenitzi
- Pseudothelphusa dugesti
- Pseudothelphusa galloi
- Pseudothelphusa granatensis
- Pseudothelphusa hoffmannae
- Pseudothelphusa leiophrys
- Pseudothelphusa lophophallus
- Pseudothelphusa mexicana
- Pseudothelphusa morelosis
- Pseudothelphusa nayaritae
- Pseudothelphusa parabelliana
- Pseudothelphusa peyotensis
- Pseudothelphusa puntarenas
- Pseudothelphusa rechingeri
- Pseudothelphusa seiferti
- Pseudothelphusa sonorae
- Pseudothelphusa terrestris
- Ptychophallus cocleensis
- Ptychophallus costaricaensis
- Ptychophallus goldmanni
- Ptychophallus kuna
- Ptychophallus lavallensis
- Ptychophallus micracanthus
- Ptychophallus montanus
- Ptychophallus osaensis
- Ptychophallus paraxanthusi
- Ptychophallus uncinatus
- Raddaus tuberculatus
- Smalleyus tricristatus
- Spirothelphusa verticalis
- Strengeriana bolivarensis
- Strengeriana cajaensis
- Strengeriana casallasi
- Strengeriana flagellata
- Strengeriana florenciae
- Strengeriana foresti
- Strengeriana huilensis
- Strengeriana taironae
- Strengeriana tolimensis
- Tehuana chontalpaensis
- Tehuana complanata
- Tehuana guerreroensis
- Tehuana jacatepecensis
- Tehuana lamellifrons
- Typhlopseudothelphusa acanthochela
- Typhlopseudothelphusa hyba
- Villalobosus lopezformenti
- Zilchia falcata
- Zilchia ivis

==== Potamids ====
- Acanthopotamon fungosum
- Acanthopotamon panningi
- Acartiapotamon inflatum
- Alcomon superciliosum
- Allopotamon tambelanense
- Amamiku occulta
- Aparapotamon arcuatum
- Aparapotamon emineoforaminum
- Aparapotamon gracillipedum
- Aparapotamon huiliense
- Aparapotamon inflomanum
- Aparapotamon molarum
- Aparapotamon muliense
- Aparapotamon protinum
- Aparapotamon similium
- Aparapotamon tholosum
- Apotamonautes hainanensis
- Artopotamon compressum
- Aspermon feae
- Badistemon turgidulum
- Balssipotamon fruhstorferi
- Balssipotamon ungulatum
- Beccumon alcockianum
- Beccumon jarujini
- Beccumon maesariang
- Beccumon namlang
- Bottapotamon engelhardti
- Bottapotamon lingchuanense
- Bottapotamon yonganense
- Candidiopotamon guangdongense
- Carpomon pomulum
- Chinapotamon anlongense
- Chinapotamon glabrum
- Chinapotamon longlingense
- Chinapotamon pusillum
- Chinapotamon xingrenense
- Dalatomon laevior
- Dalatomon loxophrys
- Demanietta manii
- Demanietta merguensis
- Demanietta thagatensis
- Doimon maehongsonense
- Dromothelphusa longipes
- Eosamon brousmichei
- Eosamon hafniense
- Eosamon lushuiense
- Eosamon nominathuis
- Eosamon paludosum
- Eosamon phuphanense
- Eosamon tengchonense
- Eosamon tumidum
- Eosamon yotdomense
- Esanpotamon namsom
- Flabellamon kuehnelti
- Qiu Shi Ze crab (Geothelphusa chiui)
- Ze significant tooth crab (Geothelphusa eucrinodonta)
- Wide-taek crab (Geothelphusa eurysoma)
- Rust colored crab (Geothelphusa ferruginea)
- Fine Ashisawa crab (Geothelphusa gracilipes)
- To Lanze crab (Geothelphusa ilan)
- Geothelphusa leeae
- Geothelphusa lili
- Geothelphusa marmorata
- Geothelphusa shernshan
- Tali crab (Geothelphusa tali)
- Wu Ze large crab (Geothelphusa tawu)
- Hainanpotamon auriculatum
- Hainanpotamon daiae
- Hainanpotamon directum
- Hainanpotamon fuchengense
- Hainanpotamon globosum
- Hainanpotamon helense
- Heterochelamon guangxiense
- Heterochelamon purpureomanualis
- Heterochelamon yangshuoense
- Himalayapotamon ambivium
- Himalayapotamon babaulti
- Himalayapotamon bifarium
- Himalayapotamon kausalis
- Himalayapotamon marinelli
- Himalayapotamon monticola
- Huananpotamon angulatum
- Huananpotamon chongrenense
- Huananpotamon guixiense
- Huananpotamon lichuanense
- Huananpotamon medium
- Huananpotamon nanchengense
- Huananpotamon obtusum
- Huananpotamon planopodum
- Huananpotamon ramipodum
- Huananpotamon ruijinense
- Huananpotamon yiyangense
- Ibanum bicristatum
- Indochinamon andersonianum
- Indochinamon asperatum
- Indochinamon beieri
- Indochinamon boshanense
- Indochinamon changpoense
- Indochinamon chinghungense
- Indochinamon daweishanense
- Indochinamon edwardsi
- Indochinamon flexum
- Indochinamon gengmaense
- Indochinamon hirtum
- Indochinamon hispidum
- Indochinamon jianchuanense
- Indochinamon jinpingense
- Indochinamon kimboiense
- Indochinamon lipkei
- Indochinamon manipurense
- Indochinamon mengalaense
- Indochinamon orleansi
- Indochinamon ou
- Indochinamon prolatum
- Indochinamon tannanti
- Indochinamon tritum
- Indochinamon xinpingense
- Indochinamon yunlongense
- Inlethelphusa acanthica
- Insulamon unicorn
- Isolapotamon beeliae
- Isolapotamon borneensis
- Isolapotamon doriae
- Isolapotamon grusophallus
- Isolapotamon mahakkamense
- Isolapotamon mindanaoense
- Isolapotamon naiadis
- Isolapotamon sinuatifrons
- Isolapotamon spatha
- Isolapotamon stuebingi
- Johora aipooae
- Kanpotamon duangkhaei
- Kanpotamon simulum
- Kukrimon cucphuongense
- Lacunipotamon albusorbitum
- Laevimon kottelati
- Laevimon tankiense
- Larnaudia beusekomae
- Larnaudia larnaudii
- Latopotamon obtortum
- Latopotamon qujingense
- Latopotamon xuanweiense
- Lobothelphusa barbouri
- Lobothelphusa calva
- Lobothelphusa crenulifera
- Lobothelphusa floccosa
- Lophopotamon yenyuanense
- Malayopotamon gestroi
- Malayopotamon granulosum
- Malayopotamon javanense
- Malayopotamon similis
- Malayopotamon sumatrense
- Malayopotamon tobaense
- Malayopotamon turgeo
- Mediapotamon angustipedum
- Megacephalomon kittikooni
- Mindoron balssi
- Mindoron pala
- Minpotamon nasicum
- Nanhaipotamon aculatum
- Nanhaipotamon guangdongense
- Nanhaipotamon hepingense
- Nanhaipotamon huaanense
- Nanhaipotamon nanriense
- Nanhaipotamon pinghense
- Nanhaipotamon pingyuanense
- Nanhaipotamon wenzhouense
- Nanhaipotamon yongchuense
- Neilupotamon papilionaceum
- Neilupotamon sinense
- Neilupotamon xinganense
- Neolarnaudia botti
- Neolarnaudia phymatodes
- Neotiwaripotamon jianfengense
- Neotiwaripotamon whiteheadi
- Ovitamon arcanum
- Ovitamon cumingii
- Ovitamon tomaculum
- Parapotamon hsingyiense
- Parapotamonoides endymion
- Pararanguna semilunatum
- Paratelphusula burmensis
- Paratelphusula dayana
- Paratelphusula gibbosa
- Paratelphusula peguensis
- Parvuspotamon yuxiense
- Pilosamon laosense
- Pilosamon palustre
- Planumon cochinchinense
- Potamiscus annandalii
- Potamiscus cangyuanensis
- Potamiscus decourcyi
- Potamiscus loshingense
- Potamiscus montosus
- Potamiscus motuoense
- Potamiscus pealianus
- Potamiscus rangoonense
- Potamiscus rongjingense
- Potamiscus yiwuensis
- Potamiscus yongshengense
- Potamiscus yunnanense
- Pudaengon arnamicai
- Pudaengon hinpoon
- Pudaengon inornatum
- Pudaengon khammouan
- Pudaengon mukdahan
- Pudaengon sakonnakorn
- Pudaengon thatphanom
- Pudaengon wanonniwat
- Pupamon lao
- Pupamon namuan
- Pupamon nayung
- Pupamon pealianoides
- Pupamon prabang
- Pupamon sangwan
- Qiangpotamon wulingense
- Quadramon aborense
- Quadramon mooleyitensis
- Quadramon obliteratum
- Rathbunamon lacunifer
- Setosamon somchaii
- Setosamon ubon
- Shanphusa browneana
- Shanphusa curtobates
- Sinopotamon anhuiense
- Sinopotamon baiyanense
- Sinopotamon chalingense
- Sinopotamon changanense
- Sinopotamon chengkuense
- Sinopotamon cochlearidigitum
- Sinopotamon emeiense
- Sinopotamon fukienense
- Sinopotamon fuxingense
- Sinopotamon gaocuense
- Sinopotamon introdigitum
- Sinopotamon jiangxianense
- Sinopotamon kenliense
- Sinopotamon koatenense
- Sinopotamon lingxianense
- Sinopotamon linhuaense
- Sinopotamon liuyangense
- Sinopotamon longlinense
- Sinopotamon loudiense
- Sinopotamon mayangense
- Sinopotamon ningganense
- Sinopotamon parvum
- Sinopotamon pingshanense
- Sinopotamon quadratapodum
- Sinopotamon rongshuiense
- Sinopotamon shaoyangense
- Sinopotamon siguqiaoense
- Sinopotamon taoyuanense
- Sinopotamon tinghsiangense
- Sinopotamon turgidum
- Sinopotamon unaequum
- Sinopotamon weiyuanense
- Sinopotamon wushanense
- Sinopotamon xiangtanense
- Sinopotamon xingningense
- Sinopotamon xiuningense
- Sinopotamon xiushuiense
- Sinopotamon yichangense
- Sinopotamon yixianense
- Sinopotamon yonganense
- Sinopotamon yueyangense
- Sinopotamon yushanense
- Sinopotamon zunyiense
- Socotrapotamon nojidensis
- Stelomon tharnlod
- Stelomon turgidulimanus
- Takpotamon galyaniae
- Takpotamon maesotense
- Tenuilapotamon inflexum
- Tenuilapotamon joshuiense
- Tenuipotamon baishuiense
- Tenuipotamon huaningense
- Tenuipotamon panxiense
- Tenuipotamon purpura
- Tenuipotamon tonghaiense
- Tenuipotamon xinpingense
- Tenuipotamon yuxiense
- Teretamon adiatretum
- Thaiphusa chantaburiensis
- Thaiphusa tenasserimensis
- Thaipotamon holthuisi
- Thaipotamon siamense
- Thaipotamon smitinandi
- Thaipotamon varoonphornae
- Tiwaripotamon araneum
- Tiwaripotamon austenianum
- Tiwaripotamon pingguoense
- Tiwaripotamon vietnamicum
- Tiwaripotamon xiurenense
- Tomaculamon pygmaeus
- Tomaculamon stenixys
- Trichopotamon daliense
- Trichopotamon xiangyunense
- Vadosapotamon sheni
- Vietopotamon aluoiense
- Vietopotamon phuluangense
- Villopotamon guangdongense
- Villopotamon klossianum
- Villopotamon sphaeridium
- Villopotamon thaii
- Yarepotamon aflagellum
- Yarepotamon breviflagellum
- Yarepotamon gracillipa
- Yarepotamon guangdongense

==== Palaemonids ====
Species

- Cryphiops sbordonii
- Cryphiops villalobosi
- Exopalaemon mani
- Exopalaemon xinjiangensis
- Leptocarpus kempi
- Macrobrachium agwi
- Macrobrachium andamanicum
- Macrobrachium atabapense
- Macrobrachium banjarae
- Macrobrachium brevicarpum
- Macrobrachium cacharense
- Macrobrachium canarae
- Macrobrachium cocoense
- Macrobrachium cosolapaense
- Macrobrachium cowlesi
- Macrobrachium crebrum
- Macrobrachium dierythrum
- Macrobrachium digitus
- Macrobrachium dolatum
- Macrobrachium edentatum
- Macrobrachium elatum
- Macrobrachium felicinum
- Macrobrachium foai
- Macrobrachium fukienense
- Macrobrachium glabrum
- Macrobrachium gua
- Macrobrachium guangxiense
- Macrobrachium heterorhynchos
- Macrobrachium hildebrandti
- Macrobrachium hungi
- Macrobrachium inca
- Macrobrachium inflatum
- Macrobrachium insulare
- Macrobrachium jacatepecense
- Macrobrachium jacobsoni
- Macrobrachium jayasreei
- Macrobrachium jiangxiense
- Macrobrachium johnsoni
- Macrobrachium joppae
- Macrobrachium kempi
- Macrobrachium kulkarnii
- Macrobrachium kunjuramani
- Macrobrachium lujae
- Macrobrachium madhusoodani
- Macrobrachium manipurense
- Macrobrachium meridionale
- Macrobrachium miyakoense
- Macrobrachium nepalense
- Macrobrachium oaxacae
- Macrobrachium oenone
- Macrobrachium pectinatum
- Macrobrachium pentazona
- Macrobrachium petiti
- Macrobrachium pilosum
- Macrobrachium prabhakarani
- Macrobrachium praecox
- Macrobrachium pumilum
- Macrobrachium quelchi
- Macrobrachium raridens
- Macrobrachium rogersi
- Macrobrachium rostratum
- Macrobrachium santanderensis
- Macrobrachium shaoi
- Macrobrachium srilankense
- Macrobrachium striatum
- Macrobrachium sulcicarpale
- Macrobrachium tenuirostrum
- Macrobrachium therezieni
- Macrobrachium thuylami
- Macrobrachium thysi
- Macrobrachium transandicum
- Macrobrachium trichodactylum
- Macrobrachium unikarnatakae
- Macrobrachium veliense
- Macrobrachium vietnamiense
- Macrobrachium walvanense
- Macrobrachium wannanense
- Macrobrachium zariquieyi
- Neopalaemon nahuatlus
- Palaemonetes mesogenitor
- Palaemonetes texanus
- Palaemonetes turcorum
- Pseudopalaemon funchiae
- Pseudopalaemon iquitoensis
- Tenuipedium palaemonoides
- Troglindicus phreaticus
- Troglocubanus jamaicensis
- Troglomexicanus huastecae
- Troglomexicanus perezfarfanteae
- Troglomexicanus tamaulipasensis

Subspecies

- Macrobrachium altifrons ranjhai
- Macrobrachium assamense peninsulare
- Macrobrachium malcolmsonii kotreeanum

==== Trichodactylids ====
- Dilocarcinus truncatus
- Fredilocarcinus apyratii
- Fredilocarcinus raddai
- Melocarcinus meekei
- Rodriguezia mensabak
- Rodriguezia villalobosi
- Trichodactylus parvus
- Zilchiopsis cryptodus

==== Spiny lobsters ====
- Jasus caveorum
- Juan Fernandez rock lobster (Jasus frontalis)
- St Paul rock lobster (Jasus paulensis)
- West Indian furrow lobster (Justitia longimanus)
- Small furrow lobster (Nupalirus chani)
- Polynesian furrow lobster (Nupalirus vericeli)
- Musical furry lobster (Palibythus magnificus)
- Palinurus barbarae
- Palinustus holthuisi
- Buffalo blunthorn lobster (Palinustus mossamicus)
- Caribbean spiny lobster (Panulirus argus)
- Panulirus brunneiflagellum
- Green spiny lobster (Panulirus gracilis)
- Japanese spiny lobster (Panulirus japonicus)
- Smoothtail spiny lobster (Panulirus laevicauda)
- Banded spiny lobster (Panulirus marginatus)
- Easter Island spiny lobster (Panulirus pascuensis)
- Royal spiny lobster (Panulirus regius)
- Chinese spiny lobster (Panulirus stimpsoni)
- Red whip lobster (Puerulus carinatus)

==== Lobsters ====
- Red lobster (Eunephrops bairdii)
- Eunephrops luckhursti
- Banded lobster (Eunephrops manningi)
- Cape lobster (Homarinus capensis)
- Arafura lobster (Metanephrops arafurensis)
- Armoured lobster (Metanephrops armatus)
- Formosa lobster (Metanephrops formosanus)
- Japanese lobster (Metanephrops japonicus)
- Urugavian lobster (Metanephrops rubellus)
- Sculpted lobster (Metanephrops sagamiensis)
- Red-banded lobster (Metanephrops taiwanicus)
- Metanephrops thomsoni
- Mitten lobsterette (Nephropides caribaeus)
- Nephropsis holthuisi
- Saya de Malha lobsterette (Nephropsis malhaensis)
- Nephropsis serrata
- Thaumastochelopsis brucei
- Australian pincer lobster (Thaumastochelopsis wardi)
- Thymopides laurentae

==== Slipper lobsters ====
- Acantharctus delfini
- Acantharctus posteli
- Bathyarctus formosanus
- Bathyarctus ramosae
- Bathyarctus steatopygus
- Biarctus dubius
- Chelarctus crosnieri
- Eduarctus lewinsohni
- Eduarctus marginatus
- Eduarctus perspicillatus
- Galearctus rapanus
- Galearctus umbilicatus
- Japanese fan lobster (Ibacus ciliatus)
- Ibacus pubescens
- Red-spotted mitten lobster (Parribacus holthuisi)
- Japanese mitten lobster (Parribacus japonicus)
- Easter Island mitten lobster (Parribacus perlatus)
- Marbled mitten lobster (Parribacus scarlatinus)
- Galápagos slipper lobster (Scyllarides astori)
- Three-spot slipper lobster (Scyllarides delfosi)
- Red slipper lobster (Scyllarides herklotsii)
- Mediterranean slipper lobster (Scyllarides latus)
- Scyllarides obtusus
- Easter Island slipper lobster (Scyllarides roggeveeni)
- Scyllarus paradoxus
- Scyllarus planorbis
- Scyllarus subarctus
- Sandbug (Thenus australiensis)
- Mud bug (Thenus indicus)
- Thenus parindicus
- Thenus unimaculatus

==== Reef lobsters ====
- Enoplometopus callistus
- Enoplometopus chacei
- Enoplometopus crosnieri
- Striped reef lobster (Enoplometopus daumi)
- Violet-spotted reef lobster (Enoplometopus debelius)
- Enoplometopus gracilipes
- Bullseye reef lobster (Enoplometopus holthuisi)
- Enoplometopus macrodontus
- Enoplometopus pictus
- Enoplometopus voigtmanni

==== Other decapod species ====
- Thick-clawed crayfish (Astacus pachypus))
- Euryrhynchoides holthuisi
- Euryrhynchus tomasi
- Homeryon armarium
- Laurentaeglyphea neocaledonica
- Neoglyphea inopinata
- Snake River pilose crayfish (Pacifastacus connectens)
- Stereomastis alis
- Typhlocaris lethaea
- Willemoesia inornata
- Willemoesia pacifica
- Xiphocaris gomezi

== Insects ==
There are 1702 insect species assessed as data deficient.

=== Blattodea ===
- Miriamrothschildia zonatus

=== Orthoptera ===
There are 50 species in the order Orthoptera assessed as data deficient.

==== Acridids ====
- South-east African burrowing grasshopper (Acrotylus mossambicus)
- Piedmont banded grasshopper (Arcyptera alzonai)
- Hierro rock grasshopper (Arminda hierroensis)
- Kasulu grasshopper (Coryphosima cytidonota)
- Kibariani flightless grasshopper (Eyprepocnemis burtti)
- Malagarasi grasshopper (Eyprepocnemis reducta)
- Oberthür's grasshopper (Gymnobothrus oberthuri)
- Römer's gasshopper (Gymnobothrus roemeri)
- Crivellari's sand grasshopper (Sphingonotus crivellarii)
- Vesey-fitzgerald's mysterious grasshopper (Unalia fitzgeraldi)
- Azam's desert grasshopper (Xerohippus azami)
- Cyprian desert grasshopper (Xerohippus cyprius)
- Small desert grasshopper (Xerohippus sinuosus)

==== Tettigoniids ====
- Brown's shieldback (Alfredectes browni)
- Charpentier's black-winged clonia (Clonia charpentieri)
- Predatory slender clonia (Cloniella praedatoria)
- Grebenchikov's cone-head (Conocephalus grebenchikovi)
- Cederberg shieldback (Namaquadectes irroratus)
- Agiostrati bush-cricket (Rhacocleis agiostratica)
- Uvarov's bush-cricket (Rhacocleis uvarovi)

==== Phaneropterids ====
- Sopatas' black-kneed katydid (Aprosphylus sopatarum)
- Elegant winter katydid (Brinckiella elegans)
- Serrated winter katydid (Brinckiella serricauda)
- Green winter katydid (Brinckiella viridis)
- Belck's dimorphic leaf katydid (Conchotopoda belcki)
- Brunner's dimorphic leaf katydid (Conchotopoda brunneri)
- Rare dimorphic leaf katydid (Conchotopoda crassicauda)
- Zululand dimorphic leaf katydid (Conchotopoda grallatoria)
- Damara dimorphic leaf katydid (Conchotopoda leptocerca)
- Highveld dimorphic leaf katydid (Conchotopoda parva)
- Green ducetia (Ducetia chelocerca)
- Namibian agile katydid (Griffiniana pedestris)
- Spotted leaf katydid (Phaneroptera nigropunctata)
- Poecilimon bifenestratus
- Poecilimon tricuspis
- Angolan lace-winged katydid (Pseudosaga angolensis)
- Dark-edged leaf katydid (Symmetropleura plana)

==== Other Orthoptera species ====
- Kaikoura weta (Deinacrida parva)
- Baccetti's cave-cricket (Dolichopoda baccettii)
- Capri cave-cricket (Dolichopoda capreensis)
- Megalo Spilio cave-cricket (Dolichopoda giachinoi)
- Mucedda's cave-cricket (Dolichopoda muceddai)
- Cretan crevice-cricket (Gryllomorpha cretensis)
- Prairie mole cricket (Gryllotalpa major)
- False stripe-headed cricket (Modicogryllus pseudocyprius)
- Kinzelbach's scale-cricket (Mogoplistes kinzelbachi)
- Myrmecophilus mayaealberti
- Myrmecophilus seychellensis
- Phaloria insularis
- Subtiloria succineus

=== Hymenoptera ===
There are 316 species in the order Hymenoptera assessed as data deficient.

==== Colletids ====
- Colletes dinizi
- Colletes standfussi
- Colletes tardus
- Hylaeus adriaticus
- Hylaeus alpinus
- Hylaeus azorae
- Hylaeus canariensis
- Hylaeus convergens
- Hylaeus deceptorius
- Hylaeus garrulus
- Hylaeus hellenicus
- Hylaeus hohmanni
- Hylaeus hyperpunctatus
- Hylaeus ibericus
- Hylaeus koenigsmanni
- Hylaeus maderensis
- Hylaeus milossus
- Hylaeus nivaliformis
- Hylaeus nivalis
- Hylaeus penalaris
- Hylaeus pictus
- Hylaeus pyrenaicus
- Hylaeus stigmorhinus
- Hylaeus teruelus

==== Melittids ====
- Dasypoda iberica
- Melitta budashkini
- Melitta iberica
- Melitta murciana
- Melitta seitzi
- Melitta tomentosa
- Melitta udmurtica

==== Apids ====
- Ammobatoides okalii
- Anthophora andalusica
- Anthophora balearica
- Anthophora dalmatica
- Anthophora gallica
- Anthophora laevigata
- Anthophora lanzarotensis
- Anthophora lieftincki
- Anthophora nigrovittata
- Anthophora orotavae
- Anthophora porphyrea
- Anthophora pruinosa
- Anthophora pulverosa
- Anthophora punctilabris
- Anthophora purpuraria
- Anthophora senicula
- Anthophora sichelii
- Anthophora thomsoni
- Anthophora uniciliata
- Bombus bellicosus
- Ashton's cuckoo bumblebee (Bombus bohemicus)
- Bombus brasiliensis
- Bombus brevivillus
- Bombus cryptarum
- Great yellow bumblebee (Bombus distinguendus)
- Bombus ecuadorius
- Bombus excellens
- Fernald cuckoo bumble bee (Bombus flavidus)
- Bombus hortulanus
- Bombus jonellus
- Bombus kirbiellus
- Bombus melaleucus
- High Arctic bumble bee (Bombus natvigi)
- Active bumble bee (Bombus neoboreus)
- Polar bumble bee (Bombus polaris)
- Bombus pullatus
- Bombus robustus
- Bombus rohweri
- Bombus rubicundus
- Bombus tucumanus
- Bombus vogti
- Ceratina cypriaca
- Ceratina teunisseni
- Epeolus compar
- Epeolus fasciatus
- Epeolus flavociliatus
- Epeolus intermedius
- Epeolus productulus
- Epeolus siculus
- Epeolus sigillatus
- Epeolus transitorius
- Eucera codinai
- Eucera quilisi
- Habropoda ezonata
- Melecta canariensis
- Melecta caroli
- Melecta curvispina
- Melecta gracilipes
- Nomada alpigena
- Nomada ariasi
- Nomada arrogans
- Nomada barcelonensis
- Nomada bolivari
- Nomada corcyraea
- Nomada cypricola
- Nomada gransassoi
- Nomada gredosiana
- Nomada gruenwaldti
- Nomada hispanica
- Nomada illustris
- Nomada jaramense
- Nomada kornosica
- Nomada kriesteni
- Nomada lamellata
- Nomada mandibularis
- Nomada nesiotica
- Nomada orbitalis
- Nomada polemediana
- Nomada rubricoxa
- Nomada rufoabdominalis
- Nomada sicula
- Nomada standfussi
- Nomada verna
- Tetraloniella hohmanni
- Tetraloniella lanzarotensis
- Tetraloniella lyncea
- Thyreus hohmanni

==== Halictids ====
- Dufourea coeruleocephala
- Dufourea fortunata
- Dufourea iris
- Dufourea longiglossa
- Dufourea lusitanica
- Dufourea merceti
- Dufourea styx
- Dufourea trautmanni
- Halictus centaureae
- Halictus crenicornis
- Halictus fumatipennis
- Halictus gruenwaldti
- Halictus holomelaenus
- Halictus inpilosus
- Halictus jaramielicus
- Halictus lussinicus
- Halictus mediterranellus
- Halictus nicosiae
- Halictus ponticus
- Halictus pseudotetrazonius
- Halictus pyrenaeus
- Halictus quadripartitus
- Halictus rossicus
- Halictus tridivisus
- Lasioglossum akroundicum
- Lasioglossum ariadne
- Lasioglossum aureimontanum
- Lasioglossum castilianum
- Lasioglossum corsicanum
- Lasioglossum danuvium
- Lasioglossum dusmeti
- Lasioglossum eurasicum
- Lasioglossum ibericum
- Lasioglossum kotschyi
- Lasioglossum leucomontanum
- Lasioglossum lissonotum
- Lasioglossum orihuelicum
- Lasioglossum pleurospeculum
- Lasioglossum ragusanum
- Lasioglossum tauricum
- Lasioglossum vergilianum
- Rhophitoides epiroticus
- Rophites hellenicus
- Rophites thracius
- Sphecodes atlanticus
- Sphecodes combai
- Sphecodes creticus
- Sphecodes cypricus
- Sphecodes gomerensis
- Sphecodes larochei
- Sphecodes piceohirtus
- Sphecodes pseudocrassus
- Sphecodes rubripes

==== Andrenids ====
- Andrena afrensis
- Andrena astrella
- Andrena barbareae
- Andrena batava
- Andrena bayona
- Andrena bucephala
- Andrena cervina
- Andrena chalcogastra
- Andrena chelma
- Andrena corssubalpina
- Andrena curtula
- Andrena curvana
- Andrena cypricola
- Andrena damara
- Andrena dinizi
- Andrena dourada
- Andrena ebmerella
- Andrena elata
- Andrena espanola
- Andrena farinosa
- Andrena fimbriata
- Andrena freygessneri
- Andrena fria
- Tawny mining bee (Andrena fulva)
- Andrena fulvata
- Andrena funerea
- Andrena graecella
- Andrena gredana
- Andrena grossella
- Andrena helenica
- Andrena hillana
- Andrena illyrica
- Andrena korleviciana
- Andrena kornosica
- Andrena lineolata
- Andrena lonicera
- Andrena montana
- Andrena montarca
- Andrena murana
- Andrena muscaria
- Andrena nebularia
- Andrena neovirida
- Andrena nilotica
- Andrena nitidula
- Andrena notata
- Andrena olympica
- Andrena pareklisiae
- Andrena pastellensis
- Andrena pauxilla
- Andrena pellucens
- Andrena pelopa
- Andrena relata
- Andrena resoluta
- Andrena rhenana
- Andrena roseipes
- Andrena sagittaria
- Andrena sandanskia
- Andrena semilaevis
- Andrena sibthorpi
- Andrena siciliana
- Andrena solenopalpa
- Andrena standfussorum
- Andrena suerinensis
- Andrena taxana
- Andrena tricuspidata
- Andrena trikalensis
- Andrena vacella
- Camptopoeum nasutum
- Flavipanurgus fuzetus
- Flavipanurgus merceti
- Panurginus alpinus
- Panurginus annulatus
- Panurginus montanus
- Panurginus schwarzi
- Panurginus sericatus
- Panurginus tyrolensis
- Panurgus corsicus
- Panurgus siculus
- Simpanurgus phyllopodus

==== Megachilids ====
- Chelostoma grande
- Chelostoma hellenicum
- Chelostoma laticaudum
- Chelostoma siciliae
- Dioxys atlantica
- Dioxys lanzarotensis
- Hoplitis albatera
- Hoplitis cretaea
- Hoplitis fabrei
- Hoplitis graeca
- Hoplitis hilbera
- Hoplitis holmboei
- Hoplitis lithodorae
- Hoplitis manuelae
- Hoplitis parnesica
- Hoplitis peniculifera
- Hoplitis tenuispina
- Hoplitis tkalcuella
- Hoplitis zandeni
- Megachile alpicola
- Megachile apennina
- Megachile baetica
- Megachile benoisti
- Megachile binominata
- Megachile bioculata
- Megachile breviceps
- Megachile canariensis
- Megachile canescens
- Megachile cressa
- Megachile dacica
- Megachile fuerteventurae
- Megachile ghilianii
- Megachile giraudi
- Megachile gothalauniensis
- Megachile hohmanni
- Megachile hungarica
- Megachile lucidifrons
- Megachile mavromoustakisi
- Megachile opacifrons
- Megachile pugillatoria
- Megachile punctatissima
- Megachile pusilla
- Megachile rhodosiaca
- Megachile roeweri
- Megachile rufescens
- Megachile semicircularis
- Megachile semipleta
- Megachile troodica
- Osmia ariadne
- Osmia balearica
- Osmia dusmeti
- Osmia iberica
- Osmia larochei
- Osmia madeirensis
- Osmia mirhiji
- Osmia moreensis
- Osmia palmae
- Osmia picena
- Osmia steinmanni
- Osmia svenssoni
- Protosmia asensioi
- Protosmia capitata
- Protosmia minutula
- Pseudoanthidium canariense
- Stelis franconica
- Stelis ortizi

=== Mantises ===
- Betancurian dwarf mantis (Pseudoyersinia betancuriae)
- Hairy legged dwarf mantis (Pseudoyersinia pilipes)
- Teydean dwarf mantis (Pseudoyersinia teydeana)

=== Lepidoptera ===
Lepidoptera comprises moths and butterflies. There are 87 species in the order Lepidoptera assessed as data deficient.

==== Pyralids ====
- ʻOhe hedyleptan moth (Omiodes asaphombra)
- Omiodes continuatalis
- Oahu Swamp hedyleptan moth (Omiodes epicentra)
- Olaʻa banana hedyleptan moth (Omiodes euryprora)
- Fullaway's banana hedyleptan moth (Omiodes fullawayi)
- Laysan hedyleptan moth (Omiodes laysanensis)
- Meyrick's banana hedyleptan moth (Omiodes meyricki)
- Maui banana hedyleptan moth (Omiodes musicola)
- Telegraphic hedyleptan moth (Omiodes telegrapha)

==== Swallowtail butterflies ====
- Losaria palu (Atrophaneura palu)
- Mansfield's three-tailed swallowtail (Bhutanitis mansfieldi)
- Graphium aurivilliusi
- Chinese luehdorfia (Luehdorfia chinensis)
- Tithonus birdwing (Ornithoptera tithonus)
- African giant swallowtail (Papilio antimachus)
- Scarce Haitian swallowtail (Papilio aristor)
- Poey's black swallowtail (Papilio caiguanabus)
- Papilio garleppi
- Papilio maroni
- Madagascan emperor swallowtail (Papilio morondavana)
- Parides coelus
- Hahnel's Amazonian swallowtail (Parides hahneli)
- Parides klagesi
- Parides pizarro
- Parides steinbachi
- Golden kaiserihind (Teinopalpus aureus)

==== Lycaenids ====
- Mullin's copper (Aloeides mullini)
- Donzel's silver-line (Apharitis zohra)
- Steely argus (Aricia bassoni)
- St. Leger's epitola (Cerautola legeri)
- Salvatore's ciliate blue (Cupidesthes salvatoris)
- Deudorix loxias
- Schmitt's eresina (Eresina schmitti)
- Eresiomera ouesso
- Green tiger blue (Hewitsonia beryllina)
- Caroline's sapphire (Iolaus carolinae)
- Fouta Djalon sapphire (Iolaus djaloni)
- Likpe sapphire (Iolaus likpe)
- Newport's sapphire (Iolaus newporti)
- Lachnocnema riftensis
- Lepidochrysops delicata
- Pennington's blue (Lepidochrysops penningtoni)
- Leptomyrina sudanica
- Micropentila bunyoro
- Ornipholidotos francisci
- Ornipholidotos ghesquierei
- Ornipholidotos goodgerae
- Ornipholidotos nancy
- Martin's blue (Plebejus martini)
- Poecilmitis pan
- Cilician blue (Polyommatus cilicius)
- Polyommatus eleniae
- Lebanon blue (Polyommatus ellisoni)
- Polyommatus isauricoides
- Lebanon beautiful blue (Polyommatus larseni)
- Polyommatus pljushtchi
- Kocak's blue (Polyommatus sertavulensis)
- Lebanese adonis blue (Polyommatus syriacus)
- Pseudaletis arrhon
- Ducarme's fantasy (Pseudaletis ducarmei)
- Melissa's fantasy (Pseudaletis melissae)
- Sardinian blue (Pseudophilotes barbagiae)
- Jordan blue (Pseudophilotes jordanicus)
- Kigoma telipna (Telipna kigoma)
- Dondo buff (Teriomima williami)
- Thermoniphas stempfferi
- Toxochitona ankole

==== Nymphalids ====
- Dark giant grayling (Berberia lambessanus)
- Plantrou's forester (Euphaedra plantroui)
- Scarce fritillary (Euphydryas maturna)
- Algerian grayling (Hipparchia ellena)
- Mycalesis tilmara
- Neptis vingerhoedti
- False meadow brown (Pyronia janiroides)
- Tirumala alba

==== Skippers ====
- Eight-spotted skipper (Dalla octomaculata)
- Algerian grizzled skipper (Muschampia leuzeae)
- Barbary skipper (Muschampia mohammed)
- Aladag skipper (Pyrgus aladaghensis)
- Bolkar skipper (Pyrgus bolkariensis)

==== Other Lepidoptera species ====
- Eriogaster catax
- Algerian dappled white (Euchloe pechi)
- Spanish moon moth (Graellsia isabelae)
- Hyles hippophaes
- Mylothris polychroma
- Willowherb hawkmoth (Proserpinus proserpina)
- Hawaiian hopseed looper moth (Scotorythra paratactis)

=== Beetles ===
There are 377 beetle species assessed as data deficient.

==== Geotrupids ====
- Allotrypes mandibularis
- Ceratophyus maghrebinicus
- Ceratophyus schaffrathi
- Lethrus macrognathus
- Lethrus rotundicollis
- Thorectes asperifrons
- Thorectes demoflysi
- Thorectes juengeri
- Thorectes latus
- Thorectes reflexus
- Thorectes trituberculatus
- Trypocopris amedei

==== Longhorn beetles ====
- Axinopalpis barbarae
- Chlorophorus aegyptiacus
- Lioderina linearis
- Procallimus egregius
- Pseudosphegesthes cinerea
- Purpuricenus globulicollis
- Purpuricenus graecus
- Stenopterus similatus

==== Click beetles ====
- Agriotes passosi
- Alestrus dolosus
- Ampedus balcanicus
- Ampedus boquilobensis
- Ampedus bouweri
- Ampedus callegarii
- Ampedus francolinus
- Ampedus fuentei
- Ampedus gallicus
- Ampedus hispanicus
- Ampedus impressicollis
- Ampedus karneri
- Ampedus karpathicus
- Ampedus koschwitzi
- Ampedus macedonicus
- Ampedus magistrettii
- Ampedus melanurus
- Ampedus minos
- Ampedus pooti
- Ampedus pyrenaeus
- Ampedus rugosus
- Ampedus talamellii
- Ampedus vandalitiae
- Ampedus ziegleri
- Athous mendesi
- Athous recaldei
- Athous schurmanni
- Athous strictus
- Athous zuzartei
- Brachygonus campadellii
- Cardiophorus widenfalki
- Denticollis interpositus
- Haterumelater schembrii
- Haterumelater tauricola
- Porthmidius gelineki
- Procraerus cretensis
- Stenagostus laufferi
- Stenagostus sardiniensis

==== Erotylids ====
- Triplax andreinii
- Triplax carpathica
- Triplax cyanescens
- Triplax pygmaea
- Triplax rudis
- Triplax tergestana

==== Scarabaeids ====
- Afrodrepanus marshalli
- Aganocrossus vejdovskyi
- Agoliinus pittinoi
- Ahermodontus bischoffi
- Ahermodontus marini
- Allogymnopleurus histrio
- Alocoderus mineti
- Amietina larrochei
- Ammoecius amplicollis
- Ammoecius dogueti
- Ammoecius felscheanus
- Ammoecius naviauxi
- Ammoecius numidicus
- Ammoecius rugifrons
- Ammoecius satanas
- Anisocanthon pygmaeus
- Anomiopus ataenioides
- Anomiopus birai
- Anomiopus caputipilus
- Anomiopus gracilis
- Anomiopus howdeni
- Anomiopus idei
- Anomiopus lacordairei
- Anomiopus laetus
- Anomiopus pictus
- Anomiopus soledari
- Anomius antii
- Anomius hamricola
- Anomius neidae
- Anomius theryi
- Ateuchus contractus
- Ateuchus ecuadorensis
- Ateuchus euchalceus
- Ateuchus laevicollis
- Ateuchus romani
- Bdelyrus apaporisae
- Bdelyrus boliviensis
- Bdelyrus cochabambae
- Bdelyrus grandis
- Bdelyrus iquitosensis
- Bdelyrus leptomerus
- Bdelyrus metaensis
- Bdelyrus paraensis
- Bdelyrus triangulus
- Bodilus marani
- Byrrhidium convexum
- Caccobius croceocinctus
- Canthidium abbreviatum
- Canthidium angulicolle
- Canthidium aterrimum
- Canthidium atomarium
- Canthidium aurichalceum
- Canthidium calidum
- Canthidium coerulescens
- Canthidium deplanatum
- Canthidium erythropterum
- Canthidium flabellatum
- Canthidium flavicorne
- Canthidium flavipes
- Canthidium flavum
- Canthidium glabricolle
- Canthidium haagi
- Canthidium luteum
- Canthidium magnum
- Canthidium metallicum
- Canthidium nitidum
- Canthidium opacum
- Canthidium subdopuncticolle
- Canthidium viridicolle
- Canthidium viridiobscurum
- Canthon brunnipennis
- Canthon coloratus
- Canthon columbianus
- Canthon corruscans
- Canthon divinator
- Canthon formosus
- Canthon gemellatus
- Canthon helleri
- Canthon plagiatus
- Canthon sericatus
- Canthon simulans
- Canthon vulcanoae
- Canthonella instriata
- Catharsius bradshawi
- Catharsius brittoni
- Catharsius rhinoceros
- Cheironitis indicus
- Chilothorax brancoi
- Chilothorax discedens
- Chilothorax equitis
- Chilothorax fritschi
- Chilothorax hucklesbyi
- Chilothorax mossulensis
- Copris amabilis
- Copris capensis
- Copris complexus
- Copris fallax
- Copris morphaeus
- Copris ritsemae
- Copris serius
- Copris victorini
- Copris wiesei
- Coproecus hemisphaericus
- Coprophanaeus rigoutorum
- Coprophanaeus terrali
- Coptorhina nitefacta
- Cryptocanthon medinae
- Cryptocanthon otonga
- Deltochilum cristinae
- Deltochilum violetae
- Deltorrhinum batesi
- Demarziella eungella
- Demarziella planitarsis
- Demarziella storeyi
- Demarziella tropicalis
- Dendropaemon crenatostriatus
- Dendropaemon tenuitarsis
- Diastellopalpus thomsoni
- Dichotomius alyattes
- Dichotomius dahli
- Dichotomius fallax
- Dichotomius horridus
- Dichotomius nutans
- Dichotomius problematicus
- Epirinus asper
- Epirinus comosus
- Epirinus relictus
- Epirinus sulcipennis
- Esymus alkani
- Esymus filitarsis
- Esymus fumigatulus
- Esymus ornatulus
- Esymus sicardi
- Euheptaulacus nemethi
- Euoniticellus perniger
- Euonthophagus maindroni
- Euorodalus elephanthinus
- Euorodalus longevittatus
- Frankenbergerius forcipatus
- Frankenbergerius nitidus
- Frankenbergerius opacus
- Grandinaphodius inferorum
- Grandinaphodius smoliki
- Gymnopleurus aeruginosus
- Gymnopleurus bicolor
- Gymnopleurus thelwalli
- Heptaulacus algarbiensis
- Heptaulacus pirazzolii
- Heptaulacus syrticola
- Ixodina freyi
- Kolbeellus ateuchoides
- Lepanus gelasinus
- Lepanus pisoniae
- Liatongus urus
- Limarus hirtipennis
- Liothorax isikdagensis
- Macroderes cornutus
- Mecynodes anemurensis
- Mecynodes angulosus
- Mecynodes trochilus
- Megalonitis bohemani
- Melinopterus abeillei
- Melinopterus sertavulensis
- Mendidaphodius palaestinensis
- Mendidius calliger
- Metacatharsius transvaalensis
- Namakwanus streyi
- Neagolius heydeni
- Neosisyphus kuhni
- Nimbus harpagonis
- Nimbus libanonensis
- Nobiellus bonnairei
- Nobius rhodiensis
- Odontoloma obscurum
- Oniticellus pseudoplanatus
- Onitis adelphus
- Onitis aeruginosus
- Onitis dispar
- Onitis ezechias
- Onitis keniensis
- Onitis kingstoni
- Onitis meyeri
- Onitis mniszechi
- Onitis monstrosus
- Onitis nemoralis
- Onitis parainflaticollis
- Onitis parvulus
- Onitis retrodentatus
- Onitis tanzaniensis
- Ontherus androgynus
- Onthophagus adelaidae
- Onthophagus alquirta
- Onthophagus amphioxus
- Onthophagus anatolicus
- Onthophagus arai
- Onthophagus azusae
- Onthophagus babaulti
- Onthophagus beesoni
- Onthophagus bicolensis
- Onthophagus bindaree
- Onthophagus bonsae
- Onthophagus bytinskii
- Onthophagus caesariatus
- Onthophagus caprai
- Onthophagus carinulatus
- Onthophagus cavia
- Onthophagus circulator
- Onthophagus citreum
- Onthophagus compressus
- Onthophagus depilatus
- Onthophagus diversiformis
- Onthophagus eschscholtzi
- Onthophagus falculatus
- Onthophagus ferrari
- Onthophagus gajo
- Onthophagus hageni
- Onthophagus hemipygus
- Onthophagus hildebrandti
- Onthophagus histeriformis
- Onthophagus hyalcyon
- Onthophagus iyengari
- Onthophagus kanarensis
- Onthophagus kangeanus
- Onthophagus kirki
- Onthophagus kyleensis
- Onthophagus lamgalio
- Onthophagus massai
- Onthophagus nagpurensis
- Onthophagus nefarius
- Onthophagus numidicus
- Onthophagus planifrons
- Onthophagus praedatus
- Onthophagus pseudovirens
- Onthophagus rhinocerus
- Onthophagus rugosicollis
- Onthophagus rugulipennis
- Onthophagus sikkimensis
- Onthophagus spathatus
- Onthophagus strabo
- Onthophagus suermelii
- Onthophagus surdus
- Onthophagus tricolor
- Onthophagus trigibber
- Onthophagus vilis
- Onthophagus yiryoront
- Osmanius dellacasai
- Panelus bakeri
- Paracoptochirus kozanensis
- Paracoptochirus petrovitzi
- Paracoptochirus singularis
- Paracoptochirus vignai
- Parammoecius amanicus
- Paraphytus africanus
- Paraphytus foveatus
- Pedaria granulosa
- Pedaria hanae
- Pedaria insularis
- Pedaria morettoi
- Pedaria ovata
- Pedaria spinithorax
- Pedaria tibialis
- Phaeaphodius fusculus
- Plagiogonus nanoides
- Proagoderus biarmatus
- Proagoderus brucei
- Proagoderus plato
- Proagoderus versus
- Pseudacrossus sharpi
- Pseudacrossus wewalkai
- Pseudacrossus zurcheri
- Pseudochironitis stuhlmanni
- Scarabaeus asceticus
- Scarabaeus augias
- Scarabaeus caffer
- Scarabaeus canaliculatus
- Scarabaeus ebenus
- Scarabaeus gagates
- Scarabaeus ritchiei
- Scarabaeus rixosus
- Scarabaeus xavieri
- Scatimus onorei
- Scatimus pacificus
- Scatonomus lauropalui
- Scatonomus xanthopygus
- Scybalocanthon nigellus
- Sulcophanaeus actaeon
- Sulcophanaeus columbi
- Sylvicanthon obscurus
- Tesserodon feehani
- Tesserodon pilicrepus
- Tesserodoniella elguetai
- Thyregis relictus
- Thyregis tarsatus
- Tomogonus crassoides
- Trichillum cordobense
- Uroxys angulicollis
- Uroxys catharinensis
- Uroxys latesulcatus
- Uroxys lojanus
- Uroxys monstrosus
- Uroxys pygmaeus
- Uroxys rugatus
- Zonocopris machadoi

==== Other beetle species ====
- Ancyrona japonica
- Clypeorhagus clypeatus
- Hylis slipinskii
- Microrhagus hummleri
- Mycetophagus tauricus
- Pediacus tabellatus
- Protaetia sardea
- Tenebroides fuscus
- Thambus frivaldskyi
- Thymalus oblongus

=== Odonata ===
Odonata includes dragonflies and damselflies. There are 868 species in the order Odonata assessed as data deficient.

==== Platystictids ====
- Drepanosticta attala
- Drepanosticta berlandi
- Drepanosticta conica
- Drepanosticta exoleta
- Drepanosticta hamadryas
- Drepanosticta jurzitzai
- Drepanosticta khaochongensis
- Drepanosticta kruegeri
- Drepanosticta lepyricollis
- Drepanosticta luzonica
- Drepanosticta palauensis
- Drepanosticta pan
- Drepanosticta polychromatica
- Drepanosticta sharpi
- Drepanosticta spatulifera
- Drepanosticta sundana
- Drepanosticta tenella
- Drepanosticta vietnamica
- Drepanosticta viridis
- Wall's shadowdamsel (Drepanosticta walli)
- Palaemnema apicalis
- Palaemnema azupizui
- Palaemnema bilobulata
- Palaemnema brucei
- Palaemnema carmelita
- Palaemnema cyclohamulata
- Palaemnema lorena
- Palaemnema martini
- Palaemnema peruviana
- Palaemnema spinulata
- Protosticta antelopoides
- Protosticta caroli
- Protosticta feronia
- Protosticta fraseri
- Protosticta hearseyi
- Protosticta himalaica
- Protosticta robusta
- Protosticta satoi
- Protosticta trilobata
- Protosticta uncata
- Protosticta versicolor
- Protosticta zhengi

==== Chlorogomphids ====
- Chlorogomphus albomarginatus
- Chlorogomphus daviesi
- Chlorogomphus fraseri
- Chlorogomphus kitawakii
- Chlorogomphus magnificus
- Chlorogomphus miyashitai
- Chlorogomphus montanus
- Chlorogomphus mortoni
- Chlorogomphus preciosus
- Chlorogomphus sachiyoae
- Chlorogomphus schmidti
- Chlorogomphus shanicus
- Chlorogomphus speciosus
- Chlorogomphus takakuwai
- Chlorogomphus vietnamensis
- Chlorogomphus yokoii
- Chloropetalia owadai
- Chloropetalia soarer
- Watanabeopetalia usignata

==== Argiolestids ====
- Argiolestes alfurus
- Argiolestes connectens
- Argiolestes kirbyi
- Argiolestes luteipes
- Argiolestes saltuarius
- Argiolestes simplex
- Argiolestes tenuispinus
- Argiolestes tristis
- Barrington flatwing (Austroargiolestes brookhousei)
- Caledargiolestes janiceae
- Turquoise flatwing (Griseargiolestes bucki)
- Nesolestes drocera
- Nesolestes mariae
- Nesolestes martini
- Nesolestes pauliani
- Nesolestes ranavalona
- Nesolestes tuberculicollis
- Podolestes coomansi
- Podopteryx casuarina

==== Chlorocyphids ====
- Calocypha laidlawi
- Congo red jewel (Chlorocypha ghesquierei)
- Sunset jewel (Chlorocypha helenae)
- Dull jewel (Chlorocypha neptunus)
- Red-bellied jewel (Chlorocypha rubriventris)
- Indocypha katharina
- Indocypha silbergliedi
- Lucifer jewel (Platycypha eliseva)
- Petite jewel (Platycypha picta)
- Rhinocypha cuneata
- Rhinocypha fulgipennis
- Rhinocypha hilaryae
- Rhinocypha liberata
- Rhinocypha seducta
- Rhinocypha trimaculata
- Rhinocypha vitrinella
- Rhinoneura caerulea

==== Isostictids ====
- Queensland pin (Eurysticta reevesi)
- Selysioneura arboricola
- Selysioneura bacillus
- Selysioneura rhaphia
- Selysioneura virgula
- Titanosticta macrogaster

==== Platycnemidids ====
- Allocnemis eisentrauti
- Gabon yellowwing (Allocnemis interrupta)
- Caconeura gomphoides
- Caconeura ramburi
- Caconeura risi
- Caconeura t-coerulea
- Calicnemia chaoi
- Calicnemia haksik
- Calicnemia mukherjeei
- Calicnemia sudhaae
- Calicnemia uenoi
- Coeliccia acco
- Coeliccia borneensis
- Coeliccia brachysticta
- Coeliccia dorothea
- Coeliccia erici
- Coeliccia furcata
- Coeliccia hoanglienensis
- Coeliccia kimurai
- Coeliccia loringae
- Coeliccia macrostigma
- Coeliccia megumii
- Coeliccia mingxiensis
- Coeliccia montana
- Coeliccia nigrescens
- Coeliccia onoi
- Coeliccia pracritii
- Coeliccia pyriformis
- Coeliccia rossi
- Coeliccia rotundata
- Coeliccia sarbottama
- Coeliccia satoi
- Coeliccia schmidti
- Coeliccia svihleri
- Coeliccia tomokunii
- Coeliccia uenoi
- Coeliccia vacca
- Copera superplatypes
- Cyanocnemis aureofrons
- Elattoneura campioni
- Mealy threadtail (Elattoneura morini)
- Elattoneura nigerrima
- Elattoneura nihari
- Guinea threadtail (Elattoneura perisi)
- Elattoneura souteri
- Esme cyaneovittata
- Esme mudiensis
- Idiocnemis fissidens
- Idiocnemis huonensis
- Indocnemis ambigua
- Lieftinckia ramosa
- Congo riverjack (Mesocnemis saralisa)
- Metacnemis secundaris
- Nososticta evelynae
- Nososticta finisterra
- Spot-winged threadtail (Nososticta kalumburu)
- Koolpinyah threadtail (Nososticta koolpinyah)
- Nososticta nigrifrons
- Nososticta wallacii
- Platycnemis hova
- Platycnemis longiventris
- Phantom featherleg (Platycnemis phasmovolans)
- Platycnemis pseudalatipes
- Prodasineura abbreviata
- Prodasineura doisuthepensis
- Prodasineura flammula
- Prodasineura flavifacies
- Prodasineura odoneli
- Prodasineura peramoena
- Rhyacocnemis leonorae
- Rhyacocnemis prothoracica

==== Megapodagrionids ====
- Allopodagrion erinys
- Archaeopodagrion bilobatum
- Arrhenocnemis amphidactylis
- Bornargiolestes nigra
- Burmargiolestes laidlawi
- Heteragrion dorsale
- Heteragrion flavidorsum
- Heteragrion melanurum
- Heteragrion triangulare
- Philogenia berenice
- Philogenia compressa
- Philogenia ebona
- Philogenia iquita
- Philogenia peruviana
- Philogenia raphaella
- Philogenia schmidti
- Philogenia sucra
- Philogenia umbrosa
- Philosina buchi
- Priscagrion kiautai
- Protolestes furcatus
- Protolestes kerckhoffae
- Rhinagrion tricolor
- Rhipidolestes alleni
- Rhipidolestes bastiaani
- Rhipidolestes chaoi
- Rhipidolestes malaisei
- Rhipidolestes pallidistigma
- Rhipidolestes rubripes
- Tatocnemis crenulatipennis
- Tatocnemis virginiae
- Teinopodagrion muzanum
- Teinopodagrion turikum
- Teinopodagrion vilorianum
- Teinopodagrion waynu

==== Gomphids ====
- Acrogomphus fraseri
- Amphigomphus somnuki
- Anisogomphus caudalis
- Anisogomphus forresti
- Anisogomphus fujianensis
- Anisogomphus nitidus
- Anisogomphus orites
- Anisogomphus pinratani
- Anisogomphus vulvalis
- Anisogomphus yunnanensis
- Aphylla barbata
- Aphylla robusta
- Aphylla silvatica
- Aphylla spinula
- Asiagomphus auricolor
- Asiagomphus corniger
- Asiagomphus gongshanensis
- Asiagomphus melanopsoides
- Asiagomphus nilgiricus
- Asiagomphus odoneli
- Asiagomphus pacatus
- Asiagomphus somnolens
- Asiagomphus xanthenatus
- Murray river hunter (Austrogomphus angelorum)
- Black vicetail (Austrogomphus atratus)
- Northern river hunter (Austrogomphus doddi)
- Tiny hunter (Austrogomphus pusillus)
- Burmagomphus arboreus
- Burmagomphus arthuri
- Burmagomphus cauvericus
- Burmagomphus hasimaricus
- Burmagomphus insolitus
- Burmagomphus johnseni
- Burmagomphus laidlawi
- Burmagomphus minusculus
- Burmagomphus v-flavum
- Cornigomphus guineensis
- Cornigomphus mariannae
- Cyclogomphus heterostylus
- Cyclogomphus wilkinsi
- Syrandiri clubtail (Davidioides martini)
- Davidius baronii
- Davidius chaoi
- Davidius kumaonensis
- Davidius malloryi
- Davidius monastyrskii
- Davidius squarrosus
- Davidius trox
- Davidius yuanbaensis
- Davidius zallorensis
- Davidius zhoui
- Dubitogomphus bidentatus
- Ebegomphus schroederi
- Epigomphus compactus
- West Mexican knobtail (Epigomphus crepidus)
- Epigomphus gibberosus
- Epigomphus llama
- Epigomphus occipitalis
- Epigomphus pechumani
- Erpetogomphus erici
- Dashed ringtail (Erpetogomphus heterodon)
- Erpetogomphus leptophis
- Gomphidia fletcheri
- Gomphidia kodaguensis
- Gomphidia leonorae
- Gomphidia williamsoni
- Gomphus amseli
- Tamaulipan clubtail (Gomphus gonzalezi)
- Gomphus kinzelbachi
- Syrian clubtail (Gomphus ubadschii)
- Heliogomphus cervus
- Heliogomphus chaoi
- Heliogomphus kalarensis
- Heliogomphus spirillus
- Heliogomphus svihleri
- Ictinogomphus celebensis
- Ictinogomphus distinctus
- Ictinogomphus kishori
- Idiogomphoides emmeli
- Isomma elouardi
- Lamelligomphus laetus
- Lamelligomphus parvulus
- Leptogomphus baolocensis
- Leptogomphus inclitus
- Leptogomphus intermedius
- Leptogomphus pasia
- Leptogomphus uenoi
- Lestinogomphus africanus
- Lestinogomphus bivittatus
- Lestinogomphus minutus
- Lestinogomphus silkeae
- Bwamba horntail (Libyogomphus bwambae)
- Western horntail (Libyogomphus christinae)
- Gabon horntail (Libyogomphus emiliae)
- Cameroon horntail (Libyogomphus mamfei)
- Macrogomphus annulatus
- Macrogomphus borikhanensis
- Macrogomphus decemlineatus
- Macrogomphus kerri
- Macrogomphus matsukii
- Macrogomphus montanus
- Macrogomphus rivularis
- Macrogomphus robustus
- Macrogomphus seductus
- Macrogomphus thoracicus
- Macrogomphus wynaadicus
- Mastigogomphus pinheyi
- Megalogomphus bicornutus
- Megalogomphus cochinchinensis
- Megalogomphus flavicolor
- Megalogomphus icterops
- Megalogomphus smithii
- Megalogomphus superbus
- Melligomphus cataractus
- Melligomphus dolus
- Merogomphus chaoi
- Merogomphus longistigma
- Merogomphus tamdaoensis
- Merogomphus vespertinus
- Microgomphus jurzitzai
- Microgomphus lilliputians
- Microgomphus loogali
- Microgomphus torquatus
- Microgomphus verticalis
- Mitragomphus ganzanus
- Neurogomphus agilis
- Neurogomphus angustisigna
- Neurogomphus carlcooki
- Kocytos siphontail (Neurogomphus cocytius)
- Neurogomphus paenuelensis
- Neurogomphus vicinus
- Nihonogomphus indicus
- Nihonogomphus montanus
- Nihonogomphus pulcherrimus
- Nihonogomphus schorri
- Nihonogomphus semanticus
- Nihonogomphus shaowuensis
- Nihonogomphus simillimus
- Yellow-fronted longleg (Notogomphus flavifrons)
- Notogomphus maryae
- Onychogomphus acinaces
- Onychogomphus annularis
- Onychogomphus banteng
- Onychogomphus cacharicus
- Onychogomphus castor
- Onychogomphus cerastis
- Onychogomphus geometricus
- Onychogomphus grammicus
- Onychogomphus kerri
- Onychogomphus kitchingmani
- Onychogomphus maclachlani
- Onychogomphus maculivertex
- Onychogomphus malabarensis
- Onychogomphus meghalayanus
- Intermediate claspertail (Onychogomphus nigrotibialis)
- Onychogomphus pilosus
- Onychogomphus rappardi
- Onychogomphus risi
- Onychogomphus rossii
- Onychogomphus saundersii
- Onychogomphus striatus
- Ophiogomphus sinicus
- Orientogomphus circularis
- Orientogomphus earnshawi
- Orientogomphus naninus
- Paragomphus aureatus
- Ethiopian hooktail (Paragomphus crenigomphoides)
- Paragomphus echinoccipitalis
- Paragomphus frontalis
- Paragomphus hoffmanni
- Paragomphus interruptus
- Kiauta's hooktail (Paragomphus kiautai)
- Paragomphus lindgreni
- Forest hooktail (Paragomphus machadoi)
- Paragomphus maynei
- Paragomphus risi
- Tournier's hooktail (Paragomphus tournieri)
- Paragomphus zambeziensis
- Perigomphus angularis
- Phaenandrogomphus aureus
- Phaenandrogomphus dingavani
- Phaenandrogomphus yunnanensis
- Phyllocycla baria
- Phyllocycla gladiata
- Malkin's forceptail (Phyllocycla malkini)
- Phyllocycla pallida
- Phyllocycla sordida
- Phyllogomphoides aculeus
- Phyllogomphoides camposi
- Phyllogomphoides indicatrix
- Phyllogomphoides litoralis
- Phyllogomphoides pseudangularis
- Phyllogomphoides pseudoundulatus
- Phyllogomphoides singularis
- Phyllogomphoides suspectus
- Phyllogomphus bartolozzii
- Phyllogomphus helenae
- Phyllogomphus occidentalis
- Platygomphus feae
- Progomphus adaptatus
- Progomphus amarillus
- Progomphus amazonicus
- Progomphus angeloi
- Progomphus conjectus
- Progomphus delicatus
- Progomphus maculatus
- Progomphus nervis
- Progomphus nigellus
- Progomphus occidentalis
- Progomphus recurvatus
- Hispaniolan sanddragon (Progomphus serenus)
- Progomphus tantillus
- Scalmogomphus guizhouensis
- Scalmogomphus wenshanensis
- Small dragonhunter (Sieboldius alexanderi)
- Sieboldius gigas
- Sieboldius nigricolor
- Sinogomphus scissus
- Sinogomphus telamon
- Stylogomphus changi
- Stylogomphus tantulus
- Stylurus endicotti
- Stylurus flavicornis
- Stylurus gideon
- Stylurus takashii
- Pinhey's horntail (Tragogomphus ellioti)
- Trigomphus yunnanensis
- Zonophora regalis

==== Cordulegastrids ====
- Anotogaster basalis
- Anotogaster chaoi
- Anotogaster flaveola
- Anotogaster gigantica
- Anotogaster klossi
- Anotogaster sakaii
- Cordulegaster annandalei
- Cordulegaster lunifera
- Cordulegaster vanbrinkae
- Neallogaster schmidti

==== Corduliids ====
- Aeschnosoma rustica
- Hemicordulia hilbrandi
- Hemicordulia mumfordi
- Hemicordulia oceanica
- Libellulosoma minuta
- Navicordulia amazonica
- Navicordulia atlantica
- Broad-tailed shadowdragon (Neurocordulia michaeli)
- Procordulia asahinai
- Somatochlora daviesi
- Somatochlora georgiana
- Treeline emerald (Somatochlora sahlbergi)
- Robust baskettail (Tetragoneuria spinosa)

==== Calopterygids ====
- Caliphaea thailandica
- Calopteryx laosica
- Calopteryx oberthuri
- Hetaerina gallardi
- Hetaerina indeprensa
- Hetaerina mendezi
- Mnais icteroptera
- Mnesarete marginata
- Mnesarete mariana
- Mnesarete smaragdina
- Noguchiphaea mattii
- Noguchiphaea yoshikoae
- Ormenophlebia rollinati
- Smokewing (Sapho fumosa)

==== Coenagrionids ====
- Acanthagrion hartei
- Acanthallagma luteum
- Acanthallagma strohmi
- Gabon slim (Aciagrion balachowskyi)
- Yellow-winged slim (Aciagrion brosseti)
- Aciagrion huaanense
- Awl-tipped slim (Aciagrion macrootithenae)
- Cryptic slim (Aciagrion nodosum)
- Tiny slim (Aciagrion rarum)
- Zambia slim (Aciagrion zambiense)
- Agriocnemis aderces
- Agriocnemis carmelita
- Agriocnemis corbeti
- Tropical wisp (Agriocnemis dobsoni)
- Amphicnemis bicolor
- Amphicnemis glauca
- Amphicnemis pandanicola
- Amphicnemis platystyla
- Argia bicellulata
- Argia fraudatricula
- Argia mishuyaca
- Malabar kino (Argia percellulata)
- Pima dancer (Argia pima)
- Argia subapicalis
- Argiocnemis solitaria
- Cercion luzonicum
- White-faced waxtail (Ceriagrion katamborae)
- Ceriagrion madagazureum
- Ceriagrion nigroflavum
- Ceriagrion nigrolineatum
- Ceriagrion oblongulum
- Ceriagrion pallidum
- Coenagrion australocaspicum
- Coenagrion persicum
- Coenagrion tengchongense
- Coenagrion vanbrinkae
- Cyanallagma angelae
- Cyanallagma ferenigrum
- Cyanallagma ovigerum
- Jamaican bromeliad damsel (Diceratobasis macrogaster)
- Hispaniolan bromeliad damsel (Diceratobasis melanogaster)
- Enallagma risi
- Epipleoneura albuquerquei
- Epipleoneura letitia
- Epipleoneura pereirai
- Epipleoneura protostictoides
- Epipleoneura tariana
- Epipleoneura uncinata
- Erythromma yunnanense
- Forcepsioneura itatiaiae
- Himalagrion exclamationis
- Himalagrion pithoragarhicum
- Hivaagrion demorsum
- Hivaagrion halecarpenteri
- Homeoura silviae
- Homeoura sobrina
- Hylaeargia magnifica
- Woodnymph damsel (Hylaeonympha magoi)
- Inpabasis hubelli
- Ischnura albistigma
- Ischnura buxtoni
- Ischnura indivisa
- Ischnura mahechai
- Ischnura rufovittata
- Tiny threadtail (Junix elumbis)
- Leptagrion acutum
- Leptagrion croceum
- Cream-tipped swampdamsel (Leptobasis melinogaster)
- Amalia helicopter (Mecistogaster amalia)
- Mecistogaster martinezi
- Melanesobasis maculosa
- Mesamphiagrion dunklei
- Mesamphiagrion ecuatoriale
- Metaleptobasis bicornis
- Metaleptobasis brevicauda
- Metaleptobasis gabrielae
- Metaleptobasis guillermoi
- Metaleptobasis lillianae
- Metaleptobasis minteri
- Metaleptobasis panguanae
- Metaleptobasis peltata
- Metaleptobasis tetragena
- Metaleptobasis turbinata
- Mortonagrion alcyone
- Mortonagrion appendiculatum
- Sri Lanka midget (Mortonagrion ceylonicum)
- Mortonagrion varralli
- Orange-sided threadtail (Neoneura carnatica)
- Neoneura jurzitzai
- Neoneura lucas
- Cuban blue threadtail (Neoneura maria)
- Nesobasis rufostigma
- Oreiallagma prothoracicum
- Oxyagrion hermosae
- Pacificagrion dolorosum
- Palaiargia eclecta
- Palaiargia eos
- Palaiargia halcyon
- Palaiargia optata
- Palaiargia tanysiptera
- Papuagrion ekari
- Papuagrion oppositum
- Papuagrion reductum
- Papuargia stueberi
- Peristicta gauchae
- Peristicta lizeria
- Prolonged threadtail (Proneura prolongata)
- Black-fronted threadtail (Protoneura capillaris)
- Protoneura klugi
- Pseudagrion ampolomitae
- Angola sprite (Pseudagrion angolense)
- Pseudagrion apicale
- Pseudagrion azureum
- Pseudagrion cheliferum
- Pretty sprite (Pseudagrion coeruleipunctum)
- Pseudagrion coomansi
- Pseudagrion deconcertans
- Pseudagrion dundoense
- Orange-striped sprite (Pseudagrion grilloti)
- Pseudagrion hamulus
- Pseudagrion igniceps
- Pseudagrion indicum
- Pseudagrion nigripes
- Pseudagrion nigrofasciatum
- Pseudagrion renaudi
- Pseudagrion samoense
- Pseudagrion schmidtianum
- Pseudagrion spinithoracicum
- Pseudagrion tinctipenne
- Pseudagrion vakoanae
- Teinobasis argiocnemis
- Teinobasis nitescens
- Teinobasis prothoracica
- Teinobasis simulans
- Telagrion cornicauda
- Telagrion quadricolor
- Telebasis watsoni
- Thaumatagrion funereum
- Vanuatubasis malekulana
- Kauri redcoat damselfly (Xanthocnemis sobrina)

==== Euphaeids ====
- Anisopleura lieftincki
- Anisopleura trulla
- Anisopleura vallei
- Anisopleura yunnanensis
- Anisopleura zhengi
- Bayadera fasciata
- Bayadera kali
- Bayadera longicauda
- Bayadera nephelopennis
- Bayadera serrata
- Bayadera strigata
- Cryptophaea yunnanensis
- Dysphaea ethela
- Dysphaea walli
- Euphaea hirta
- Schmidtiphaea schmidi

==== Macromiids ====
- Macromia aculeata
- Macromia flavicincta
- Macromia flavovittata
- Macromia fulgidifrons
- Macromia icterica
- Macromia indica
- Macromia kiautai
- Macromia macula
- Macromia pallida
- Macromia pyramidalis
- Macromia septima
- Macromia sombui
- Macromia sophrosyne
- Macromia vangviengensis
- Rainforest cruiser (Macromia viridescens)
- Macromia yunnanensis
- Phyllomacromia girardi
- Western double-spined cruiser (Phyllomacromia lamottei)
- Phyllomacromia legrandi
- Phyllomacromia nigeriensis
- Brown-templed cruiser (Phyllomacromia occidentalis)
- Conbo double-spined cruiser (Phyllomacromia villiersi)

==== Lestids ====
- Archilestes chocoanus
- Small reedling (Indolestes alleni)
- Indolestes anomalus
- Indolestes assamicus
- Indolestes bilineatus
- Indolestes coeruleus
- Indolestes inflatus
- Indolestes pulcherrimus
- Lestes angularis
- Lestes debellardi
- Lestes garoensis
- Lestes malaisei
- Lestes nigriceps
- Algerian spreadwing (Lestes numidicus)
- Lestes silvaticus
- Lestes umbrinus
- Lestes urubamba
- Orolestes durga
- Platylestes heterostylus

==== Aeshnids ====
- Williamson's darner (Aeshna williamsoniana)
- Agyrtacantha othello
- Anaciaeschna melanostoma
- Andaeschna timotocuica
- Boyeria sinensis
- Castoraeschna coronata
- Cephalaeschna acutifrons
- Cephalaeschna aritai
- Cephalaeschna klapperichi
- Yellow-spotted dusk-hawker (Cephalaeschna klotsae)
- Cephalaeschna masoni
- Gynacantha albistyla
- Gynacantha apiaensis
- Gynacantha apicalis
- Gynacantha arnaudi
- Gynacantha arthuri
- Gynacantha bainbriggei
- Gynacantha bartai
- Gynacantha biharica
- Gynacantha burmana
- Gynacantha chelifera
- Gynacantha demeter
- Gynacantha dravida
- Gynacantha hova
- Gynacantha jessei
- Gynacantha khasiaca
- Gynacantha maclachlani
- Gynacantha odoneli
- Gynacantha phaeomeria
- Gynacantha rammohani
- Gynacantha remartinia
- Gynacantha rotundata
- Gynacantha stevensoni
- Linaeschna polli
- Neuraeschna cornuta
- Neuraeschna mayoruna
- Mina net-winged darner (Neuraeschna mina)
- Neuraeschna tapajonica
- Oligoaeschna decorata
- Oligoaeschna elacatura
- Oligoaeschna khasiana
- Oligoaeschna martini
- Oligoaeschna pramoti
- Oligoaeschna speciosa
- Oligoaeschna sumatrana
- Periaeschna lebasi
- Periaeschna unifasciata
- Petaliaeschna fletcheri
- Petaliaeschna lieftincki
- Petaliaeschna tomokunii
- Zambesi hawker (Pinheyschna moori)
- Planaeschna bachmaensis
- Planaeschna chiengmaiensis
- Planaeschna cucphuongensis
- Planaeschna nanlingensis
- Planaeschna owadai
- Planaeschna tamdaoensis
- Planaeschna tomokunii
- Planaeschna viridis
- Rhionaeschna vazquezae
- Sarasaeschna minuta
- Sarasaeschna tsaopiensis
- Tropical cascade darner (Spinaeschna watsoni)
- Staurophlebia gigantula
- Tetracanthagyna brunnea

==== Libellulids ====
- Problematic flasher (Aethiothemis gamblesi)
- Orange flasher (Aethiothemis mediofasciata)
- Agrionoptera dorothea
- Amphithemis curvistyla
- Amphithemis kerri
- Amphithemis vacillans
- Atratothemis reelsi
- Brachydiplax yunnanensis
- Brachygonia ophelia
- Brechmorhoga grenadensis
- Calophlebia interposita
- Calophlebia karschi
- Camacinia harterti
- Cannaphila mortoni
- Celebophlebia dactylogastra
- Crocothemis chaldaeorum
- Crocothemis striata
- Diplacina cyrene
- Diplacina micans
- Bromeliad dragonlet (Erythrodiplax bromeliicola)
- Erythrodiplax cauca
- Erythrodiplax diversa
- Huonia ferentina
- Huonia moerens
- Hydrobasileus vittatus
- Hylaeothemis gardeneri
- Hylaeothemis indica
- Hypothemis hageni
- Leucorrhinia circassica
- Lokia modesta
- Lyriothemis acigastra
- Lyriothemis mortoni
- Lyriothemis salva
- Macrothemis aurimaculata
- Dark leaftipper (Malgassophlebia westfalli)
- Micrathyria duplicata
- Angola micmac (Micromacromia flava)
- Nannophlebia agalma
- Nannophlebia amaryllis
- Nannophlebia buruensis
- Neodythemis arnoulti
- Powdered junglewatcher (Neodythemis fitzgeraldi)
- Bwindi junglewatcher (Neodythemis munyaga)
- Neurothemis feralis
- Neurothemis nesaea
- Canopy skimmer (Nothodiplax dendrophila)
- Oligoclada xanthopleura
- Orthemis teres
- Orthetrum borneense
- Arrow skimmer (Orthetrum sagitta)
- Palaeothemis tillyardi
- Blue rock skimmer (Paltothemis cyanosoma)
- Phyllothemis eltoni
- Mantled spiderlegs (Planiplax machadoi)
- Potamarcha puella
- Pseudagrionoptera diotima
- Pseudotramea prateri
- Rhyothemis splendens
- Risiophlebia risi
- Sympetrum chaconi
- Sympetrum daliensis
- St. Helena darter (Sympetrum dilatatum)
- Sympetrum himalayanum
- Sympetrum orientale
- Sympetrum paramo
- Tapeinothemis boharti
- Tetrathemis denticauda
- Tetrathemis flavescens
- Treefall elf (Tetrathemis fraseri)
- Tetrathemis ruwensoriensis
- Smoky dropwing (Trithemis fumosa)
- Superb dropwing (Trithemis hartwigi)
- Sombre dropwing (Trithemis osvaldae)
- Uracis reducta
- Urothemis bisignata
- St Lucia basker (Urothemis luciana)
- Viridithemis viridula
- Zygonyx ilia
- Zygonyx immaculata
- Zygonyx ranavalonae
- Zyxommoides breviventre

==== Polythorids ====
- Cora chiribiquete
- Cora confusa
- Cora dorada
- Cora dualis
- Cora modesta
- Cora munda
- Cora parda
- Euthore inlactea
- Euthore leroii
- Euthore mirabilis
- Miocora pellucida
- Polythore koepckei
- Polythore williamsoni

==== Other Odonata species ====
- Montane relict damsel (Amphipteryx agrioides)
- Oaxaca relict damsel (Amphipteryx longicaudata)
- Tropical shutwing (Cordulephya bidens)
- Devadatta glaucinota
- Devadatta multinervosa
- Red bareleg (Dicterias atrosanguinea)
- Pretty tigertail (Eusynthemis netta)
- Beech tigertail (Eusynthemis ursula)
- Idionyx corona
- Idionyx imbricata
- Idionyx minima
- Idionyx montana
- Idionyx nadganiensis
- Idionyx nilgiriensis
- Idionyx periyashola
- Idionyx saffronata
- Idionyx travancorensis
- Idionyx unguiculata
- Idionyx yunnanensis
- Jill's shadowcruiser (Idomacromia jillianae)
- Queensland swiftwing (Lathrocordulia garrisoni)
- Macromidia hangzhouensis
- Megalestes discus
- Megalestes irma
- Megalestes lieftincki
- Megalestes raychoudhurii
- Neocordulia griphus
- Neocordulia mambucabensis
- Neocordulia volxemi
- Spotwing (Neopetalia punctata)
- Nesocordulia malgassica
- Nesocordulia villiersi
- Perilestes gracillimus
- Perissolestes castor
- Philoganga loringae
- Unicorn redspot (Phyllopetalia stictica)
- Synthemis evelynae
- Synthemis flexicauda

== See also ==
- Lists of IUCN Red List data deficient species
- List of least concern arthropods
- List of near threatened arthropods
- List of vulnerable arthropods
- List of endangered arthropods
- List of critically endangered arthropods
- List of recently extinct arthropods
