= Distocambarus youngineri =

Conservation status
- Vulnerable (IUCN 3.1)

- Critically Imperiled (NatureServe)

Scientific classification
- Kingdom: Animalia
- Phylum: Arthropoda
- Class: Malacostraca
- Order: Decapoda
- Suborder: Pleocyemata
- Family: Cambaridae
- Genus: Distocambarus
- Species: D. youngineri

Binomial name
- Distocambarus youngineri (Hobbs & Carlson, 1985)

Species of crayfish

Distocambarus youngineri, the Newberry burrowing crayfish, is a species of crayfish in the family Cambaridae. It is endemic to South Carolina. The common name refers to Newberry county, where the original specimens were found.

The IUCN conservation status of Distocambarus youngineri is "VU", vulnerable. The species faces a high risk of endangerment in the medium term. The population is decreasing. The IUCN status was reviewed in 2010.
