= Distocambarus =

Scientific classification
- Kingdom: Animalia
- Phylum: Arthropoda
- Class: Malacostraca
- Order: Decapoda
- Suborder: Pleocyemata
- Family: Cambaridae
- Genus: Distocambarus (Hobbs, 1981)

Type species
- Distocambarus devexus (Hobbs, 1981)

Genus of crayfishes

Distocambarus is a genus of burrowing crayfish native to Georgia and South Carolina in the United States. It contains five species:

- Distocambarus carlsoni (Hobbs, 1983) – Data deficient
- Distocambarus crockeri (Hobbs & Carlson, 1983) – Data deficient
- Distocambarus devexus (Hobbs, 1981) – Data deficient
- Distocambarus hunteri (Fitzpatrick & Eversole, 1997) – Vulnerable
- Distocambarus youngineri (Hobbs & Carlson, 1985) – Vulnerable
