= Echinodillo =

Scientific classification
- Kingdom: Animalia
- Phylum: Arthropoda
- Class: Malacostraca
- Order: Isopoda
- Suborder: Oniscidea
- Family: Armadillidae
- Genus: Echinodillo; Jackson, 1935

Species
- Echinodillo cavaticus Echinodillo montanus

Genus of woodlice

Echinodillo is a genus of woodlice in the family Armadillidae. It contains two species.

== Species ==
=== E. cavaticus ===
Echinodillo cavaticus Green, 1963, the Flinders Island cave slater, is endemic to caves on Flinders Island, Tasmania. It is listed as data deficient on the IUCN Red List.

=== E. montanus ===
Echinodillo montanus Jackson, 1935 is endemic to the Marquesas Islands.
