= Occidodiaptomus kummerloewei =

Conservation status
- Data Deficient (IUCN 2.3)

Scientific classification
- Kingdom: Animalia
- Phylum: Arthropoda
- Class: Copepoda
- Order: Calanoida
- Family: Diaptomidae
- Genus: Occidodiaptomus
- Species: O. kummerloewei

Binomial name
- Occidodiaptomus kummerloewei (Mann, 1940)

Synonyms
- Hemidiaptomus kummerloewi Mann, 1940

Species of crustacean

Occidodiaptomus kummerloewei is a species of copepod in the family Diaptomidae, which has only been recorded from a pool near Ilgaz, Turkey.
