= Megachile pusilla =

Scientific classification
- Domain: Eukaryota
- Kingdom: Animalia
- Phylum: Arthropoda
- Class: Insecta
- Order: Hymenoptera
- Family: Megachilidae
- Genus: Megachile
- Species: M. pusilla

Binomial name
- Megachile pusilla Pérez, 1884

Species of leafcutter bee (Megachile)

Megachile pusilla is a species of bee in the family Megachilidae. It was described by Pérez in 1884.
