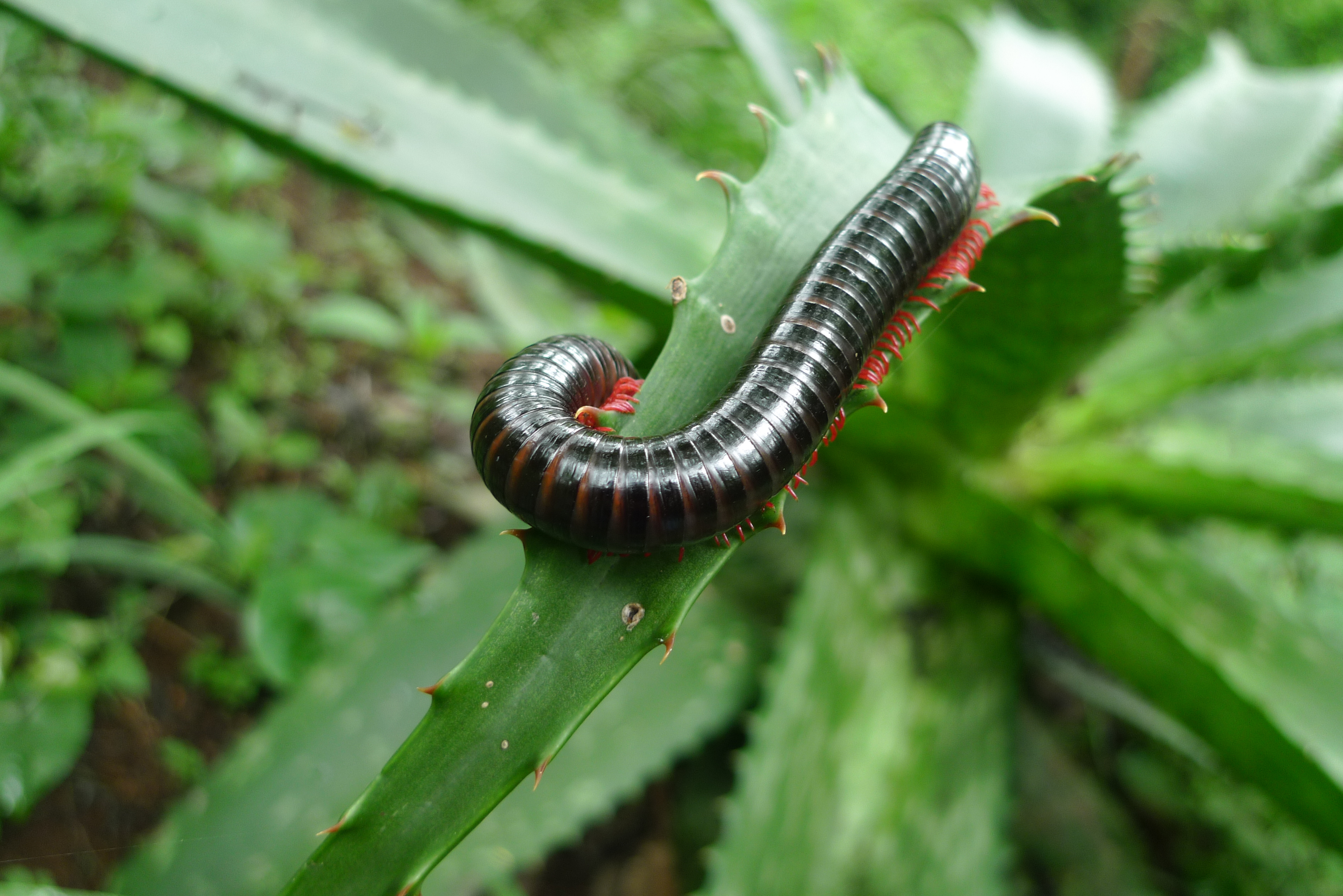

Scientific classification
- Kingdom: Animalia
- Phylum: Arthropoda
- Subphylum: Myriapoda
- Class: Diplopoda
- Order: Spirostreptida
- Family: Spirostreptidae
- Genus: Doratogonus; Attems, 1914

Species
- See text

= Doratogonus =

Genus of millipedes

Doratogonus is a genus of millipedes in family Spirostreptidae. They are relatively large, at 80–200 millimetres (3–8 in) long, relatively common, and distributed across Southern Africa. Many of the species are listed on the IUCN Red List due to habitat destruction.

== Species ==
CR: critically endangered; EN: endangered; VU: vulnerable; LC: least concern; DD: data deficient.

Species	Authority	Year	Common name	IUCN status	Distribution
Doratogonus annulipes	Carl	1917		LC	South Africa, Lesotho
Doratogonus avius	Hamer	2000	solitary black millipede	VU	South Africa (KwaZulu-Natal)
Doratogonus barbatus	Hamer	2000	bearded black millipede	VU	South Africa (Limpopo, Mpumalanga)
Doratogonus bilobatus	(Schubart)	1966		DD	South Africa (KwaZulu-Natal, Mpumalanga)
Doratogonus castaneus	(Attems)	1928		LC	South Africa, Eswatini
Doratogonus circulus	(Attems)	1914		DD	South Africa (Eastern Cape)
Doratogonus cristulatus	(Porat)	1872		LC	South Africa (KwaZulu-Natal)
Doratogonus falcatus	(Attems)	1928		LC	South Africa (KwaZulu-Natal)
Doratogonus flavifilis	(Peters)	1855		LC	South Africa, Mozambique
Doratogonus furculifer	(Lawrence)	1965	Badplaas black millipede	EN	South Africa (Mpumalanga)
Doratogonus herberti	Hamer	2000	Herbert's black millipede	VU	South Africa (Limpopo)
Doratogonus hoffmani	Hamer	2000	Hoffman's black millipede	VU	South Africa (KwaZulu-Natal)
Doratogonus infragilis	Hamer	2000	strong black millipede	EN	South Africa (KwaZulu-Natal)
Doratogonus krausi	(Lawrence)	1965		LC	South Africa (Free State, KwaZulu-Natal, Mpumalanga)
Doratogonus levigatus	(Attems)	1928		LC	South Africa (Gauteng, North West)
Doratogonus liberatus	Hamer	2000		DD	South Africa (Free State)
Doratogonus major	(Lawrence)	1965	major black millipede	CR	South Africa (KwaZulu-Natal)
Doratogonus meridionalis	Hamer	2000	southern black millipede	VU	South Africa (KwaZulu-Natal)
Doratogonus minor	Hamer	2000	minor black millipede	EN	South Africa (KwaZulu-Natal)
Doratogonus montanus	Hamer	2000		LC	South Africa (KwaZulu-Natal)
Doratogonus natalensis	Hamer	2000	Natal black millipede	VU	South Africa (KwaZulu-Natal)
Doratogonus praealtus	Hamer	2000		DD	South Africa, Eswatini
Doratogonus precarius	Hamer	2000	precarious black millipede	VU	South Africa (KwaZulu-Natal, Mpumalanga)
Doratogonus rubipodus	Hamer	2000	ruby-legged black millipede	EN	South Africa (KwaZulu-Natal)
Doratogonus rugifrons	(Attems)	1922		LC	South Africa, Botswana, Namibia, Zimbabwe
Doratogonus septentrionalis	Hamer	2000	northern black millipede	EN	South Africa (KwaZulu-Natal)
Doratogonus stephensi	Hamer	2000		DD	South Africa, Botswana, Zimbabwe
Doratogonus subpartitus	(Karsch)	1881		DD	South Africa (Gauteng)
Doratogonus transvaalensis	(Schubart)	1966		DD	South Africa (Limpopo)
Doratogonus xanthopus	(Attems)	1928		LC	South Africa (Eastern Cape, KwaZulu-Natal)
Doratogonus zuluensis	Hamer	2000	Zululand black millipede	EN	South Africa (KwaZulu-Natal)
