= Onthophagus adelaidae =

Scientific classification
- Kingdom: Animalia
- Phylum: Arthropoda
- Clade: Pancrustacea
- Class: Insecta
- Order: Coleoptera
- Suborder: Polyphaga
- Infraorder: Scarabaeiformia
- Family: Scarabaeidae
- Genus: Onthophagus
- Species: O. adelaidae

Binomial name
- Onthophagus adelaidae Hope, 1846

Species of beetle

Onthophagus adelaidae is a species of beetle discovered by Frederick William Hope in 1846. No sub-species are listed at Catalogue of Life.
