= Echinodillo cavaticus =

Conservation status
- Data Deficient (IUCN 2.3)

Scientific classification
- Kingdom: Animalia
- Phylum: Arthropoda
- Class: Malacostraca
- Order: Isopoda
- Suborder: Oniscidea
- Family: Armadillidae
- Genus: Echinodillo
- Species: E. cavaticus

Binomial name
- Echinodillo cavaticus Green, 1963

Species of woodlouse

Echinodillo cavaticus, the Flinders Island cave slater, is a species of woodlouse in the family Armadillidae. It is endemic to caves on Flinders Island, Tasmania.
