= Megachile rhodosiaca =

Scientific classification
- Domain: Eukaryota
- Kingdom: Animalia
- Phylum: Arthropoda
- Class: Insecta
- Order: Hymenoptera
- Family: Megachilidae
- Genus: Megachile
- Species: M. rhodosiaca

Binomial name
- Megachile rhodosiaca Rebmann, 1972

Species of leafcutter bee (Megachile)

Megachile rhodosiaca is a species of bee in the family Megachilidae. It was described by Rebmann in 1972.
