= Acanthothelphusa didieri =

Conservation status
- Data Deficient (IUCN 3.1)

Scientific classification
- Kingdom: Animalia
- Phylum: Arthropoda
- Class: Malacostraca
- Order: Decapoda
- Suborder: Pleocyemata
- Infraorder: Brachyura
- Family: Potamonautidae
- Genus: Acanthothelphusa
- Species: A. didieri

Binomial name
- Acanthothelphusa didieri (Rathbun, 1904)

Species of crab

Acanthothelphusa didieri is a species of crab in the family Potamonautidae. It is endemic to the Democratic Republic of the Congo, but has not been observed for 100 years; it is therefore listed as Data Deficient on the IUCN Red List.
