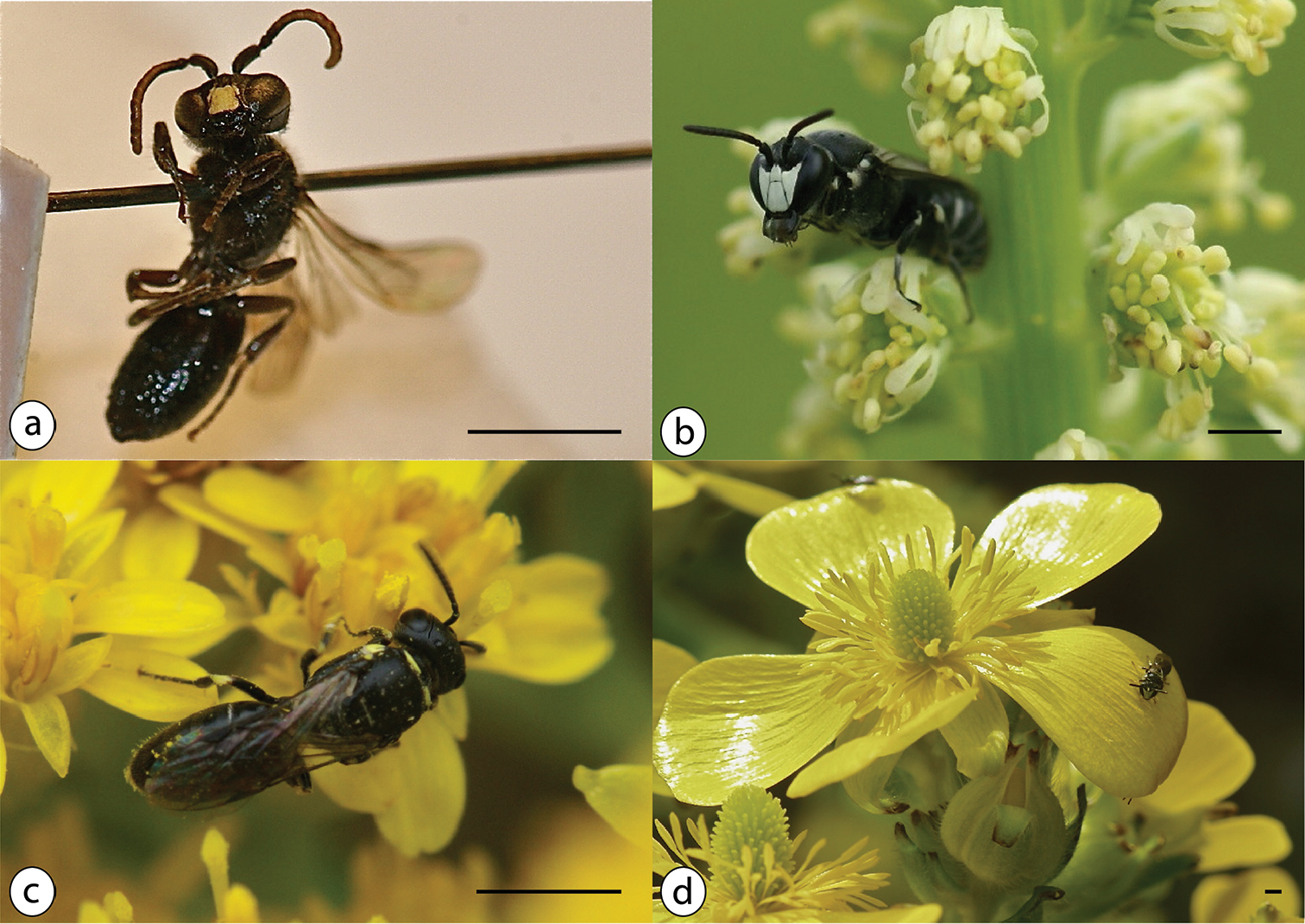
- Hylaeus azorae (top-left)

Conservation status
- Data Deficient (IUCN 3.1)

Scientific classification
- Kingdom: Animalia
- Phylum: Arthropoda
- Clade: Pancrustacea
- Class: Insecta
- Order: Hymenoptera
- Family: Colletidae
- Genus: Hylaeus
- Species: H. azorae

Binomial name
- Hylaeus azorae (Warncke, 1992)

= Hylaeus azorae =

Species of bee

Hylaeus|azorae is a species of bee in the family Colletidae. It is known only from the island of Pico in the Azores (type locality: Mount Pico).
