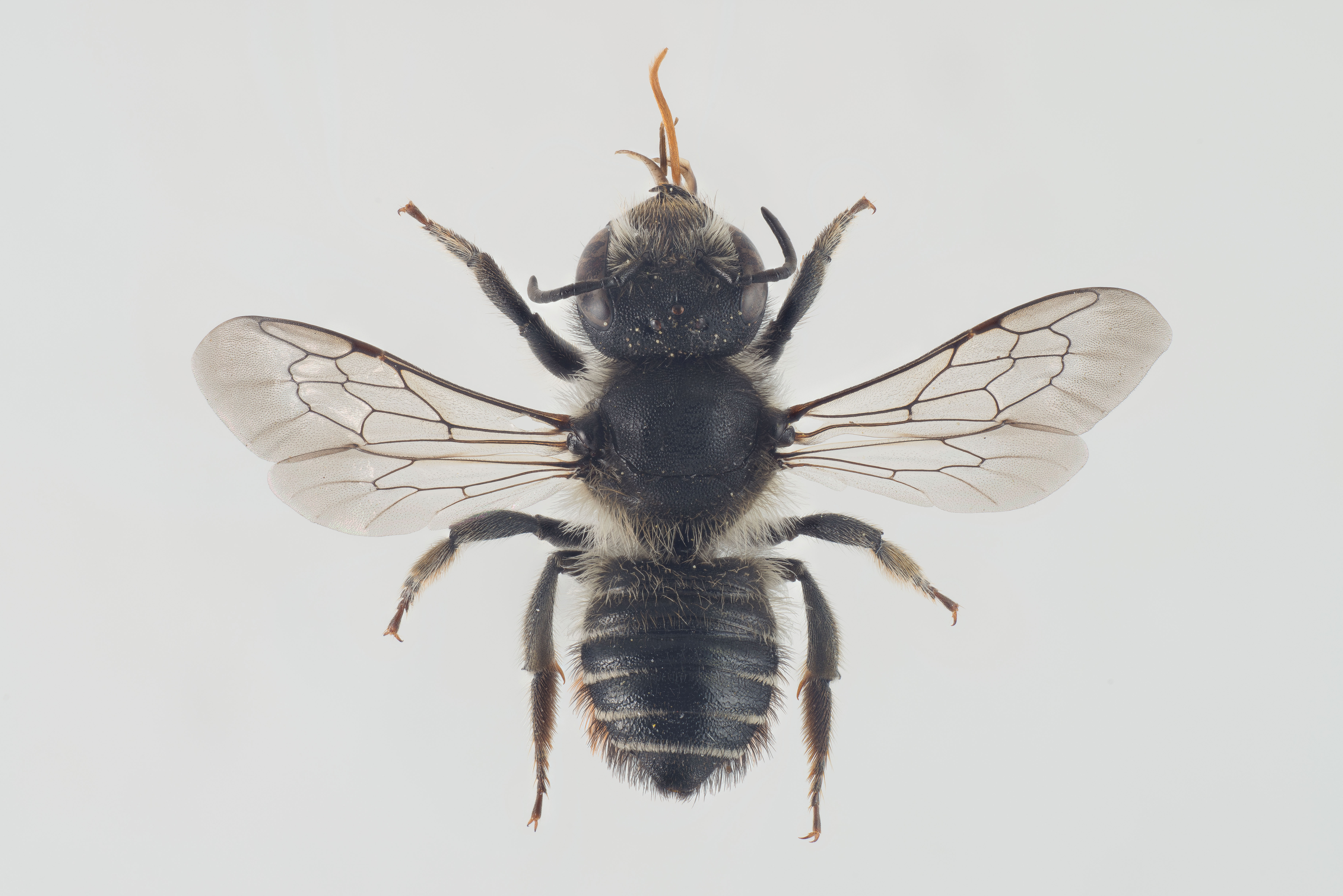

Scientific classification
- Domain: Eukaryota
- Kingdom: Animalia
- Phylum: Arthropoda
- Class: Insecta
- Order: Hymenoptera
- Family: Megachilidae
- Genus: Megachile
- Species: M. alpicola

Binomial name
- Megachile alpicola Alfken, 1924

= Megachile alpicola =

Species of leafcutter bee (Megachile)

Megachile alpicola is a species of bee in the family Megachilidae. It was described by Alfken in 1924.
