= Distocambarus devexus =

Conservation status
- Data Deficient (IUCN 3.1)

- Critically Imperiled (NatureServe)

Scientific classification
- Kingdom: Animalia
- Phylum: Arthropoda
- Class: Malacostraca
- Order: Decapoda
- Suborder: Pleocyemata
- Family: Cambaridae
- Genus: Distocambarus
- Species: D. devexus

Binomial name
- Distocambarus devexus (Hobbs, 1981)

Synonyms
- Procambarus (Distocambarus) devexus

Species of crayfish

Distocambarus devexus, the Broad River burrowing crayfish, is a species of crayfish in the family Cambaridae. It is endemic to Georgia. The common name refers to the Broad River.
