= Megachile canariensis =

Scientific classification
- Domain: Eukaryota
- Kingdom: Animalia
- Phylum: Arthropoda
- Class: Insecta
- Order: Hymenoptera
- Family: Megachilidae
- Genus: Megachile
- Species: M. canariensis

Binomial name
- Megachile canariensis Pérez, 1902

Species of leafcutter bee (Megachile)

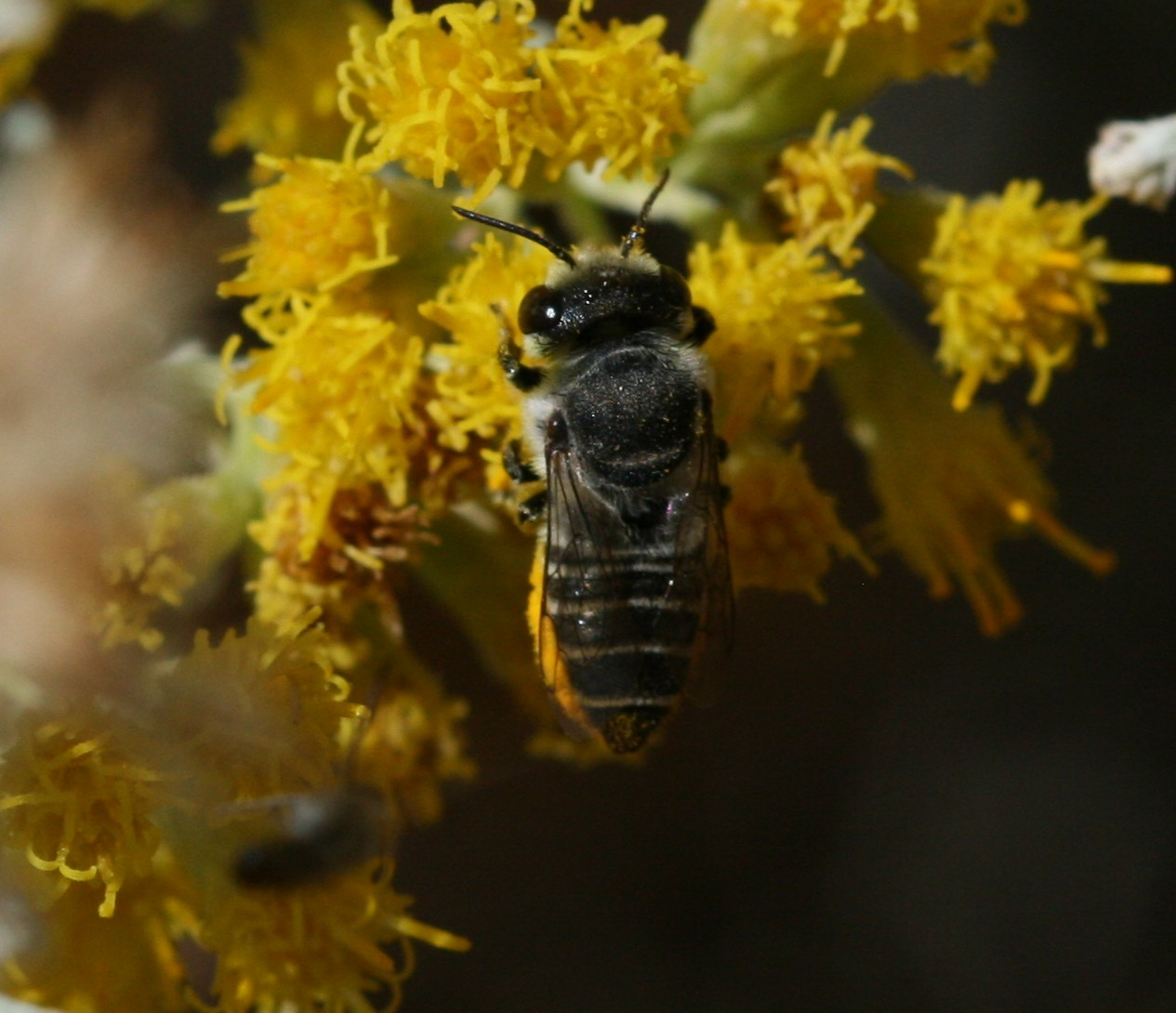
A species of Leafcutter Bee found in the Canary Islands

Megachile canariensis is a species of bee in the family Megachilidae. It was described by Pérez in 1839.
