= Megachile mavromoustakisi =

Scientific classification
- Domain: Eukaryota
- Kingdom: Animalia
- Phylum: Arthropoda
- Class: Insecta
- Order: Hymenoptera
- Family: Megachilidae
- Genus: Megachile
- Species: M. mavromoustakisi

Binomial name
- Megachile mavromoustakisi van der Zanden, 1992

Species of leafcutter bee (Megachile)

Megachile mavromoustakisi is a species of bee in the family Megachilidae. It was described by van der Zanden in 1992.
