= Cornigomphus guineensis =

Conservation status
- Least Concern (IUCN 3.1)

Scientific classification
- Kingdom: Animalia
- Phylum: Arthropoda
- Class: Insecta
- Order: Odonata
- Infraorder: Anisoptera
- Family: Gomphidae
- Genus: Cornigomphus
- Species: C. guineensis

Binomial name
- Cornigomphus guineensis Martin, 1907

Synonyms
- Tragogomphus guineensis (Martin, 1907)

Species of dragonfly

Cornigomphus guineensis is a species of dragonfly in the family Gomphidae. It is endemic to Equatorial Guinea.

Its natural habitat is subtropical or tropical moist lowland forests.
