= Mastigodiaptomus montezumae =

Conservation status
- Data Deficient (IUCN 2.3)

Scientific classification
- Kingdom: Animalia
- Phylum: Arthropoda
- Class: Copepoda
- Order: Calanoida
- Family: Diaptomidae
- Genus: Mastigodiaptomus
- Species: M. montezumae

Binomial name
- Mastigodiaptomus montezumae (Brehm, 1955)

Synonyms
- Diaptomus montezumae Brehm, 1955

Species of crustacean

Mastigodiaptomus montezumae is a species of calanoid copepod in the family Diaptomidae. It is native to central Mexico, where it can be found in high-altitude ponds and reservoirs.
