= Andrena suerinensis =

Scientific classification
- Kingdom: Animalia
- Phylum: Arthropoda
- Class: Insecta
- Order: Hymenoptera
- Family: Andrenidae
- Genus: Andrena
- Species: A. suerinensis

Binomial name
- Andrena suerinensis Friese, 1884

Species of bee

Andrena suerinensis is a species of insect belonging to the family Andrenidae.

It is native to Central Europe.
