= Paracoptochirus singularis =

Scientific classification
- Kingdom: Animalia
- Phylum: Arthropoda
- Clade: Pancrustacea
- Class: Insecta
- Order: Coleoptera
- Suborder: Polyphaga
- Infraorder: Scarabaeiformia
- Family: Scarabaeidae
- Genus: Paracoptochirus
- Species: P. singularis

Binomial name
- Paracoptochirus singularis (Harold, 1868)

Synonyms
- Coptochirus singularis Harold, 1868; Coptochirus haemonius Reitter, 1903; Aphodius furvus Erichson, 1848

Species of beetle

Paracoptochirus singularis is a species of beetle of the family Scarabaeidae. It is found in Greece, Israel, Romania, Turkey and Ukraine.

== Description ==
Adults reach a length of about 7–8 mm (0.28–0.31 in). They have an oval-elongate, sub-shiny, moderately convex, shortly pubescent, piceous-reddish body. The margin of the clypeus and the sides and apex of the elytra are paler. The legs are piceous and the antennae are reddish with a brownish club.

== Life history ==
This species is thought to live in burrows or nests of Spermophilus species.
