= Andrena cervina =

Conservation status
- Data Deficient (IUCN 3.1)

Scientific classification
- Domain: Eukaryota
- Kingdom: Animalia
- Phylum: Arthropoda
- Class: Insecta
- Order: Hymenoptera
- Family: Andrenidae
- Genus: Andrena
- Species: A. cervina

Binomial name
- Andrena cervina (Warncke, 1975)

Species of bee

Andrena cervina is a species of bee, belonging to the family Andrenidae. The species is endemic to Cyprus.
