= Megachile pugillatoria =

Scientific classification
- Domain: Eukaryota
- Kingdom: Animalia
- Phylum: Arthropoda
- Class: Insecta
- Order: Hymenoptera
- Family: Megachilidae
- Genus: Megachile
- Species: M. pugillatoria

Binomial name
- Megachile pugillatoria Costa, 1863

Species of leafcutter bee (Megachile)

Megachile pugillatoria is a species of bee in the family Megachilidae. It was described by Costa in 1863.
