= Megachile dacica =

Scientific classification
- Domain: Eukaryota
- Kingdom: Animalia
- Phylum: Arthropoda
- Class: Insecta
- Order: Hymenoptera
- Family: Megachilidae
- Genus: Megachile
- Species: M. dacica

Binomial name
- Megachile dacica Mocsáry, 1879

Species of leafcutter bee (Megachile)

Megachile dacica is a species of bee in the family Megachilidae. It was described by Mocsáry in 1879.
