= Onthophagus amphioxus =

Scientific classification
- Kingdom: Animalia
- Phylum: Arthropoda
- Clade: Pancrustacea
- Class: Insecta
- Order: Coleoptera
- Suborder: Polyphaga
- Infraorder: Scarabaeiformia
- Family: Scarabaeidae
- Genus: Onthophagus
- Species: O. amphioxus

Binomial name
- Onthophagus amphioxus (Arrow, 1933)

Species of insect

Onthophagus amphioxus is a species of insect in the genus Onthophagus of the family Scarabaeidae in the order Coleoptera.

== Taxonomy ==
It was described in 1933 by Arrow.
