= Griseargiolestes bucki =

Turquoise flatwing

Conservation status
- Vulnerable (IUCN 3.1)

Scientific classification
- Kingdom: Animalia
- Phylum: Arthropoda
- Clade: Pancrustacea
- Class: Insecta
- Order: Odonata
- Suborder: Zygoptera
- Family: Argiolestidae
- Genus: Griseargiolestes
- Species: G. bucki

Binomial name
- Griseargiolestes bucki Theischinger, 1998

Species of damselfly

Griseargiolestes bucki is a species of Australian damselfly in the family Argiolestidae, commonly known as a turquoise flatwing. It is endemic to the Barrington Tops area of New South Wales, where it inhabits streams, bogs and seepages.

Griseargiolestes bucki is a medium-sized damselfly, black-green metallic in colour with pale markings, and slightly pruinescent. Like other members of the family Argiolestidae, it rests with its wings outspread.

Griseargiolestes bucki appears similar to Griseargiolestes albescens, which is found in coastal areas of north-eastern New South Wales and south-eastern Queensland.

== Etymology ==
The genus name Griseargiolestes combines the Latin griseus ("grey" or "pearl-grey") with Argiolestes, the name of a related genus. It refers to the pale pruinescence seen in this group.

In 1998, Günther Theischinger named this species bucki, an eponym honouring – Klaus Buck (1923-2006) of Wilster, Germany, a prolific photographer of Australian dragonflies.

== Gallery ==
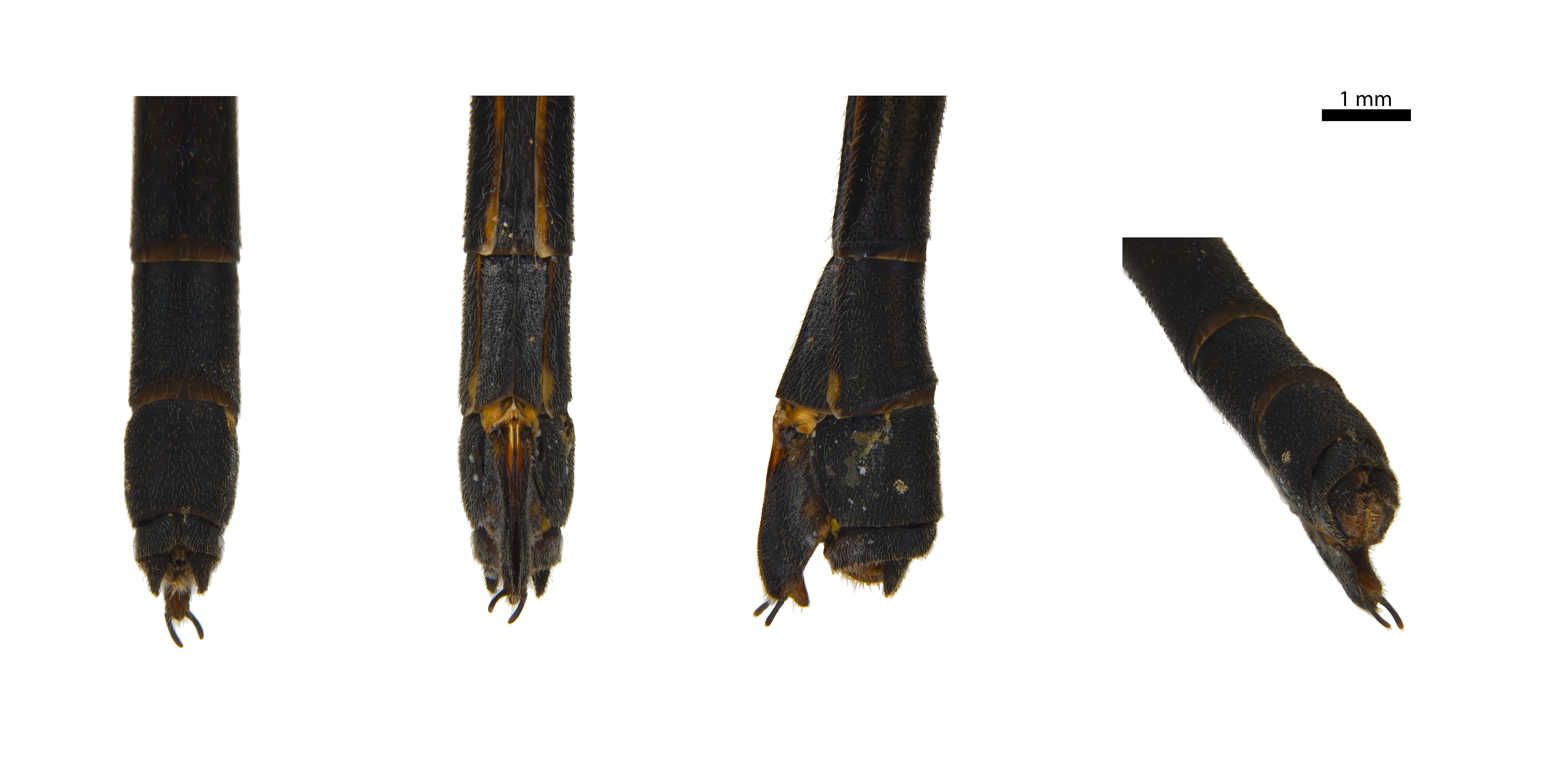
Tip of female tail

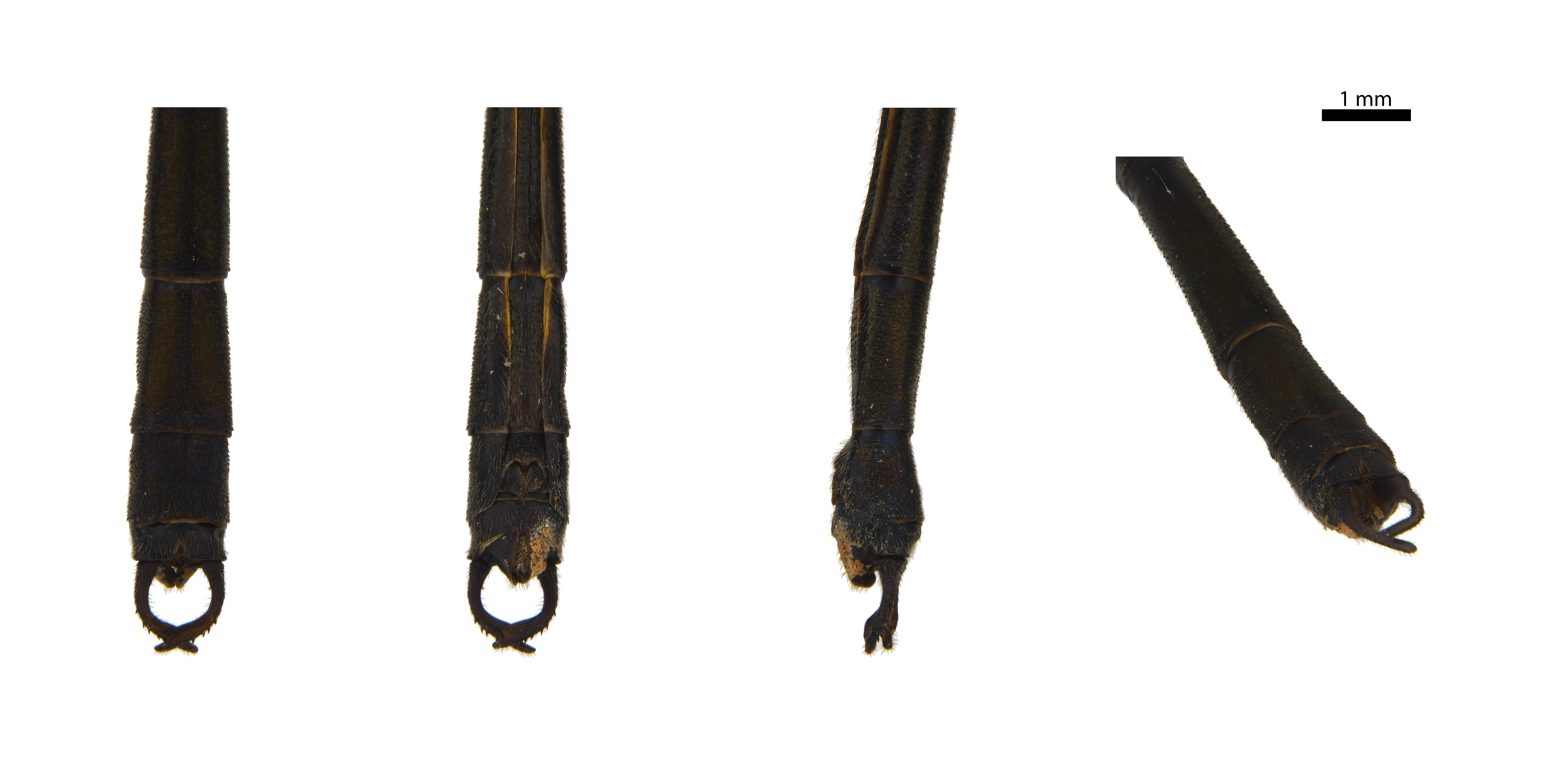
Tip of male tail

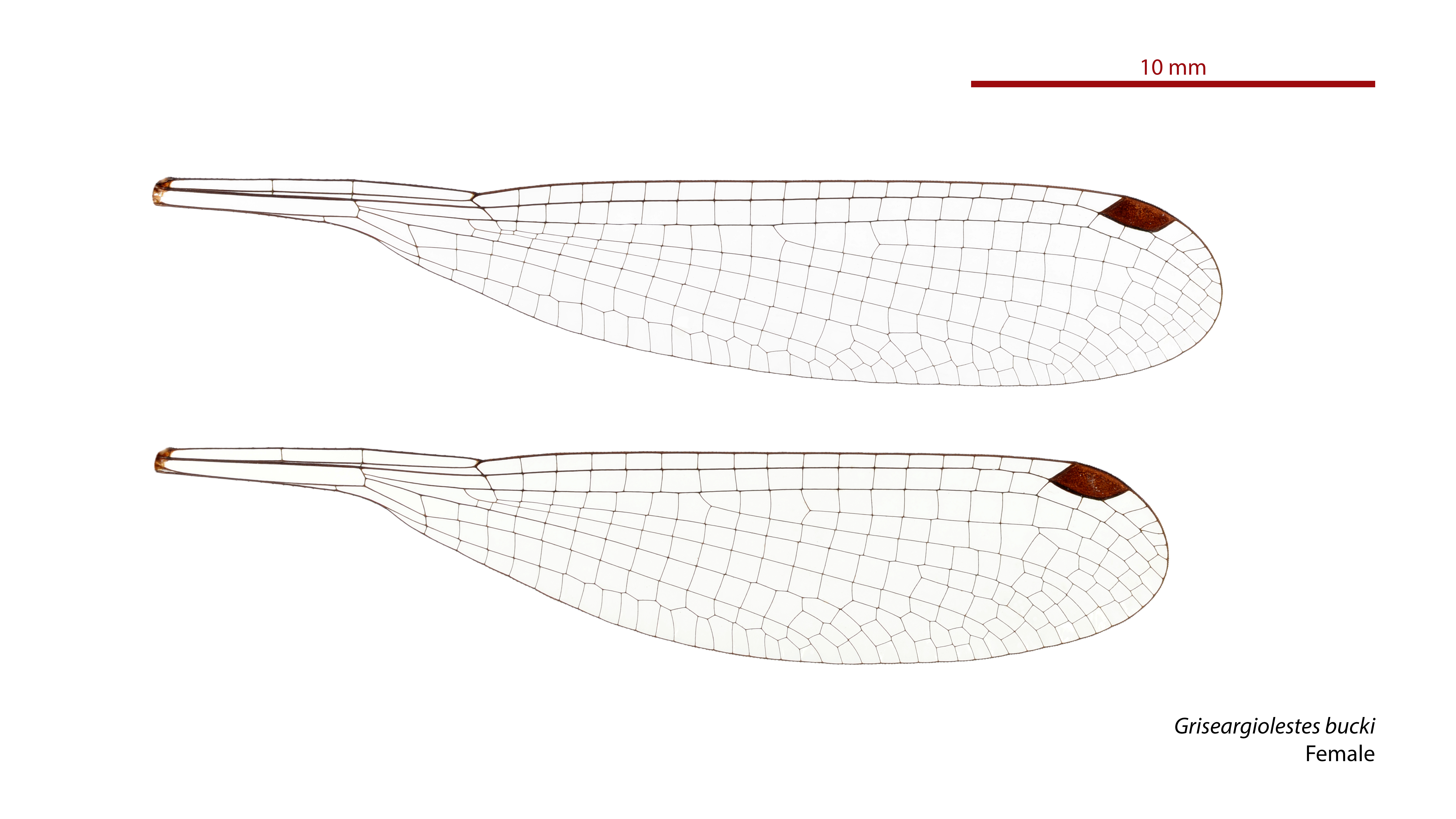
Female wings

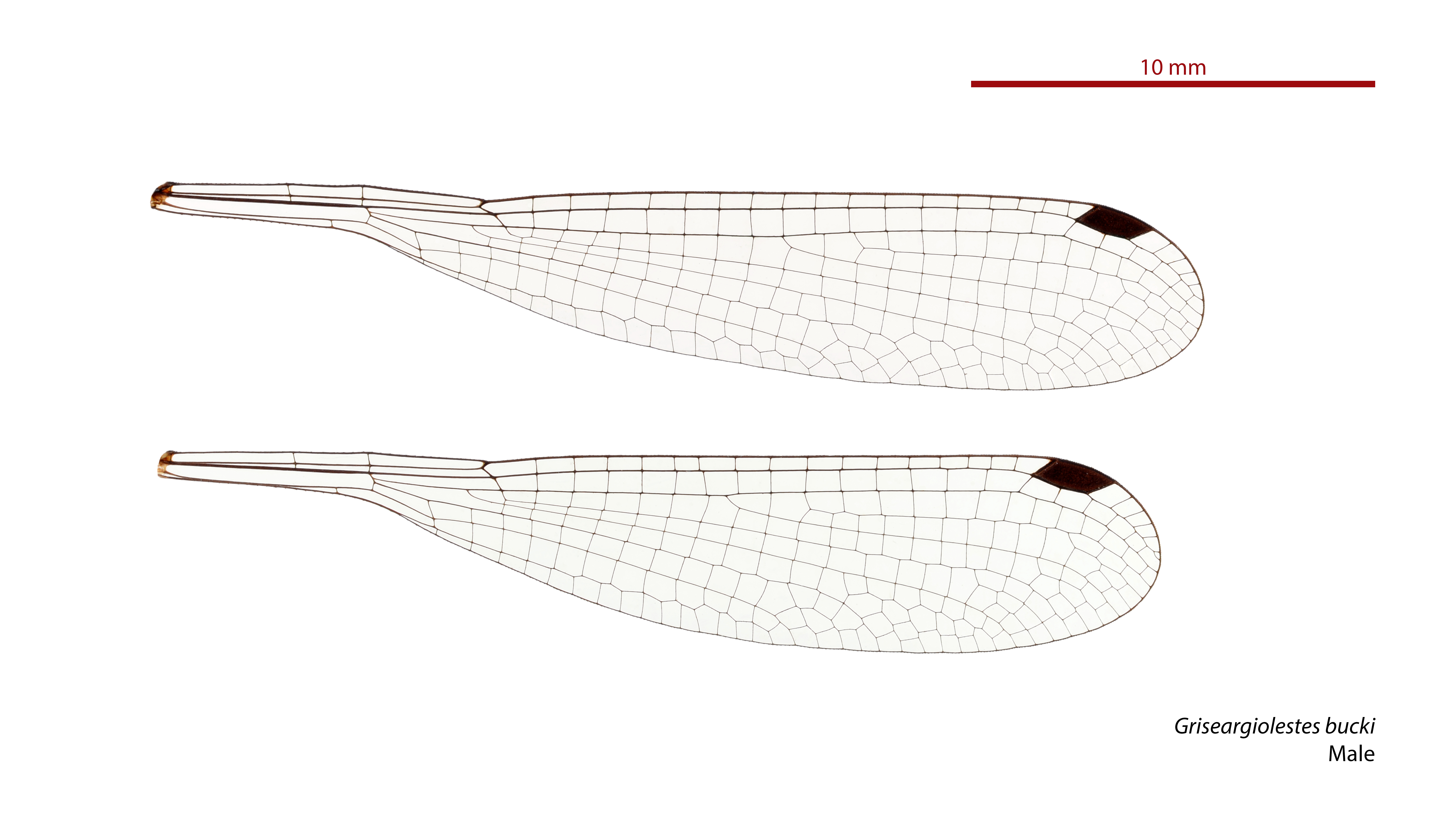
Male wings

== See also ==
- List of Odonata species of Australia
