= Gilberto Rodríguez (zoologist) =

Venezuelan zoologist (1929–2004)

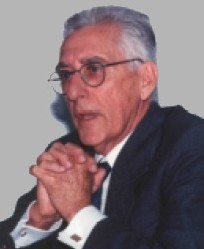
- Venezuelan carcinologist
- Born: Gilberto Domingo Rodríguez Ramírez; May 12, 1929; Caracas, Venezuela
- Died: May 16, 2004 (aged 75); Caracas, Venezuela

Gilberto Domingo Rodríguez Ramírez (12 May 1929 – 16 May 2004) was a Venezuelan carcinologist. Rodríguez is considered one of the contemporary figures of Venezuelan natural sciences who most contributed to their development in the country. His studies on the ecology of estuaries are recognized as worldwide references. Likewise, his carcinological studies on the family Pseudothelphusidae earned him recognition as an international researcher.

== Biography ==
He attended primary school at Colegio la Salle in Caracas and graduated from Liceo Andrés Bello. In 1955, he obtained a degree in Sciences from the Central University of Venezuela.

While studying at the Central University of Venezuela, in 1954 he published his first works in Acta Biologica Venezuelica and Boletín de la Sociedad Venezolana de Ciencias Naturales, both focused on the genus Heliconia. He continued with several works on Myxomycetes. Venezuelan scientists later acknowledged his impact.

After graduation, he pursued a master's in marine biology at the University of Miami (1955–1958). During his studies, he trained at the Marine Biological Association Laboratory in Plymouth, at the Scottish Marine Station in Millport, and at the University of Copenhagen in Denmark.

He served as lead scientist of the South Pacific Expedition in Chile.

In 1958, he presented his master's thesis, published in 1959 as “The marine communities of Margarita Island, Venezuela”, which is considered the first modern ecological study in Venezuela.

In 1959, back in Venezuela, Rodríguez participated in founding the "Instituto Oceanográfico" of the Universidad de Oriente in Cumaná, serving as deputy director. In 1960 he returned to Caracas to work at the Venezuelan Institute for Scientific Research (IVIC), where in 1963 he founded the Department of Hydrobiology. This group studied the Lake Maracaibo ecosystem, producing fundamental publications.

In 1964 he was guest at the National Autonomous University of Mexico, where he studied freshwater crabs and described a new species (Rodriguezia villalobosi). In 1967 he presented at the International Symposium on Coastal Lagoons with his work on zooplankton in the Maracaibo estuary.

In 1968 he pursued a PhD at the University of Wales, completing his dissertation “Behavioural rhythms in littoral prawns” in 1970. He returned to IVIC and transformed the Hydrobiology Department into the Center for Ecology, recruiting leading Venezuelan ecologists such as Carlos Schubert, Ernesto Medina and Jorge Rabinovich.

Rodríguez also taught at the Universidad de Oriente and at the Central University of Venezuela, where he founded the chair of Marine Biology (1959–1978). He also taught ecology at the IVIC postgraduate program.

Rodríguez died in Caracas on 16 May 2004 at age 75. He is remembered for his many scientific contributions.

== Carcinology ==
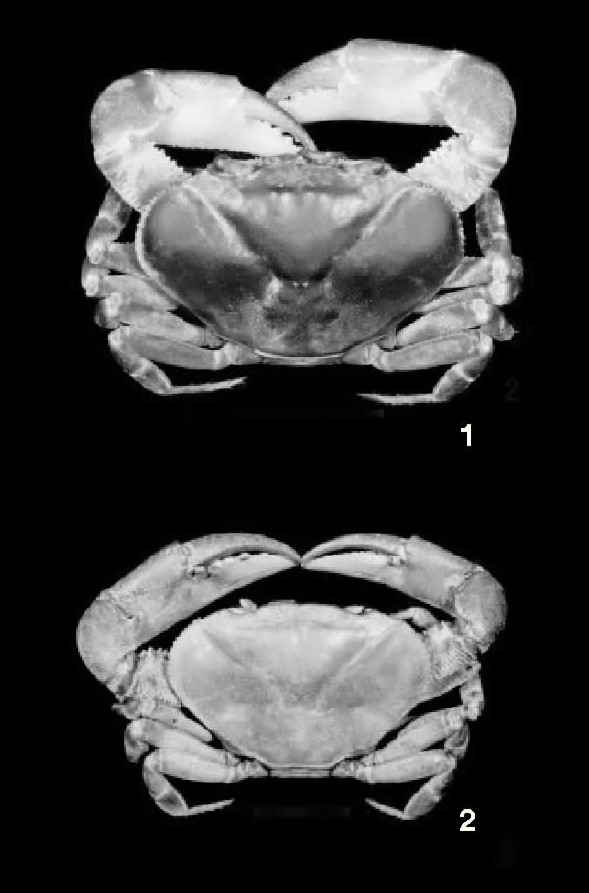
1. Freditus fittkauit, 2 Fredius platycanthus (Decapoda: Pseudothelphusidae).

Rodríguez made major contributions both to the ecology of estuaries and to carcinology. His first studies were on Venezuelan marine decapods, culminating in the 1980 book Los crustáceos decápodos de Venezuela.

He described nine new genera and 82 new species of freshwater crabs and shrimps, clarified their taxonomy and biogeography, and revealed the existence of pseudolungs in freshwater crabs together with Dr. Humberto Díaz. His monographs on Pseudothelphusidae and Trichodactylidae are considered fundamental.

At IVIC he established a world-class reference collection of decapods, particularly freshwater crabs.

He also served on editorial boards, including:

- Permanent member of the editorial board of Crustaceana (Leiden, Netherlands)
- Governor for South America of The Crustacean Society of Washington
- Member of the editorial boards of Acta Biologica Venezuelica, Acta Científica Venezolana, Amazoniana, Journal of Crustacean Biology, Journal of Natural History, Revista de Biología Tropical, among others.

== Honors and recognition ==
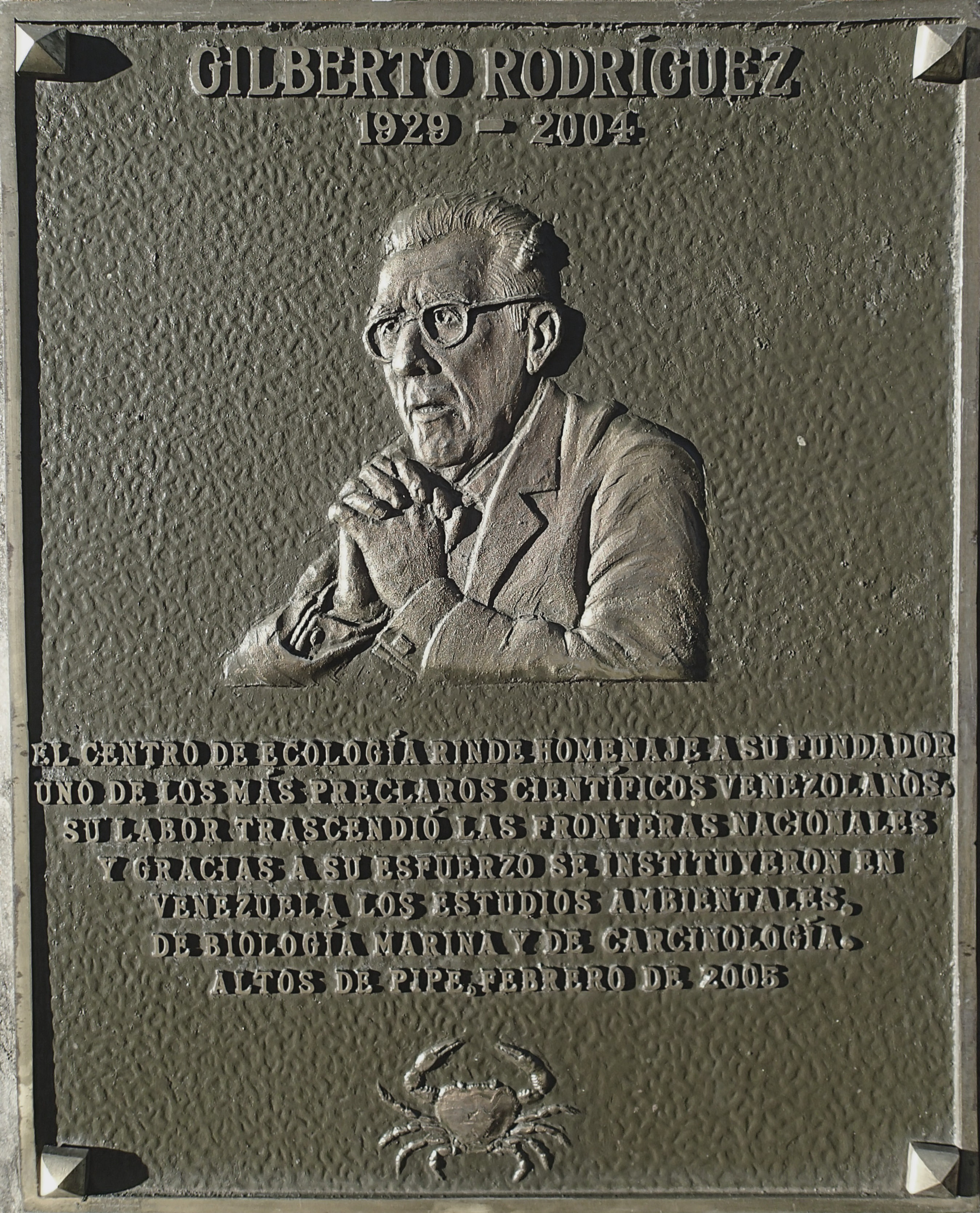
Commemorative plaque for Gilberto Rodríguez at the Center for Ecology of IVIC

=== Eponyms ===
The Venezuelan carcinologist Guido Pereira dedicated a shrimp species of the family Palaemonidae to him: Macrobrachium rodriguezi.

The German carcinologist Pretzmann also named a freshwater crab Microthelphusa rodriguezi in his honor.

=== Other activities ===
Beyond academia, Rodríguez held several positions:

- Member, National Agricultural Research Council (1968–1969)
- Representative of the Ministry of Education to the University of Oriente Board (1970–1971)
- Venezuelan delegate to the UN Conference on the Law of the Sea (1971–1979)
- Advisor at the Venezuelan Institute of Petroleum Technology (INTEVEP) (1991–1995)
- Member of the restructuring commission of IVIC (1998)
- Coordinator, PDVSA commission on the restoration of Lake Maracaibo (1998)

== Species described by Gilberto Rodríguez ==
=== Botanical species ===
- Heliconia schaeferiana Rodríguez, 1954
- Heliconia aurea Rodríguez, 1954
- Heliconia nana Rodríguez, 1954

=== Zoological species ===
==== Family Palaemonidae ====
- Macrobrachium aracamuni Rodríguez, 1982
- Macrobrachium cortezi Rodríguez, 1982

==== Family Trichodactylidae ====
- Dilocarcinus bulbifer Rodríguez, 1992
- Dilocarcinus medemi Smalley & Rodríguez, 1972
- Dilocarcinus truncatus Rodríguez, 1992
- Rodriguezia villalobosi Rodríguez & Manrique, 1967
- Trichodactylus kensleyi Rodríguez, 1992

==== Family Pseudothelphusidae ====
- Chaceus caecus Rodríguez & Bosque, 1989
- Chaceus cesari Rodríguez & Viloria, 1990
- Chaceus motiloni Rodríguez 1980
- Chaceus nasutus Rodríguez 1980
- Chaceus turikensis Rodríguez & Herrera, 1994
- Epilobocera wetherbi Rodríguez & Williams, 1994
- Epithelplusa chiapensis Rodríguez & Smalley, 1969
- Epithelplusa mixtepensis Rodríguez & Smalley, 1969
- Eudaniela ranchograndensis Rodríguez, 1966
- Eudaniela trujillensis Rodríguez, 1967
- Fredius adpressus adpressus Rodríguez & Pereira 1992
- Fredius adpressus piaroensis Rodríguez & Pereira 1992
- Fredius cuaoensis Rodríguez & Suárez
- Fredius estevesi estevesi Rodríguez 1966
- Fredius granulatus Rodríguez & Campos, 1998.
- Fredius orinoccensis Rodríguez 1966. Sinónimo de Fredius chaffanjoni Rathbun, 1905
- Fredius estevesi siapensis Rodríguez & Pereira 1992
- Fredius platyacahthus Rodríguez & Pereira 1992
- Fredius stenolobus Rodríguez & Suárez, 1994
- Fredius sucrensis Rodríguez & Campos, 2000
- Hypolobocera barbacensis Campos, Magalhães & Rodríguez, 2002
- Hypolobocera bouvieri stenolobata Rodríguez, 1980
- Hypolobocera bouvieri rotundilobata Rodríguez, 1994
- Hypolobocera brevipenis Rodríguez & Díaz, 1981
- Hypolobocera chocoensis Rodríguez, 1980
- Hypolobocera dantae Rodríguez & Suárez, 2004
- Hypolobocera enberarum Campos & Rodríguez, 1995
- Hypolobocera esemraldensis Rodríguez y Sternberg, 1998
- Hypolobocera kansarum Campos y Rodríguez, 1995
- Hypolobocera konstanzae Rodríguez & Sternberg, 1998
- Hypolobocera mindonensis Rodríguez & Sternberg, 1998
- Hypolobocera muisnensis Rodríguez & Sternberg, 1998
- Hypolobocera noanamensis Rodríguez, Campos y López, 2002
- Hypolobocera quevedensis Rodríguez & Díaz, 1981. Sinónimo de Hypolobocera caputti, (Nobili, 1901)
- Hypolobocera riveti Rodríguez, 1980
- Hypolobocera ucayalensis Rodríguez & Suárez, 2004
- Lindacatalina brevipenis Rodríguez & Díaz, 1981
- Lindacatalina sinuensis Rodríguez, Campos et López, 2002
- Lindacatalina sumacensis Rodríguez et Sternberg, 1998
- Lobithelphusa mexican Rodríguez, 1982
- Microthelphusa aracamuniensis Rodríguez & Suárez, 2001
- Microthelphusa barinensis Rodríguez, 1980
- Microthelphusa bolivari Rodríguez, 1980
- Microthelphusa ginesi Rodríguez & Estéves, 1972
- Microthelphusa guaiquinimaensis Rodríguez & Suárez, 2001
- Microthelphusa maigualidaensis Rodríguez & Suárez, 2001
- Microthelphusa marahuacensis Rodríguez & Suárez
- Microthelphusa racenesi Rodríguez, 1966
- Microthelphusa turumikiri Rodríguez, 1980
- Moristchus altaquerensis Rodríguez, Campos et López, 2002
- Moristchus caucasensis Campos Magalhães et Rodríguez, 2002
- Neostrengeria botti Rodríguez et Türkay, 1977
- Neostrengeria boyacensis Rodríguez, 1980
- Neostrengeria lasallei Rodríguez, 1980
- Neostrengeria libradensis Rodríguez, 1980
- Oedothelphusa orientalis Rodríguez, 1980
- Orthothelphusa holthuisi Rodríguez, 1967
- Potamocarcinus roatensis Rodríguez, & López, 2003
- Potamocarcinus vulcanensis Rodríguez, 2001
- Prionothelphusa eliasi Rodríguez, 1980
- Pseudothelphusa contorta Rodríguez, 1966. Sinónimo de Fredius beccarii Coifmann, 1939
- Pseudothelphusa granatensis Rodríguez et Smalley, 1969
- Pseudothelphusa leiophrys Rodríguez & Smalley 1969
- Pseudothelphusa lophophallus Rodríguez et Smalley, 1969
- Pseudothelphusa peyotensis Rodríguez & Smalley 1969
- Pseudothelphusa sonorae Rodríguez &Smalley, 1969
- Ptychophalus barbillaensis Rodríguez, & Hedströn, 2000
- Ptychophalus micracanthus Rodríguez, 1994
- Strengeriana cajaensis Campos & Rodríguez, 1993
- Strengeriana flagellata Campos & Rodríguez, 1993
- Strengeriana foresti Rodríguez, 1980
- Strengeriana maniformis Campos & Rodríguez, 1993
- Strengeriana restrepoi Rodríguez, 1980
- Strengeriana tolimensis Rodríguez & Díaz, 1981
- Tehuana veracruzuna Rodríguez et Smalley, 1969
