= List of decapod crustaceans of Dominica =

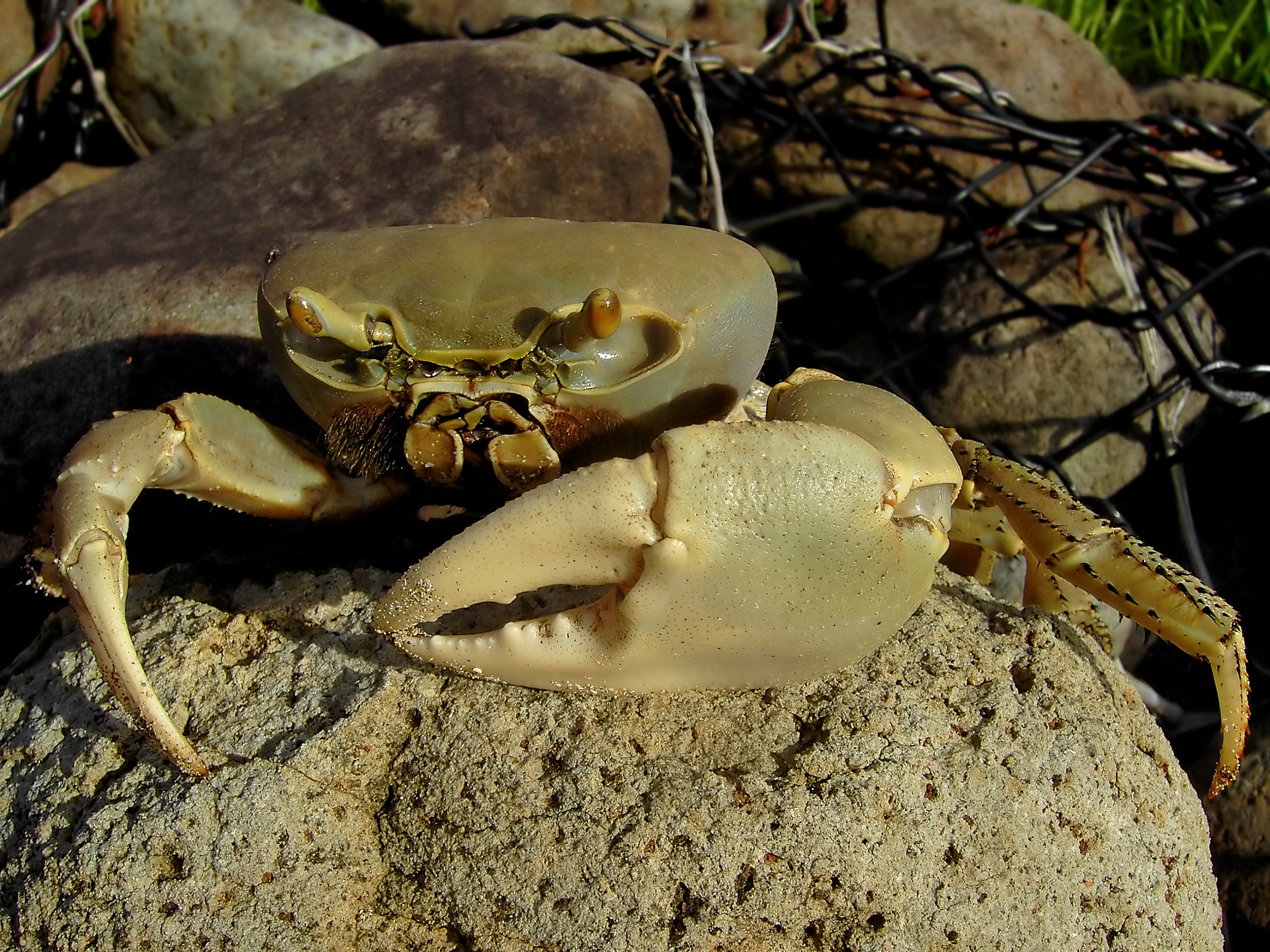
Cardisoma guanhumi, Woodford Hill, Dominica

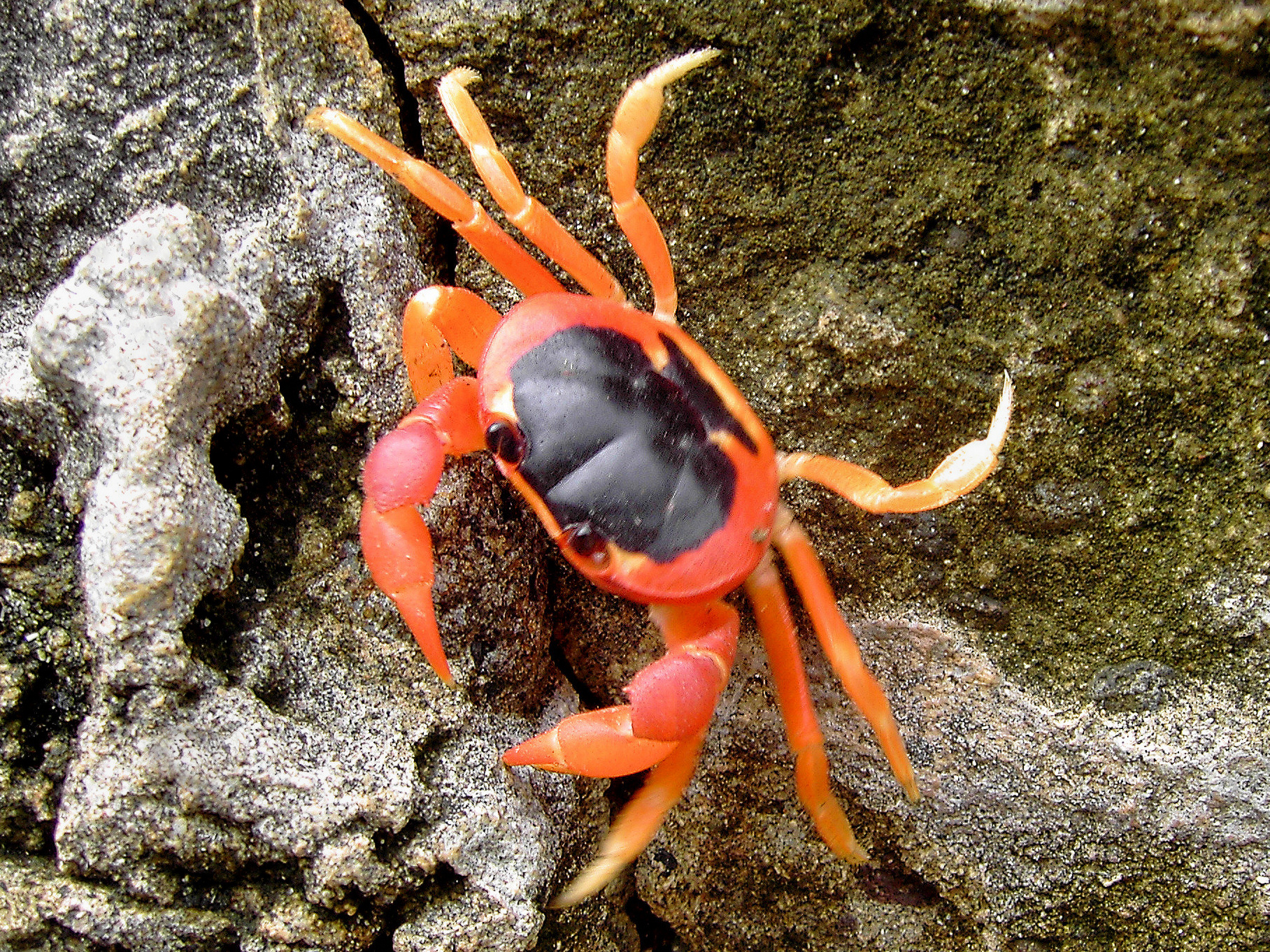
Gecarcinus lateralis, Woodford Hill

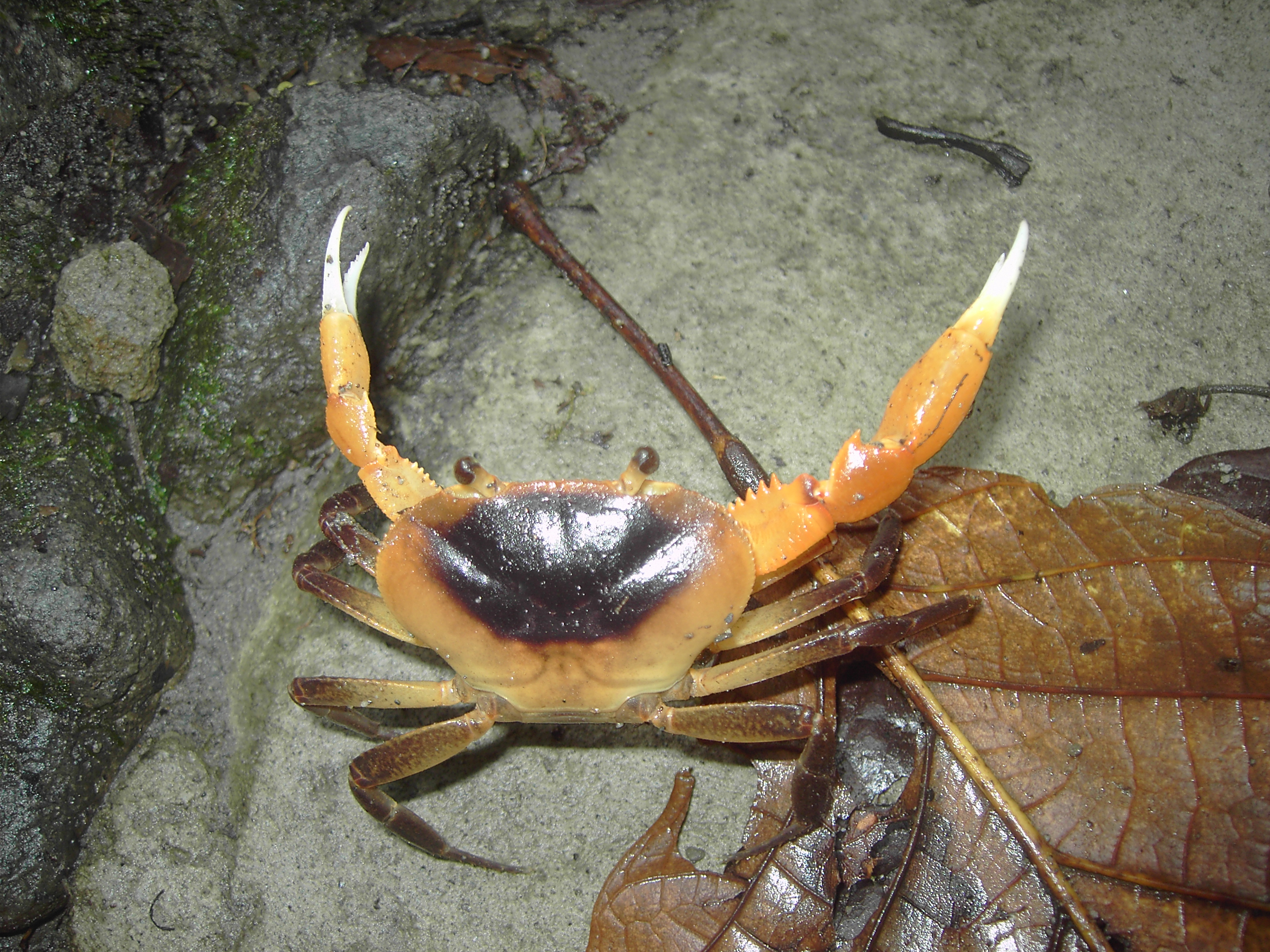
Guinotia dentata, Emerald Pool, Dominica

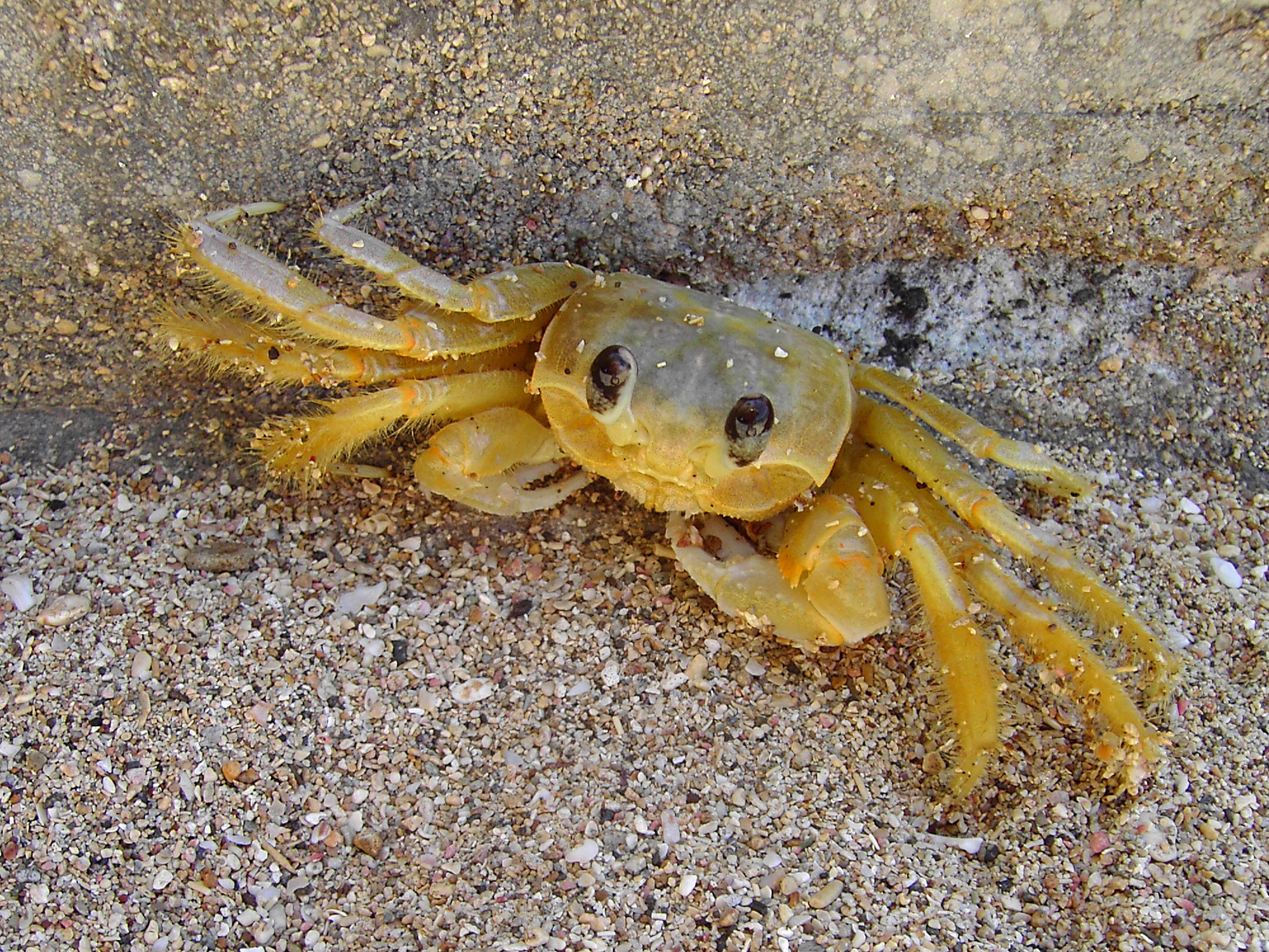
Atlantic ghost crab (Ocypode quadrata), Calibishie, Dominica

Thirty-two species of decapod crustaceans have been recorded in Dominica, an island nation in the Caribbean Lesser Antilles. This includes eighteen species of true crabs (infraorder Brachyura); three species of hermit crab; one species of porcelain crab (infraorder Anomura); and eleven species of freshwater shrimp (infraorder Caridea).

== Infraorder Anomura (hermit crabs and porcelain crabs) ==
Family Coenobitidae

- Caribbean hermit crab Coenobita cypleatus

Family Lithodidae

- Lithodes manningi

Family Porcellanidae

- Petrolisthes quadratus

== Infraorder Brachyura (true crabs) ==
Family Gecarcinidae

- Cardisoma guanhumi
- Gecarcinus lateralis
- Gecarcinus ruricola

Family Grapsidae

- Geograpsus lividus
- Goniopsis cruentata
- Grapsus grapsus

Family Ocypodidae

- Ocypode quadrata
- Uca burgersi
- Uca vocator
- Ucides cordatus

Family Plagusiidae

- Plagusia depressa

Family Portunidae

- Callinectes bocourti
- Callinectes marginatus
- Callinectes sapidus

Family Pseudothelphusidae

- Guinotia dentata

Family Sesarmidae

- Sesarma miersii
- Sesarma robertii

Family Varunidae

- Cyclograpsus integer

== Infraorder Caridea (shrimp) ==
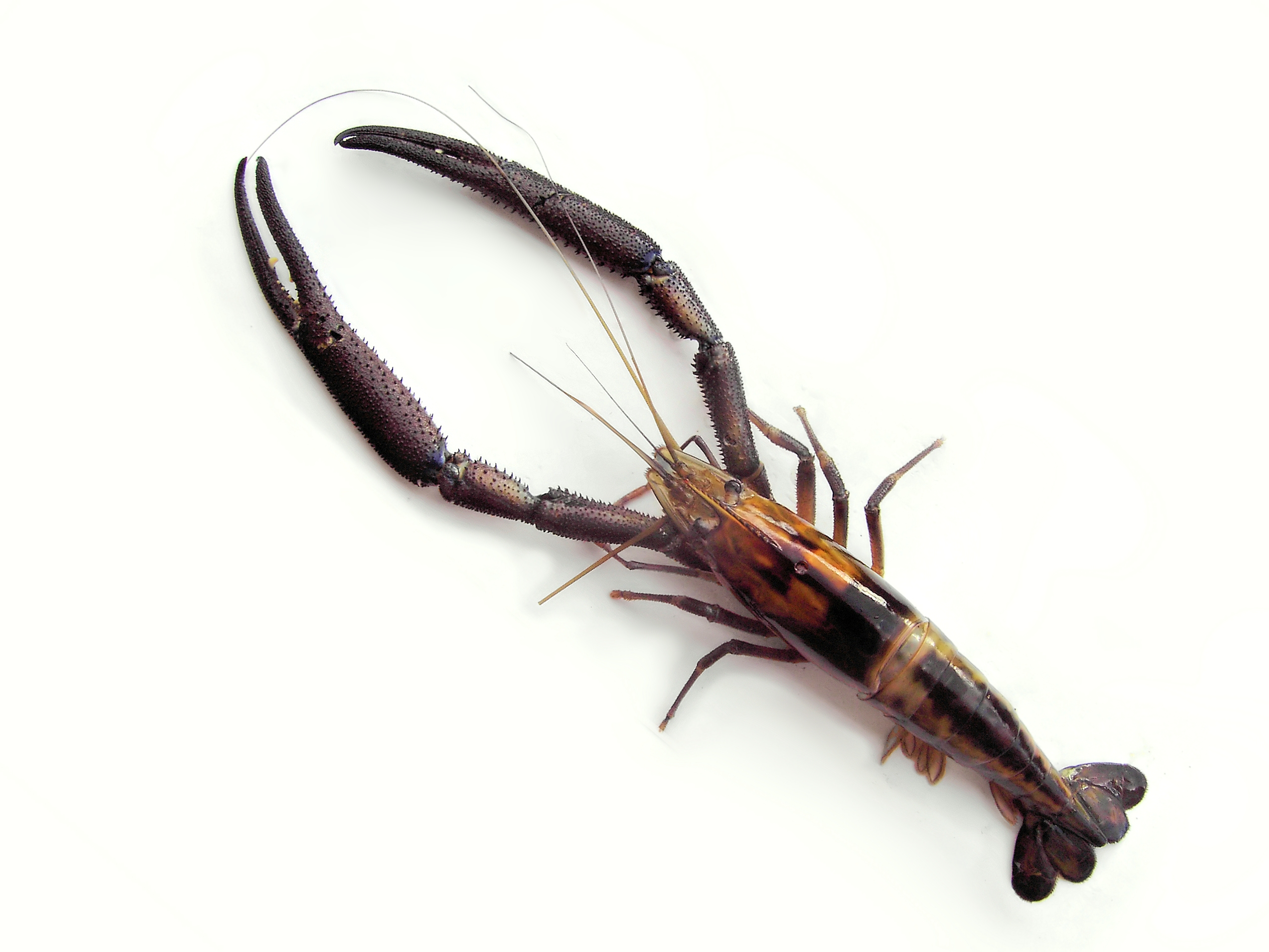
Macrobrachium carcinus specimen from Dominica

Family Atyidae

- Atya innocous
- Atya scabra
- Jonga serrei
- Micratya poeyi
- Potimirim glabra
- Xiphocaris elongata

Family Palaemonidae

- Macrobrachium acanthurus
- Macrobrachium carcinus
- Macrobrachium crenulatum
- Macrobrachium faustinum
- Macrobrachium heterochirus
