= Hypolobocera =

Scientific classification
- Kingdom: Animalia
- Phylum: Arthropoda
- Class: Malacostraca
- Order: Decapoda
- Suborder: Pleocyemata
- Infraorder: Brachyura
- Family: Pseudothelphusidae
- Genus: Hypolobocera; Ortmann, 1897

Genus of crabs

Hypolobocera is a genus of freshwater crabs in the family Pseudothelphusidae, found in Venezuela, Colombia, Ecuador, and Peru. The major and future threats to these species include human-induced habitat loss/degradation and water pollution.

== Species ==
It containing the following species:

- Hypolobocera aequatorialis (Ortmann, 1897)
- Hypolobocera alata Campos, 1989
- Hypolobocera andagoensis (Pretzmann, 1965)
- Hypolobocera barbacensis Campos, Malgahães & Rodríguez, 2002
- Hypolobocera beieri Pretzmann, 1968
- Hypolobocera bouvieri (Rathbun, 1898)
- Hypolobocera buenaventurensis (Rathbun, 1905)
- Hypolobocera cajambrensis von Prahl, 1988
- Hypolobocera canaensis Pretzmann, 1968
- Hypolobocera caputii (Nobili, 1901)
- Hypolobocera chilensis (Lucas, in H. Milne Edwards & Lucas, 1844)
- Hypolobocera chocoensis Rodríguez, 1980
- Hypolobocera conradi (Rathbun, 1905)
- Hypolobocera dantae Rodríguez & Suárez, 2004
- Hypolobocera dentata von Prahl, 1987
- Hypolobocera emberara Campos & Rodríguez, 1995
- Hypolobocera esmeraldensis Rodríguez & von Sternberg, 1998
- Hypolobocera exuca Pretzmann, 1977
- Hypolobocera gibberimana Pretzmann, 1968
- Hypolobocera gorgonensis von Prahl, 1983
- Hypolobocera guayaquilensis Bott, 1967
- Hypolobocera hauserae Pretzmann, 1977
- Hypolobocera ituangoensis Campos & Alexander, 2024
- Hypolobocera kamsarum Campos & Rodríguez, 1995
- Hypolobocera konstanzae Rodríguez & von Sternberg, 1998
- Hypolobocera lamercedes Pretzmann, 1978
- Hypolobocera lloroensis Campos, 1989
- Hypolobocera malaguena von Prahl, 1988
- Hypolobocera martelathani (Pretzmann, 1965)
- Hypolobocera meineli von Prahl, 1988
- Hypolobocera mindonensis Rodríguez & von Sternberg, 1998
- Hypolobocera murindensis Campos, 2003
- Hypolobocera mutisi von Prahl, 1988
- Hypolobocera niceforoi Schmitt, 1969
- Hypolobocera noanamensis Rodríguez, Campos & López, 2002
- Hypolobocera orcesi Pretzmann, 1978
- Hypolobocera rathbuni Pretzmann, 1968
- Hypolobocera rotundilobata Rodríguez, 1994
- Hypolobocera smalleyi Pretzmann, 1968
- Hypolobocera steindachneri Pretzmann, 1968
- Hypolobocera ucayalensis Rodríguez & Suárez, 2004
- Hypolobocera velezi Campos, 2003
