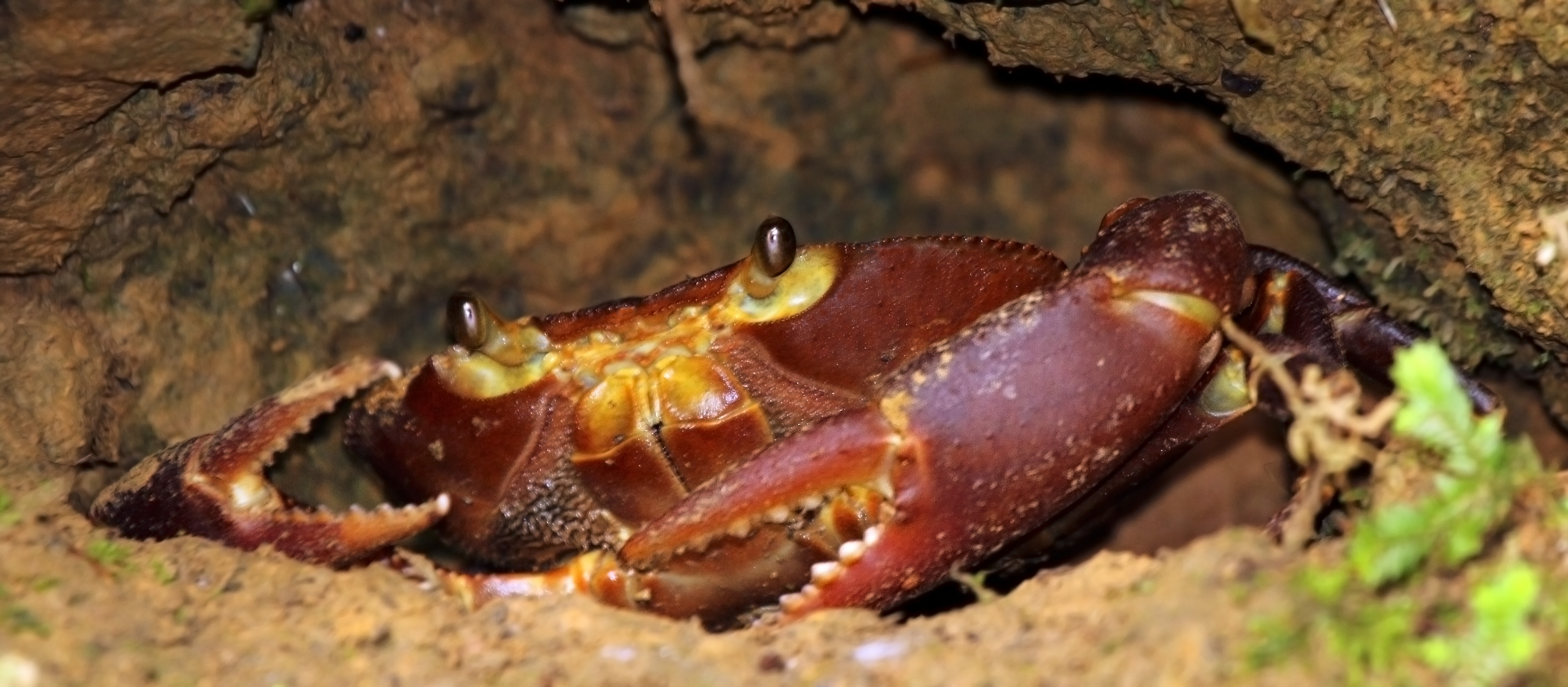
- Adult Rodriguezus garmani, Trinidad

Scientific classification
- Domain: Eukaryota
- Kingdom: Animalia
- Phylum: Arthropoda
- Class: Malacostraca
- Order: Decapoda
- Suborder: Pleocyemata
- Infraorder: Brachyura
- Family: Pseudothelphusidae
- Genus: Rodriguezus; Campos & Magalhães, 2005

= Rodriguezus =

Genus of crabs

Rodriguezus is a genus of crabs in the family Pseudothelphusidae, containing the following species:

- Rodriguezus garmani (Rathbun, 1898)
- Rodriguezus iturbei (Rathbun, 1919)
- Rodriguezus ranchograndensis (Rodríguez, 1966)
- Rodriguezus trujillensis (Rodríguez, 1967)
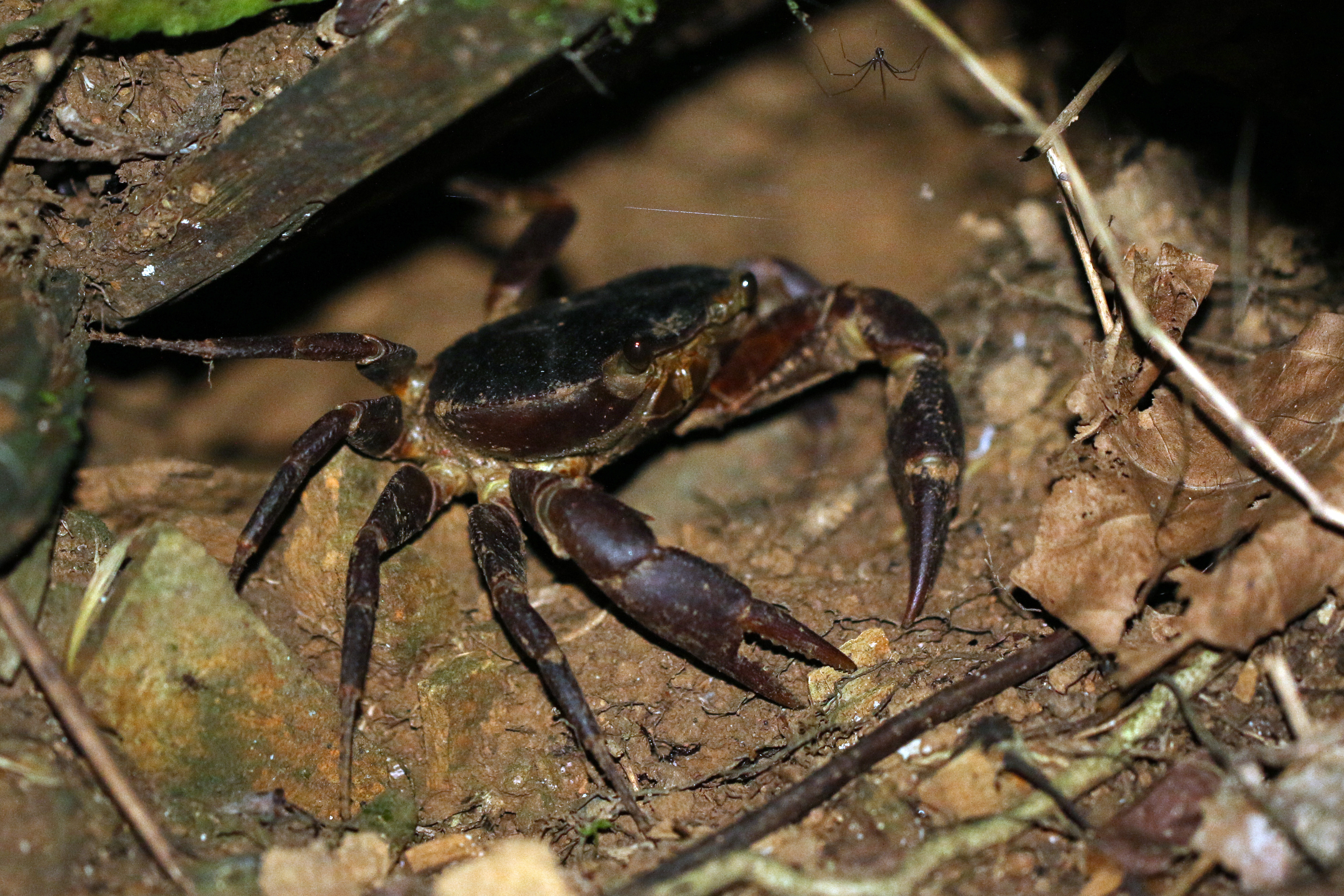
Juvenile R. garmani
Trinidad

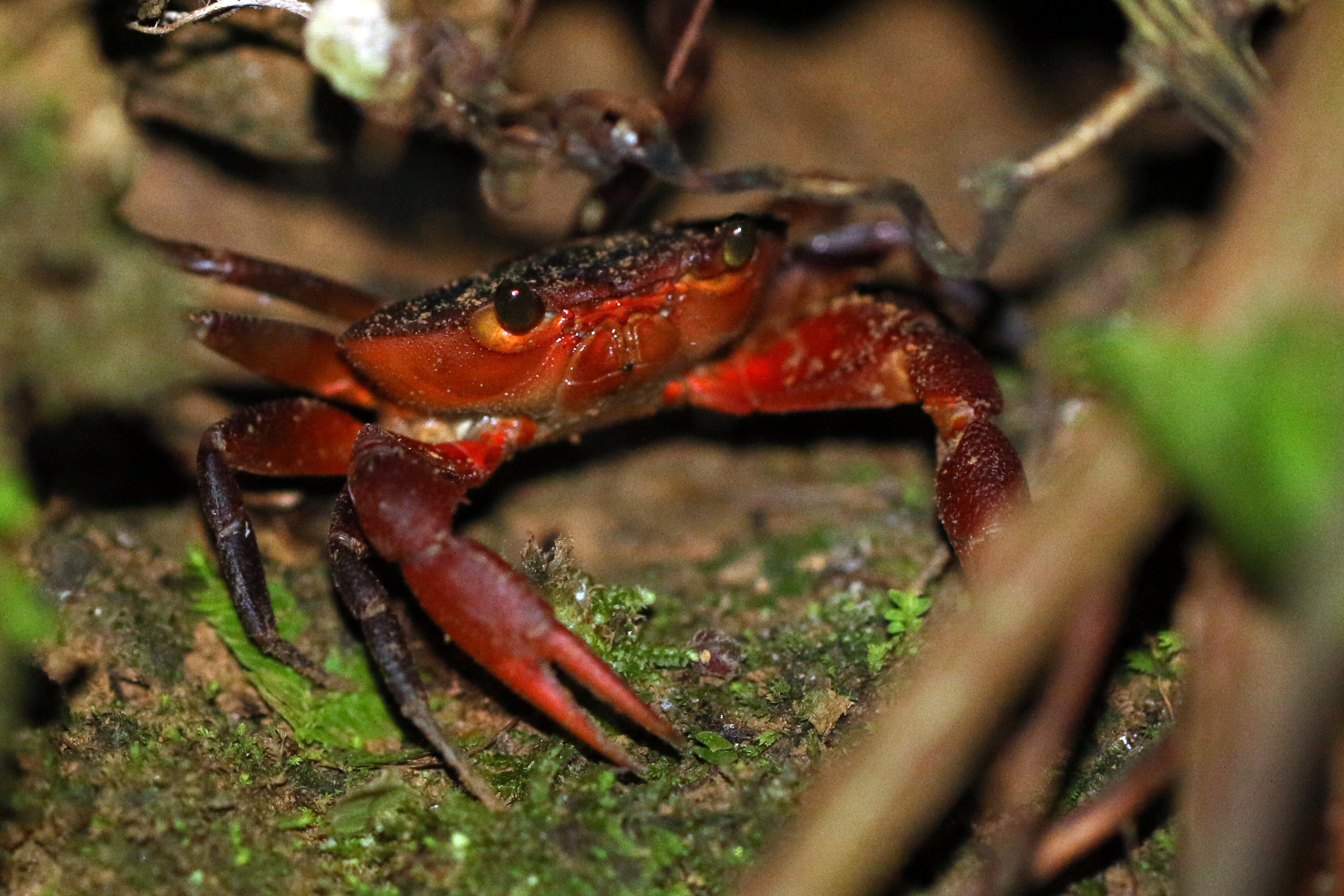
Young adult R. garmani
Trinidad
