= Chaceus =

Scientific classification
- Domain: Eukaryota
- Kingdom: Animalia
- Phylum: Arthropoda
- Class: Malacostraca
- Order: Decapoda
- Suborder: Pleocyemata
- Infraorder: Brachyura
- Family: Pseudothelphusidae
- Genus: Chaceus; Pretzmann, 1965

Genus of crabs

Chaceus is a genus of crabs in the family Pseudothelphusidae, containing the following species:

- Chaceus caecus Rodríguez & Bosque, 1990
- Chaceus cesarensis Rodríguez & Vilosia, 1992
- Chaceus curumanensis Campos & Valencia, 2004
- Chaceus davidi Campos & Rodríguez, 1984
- Chaceus guajiraensis Campos & Puerta, 2023
- Chaceus ibiricensis Campos & Valencia, 2004
- Chaceus motiloni Rodríguez, 1980
- Chaceus nasutus Rodríguez, 1980
- Chaceus pearsei (Rathbun, 1915)
- Chaceus turikensis Rodríguez & Herrera, 1994

The genus' name commemorates Fenner A. Chace Jr.
