= Gaudichaudia =

Gaudichaudia is the scientific name of two genera of organisms and may refer to:

- Gaudichaudia (crab), a genus of crabs in the family Xanthidae
- Gaudichaudia (plant), a genus of plants in the family Malpighiaceae
