= Ectaesthesius =

Scientific classification
- Kingdom: Animalia
- Phylum: Arthropoda
- Class: Malacostraca
- Order: Decapoda
- Suborder: Pleocyemata
- Infraorder: Brachyura
- Family: Xanthidae
- Genus: Ectaesthesius; Rathbun, 1898
- Species: E. bifrons

Binomial name
- Ectaesthesius bifrons Rathbun, 1898

Genus of crabs

Ectaesthesius bifrons is a species of crabs in the family Xanthidae, the only species in the genus Ectaesthesius.
