= Moritschus =

Scientific classification
- Domain: Eukaryota
- Kingdom: Animalia
- Phylum: Arthropoda
- Class: Malacostraca
- Order: Decapoda
- Suborder: Pleocyemata
- Infraorder: Brachyura
- Family: Pseudothelphusidae
- Genus: Moritschus; Pretzmann, 1965

Genus of crabs

Moritschus is a genus of crabs in the family Pseudothelphusidae, containing the following species:

- Moritschus altaquerensis Rodríguez, Campos & López, 2002
- Moritschus caucasensis Campos, Malgahães & Rodríguez, 2002
- Moritschus ecuadorensis (Rathbun, 1897)
- Moritschus henrici (Nobili, 1897)
- Moritschus narinnensis Campos & Rodríguez, 1988
- Moritschus peruvianus (Rathbun, 1898)
