= Tehuana (crab) =

Scientific classification
- Domain: Eukaryota
- Kingdom: Animalia
- Phylum: Arthropoda
- Class: Malacostraca
- Order: Decapoda
- Suborder: Pleocyemata
- Infraorder: Brachyura
- Family: Pseudothelphusidae
- Genus: Tehuana; Rodríguez & Smalley, 1969

Genus of crabs

Tehuana is a genus of crabs in the family Pseudothelphusidae, containing the following species:

- Tehuana ayotzintepecensis Moreno-Juárez, Villalobos & Álvarez, 2022
- Tehuana chontalpaensis Villalobos & Alvarez, 2003
- Tehuana col Moreno-Juárez, Villalobos & Álvarez, 2022
- Tehuana complanata (Rathbun, 1905)
- Tehuana diabolis (Pretzmann, 1978)
- Tehuana jacatepecensis Villalobos & Alvarez, 2003
- Tehuana lamellifrons (Rathbun, 1893)
- Tehuana lamothei Álvarez & Villalobos, 1994
- Tehuana poglayenora (Pretzmann, 1978)
- Tehuana veracruzana (Rodríguez & Smalley in Smalley, 1970)
