= Gilberto Rodríguez =

Gilberto Rodríguez may refer to

- Gilberto Rodríguez Orejuela (1939–2022), Colombian drug trafficker
- Gilberto Rodríguez (politician) (born 1975), Puerto Rican politician
- Gilberto Rodríguez (footballer) (born 1943), Mexican footballer
- Gilberto Rodríguez (zoologist) (1929–2004), Venezuelan carcinologist
