= Cyrtocarcinus =

Scientific classification
- Kingdom: Animalia
- Phylum: Arthropoda
- Class: Malacostraca
- Order: Decapoda
- Suborder: Pleocyemata
- Infraorder: Brachyura
- Family: Xanthidae
- Genus: Cyrtocarcinus; Ng & D. G. B. Chia, 1994
- Species: C. truncatus

Binomial name
- Cyrtocarcinus truncatus (Rathbun, 1906)

Synonyms
- Harrovia truncata Rathbun, 1906; Glyptocarcinus truncatus (Rathbun, 1906)

Genus of crabs

Cyrtocarcinus truncatus is a species of crab in the family Xanthidae that lives in the waters around Hawaii. It was described in 1906 by Mary J. Rathbun as Harrovia truncata, based on a single immature male specimen caught near Kauai. Masatsune Takeda transferred the species to his new genus Glyptocarcinus in 1979, and Peter Ng and Diana Chia erected a new genus, Cyrtocarcinus, for this species alone, in 1994.
