= Achlidon =

Conservation status
- Least Concern (IUCN 3.1)

Scientific classification
- Kingdom: Animalia
- Phylum: Arthropoda
- Class: Malacostraca
- Order: Decapoda
- Suborder: Pleocyemata
- Infraorder: Brachyura
- Family: Pseudothelphusidae
- Genus: Achlidon; Smalley, 1964
- Species: A. agrestis

Binomial name
- Achlidon agrestis (Rathbun, 1898)

Synonyms
- Pseudothelphusa (Achlidon) agrestis Rathbun, 1898; Anchlidon agrestis (Rathbun, 1898) [orth. error]

Genus of crabs

Achlidon agrestis is a species of crab in the family Pseudothelphusidae, and the only species in the genus Achlidon. It lives in rivers in Mexico and Costa Rica.
