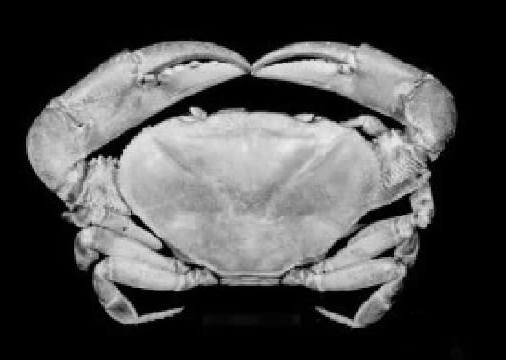
- Fredius platyacanthus

Scientific classification
- Domain: Eukaryota
- Kingdom: Animalia
- Phylum: Arthropoda
- Class: Malacostraca
- Order: Decapoda
- Suborder: Pleocyemata
- Infraorder: Brachyura
- Family: Pseudothelphusidae
- Genus: Fredius; Pretzmann, 1967

= Fredius =

Genus of crabs

Fredius is a genus of crabs in the family Pseudothelphusidae, containing the following species:

- Fredius adpressus Rodríguez & Periera, 1992
- Fredius beccarii (Coifmann, 1939)
- Fredius chaffanjoni (Rathbun, 1905)
- Fredius convexa (Rathbun, 1898)
- Fredius denticulatus (H. Milne-Edwards, 1853)
- Fredius estevisi (Rodríguez, 1966)
- Fredius fittkaui (Bott, 1967)
- Fredius granulatus Rodríguez & Campos, 1998
- Fredius platyacanthus Rodríguez & Pereira, 1992
- Fredius reflexifrons (Ortmann, 1897)
- Fredius stenolobus Rodríguez & Suárez, 1994
- Fredius ykaa Magalhães, 2009
