= Martiana =

Conservation status
- Data Deficient (IUCN 3.1)

Scientific classification
- Kingdom: Animalia
- Phylum: Arthropoda
- Class: Malacostraca
- Order: Decapoda
- Suborder: Pleocyemata
- Infraorder: Brachyura
- Family: Pseudothelphusidae
- Genus: Martiana; Rodríguez, 1980
- Species: M. clausa

Binomial name
- Martiana clausa (Rathbun, 1915)

Genus of crabs

Martiana clausa is a species of crab in the family Pseudothelphusidae, the only species in the genus Martiana.
