= Ptychophallus =

Scientific classification
- Domain: Eukaryota
- Kingdom: Animalia
- Phylum: Arthropoda
- Class: Malacostraca
- Order: Decapoda
- Suborder: Pleocyemata
- Infraorder: Brachyura
- Family: Pseudothelphusidae
- Genus: Ptychophallus; Smalley, 1964

Type species
- Pseudothelphusa tristani (Rathbun, 1896)

Genus of crabs

Ptychophallus is a genus of crabs in the family Pseudothelphusidae.

== Species ==
Ptychophallus contains the following species:

- Ptychophallus bilobatus Magalhães & Ng, 2019
- Ptychophallus campylos Pretzmann, 1968
- Ptychophallus cocleensis Pretzmann, 1965
- Ptychophallus colombianus (Rathbun, 1893)
- Ptychophallus costaricensis Villalobos, 1974
- Ptychophallus exilipes (Rathbun, 1898)
- Ptychophallus goldmanni Pretzmann, 1965
- Ptychophallus kuna Campos & Lemaitre, 1999
- Ptychophallus lavallensis Pretzmann, 1978
- Ptychophallus micracanthus Rodríguez, 1994
- Ptychophallus montanus (Rathbun, 1898)
- Ptychophallus paraxantusi (Bott, 1968)
- Ptychophallus tristani (Rathbun, 1896)
- Ptychophallus tumimanus (Rathbun, 1898)
- Ptychophallus uncinatus Campos & Lemaitre, 1999
