= Kingsleya =

Scientific classification
- Domain: Eukaryota
- Kingdom: Animalia
- Phylum: Arthropoda
- Class: Malacostraca
- Order: Decapoda
- Suborder: Pleocyemata
- Infraorder: Brachyura
- Family: Pseudothelphusidae
- Genus: Kingsleya; Ortmann, 1897

Genus of crabs

Kingsleya is a genus of crabs in the family Pseudothelphusidae, containing the following species:

- Kingsleya attenboroughi Pinheiro & Santana, 2016
- Kingsleya besti Magãlhaes, 1990
- Kingsleya gustavoi Magãlhaes, 2004
- Kingsleya junki Magãlhaes, 2003
- Kingsleya latifrons (Rathbun, 1840)
- Kingsleya siolii (Bott, 1967)
- Kingsleya ytupora Magãlhaes, 1986
