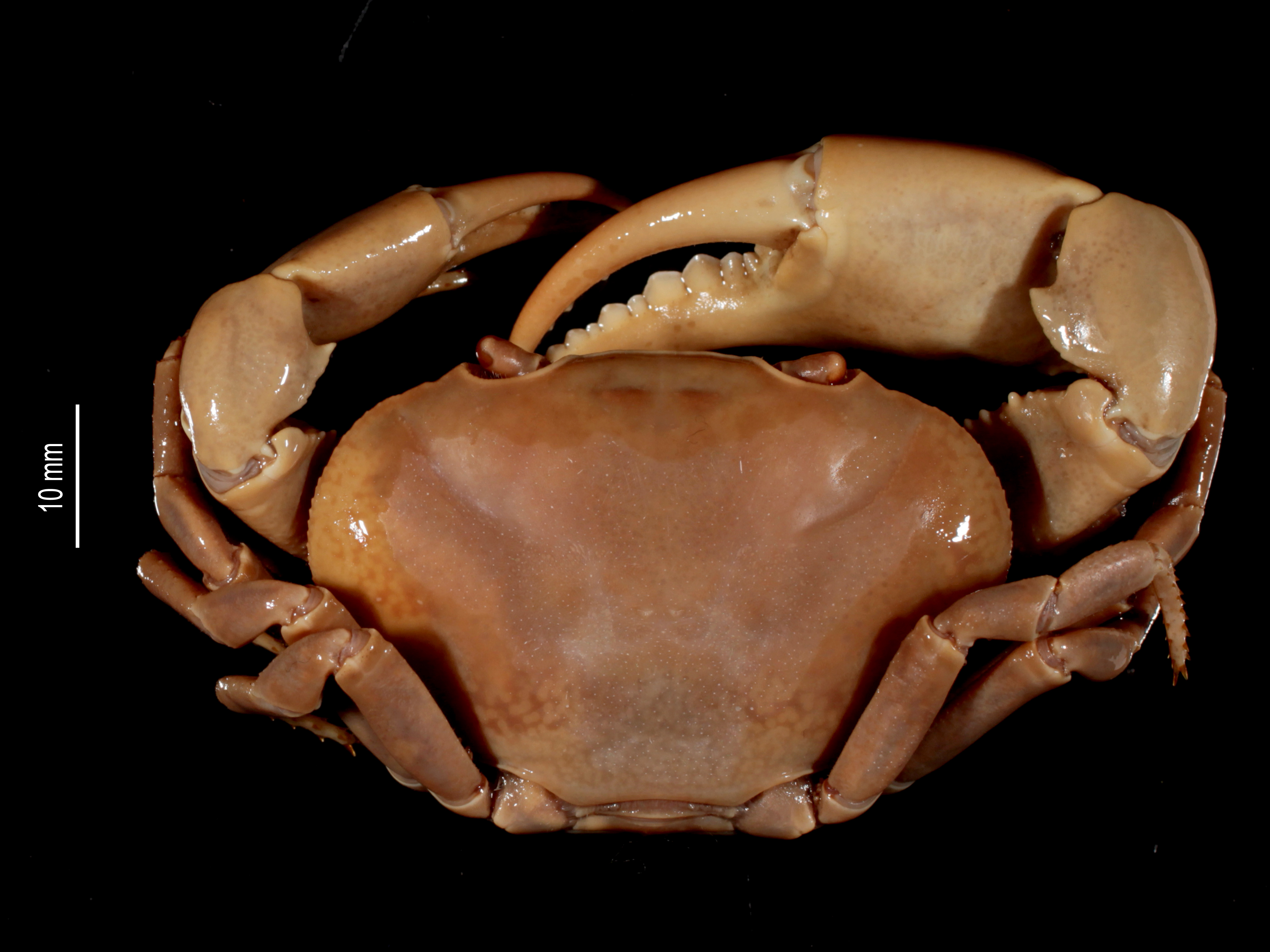
- Pseudothelphusa dilatata

Scientific classification
- Domain: Eukaryota
- Kingdom: Animalia
- Phylum: Arthropoda
- Class: Malacostraca
- Order: Decapoda
- Suborder: Pleocyemata
- Infraorder: Brachyura
- Family: Pseudothelphusidae
- Genus: Pseudothelphusa; Saussure, 1857

= Pseudothelphusa =

Genus of crabs

Pseudothelphusa is a genus of crabs in the family Pseudothelphusidae, containing the following species:

- Pseudothelphusa acahuizotla Ojeda-Escoto, Villalobos & Alvarez, 2017
- Pseudothelphusa americana de Saussure, 1857
- Pseudothelphusa belliana Rathbun, 1898
- Pseudothelphusa dilatata Rathbun, 1898
- Pseudothelphusa doenitzi Bott, 1968
- Pseudothelphusa dugesi Rathbun, 1893
- Pseudothelphusa galloi Álvarez & Villalobos, 1990
- Pseudothelphusa granatensis Rodríguez & Smalley, 1972
- Pseudothelphusa guerreroensis Rathbun, 1933
- Pseudothelphusa hoffmannae Álvarez & Villalobos, 1996
- Pseudothelphusa ixtapan Ojeda-Escoto, Villalobos & Alvarez, 2017
- Pseudothelphusa jouyi Rathbun, 1893
- Pseudothelphusa leiophrys Rodríguez & Smalley, 1972
- Pseudothelphusa lophophallus Rodríguez & Smalley, 1972
- Pseudothelphusa mexicana Álvarez-Noguera, 1987
- Pseudothelphusa morelosis Pretzmann, 1968
- Pseudothelphusa nayaritae Álvarez & Villalobos, 1994
- Pseudothelphusa nelsoni Rathbun, 1905
- Pseudothelphusa parabelliana Álvarez, 1989
- Pseudothelphusa peyotensis Rodríguez & Smalley, 1972
- Pseudothelphusa purhepecha Ojeda-Escoto, Villalobos & Alvarez, 2017
- Pseudothelphusa rechingeri Pretzmann, 1965
- Pseudothelphusa seiferti Hobbs, 1980
- Pseudothelphusa sonorensis Miles, 1967
- Pseudothelphusa sulcifrons Rathbun, 1898
- Pseudothelphusa terrestris Rathbun, 1893
