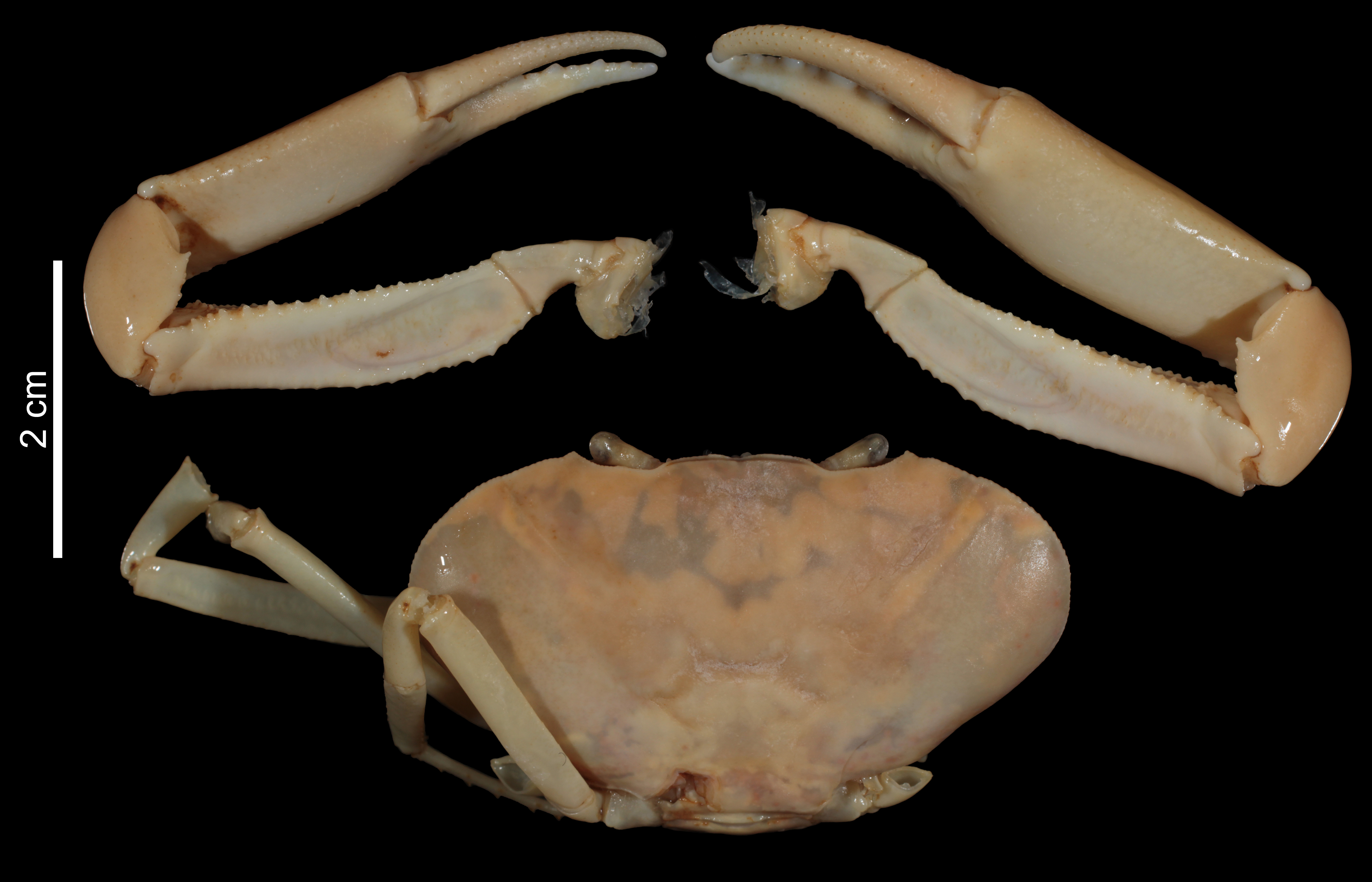
- Potamocarcinus falcatus

Scientific classification
- Domain: Eukaryota
- Kingdom: Animalia
- Phylum: Arthropoda
- Class: Malacostraca
- Order: Decapoda
- Suborder: Pleocyemata
- Infraorder: Brachyura
- Family: Pseudothelphusidae
- Genus: Potamocarcinus; H. Milne-Edwards, 1853

Type species
- Potamocarcinus armatus H. Milne-Edwards, 1853

= Potamocarcinus =

Genus of crabs

Potamocarcinus is a genus of crabs in the family Pseudothelphusidae.

- Potamocarcinus armatus H. Milne-Edwards, 1853
- Potamocarcinus chajulensis Alvarez & Villalobos, 1998
- Potamocarcinus colombiensis von Prahl & Ramos, 1987
- Potamocarcinus hartmanni Pretzmann, 1975
- Potamocarcinus lobulatus Campos & Lemaitre, 2002
- Potamocarcinus magnus (Rathbun, 1895)
- Potamocarcinus moritschi Pretzmann, 1965
- Potamocarcinus nicaraguensis Rathbun, 1893
- Potamocarcinus pinzoni Campos, 2003
- Potamocarcinus richmondi (Rathbun, 1893)
- Potamocarcinus roatensis Rodríguez & López, 2003
- Potamocarcinus tapirrhynchus Magalhães & Ng, 2019
