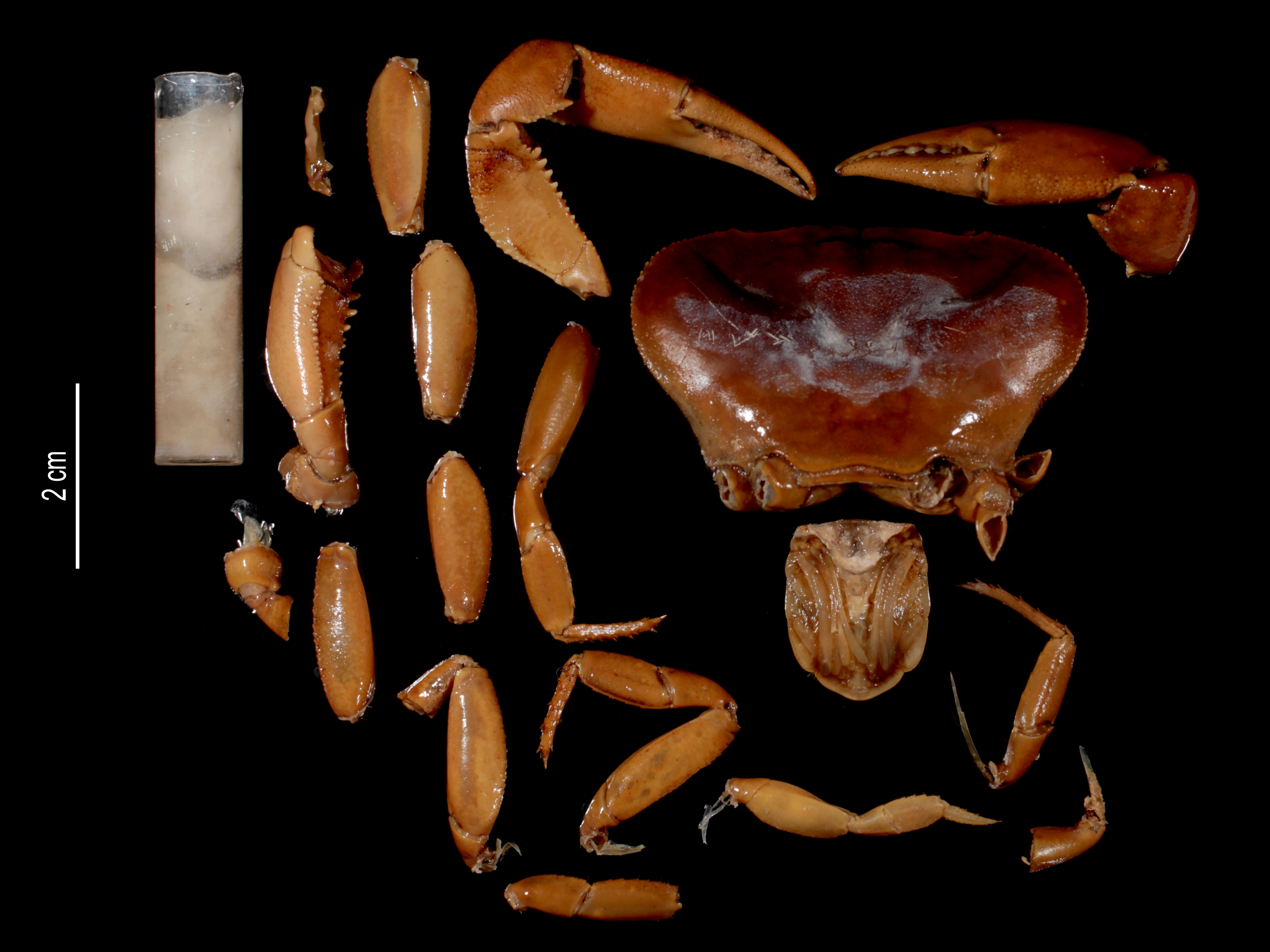
- Raddaus tuberculatus

Scientific classification
- Domain: Eukaryota
- Kingdom: Animalia
- Phylum: Arthropoda
- Class: Malacostraca
- Order: Decapoda
- Suborder: Pleocyemata
- Infraorder: Brachyura
- Family: Pseudothelphusidae
- Genus: Raddaus; Pretzmann, 1965

= Raddaus =

Genus of crabs

Raddaus is a genus of crabs in the family Pseudothelphusidae, containing the following species:

- Raddaus bocourti (A. Milne-Edwards, 1866)
- Raddaus mertensi (Bott, 1956)
- Raddaus orestrius (Smalley, 1965)
- Raddaus tuberculatus (Rathbun, 1897)
