= Phrygiopilus =

Scientific classification
- Domain: Eukaryota
- Kingdom: Animalia
- Phylum: Arthropoda
- Class: Malacostraca
- Order: Decapoda
- Suborder: Pleocyemata
- Infraorder: Brachyura
- Family: Pseudothelphusidae
- Genus: Phrygiopilus; Smalley, 1970

Genus of crabs

Phrygiopilus is a genus of crabs in the family Pseudothelphusidae, containing the following species:

- Phrygiopilus acanthophallus Smalley, 1970
- Phrygiopilus chuacusensis Smalley, 1970
- Phrygiopilus ibarrai (Pretzmann, 1978)
- Phrygiopilus longipes (Pretzmann, 1965)
- Phrygiopilus montebelloensis Alvarez & Villalobos, 1998
- Phrygiopilus strengerae (Pretzmann, 1965)
- Phrygiopilus yoshibensis Alvarez & Villalobos, 1998
