= Lobithelphusa =

Conservation status
- Data Deficient (IUCN 3.1)

Scientific classification
- Kingdom: Animalia
- Phylum: Arthropoda
- Class: Malacostraca
- Order: Decapoda
- Suborder: Pleocyemata
- Infraorder: Brachyura
- Family: Pseudothelphusidae
- Genus: Lobithelphusa; Rodríguez, 1982
- Species: L. mexicana

Binomial name
- Lobithelphusa mexicana Rodríguez, 1982

Genus of crabs

Lobithelphusa mexicana is a species of crab in the family Pseudothelphusidae, the only species in the genus Lobithelphusa.
