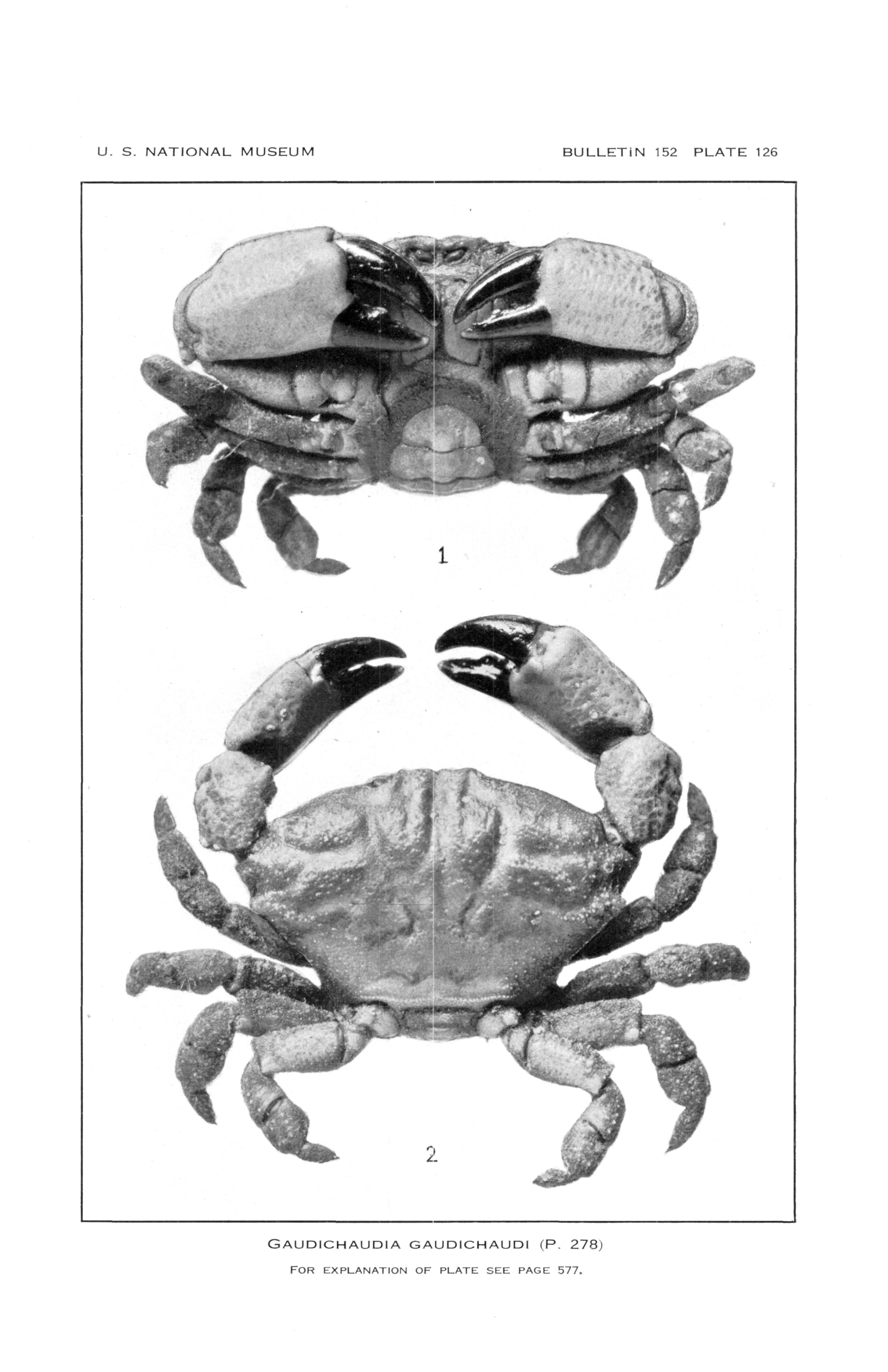
- Gaudichaudia gaudichaudii

Scientific classification
- Domain: Eukaryota
- Kingdom: Animalia
- Phylum: Arthropoda
- Class: Malacostraca
- Order: Decapoda
- Suborder: Pleocyemata
- Infraorder: Brachyura
- Family: Xanthidae
- Genus: Gaudichaudia; Rathbun, 1930

= Gaudichaudia (crab) =

Genus of crabs

Gaudichaudia is a genus of crabs in the family Xanthidae, containing the following species:

- Gaudichaudia gaudichaudii (H. Milne-Edwards, 1834)
- Gaudichaudia tridentatus (Lenz, 1902)
