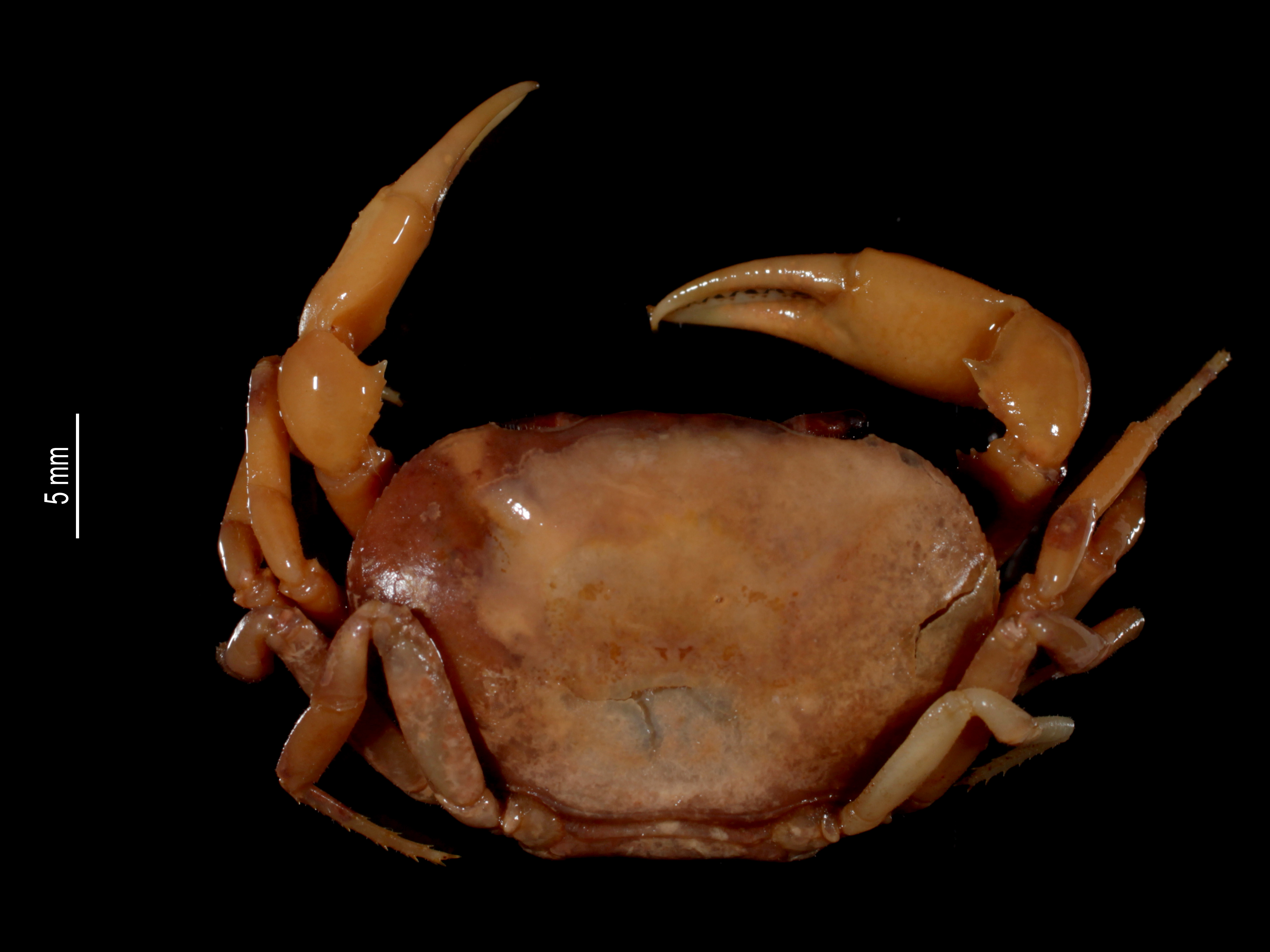
- Orthothelphusa venezuelensis

Scientific classification
- Domain: Eukaryota
- Kingdom: Animalia
- Phylum: Arthropoda
- Class: Malacostraca
- Order: Decapoda
- Suborder: Pleocyemata
- Infraorder: Brachyura
- Family: Pseudothelphusidae
- Subfamily: Kingsleyinae
- Genus: Orthothelphusa; Rodríguez, 1980

= Orthothelphusa =

Genus of crabs

Orthothelphusa is a genus of crabs in the family Pseudothelphusidae, containing the following species:

- Orthothelphusa holthuisi (Rodríguez, 1967)
- Orthothelphusa roberti (Bott, 1967)
- Orthothelphusa venezuelensis (Rathbun, 1905)
