= Odontothelphusa =

Scientific classification
- Kingdom: Animalia
- Phylum: Arthropoda
- Class: Malacostraca
- Order: Decapoda
- Suborder: Pleocyemata
- Infraorder: Brachyura
- Family: Pseudothelphusidae
- Genus: Odontothelphusa; Rodríguez, 1982

Genus of crabs

Odontothelphusa is a genus of crabs in the family Pseudothelphusidae, containing the following species:

- Odontothelphusa apicpac Villalobos, García & Velázquez, 2010
- Odontothelphusa lacandona Alvarez & Villalobos, 1998
- Odontothelphusa lacanjaensis Alvarez & Villalobos, 1998
- Odontothelphusa maxillipes (Rathbun, 1898)
- Odontothelphusa monodontis Rodríguez & Hobbs, 1989
- Odontothelphusa palenquensis Alvarez & Villalobos, 1998
- Odontothelphusa toninae Alvarez & Villalobos, 1991
