= Camptophallus =

Conservation status
- Data Deficient (IUCN 3.1)

Scientific classification
- Kingdom: Animalia
- Phylum: Arthropoda
- Class: Malacostraca
- Order: Decapoda
- Suborder: Pleocyemata
- Infraorder: Brachyura
- Family: Pseudothelphusidae
- Genus: Camptophallus; Smalley, 1965
- Species: C. botti

Binomial name
- Camptophallus botti (Smalley, 1965)

Genus of crabs

Camptophallus botti is a species of crab in the family Pseudothelphusidae, and the only species in the genus Camptophallus. It is endemic to the Nicaraguan departments of Matagalpa and Jinotega.
