= Neopseudothelphusa =

Scientific classification
- Kingdom: Animalia
- Phylum: Arthropoda
- Class: Malacostraca
- Order: Decapoda
- Suborder: Pleocyemata
- Infraorder: Brachyura
- Family: Pseudothelphusidae
- Genus: Neopseudothelphusa; Pretzmann, 1965
- Species: N. fossor

Binomial name
- Neopseudothelphusa fossor (Rathbun, 1898)

Genus of crabs

Neopseudothelphusa is a genus of crabs in the family Pseudothelphusidae, containing only the species Neopseudothelphusa fossor.
