= Eudaniela =

Scientific classification
- Kingdom: Animalia
- Phylum: Arthropoda
- Class: Malacostraca
- Order: Decapoda
- Suborder: Pleocyemata
- Infraorder: Brachyura
- Family: Pseudothelphusidae
- Subfamily: Kingsleyinae
- Genus: Eudaniela; Pretzmann, 1971

Genus of crabs

Eudaniela is a genus of crabs in the family Pseudothelphusidae.

== Location ==
Eudaniela are found along the Andean and Coastal cordillera of Venezuela and in the highlands of Isla Margarita, Trinidad and Tobago. Species of Eudaniela live in freshwater streams and rivers at a high altitude above sea level.

On Tobago, the E. garmani construct burrows or hide in naturally occurring crevices near fast-flowing streams. Owing to the nature of the terrain surrounding these streams, E. garmani are less likely to be observed creating their own burrows.

== Biology ==
Eudaniela have been recorded to reach sexual maturity at a large size and also at a relatively old age. Females reach sexual maturity at about three years of age. There is not enough data or information known to determine if any species of Eudaniela are threatened to become endangered species.

Eudaniela shell colour has been observed to change with increasing size, with smaller Eudaniela (<25 mm carapace width, CW) being dark brown and larger Eudaniela (>50mm CW) being chestnut brown.

== Diet ==
Eudaniela have a distinctive stance when catching prey, adopting a sit and wait strategy. Using the tips of two of their legs supporting them in the water, they used the other two legs to gently sweep back and forth. When prey is detected, a pouncing action was observed.

Eudaniela have been reported as being one of the very few examples of invertebrates preying on vertebrates. Several sightings (albeit not active predation) of Eudaniela feeding on snakes have been recorded. Additionally, it was observed that Eudaniela prefer to dexterously skin the snakes using their pincers prior to consumption.

It has been postulated that within the Tobago ecosystem, Eudaniela is the apex predator, with no evident predation by other organisms noted.

== Species ==
Eudaniela contains the following species:

- Eudaniela casanarensis (Campos, 2001)
- Eudaniela pestai (Pretzmann, 1965)
