= Spirothelphusa =

Scientific classification
- Kingdom: Animalia
- Phylum: Arthropoda
- Class: Malacostraca
- Order: Decapoda
- Suborder: Pleocyemata
- Infraorder: Brachyura
- Family: Pseudothelphusidae
- Genus: Spirothelphusa; Pretzmann, 1965
- Species: S. verticalis

Binomial name
- Spirothelphusa verticalis (Rathbun, 1893)

Genus of crabs

Spirothelphusa is a genus of crabs in the family Pseudothelphusidae, containing only the species Spirothelphusa verticalis.
