= Phallangothelphusa =

Scientific classification
- Domain: Eukaryota
- Kingdom: Animalia
- Phylum: Arthropoda
- Class: Malacostraca
- Order: Decapoda
- Suborder: Pleocyemata
- Infraorder: Brachyura
- Family: Pseudothelphusidae
- Genus: Phallangothelphusa; Pretzmann, 1965

Genus of crabs

Phallangothelphusa is a genus of crabs in the family Pseudothelphusidae.

== Species ==
Phallangothelphusa contains the following species:

- Phallangothelphusa dispar (Zimmer, 1912)
- Phallangothelphusa magdalenensis Campos, 1998
- Phallangothelphusa martensis Cardona & Campos, 2012
- Phallangothelphusa juansei Campos, 2010
- Phallangothelphusa tangerina Campos, Lasso & Arias, 2019
- Phallangothelphusa zenuorum Campos & Alexander, 2020
