= Elsalvadoria =

Scientific classification
- Domain: Eukaryota
- Kingdom: Animalia
- Phylum: Arthropoda
- Class: Malacostraca
- Order: Decapoda
- Suborder: Pleocyemata
- Infraorder: Brachyura
- Family: Pseudothelphusidae
- Genus: Elsalvadoria; Bott, 1967

Genus of crabs

Elsalvadoria is a genus of crabs in the family Pseudothelphusidae, containing the following species:

- Elsalvadoria tomhaasi Bott, 1970
- Elsalvadoria zurstrasseni (Bott, 1956)
