= Disparithelphusa =

Conservation status
- Data Deficient (IUCN 3.1)

Scientific classification
- Kingdom: Animalia
- Phylum: Arthropoda
- Class: Malacostraca
- Order: Decapoda
- Suborder: Pleocyemata
- Infraorder: Brachyura
- Family: Pseudothelphusidae
- Genus: Disparithelphusa; Smalley & Adkinson, 1984
- Species: D. pecki

Binomial name
- Disparithelphusa pecki Smalley & Adkinson, 1984

Genus of crabs

Disparithelphusa pecki is a species of freshwater crab in the family Pseudothelphusidae, and the only species in the genus Disparithelphusa.

The first specimens of D. pecki were collected by Stewart Peck in 1971 at an altitude of 600 metres (2,000 ft) in the Valle Nacional, Oaxaca, Mexico (17°42′N 96°19′W). They were deposited at the Museum of Natural History, Tulane University, and described as a new species by Alfred Smalley and Daniel Adkinson in 1984.

The species is listed as Data Deficient on the IUCN Red List.
