= Smalleyus =

Conservation status
- Data Deficient (IUCN 3.1)

Scientific classification
- Kingdom: Animalia
- Phylum: Arthropoda
- Class: Malacostraca
- Order: Decapoda
- Suborder: Pleocyemata
- Infraorder: Brachyura
- Family: Pseudothelphusidae
- Genus: Smalleyus; Alvarez, 1989
- Species: S. tricristatus

Binomial name
- Smalleyus tricristatus Alvarez, 1989

Genus of crabs

Smalleyus is a genus of crabs in the family Pseudothelphusidae, containing the single species Smalleyus tricristatus.

Smalleyus tricristatus was described by Fernando Alvarez in 1989, based on specimens collected in the Los Tuxtlas region of Veracruz, adjacent to the Gulf of Mexico (18°26′N 94°57′W).

Smalleyus tricristatus is listed as Data Deficient on the IUCN Red List.
