= Lindacatalina =

Scientific classification
- Domain: Eukaryota
- Kingdom: Animalia
- Phylum: Arthropoda
- Class: Malacostraca
- Order: Decapoda
- Suborder: Pleocyemata
- Infraorder: Brachyura
- Family: Pseudothelphusidae
- Genus: Lindacatalina; Pretzmann, 1977

Genus of crabs

Lindacatalina is a genus of crabs in the family Pseudothelphusidae, containing the following species:

- Lindacatalina brevipenis (Rodríguez & Diaz, 1980)
- Lindacatalina gracilignatha (Pretzmann, 1972)
- Lindacatalina hauserae (Pretzmann, 1977)
- Lindacatalina latipenis (Pretzmann, 1968)
- Lindacatalina orientalis (Pretzmann, 1968)
- Lindacatalina puyensis (Pretzmann, 1978)
- Lindacatalina sinuensis Rodríguez, Campos & López, 2002
- Lindacatalina sumacensis Rodríguez & von Sternberg, 1998
