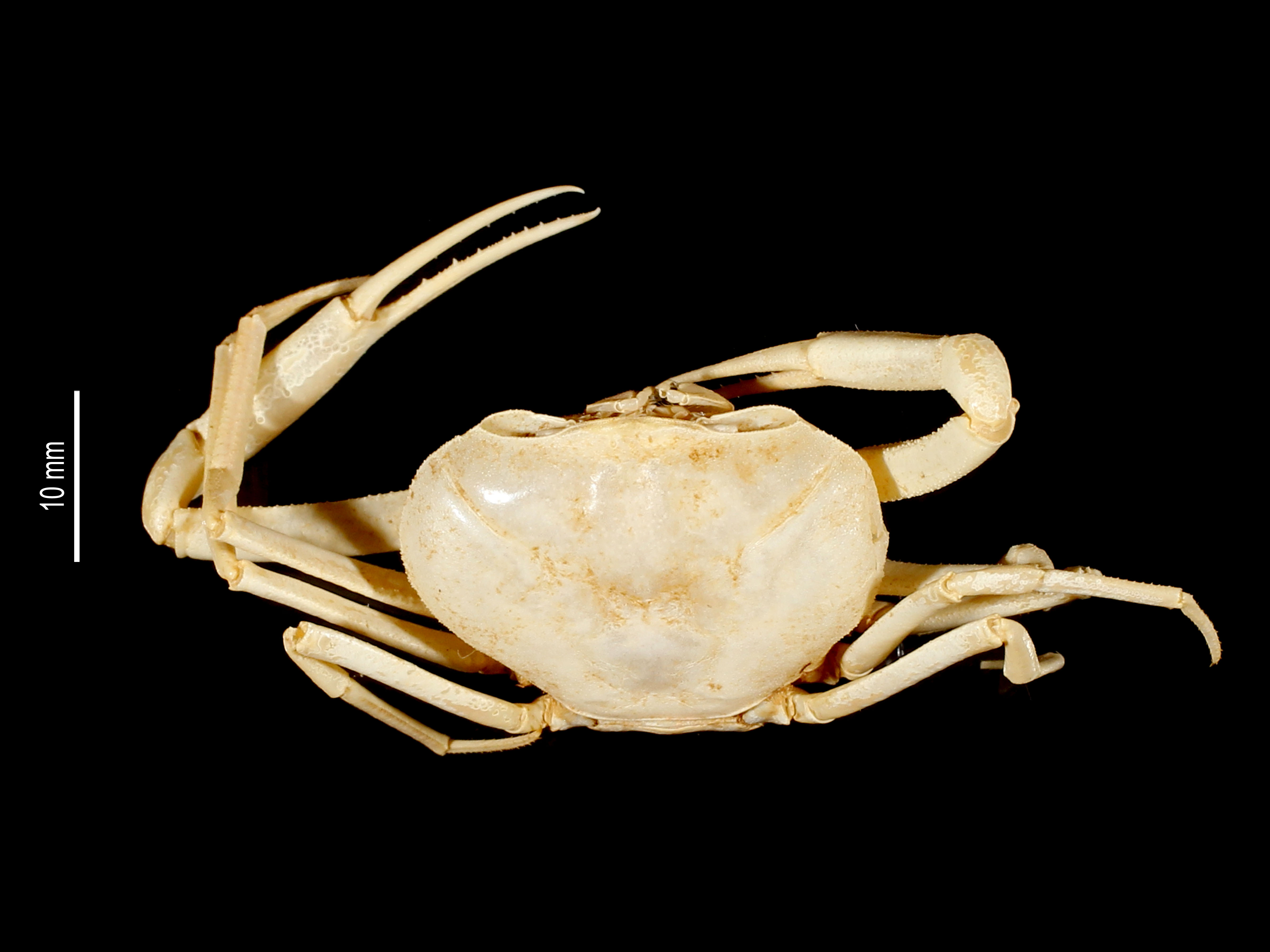
- Typhlopseudothelphusa juberthiei
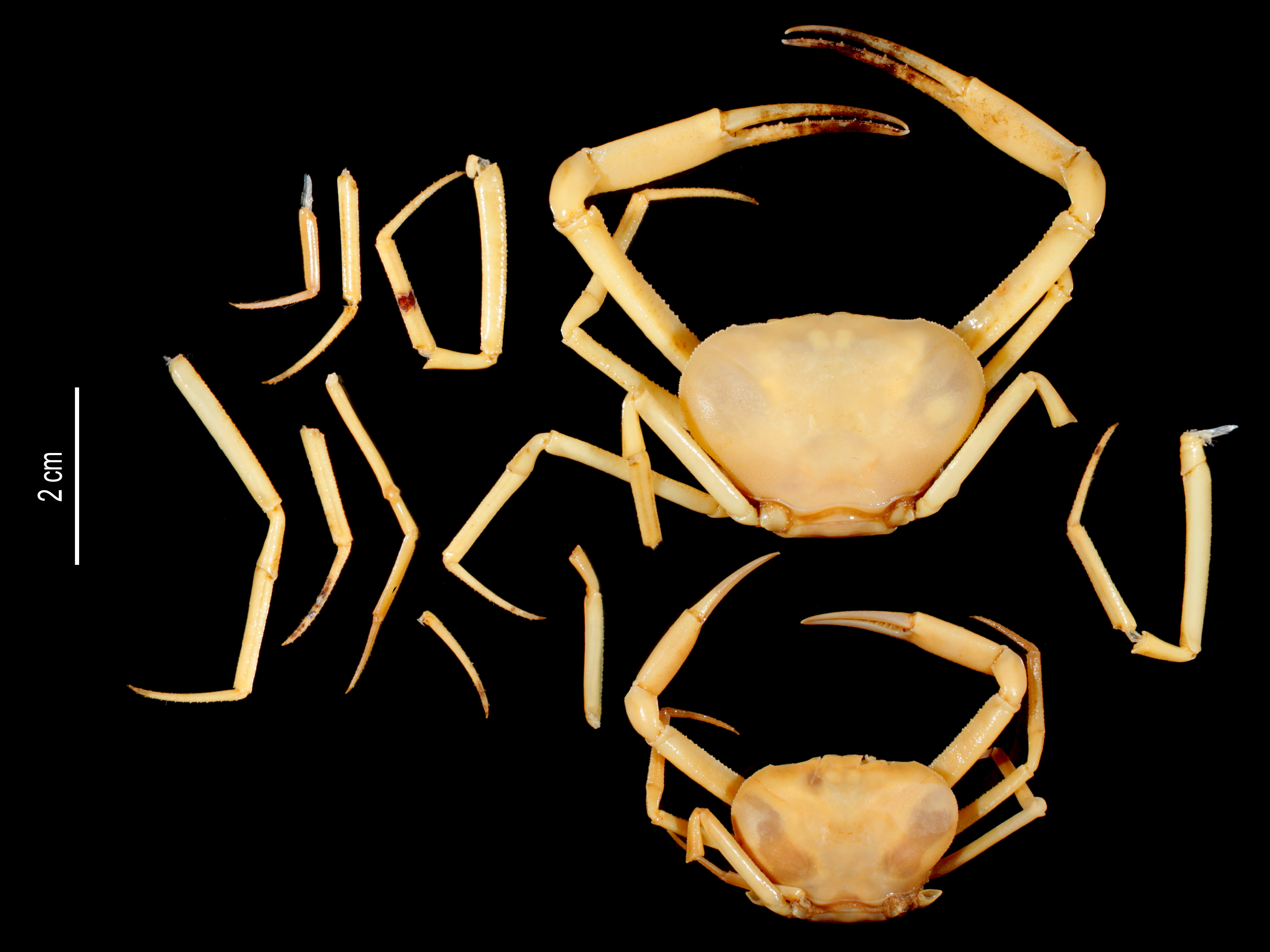
- Typhlopseudothelphusa mitchelli

Scientific classification
- Kingdom: Animalia
- Phylum: Arthropoda
- Clade: Pancrustacea
- Class: Malacostraca
- Order: Decapoda
- Suborder: Pleocyemata
- Infraorder: Brachyura
- Family: Pseudothelphusidae
- Genus: Typhlopseudothelphusa; Rioja, 1952

= Typhlopseudothelphusa =

Genus of crabs

Typhlopseudothelphusa is a genus of cave-adapted crabs in the family Pseudothelphusidae, containing the following species:

- Typhlopseudothelphusa acanthochela Hobbs, 1986
- Typhlopseudothelphusa hyba Rodríguez & Hobbs, 1989
- Typhlopseudothelphusa juberthiei Delamare Debouteville, 1976
- Typhlopseudothelphusa mitchelli Delamare Debouteville, 1976
- Typhlopseudothelphusa mocinoi Rioja, 1952
