= Marratha =

Scientific classification
- Domain: Eukaryota
- Kingdom: Animalia
- Phylum: Arthropoda
- Class: Malacostraca
- Order: Decapoda
- Suborder: Pleocyemata
- Infraorder: Brachyura
- Family: Xanthidae
- Genus: Marratha; Ng & Clark, 2003
- Species: M. angusta

Binomial name
- Marratha angusta (Rathbun, 1906)

Synonyms
- Cycloxanthops angustus Rathbun, 1906

Genus of crabs

Marratha angusta is a species of crabs in the family Xanthidae, the only species in the genus Marratha. It was originally described as Cycloxanthops angustus by Mary J. Rathbun in 1906, but was moved to a new genus in 2003; the name of the genus, Marratha, is an "arbitrary abbreviation" of Rathbun's name. It has been recorded from the Amirante Islands (Seychelles), Hawaii and the South China Sea.
