= Strengeriana =

Scientific classification
- Domain: Eukaryota
- Kingdom: Animalia
- Phylum: Arthropoda
- Class: Malacostraca
- Order: Decapoda
- Suborder: Pleocyemata
- Infraorder: Brachyura
- Family: Pseudothelphusidae
- Genus: Strengeriana; Pretzmann, 1971

Genus of crabs

Strengeriana is a genus of crabs in the family Pseudothelphusidae, containing the following species:

- Strengeriana antioquensis von Prahl, 1987
- Strengeriana bolivarensis Rodríguez & Campos, 1989
- Strengeriana cajaensis Campos & Rodríguez, 1993
- Strengeriana casallasi Campos, 1999
- Strengeriana chaparralensis Campos & Rodríguez, 1984
- Strengeriana flagellata Campos & Rodríguez, 1993
- Strengeriana florenciae Campos, 1995
- Strengeriana foresti Rodríguez, 1980
- Strengeriana fuhrmanni (Zimmer, 1912)
- Strengeriana huilensis Rodríguez & Campos, 1989
- Strengeriana maniformis Campos & Rodríguez, 1993
- Strengeriana quindiensis Campos & Camacho, 2019
- Strengeriana restrepoi Rodríguez, 1980
- Strengeriana risaraldensis Rodríguez & Campos, 1989
- Strengeriana taironae Rodríguez & Campos, 1989
- Strengeriana tolimensis Rodríguez & Diaz, 1980
- Strengeriana villaensis Campos & Pedraza, 2006
