= Allacanthos =

Scientific classification
- Domain: Eukaryota
- Kingdom: Animalia
- Phylum: Arthropoda
- Class: Malacostraca
- Order: Decapoda
- Suborder: Pleocyemata
- Infraorder: Brachyura
- Family: Pseudothelphusidae
- Subfamily: Pseudothelphusinae
- Genus: Allacanthos; Smalley, 1964

Genus of crabs

Allacanthos is a genus of crabs in the family Pseudothelphusidae

== Species ==
- Allacanthos pittieri (Rathbun, 1898)
- Allacanthos yawi Magalhaes, Lara & Wehrtmann, 2010
