= Eidocamptophallus =

Conservation status
- Data Deficient (IUCN 3.1)

Scientific classification
- Kingdom: Animalia
- Phylum: Arthropoda
- Clade: Pancrustacea
- Class: Malacostraca
- Order: Decapoda
- Suborder: Pleocyemata
- Infraorder: Brachyura
- Family: Pseudothelphusidae
- Genus: Eidocamptophallus; Rodríguez & Hobbs, 1989
- Species: E. chacei

Binomial name
- Eidocamptophallus chacei (Pretzmann, 1967)

Genus of crabs

Eidocamptophallus chacei is a species of crab in the family Pseudothelphusidae, and the only species in the genus Eidocamptophallus.
