= Villalobosius =

Scientific classification
- Kingdom: Animalia
- Phylum: Arthropoda
- Class: Malacostraca
- Order: Decapoda
- Suborder: Pleocyemata
- Infraorder: Brachyura
- Family: Pseudothelphusidae
- Genus: Villalobosius; Ng & Low, 2010
- Species: V. lopezformenti

Binomial name
- Villalobosius lopezformenti (Alvarez & Villalobos, 1991)

Synonyms
- [of genus Villalobosius]: Stygothelphusa Alvarez & Villalobos, 1991; Villalobosus Ng & Alvarez, 2000; [of species V. lopezformenti]: Stygothelphusa lopezformenti Alvarez & Villalobos, 1991; Villalobosus lopezformenti (Alvarez & Villalobos, 1991)

Genus of crabs

Villalobosius is a genus of crabs in the family Pseudothelphusidae, containing a single species, Villalobosius lopezformenti. It lives in the northern part of the state of Oaxaca, Mexico, on the Isthmus of Tehuantepec, and is adapted to a troglobitic lifestyle.

== Nomenclature ==
The species was originally described as Stygothelphusa lopezformenti in 1991, but the genus name Stygothelphusa was discovered to be a junior homonym of Stygothelphusa Ng, 1989, and a replacement name, Villalobosus, was created in 2000. This was also found to be a junior homonym, of the subgenus Villalobosus Holthuis, 1972 in the crayfish genus Procambarus, and so it, too, was replaced. The genus is therefore currently known as Villalobosius.
