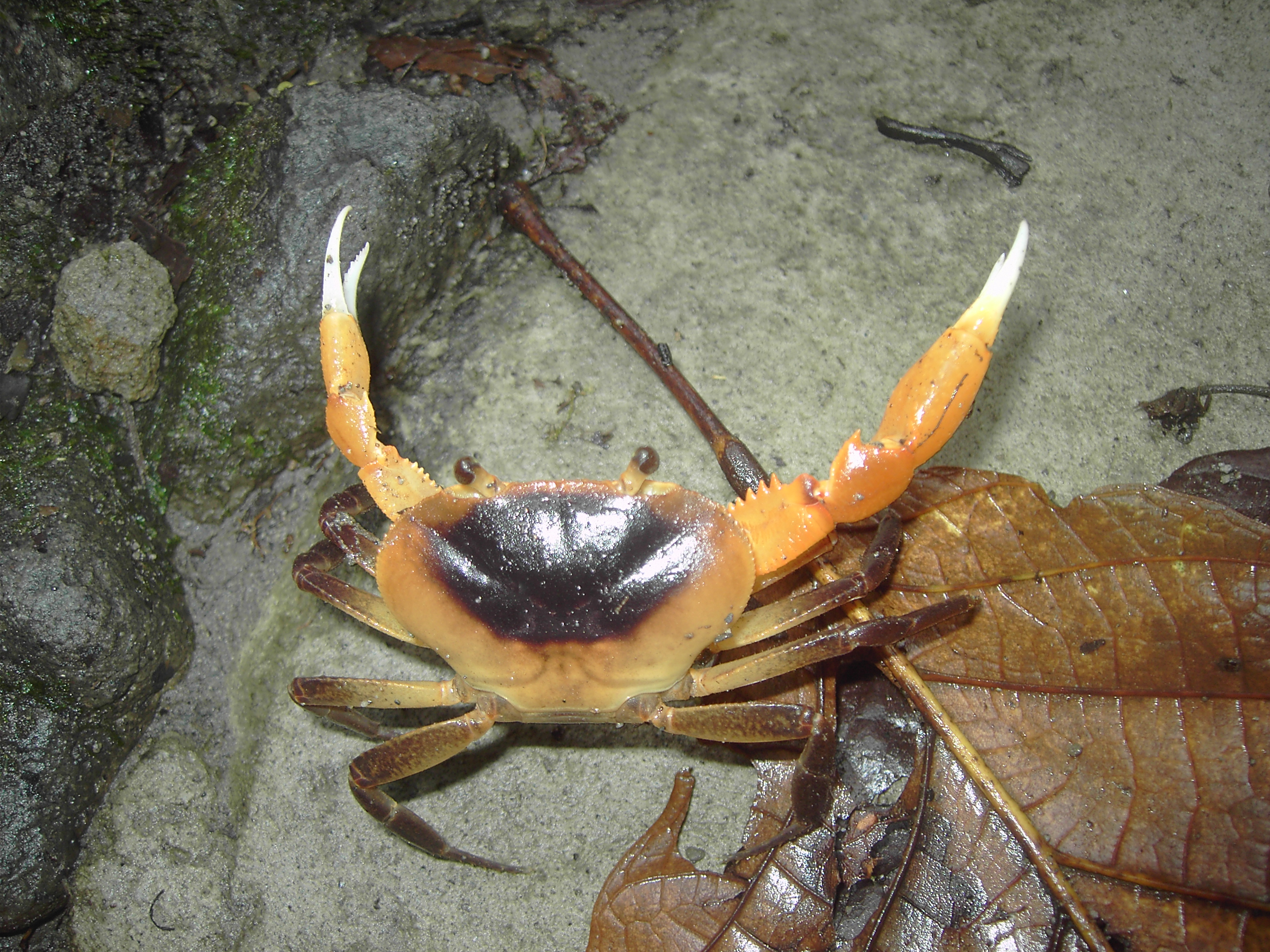

Conservation status
- Least Concern (IUCN 3.1)

Scientific classification
- Kingdom: Animalia
- Phylum: Arthropoda
- Class: Malacostraca
- Order: Decapoda
- Suborder: Pleocyemata
- Infraorder: Brachyura
- Family: Pseudothelphusidae
- Subfamily: Guinotinae
- Genus: Guinotia; Pretzmann, 1965
- Species: G. dentata

Binomial name
- Guinotia dentata (Latreille, 1825)

Synonyms
- Boscia Henri Milne EdwardsH. Milne Edwards, 1837; Guinotia (Guinotia) Pretzmann, 1965; Potamia Latreille, 1831; Pseudothelphusa (Guinotia) Pretzmann, 1965; Pseudothelphusa tenuipes Pocock, 1889; Thelphusa dentata Latreille, 1825

= Guinotia =

Genus of crab

Guinotia is a monotypic genus of freshwater crabs in the family Pseudothelphusidae, containing only the species Guinotia dentata, commonly known as cyrique. They have few predators. Found in the West Indies, they are easily caught and thus are used locally as a food source.

== Description ==
Guinotia dentata is almost oval in shape and the teeth on its carapace are very small. It is a yellow-brown colour and its shell can grow to 65 millimetres (2.6 in) long; it is about 3/5 long as wide. The eyestalks are yellow whilst the corneas are black, but they are probably best identifiable by their large yellow claws with straight sharply pointed fingers.

The species sometimes has almost an entire dorsal surface of carapace yellow with submarginal brown.

Its shell has a cervical meandering curve which does not quite touch the edge of the shell. About 24 cubicles are well defined. The forehead is low, excavated and depressed and of uniform height. Its pereiopods are fairly average and its chelae are without prominent, swollen protuberance on outer surface near the base of the fingers.

== Distribution and habitat ==
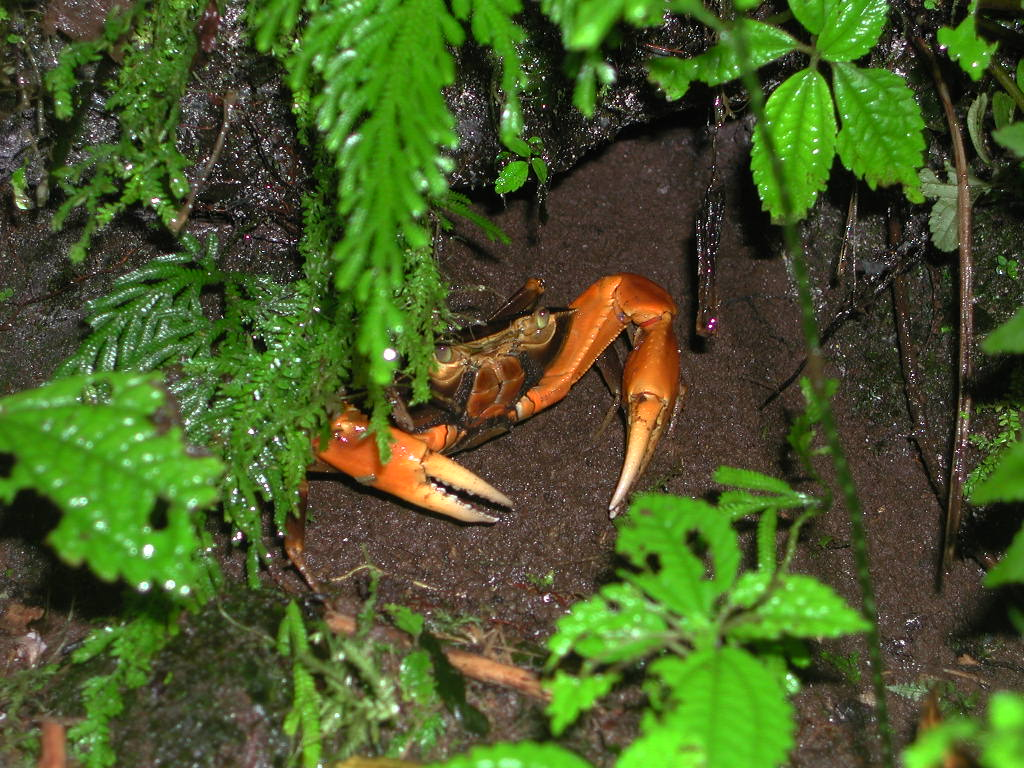
Guinotia dentata in Dominica

The species is native mostly to Dominica, Guadeloupe, Martinique and Saint Lucia. Its distribution is fragmented because of its presence on multiple islands, but it is plentiful in the regions it inhabits.

Guinotia dentata lives mostly in streams (particularly shady ones) and ponds and may sometimes be seen on land, though it avoids areas that are excessively dry. It has not yet been observed in estuaries. It lives in streams and rivers in the highlands of the Lesser Antilles, not including the Virgin Islands. They are known to hide under roots of trees, rocks and rotten wood where they dig shallow burrows which are oval in shape. They have been spotted at altitudes of 2,850 ft (870 m). They certainly inhabit the Boeri Lake and may inhabit Freshwater Lake.

The largest threat to the species is habitat destruction, and a protected area has been established on Dominica to conserve them.

== Reproduction ==
Reproduction takes place entirely in fresh water, and breeding takes place all year round; there does not seem to be a breeding season. The young undergo direct development, hatching as juveniles, without passing through any larval stages. The females carry the eggs and protect the young who stay with their mother for a period after hatching.

== Diet ==
Guinotia dentata is a mainly carnivorous (though partially herbivorous) animal which sometimes also acts as a scavenger or detritivore. It has been observed to eat minnows, prawns, and aquatic algae-like vegetation.

== Taxonomic history ==
Guinotia dentata was first described in 1825 by Pierre André Latreille. The specific epithet dentata means "toothed" in Latin. In 1965, Gerhard Pretzmann erected the genus Guinotia (a tribute to Danièle Guinot) and made Latreille's species the type species.

The following species were previously considered members of Guinotia:

- Guinotia pestai Pretzmann, 1965 (now Eudaniela pestai)
- Guinotia rodriguezi Pretzmann, 1968 (now Microthelphusa rodriguezi)
