= Brasiliothelphusa =

Conservation status
- Data Deficient (IUCN 3.1)

Scientific classification
- Kingdom: Animalia
- Phylum: Arthropoda
- Clade: Pancrustacea
- Class: Malacostraca
- Order: Decapoda
- Suborder: Pleocyemata
- Infraorder: Brachyura
- Family: Pseudothelphusidae
- Genus: Brasiliothelphusa
- Species: B. tapajoensis

Binomial name
- Brasiliothelphusa tapajoensis Magalhães & Türkay, 1986

Synonyms
- B. tapajoense Magalhães & Türkay, 1986

Genus of crabs

Brasiliothelphusa tapajoensis is a species of freshwater crabs in the family Pseudothelphusidae, and the only species in the genus Brasiliothelphusa. It was described in 1986 from specimens caught in the Rio Tapajós in the state of Pará, Brazil. It is listed as Data Deficient on the IUCN Red List.
