= Prionothelphusa =

Conservation status
- Least Concern (IUCN 3.1)

Scientific classification
- Kingdom: Animalia
- Phylum: Arthropoda
- Class: Malacostraca
- Order: Decapoda
- Suborder: Pleocyemata
- Infraorder: Brachyura
- Family: Pseudothelphusidae
- Genus: Prionothelphusa
- Species: P. eliasi

Binomial name
- Prionothelphusa eliasi Rodríguez, 1980

Genus of crabs

Prionothelphusa is a genus of freshwater crabs in the family Pseudothelphusidae, containing the single species Prionothelphusa eliasi. It lives in Colombia, Venezuela and Brazil in the drainages of the Rio Negro river draining the Guyana Shield, and is listed as Least Concern on the IUCN Red List.
