= Ernesto Medina =

Venezuelan plant ecologist

- Born: July 27, 1938 (age 88); Maracaibo, Venezuela
- Spouse: Elvira Cuevas

Ernesto A. Medina is an ecologist specializing in plant physiology when adapting to the changing environment. He is an elected international member of the National Academy of Sciences, and is an adjunct professor at the Center for Applied Tropical Ecology and Conservation (CREST-CATEC).

== Early life and education ==
Medina was born on July 27, 1938, in Maracaibo, Venezuela. After receiving his undergraduate degree in biology at the Universidad Central de Venezuela, he went to Stuttgart, Germany, where he completed a Ph.D. in agronomy at the University of Hohenheim.

== Career and research ==
He was assistant professor at the Central University of Venezuela, and joined the Department of Ecology at the Venezuela Institute for Scientific Research (IVIC) in 1970.

Since 2013, he held a position as adjunct professor at the Center for Applied Tropical Ecology and Conservation (CREST-CATEC) where he continued his research on plant physiology.

== Fields ==
Medina focuses on the study of plant populations and their environmental variables, particularly nutrient availability in natural ecosystems. His research includes the study of how a changing environment can affect photosynthesis, respiration, and nutrient uptake during various plant developmental stages. He studies how the plant community is affected by industrial pollution, change in land use caused by agriculture, pasture, lumbering and fire management, and he applies his findings in the area of global change research. His current research focuses on plant productivity responses to salinity, drought, and nutrient availability in coastal wetlands.

== Awards and honors ==
He holds an honorary membership in the Ecological Society of America supported by letters from P. D. Coley, T. A. as well as the international membership in the National Academy of Sciences. He was one of the inaugural Fellows of the Ecological Society of America, elected in 2012.

His honors also include Guggenheim Fellowship (1986) and a Lorenzo Mendoza Fleury Science Prize.

== Public engagement ==
In 1970, he did postdoctoral research at the Carnegie Institution (Stanford, California) on the photosynthesis of plants.

In 1979, Medina was a guest at both the Australian National University and Stanford University (USA).

Medina has also participated projects with MAB, INTECOL, SCOPE (Simons Collaboration on Ocean Processes and Ecology), OAS, and FAO. He has helped establish a school of plant ecology in Venezuela by training 27 students through IVIC and the Universidad Central de Venezuela.

== Personal life ==
Medina is married to Elvira Cuevas.
