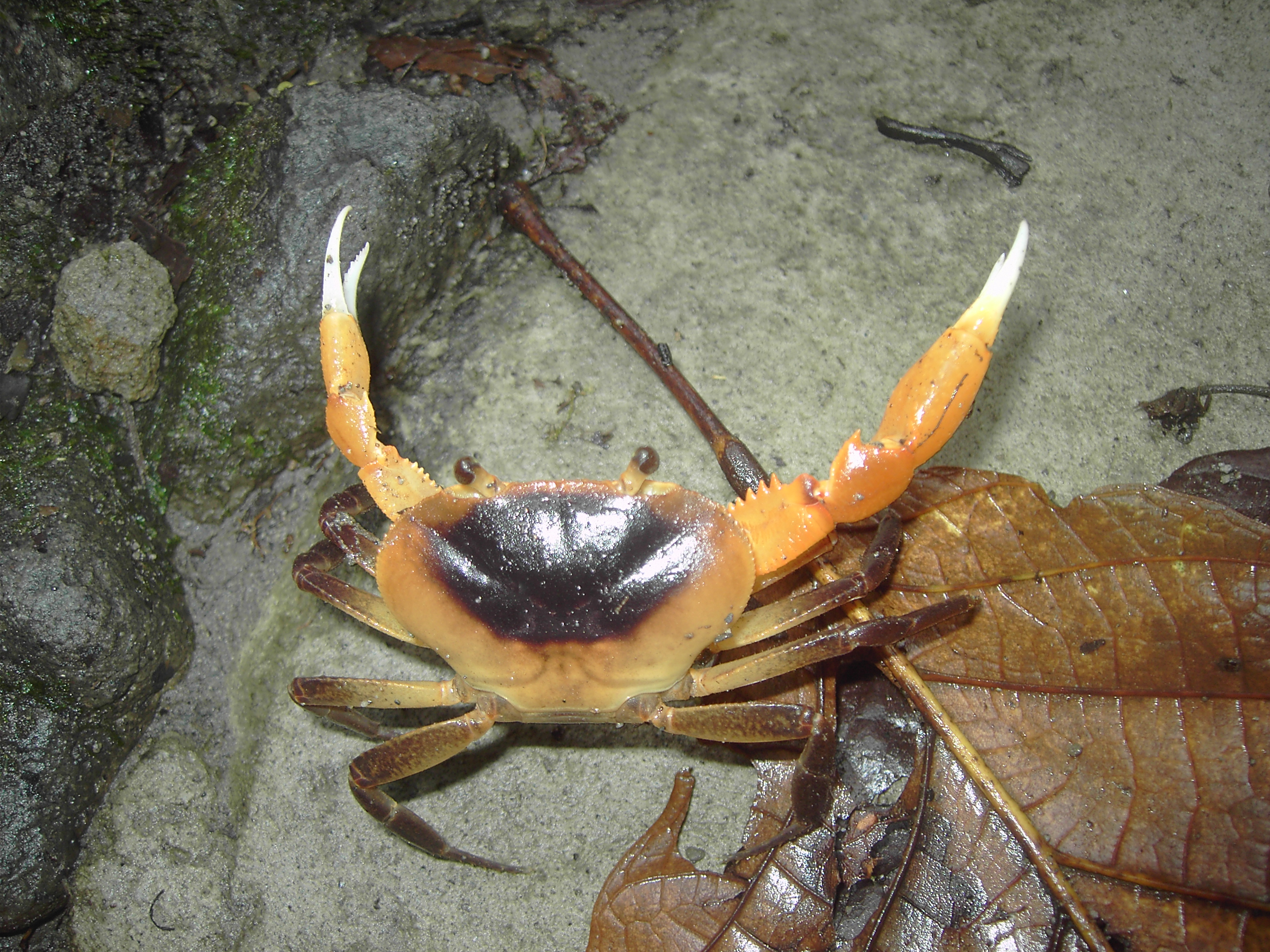
- Guinotia dentata

Scientific classification
- Kingdom: Animalia
- Phylum: Arthropoda
- Clade: Pancrustacea
- Class: Malacostraca
- Order: Decapoda
- Suborder: Pleocyemata
- Clade: Reptantia
- Infraorder: Brachyura
- Section: Eubrachyura
- Subsection: Heterotremata
- Superfamily: Pseudothelphusoidea; Ortmann, 1893
- Family: Pseudothelphusidae; Ortmann, 1893

= Pseudothelphusidae =

Family of crabs

Pseudothelphusidae is a family of freshwater crabs found chiefly in mountain streams in the Neotropics. They are believed to have originated in the Greater Antilles and then crossed to Central America via a Pliocene land bridge. Some species of this family are troglobitic.

== Parasitology ==
Pseudothelpshusids are of significance to humans because many species are secondary hosts for lung flukes of the genus Paragonimus. Predators of pseuthelphusid crabs include the yellow-spotted river turtle and the tufted capuchin.

== Taxonomy ==
The following subfamilies and genera are recognised:

Guinotinae Pretzmann, 1971

- Guinotia Pretzmann, 1965

Hypolobocerinae Pretzmann, 1971

- Colombiathelphusa Campos & Magalhães, 2014
- Hypolobocera Ortmann, 1897
- Lindacatalina Pretzmann, 1977
- Martiana Rodríguez, 1980
- Moritschus Pretzmann, 1965
- Neostrengeria Pretzmann, 1965

Kingsleyinae Bott, 1970

- Brasiliothelphusa Magalhães & Türkay, 1986
- Culterthelphusa Pedraza, 2017
- Eudaniela Pretzmann, 1971
- Fredius Pretzmann, 1967
- Kingsleya Ortmann, 1897
- Kunziana Pretzmann, 1971
- Melothelphusa Pedraza, Tavares & Magalhães, 2016
- Michaelthelphusa Magalhães, 2017
- Microthelphusa Pretzmann, 1968
- Neopseudothelphusa Pretzmann, 1965
- Oedothelphusa Rodríguez, 1980
- Orthothelphusa Rodríguez, 1980
- Prionothelphusa Rodríguez, 1980
- Rodriguezus Campos & Magalhães, 2005
- Schubarthelphusa Magalhães, Pinheiro & Mantelatto, 2024

Potamocarcininae Ortmann, 1897

- Potamocarcinus H. Milne-Edwards, 1853
- Spirocarcinus Pretzmann, 1972

Pseudothelphusinae Ortmann, 1893

- Alvarezius Moreno & Villalobos in Moreno-Juárez, Villalobos & Álvarez, 2022
- Disparithelphusa Smalley & Adkinson, 1984
- Ehecatusa Ng & Low, 2010
- Mokayathelphusa Moreno, Villalobos & Álvarez in Moreno-Juárez, Villalobos & Álvarez, 2022
- Pseudothelphusa de Saussure, 1857
- Smalleyus Álvarez, 1989
- Tehuana Rodríguez & Smalley in Smalley, 1970
- Xoconochcothelphusa Villalobos-Hiriart, Moreno-Juárez & Álvarez, 2024

Ptychophallinae Álvarez, Ojeda, Souza-Carvalho, Villalobos, Magalhães, Wehrtmann & Mantelatto, 2020

- Achlidon Smalley, 1964
- Allacanthos Smalley, 1964
- Camptophallus Smalley, 1965
- Ptychophallus Smalley, 1964

Raddausinae Álvarez, Ojeda, Souza-Carvalho, Villalobos, Magalhães, Wehrtmann & Mantelatto, 2020

- Elsalvadoria Bott, 1967
- Emberacarcinus Magalhães & Ng, 2019
- Lobithelphusa Rodríguez, 1982
- Odontothelphusa Rodríguez, 1982
- Phrygiopilus Smalley, 1970
- Raddaus Pretzmann, 1965
- Spirothelphusa Pretzmann, 1965
- Sylvathelphusa Villalobos & Álvarez, 2013
- Typhlopseudothelphusa Rioja, 1952
- Tzotzilthelphusa Villalobos & Álvarez, 2013
- Villalobosius Ng & Low, 2010
- Zilchia Pretzmann, 1968

Strengerianinae Rodríguez, 1982

- Chaceus Pretzmann, 1965
- Eidocamptophallus Rodríguez & Hobbs, 1989
- Phallangothelphusa Pretzmann, 1965
- Strengeriana Pretzmann, 1971
