= Oedothelphusa =

Conservation status
- Data Deficient (IUCN 3.1)

Scientific classification
- Kingdom: Animalia
- Phylum: Arthropoda
- Class: Malacostraca
- Order: Decapoda
- Suborder: Pleocyemata
- Infraorder: Brachyura
- Family: Pseudothelphusidae
- Genus: Oedothelphusa; Rodríguez, 1980
- Species: O. orientalis

Binomial name
- Oedothelphusa orientalis Rodríguez, 1980

Genus of crabs

Oedothelphusa is a genus of crabs in the family Pseudothelphusidae, containing the single species Oedothelphusa orientalis. It is known from a single site at an altitude of 1,210 metres (3,970 ft) in Monagas state, Venezuela.
