= Gerhard Pretzmann =

Austrian zoologist and paleontologist

- Born: 8 September 1929; Vienna, Austria
- Died: 20 January 2013 (aged 83); Vienna, Austria
- Education: University of Vienna
- Known for: Research on freshwater crabs, contributions to environmental ethics, and evolutionary theory
- Scientific career
- Fields: Zoology, Paleontology, Ethology, Evolutionary theory
- Workplaces: Natural History Museum, Vienna
- Thesis: Soziales Verhalten bei Süßwasserfischen (Social behavior in freshwater fish) (1958)
- Doctoral advisor: Konrad Lorenz and Otto Koenig

Gerhard Pretzmann (8 September 1929 – 20 January 2013) was an Austrian zoologist and paleontologist at the Natural History Museum, Vienna. He founded and led the Vienna section of the Working Group on Evolution, Future of Humanity and Questions of Meaning (AGEMUS).

== Biography ==
Pretzmann studied in Vienna under Otto Koenig and Konrad Lorenz and wrote a dissertation on "Social behavior in freshwater fish." He received his doctorate in philosophy in 1958.

He first worked at the Institute of Hygiene (Virology–Ecology) and, at the same time, began working at the Natural History Museum, Vienna, where he remained until his retirement as head of department. He was also active in public education. Pretzmann co-founded and served for many years on the board of the Environmental Forum, where he led the working group on environmental ethics. Along with Alexander Tollmann, he founded the political party United Greens of Austria (VGÖ).

He was also Secretary-General of the Bertha von Suttner Peace Mission, which later made him an honorary member. Pretzmann died on 20 January 2013 after a long illness. The funeral oration at his burial in the Vienna Central Cemetery was given by Karl Edlinger, then curator at the Natural History Museum, Vienna.

== Research ==
Pretzmann conducted successful research in carcinology, describing several rare subspecies of freshwater crabs, including three subspecies of Potamon potamios.

From his numerous research expeditions and collaborations, he published more than 100 scientific papers in virology, ethology, paleontology, and evolutionary theory, as well as many popular science contributions. He organized annual scientific symposia on various topics.

Pretzmann founded and directed the Vienna section of the "Working Group on Evolution, Future of Humanity and Questions of Meaning" (AGEMUS). Established in 1981 at the suggestion of German geneticist Carsten Bresch, the group aimed to promote scientific research in the spirit of Pierre Teilhard de Chardin. By 1983, there were already 24 groups in Germany, France, and Austria.

== Selected works ==
- Zur Bedeutung der primären Motivation für den Terrorismus – The importance of the primary motivation for terrorism. In: Erwin Bader (ed.): Terrorismus. Eine Herausforderung unserer Zeit. P. Lang, Vienna 2007, ISBN 978-3-631-54923-0, pp. 131–136.
- Beitrag zur allgemeinen Evolutionstheorie. Vienna 2002.
- (ed.): Umweltethik. Manifest eines verantwortungsvollen Umgangs mit der Natur. Graz 2001.
- Abschied von Illusionen. Fazit des XX. Jahrhunderts. AGEMUS, Vienna 1999.
- Gedanken zur Noosphäre. In: PCNEWS edu. February 1997, p. 31 f. PDF.
- Gibt es eine objektive Ethik? Evolutionäre Grundlagen menschlichen Handelns und Wertens. In: Umweltethik. Beiträge zur Grundlegung zukunftsverträglicher Werthaltungen. Umweltforum 6, October 1996, pp. 20–22.
- Grundzüge eines ökologischen Humanismus. VWGÖ, Vienna 1992, ISBN 3-85369-857-3.
- Die Liebe. Natur und Kultur. Versuch einer Synopsis. Self-published, Vienna 1981.
- Ergebnisse einiger Sammelreisen nach Vorderasien. In: Annalen des Naturhistorischen Museums in Wien. Vol. 77, Vienna 1976, pp. 453–456.
