= Arnold Edward Ortmann =

Prussian-born United States naturalist and zoologist (1863-1927)

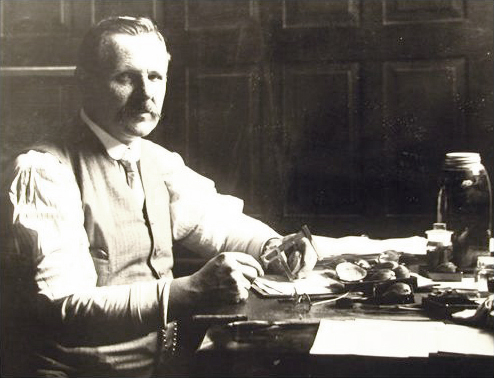
A.E. Ortmann

Arnold Edward Ortmann (April 8, 1863 – January 3, 1927) was a Prussian-born United States naturalist and zoologist who specialized in malacology.

== Biography ==
Ortmann was born in Magdeburg, Prussia on April 8, 1863. A student of Ernst Haeckel, he graduated from the University of Jena in 1885 with a Ph.D.; he had also studied at the University of Kiel and the University of Strasbourg. From 1886 on, he worked as an instructor at the University of Strasbourg. Together with Haeckel, he participated in an expedition to Zanzibar in 1890/91. Three years later, he emigrated to the United States, where he got a post as the curator of the department of invertebrate paleontology at Princeton University. He was elected to the American Philosophical Society in 1897. In 1899, he participated in the Peary Relief expedition, and one year later, he was naturalized as a U.S. citizen.

In 1903, he moved to Pittsburgh. He became the curator of invertebrate zoology at the Carnegie Museum and from 1910 on, he was professor of physical geography at the University of Pittsburgh, where he also obtained in 1911 the additional degree of an Sc.D. In 1925, he became the chair of zoology at the University of Pittsburgh. He died in Pittsburgh on January 3, 1927.

== Work ==
Ortmann's thorough taxonomic studies of freshwater mussels and crustaceans with a special focus on the geographical distribution of species was a fundamental groundwork that is even valid today. In 1920, he formulated "Ortmann's Law of Stream Position", which said that a species of mussels can have a different appearance depending on where in a river system the individuals live:

While studying the Naiad-shells of the upper Ohio-drainage, the fact was forced upon my mind, that certain species which inhabit the headwaters and smaller streams are represented, in the larger streams, by different, but very similar forms, which are distinguished from them chiefly by one character, namely obesity. The headwater-forms are rather compressed or flat, the large-river-forms more convex and swollen. I also found that in the rivers of medium size intergrades between the extremes are actually present.

— A. E. Ortmann (1920)

This observation helped greatly to simplify the taxonomy of molluscs, because previously, researchers had all too often assigned such different morphotypes to different species.

The standard author abbreviation "A.E.Ortmann" is used to indicate Ortmann when citing a botanical name.

== Publications ==
- Grundzüge der Marinen Tiergeographie ("Foundations of marine animal geography", 1886)
- Continuation of "Die Decapodon" from Bronn's Klassen und Ordnungen des Tierreichs (1898-1900)
- Tertiary Invertebrates of the Princeton Expedition to Patagonia (1902)

He was associate editor of American Naturalist for a time, and contributed to periodicals.
