= Mary J. Rathbun =

American carcinologist

Mary Jane Rathbun
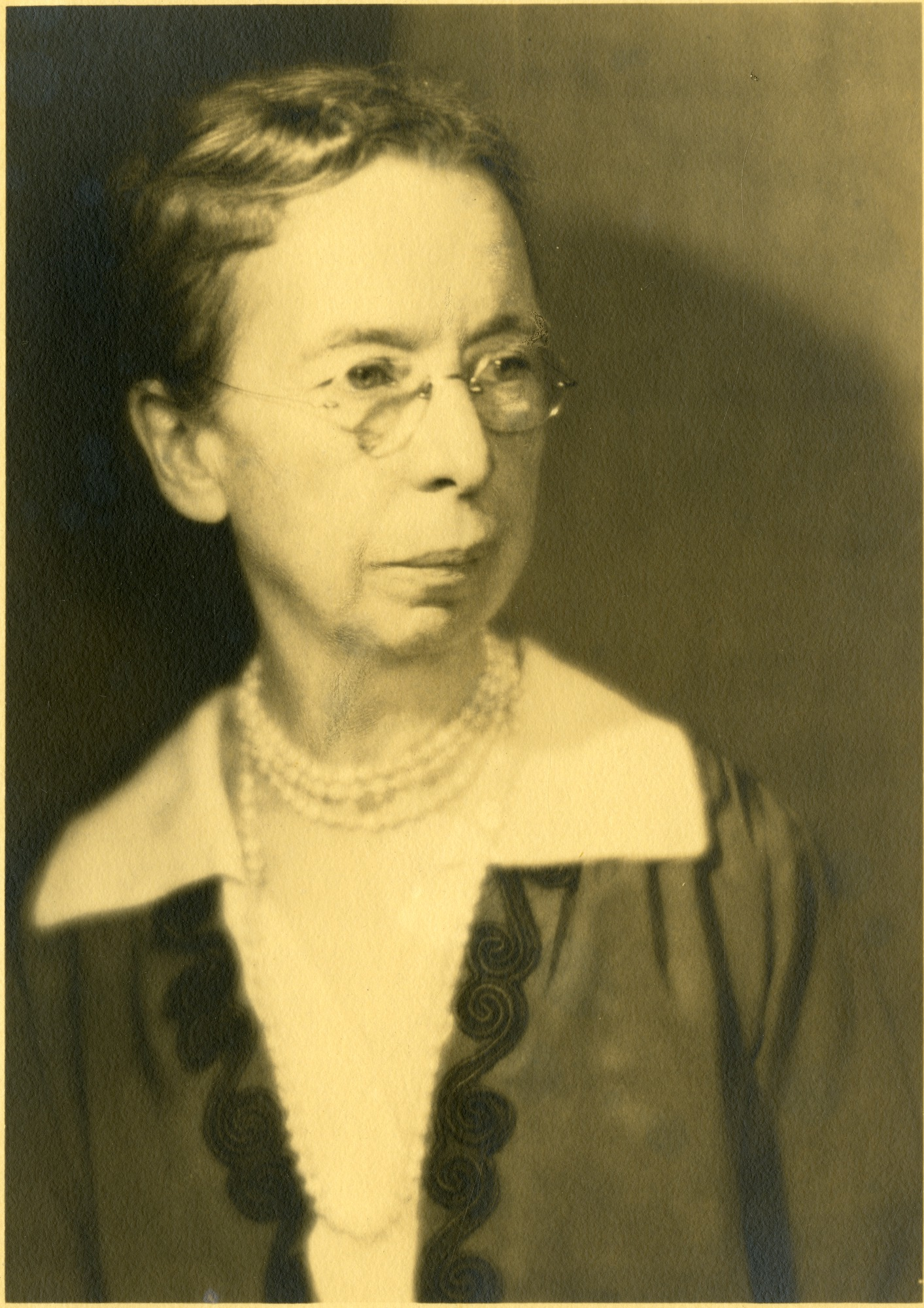
- Born: June 11, 1860; Buffalo, New York
- Died: April 4, 1943 (aged 82); Washington, D.C.
- Education: George Washington University
- Scientific career
- Fields: Carcinology
- Workplaces: Smithsonian Institution
- Author abbrev. (zoology): Rathbun

Mary Jane Rathbun (June 11, 1860 – April 4, 1943) was an American zoologist who specialized in crustaceans. She worked at the Smithsonian Institution from 1884 until her death. She described more than a thousand new species and subspecies and many higher taxa.

== Biography ==
Mary Jane Rathbun was born on June 11, 1860, in Buffalo, New York, the youngest of five children of Charles Rathbun and Jane Furey. Her mother died when she was only one year old, and Mary was therefore "thrown on her own resources." She was educated in Buffalo, graduating in 1878, but never attended college.

Rathbun was 4 ft 6 in (1.37 m) tall, and was noted for having a dry sense of humor.

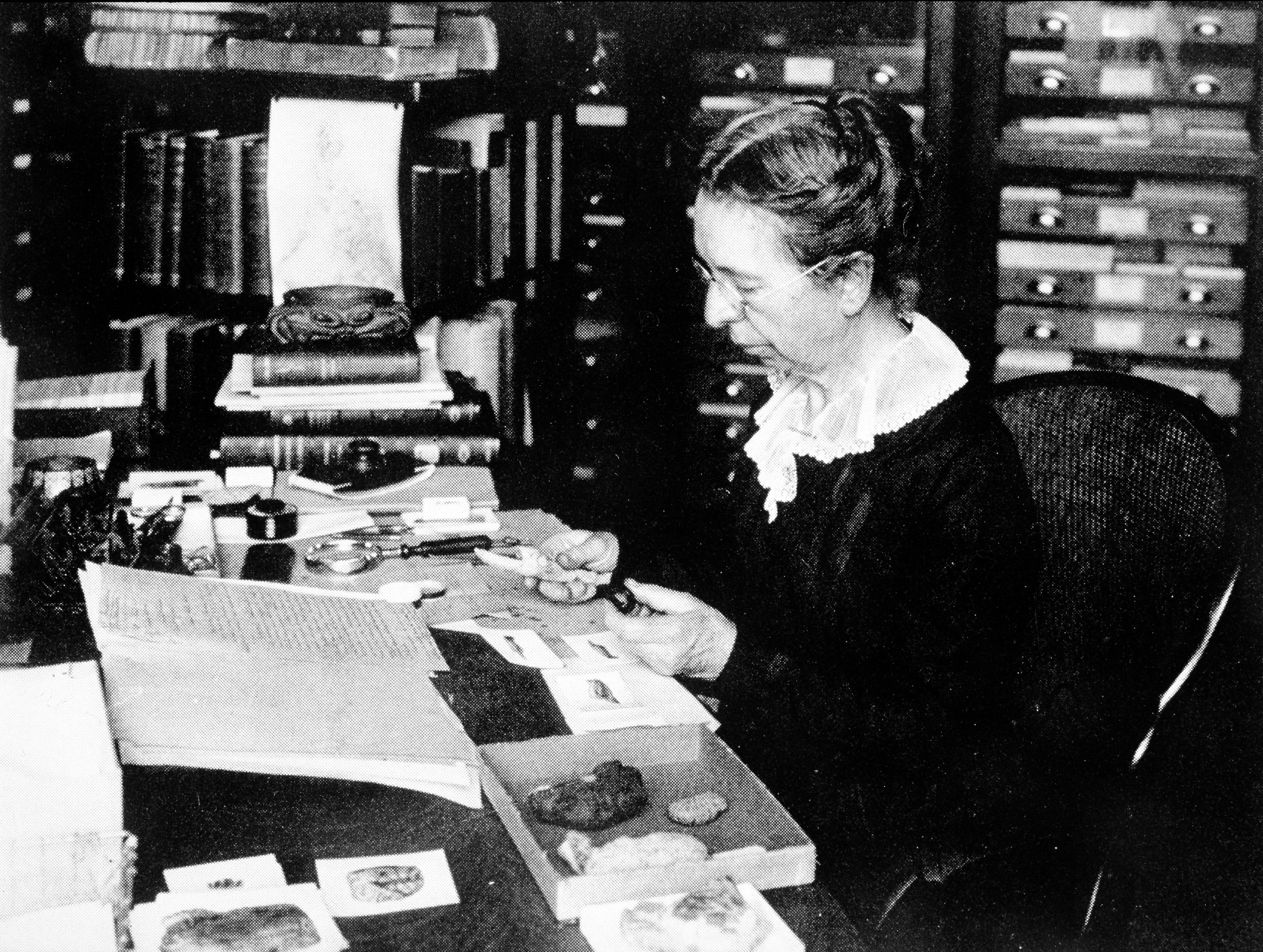
Rathbun at work

Rathbun first saw the ocean in 1881 when she accompanied her brother, Richard Rathbun, to Woods Hole, Massachusetts. He was employed as a scientific assistant to Addison Emery Verrill, alongside Verrill's chief assistant, the carcinologist Sidney Irving Smith. Rathbun helped label, sort and record Smith's specimens, and worked on crustaceans ever since.

For three years, Rathbun worked on a voluntary basis for her brother, before being granted a clerkship by Spencer Fullerton Baird at the Smithsonian Institution.

After 28 years of working at the museum, Rathbun was promoted to assistant curator in charge of the Division of Crustacea. In 1915, after her retirement, the Smithsonian Institution designated Rathbun an "Honorary Research Associate", and in 1916 she was granted an honorary master's degree by the University of Pittsburgh. She qualified for a Ph.D. at George Washington University in 1917. Rathbun was a member of the American Association for the Advancement of Science, the Washington Academy of Sciences, and the Wild Flower Preservation Society.

Rathbun died in Washington, D.C., on April 4, 1943, at the age of 82, from complications associated with a broken hip.

== Publications ==
Rathbun's first publication was co-written with James Everard Benedict and concerned the genus Panopeus; it was published in 1891. She officially retired on December 31, 1914, but did not stop working until her death. Her largest work was Les crabes d'eau douce ('Freshwater Crabs'), which was originally intended as a single publication, but was eventually published in three volumes between 1904 and 1906. She wrote or cowrote 166 papers in total, including descriptions of 1147 new species and subspecies, 63 new genera, one subfamily, 3 families and a superfamily, as well as other nomenclatural novelties. The taxa first described by Rathbun include important commercial species such as the Atlantic blue crab Callinectes sapidus, and the tanner crab, Chionoecetes bairdi.

== Taxa ==
A number of taxa have been named in honor of Mary J. Rathbun:

- Hamatoscalpellum rathbunae (Pilsbry, 1907)
- Maera rathbunae Pearse, 1908
- Paromola rathbuni Porter Mosso, 1908
- Synalphaeus rathbunae Coutiere, 1909
- Candidiopotamon rathbunae De Man, 1914
- Pasiphaea rathbunae (Stebbing, 1914)
- Petrolisthes rathbunae Schmitt, 1916
- Periclimenes rathbunae Schmitt, 1924
- Alpheus rathbunae (Schmitt, 1924)
- Campylonotus rathbunae Schmitt, 1926
- Callinectes rathbunae Contreras, 1930
- Eriosachila rathbunae Maury, 1930
- Tritodynamia rathbunae Shen, 1932
- Sacculina rathbunae Boschma, 1933
- Pinnixa rathbunae Sakai, 1934
- Emerita rathbunae Schmitt, 1935
- Callianassa rathbunae Schmitt, 1935
- Solenocera rathbunae Ramadan, 1938
- Thunor rathbunae Armstrong, 1949
- Lysmata rathbunae Chace, 1970
- Xanthias rathbunae Takeda, 1976
- Cyphocarcinus rathbunae Griffin & Tranter, 1986
- Asterias rathbunae Britajev, 1989
- Lophaxius rathbunae Kensley, 1989
- Rhynchocinetes rathbunae Okuno, 1996
- Palaeopinnixa rathbunae Schweitzer & Feldmann, 2000
- Marratha Ng & Clark, 2003

== See also ==
- Timeline of women in science
