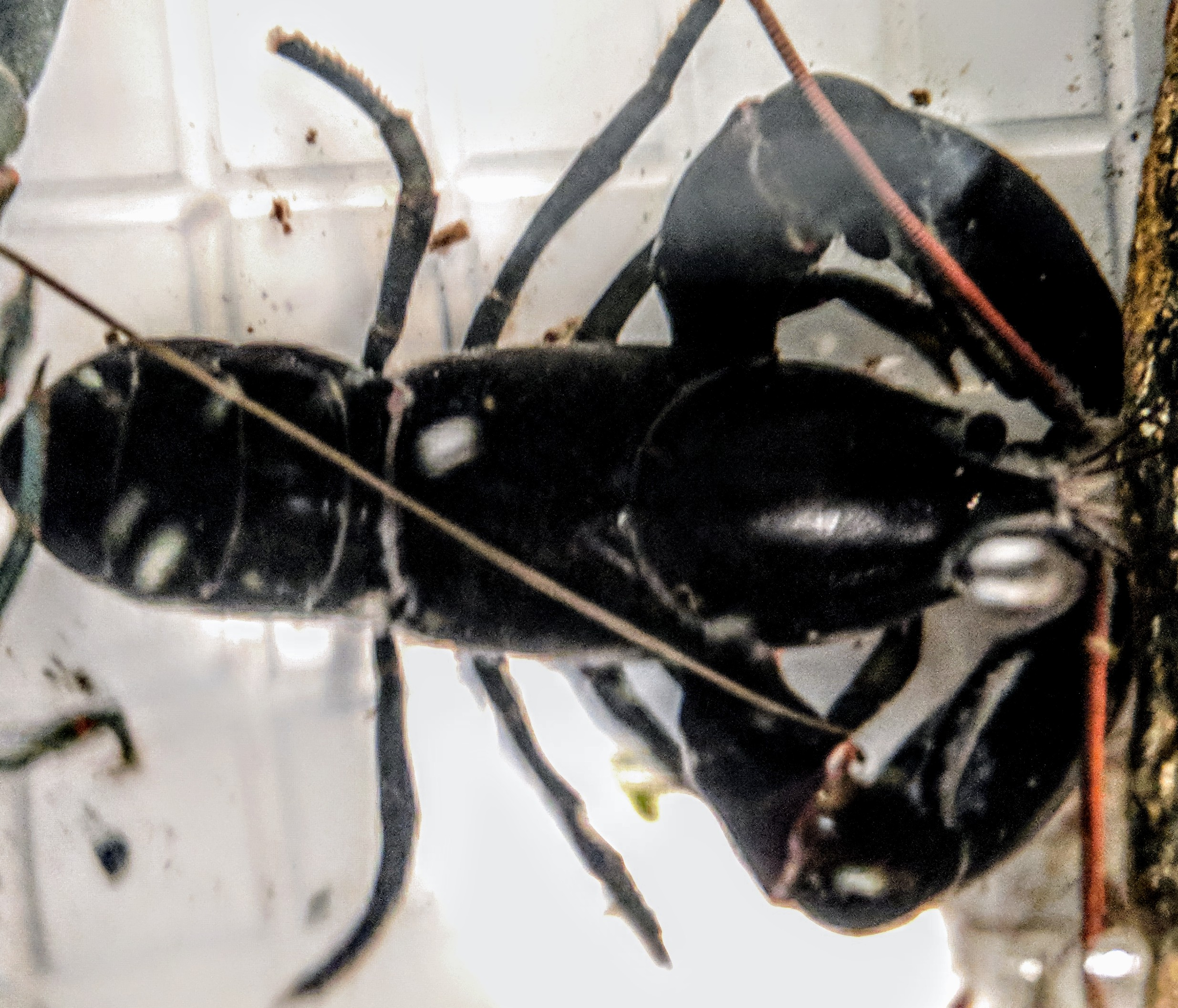

Conservation status
- Least Concern (IUCN 3.1)

Scientific classification
- Kingdom: Animalia
- Phylum: Arthropoda
- Clade: Pancrustacea
- Class: Malacostraca
- Order: Decapoda
- Suborder: Pleocyemata
- Family: Parastacidae
- Genus: Cherax
- Species: C. preissii

Binomial name
- Cherax preissii Erichson, 1846

= Cherax preissii =

Species of crayfish

Cherax preissii, the common koonac, is a Western Australian freshwater crustacean in the Parastacidae family.

Its common name of "koonac" is also applied to another Western Australian Cherax species of crustacean C. glaber, the "glossy koonac", which is restricted to a much smaller region of WA.

Koonacs can grow up to 20 cm and may be coloured black and red, dark brown, or bluish black. They have broad, serrated claws and four keels on the head, two of which are prominent.

== Ecology ==
Koonacs are endemic to the southwest of Western Australia, in wetlands, permanent and seasonal waterways, and farm dams. They are able to survive seasonal dryness for several months by digging burrows.

Although they are rated as "least concern" on the IUCN redlist, local populations may be under threat by introduced eastern states yabbies such as Cherax destructor and Cherax albidus through competition for food and habitat.

== Catching ==
Although catching koonacs is not seasonally restricted, fishing for marron is. The rules for fishing marron should be taken into account when fishing for koonacs, as this might involve the use of equipment (e.g. traps) that is illegal in marron-inhabited areas.
