= Cherax quinquecarinatus =

Conservation status
- Least Concern (IUCN 3.1)

Scientific classification
- Kingdom: Animalia
- Phylum: Arthropoda
- Class: Malacostraca
- Order: Decapoda
- Suborder: Pleocyemata
- Family: Parastacidae
- Genus: Cherax
- Species: C. quinquecarinatus

Binomial name
- Cherax quinquecarinatus J. E. Gray in Eyre, 1845

Synonyms
- Astacus quinque-carinatus Gray in Eyre, 1845; Cherax glabrimanus Riek, 1967; Cherax neocarinatus Riek, 1967

Species of crayfish

Cherax quinquecarinatus is a small freshwater crayfish endemic to the south-west corner of Australia. It is one of two species known as gilgie, or jilgi, which is a seasonal food source for people of the region. Gilgies are found throughout a biogeographically isolated region of the coastal south of Western Australia and are significant in the ecology of aquatic systems of that bioregion.

== Description ==
Reaching a maximum of 130 mm, C. quinquecarinatus is one of the smallest in the genus Cherax. They vary in colour from light to black-brown. Their heads have five keels (as inferred by the epithet), two pairs of spines at rostrum, and none on their telsons. Their chelipeds are rounded and narrow and are often speckled. While restricted to southwestern Western Australia, it has the widest distribution in the biogeographic region. It is found in all habitats containing freshwater crayfish, congeners such as Cherax tenuimanus (marron), or the genus Engaewa.

The species has been traditionally hunted by tribes in the region. This involved elaborate seasonal rituals relating to taboos of eating. This was claimed to have been linked to an early form of environmentalism and sustainability. Family groups (moieties) would establish temporary claim to territory and lay fishtraps and use scoops to gather marron and jilgi. Some tribes travelled great distances to join the hunt and each indigenous group carried unique and particular oral traditions regarding this practice. Indigenous artwork has been shown to actually convey important information about different species and selective harvesting. The Noongar people are also known to have caught and eaten the animal.

In Western Australia, recreational fishing (marroning) includes gilgies in the catch, but it is not considered to be a commercial species.

== Ecology ==
The gilgie lives in permanent and temporary water courses in the south of Western Australia. It can survive periods of drought through aestivation - burrowing down and entering a state of dormancy.

They are widely found within the region, having a greater range of environments. These can include permanent lakes and areas receiving water for 5–7 months of the year. It lives in complex and narrow environments, such as silty river beds between fallen trees, feeding on decaying organic matter and receiving protection from predation. The animal undergoes many moults and these decrease with age. Sexual maturity can occur from two years and at half their fully mature size. Spawning occurs from late winter to early summer.

Their conservation is that of all the freshwater crayfish species of the South West, recognised as having a high degree of importance due to the long-term isolation of the bioregion. However, protection of the two endemic genera is usually focused on the commercial species. Few studies have been made to the specific threat. The region has undergone extensive logging and intensive cultivation which are known to have impacted upon the water tables and courses. The species is sensitive to pollutants such as petroleum products and organochlorines and is known to accumulate heavy metals.

The species is assumed to have an integral role, through the consumption of decaying organic matter, in the ecology of its region and contributing to the biodiversity. High sensitivity to toxins and pollutants has been seen as an indicator of the presence of these within a habitat.

Some populations have been exposed to porcelain disease (Thelohania) and the introduction of crayfish diseases threaten entire populations.

The gilgie is used in permaculture gardens in Western Australia. They enable ponds and pools to be self-sustaining.

== See also ==
- Cherax destructor – common yabby
- Cherax quadricarinatus – Australian red claw crayfish
- Cherax tenuimanus – Margaret River marron or hairy marron
