= C. pulcher =

C. pulcher may refer to:

- Calloctenus pulcher, a beetle in the family Cerambycidae
- Calothorax pulcher, the beautiful sheartail, a hummingbird species
- Cherax pulcher, a species of crayfish from Indonesia
- Conus pulcher, a sea snail
