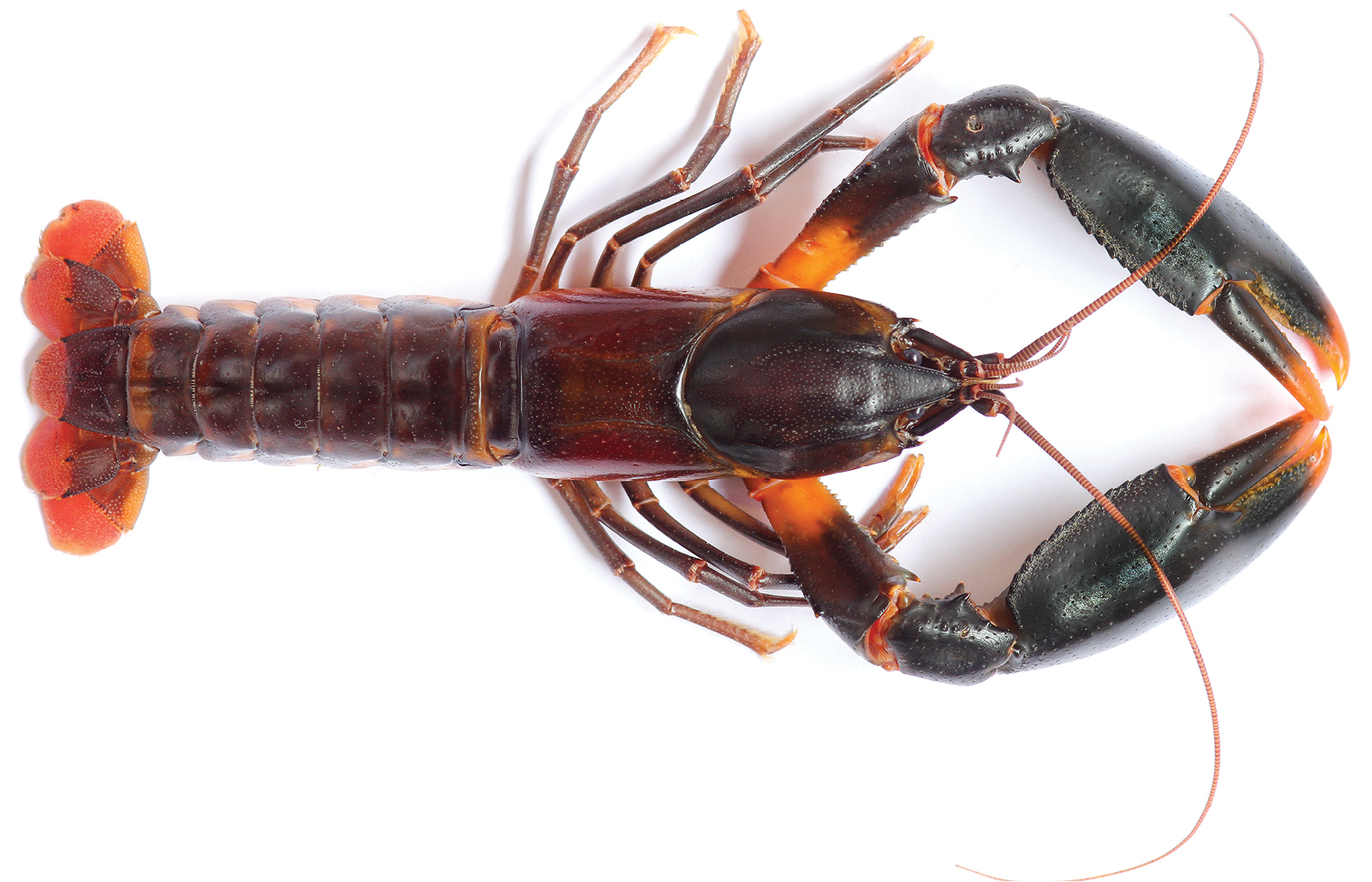
- Male

Scientific classification
- Kingdom: Animalia
- Phylum: Arthropoda
- Clade: Pancrustacea
- Class: Malacostraca
- Order: Decapoda
- Suborder: Pleocyemata
- Family: Parastacidae
- Genus: Cherax
- Species: C. snowden

Binomial name
- Cherax snowden Lukhaup, Panteleit & Schrimpf, 2015

Synonyms
- Cherax subterigneus

= Cherax snowden =

Species of crayfish

Cherax snowden is a species of crayfish from West Papua in Indonesia (Oinsok River Drainage, Sawiat District, Chendravasikh and Kepala Burung Peninsulas). In the wild, they live in freshwater river tributaries. It is popular as a freshwater aquarium pet across Asia, Europe, and North America because of its orange-tipped claws. Specimens were previously misidentified as members of Cherax holthuisi, also from West Papua.

Adult body length is 10 cm (3.9 in) for males and 7 cm (2.8 in) for females. Different shades of green (brownish green and bluish green) is the predominant body color throughout their lives, their claw tips are orange. The first samples became known in the West in 2006 by means of internet pet shops. By the time it was examined by professional zoologists in 2015, Cherax snowden, a new species of crayfish (Crustacea, Decapoda, Parastacidae) from the Kepala Burung (Vogelkop) Peninsula in Irian Jaya (West Papua, Indonesia) was already popular as a pet in Europe, East Asia and America under the name "orange tip". The scientific species description was published by German zoologists from the Institute for Environmental Sciences University of Koblenz and Landau. The species was named after Edward Snowden to honor his contribution to the freedom of speech.

== See also ==
- List of organisms named after famous people (born 1975–present)
