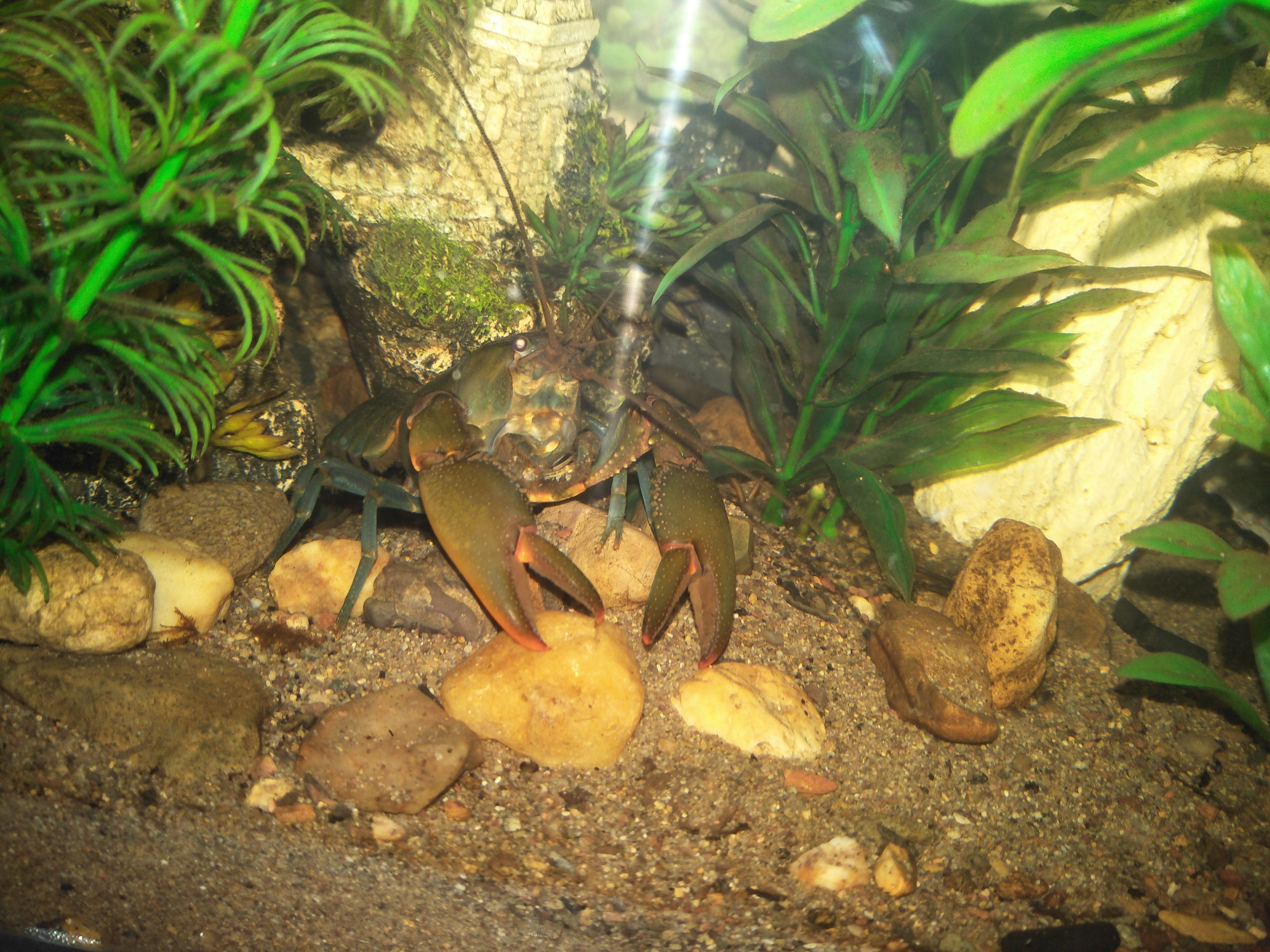

Scientific classification
- Kingdom: Animalia
- Phylum: Arthropoda
- Clade: Pancrustacea
- Class: Malacostraca
- Order: Decapoda
- Suborder: Pleocyemata
- Family: Parastacidae
- Genus: Cherax
- Species: C. depressus

Binomial name
- Cherax depressus Riek, 1951

= Cherax depressus =

Species of crayfish

Cherax depressus, the orange fingered yabby, is an Australian freshwater crustacean in the family Parastacidae.

== Description ==
C. depressus is a relatively small species of yabby (crayfish) reaching a maximum of 15 cm (5.9 in) in length. It is commonly known as the orange fingered yabby due to the orange tipping on the end of their chelae (pincers).

These yabbies dwell in dug burrows alongside small creeks or ephemeral waterways and can survive dry conditions for several years by lying dormant in burrows sunk deep into the muddy creek beds, coming out into open water only during heavy rainfall. They dig their burrows with their large pincers, burrowing generally around 50–80 cm deep, but can dig deeper during droughts if necessary. Even when not in drought, the yabby will rarely emerge from its burrow chambers, making it a rarely seen species.

Colour is highly variable and depends on the environmental conditions and habitat; yabbies can range from black, blue-black, dark brown, dark red, dark green, dark blue and brown-red. Although usually consisting of a brownish-red top side and a light or dark blue underside and legs.

Juveniles may be found inhabiting open water and small creeks as they slowly develop their digging skills. Adults will rarely venture outside their burrows unless mating or desperate for food.

== Distribution ==
C. depressus are found along the South Eastern coast of Queensland and northern New South Wales.

== In the aquarium ==
These yabbies are often kept as aquarium pets because they require little maintenance and the fact they can survive months without eating.
