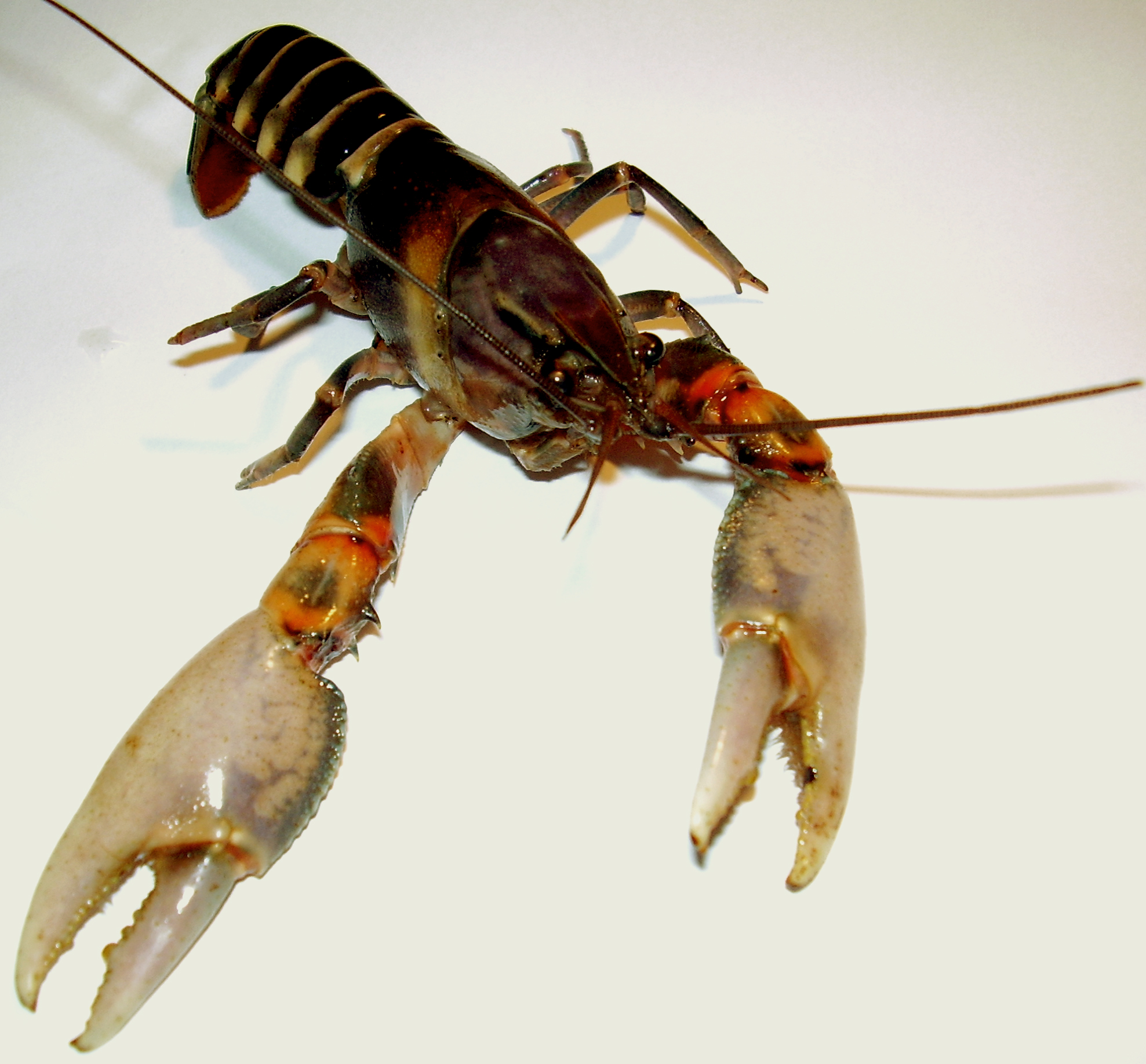
- Cherax papuanus

Scientific classification
- Kingdom: Animalia
- Phylum: Arthropoda
- Clade: Pancrustacea
- Class: Malacostraca
- Order: Decapoda
- Suborder: Pleocyemata
- Family: Parastacidae
- Genus: Cherax; Erichson, 1846

Type species
- Astacus preissii Erichson, 1846

= Cherax =

Genus of crayfishes

Cherax, commonly known as yabby/yabbies in Australia, is the most widespread genus of fully aquatic crayfish in the Southern Hemisphere. Various species of cherax may be found in both still and flowing bodies of freshwater across most of Australia and New Guinea.

== Habitat ==
Members of the Cherax genus can be found in lakes, rivers, and streams across most of Australia and New Guinea. Together with Euastacus, it is also the largest crayfish genus in the Southern Hemisphere.

The most common and widely distributed species in Australia is the common yabby (C. destructor). It is generally found in lowland rivers and streams, lakes, swamps, and impoundments at low to medium altitude, largely within the Murray–Darling Basin. Common yabbies are found in many ephemeral waterways, and can survive dry conditions for long periods of time (at least several years) by aestivating (lying dormant) in burrows sunk deep into muddy creek and swamp beds.

In New Guinea, Cherax crayfish are found widely in rivers, streams, and lakes, with a particularly high diversity in the Paniai Lakes. New Guinea is also home to the only known cave-living crayfish in the Southern Hemisphere, C. acherontis.

Some species are very colourful and sometimes seen in the freshwater aquarium trade. A new species, coloured bright blue, was found in streams in West Papua after being discovered via the aquarium trade in Australia around 2015, and was named Cherax pulcher, pulcher meaning "beautiful".

== Reproduction ==
The mating season for Cherax is during early spring. After fertilisation, eggs develop inside the mother's body for 4 to 6 weeks. After that period, the eggs transition to the outside of the mother's body and rest on the female's tail. Then the eggs continue to develop and hatch in spring.

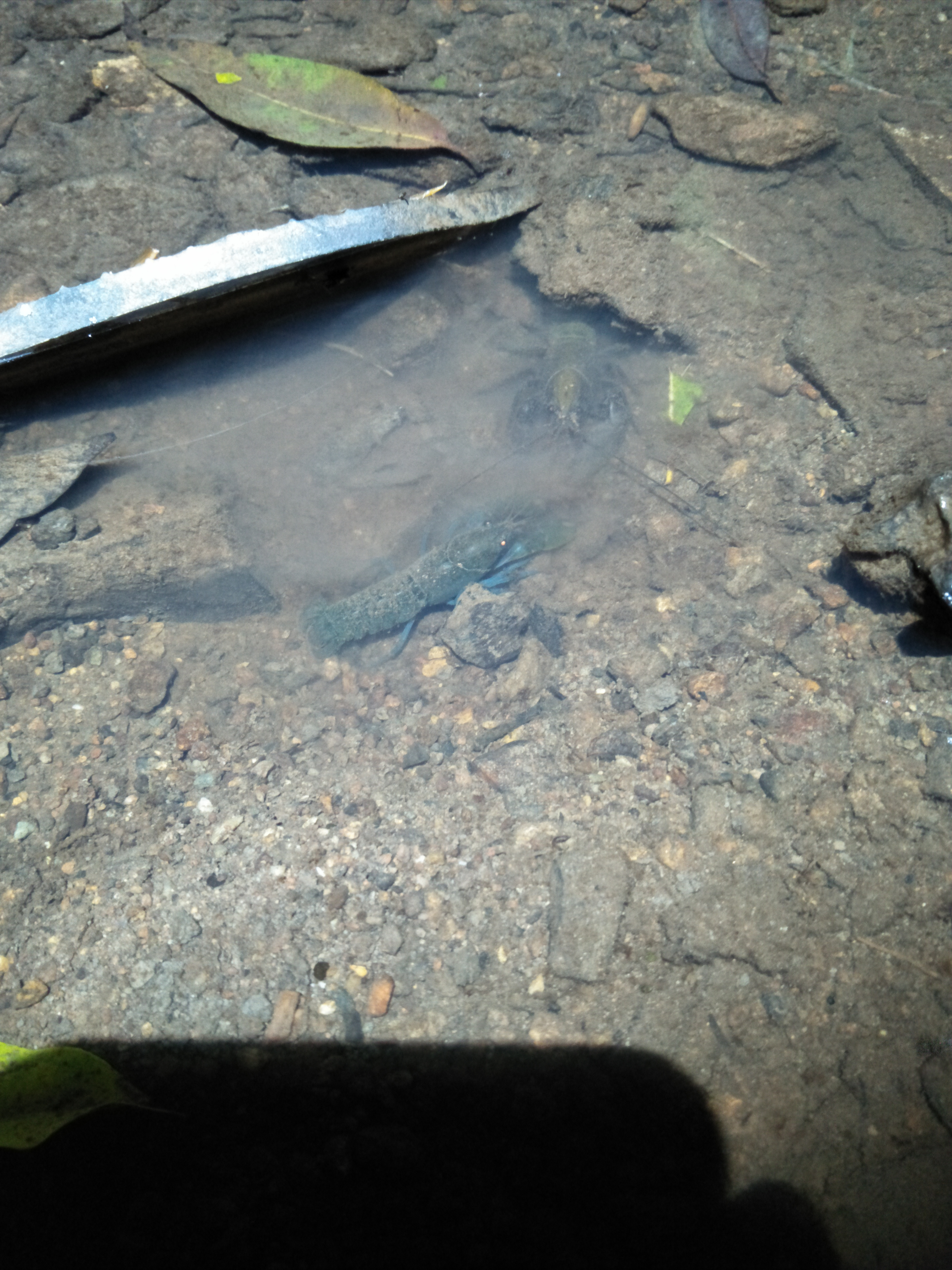
Yabbies can inhabit shallow creeks during the wet season and burying themselves during droughts

Both sexes of Cherax are selective with copulation partners. Females tend to choose males with a larger central mass (abdomen and tail) and cheliped. Males tend to select copulation partners who have larger body sizes and are virgins. Opposed to females who were more dominant or had symmetrical chelipeds.

As part of a mating/copulation ritual, males and females fight each other. This allows the female to test the strength of the male to determine if he will produce viable offspring. During the fight, both release urine. The female's release of urine triggers a sexual response from the male. The male's release of urine is an aggressive response towards the fight with the female. When the male smells the female's urine, he will stop releasing his own, hoping the female will allow him to copulate.

Once the female allows it, the male will position himself on her back and deposit his sperm. Unlike other crayfish species, Cherax dispar does not use its cheliped to cage females during copulation. It is mainly used during mating when the males and females fight.

== Behaviour ==
In instances when displaying males have chelae of a similar size, they will engage in combat and those with the greater chelae closing force will win.

Female C. dispar use honest signalling of strength, meaning the size of their chelae is a good indication to other C. dispar about that individual's strength. Individuals possessing larger chelae engage in more agonistic encounters and are also more likely to win. In a study of female C. dispar chelae strength, researchers found that chelae size also indirectly indicated the dominance of the female because of its honest indication of strength.

== Species ==
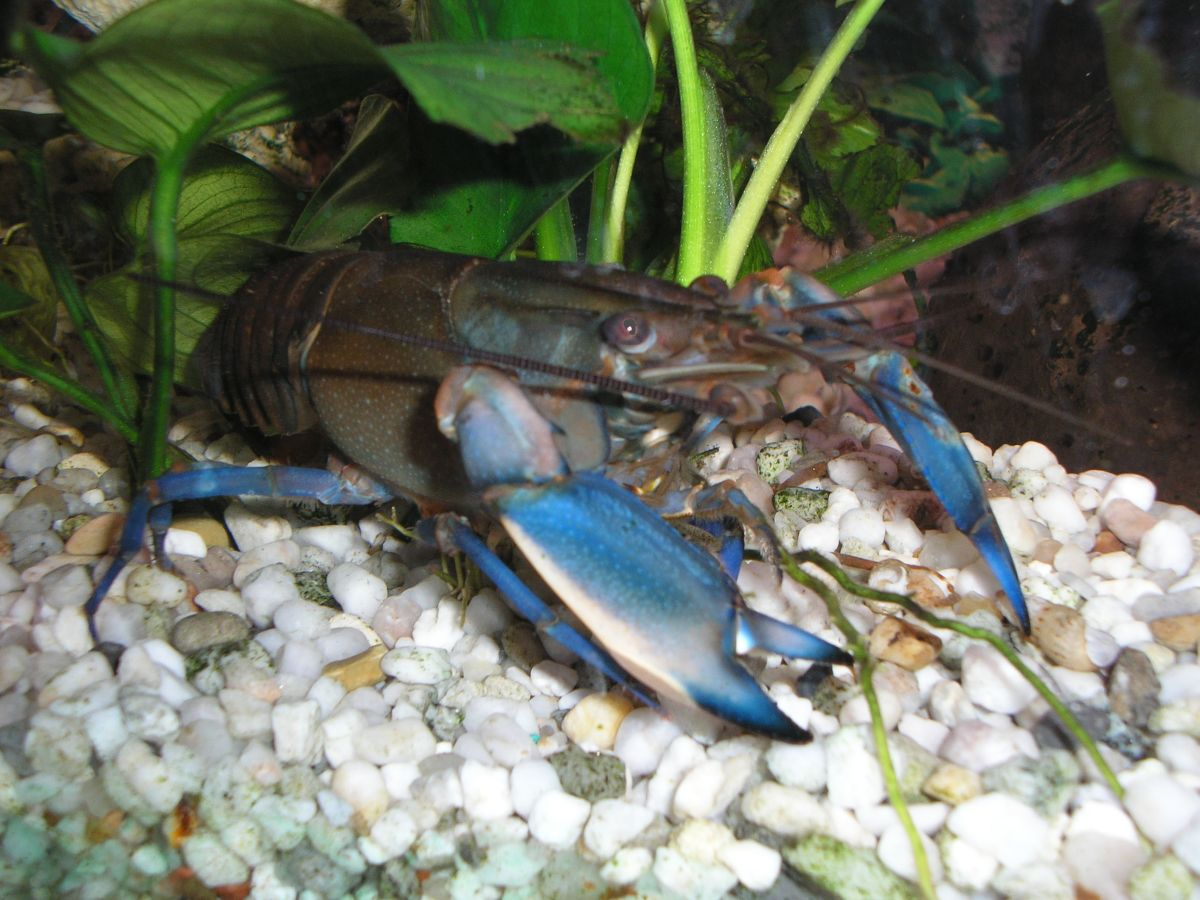
Cherax "Blue Moon" which could be C. boesemani or C. holthuisi

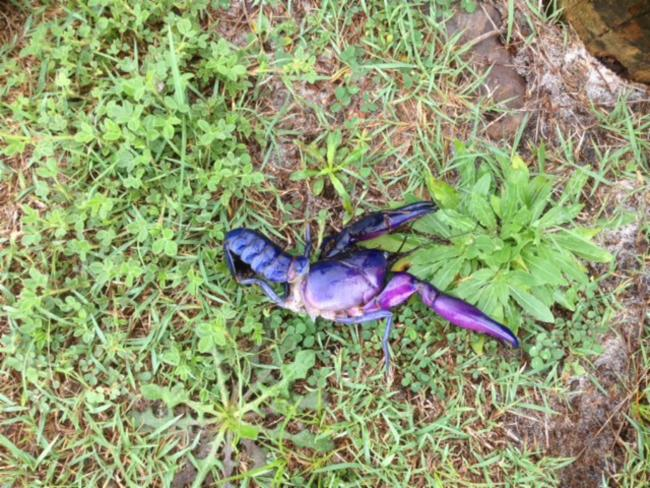
C. robustus

The genus contains at least 60 species:

- Cherax acherontis Patoka, Bláha & Kouba, 2017
- Cherax albertisii Nobili, 1899
- Cherax albidus Clarke, 1936
- Cherax alyciae Lukhaup, Eprilurahman & von Rintelen, 2018
- Cherax aruanus Roux, 1911
- Cherax austini Coughran & Hobson, 2012
- Cherax barretti Clark, 1941
- Cherax bicarinatus (Gray, 1845)
- Cherax boesemani Lukhaup & Pekny, 2008
- Cherax boschmai Holthuis, 1949
- Cherax buitendijkae Holthuis, 1949
- Cherax cainii Austin, 2002
- Cherax cairnsensis Riek, 1969
- Cherax cartalacoolah Short, 1993
- Cherax cid Coughran & Furse, 2012
- Cherax communis Holthuis, 1949
- Cherax crassimanus Riek, 1967
- Cherax cuspidatus Riek, 1969
- Cherax davisi Clark, 1941
- Cherax depressus Riek, 1951
- Cherax destructor Clark, 1936
- Cherax dispar Riek, 1951
- Cherax esculus Riek, 1956
- Cherax gherardii Patoka, Bláha & Kouba, 2015
- Cherax glaber Riek, 1967
- Cherax glabrimanus Riek, 1967
- Cherax gladstonensis Riek, 1969
- Cherax holthuisi Lukhaup & Pekny, 2006
- Cherax leckii Coughran, 2005
- Cherax longipes Holthuis, 1949
- Cherax lorentzi Roux, 1911
- Cherax minor Holthuis, 1996
- Cherax misolicus Holthuis, 1949
- Cherax monticola Holthuis, 1950
- Cherax murido Holthuis, 1949
- Cherax neocarinatus Riek, 1967
- Cherax neopunctatus Riek, 1969
- Cherax nucifraga Short, 1991
- Cherax pallidus Holthuis, 1949
- Cherax paniaicus Holthuis, 1949
- Cherax papuanus Holthuis, 1949
- Cherax parvus Short & Davie, 1993
- Cherax peknyi Lukhaup & Herbert, 2008
- Cherax plebejus (Hess, 1865)
- Cherax preissii (Erichson, 1846) syn. Cherax angustus McCulloch, 1914
- Cherax pulcher Lukhaup, 2015
- Cherax punctatus Clark, 1936
- Cherax quadricarinatus (von Martens, 1868)
- Cherax quinquecarinatus (Gray, 1845)
- Cherax rhynchotus Riek, 1951
- Cherax robustus Riek, 1951
- Cherax rotundus Clark, 1941
- Cherax setosus (Riek, 1951)
- Cherax snowden Lukhaup, Panteleit & Schrimpf, 2015 syn. Cherax subterigneus
- Cherax solus Holthuis, 1949
- Cherax tenuimanus (Smith, 1912)
- Cherax urospinosus Riek, 1969
- Cherax wagenknechtae /Lukhaup, Eprilurahman 2022
- Cherax wasselli Riek, 1969
- Cherax woworae Patoka, Akmal, Bláha & Kouba, 2023
- Cherax pulverulentus Patoka, Akmal, Bláha, & Kouba, 2025
