= Cherax woworae =

Steel blue crayfish

Scientific classification
- Domain: Eukaryota
- Kingdom: Animalia
- Phylum: Arthropoda
- Class: Malacostraca
- Order: Decapoda
- Suborder: Pleocyemata
- Family: Parastacidae
- Genus: Cherax
- Species: C. woworae

Binomial name
- Cherax woworae Patoka, Akmal, Bláha & Kouba, 2023

Species of crayfish

Cherax woworae, the steel blue crayfish, is a species of crayfish native to Southwest Papua, a province of Indonesia. The species is popular in the pet trade, in which it is sold under the name "blue moon crayfish". This has led to it becoming an introduced species in other countries, such as Hungary.

Despite being a popular species in aquariums, C. woworae was first described as a separate species in 2023. It is named after Daisy Wowor, a curator at the Bogor Zoology Museum in Java, Indonesia.
