= Cherax albidus =

Scientific classification
- Kingdom: Animalia
- Phylum: Arthropoda
- Clade: Pancrustacea
- Class: Malacostraca
- Order: Decapoda
- Suborder: Pleocyemata
- Family: Parastacidae
- Genus: Cherax
- Species: C. albidus

Binomial name
- Cherax albidus Clark, 1936
- Distribution of Cherax Albidus

Species of crayfish

Cherax albidus, commonly known as the white yabby or commercial yabby, is an Australian freshwater crayfish in the Parastacidae family, found primarily in Western Australian agricultural dams, creeks and other small bodies of water. It receives the name of the white yabby to distinguish it from Cherax destructor, the common or blue yabby.

Similar to the C. destructor, the white yabby shares its common name of yabby with many other Australian Cherax species of crustaceans.

== Description ==
Cherax albidus is known to grow over 13 cm (5 in) in length. Colour in C. albidus can vary according to a number of environmental and genetic factors; colours such as a beige or coffee colour, black, and even sapphire blue are common, with the latter being the rarest of the colours found.
