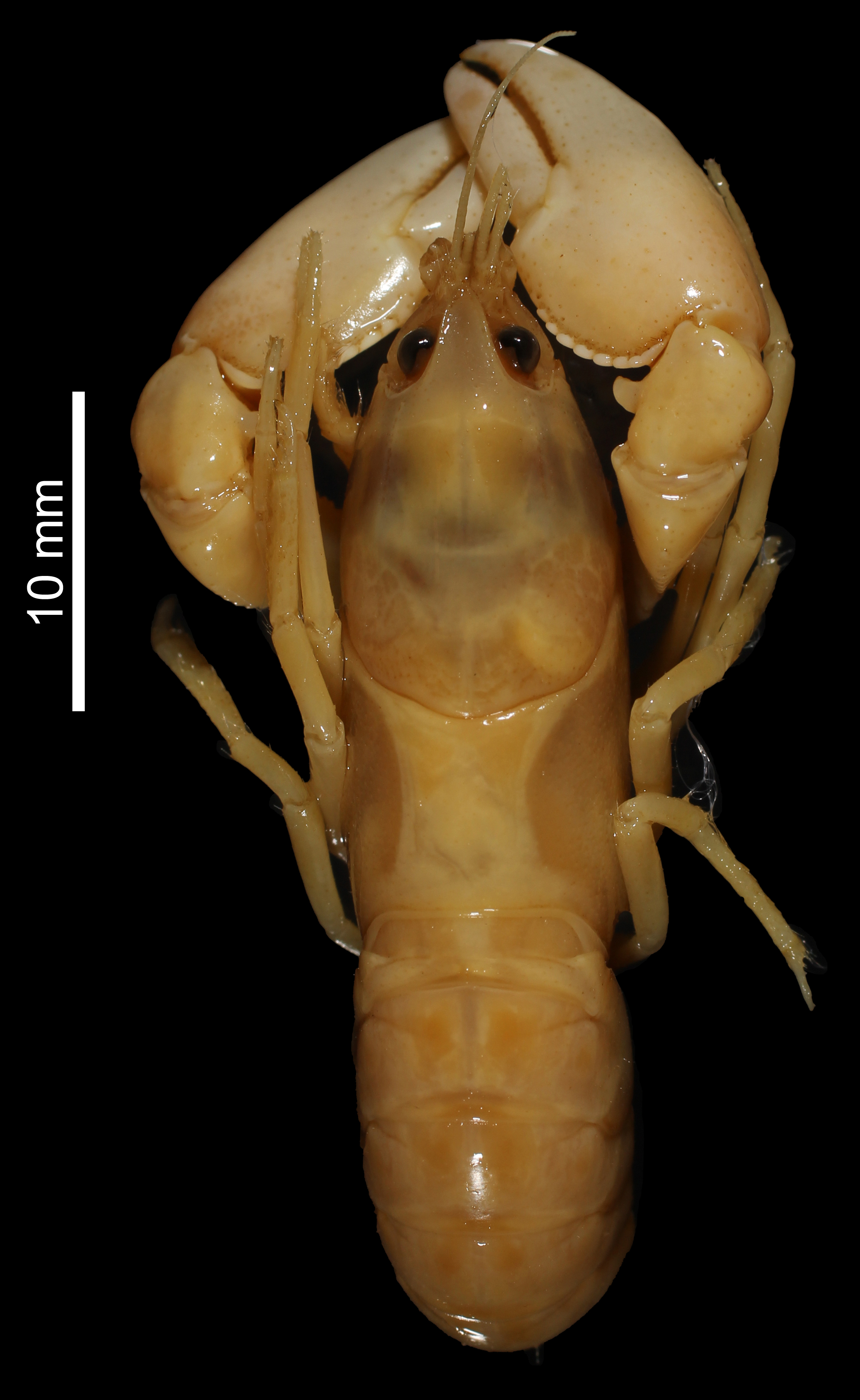

Conservation status
- Data Deficient (IUCN 2.3)

Scientific classification
- Kingdom: Animalia
- Phylum: Arthropoda
- Class: Malacostraca
- Order: Decapoda
- Suborder: Pleocyemata
- Family: Parastacidae
- Genus: Cherax
- Species: C. parvus

Binomial name
- Cherax parvus Short & Davey, 1993

= Cherax parvus =

Species of crayfish

Cherax parvus is a species of crayfish in the family Parastacidae. It is only known from its type locality – the Upper Tully River catchment in the Cardwell Range of north-eastern Queensland – and is listed as data deficient on the IUCN Red List. It was discovered in a rainforest catchment in a highland of northeastern Queensland during a Queensland Museum expedition to the upper Tully River area in November 1992. It is one of the smallest species in the genus. No species of Cherax has been considered endemic to wet upland or highland areas before it was discovered; most previous records were from elevations less than 400 meters. It also has several morphological features unique to the genus, and does not appear closely related to any extant species, suggesting a long period of geographic isolation.

== Anatomy of male holotype ==
=== Cephalothorax ===
The carapace (hard upper shell) is punctuated and slender, with a width of 0.5 to 0.6 mm and a depth of 0.5 to 0.6 mm. The cephalon (the head) has a few tubercles ventrally. The branchiostegites are uninflated, with a few tubercles along the ventral cervical groove. The rostrum (spinelike anterior median prolongation of the carapace) is slender and triangular, with a length of 1.0 to 1.6 mm. It is dorsally flattened and punctuated along the inner margins of the lateral carinae (narrow, longitudinal ridge extending along each side of carapace) and is smooth medially and bristly distally near the acumen (spine-like anterior median prolongation of the carapace). The lateral carinae are moderately developed, commencing at the base of the rostrum, terminating at the acumen, without tubercles or spines. The ventrolateral margins are bristly. The acumen is blunt and upturned.

The postorbital carinae are almost obsolete, unarmed anteriorly, excavated with well-separated punctations, commencing close to orbital margin of the carapace, medially curved anteriorly, and diverging posteriorly. The cervical groove is bristly. The branchiocardiac grooves are obsolete.

Its eyes are large, globular, and well-pigmented. The eyestalks are largely concealed by the rostrum. The scaphocerite (flattened plate or scale attached to the second joint of the antennae) length slightly exceeds the length of the rostrum, broadest at midlength. The lamina is broadly rounded at the middle, with the lateral margin terminating in a well-developed spine. The peduncles (stalks) of the antennae are bristly ventrally. The coxocerite (basal joint of antennae) is acute anteriorly. The basicerite (the second joint of antennae) has no lateral spine.

The epistome (plate in front of the mouth) is strongly concave at the middle and bristly anteriorly with distinct tubercles laterally. The mouthparts do not have unique features for the genus. The branchial formula is typical for the genus with the posterior arthrobranch (gill attached to the articular membrane between the body and the basal joint of a leg) above P4 reduced. Pleurocoxal (of the first segment of the leg) lappets are well-developed and are fringed with long, plumose setae (hair-like projections). The lappet between P4 and P5 is unusually thin and circular, with very long plumose setae.

The sternal keel (long ridge that runs lengthwise along the top of the head) is sharp posteriorly, more rounded anteriorly, and bristly laterally.

=== Chelipeds ===
The first chelipeds are large. The chela (claw) length exceeds the carapace length. The distal merus (fourth limb segment distally from body) reaches the end of the scaphocerite.

The outer margin of the chela is moderately convex. The fingers slightly gape and the opposing edges are dense with bristles ventrally as bristles on the pollex (movable joint of forceps) continue onto the manus (immovable finger and palm). It bears rounded teeth, with one tooth large and prominent on the dactylus (seventh and terminal segment of their thoracic appendages) at midlength, and a similar slightly smaller tooth on the pollex. The pollex is broad basally, evenly tapering. The dactylus is broadest at midlength and equal to the manus in length. The manus is moderately broad and its breadth is equal to its length. The dorsum is slightly convex longitudinally, strongly convex laterally, with teeth in the middle continuing onto the distal half.

The carpus (third segment from the distal end of the leg) bears a large, broad, hook-shaped mesial spine (missing on left cheliped). The angle of the distoventral or ventromesial condyle (a heavily sclerotized projection of the mandible's dorsal surface) is not produced into a spine or tubercle. A few tubercles are seen posteromesially. The distomesial angle is smooth. The distodorsal condyle is strongly developed and is enlarged laterally to form a broad, sclerotinous plate.

The merus (the upper arm) is of typical shape. The dorsal carina has no obvious tubercles or spines. The ventral surface is sparsely bristly.

== Color ==
The body is dark brown. The first chelipeds are dark brown distodorsally with reticulated pattern on the manus, orange at the fingertips, orange at proximal segments, and cream at the ventral manus and fingers. Second chelipeds and ambulatory legs are greenish-cream dorsally and light cream ventrally.

== Biology ==
This crayfish species lives in fresh water, short phreatic burrows under rocks, or amongst leaf litter in shallow, open water (1 m). It lives on rocks/sand or clay substrates on the edge of notophyll vine forests. It has a close association with rainforest. It lives at 720–750 m altitude. The waters it inhabits have zero to moderate flow and high clarity. The species can tolerate water with a pH around 5.5, a hardness less than 10 ppm, a temperature between 18 and 20°C, and levels of dissolved oxygen between 5.8 and 6.0 ppm.

Cherax parvus is sympatric with E. yigara, Caridina zebra, and an undescribed Macrobrachium sp.

== Distribution ==
This species is found in the upper Tully River and its tributary, O'Leary Creek; above Koombooloomba Dam, at 720–750 m altitude; and the Cardwell Range.

== Status ==
This species is probably secure. Although abundant at the type locality, more data are required on the distribution of the species and its relative abundance at other sites.

== Etymology ==
Latin (adjective), meaning small.

== Systematic position ==
Crayfish of the genus Cherax are distributed throughout the humid tropics of north Queensland. Although records of C. parvus lie within the broad geographical range of C. depressus, C. parvus does not appear closely related to that complex. The following unique features suggest a long period of geographic isolation:

1. The almost obsolete postorbital carinae commencing very close to the orbital carapace margin.
2. The distodorsal condyle on the campus of the first chelipeds is very strongly developed and enlarged laterally to form a broad, sclerotinous plate.
3. The pleurocoxal lappet between P4 and P5 is unusually thin, and fringed with very long, plumose setae.
4. The branchiostegites are uninflated in developed specimens.

With regard to the last character, inflated branchiostegisites and narrow areolae are generally correlated with the enlargement of the branchial chambers and increased surface area of gills. This is most pronounced in fully grown adults of species living in poorly oxygenated habitats. The relatively small branchial chambers of C. parvus may reflect its preference for cool, well-oxygenated, rainforest streams.

In contrast to the unarmed rostrum of C. parvus, all highland New Guinean species, except C. monticola, have two or more pairs of lateral processes (tubercles or spines) on the rostrum. C. parvus, however, has two well-defined uncalcified patches on the first cheliped of mature males and is clearly allied to the quadricarinatus species-group.
