= Cherax nucifraga =

Conservation status
- Data Deficient (IUCN 2.3)

Scientific classification
- Kingdom: Animalia
- Phylum: Arthropoda
- Class: Malacostraca
- Order: Decapoda
- Suborder: Pleocyemata
- Family: Parastacidae
- Genus: Cherax
- Species: C. nucifraga

Binomial name
- Cherax nucifraga Short, 1991

Species of crayfish

Cherax nucifraga is a species of crayfish in the family Parastacidae. It is known only from the type locality – Palm Springs, near Channel Point, Northern Territory, Australia – where the holotype was collected from the stomach of a barramundi. It is listed as data deficient on the IUCN Red List.

Its specific name derived from the Latin, nux (a nut) and frango (to break), which refers to the unusual form of the claws, which resemble nutcrackers.
