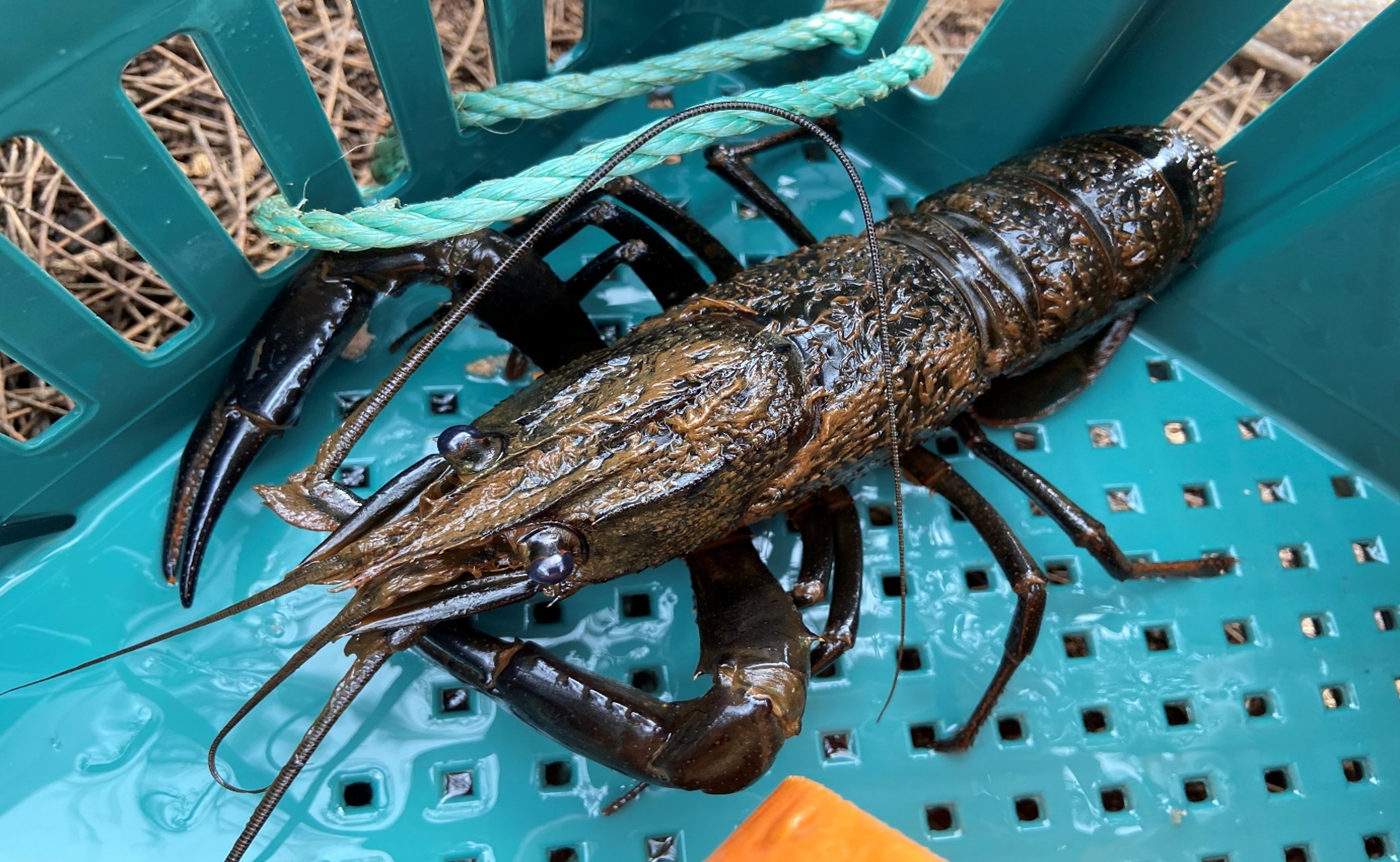

Conservation status
- Critically Endangered (IUCN 3.1)

Scientific classification
- Kingdom: Animalia
- Phylum: Arthropoda
- Class: Malacostraca
- Order: Decapoda
- Suborder: Pleocyemata
- Family: Parastacidae
- Genus: Cherax
- Species: C. tenuimanus

Binomial name
- Cherax tenuimanus (C. M. Austin, 1996)

= Cherax tenuimanus =

Species of crayfish

Cherax tenuimanus, known as the hairy marron or Margaret River marron, is one of two species of crayfish in Southwestern Australia known as marron. It occupies a narrow range within the southwestern biogeographical region of Margaret River. It is currently listed as critically endangered on the IUCN Red List, because of the threat from the smooth marron, Cherax cainii, which was introduced to its habitat.

Recent studies have shown that adding mannanoligosaccharide (Bio-Mos) to the diet of Cherax tenuimanus can increase their immunity and rate of survival.

== Description ==
The hairy marron ranges in colour from olive green to brown to black, with females sometimes having red or purple patches on their undersides. Adult hairy marrons grow to between 300 and 400 mm with a body consisting of a head and thorax that are protected by a carapace. The body eventually extends into an abdomen that ends in a muscular tail, and the body is bracketed by five pairs of legs including two pairs of pinchers; a larger pair for capturing prey and defense and a second, smaller pair for fine manipulation of food. The hairy marron can be differentiated from the smooth marron by the hairy bristles that are known to sometimes cover its carapace and other body parts, although these bristles can be difficult to observe in juveniles.

=== Diet ===
The hairy marron is an omnivore whose diet mainly consists of small invertebrates, fish eggs and larvae, and algae. It is also a cannibal that will potentially eat its own young.

== Habitat ==
The hairy marron lives in exclusively freshwater habitats, specifically in clear, oxygen-rich water in the Margaret River in Southwestern Australia. Its range has become limited to three major pools in the upper portion of the river due to competition with the smooth marron. Exact environmental parameters needed for the survival of the hairy marron are unknown due to the low number of individuals in natural settings. However, studies performed in aquaculture settings have shown that hairy marron survive best in water that is about 25 degrees Celsius and that with a salinity of at least 100 mg/L. They also prefer habitats with debris or other structures they can use as shelter or as food sources if the material is organic.

== Reproduction ==
Hairy marrons begin to mate when they reach sexual maturity during the second and third years of their lives, with their mating season occurring between July and October. During reproduction, the females typically incubate 200–400 eggs inside of them for almost six months, although larger females have been known to produce up to 800 eggs. The female then lays the eggs on her swimmerets, and reproduction takes place when a male passes a sperm packet to the female, which the female then uses to fertilize the eggs in a process nearly identical to that used by the smooth marron. The eggs are then held under the female's tail for several weeks, hatching at or just after the end of the mating season, and the juveniles remain on the mother's swimmerets until they have finished consuming their yolk sacs and are mature enough to feed on their own, which is usually by November or December. The smooth marron is known to follow a similar reproductive pattern, but there is some evidence that their breeding season occurs earlier in the year than that of the hairy marron. This difference in timing is theorized to result in the juvenile smooth marron reaching larger sizes before juvenile hairy marron, granting the smooth marron a competitive advantage.

== Invasion by smooth marron ==
One of the greatest threats to wild populations of hairy marron is invasion by the closely related smooth marron, which was introduced into the Margaret River in the 1980s, and which progressively replaced the hairy marron in the lower regions of the Margaret River from 1980 to 1992. Although the replacement of the hairy marron by the smooth marron in the middle portion of the river is not very well documented, the hairy marron was observed to be completely gone from the middle of the river in 2000. Beginning in the same year, smooth marron have always been observed living alongside all hairy marron populations in the upper portion of the Margaret River. Marron populations in the Margaret River follow the general trend of increasing in hairy marron and decreasing in smooth marron for regions further up the river. This trend has led scientists to conclude that smooth marron were most likely introduced in the lower portions of the river and spread to the middle and upper regions over time, replacing hairy marron through several processes including competition and hybridization.

=== Hybridization ===
The hairy marron and the smooth marron have been classified as two separate species in past studies based on their morphology and genetics. However, further research has found that smooth marron and hairy marron are able to interbreed and that interbreeding can produce reproductively viable hybrids. Debate as to whether the hairy marron and the smooth marron are the same or different species is currently ongoing within the scientific community. Even though interbreeding of the two species has been observed, it has been hypothesized that there is some sort of barrier between the two marrons that prevents them from interbreeding easily. This hypothesis is based on some research that suggests interbreeding is less frequent than it would be if the smooth marron and the hairy marron belong to the same species.

== Aquaculture and conservation ==
The aquaculture of hairy marron is a small-scale industry in Australia, which is also being utilized by the Australian Government to conduct a captive breeding program in an attempt to preserve the species. Efforts were also undertaken between 2013 and 2017 to regularly remove smooth marron from the few pools inhabited by hairy marron, but it was eventually decided that these fish outs were not having a pronounced enough effect to preserve wild populations. Conservation efforts have now turned toward expanding the captive breeding program and finding other sites where the captive marron could potentially be reintroduced to native water systems.
