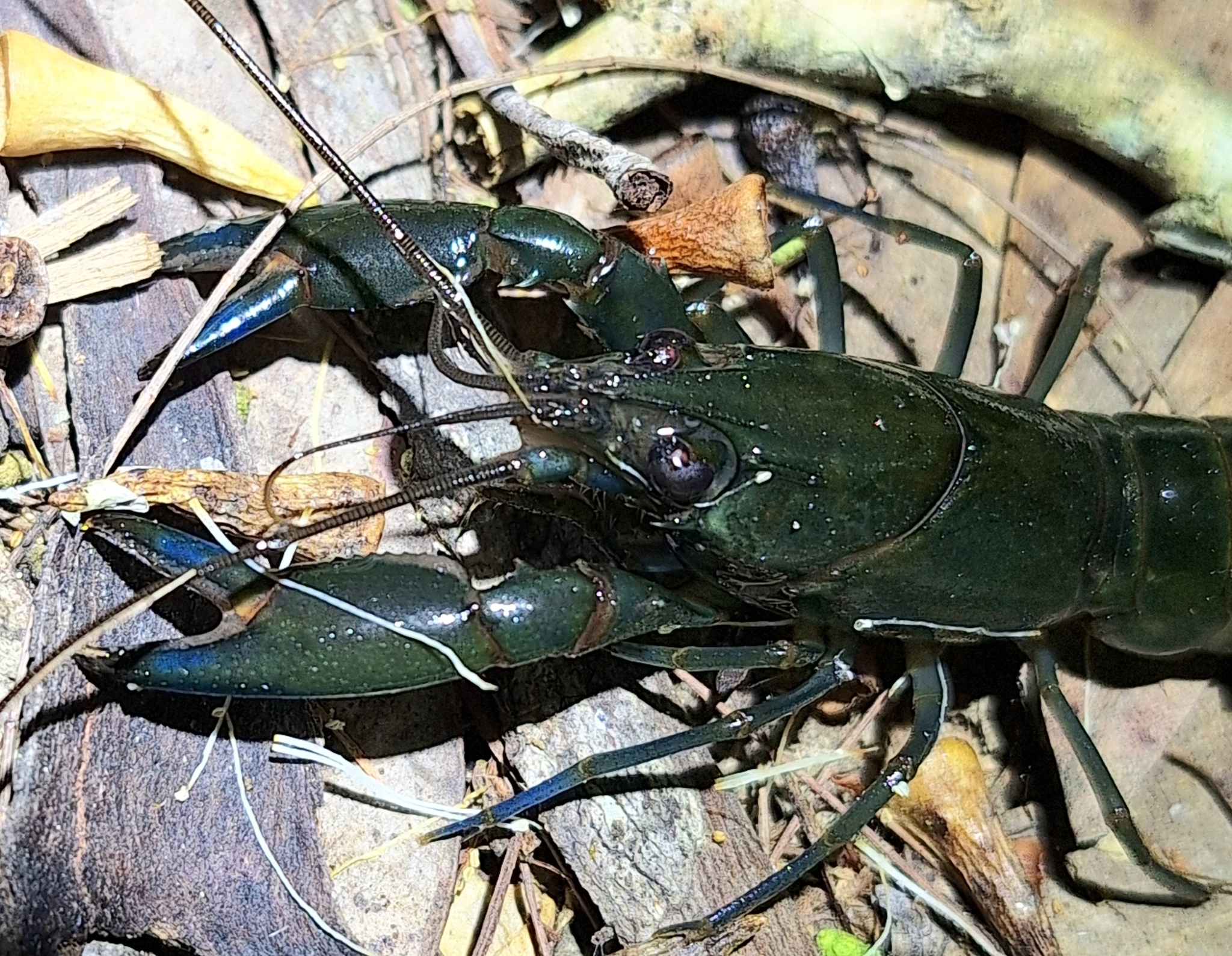
- A specimen in Larapinta, Queensland

Conservation status
- Least Concern (IUCN 3.1)

Scientific classification
- Kingdom: Animalia
- Phylum: Arthropoda
- Clade: Pancrustacea
- Class: Malacostraca
- Order: Decapoda
- Suborder: Pleocyemata
- Family: Parastacidae
- Genus: Cherax
- Species: C. dispar

Binomial name
- Cherax dispar Riek, 1951

= Cherax dispar =

Species of crayfish

Cherax dispar, the slender crayfish, is a species of parastacid crustacean found in eastern Australia.

== Taxonomy ==
Cherax dispar was discovered and scientifically described by Edgar F. Riek in 1951. Riek described the species based on not one but two thousand specimens; he gave the species' type locality as Moorooka, Queensland. The male holotype specimen, the female allotype, and several paratypes were then stored in the collections of the Australian Museum. Cherax dispar is colloquially known as the "slender crayfish".

In the same paper, Riek described two subspecies of Cherax dispar, which he called C. dispar elongatus and C. dispar crassus, also found in Queensland, with the holotypes and other specimens also being kept in the Australian Museum.

== Distribution ==
Cherax dispar was first collected from the Brisbane suburb of Moorooka, the Enoggera and Bulimba creeks, and the towns of Greenbank, Caloundra, and Cowan Cowan, on Moreton Island – all in southeastern Queensland. Since Riek's initial discovery, the crayfish have been found to inhabit an band along the coast of southeastern Queensland from near the Gold Coast north to Agnes Water. Their range does not extend more than 80 kilometres (50 mi) from the coastline; however, they have also been found on K'gari and North Stradbroke Island.

In his paper on the crayfish, Riek also provided the ranges of the two subspecies he described: C. dispar elongatus he reported from the lakes of K'gari, the type location being Lake McKenzie, while C. dispar crassus he described from Caboolture.

== Bibliography ==
- Riek, Edgar F. (1951-06-30). "The freshwater crayfish (family Parastacidae) of Queensland". Records of the Australian Museum. 22 (4): 368–388. doi:10.3853/j.0067-1975.22.1951.615. ISSN 0067-1975.
- Wilson, Robbie S.; Angilletta Jr., Michael J.; James, Rob S.; Navas, Carlos; Seebacher, Frank (2007). "Dishonest Signals of Strength in Male Slender Crayfish (Cherax dispar) during Agonistic Encounters". The American Naturalist. 170 (2): 284. doi:10.2307/4541081. ISSN 0003-0147.
