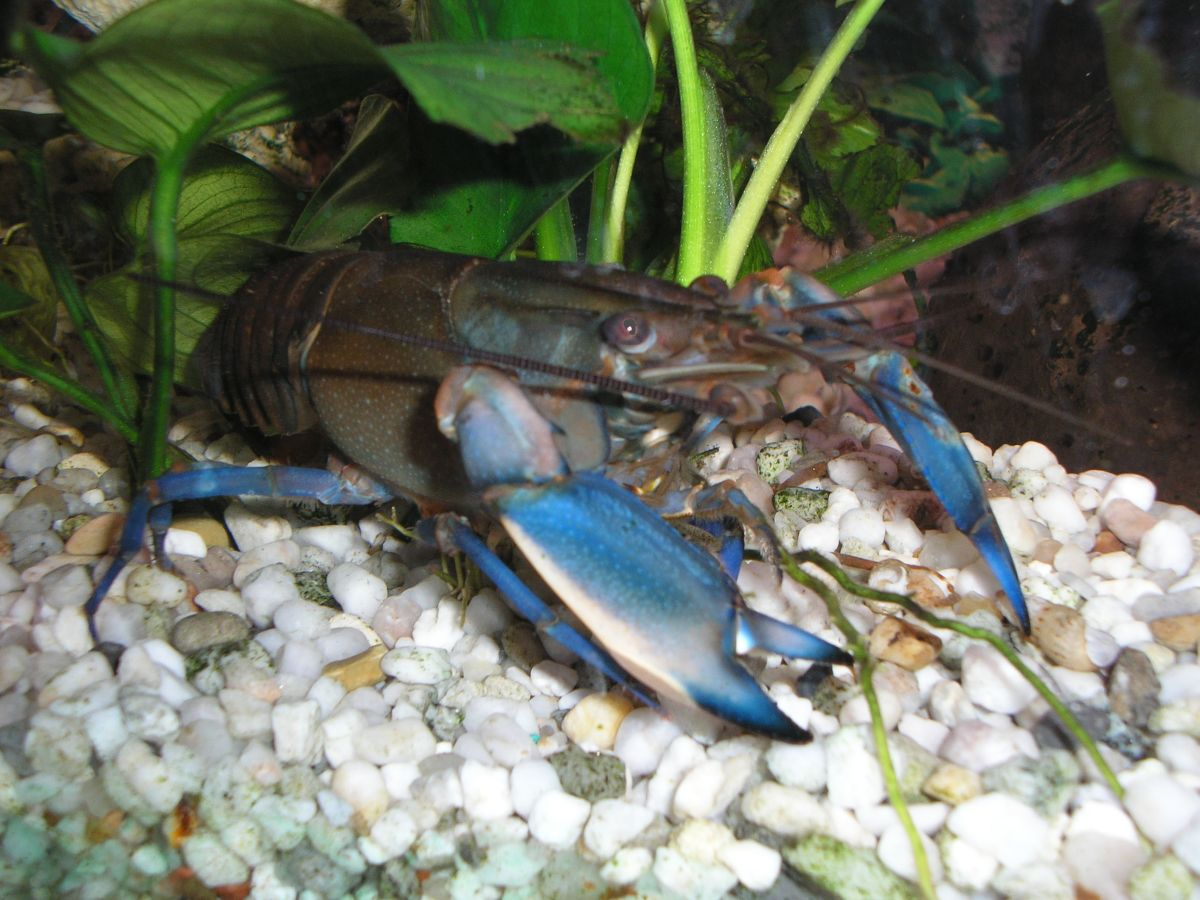

Conservation status
- Data Deficient (IUCN 3.1)

Scientific classification
- Kingdom: Animalia
- Phylum: Arthropoda
- Class: Malacostraca
- Order: Decapoda
- Suborder: Pleocyemata
- Family: Parastacidae
- Genus: Cherax
- Species: C. holthuisi

Binomial name
- Cherax holthuisi Lukhaup & Pekny, 2006

= Cherax holthuisi =

Species of crayfish

Cherax holthuisi is a species of crayfish from the Bird's Head Peninsula in New Guinea. It grows to a total length of 81–93 mm (3.2–3.7 in) and is typically pink, orange or yellow in wild specimens. It was described in 2006 after animals circulating in the aquarium trade could not be assigned to any known species.

== Description ==
The total length of Cherax holthuisi is 81–93 millimetres (3.2–3.7 in). In the wild, it is pink, orange or pale yellow, although blue varieties are also sold in the aquarium trade. It is chiefly differentiated from the other species in the genus Cherax by the form of the rostrum, the shape of the claws and the small size of its eyes. In C. holthuisi, the rostrum has two indentations on each side, and several indistinct lobes; in most other species, there are 3–8 teeth on the rostrum.

== Distribution and habitat ==
In the wild, Cherax holthuisi has only been recorded from Aitinjo Lake (1°25′28″S 132°22′22″E) on the Bird's Head Peninsula at the western end of New Guinea, in the Indonesian province of West Papua. The lake is 4 kilometres (2.5 mi) long and up to 350 metres (1,150 ft) wide, and is surrounded by steep mountains. C. holthuisi has been listed as Data Deficient on the IUCN Red List, pending better knowledge of its biology.

== Taxonomy ==
Specimens of Cherax holthuisi were collected in 1952, when M. Boeseman bought nine individuals from locals on the shores of Lake Aitinjo. They were deposited in the Rijksmuseum van Natuurlijke Historie (now part of Naturalis) as lots RMNH D 51503 and RMNH D 51504. The species remained undescribed, however, until Christian Lukhaup and Reinhard Pekny attempted to identify some exotic crayfish then on the market in Germany. Their specimens did not accord with any of the nine species described from New Guinea by Lipke Holthuis, but did match Boeseman's undescribed specimens. Lukhaup and Pekny therefore described the new species in a 2006 publication in Zoologische Mededelingen and called it Cherax holthuisi in honour of Lipke Holthuis. One juvenile was later discovered among specimens described as the new species Cherax boesemani in 2008.
