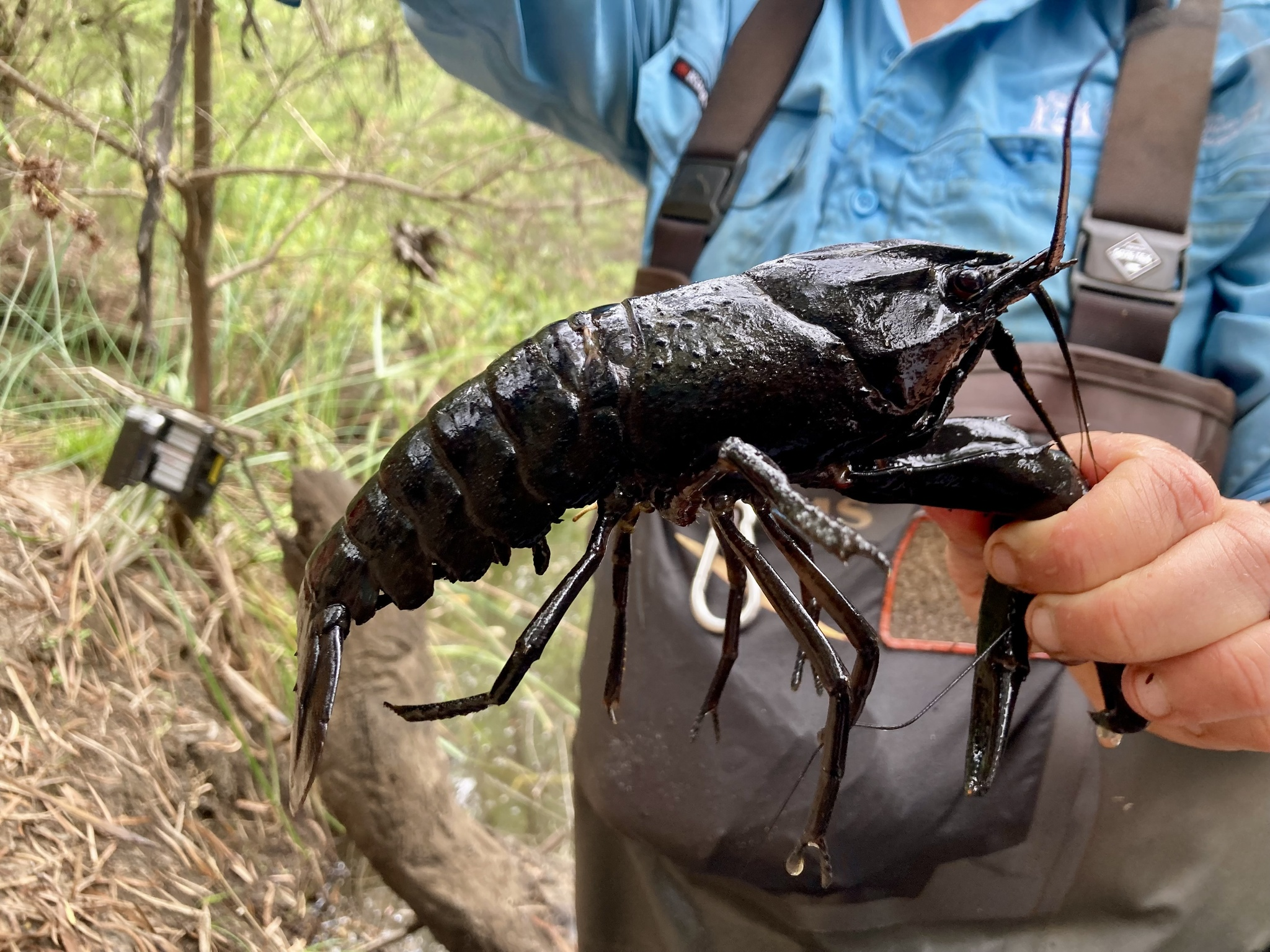

Conservation status
- Least Concern (IUCN 3.1)

Scientific classification
- Kingdom: Animalia
- Phylum: Arthropoda
- Class: Malacostraca
- Order: Decapoda
- Suborder: Pleocyemata
- Family: Parastacidae
- Genus: Cherax
- Species: C. cainii

Binomial name
- Cherax cainii Austin and Ryan 2002

= Cherax cainii =

Species of crayfish

Cherax cainii, known as the smooth marron, is one of two species of crayfish that are endemic in Southwestern Australia known as marron. Growing to over 380mm in length , it occupies a range extending from around Hutt River in the north west to around Esperance in the south east of Western Australia. The species is also now found in variety of artificial and natural fresh water bodies of Queensland, South Australia, Victoria and New South Wales in Australia. It has also been introduced to other countries including North America, Chile, South Africa, Zambia, Japan and New Zealand as a part of commercial aquaculture schemes.
