= Marron =

Species of crayfish

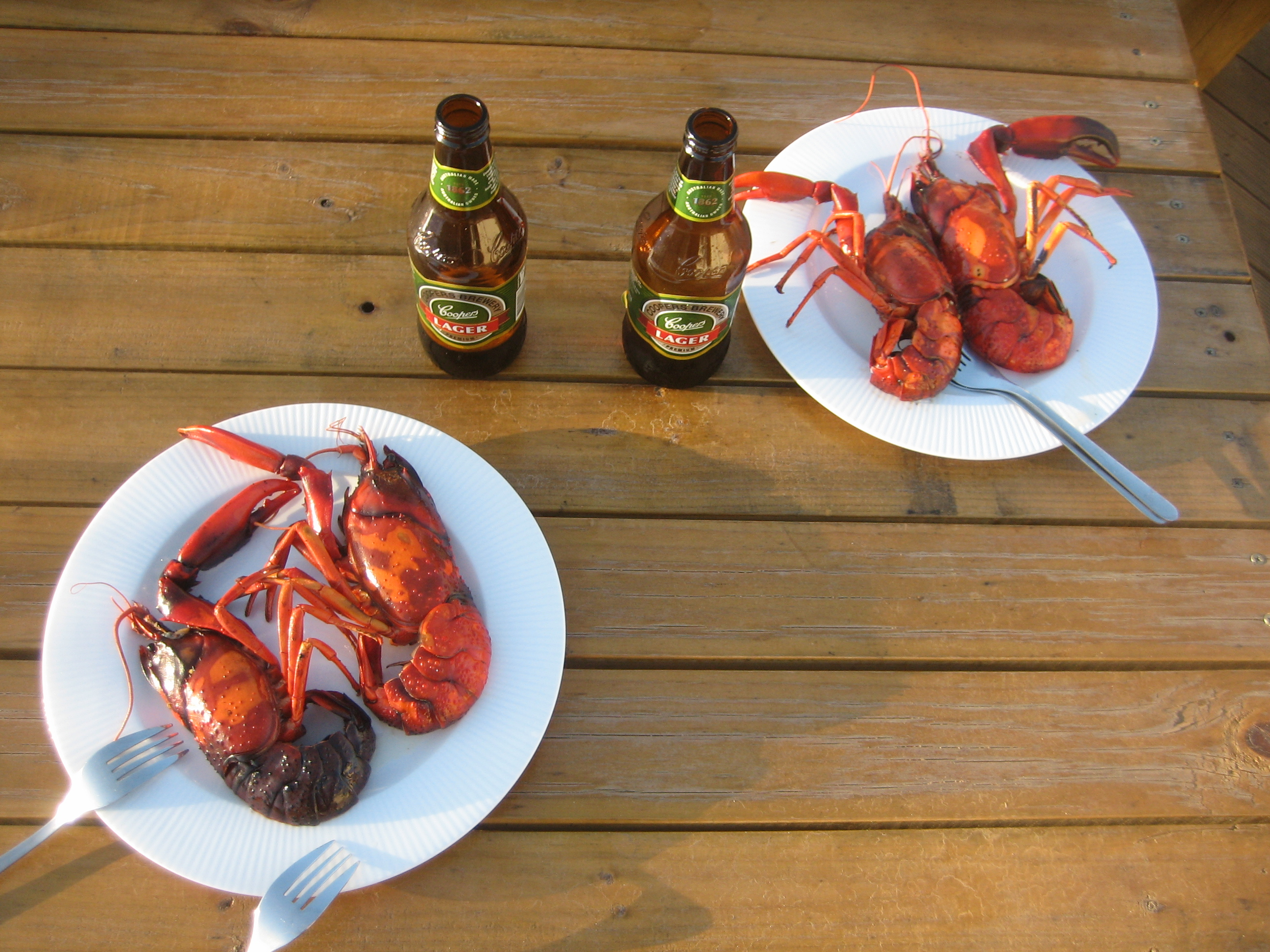
Grilled marron, ready to eat

Marron is a name given to two closely related species of crayfish in Western Australia. Formerly considered a single species, it is since recognised as comprising two species, the critically endangered Cherax tenuimanus, and the species that is outcompeting it, C. cainii.

Marron are considered a luxury product and are the subject of a developing aquaculture industry in Western Australia and other Australian states. Total Australian production of farmed marron was 30 tons in 1996. In Western Australia, recreational fishing for marron is tightly controlled, with a limited season, permits are required, and minimum sizes are enforced.

Marron have been introduced to Kangaroo Island in South Australia, where they have been commercially farmed, and have established feral populations in local waterways. In New Zealand, permits were formerly granted for commercial farming of marron until at least the early 1990s. Since then it has been illegal to import into or grow in New Zealand, and 500 specimens discovered growing in an illegal operation in South Kaipara were destroyed in 2005.
