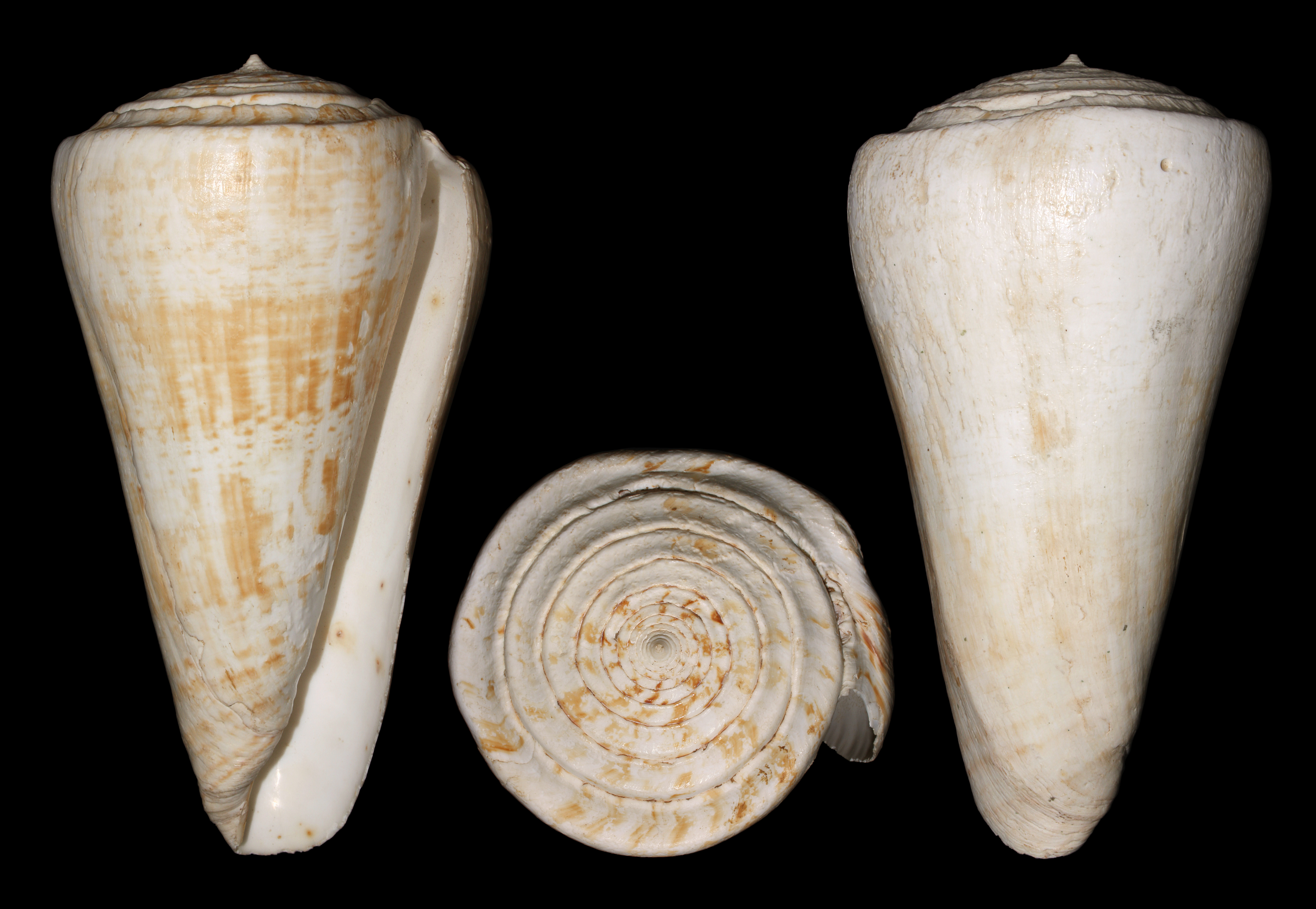
- A shell of Conus pulcher

Conservation status
- Least Concern (IUCN 3.1)

Scientific classification
- Kingdom: Animalia
- Phylum: Mollusca
- Class: Gastropoda
- Subclass: Caenogastropoda
- Order: Neogastropoda
- Superfamily: Conoidea
- Family: Conidae
- Genus: Conus
- Species: C. pulcher

Binomial name
- Conus pulcher [[[John Lightfoot (biologist)|Lightfoot]]], 1786

Synonyms
- Conus (Kalloconus) pulcher [Lightfoot], 1786 accepted, alternate representation; Conus archithalassius Link, 1807; Conus bicolor G. B. Sowerby I, 1833 (May) (invalid: junior homonym of Conus bicolor G.B. Sowerby I, 1833 [March]); Conus breviculus G. B. Sowerby II, 1833; Conus fluctifer Dillwyn, 1817; Conus grandis G. B. Sowerby I, 1823; Conus leoninus Gmelin, 1791 (invalid: junior homonym of Conus leoninus [Lightfoot], 1786); Conus nicolii Wilson, 1831; Conus papilionaceus Hwass in Bruguière, 1792; Conus papillaris G. B. Sowerby I, 1833; Conus prometheus Hwass in Bruguière, 1792; Conus pulcher pulcher [Lightfoot], 1786; Cucullus achatinus Röding, 1798 (nomen dubium); Cucullus indiae Röding, 1798; Kalloconus pulcher ([Lightfoot], 1786); Kalloconus pulcher pulcher ([Lightfoot], 1786)

= Conus pulcher =

Species of sea snail

Conus pulcher, common name the butterfly cone, is a species of sea snail, a marine gastropod mollusk in the family Conidae, the cone snails and their allies.

Like all species within the genus Conus, these snails are predatory and venomous. They are capable of stinging humans, therefore live ones should be handled carefully or not at all.

There is one subspecies : Conus pulcher siamensis Hwass in Bruguière, 1792

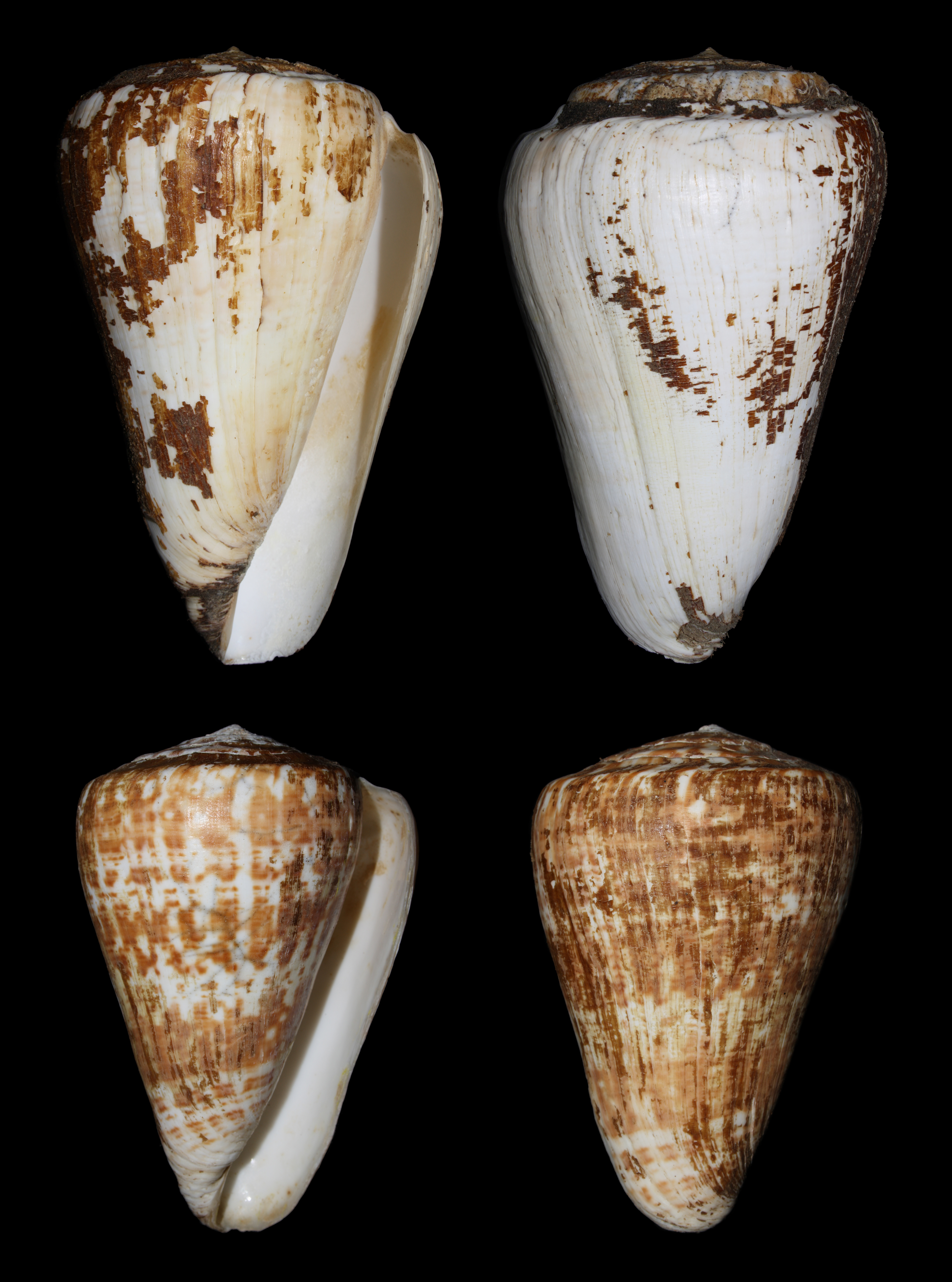
A Shell of albinistic and of regular colour, both with periostracum.

According to Bernard, experts do not agree on the identity of this cone and therefore it seemed better to separate it into two varieties, according to their habitat. Bernard thus mentions two Conus pulcher varieties: C. pulcher f. papilionaceus (Lightfoot, 1786) and C. pulcher f. prometheus (Lightfoot, 1786)

== Description ==
The size of the shell varies between 40 mm and 260 mm. This is the largest of the cone snails. The shell is narrow and rather thin. It is longitudinally finally striate. The acuminate spire is sulcate. The color of the shell is variable white to cream, variegated with numerous lines of short dashes and spots of light to darker chestnut.

== Distribution ==
This species occurs in the Eastern Atlantic Ocean off (Guinea, Senegal, Angola)
