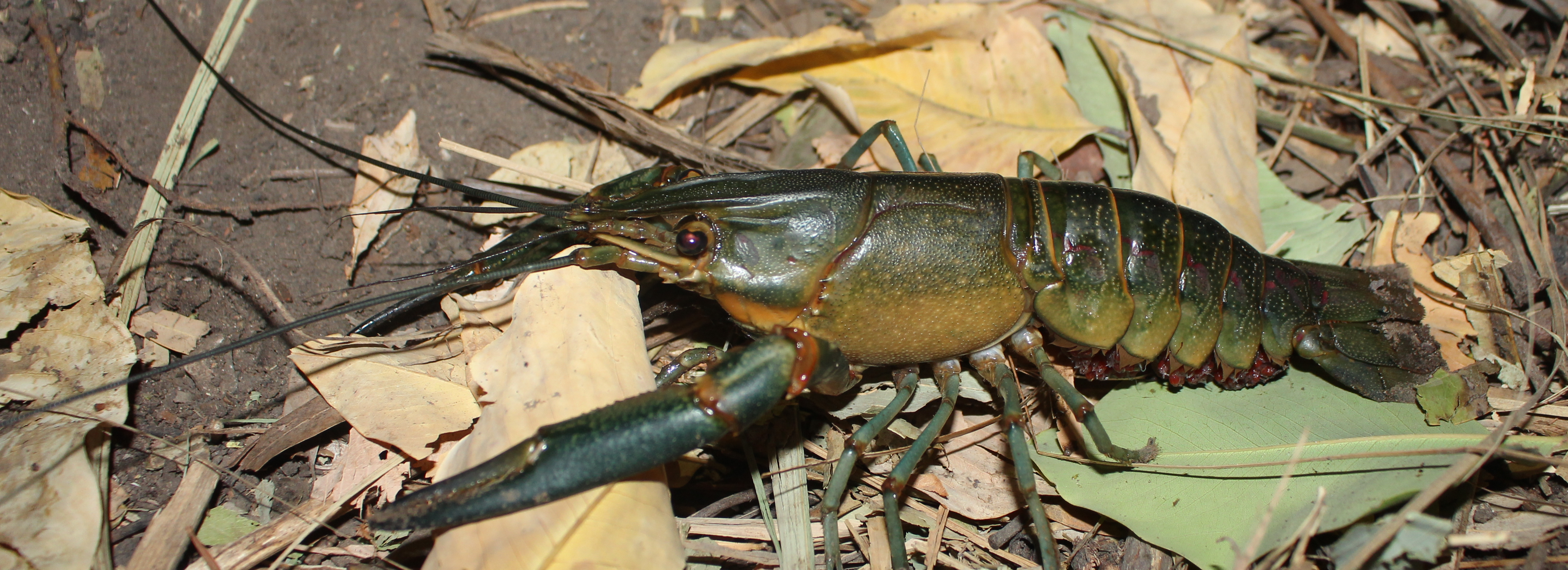

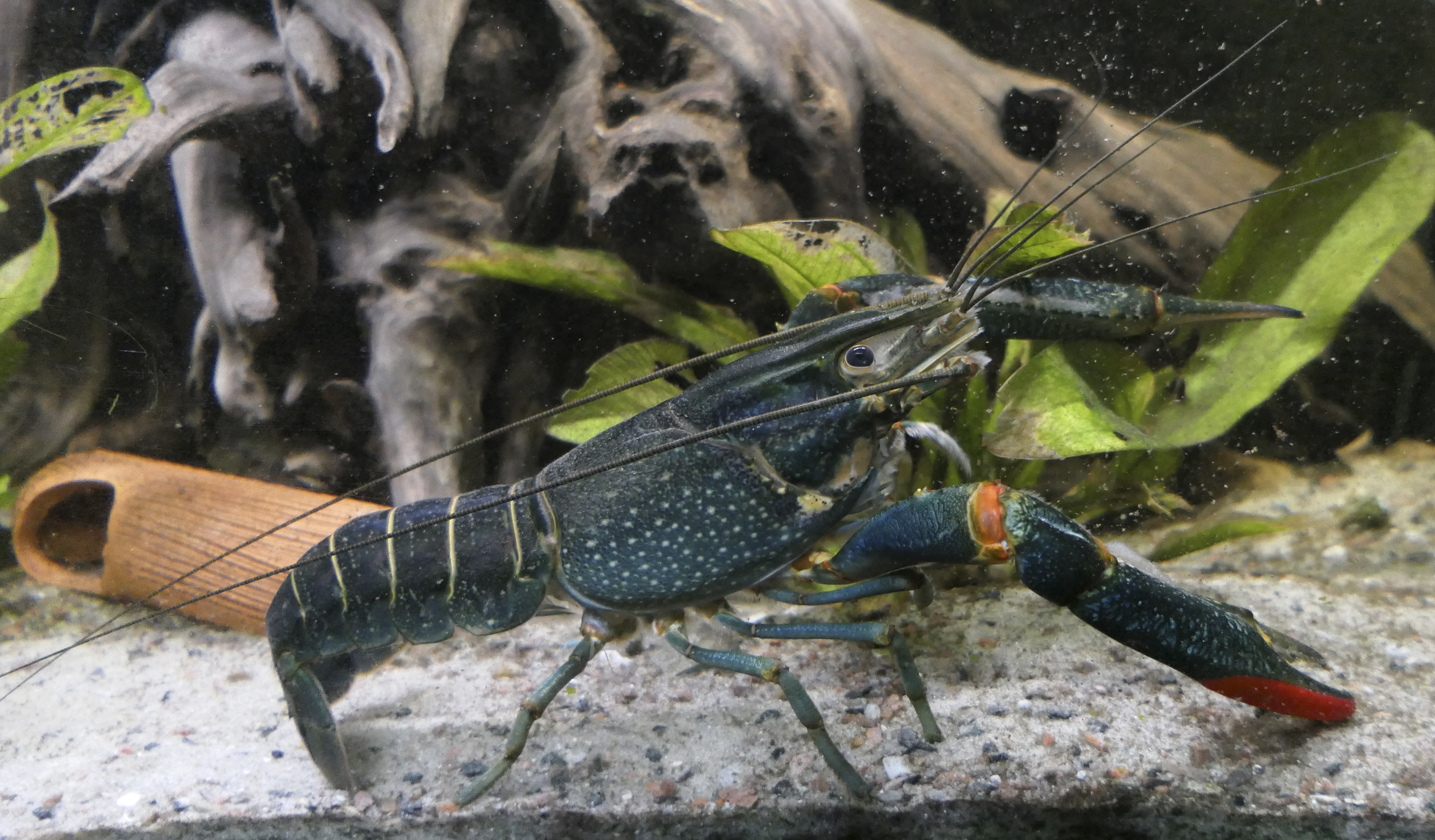
- Typical wild form (above) and aquarium form (below)

Conservation status
- Least Concern (IUCN 3.1)

Scientific classification
- Kingdom: Animalia
- Phylum: Arthropoda
- Clade: Pancrustacea
- Class: Malacostraca
- Order: Decapoda
- Suborder: Pleocyemata
- Family: Parastacidae
- Genus: Cherax
- Species: C. quadricarinatus

Binomial name
- Cherax quadricarinatus (Von Martens, 1868)

= Cherax quadricarinatus =

Species of crayfish

Cherax quadricarinatués (known by several common names, including Australian red claw crayfish, Queensland red claw, red claw yabby, redclaw, tropical blue crayfish, freshwater blueclaw crayfish) is an Australian freshwater crayfish.

== Distribution and ecology ==
C. quadricarinatus is native to permanent freshwater streams, billabongs and lakes on the north coast of the Northern Territory, northeastern Queensland, and Papua New Guinea. Through translocation by humans, the range has spread down to southern Queensland and into the far north of Western Australia, where it is outcompeting the local crayfish species . C. quadricarinatus is considered an invasive species, and has established feral populations in South Africa, Mexico, Jamaica, Puerto Rico, Indonesia, Zambia, Malaysia and Singapore.

This tropical crustacean is very tolerant of environmental changes, and is primarily a detritivore.

== Description ==
The colour of C. quadricarinatus ranges from dark brown to blue-green. Their heads have four keels (as implied by the epithet), and adult males have a distinct red patch on the outer margin of the claws. They can reach up to 30 cm (12 in) and 600 grams (21 oz).

== Life cycle ==
Females, which are smaller than males, spawn 300–800 olive-green eggs per brood, which are fertilised from a spermatophore which the male has deposited at the base of her walking legs (pereiopods) during mating. Fertilised eggs are affixed to the female's pleopods, situated on the underside of the tail. Incubation takes approximately six weeks and the newly hatched juveniles rapidly become independent.

== Aquaculture ==
C. quadricarinatus is often kept in aquariums worldwide, and is the only species of crayfish that can be kept in indoor aquaria for ornamental use in the UK (except Scotland) without a licence.

It is farmed commercially in Queensland and the Northern Territory, and is harvested at between 35–130 grams (1.2–4.6 oz). C. quadricarinatus is a sought-after product with a delicate crustacean flavour. They are both non-aggressive in nature as well as highly fertile, and can therefore be bred in large numbers in captivity. Time to sexual maturity, and therefore harvest size, is somewhere between six and twelve months in optimally farmed conditions.
