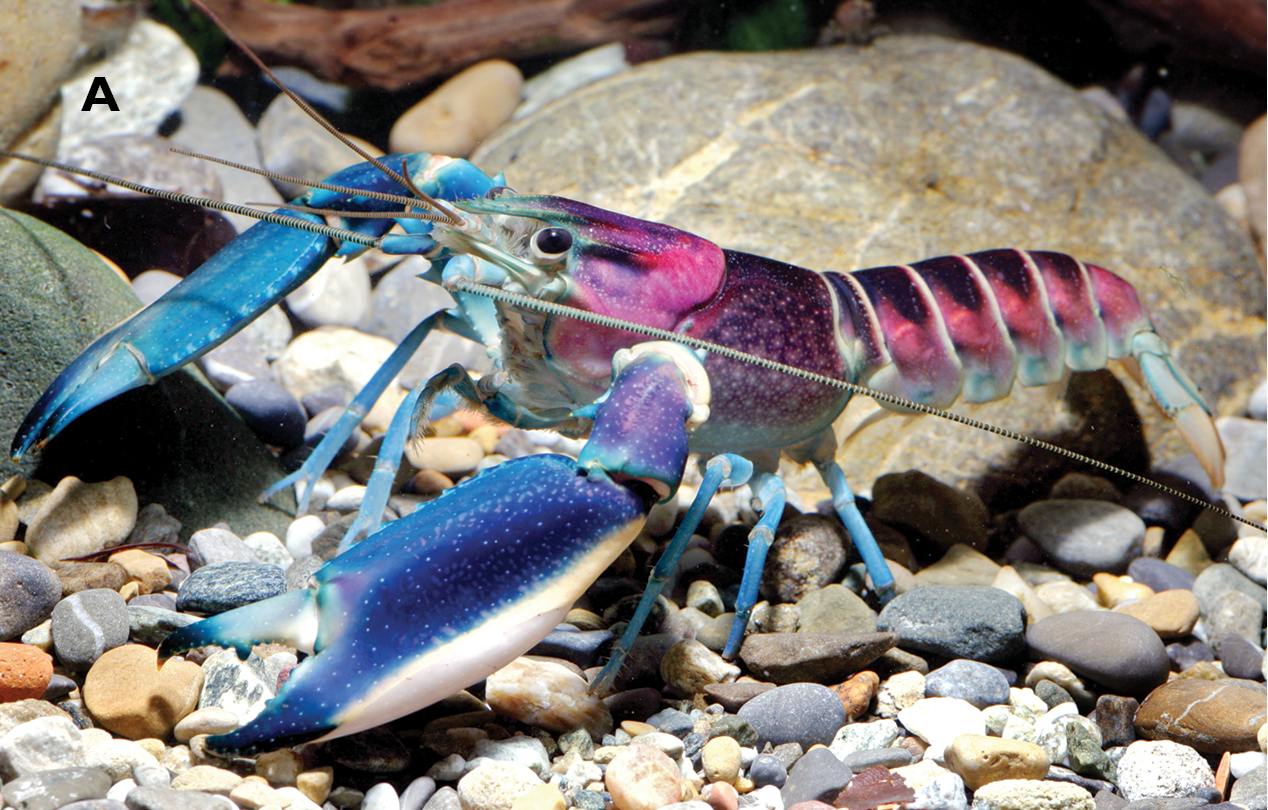

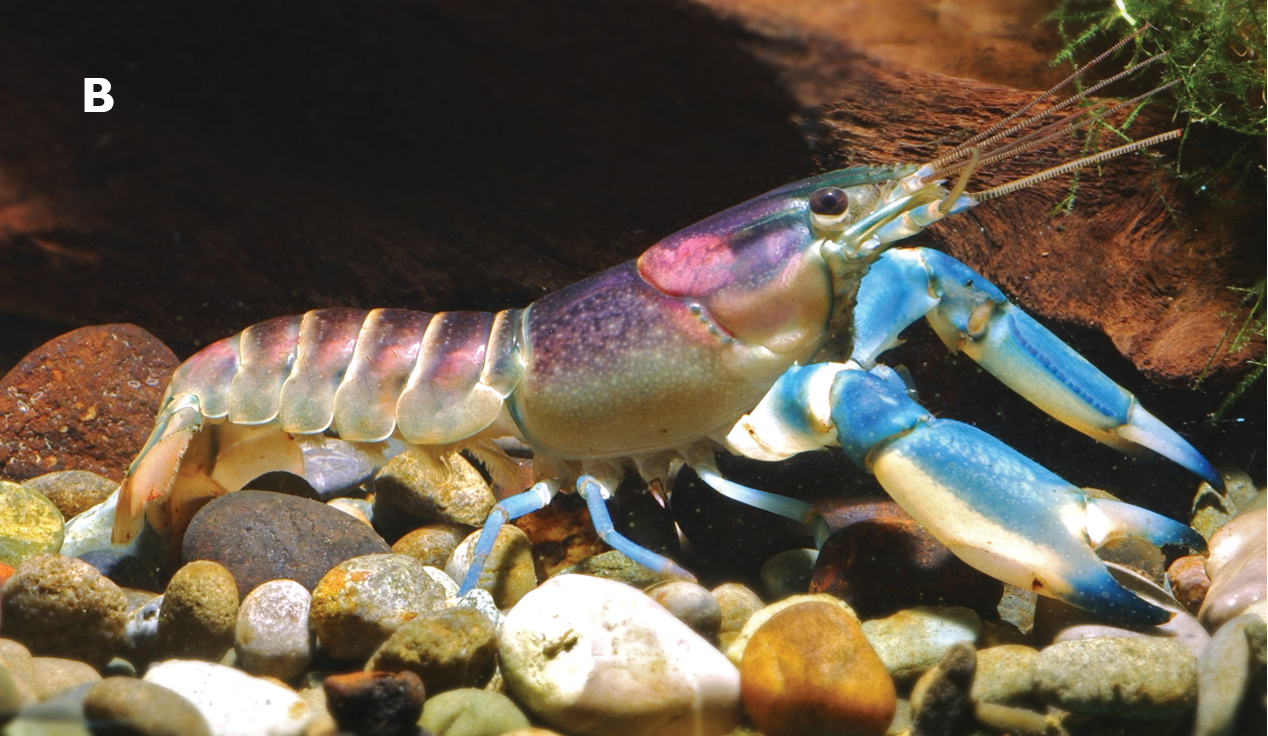
- Mature (top) and immature (bottom) males of C. pulcher.

Scientific classification
- Kingdom: Animalia
- Phylum: Arthropoda
- Clade: Pancrustacea
- Class: Malacostraca
- Order: Decapoda
- Suborder: Pleocyemata
- Family: Parastacidae
- Genus: Cherax
- Species: C. pulcher

Binomial name
- Cherax pulcher Lukhaup, 2015

= Cherax pulcher =

Species of crayfish

Cherax pulcher is a species of crayfish from West Papua in Indonesia. It is popular as a freshwater aquarium species across Asia, Europe, and North America.

== Etymology ==
The specific name is derived from the Latin word pulcher, which means "beautiful". The name was chosen due to the species' bright coloration.

== Discovery ==
The species was first observed being sold for aquariums, where it was ascertained that it likely represented a new species. However, it proved difficult to track down, as dealers' claims as to its location proved difficult to corroborate. It was eventually traced to the Bird's Head Peninsula in New Guinea, where a number of specimens were collected with the help of the Maju Aquarium in Jakarta.

== Description ==
Males of the species measure 75–98 millimetres (3.0–3.9 in) in length, while females measure 83–90 millimetres (3.3–3.5 in) long. The body is slightly oval in shape. The species has notably large eyes.

The species is brightly colored, with a pink cephalothorax that fades into greenish-grey on the sides. The rostrum is a greenish-blue, and the pleon is dark blue or black, with pinkish-grey or cream coloration on the margins (in some individuals the pleon is greenish-grey with pink speckles). The tail fan is cream-colored or pink around the outside margin. The legs are blue, and the chelae are blue with varying intensities, with cream-colored or white margins.

== Taxonomy ==
Cherax pulcher is part of the subgenus Astaconephrops. It is the nineteenth Cherax species to have been discovered in West Papua in Indonesia (Cherax are not known from other Indonesian regions). The most morphologically similar species, C. boesemani, is found in the Ajamaru Lake and the Ajamaru River, approximately 22 kilometres (14 mi) away.

== Range and habitat ==
As of 2015 the species was only found in Hoa Creek near the village of Teminabuan in West Papua, Indonesia. The creek is clear, fast flowing in some places, with a sandy and rocky bottom.

== Human use ==
The species is sold throughout Asia, Europe, and North America on the ornamental fish market, where it is commonly marketed under the names "Hoa Creek", "Blue Moon", or "Irian Jaya". Local people also harvest it as a source of food.

== Conservation status ==
Due to continued harvesting of the species both for export and for consumption, it has been observed by local collectors that the species' numbers have begun to decrease.
