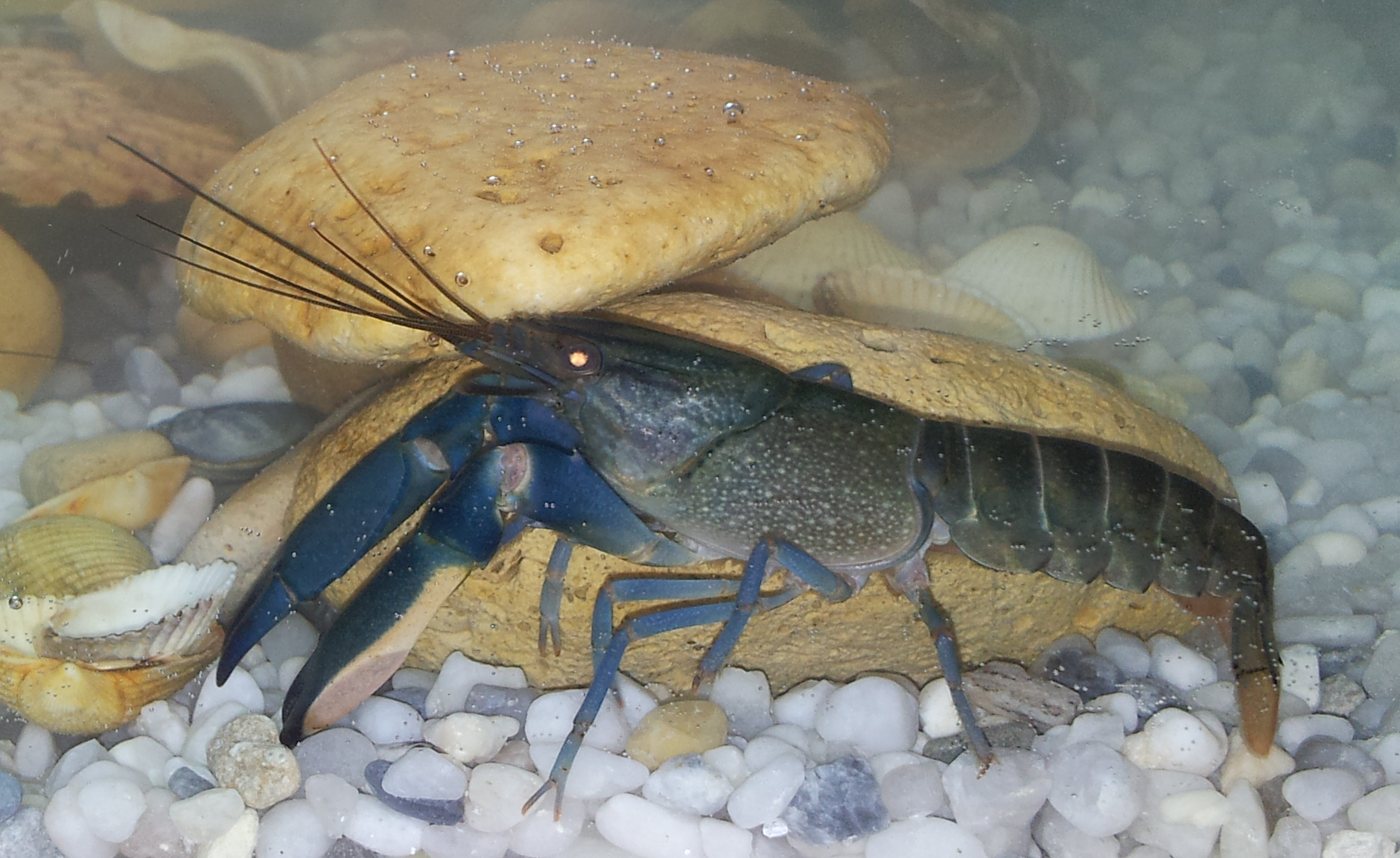

Conservation status
- Data Deficient (IUCN 3.1)

Scientific classification
- Kingdom: Animalia
- Phylum: Arthropoda
- Class: Malacostraca
- Order: Decapoda
- Suborder: Pleocyemata
- Family: Parastacidae
- Genus: Cherax
- Species: C. boesemani

Binomial name
- Cherax boesemani Lukhaup & Peckny, 2008

= Cherax boesemani =

Species of crayfish

Cherax boesemani is a species of crayfish from West Papua in Indonesia (Ajamaru Lakes and the Ajamaru River, which belong to the Kais River drainage and Kepala Burung or Vogelkop Peninsulas). It is popular as a freshwater aquarium pet across Asia, Europe, and North America.

Cherax boesemani is a relatively large crayfish, adult body length is 5–6 in (13–15 cm). Variable blues, reds, and oranges are the predominant carapace colours, which has led to extensive selective breeding to create new commercial strains, with names such as Blue Moon, Supernova, Papuan red, tricolor and Red Brick. Hybrids with C. pulcher commercially known as Thunderbolt Blue Moon are also available.
