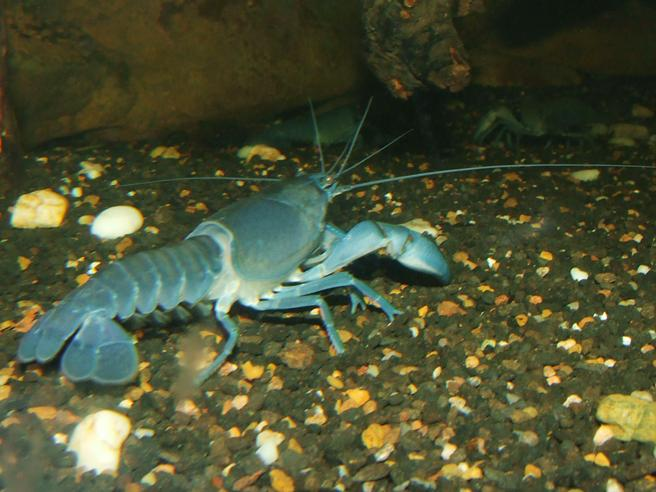

Conservation status
- Vulnerable (IUCN 2.3)

Scientific classification
- Kingdom: Animalia
- Phylum: Arthropoda
- Clade: Pancrustacea
- Class: Malacostraca
- Order: Decapoda
- Suborder: Pleocyemata
- Family: Parastacidae
- Genus: Cherax
- Species: C. destructor

Binomial name
- Cherax destructor (Clark, 1936)

= Common yabby =

Species of crayfish

The common yabby (Cherax destructor) is an Australian freshwater crustacean in the Parastacidae family. It is listed as a vulnerable species of crayfish by the International Union for Conservation of Nature (IUCN), though the wild yabby populations remain strong, and have expanded into new habitats created by reservoirs and farm dams.

Other names frequently used for Cherax destructor include the blue yabby or cyan yabby. Its common name of "yabby" is also applied to many other Australian Cherax species of crustacean (as well as to marine ghost shrimp of the infraorder Thalassinidea).

== Taxonomy ==
During a wet season, an Australian yabby can travel kilometers across land in search of new water in which to make its home.

The word "yabby" comes from yabidj which was the term for freshwater crayfish in several Aboriginal Australian languages that were spoken in what is now known as Victoria, including the Wemba Wemba language and the Woiwurrung–Taungurung language.

== Physical description ==
Yabbies are on average 10–20 cm (4–8 in) in length, but have been shown to grow to lengths of up to 30 cm (12 in).

The common yabby has a smooth shell with one pair of post-orbital ridges. It does not have a spine on the shoulders behind the cervical groove (region that separates head from thorax). Females have a reduced growth rate after maturity which usually means that they are smaller in size compared to their male counterparts

Colour is highly variable and depends on water clarity and habitat; yabbies can range from black, blue-black, or dark brown in clear waters to light brown, green-brown, or beige in turbid waters. Yabbies specifically bred to be a vibrant blue colour are now popular in the aquarium trade in Australia.

== Dissemination ==
Yabbies are common in Victoria and New South Wales, although the species also occurs in southern Queensland, South Australia, and throughout parts of the Northern Territory, making it the most widespread Australian crayfish. It has been introduced to Western Australia, where it is an invasive species and poses a threat to other Cherax crayfish species native to the region, such as gilgies (Cherax quinquecarinatus). It is also occasionally introduced to Tasmania, where due to the island state's fragile ecosystem it's also considered an invasive species.

The common yabby has the largest distribution of any freshwater species currently in Australia as it lives within the inland river systems of both central and eastern Australia, which extends over nearly the entire continent.

Due to its widespread abundance and ability to become an invasive species, yabbies can survive in a large range of climates from warm tropics to the cool and temperate plains and highlands. They also are found in a variety of freshwater environments, including both turbid water holes and clear permanent flowing streams and lakes. With its varied dissemination and limited movement, there are also often morphological changes between different populations of common yabbies as well.

Yabbies are found in swamps, streams, rivers, reservoirs, and farm dams at low to medium elevations. Yabbies apparently were largely restricted to lower-altitude habitats in inland areas of south-eastern Australia including the Murray-Darling Basin before European settlement, with the Euastacus spiny crayfish species found in higher-altitude habitats and the coastal river systems. High-altitude yabby populations in Lakes Eucumbene and Jindabyne, on the upper reaches of the coastal Snowy River system, are unusual and may be translocated.

Yabbies are found in many ephemeral waterways, and can survive dry conditions for several years by lying dormant in burrows sunk deep into muddy creek and swamp beds.

Yabbies are primarily nocturnal detritivores, feeding primarily on algae and plant remains at night, but also opportunistically feeding on any fish or animal remains they encounter at any time of day.

In Southern Australia, it is commonly accepted that yabbies are active and thereby available to catch during the warmer months. (Colloquially, any month with the letter "R" in it.) When temperatures fall below 16 °C (61 °F), they enter a state of reduced metabolic activity, or "partial hibernation".

Yabbies are an important dietary item for Australian native freshwater fish such as Murray cod and golden perch.

== Behaviour ==
=== Sensory systems ===
Yabbies are largely active at night, living in underwater burrows and in turbid waters as a protective measure from predators. In addition, the turbid environments in which many yabbies live severely reduce the amount of light that reaches the bottom and consequently reduces the value of visual sensory systems. As a result, they often utilize nonvisual cues to navigate their environment while scavenging for food like plants and other arthropods. Tactile clues are often utilized by yabbies through their antennas, allowing them to create a spatial configuration of the world around them during the night and in visually clouded environments while maintaining the ability to obtain food and retreat to their shelter when threatened.

Yabbies have 2 pairs of antennas which they use to sense their environment through tactile and chemical methods. The first pair of antennas are smaller and are located near the top of the head, inside the larger secondary antenna pair. This first pair plays a larger role in the detection and interpretation of chemical stimuli within the environment, allowing yabbies to detect and respond to chemical signals dissolved in the water. These signals can correspond with food sources, predators, or conspecifics and can be detected over short distances. The second, larger pair of antennas are long and flexible and contain mechanoreceptors that use physical touch to allow the yabby to receive information about the distance to, size, and shape of nearby objects. By constantly exploring their environment, yabbies use these mechanoreceptors to gradually map out their surroundings in combination with their chemoreceptors used to detect food, predators, or mates. Similar sensory systems that utilize both mechanoreception and chemical sensing have also been observed in other freshwater crayfish species including the Australian freshwater crayfish Euastacus Spinifer.

Yabbies actively explore their environment and continuously use their antennas to obtain information from their environment, allowing them to create a spatial representation of their surroundings even without the ability to see clearly. Experimental studies have shown that, using their spatial configurations of the environment created by tactile information, yabbies learn and memorize their environment to avoid obstacles more efficiently using prior exposure and new stimuli in combination. They have also been known to demonstrate flexible behaviours and adaptive problem-solving when encountering unfamiliar terrain, showing a great ability for error correction and reconstruction of their spatial maps.

=== Acoustic systems ===
Cherax Destructor can produce acoustic signals through the generation of high-peak and low-peak frequency impulses. The sources of some of these signals are still unclear but are believed to originate internally from yabbies and not from their extremities like other arthropod species. It is hypothesized that sound emission comes from some organ that is internal or ventral and is not used for movement, as even resting yabbies can produce these acoustic signals. Other decapod crustaceans, such as lobsters, often utilize tail flips or movement of the scaphognathite up and down, but neither were found to be associated with vibrations produced by Cherax Destructor.

These auditory signals are often used to communicate with conspecifics about mating, grouping, and other communication. According to studies, yabbies have also been known to emit these sonic signals in response to receiving another chemical or acoustic signal. In the dark and turbid waters which these animals live in, the usage of these acoustic signals is extremely vital for effective communication that circumvents the limited light that penetrates past the surface of the water. It is still currently being studied what each signal communicates but it has been shown that these sounds are not consistently tied to specific behaviours.

Although high-frequency vibrations tend to be emitted less frequently, the rate of low and high-peak frequency signals depends on various factors. Grouped yabbies tend to produce fewer low-frequency sounds and more high-frequency sounds than lone yabbies. Additionally, these signals tend to increase in production when in closer proximity to each other. Single males also tend to emit more low-frequency signals than single females, indicating a role in sexual attraction and mating behaviours. This is not the case for high-frequency signals which tend to be similar in frequency between males and females. Studies have also hypothesized that males tend to rely on fighting more often than indirect signals and so females utilize acoustic signals to avoid conflict more often than males.

== Food ==
=== Feeding behaviour ===
Yabbies, are largely nocturnal, and mostly feed during periods of low light like at dusk or dawn. Due to the low-light levels of many of the habitats in which they live in, yabbies often utilize nonvisual sensory systems to detect and capture live prey. Some of these sensory systems include chemoreception and tactile senses.

Due to an ability to extract organic nutrients efficiently from many different food sources, yabbies often use a non-selective approach to obtaining prey as juveniles, being carnivores, herbivores, and detritivores.

Using coordinated movement of their legs and mouths, yabbies forage for many types of food efficiently. Among many other prey, Zooplankton is one of the common yabby’s most common sources of food. Yabbies are known to be able to distinguish between live and dead zooplankton and also change their feeding behaviour depending on their size.

Experimental studies show that in smaller Yabbies (less than 15g), feeding behaviour often follows a rapid probing and searching with the first two pairs of walking legs and then rapidly moving it towards its mouth. Larger yabbies (greater than 25g) tend to use their walking legs less to grasp the zooplankton and instead use their legs to push the zooplankton towards their mouths without searching or probing, instead using more manipulation and sweeping motions. Larger yabbies also tend to capture more zooplankton than smaller yabbies by using these feeding behaviours.

=== Diet ===
Yabbies consume a large variety of different food and are able to extract organic matter from their environment in a plethora of different ways. Being opportunistic polytrophic omnivores, yabbies primarily feed on plant, animal, and detrital material all depending on the environment in which they live in and their stage of development. When grown in controlled environments, however, they can also consume artificial, nonliving foods as well. As juveniles less than 15 mm in length, they are most equipped to consume detritus and less preferentially zooplankton. Studies also show that yabbies better utilize nutrients by grazing on small organisms that attach to synthetic substrates as juveniles and reduce this behaviour as they grow up.

Some examples of natural food in which yabbies can extract nutrients from include detrital forage, soil benthos, soil substrate, and peron. Like some other freshwater crayfish, yabbies can ingest in bulk and selectively process organic nutrients to feed themselves.

Artificial substrates are often commonly used to culture juvenile yabbies under controlled conditions. For use in studies and culture, research shows that the usage of high protein pellets alongside conditioned synthetic material yielded the fastest growth for yabbies during intensive nursery phase production.

== Development ==
=== Growth environment ===
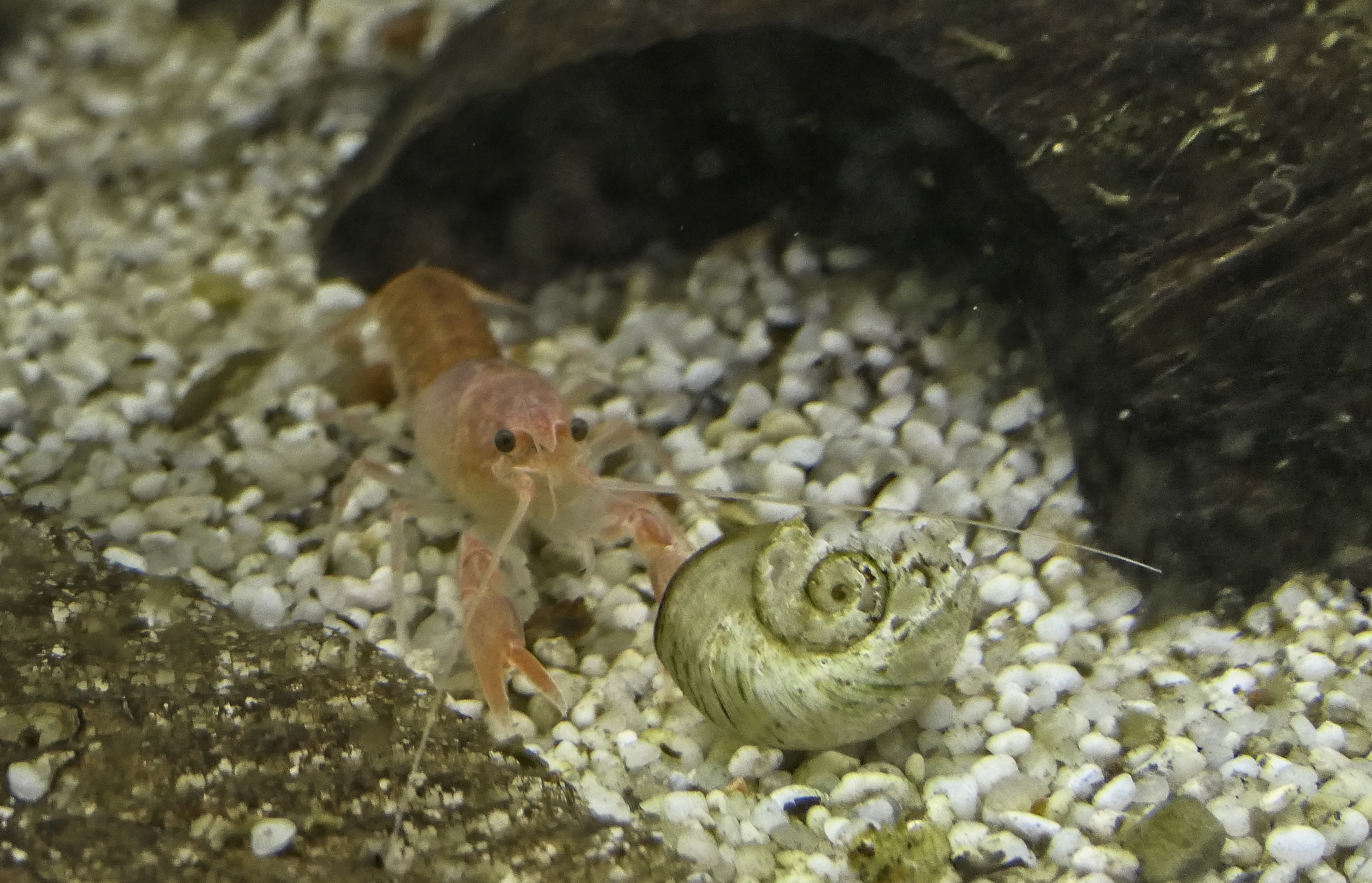
Juvenile Cherax Destructor

Being an ectothermic and rather social species, both temperatures and density display a tremendous effect on the growth rate and survival of juvenile yabbies in the wild. Research has shown juvenile yabbies grow most rapidly with increasing temperature in a range around 22-28 C. However, the density of the yabby population also plays a large role in the effect of temperature. Increasing density, despite not significantly impacting survivability itself, resulted in an decrease in survival at higher temperatures. Higher densities of crayfish also contribute to increased intraspecies aggression and lower weight, most likely due to increased competition and lack of resources. Experimental results indicate the optimal temperature and weight to be around 25 C and 600 m^{−2}.

However, further studies have shown a mechanism of response in Cherax Destructor that allows them to be more tolerant to low-temperature environments and contribute to their strong adaptability to survive in various climates through Australia. Although weight gain, length gain, and molting rates all decreased when temperature was lowered, research shows activity of antioxidant enzymes, pathways against endocrine disorders, glucose metabolism, antioxidant defense, and immune responses were upregulated to compensate for and protect against diminished environmental temperatures. As a result, the ability of yabbies to adapt to even low-temperature environments is increased through these mechanisms to further their ability to act as an invasive species in a variety of different locations.

=== Environmental stressors ===
Environmental stressors affecting the common yabby include chemical pollutants such as neonicotinoids, a type of pesticide, which significantly impact physiological and behavioral functions. Even acute exposure can impair neurological function and behaviours due to changes made to the nervous system. Some disruptions include lowered feeding efficacy, worse avoidance of predators, reduced overall fitness, and other narcotic-like effects which can lead to worsening fitness. In-depth studies have also shown that accumulation of neonicotinoids can lead to a build-up of reactive oxygen species (ROS) and reduced activity of antioxidants, leading to significant cell damage over time.

=== Life and reproduction ===
Clutch size, brood size, development rate, and other reproductive factors of yabbies vary significantly depending on both genetic and non-genetic factors. Studies have shown that some phenotypic factors, such as female body weight, were positively correlated with clutch and brood size although brood sizes were often lower than clutch sizes. In addition, environmental factors like temperature were negatively correlated with developmental time which ranged from 33.4 to 42.2 days, indicating a faster rate of development at higher temperatures within a certain range. However, these results also showed large variability even within the same species Cherax Destructor.

== Invasive Species ==
Non-indigenous crayfish have been documented to be among some of the most successful animal taxa at the expense of freshwater biodiversity and Cherax destructor is no exception. Cherax destructor was introduced for aquaculture in Australia and in Europe outside its native habitat and is predicted to grow extremely rapidly due to its aggressive behavior and ability to utilize a wide variety of resources. In addition, there is strong evidence that they can adapt to a wider range of environments by successfully overwintering in temperate Europe through its superior burrowing abilities. While no conclusive data comparisons have been made, the Australian common yabby is also reported to be successful against other invasive species of the same genus.

In the European Union, it is included in the list of invasive alien species of Union concern and hence cannot be imported, bred, transported, commercialized, or intentionally released into the environment in any of its member states.

== Catching ==
Catching yabbies, or "yabbying", in rivers and farm dams is a popular summertime activity in Australia, particularly with children. The most popular method involves tying a piece of meat to a few metres of string or fishing line, which in turn is fastened to a stick in the bank, and throwing the meat into the water. The string is pulled tight when a determined yabby grasps the meat in its claws and tries to make off with it. The line is then slowly pulled back to the bank, with the grasping yabby usually maintaining its hold on the meat. When the meat and the grasping yabby reaches the water's edge, a net is used to quickly scoop up both the meat and the grasping yabby in one movement.

Other methods of catching yabbies involve various types of nets and traps. Local fishing regulations must be checked before using any nets and traps for yabbies; many types of nets and traps are banned or restricted, as wildlife such as platypus, water rats, and long-necked turtles can become trapped in them and drown. Yabbying is also a term used in southern New Zealand for catching Paranephrops zealandicus.

== Aquaculture ==
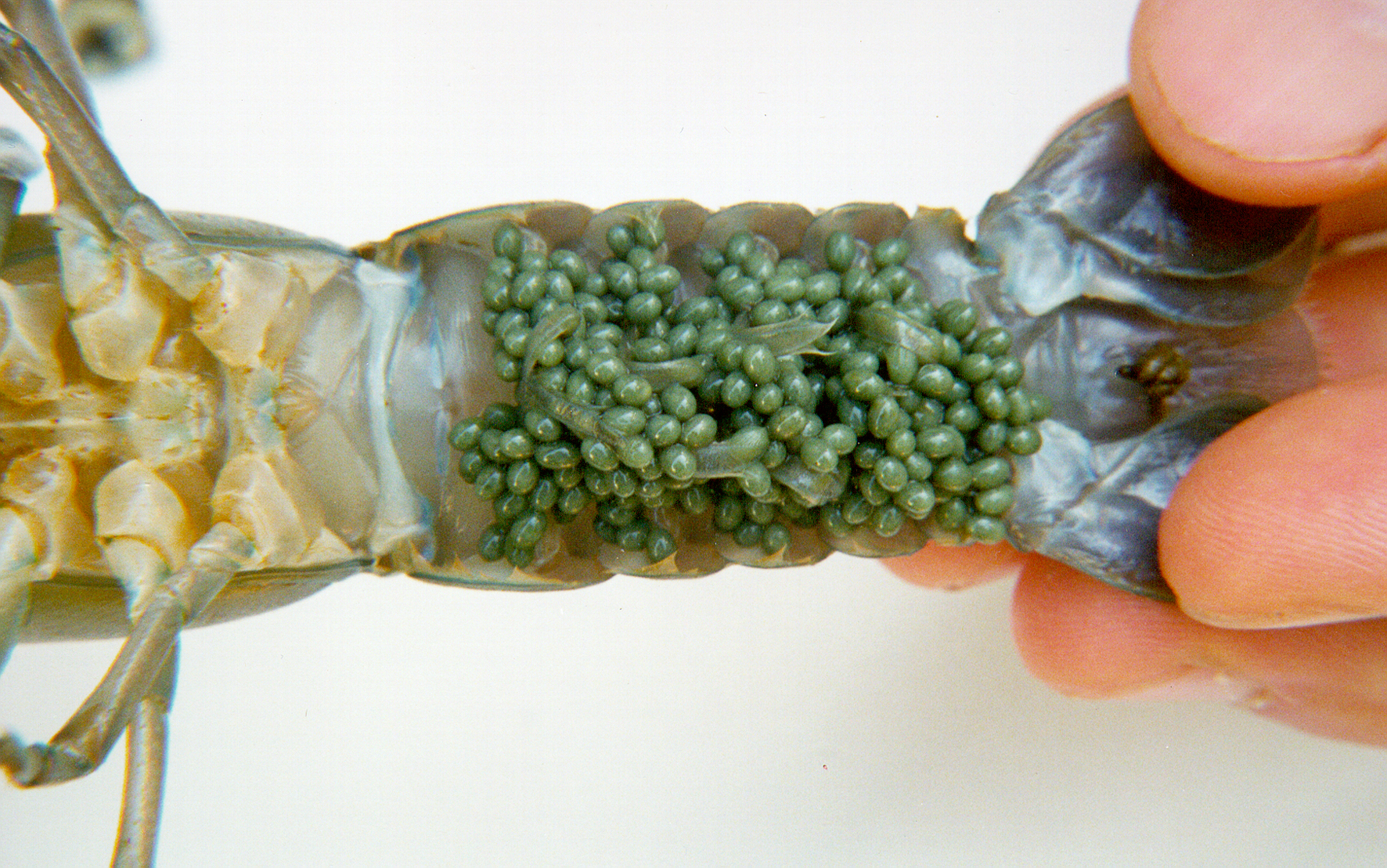
Week-old yabby eggs, 2–3 mm, attached by minute hairs to underside of female abdomen, CSIRO

The common yabby is a popular species for aquaculture, although their burrowing can destroy dams.

Yabbies can also be found in private property dams where permission to fish must first be obtained. Bag limits apply to yabbies in most states. For example, in South Australia it is illegal to catch over 200 yabbies

== Yabbies as food ==
While less common than prawns and other crustaceans, yabbies are eaten in Australia much like crayfish in other countries. Usually, yabbies are boiled and eaten plain, or with condiments. They are also occasionally served at restaurants, where they may be prepared in salads, ravioli, pasta, etc. Prior to cooking, it is advisable to 'purge' the yabby in clean water, this helps to clear the gut of any muddy flavour, resulting in sweeter tasting meat.

In New South Wales, yabbies can be sold live at some fish markets such as Sydney Fish Market. In Victoria, whole yabbies can be purchased cooked and ready to eat at Queen Victoria Market.

== Conservation status ==
Although they are not considered an endangered species, they are considered to be vulnerable by the IUCN. Here, vulnerable refers to how this species may face a high rate of extinction in the wild. This is because their habitat is under constant threat from agricultural chemicals like fertilizers and pesticides. Also, degradation of native vegetation also makes their habitat more vulnerable.

Although this organisms habitat is under threat they are still considered a very adaptive species and are involved in very rapid breeding
