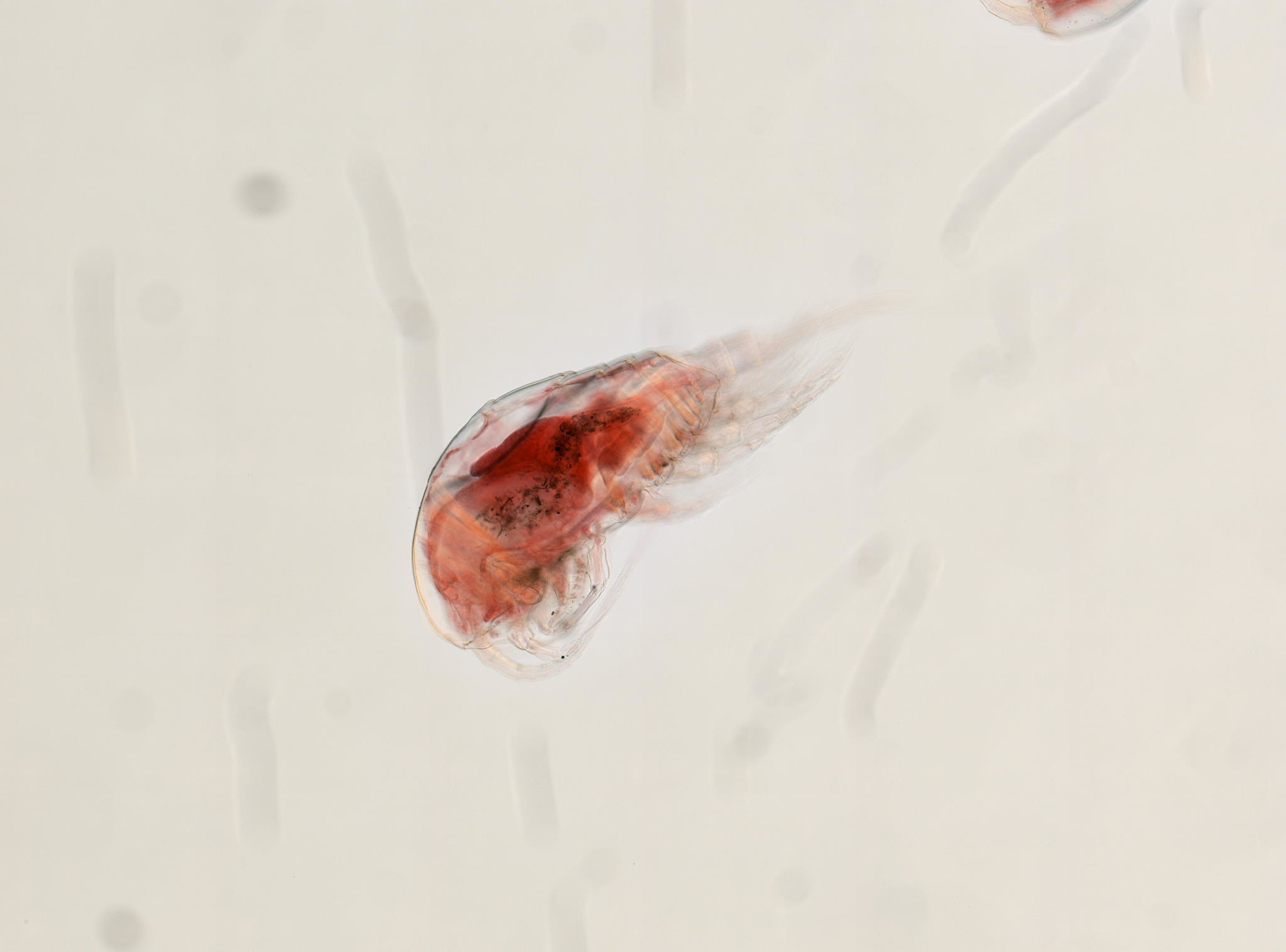
- Temora turbinata

Scientific classification
- Domain: Eukaryota
- Kingdom: Animalia
- Phylum: Arthropoda
- Class: Copepoda
- Order: Calanoida
- Family: Temoridae
- Genus: Temora; Baird, 1850

Type species
- Temora longicornis

Synonyms
- Halitemora Giesbrecht, 1881

= Temora (crustacean) =

Genus of crustaceans

Temora is a genus of copepods in the family Temoridae. The World Register of Marine Species lists the following species:

- Temora discaudata Giesbrecht, 1889
- Temora kerguelensis Wolfenden, 1911
- Temora longicornis (Müller O.F., 1785)
- Temora stylifera (Dana, 1849)
- Temora turbinata (Dana, 1849)

Additionally, Temora curta (Dana, 1849) is considered a taxon inquirendum.

== Taxonomy ==
Temora was originally described by Scottish physician and zoologist William Baird in his 1850 work The Natural History of the British Entomostraca. The genus was named for the palace of ancient Irish kings in James Macpherson's Ossian cycle of poems, published in the prior century. Baird's description was based on specimens preserved in spirits, as he never collected a living specimen. The type locality was the coast of Ireland.

In 1881, Prussian zoologist Wilhelm Giesbrecht proposed dividing the genus into Halitemora (hali, Latin for salt, + temora) and Eurytemora (eury-, Latin for wide or broad, + temora), listing differences in morphology as well as habitat. Halitemora is not currently accepted as valid, but a number of species previously included in Temora have been moved to Eurytemora:

- Temora affinis Poppe, 1880 and Temora inermis Boeck, 1865 (now Eurytemora affinis affinis Poppe, 1880)
- Temora clausii Hoek, 1878 and Temora velox Lilljeborg, 1853 (now Eurytemora velox (Lilljeborg, 1853))

== Description ==
Baird's original description of the genus is as follows:

Head consolidated with first segment of thorax. Thorax composed of five, abdomen of three segments. Antennules two-branched. Legs five pairs, the first four having each a branch of two articulations only. The body is of a dark brown colour (in specimens preserved in spirits). Thorax consists of five segments; the first, with which the head is consolidated, is the largest, the other four gradually becoming smaller as they descend. The abdomen has only three segments, and has a long, bifid, caudal joint, terminated by two short, stout setae, serrated on the edges. The antennae or rami are very long, exceeding the body in length, though not quite equal to the body and abdomen together, and are composed of twenty-four short articulations.

The antennules are two-branched. The first branch consists of two joints, the latter of which is deeply notched at the extremity, and is terminated by seven or eight long hairs. The second branch has six articulations, the first and last of which are of equal length, and the four intervening ones are very short. The first joint gives off from its inner edge four long setae, each of the short ones gives off one, and the last is terminated by two or three of still greater length.

The mandible and its palpilform branch are well developed, and, as well as the three pairs of foot-jaws, exactly resemble those of Diaptomus. The four anterior pairs of feet are all alike, and consist of a basal stalk of two articulations, and two branches of unequal size. The inner branch is much the smaller, but both are divided into two joints. The posterior or fifth pair is almost exactly similar to the corresponding pair in Diaptomus.

Specimens collected range from 0.6 to 2.1 mm. With the possible exception of T. kerguelensis, which is known from few specimens and has no published figures, the fifth leg pair is asymmetrical in all Temora species.

== Distribution and habitat ==
All species of Temora are epipelagic, being found in shallow coastal waters. Most have cosmopolitan distribution, except for T. kerguelensis, which has been found exclusively in subantarctic waters.
