= Temora kerguelensis =

Scientific classification
- Kingdom: Animalia
- Phylum: Arthropoda
- Class: Copepoda
- Order: Calanoida
- Family: Temoridae
- Genus: Temora
- Species: T. kerguelensis

Binomial name
- Temora kerguelensis (Wolfenden, 1911)

Species of crustacean

Temora kerguelensis is a marine copepod in the Temoridae family. It was first described in 1911 by English oceanographer Richard Norris Wolfenden. The adult specimen measures around 2 mm. It has been recorded in sub-Antarctic waters of the southern Indian Ocean near Kerguelen Islands.

This species was described from 2 male specimens that differ from T. longicornis and T. turbinata, collected from depths shallower than 200 m.
