= Epischura massachusettsensis =

Conservation status
- Data Deficient (IUCN 2.3)

Scientific classification
- Kingdom: Animalia
- Phylum: Arthropoda
- Class: Copepoda
- Order: Calanoida
- Family: Temoridae
- Genus: Epischura
- Species: E. massachusettsensis

Binomial name
- Epischura massachusettsensis A. S. Pearse, 1906

Species of crustacean

Epischura massachusettsensis is a species of copepod in the family Temoridae, endemic to Massachusetts. It is listed as Data Deficient on the IUCN Red List. Adult males are around 3 mm (0.12 in) long.

== Taxonomic history ==
Epischura massachusettsensis was first described by Arthur Sperry Pearse in 1906 in a work on the Fresh-Water Copepoda of Massachusetts published in The American Naturalist. This description was based on nine female specimens collected near Wellesley, Massachusetts in April 1905, and the brevity of the description, and the paucity of the material raised some doubts about the species' validity. Subsequent collections were able to demonstrate that the species was indeed valid.
