= Temora discaudata =

Scientific classification
- Kingdom: Animalia
- Phylum: Arthropoda
- Clade: Pancrustacea
- Class: Copepoda
- Order: Calanoida
- Family: Temoridae
- Genus: Temora
- Species: T. discaudata

Binomial name
- Temora discaudata Giesbrecht, 1889

Synonyms
- Calanus scutellatus Dana, 1849

Species of crustacean

Temora discaudata is a copepod in the family Temoridae. It was first described in 1849 by James Dwight Dana, being placed in the Calanus genus. It was described as a member of the Temora genus in 1889 by Prussian zoologist Wilhelm Giesbrecht. The female measures between 1.68 mm to 2.05 mm in length, while the male ranges between 1.65 and 1.85 mm. It is found in the Pacific, Indian, and (marginally) Atlantic Oceans.
