= Elachistocleis skotogaster =

Conservation status
- Least Concern (IUCN 3.1)

Scientific classification
- Kingdom: Animalia
- Phylum: Chordata
- Class: Amphibia
- Order: Anura
- Family: Microhylidae
- Genus: Elachistocleis
- Species: E. skotogaster

Binomial name
- Elachistocleis skotogaster Lavilla, Vaira & Ferrari, 2003

Species of frog

Elachistocleis skotogaster (common name: Santa Victoria oval frog) is a species of frog in the family Microhylidae. It is known with certainty only from the Salta Province in northern Argentina. However, the type locality and some later observations are near the border to Bolivia, and it is possible that some frogs from Bolivia currently attributed to Elachistocleis ovalis belong to this species.

Elachistocleis skotogaster has been documented in its type locality, a subtropical montane moist forest, as well as in another humid montane forest area. Acoustic observations of males calling have been made at roadside ponds in two additional localities within the Salta Province of Argentina. Breeding occurs in ephemeral ponds.
