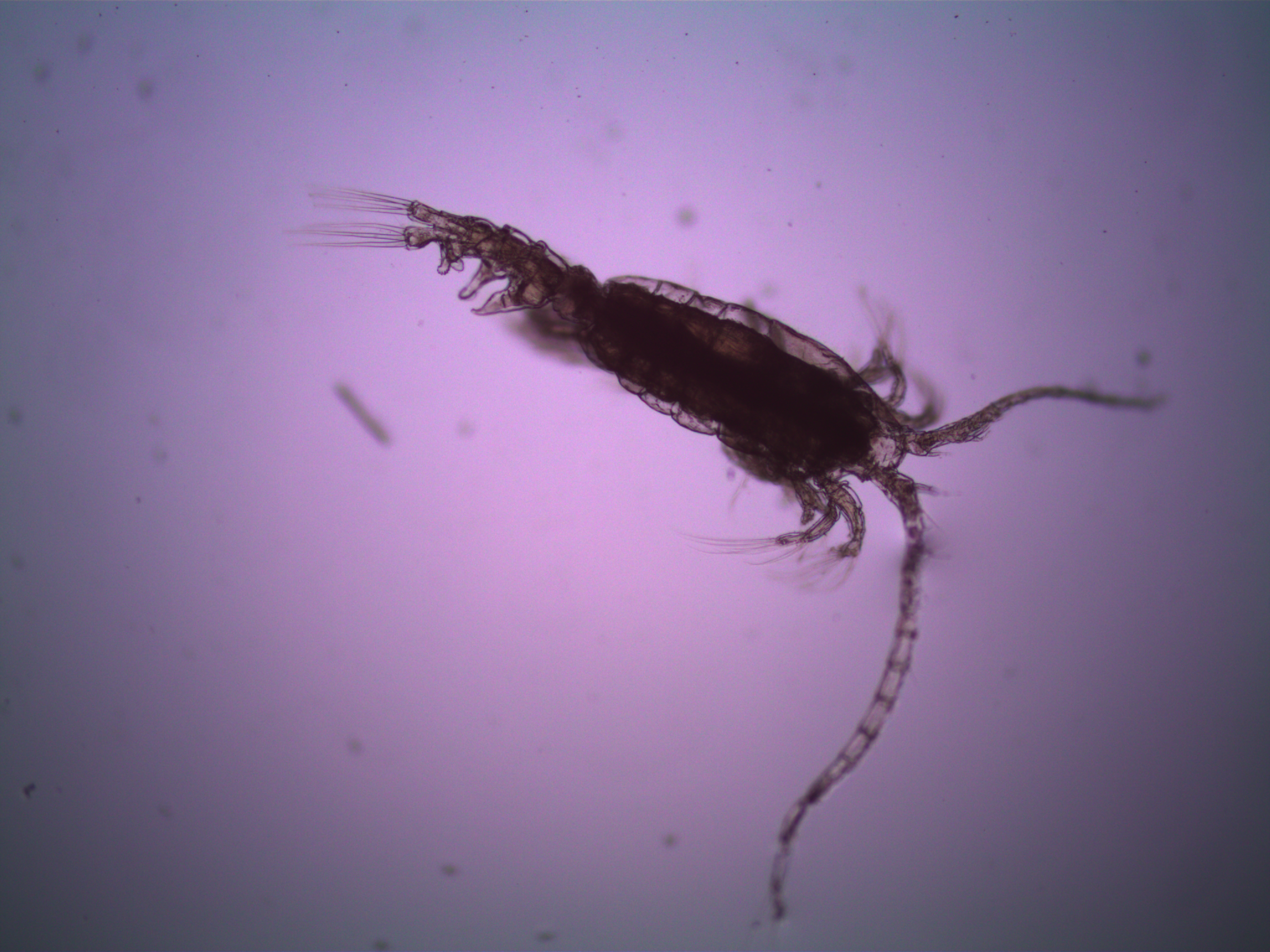
- Male specimen of Epischura lacustris.

Scientific classification
- Kingdom: Animalia
- Phylum: Arthropoda
- Class: Copepoda
- Order: Calanoida
- Family: Temoridae
- Genus: Epischura; S. A. Forbes, 1882

Synonyms
- Scopiphora Pickering, 1844; Lamellipodia Schmeil, 1897

= Epischura =

Genus of crustaceans

Epischura is a genus of copepods in the family Temoridae.

== Species ==
The following species are recognised in the genus Epischura:

- Epischura fluviatilis Herrick, 1883
- Epischura lacustris S. A. Forbes, 1882
- Epischura massachusettsensis Pearse, 1906
- Epischura nevadensis Lilljeborg, 1889
- Epischura nordenskioldi Lilljeborg, 1889
- Epischura smirnovi Borutsky, 1961
- Epischura udylensis Borutsky, 1947
- Epischura vagans Pickering, 1844
- Epischura baikalensis G. O. Sars, 1900
- Epischura chankensis Rylov, 1928

It has recently been proposed that Epischura is paraphyletic with respect to Heterocope and that the Siberian species, Epischura baikalensis and Epischurella chankensis, be moved to the resurrected genus Epischurella.
