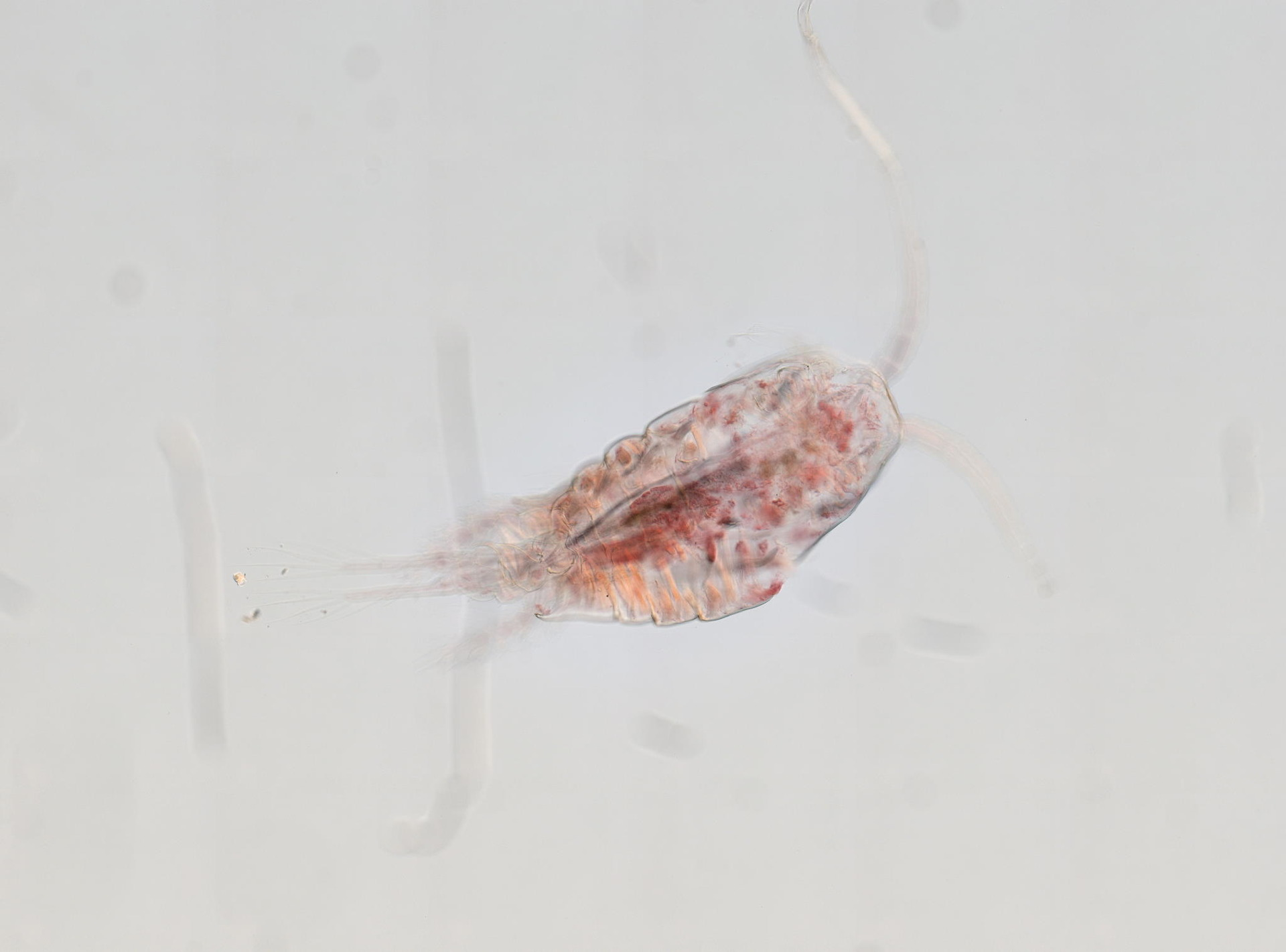

Scientific classification
- Kingdom: Animalia
- Phylum: Arthropoda
- Class: Copepoda
- Order: Calanoida
- Family: Temoridae
- Genus: Temora
- Species: T. stylifera

Binomial name
- Temora stylifera (Dana, 1849)

= Temora stylifera =

Species of crustacean

Temora stylifera is a copepod primarily found in the Atlantic and surrounding waters.

== Description ==
The female of T. stylifera ranges in length from about 1.2 to 2.1 millimetres (0.047 to 0.083 in), and the male is generally between about 1 and 1.9 millimetres (0.039 and 0.075 in) in length.

== Distribution ==
T. stylifera is primarily found in the Atlantic, off of the coasts of Central America, northern South America, western Europe, and northern Africa. It can also be found in large numbers in the Mediterranean Sea and Red Sea.

== Ecology ==
=== Life cycle and reproduction ===
Although T. stylifera is a continuous breeder, it experiences seasonal fluctuations in egg production rate. During one study in the Gulf of Naples, maximum egg production rates were found to occur from about February to July, with minimum rates found between about August and mid-October. In an earlier study, however, maximum egg production was found in late summer, with a period of minimal reproduction occurring in winter. Females can only go about three or four days before needing to remate to continue to produce fertile eggs. The eggs hatch about 88% of the time, with a decrease in success from September to October, and stage I nauplii survive to stage II about 12% of the time. All stages of T. stylifera (from stage I nauplii to adults) are most abundant in the Gulf of Naples from August to October. During this time, stage I through III nauplii are mainly concentrated in the top 10 metres (33 ft) of depth (although they range to 30 metres (98 ft)), and the older nauplii are mainly concentrated in the 30 metres (98 ft) closest to the surface (but they can be found deeper than this). Copepodite stages I through IV are generally more abundant than stage V copepodites. Stage I through III copepodites are usually found in the top 40 metres (130 ft) of the water column, with the distribution of older stages being variable. At some stations, older copepodites are generally found in the top 40 metres (130 ft), whereas at some stations, the distributions may be deeper in the season of highest abundance.
