= Eurytemora lacustris =

Scientific classification
- Domain: Eukaryota
- Kingdom: Animalia
- Phylum: Arthropoda
- Class: Copepoda
- Order: Calanoida
- Family: Temoridae
- Genus: Eurytemora
- Species: E. lacustris

Binomial name
- Eurytemora lacustris (Poppe, 1887)

Species of crustacean

Eurytemora lacustris is a species of crustacean belonging to the family Temoridae.

It is native to Northern Europe, being found in marine environments of the North Atlantic.
