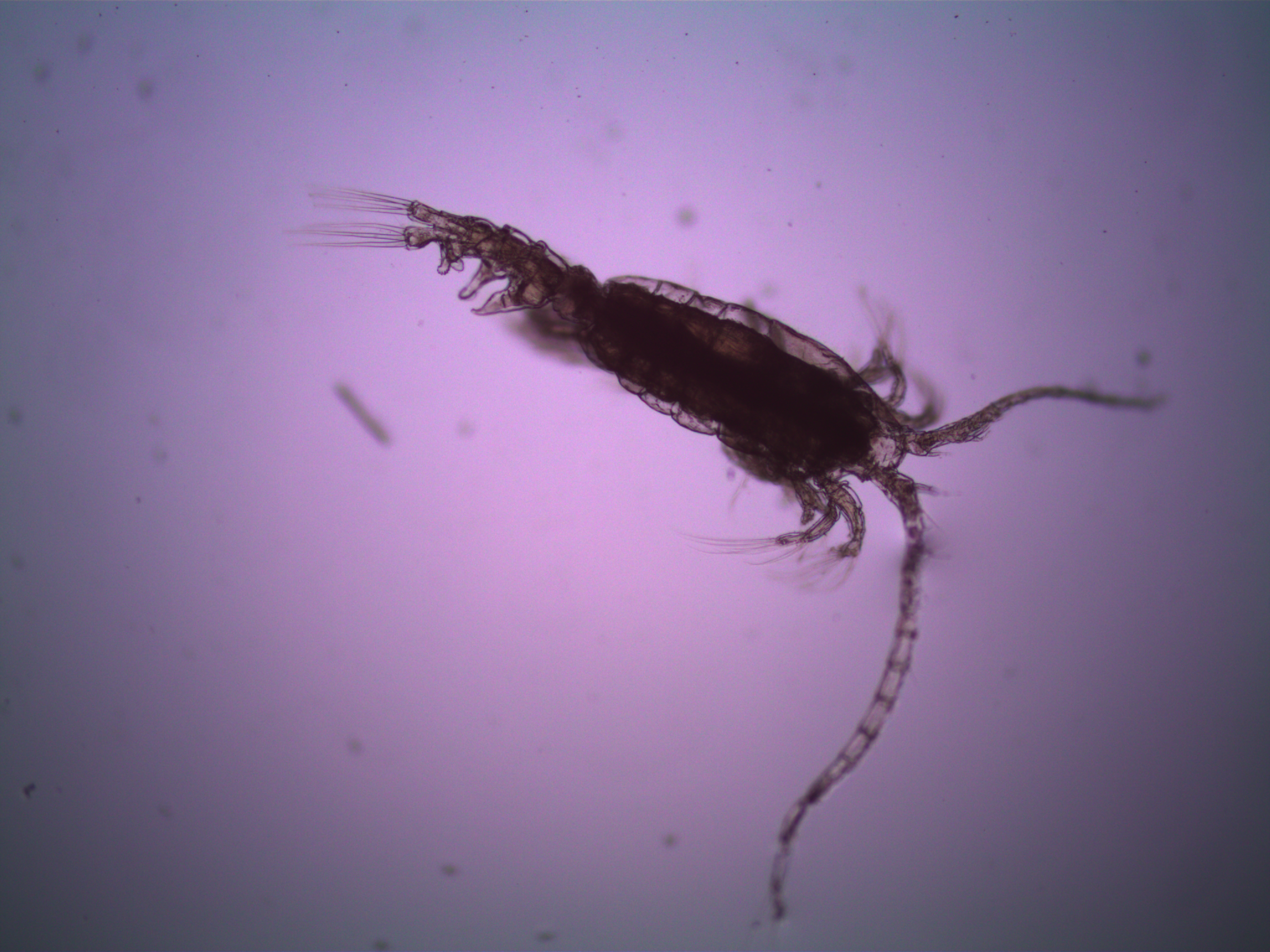
- Male

Scientific classification
- Kingdom: Animalia
- Phylum: Arthropoda
- Class: Copepoda
- Order: Calanoida
- Family: Temoridae
- Genus: Epischura
- Species: E. lacustris

Binomial name
- Epischura lacustris S. A. Forbes, 1882

= Epischura lacustris =

Species of crustacean

Epischura lacustris is a species of copepod in the family Temoridae.

== Distribution ==
The North American distribution of Epischura lacustris spans from the northeastern coastal United States, west to Minnesota, south to central Illinois and is currently found in all 5 of the Great Lakes as well as many other smaller waterbodies throughout its range.

== Identification ==
E. lacustris can be visually separated from all of the other calanoids found in the Great Lakes by looking at their caudal setae and at the urosome portion of their body. E. lacustris have three stout, well-developed setae present on each of the caudal rami, whereas other calanoids will have four or more thin setae. Mature specimens have noticeably bent and crooked urosomes.
