= Elachistocleis panamensis =

Conservation status
- Least Concern (IUCN 3.1)

Scientific classification
- Kingdom: Animalia
- Phylum: Chordata
- Class: Amphibia
- Order: Anura
- Family: Microhylidae
- Genus: Elachistocleis
- Species: E. panamensis

Binomial name
- Elachistocleis panamensis (Dunn, Trapido & Evans, 1948)

Synonyms
- Chiasmocleis panamensis Dunn, Trapido & Evans, 1948

Species of frog

Elachistocleis panamensis (common name: Panama humming frog) is a species of frog in the family Microhylidae. It is found in Colombia and Panama. It is common in some areas in Panama but not considered common in Colombia. It lives in open grassy areas, occasionally within forests, and can also be found in pastures and arable land. It breeds in ponds.

== Diet ==
The species of E. panamensis consists of arachnids and insects, specifically insects of the Hymenoptera order.
