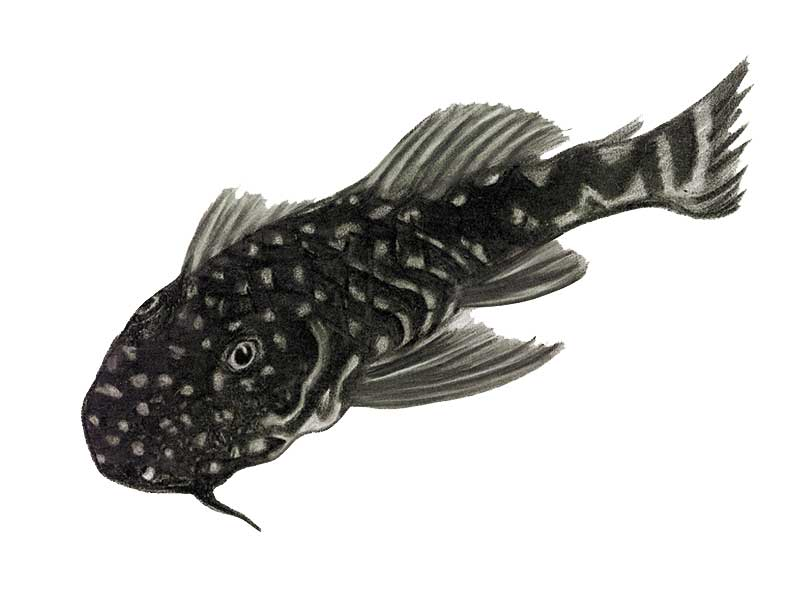

Scientific classification
- Kingdom: Animalia
- Phylum: Chordata
- Class: Actinopterygii
- Order: Siluriformes
- Family: Loricariidae
- Genus: Chaetostoma
- Species: C. pearsei

Binomial name
- Chaetostoma pearsei C. H. Eigenmann, 1920

Synonyms
- Chaetostomus pearsei Eigenmann, 1920

= Chaetostoma pearsei =

Species of catfish

Chaetostoma pearsei, is a species of freshwater ray-finned fish belonging to the family Loricariidae, the suckermouth armoured catfishes, and the subfamily Hypostominae, the suckermouth catfishes. This catfish is endemic to Venezuela where it occurs in the drainage basisn of Lake Valencia and the Tuy River. This species reaches a total length of 15 cm (5.9 in). The specific name honours the American zoologist Arthur Sperry Pearse, who collected the holotype. C. pearsei was first formally described as Chaetostomus pearsei in 1920 by the German-American ichthyologist Carl H. Eigenmann with its type locality given as the Castaño River at Maracay, Venezuela. This species is found in the aquarium trade where it is given the designation L187 and the name Pearse's rubbernose pleco is also sometimes used.
