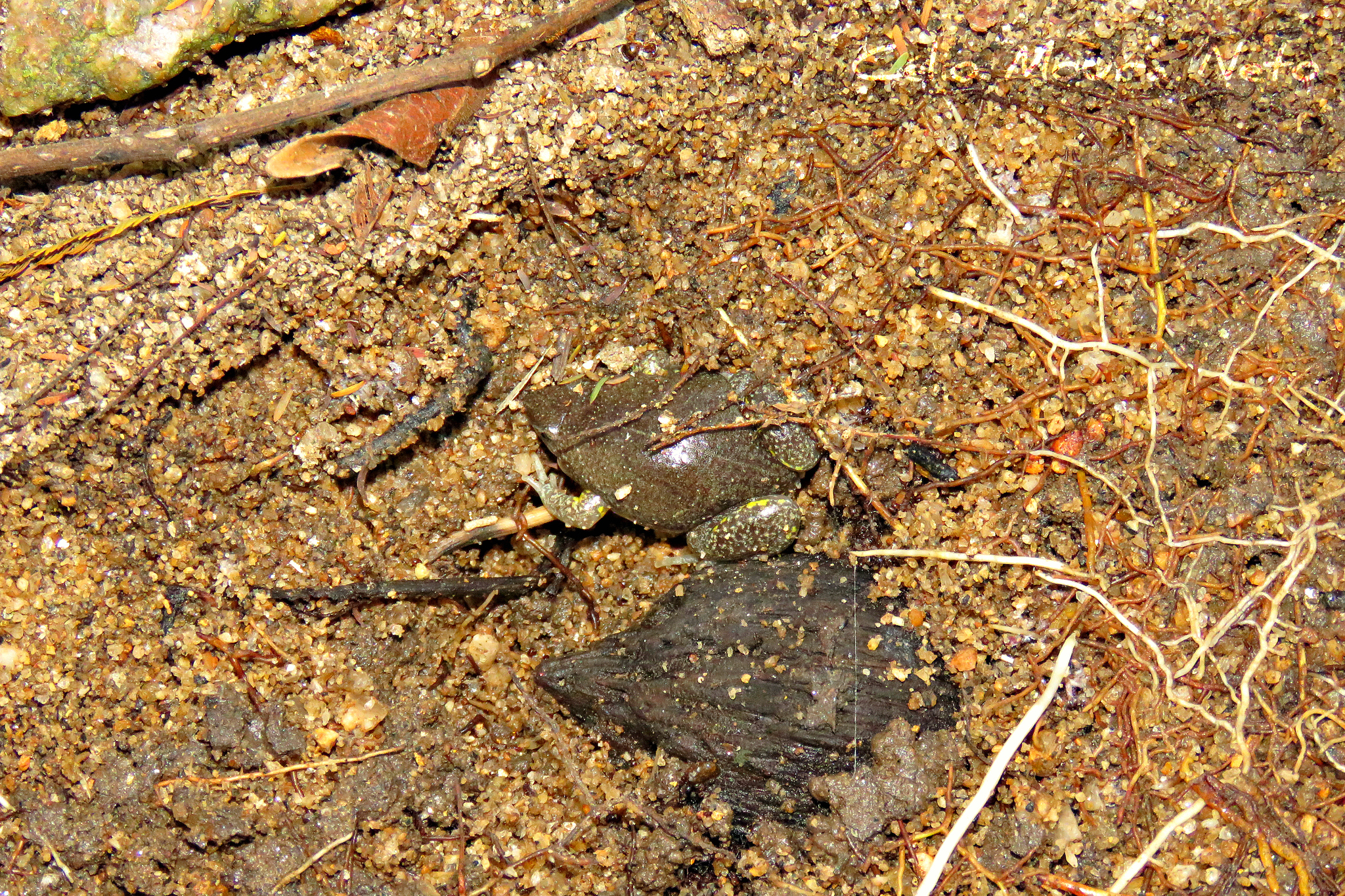

Conservation status
- Least Concern (IUCN 3.1)

Scientific classification
- Kingdom: Animalia
- Phylum: Chordata
- Class: Amphibia
- Order: Anura
- Family: Microhylidae
- Genus: Elachistocleis
- Species: E. piauiensis

Binomial name
- Elachistocleis piauiensis (Caramaschi & Jim, 1983)

= Elachistocleis piauiensis =

Species of frog

Elachistocleis piauiensis is a species of frog in the family Microhylidae. It is endemic to Brazil. Its natural habitats are dry savanna, moist savanna, subtropical or tropical dry shrubland, subtropical or tropical dry lowland grassland, intermittent freshwater marshes, arable land, pastureland, rural gardens, and ponds. It is threatened by habitat loss.
