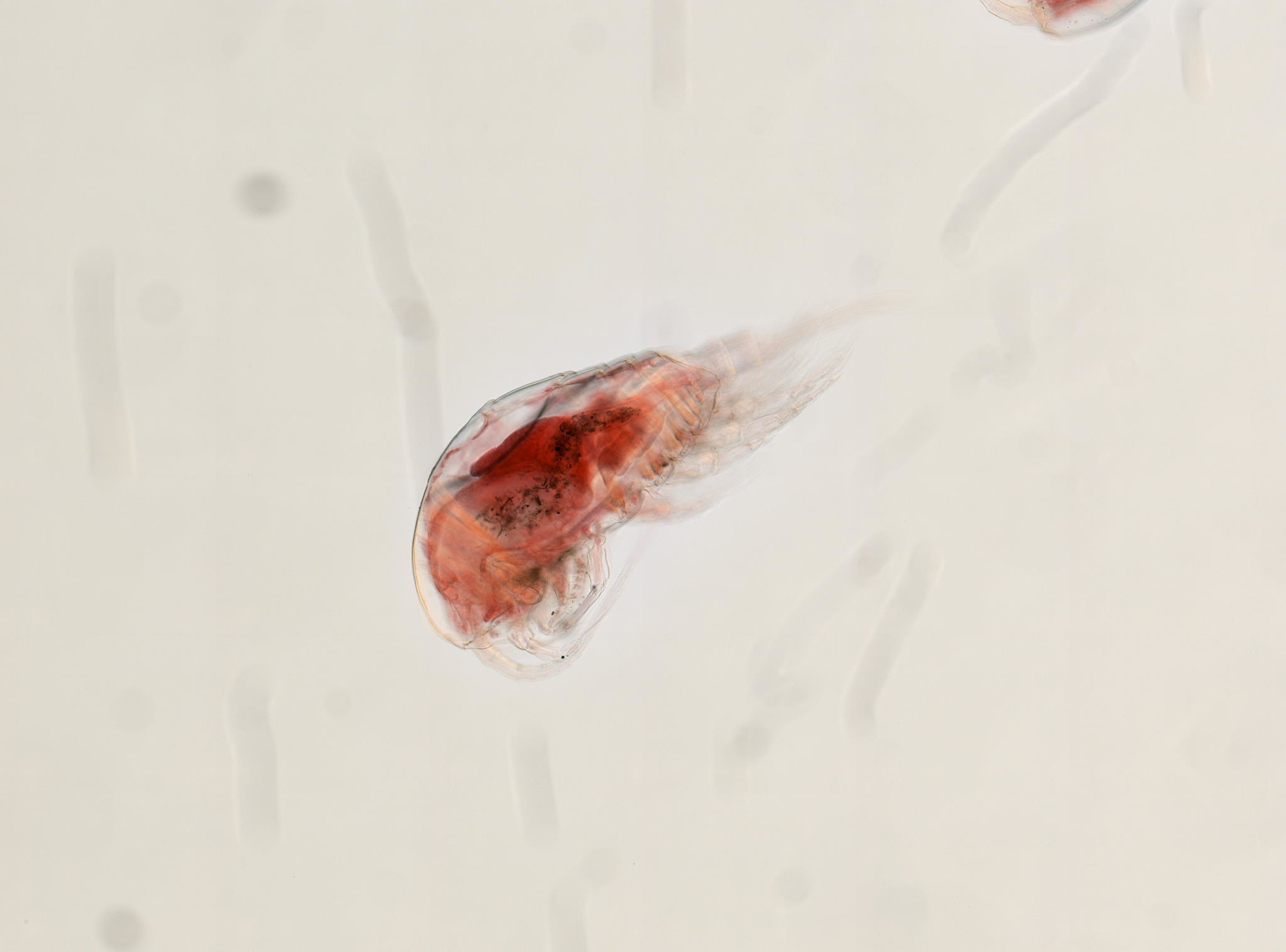

Scientific classification
- Domain: Eukaryota
- Kingdom: Animalia
- Phylum: Arthropoda
- Class: Copepoda
- Order: Calanoida
- Family: Temoridae
- Genus: Temora
- Species: T. turbinata

Binomial name
- Temora turbinata (Dana, 1849)

Synonyms
- Calanus turbinatus Dana, 1849 (original naming); Temora africana Brady, 1914; Temora tenuicauda Brady, 1899

= Temora turbinata =

Species of crustacean

Temora turbinata is a copepod in the Temoridae family. It is an epipelagic species, having been recorded in coastal waters around the world. It was first described in 1849 by American scientist James Dwight Dana.

== Description ==
The female measures between 0.9 mm to 1.6 mm in length, while the male ranges between 1.3 and 1.5 mm.

The cephalosome is shield-like and short, being only up to twice as long as the urosome. One of the male's antennae is geniculated. The female urosome has three segments.
