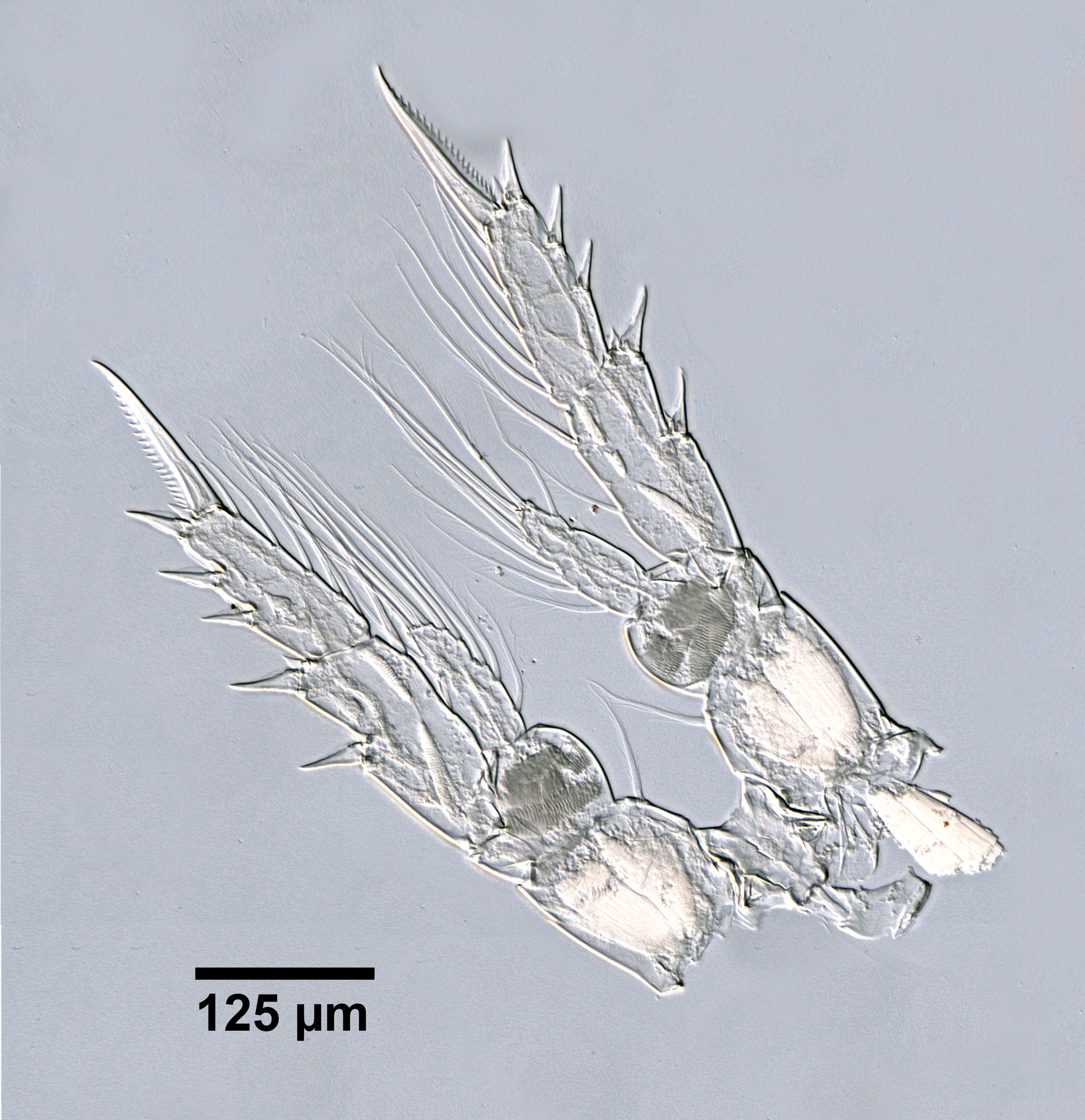

Scientific classification
- Kingdom: Animalia
- Phylum: Arthropoda
- Class: Copepoda
- Order: Calanoida
- Family: Temoridae
- Genus: Temora
- Species: T. longicornis

Binomial name
- Temora longicornis (Müller O.F., 1785)

Synonyms
- Cyclops longicornis Muller, 1785; Diaptomus longicaudatus Lubbock, 1857; Halitemora finmarchica Giesbrecht, 1881; Halitemora longicornis (Müller O.F., 1785); Temora finmarchica Baird, 1850

= Temora longicornis =

Species of crustacean

Temora longicornis is a species of copepod in the family Temoridae. It is found in marine environments on both sides of the Atlantic Ocean.

== Distribution and habitat ==
In North America this copepod occurs between Cape Cod and Florida. In some years it is the commonest calanoid in the winter and spring in the mid-Atlantic region, and sometimes also in summer and autumn in Long Island Sound. It tends to be less abundant in estuaries than in open stretches of coast.

== Ecology ==
Temora longicornis participates in diel vertical migrations, spending the day in the oxygen-minimum zone and swimming to the ocean surface at sunset. Males can swim faster than females, and 3D tracking has shown that males can follow a detectable trail left by females.

This copepod is an omnivore; diatoms are a major part of the diet and phytoplankton is also grazed. This copepod is preyed on heavily by the sand lance in the northwestern Atlantic. It also forms an important part of the diet of the herring (Clupea harengus) and sprat (Sprattus sprattus) in the southern Baltic Sea in the autumn, at which time the copepods are particularly plentiful.

This species' eggs float near the surface before they hatch and the developing larvae move deeper into the water column at each successive moult. The species has been shown to sometimes produce diapausing eggs in the summer months of June and July in Long Island Sound. When this happens, it results in a reduction in the quantity of zooplankton at that time of year. The eggs are buried in the sediment for a species-specific length of time and then hatch, moving into the water column as nauplius larvae as they develop. In the North Sea, dormancy takes place in winter.
