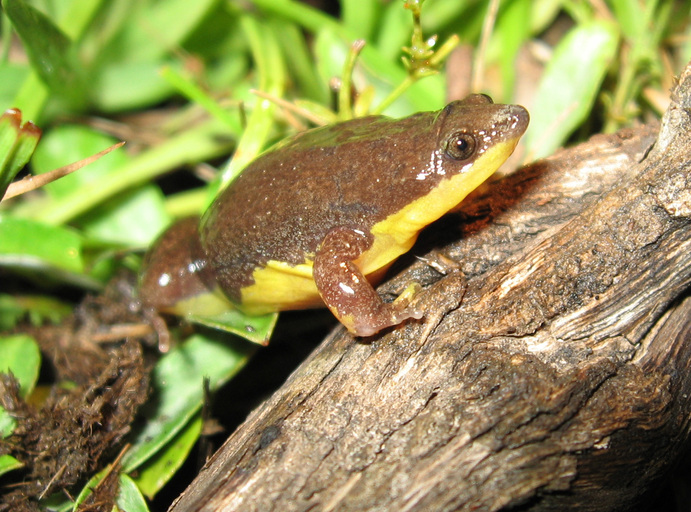

Conservation status
- Least Concern (IUCN 3.1)

Scientific classification
- Kingdom: Animalia
- Phylum: Chordata
- Class: Amphibia
- Order: Anura
- Family: Microhylidae
- Genus: Elachistocleis
- Species: E. bicolor

Binomial name
- Elachistocleis bicolor (Guérin-Meneville, 1838)

= Elachistocleis bicolor =

Species of frog

Elachistocleis bicolor (common name: two-colored oval frog, Spanish: rana pinguino or sapito panza amarilla) is a species of frog in the family Microhylidae. It is found in central Argentina and northward through Paraguay and Uruguay to Amazonian Brazil; earlier reports from Bolivia probably refer to Elachistocleis haroi.

== Habitat ==
Elachistocleis bicolor is an abundant species occurring in seasonally flooded grasslands and in dry and moist forests. It can also survive in rural gardens and urban areas.

== Description ==
Elachistocleis bicolor are nocturnal and semi-fossorial in their lifestyle. During periods of aestivation, they can be found inside ant and termite nests. Male Elachistocleis bicolor grow to a snout–vent length of 23–32 mm (0.91–1.26 in) and females to 27–36 mm (1.1–1.4 in). Its name refers to its striking colour pattern with brownish back and yellowish dorsum.

Elachistocleis bicolor feed primarily on ants and termites, with other insects making minor contributions to their diets. In one study in Uruguay, termites were more important during the inactive season whereas ants (particularly Pheidole and Solenopsis) were more important during the active season.

== Reproduction ==
Reproduction takes place during the wet season in pools with standing water. Fecundity is about 620 eggs and positively correlated with female size. Eggs float on top of the water.
