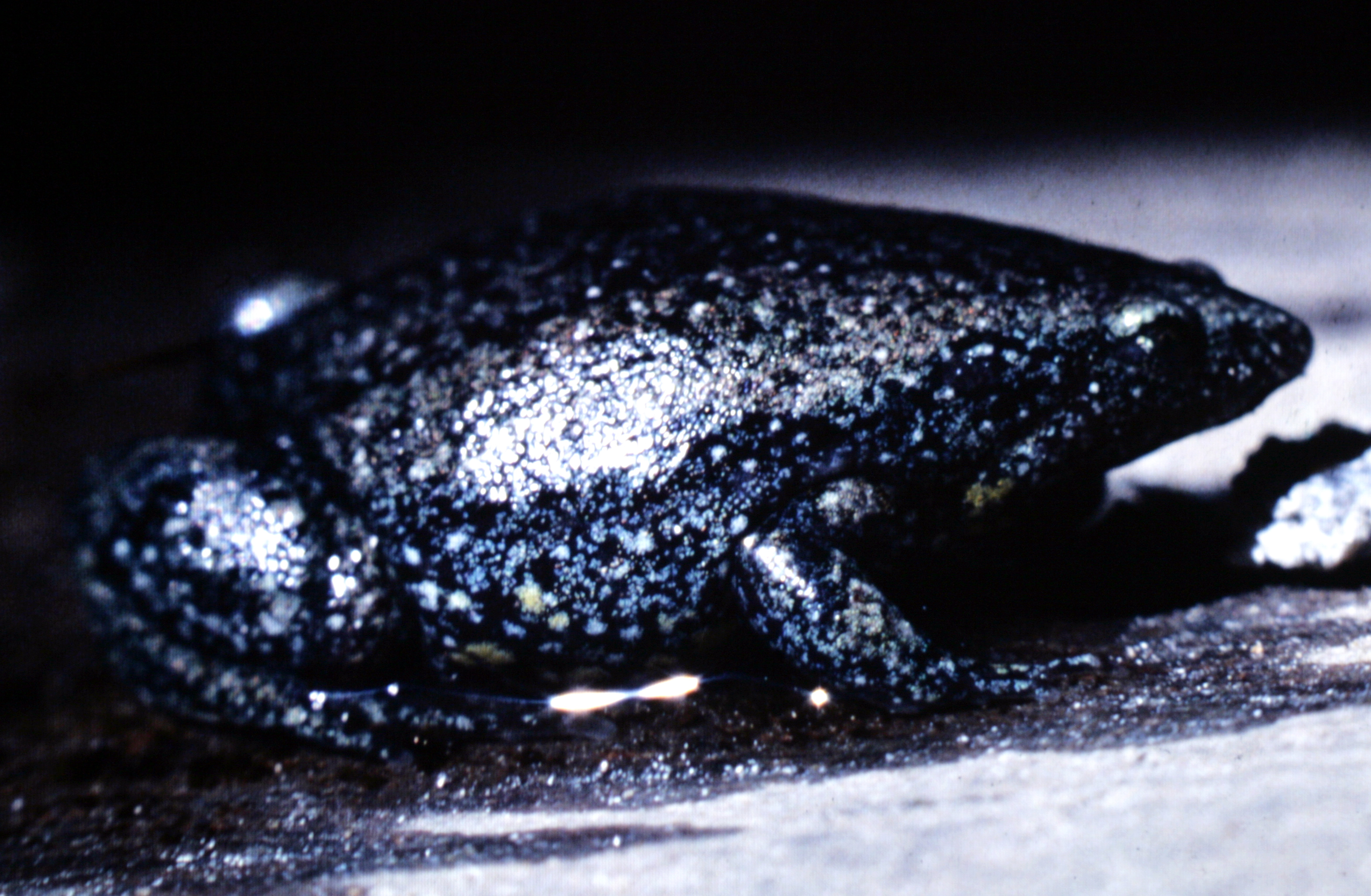
- Elachistocleis surinamensis

Scientific classification
- Kingdom: Animalia
- Phylum: Chordata
- Class: Amphibia
- Order: Anura
- Family: Microhylidae
- Subfamily: Gastrophryninae
- Genus: Elachistocleis; Parker, 1927

Type species
- Rana ovalis Schneider, 1799

Species
- See text.

Synonyms
- Relictivomer

= Elachistocleis =

Genus of amphibians

Elachistocleis is a genus of microhylid frogs found in southern America from Panama southwards. Their common name is oval frogs, although for historic reasons not all species are named so.

== Taxonomy ==
A 2021 study found that the genus originated in the Andes during the Oligocene, and contains two distinct clades that diverged from one another during the Middle Miocene. They dispersed throughout South America following the drying-out of the Pebas mega-wetland system, aided by the Amazon basin and other hydrological systems.

Recent taxonomic evidence indicates that the type species, E. ovalis, is a nomen nudum, as it has no holotype, type locality, and its description lacks detail. The name has been applied to many Elachistocleis populations across South America, which are all now considered to represent undescribed species (with one of these from Trinidad and northern Venezuela being described as E. nigrogularis in 2021). In addition, another Elachistocleis identified from Trinidad in a 1980 study likely represents another undescribed species.

== Species ==
The following species are recognised in the genus Elachistocleis:

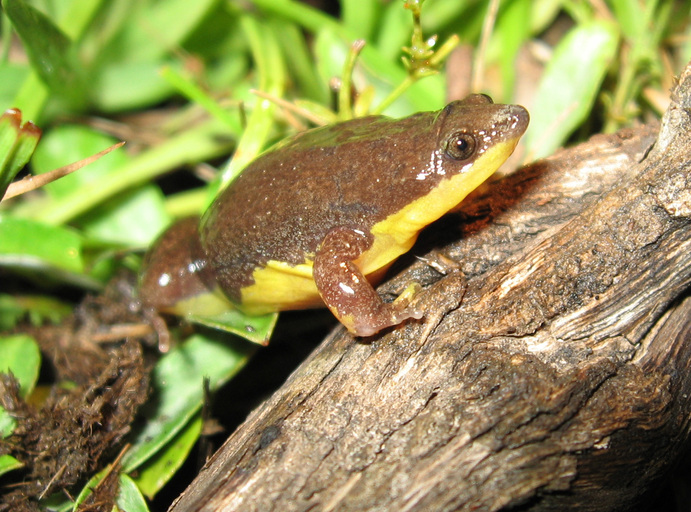
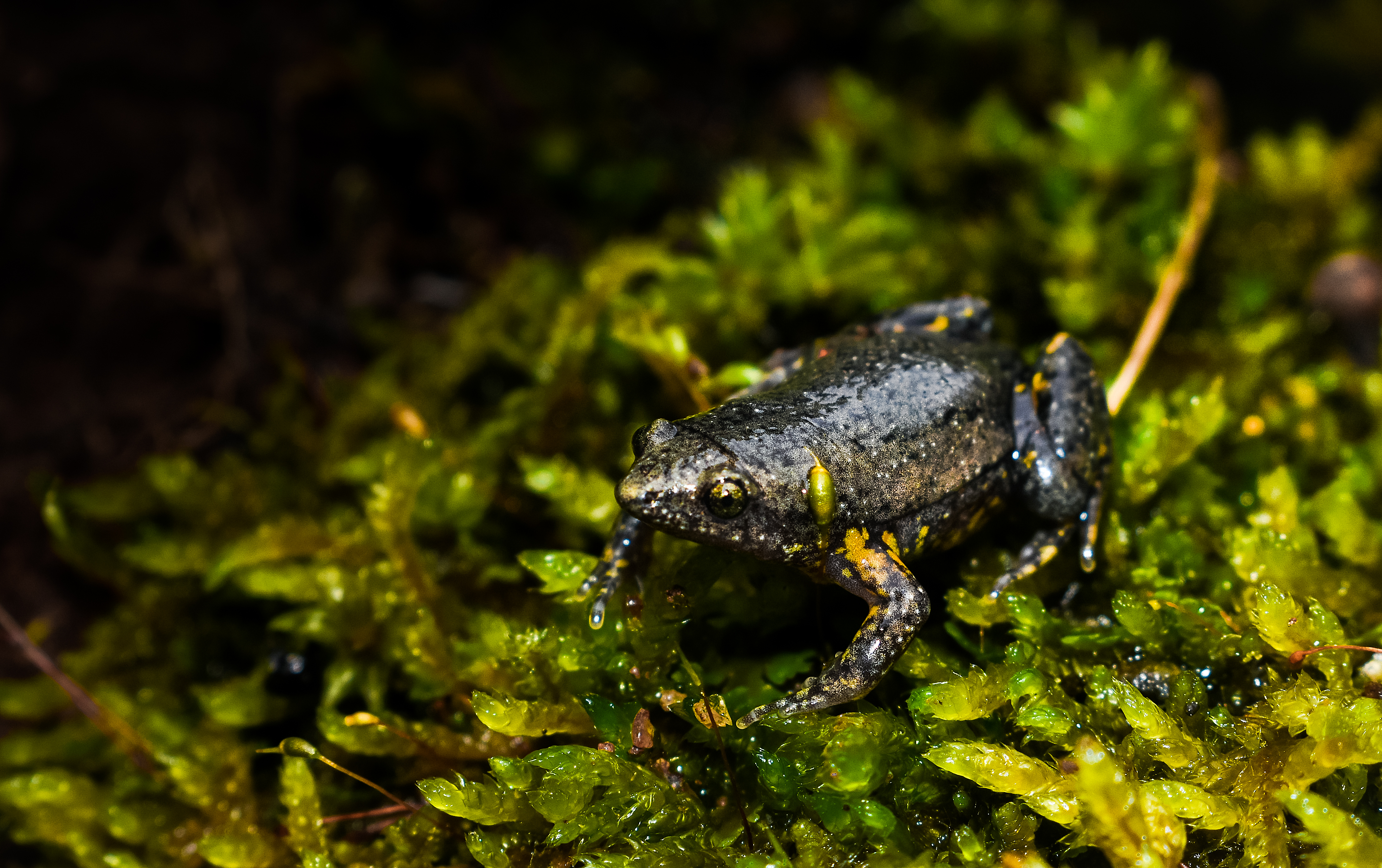
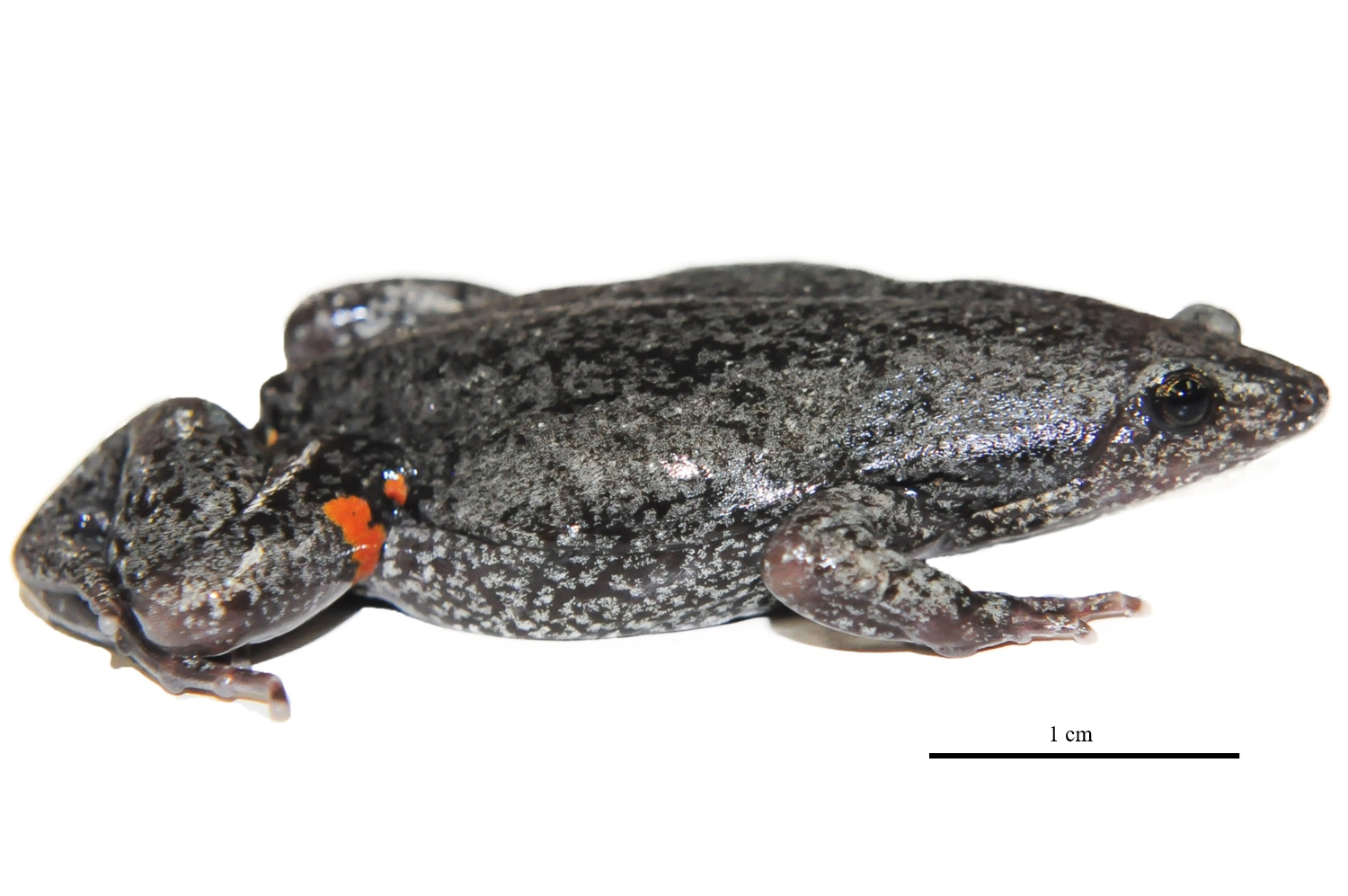
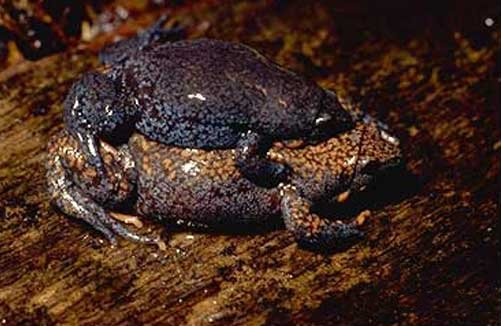
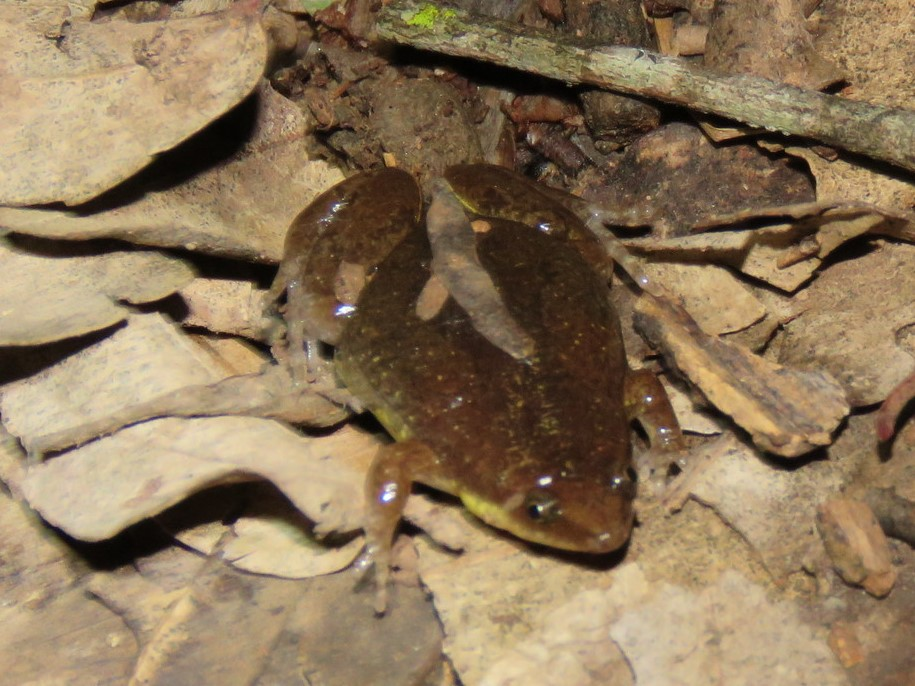
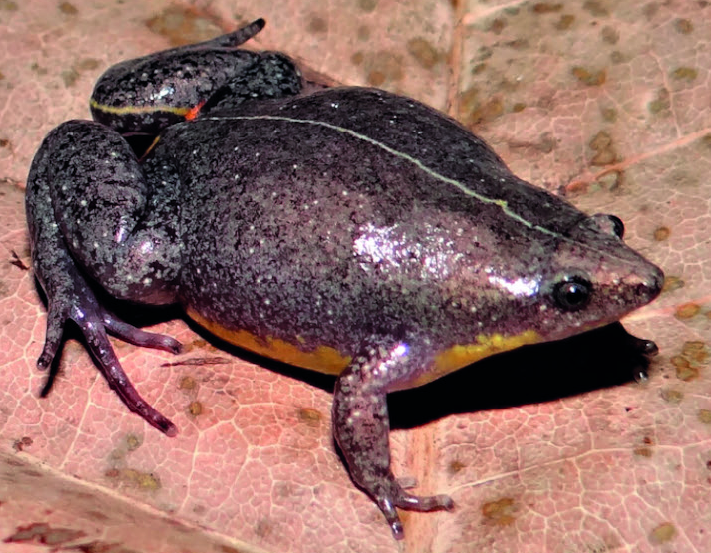
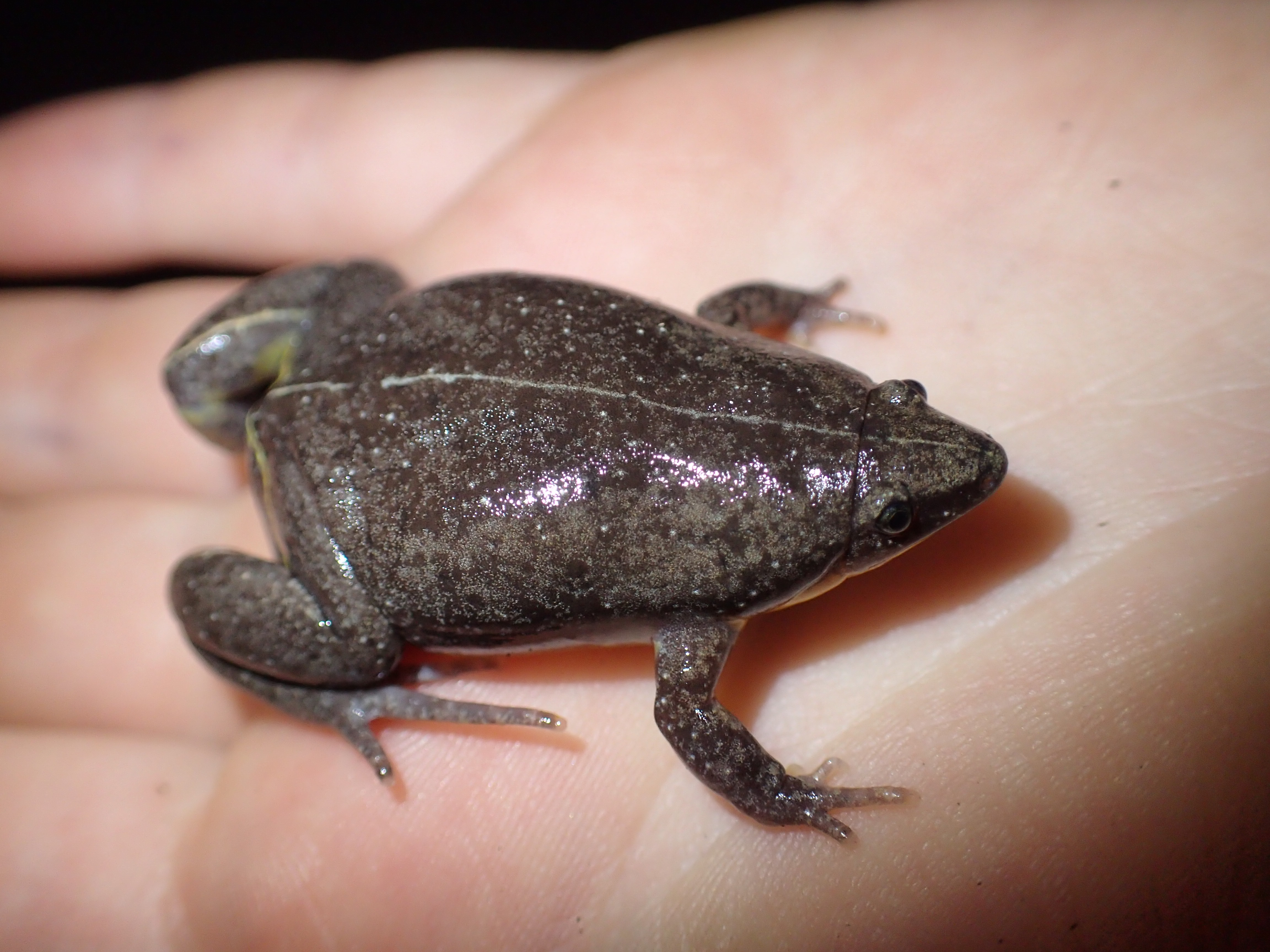
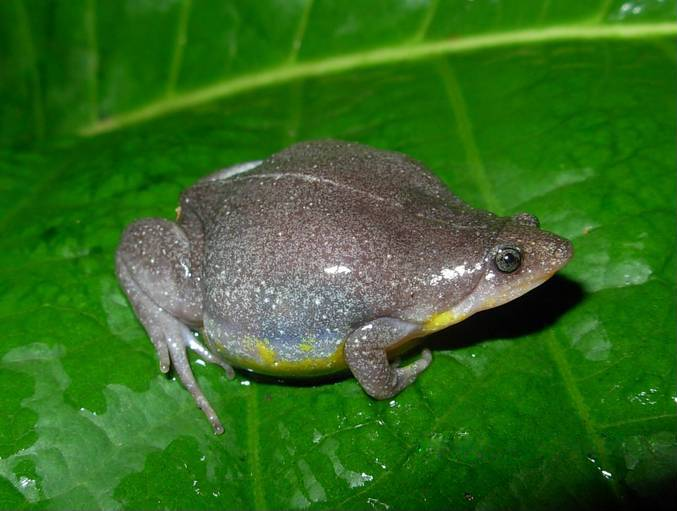
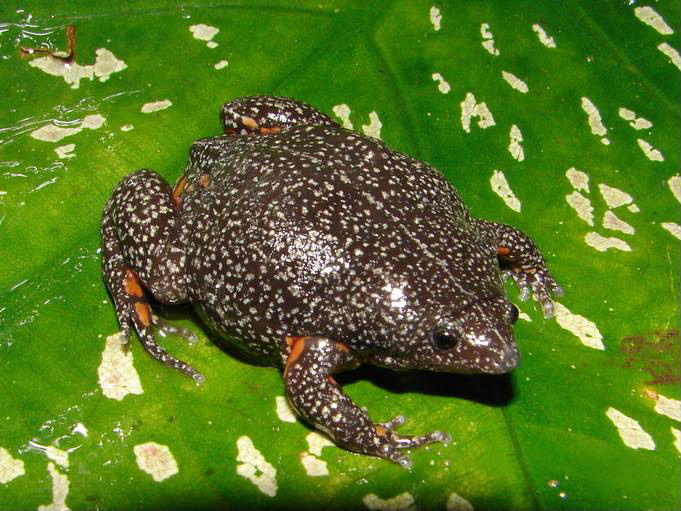
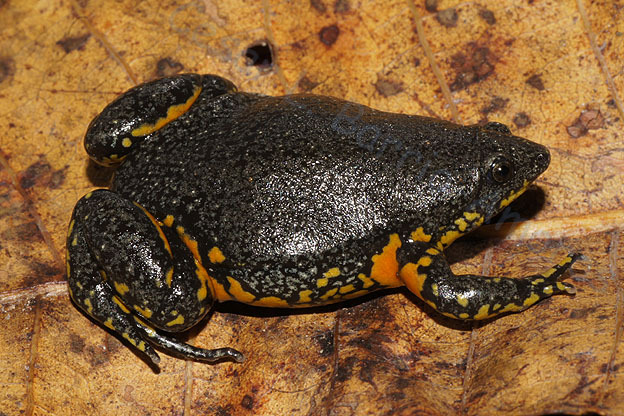
Binomial name and author	Common name	Image
Elachistocleis bicolor(Guérin-Méneville, 1838)	Two-colored oval frog
Elachistocleis bumbameuboi Caramaschi, 2010	Maranhão Oval Frog
Elachistocleis carvalhoi Caramaschi, 2010	Northwestern Tocantins Oval Frog
Elachistocleis cesarii (Miranda-Ribeiro, 1920)	São Paulo Oval Frog
Elachistocleis corumbaensis (Miranda-Ribeiro, 1920)Piva, Caramaschi, and Albuquerque, 2017	Piraputangas Oval Frog
Elachistocleis erythrogaster Kwet & Di-Bernardo, 1998	Red-bellied oval frog
Elachistocleis haroi Pereyra, Akmentins, Laufer & Vaira, 2013	Jujuy Oval Frog
Elachistocleis helianneae Caramaschi, 2010	Humaitá Oval Frog
Elachistocleis nigrogularis Jowers, Othman, Borzée, Rivas, Sánchez-Ramírez, Auguste, Downie, Read & Murphy, 2021	Black-throated Oval Frog (nomen nudum)
Elachistocleis magna Toledo, 2010	Rondônia Oval Frog
Elachistocleis matogrosso Caramaschi, 2010	Mato Grosso Oval Frog
Elachistocleis muiraquitan Nunes-de-Almeida and Toledo, 2012	Acre's Oval Frog
Elachistocleis ovalis (Schneider, 1799)	Common oval frog (nomen nudum)
Elachistocleis panamensis (Dunn, Trapido, and Evans, 1948)	Panama humming frog
Elachistocleis pearsei (Ruthven, 1914)	Colombian plump frog
Elachistocleis piauiensis Caramaschi & Jim, 1983	Piaui oval frog
Elachistocleis skotogaster Lavilla, Vaira & Ferrari, 2003	Santa Victoria oval frog
Elachistocleis surinamensis (Daudin, 1802)	Surinam oval frog
Elachistocleis surumu Caramaschi, 2010	Roraima Oval Frog
