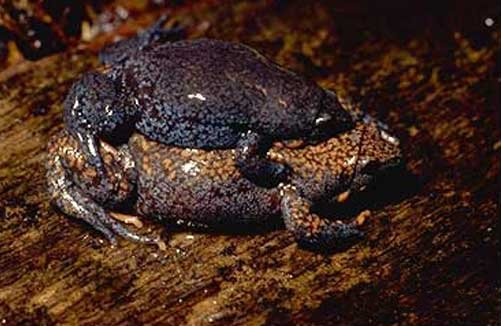

Conservation status
- Near Threatened (IUCN 3.1)

Scientific classification
- Kingdom: Animalia
- Phylum: Chordata
- Class: Amphibia
- Order: Anura
- Family: Microhylidae
- Genus: Elachistocleis
- Species: E. erythrogaster

Binomial name
- Elachistocleis erythrogaster Kwet & Di-Bernardo, 1999

= Elachistocleis erythrogaster =

Species of frog

Elachistocleis erythrogaster is a species of frog in the family Microhylidae. It is endemic to Brazil. Its natural habitats are moist savanna, subtropical or tropical seasonally wet or flooded lowland grassland, intermittent freshwater marshes, and pastureland. It is threatened by habitat loss.
