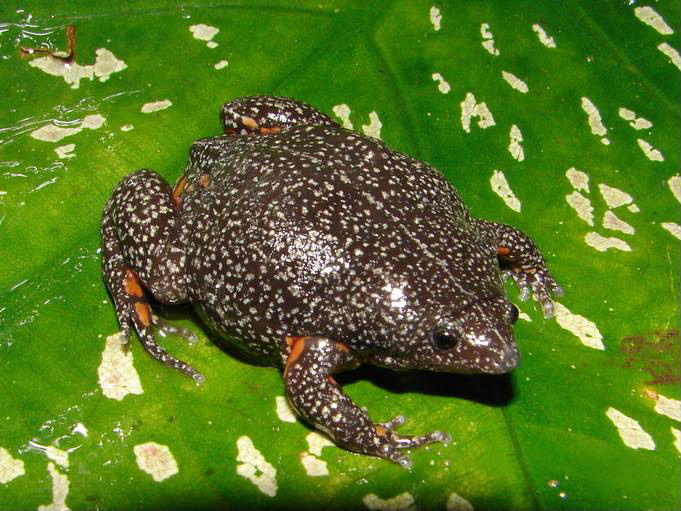

Conservation status
- Least Concern (IUCN 3.1)

Scientific classification
- Kingdom: Animalia
- Phylum: Chordata
- Class: Amphibia
- Order: Anura
- Family: Microhylidae
- Genus: Elachistocleis
- Species: E. pearsei

Binomial name
- Elachistocleis pearsei (Ruthven, 1914)

Synonyms
- Hypopachus pearsei Ruthven, 1914; Relictivomer pearsei (Ruthven, 1914); Engystoma pearsei (Ruthven, 1914)

= Elachistocleis pearsei =

Species of amphibian

Elachistocleis pearsei (common name: Colombian plump frog) is a species of frog in the family Microhylidae. It is found in the Pacific versant of western Costa Rica, Panama, Caribbean lowlands of Colombia and into the Magdalena River Valley, and in northwest Venezuela.

Elachistocleis pearsei was until 2012 considered to form monotypic genus Relictivomer, but in molecular phylogeny Elachistocleis pearsei is nested within other Elachistocleis, leading to resurrection of name Elachistocleis pearsei.

Elachistocleis pearsei is a nocturnal and fossorial lowland frog occurring at elevations less than 750 m (2,460 ft). Its range extends from lowland dry forests to premontane rain/wet forests. Breeding takes place in temporary and permanent pools after the rains. It probably is locally impacted by habitat loss.

== Etymology ==
The specific name pearsei honors Arthur Sperry Pearse, an American zoologist.
