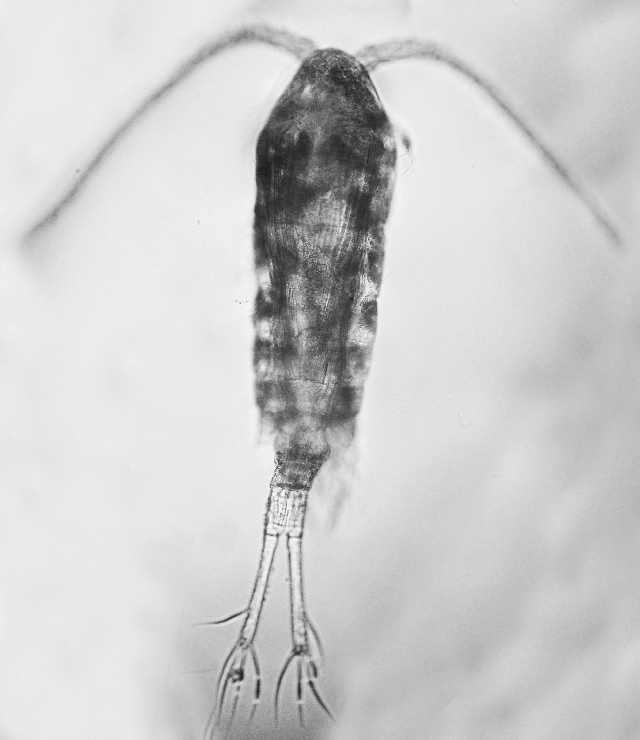
- Eurytemora affinis

Scientific classification
- Kingdom: Animalia
- Phylum: Arthropoda
- Clade: Pancrustacea
- Class: Copepoda
- Order: Calanoida
- Family: Temoridae
- Genus: Eurytemora; Giesbrecht, 1881

Type species
- Eurytemora affinis

Synonyms
- Temorella Claus, 1881

= Eurytemora =

Genus of crustaceans

Eurytemora is a genus of copepods in the family Temoridae.

In E. affinis, the populations that invaded freshwater environments experienced directional selection for improved osmoregulatory ability, such that individuals were able to cope better with lowered levels of salinity and therefore survive and reproduce more successfully.

== Species ==
The World Register of Marine Species lists the following species:

- Eurytemora affinis (Poppe, 1880)
- Eurytemora americana Williams, 1906
- Eurytemora arctica Wilson M.S. & Tash, 1966
- Eurytemora asymmetrica Smirnov, 1935
- Eurytemora bilobata Akatova, 1949
- Eurytemora brodskyi Kos, 1993
- Eurytemora canadensis Marsh, 1920
- Eurytemora carolleeae Alekseev & Souissi, 2011
- Eurytemora caspica Sukhikh & Alekseev, 2013
- Eurytemora clausii (Hoek, 1876)
- Eurytemora composita Keiser, 1929
- Eurytemora foveola Johnson M.W., 1961
- Eurytemora gracilicauda Akatova, 1949
- Eurytemora gracilis (Sars G.O., 1898)
- Eurytemora grimmi (Sars G.O., 1897)
- Eurytemora herdmani Thompson I.C. & Scott A., 1897 in Thompson, Scott & Herdman, 1897
- Eurytemora kurenkovi Borutsky, 1961
- Eurytemora lacinulata (Fischer, 1853)
- Eurytemora lacustris (Poppe, 1887)
- Eurytemora minor Behning, 1938
- Eurytemora pacifica Sato, 1913
- Eurytemora raboti Richard, 1897
- Eurytemora richingsi Heron & Damkaer, 1976
- Eurytemora velox (Lilljeborg, 1853)
- Eurytemora wolterecki Mann, 1940
- Eurytemora yukonensis Wilson M.S., 1953
