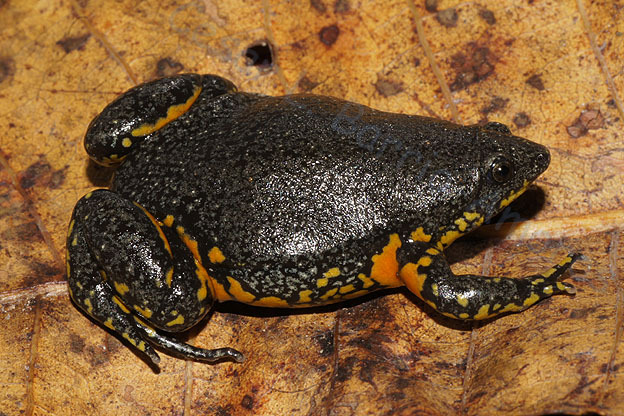
- E. surinamensis in Atures, Amazonas, Venezuela

Conservation status
- Least Concern (IUCN 3.1)

Scientific classification
- Kingdom: Animalia
- Phylum: Chordata
- Class: Amphibia
- Order: Anura
- Family: Microhylidae
- Genus: Elachistocleis
- Species: E. surinamensis

Binomial name
- Elachistocleis surinamensis (Daudin, 1802)

= Elachistocleis surinamensis =

Species of frog

Elachistocleis surinamensis is a species of frog in the family Microhylidae. It is found in Suriname, Trinidad and Tobago, Venezuela, and possibly Guyana. Its natural habitats are subtropical or tropical moist lowland forests, moist savanna, and intermittent freshwater marshes. It is threatened by habitat loss.
