= Arthur Sperry Pearse =

American biologist (1877–1956)

Arthur Sperry Pearse (March 15, 1877 – December 11, 1956) was a botanist and zoologist from the United States. He was born at a Pawnee people reserve in Crete, Nebraska, where his parents had a commercial outpost. He earn a BA at the University of Nebraska in 1900 and a MA, at the same university in 1904. Pearse received his Ph.D. in zoology from Harvard University in 1908, with a dissertation entitled "The Reaction of Amphibians to Light". After earning his PH.D he taught at the University of Michigan and later he became part of the faculty at the University of Wisconsin. In 1926, he became the president of the Ecological Society of America. He joined the Biology Department of Duke University in 1927. Here he founded Ecological Monographs, that was the first science journal from the Duke University Press. In 1935, a new Zoology Department was created under the leadership of Pearse. He later play a significant role in the creation of the Marine Laboratory in Beaufort, North Carolina, where he was the Director from 1938 to 1945. He retired in 1948.

== Taxon named in his honor ==
- The Colombian plump frog Elachistocleis pearsei is a species of frog in the family Microhylidae. It is found in the Pacific versant of western Costa Rica, Panama, Caribbean lowlands of Colombia and into the Magdalena River Valley, and in northwest Venezuela.
- The Mexican blind brotula, Typhliasina pearsei is a species of viviparous brotula endemic to Mexico, where it is found in sinkholes and caves.
- Chaetostoma pearsei is a species of catfish in the family Loricariidae. It is native to South America, where it occurs in the basins of the Tuy River and Lake Valencia in Venezuela.
- Cincelichthys pearsei, the Pantano cichlid, is a species of fish in the family Cichlidae from the Usumacinta River basin in southern Mexico and northern Guatemala.

== Possible Taxon named in his honor ==
These taxa may or may not have been named after Pearse

- Chaceus pearsei, a crab in the family Pseudothelphusidae
- Crocosmia pearsei, a plant in the family Iridaceae
- Pseudocellus pearsei (Chamberlin & Ivie, 1938) — Mexico
- The seastar Odontaster pearsei Janosik & Halanych, 2010
- Anopsicus pearsei Chamberlin & Ivie, 1938 (type) – Mexico
- Caulibugula pearsei Maturo, 1966
- The Sponge Oscarella pearsei Ereskovsky, Richter, Lavrov, Schippers & Nichols, 2017
- A species of wood lice Trichorhina pearsei
- The flatworm Bothriocephalus pearsei Scholz, Vargas-Vázquez & Moravec, 1996
- The flatworm Proteocephalus pearsei La Rue, 1919
- The shrimp Typhlatya pearsei Creaser, 1936 – Yucatán Peninsula
- Periclimenaeus pearsei (Schmitt, 1932)
- Typhlias pearsei Hubbs, 1938
- The Crayfish Procambarus pearsei (Creaser, 1934)
- The ant Nylanderia pearsei Wheeler, 1938
