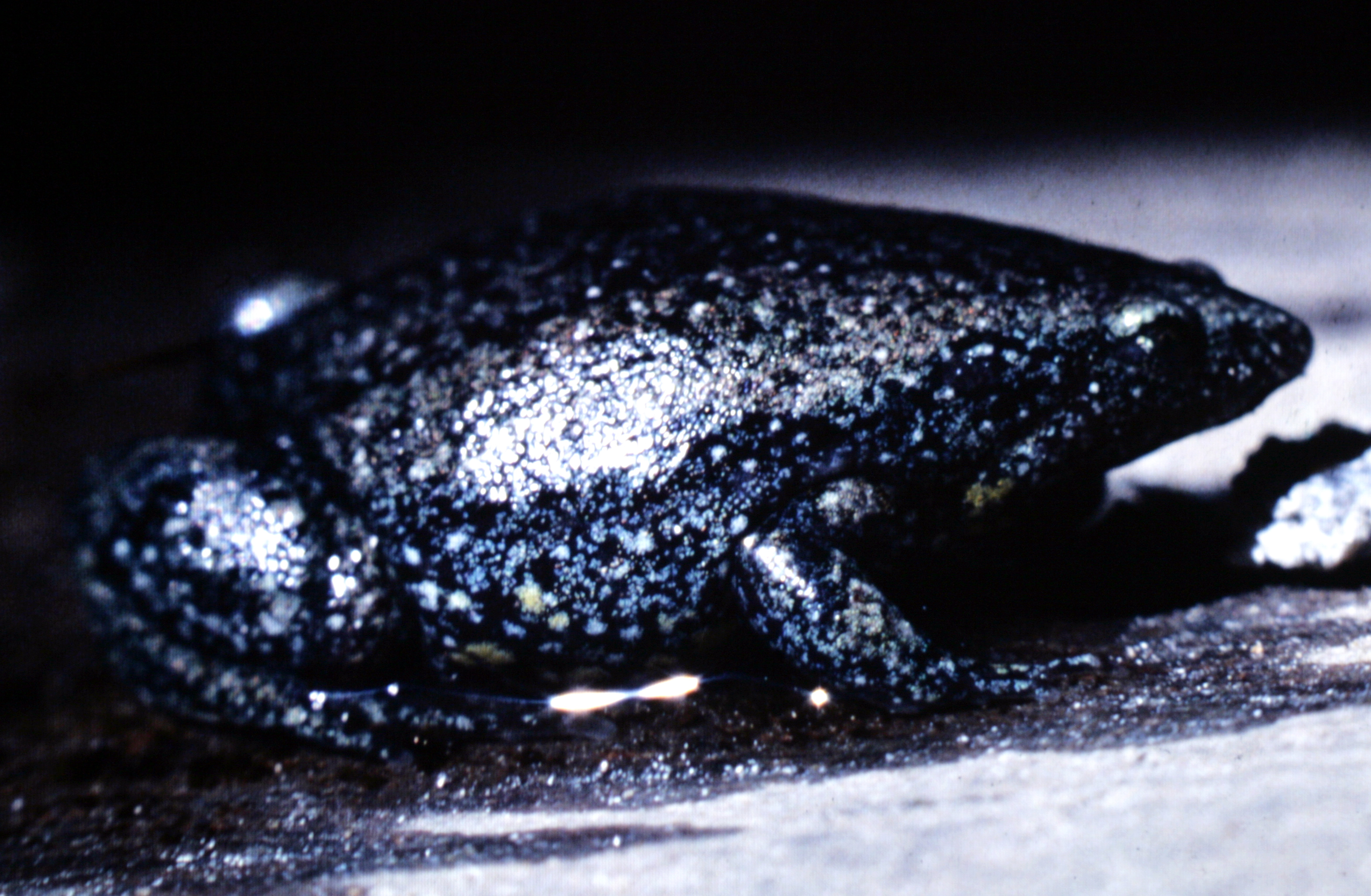
- Elachistocleis ovalis

Conservation status
- Least Concern (IUCN 3.1)

Scientific classification
- Kingdom: Animalia
- Phylum: Chordata
- Class: Amphibia
- Order: Anura
- Family: Microhylidae
- Genus: Elachistocleis
- Species: E. ovalis

Binomial name
- Elachistocleis ovalis (Schneider, 1799)

Synonyms
- Rana ovalis Schneider, 1799

= Elachistocleis ovalis =

Species of frog

Elachistocleis ovalis, commonly known as the common oval frog, is a dubious species of frog in the family Microhylidae. The type species of Elachistocleis, it was described without a holotype or type locality, and due to this it is not known exactly to which population the name Elachistocleis ovalis applies, making it a nomen nudum. The Amphibian Species of the World restricts this species to Panama, Colombia, Trinidad and Tobago, and Bolivia. Frog species from Brazil have been allocated to other species. A 2021 study found all populations assigned to E. ovalis across South America to represent several different undescribed species, likely indicating that the name E. ovalis is invalid without knowledge of the original population.

Populations assigned to Elachistocleis ovalis live in leaf litter and in tree holes in tropical rainforests and on the forest edges, grasslands, and shrublands. They breed in ponds where eggs and larvae develop.
