= Heterocope =

Scientific classification
- Kingdom: Animalia
- Phylum: Arthropoda
- Clade: Pancrustacea
- Class: Copepoda
- Order: Calanoida
- Family: Temoridae
- Genus: Heterocope; Sars G.O., 1863

Type species
- Heterocope appendiculata Sars G.O., 1863

Genus of crustaceans

Heterocope is a genus of copepods in the family Temoridae. It was described by Norwegian biologist Georg Ossian Sars in 1863. Members of the genus are found in marine and freshwater environments.

== Species ==
The World Register of Marine Species lists the following currently accepted species:

- Heterocope appendiculata Sars G.O., 1863 (type by original designation)
- Heterocope borealis (Fischer, 1851)
- Heterocope caspia Sars G.O., 1897
- Heterocope septentrionalis Juday & Muttkowski, 1915
- Heterocope saliens (Lilljeborg, 1863)
- Heterocope soldatovi Rylov, 1922

Additionally, the following previously considered species are now seen as synonyms of other Heterocope species:

- Heterocope alpina Sars G.O., 1863 (accepted as immature offspring of H. saliens)
- Heterocope robusta Sars G.O., 1863 (accepted as H. saliens)
- Heterocope romana Imhof, 1888 (accepted as H. saliens)
- Heterocope weismanni Imhof, 1890 (accepted as H. borealis)
