= Wilhelm Giesbrecht =

Prussian zoologist (1854–1913)

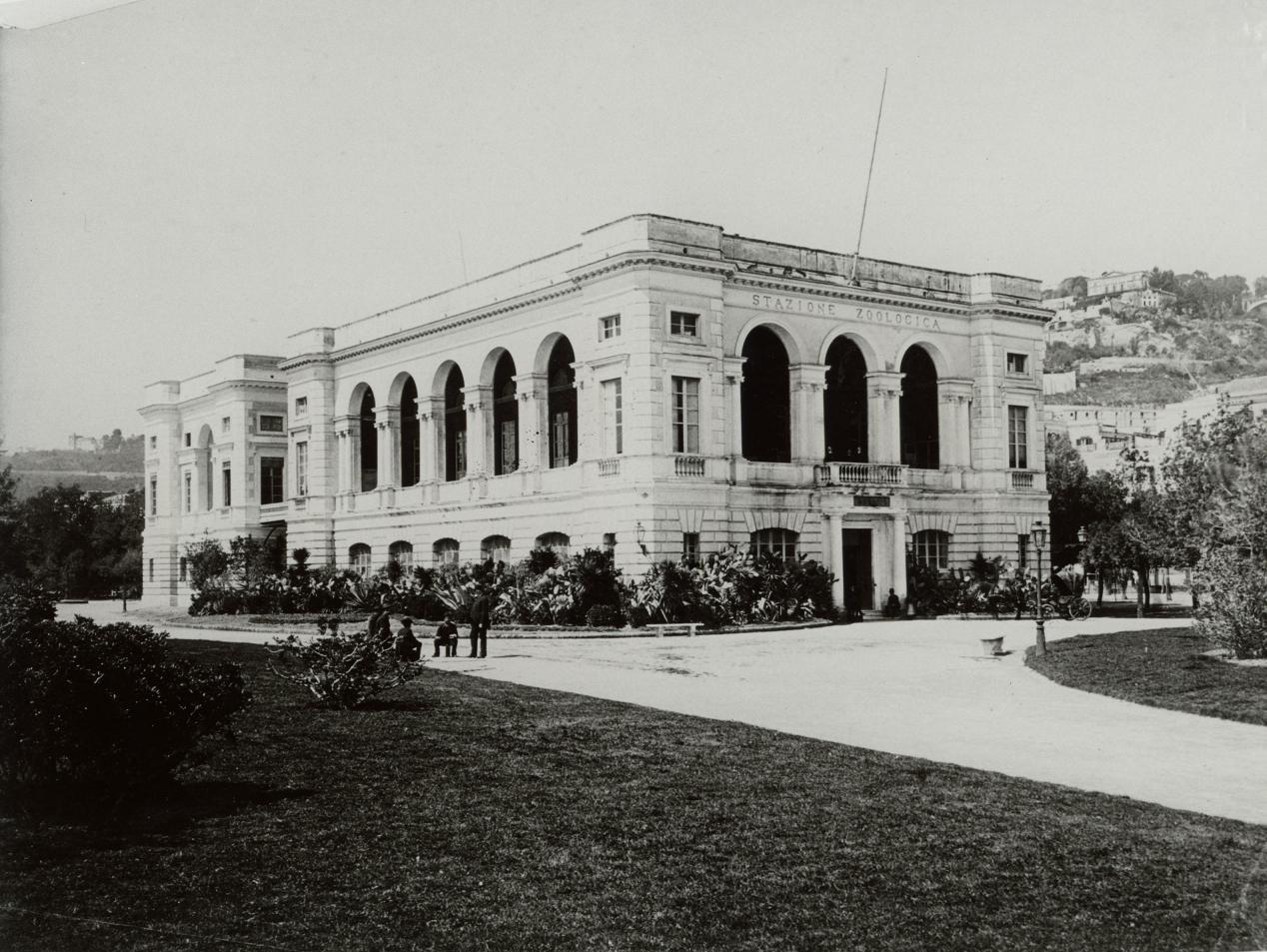
The Neapolitan Stazione Zoologica, Giesbrecht's main work place

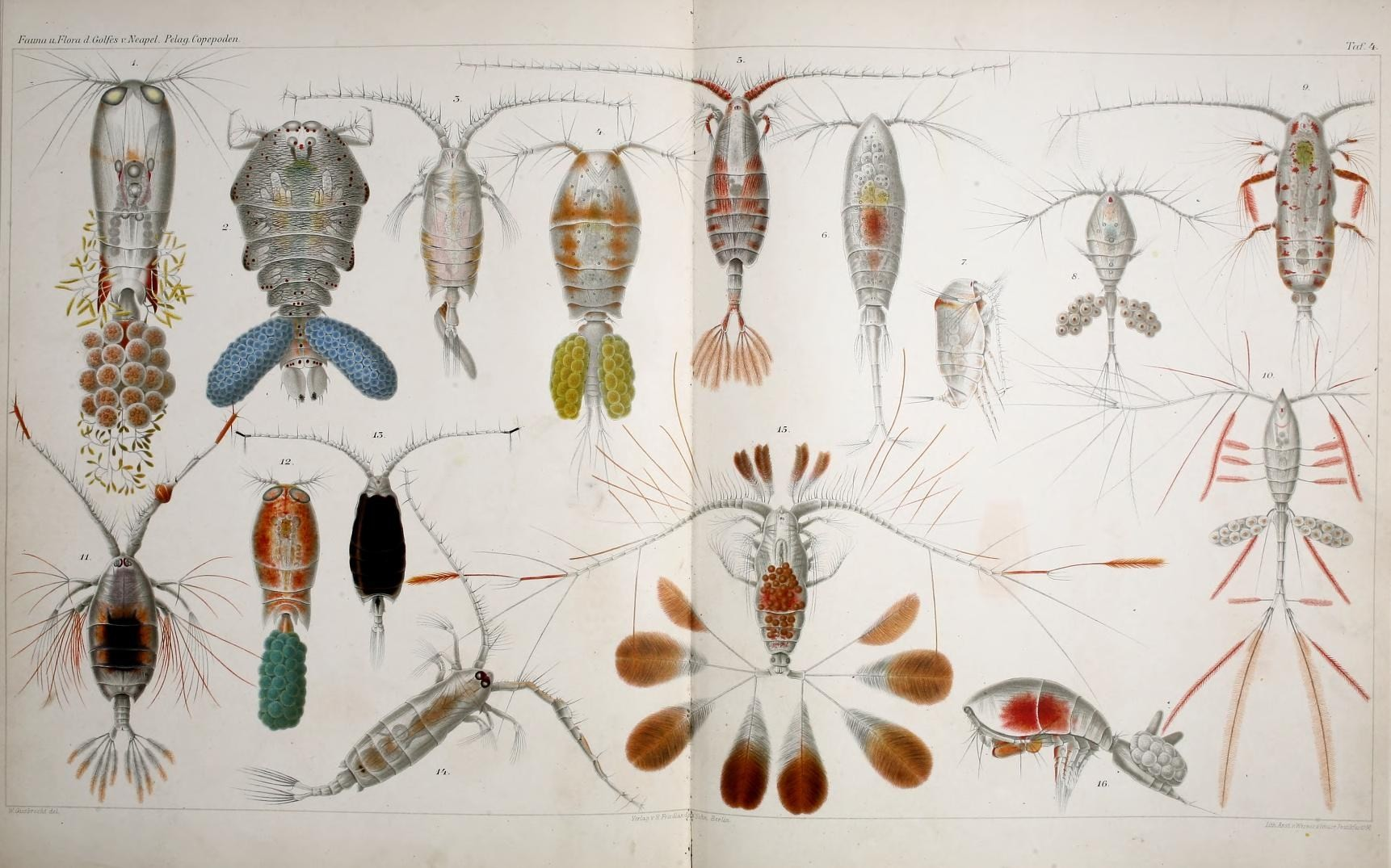
A plate from Systematik und Faunistik der pelagischen Copepoden des Golfes von Neapel und der angrenzenden Meeres-Abschnitte

Wilhelm Giesbrecht (1854–1913) was a Prussian zoologist, specialising in copepods, during the "golden age of copepodology".

Giesbrecht was born in Gdańsk in 1854, and was educated in Kiel, where in 1881 he earned a Ph.D. in Baltic copepods under Professor Karl Möbius. He then moved to Naples to work at the zoological station there, staying there for the remainder of his life. His most famous work is the 1892 monograph Systematik und Faunistik der pelagischen Copepoden des Golfes von Neapel und der angrenzenden Meeres-Abschnitte ("Systematics and faunistics of the pelagic copepods of the Gulf of Naples and neighbouring seas"). In 1904, at the request of Anton Dohrn, Giesbrecht was made an honorary professor. He is commemorated in a number of species names:

- Prostheceraeus giesbrechtii Lang, 1884
- Buntonia giesbrechti (G. W. Müller, 1894)
- Onchocorycaeus giesbrechti (F. Dahl, 1894)
- Stenhelia giesbrechti T. & A. Scott, 1896
- Pseudocyclopia giesbrechti Wolfenden, 1902
- Xanthocalanus giesbrechti I. C. Thompson, 1903
- Aetideus giesbrechti (Cleve, 1904)
- Arietellus giesbrechti G. O. Sars, 1905
- Conchoecetta giesbrechti (G. W. Müller, 1906)
- Paramphiascopsis giesbrechti (G. O. Sars, 1906)
- Harpacticus giesbrechti Klie, 1927
- Pseudoclausia giesbrechti Bocquet & Stock, 1960
- Candacia giesbrechti Grice & Lawson, 1977
- Schoenocaulon ghiesbreghtii Greenman, Proc. Amer. Acad. Arts. 43: 20. 1907

Link to a Wilhelm Giesbrecht image gallery with examples of his illustrations of copepods

http://gallery.obs-vlfr.fr/gallery2/v/Aquaparadox/album319/
