= Eurytemora affinis =

Species of crustacean

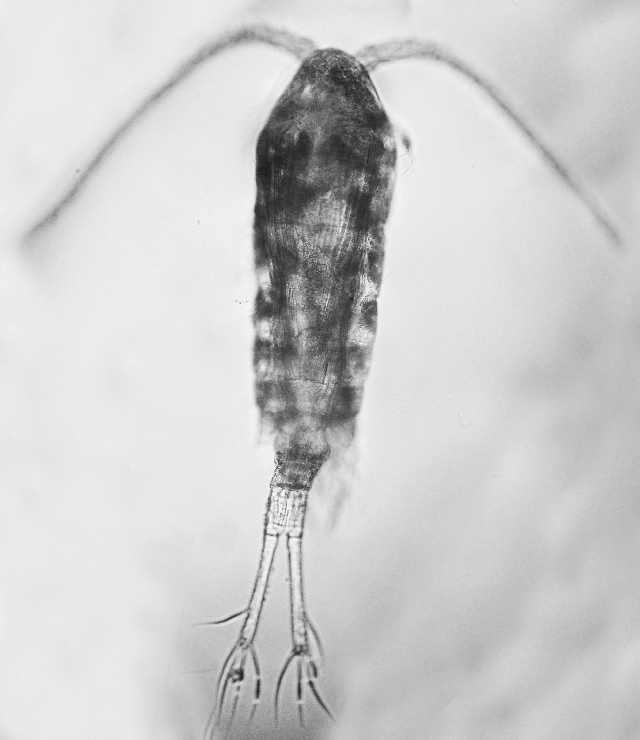
Eurytemora affinis

Eurytemora affinis is a calanoid copepod in the family Temoridae.

Eurytemora affinis refers to either the Eurytemora affinis species complex, the entire species complex, or E. affinis proper, the Europe clade of the species complex. The E. affinis species complex is composed of at least eight genetically distinct clades (sibling species), several of which have been found to vary in chromosome number. E. affinis complex is considered a cryptic species complex, given the relative lack of morphological divergence among clades, despite large differences in genome architecture among the clades and physiological diversity among the populations.

Populations of this species complex are commonly found in brackish lakes and estuaries and hypersaline salt marshes, as well as recently invaded coastal and inland freshwater lakes and reservoirs. Adults are on average ca. 1.0 - 2.0 mm in length and feed primarily on phytoplankton/algae as well as detritus and free floating ciliates. Populations of the E. affinis complex, like many other copepods, are a major food source for secondary consumers, such larval and forage fish, and support lower trophic levels of many food webs.

The E. affinis species complex has been used as a model system in many genetic, evolutionary, and physiological studies.

== Morphological Characteristics ==
Eurytemora affinis species complex is marked by morphological stasis, with only subtle morphological differences among clades. Adult individuals of E. affinis complex are typically 1.0 - 2.0 mm in length, where the females are typically ca. 1.1-2.0 mm and males 1.0-1.5 mm in length. As in other calanoid copepods, their anatomy consists of two main sections: the prosome (main body) and urosome (tail).

Adult females possess comparatively short and curved antennae relative to other calanoid copepods, such as Acartia tonsa, which have longer and straighter antennae. In adult females of E. affinis complex, the last prosomal segment has a pair of large angular projections (wings). The males are smaller and more slender than the females and lack the "wings." The male antennae are asymmetric in shape, with the right antenna being much thicker, jointed (geniculate), and grasping.

== Life History/ Reproduction ==
Eurytemora affinis complex individuals have the capacity to live up to ca. 73 days, with the copepodid stages occurring for roughly 11–37 days of the 73.. Generation time (hatching to reproduction) ranges from 20 - 30 days.

E. affinis complex females can produce either subitaneous or diapause eggs. Subitaneous eggs are typically produced under favorable environmental conditions and hatch within a few days after spawning. On the other hand, diapause eggs are produced when environmental conditions are not suitable for the copepod. The diapause eggs will typically hatch after a refractory phase and when conditions are favorable. The primary cue for dormancy in the resting diapause eggs is temperature and photoperiod.

In some locations, E. affinis complex females will produce different type of eggs in different seasons. For instance, in Lake Ohnuma, Hokkaido, Japan, females (from the Asia clade) that were collected from May through October produced solely subitaneous eggs, whereas those collected during late autumn produced solely diapause eggs.

The diapause eggs are highly resilient over long periods of time and can survive under severe conditions, such as in the digestive tract of fish. In a study performed in 1994, E. affinis proper (Europe clade) females that were carrying eggs were fed to threespine stickleback fish. After the fish had digested the female copepods and excreted them 24 hours later, nauplii were found hatching from the feces. In addition, eggs that had been removed from a sediment core in 1996 from the Baltic Sea contained viable eggs that were 10–13 years old, some even possibly 18–19 years old.

== Distribution ==
Populations of the Eurytemora affinis species complex are natively distributed across the Northern Hemisphere, along the Pacific and Atlantic coasts of North America and the Gulf of Mexico, the western European coast and Baltic Sea, some areas in Asia, and the Ponto-Caspian region.

The E. affinis species complex is composed of at least eight genetically/genomically distinct clades, including the Atlantic clade (E. carolleeae, n = 4 chromosomes), the North Atlantic clade, the Gulf clade (E. gulfia, n = 7 chromosomes), the North Pacific clade, the Asia clades (E. caspica; Hokkaido clades), and the Europe clade (E. affinis proper, n = 15 chromosomes). In four of the clades (Atlantic, Gulf, Europe, Asia), saline populations have invaded freshwater habitats on short time scales (within decades). These saline to freshwater invasions were accompanied by rapid genomic signatures of natural selection and physiological evolution. For example, the Atlantic clade (E. carolleeae), originally from the St. Lawrence estuary, was first observed in Lake Ontario in 1958, in Lake Erie in 1962, and then in all of the Great Lakes by the 1970s. The freshwater populations in the Great Lakes evolved greater freshwater tolerance relative to their saline ancestor, along with the evolution of increased ion pumping activity and greater expression of certain ion transporters. In contrast, the North Atlantic clade, which also co-occurs with the Atlantic clade in the St. Lawrence estuary, has never invaded the Great Lakes or any other freshwater habitat.

Eurytemora carolleeae, Atlantic clade of the E. affinis species complex (photo by Violet Krol, 2026)

== Evolution and Genomics ==
In Eurytemora affinis complex populations, rapid evolutionary shifts have been demonstrated to occur during salinity transitions, including genome-wide evolutionary shifts in gene expression and allele frequency shifts, evolution of physiological tolerance and performance, as well as evolutionary shifts in ion transporter localization, expression, and function.

The ancestral genome of E. affinis complex likely consisted of 21 chromosomes. The Europe clade (E. affinis proper)-like ancestral genome of 15 chromosomes likely fused independently into 4 chromosomes in the Atlantic clade (E. carolleeae) genome and 7 chromosomes in the Gulf clade (E. gulfia) genome.

The genomes of the E. affinis complex exhibit massive expansions of ion transporter gene families. Certain gene paralogs of these ion transporter gene families are repeatedly the targets of natural selection during salinity transitions. The genetic loci under natural selection during salinity change tend to be enriched at the chromosomal fusion sites in the Atlantic clade and Gulf clade genomes.

== Feeding ==
Eurytemora affinis complex populations graze predominantly on phytoplankton, ciliates, and detritus suspended in the water column. The freshwater invading populations of E. affinis complex are heavily dependent on cryptophyte algae to persist in freshwater habitats. In some locations, E. affinis complex populations form large blooms during the spring/early summer, following phytoplankton blooms arising from warmer temperatures and more UV light. These copepod blooms for sustaining many fisheries.
