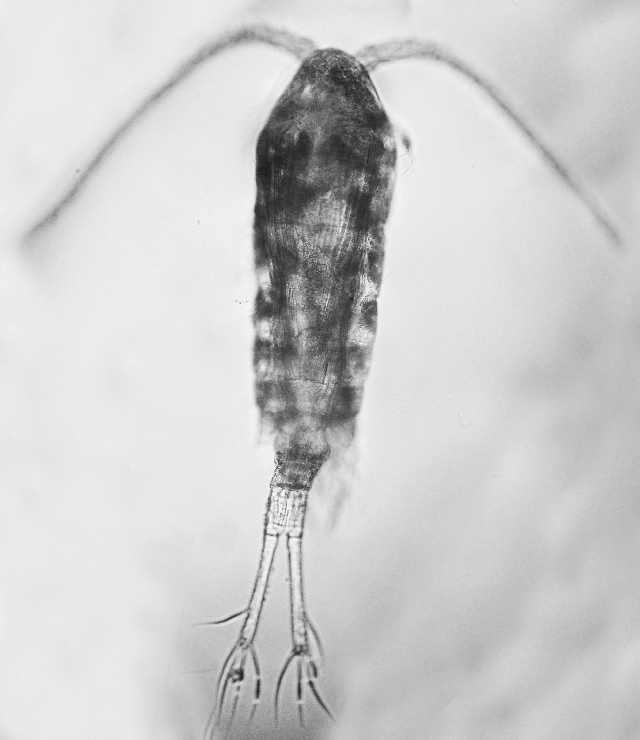
- A specimen of Eurytemora affinis.

Scientific classification
- Kingdom: Animalia
- Phylum: Arthropoda
- Clade: Pancrustacea
- Class: Copepoda
- Order: Calanoida
- Family: Temoridae; Giesbrecht, 1893

= Temoridae =

Family of crustaceans

Temoridae is a family of copepods, containing the following genera:

- Epischura S. A. Forbes, 1882
- Epischurella Smirnov, 1936
- Eurytemora Giesbrecht, 1881
- Ganchosia Oliveira, 1946
- Heterocope G. O. Sars, 1863
- Lahmeyeria Oliveira, 1946
- Temora Baird, 1850
