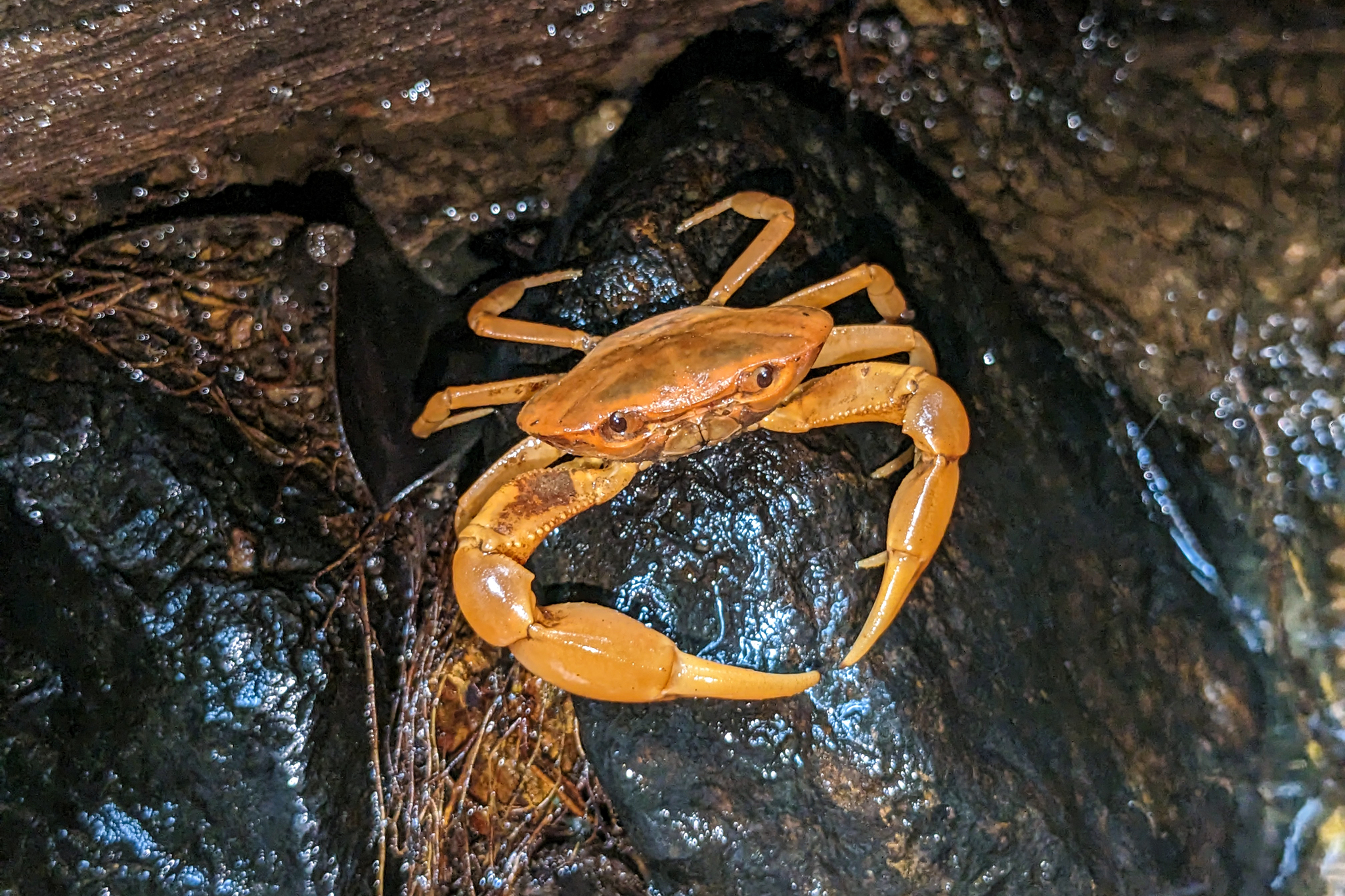

Scientific classification
- Domain: Eukaryota
- Kingdom: Animalia
- Phylum: Arthropoda
- Class: Malacostraca
- Order: Decapoda
- Suborder: Pleocyemata
- Infraorder: Brachyura
- Family: Pseudothelphusidae
- Genus: Microthelphusa; Pretzmann, 1968

= Microthelphusa =

Genus of crabs

Microthelphusa is a genus of crabs in the family Pseudothelphusidae, containing the following species:

- Microthelphusa aracamuniensis Suárez, 2015
- Microthelphusa barinensis Rodríguez, 1980
- Microthelphusa bolivari Rodríguez, 1980
- Microthelphusa forcarti (Pretzmann, 1967)
- Microthelphusa furcifer Pedraza & Tavares, 2014
- Microthelphusa ginesi Rodríguez & Esteves, 1972
- Microthelphusa guaiquinimaensis Suárez, 2015
- Microthelphusa lipkei Magalhães, 2010
- Microthelphusa maigualidaensis Suárez, 2015
- Microthelphusa marahuacaensis Suárez, 2015
- Microthelphusa meansi Cumberlidge, 2007
- Microthelphusa odaelkae (Bott, 1970)
- Microthelphusa racenisi (Rodríguez, 1966)
- Microthelphusa rodriguezi (Pretzmann, 1968)
- Microthelphusa roraimaensis Suárez, 2015
- Microthelphusa somanni (Bott, 1967)
- Microthelphusa sucreensis Rodríguez & Campos, 2000
- Microthelphusa turumikiri Rodríguez, 1980
- Microthelphusa viloriai Suárez, 2006
- Microthelphusa wymani (Rathbun, 1905)
