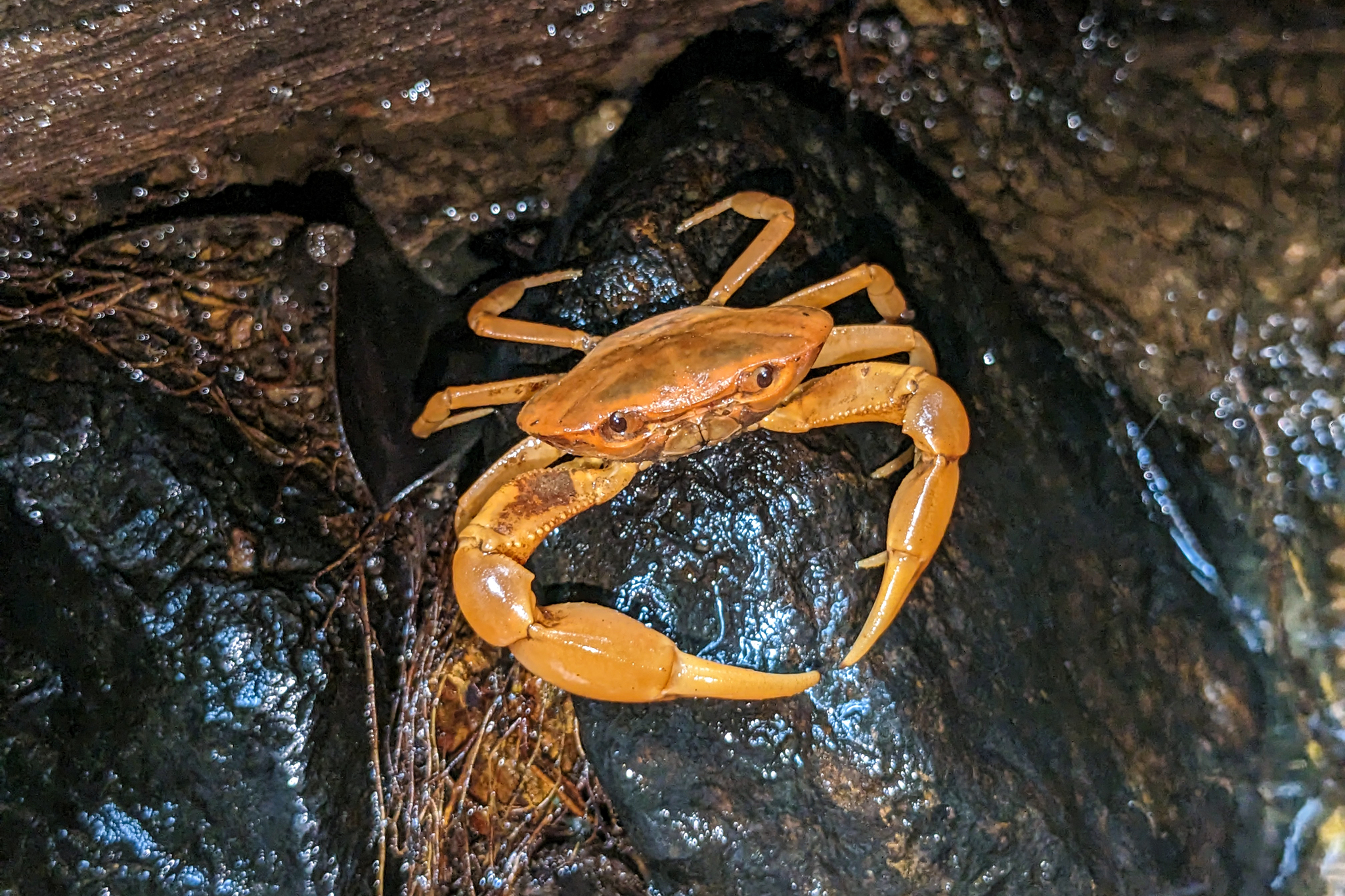

Scientific classification
- Domain: Eukaryota
- Kingdom: Animalia
- Phylum: Arthropoda
- Class: Malacostraca
- Order: Decapoda
- Suborder: Pleocyemata
- Infraorder: Brachyura
- Family: Pseudothelphusidae
- Genus: Microthelphusa
- Species: M. wymani

Binomial name
- Microthelphusa wymani (Rathbun, 1905)
- Distribution Native range

= Microthelphusa wymani =

Species of crustacean

Microthelphusa wymani is a species of crab in the family Pseudothelphusidae.

== Similar species ==
Microthelphusa wymani is morphologically similar to both M. meansi and M. somanni.
