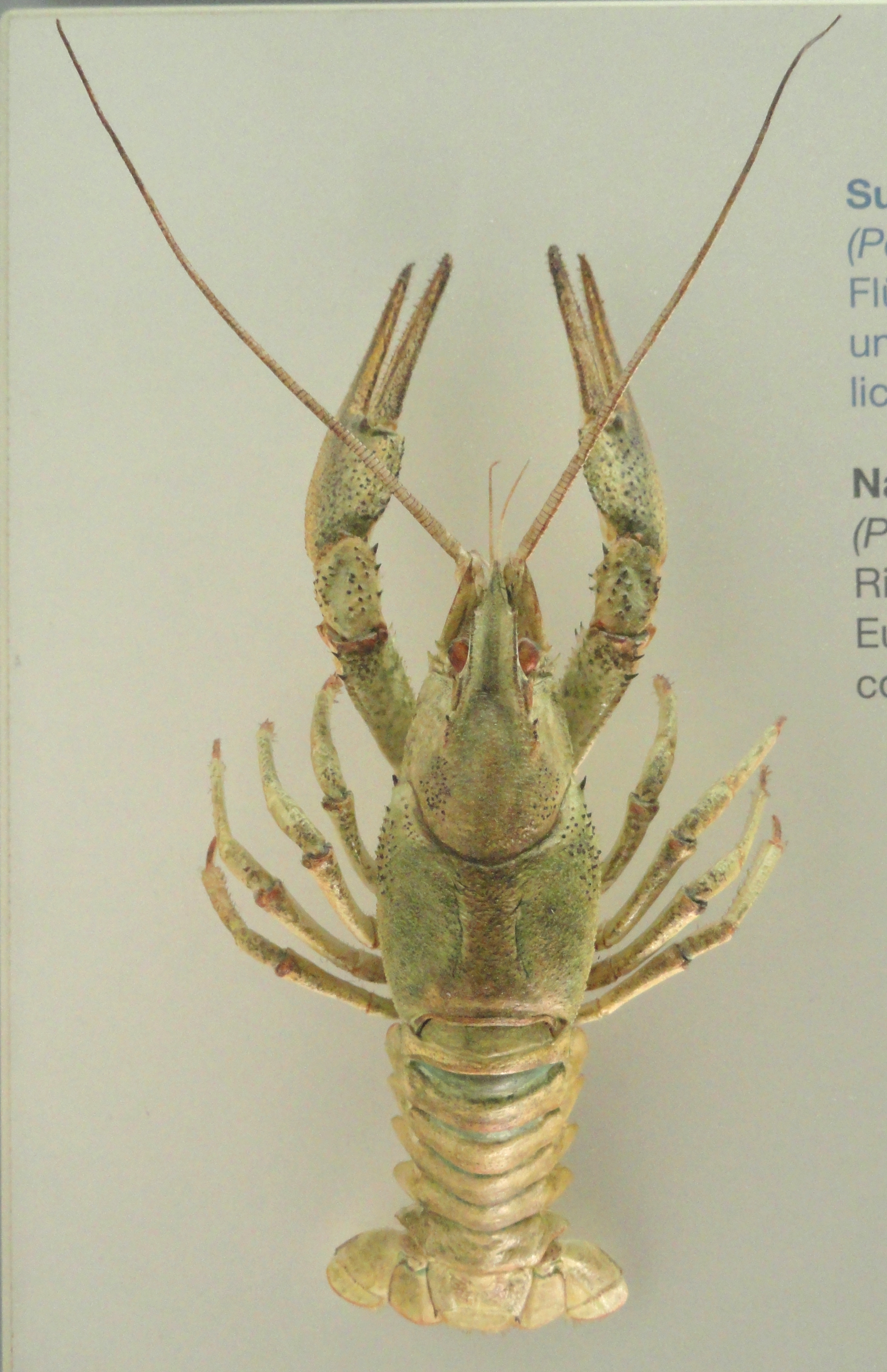
- Pontastacus leptodactylus (museum specimen)

Scientific classification
- Kingdom: Animalia
- Phylum: Arthropoda
- Clade: Pancrustacea
- Class: Malacostraca
- Order: Decapoda
- Suborder: Pleocyemata
- Infraorder: Astacidea
- Superfamily: Astacoidea
- Family: Astacidae
- Genus: Pontastacus; Bott, 1950

Species
- See text

Synonyms
- Astacus (Pontastacus) Bott, 1950; Caspiastacus Starobogatov, 1996

= Pontastacus =

Genus of crayfishes

Pontastacus is a genus of freshwater crayfish native to eastern Europe and western Asia, but also introduced elsewhere.

== Classification and phylogeny ==
Pontastacus belongs to the family Astacidae, one of the three families of Northern Hemisphere freshwater crayfish within the superfamily Astacoidea. The internal phylogeny of Astacidae can be shown in the cladogram below:

- Astacidae
  - Pacifastacus
  - - - Astacus
      - Pontastacus
    - Austropotamobius

=== Species ===
Nine species are recognized:

  - Pontastacus cubanicus (Birstein & Vinogradov, 1934) - Black Sea, Russia
  - Pontastacus danubialis Brodsky, 1981 - Danube Delta lakes, Ukraine
  - Pontastacus daucinus Brodsky, 1981 - Danube Delta lakes, Ukraine and Moldova
  - Pontastacus eichwaldi (Bott, 1950) - Caspian Sea
  - Pontastacus kessleri (Schimkewitsch, 1886) - Turkestan
  - Pontastacus leptodactylus (Eschscholtz, 1823) - around the Black Sea and other aquatic systems in eastern Europe and Turkey; widely introduced elsewhere - "Turkish crayfish"
  - Pontastacus pachypus (Rathke, 1837) - Caspian Sea, Black Sea, Sea of Azov - "Caspian crayfish"
  - Pontastacus pylzowi (Skorikov, 1907) - eastern part of Transcaucasia
  - Pontastacus salinus (von Nordmann, 1842) - Black Sea
