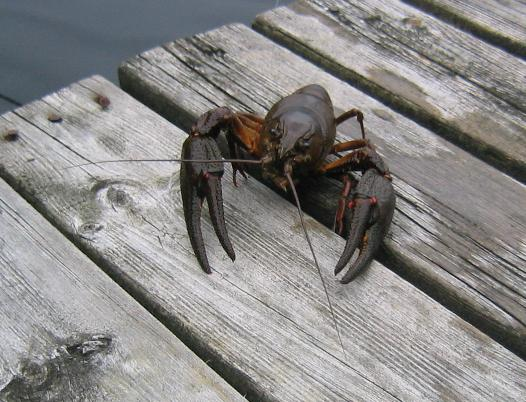
- Astacus astacus

Scientific classification
- Kingdom: Animalia
- Phylum: Arthropoda
- Clade: Pancrustacea
- Class: Malacostraca
- Order: Decapoda
- Suborder: Pleocyemata
- Family: Astacidae
- Genus: Astacus; Fabricius, 1775

Species
- Astacus astacus (Linnaeus, 1758); Astacus balcanicus (Karaman, 1929); Astacus colchicus Kessler, 1876; ?†Astacus edwardsii Van Straelen, 1928; †Astacus laevissimus Fritsch & Kafka, 1887; †Astacus multicavatus Bell, 1863

Synonyms
- † Astacus (Potamobius) Samoeulle, 1819 superseded rank; Cancer (Astacus) Fabricius, 1775 (status change); Carabis Marchand, Lamy & de Boisvillette, 1874 junior subjective synonym; Potamobius Samouelle, 1819 junior subjective synonym

= Astacus =

Genus of crayfishes

Astacus (from the Greek αστακός, astacós, meaning "lobster" or "crayfish") is a genus of crayfish found in Europe, comprising three extant (living) species and three somewhat contested extinct species. These crayfish are found across Europe and live exclusively in freshwater, mostly inhabiting the bottom of lakes, ponds, and streams.

Due to the crayfish plague, crayfish of this genus have declined in many European regions, being replaced by the invasive North American signal crayfish, which carries the plague but is unaffected by it.

== Classification ==
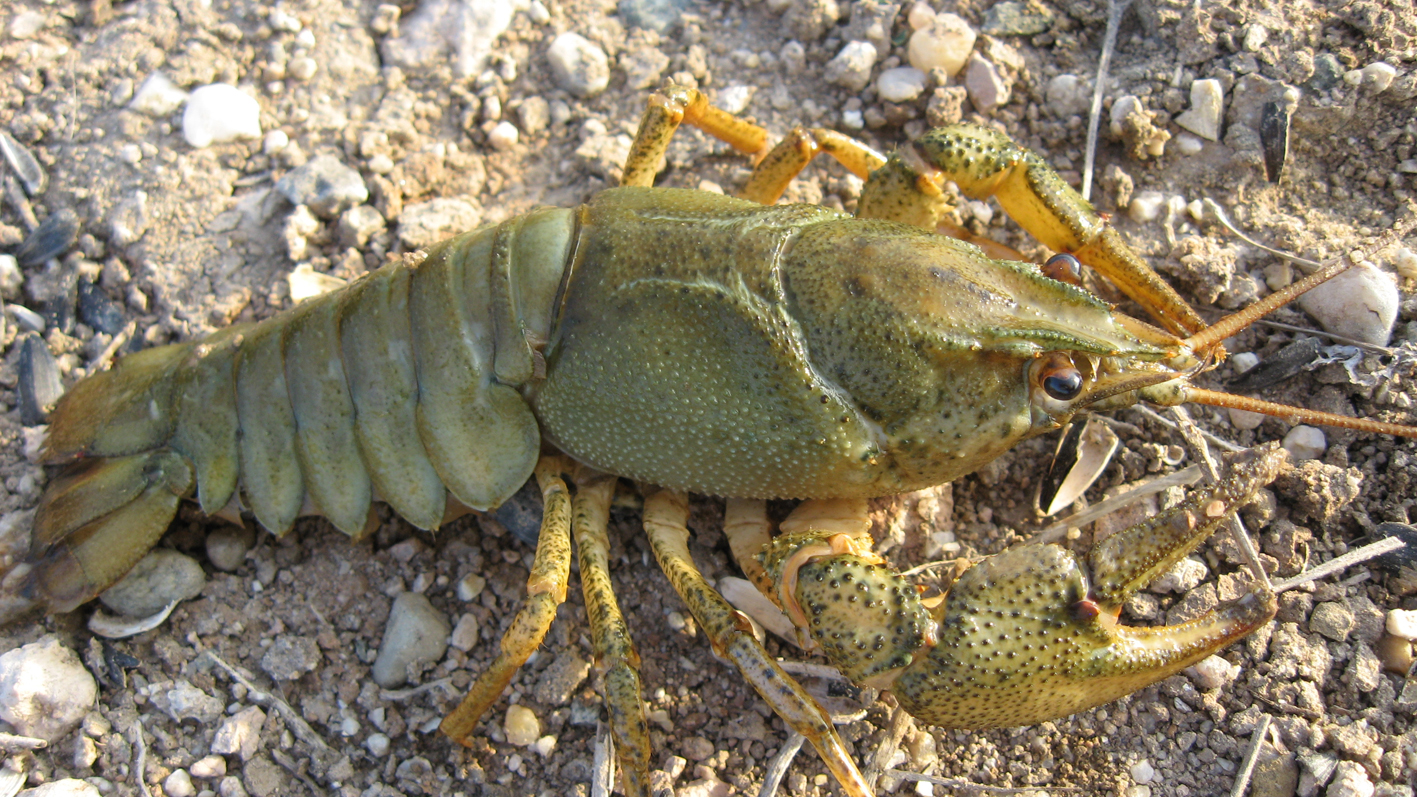
Astacus astacus

Astacus was the first named genus of freshwater crayfish, with many former species later being reassigned to other genera.

Astacus belongs to the family Astacidae, one of the three families of Northern Hemisphere freshwater crayfish within the superfamily Astacoidea. The internal phylogeny of Astacidae can be shown in the cladogram below:

- Astacidae
  - Pacifastacus
  - - - Astacus
      - Pontastacus
    - Austropotamobius

=== Extant species ===
- Astacus astacus (Linnaeus, 1775) - known as the "European crayfish", "noble crayfish" or "broad-fingered crayfish", it is the most well studied and widespread species of the genus. It is distributed across Europe, in France throughout Central Europe, to the Balkan Peninsula, and north as far as parts of the British Isles, Scandinavia, and the western parts of the former Soviet Union. It is the species of crayfish with the largest natural distribution in Europe, and a traditional foodstuff. Like other crayfish, A. astacus is restricted to fresh water, living only in unpolluted streams, rivers, and lakes. Males may grow up to 16 cm long, and females up to 12 cm.
- Astacus balcanicus (Karaman, 1929) - found in only three bodies of water: the Vardar river basin, Lake Pamvotida (Greece) and Lake Ohrid (North Macedonia/eastern Albania). The separation from A. astacus likely occurred due to Pleistocene glaciations as well as human impacts such as pollution or translocation of species.
- Astacus colchicus Kessler, 1876 - can be found in Rioni river basin (Georgia). There is a high degree of morphological similarity between Astacus astacus and Astacus colchius, but molecular studies of the two species indicate that phylogenetic differences are present.

=== Fossil species ===
- ?†Astacus edwardsii Van Straelen, 1928 - identified in 1932 from a plaster cast of a now destroyed holotype fossil that was discovered in France. Although initially being classified as a member of the Astacus genus, a more recent 2021 study has shown that the specimen possessed traits that were not seen anywhere else in the genus. Thus the new genus Emplastron was erected within the family Astacidae, and the species was reassigned as Emplastron edwardsii.
- †Astacus laevissimus Fritsch & Kafka, 1887 - discovered in 1887 in the Czech Republic. The specimen has recently fallen under scrutiny due to the fact that the fossil was found in marine sediment. This has caused researchers to believe that the A. laevissimus fossil is likely a marine lobster rather than a crayfish. The name Astacus laevissimus is mostly considered a nomen dubium, but an appropriate replacement has not been found due to poor fossil records.
- †Astacus multicavatus Bell, 1863 - first identified from a fossil found in marine sediment in 1863 in the United Kingdom. The fossil was placed within the genus Astacus based on initial visual analysis, but further research suggests that it is likely not a member of this genus. The fossil has been more accurately classified as a marine lobster within the Erymidae family.

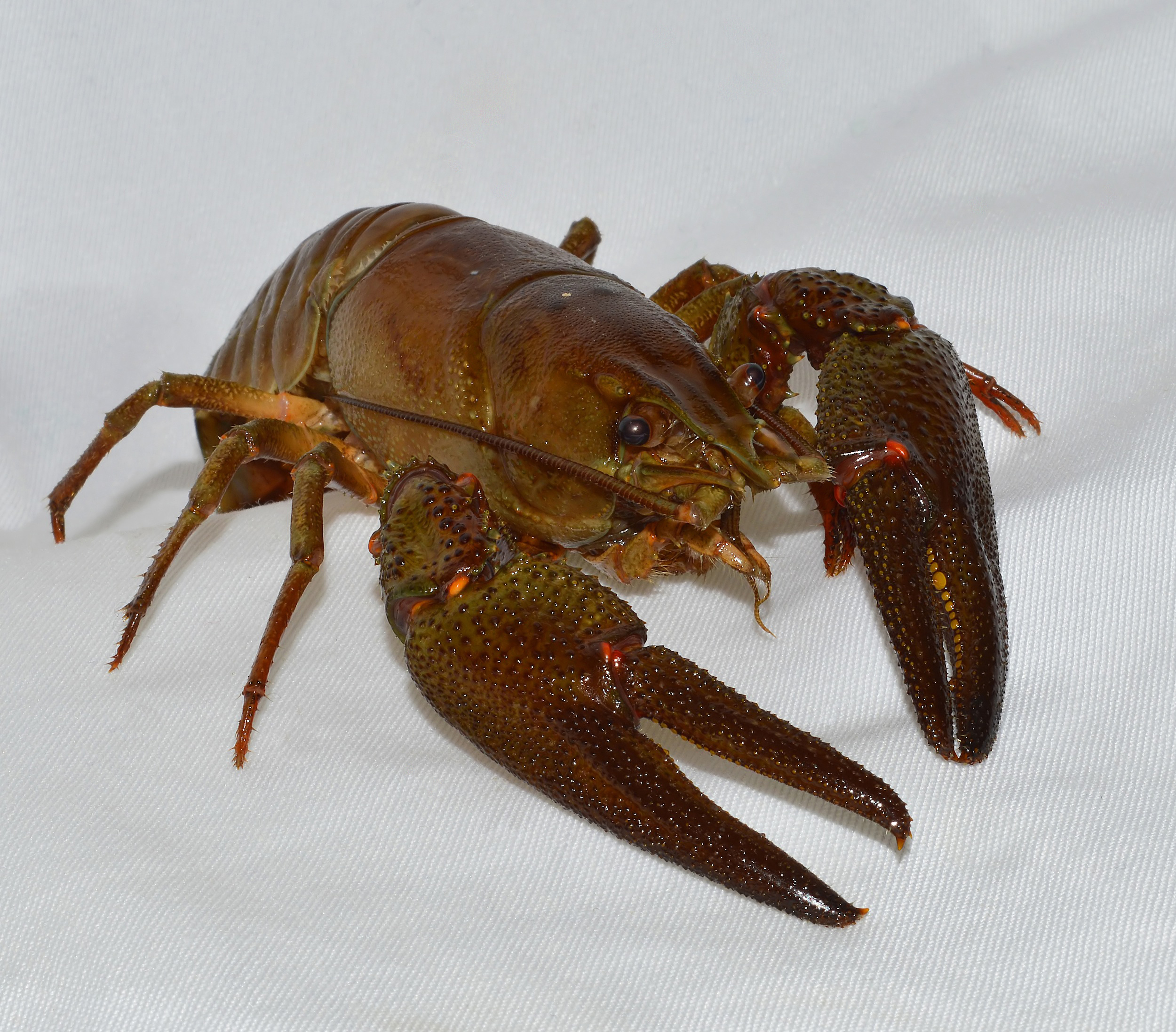
An adult A. astacus showing dark colouring as camouflage

== Description ==
"A. astacus have a dark brown or black coloration on their dorsal side, and an olive-brown or reddish-brown coloration on their ventral side. Their carapace is smooth, with small granular tubercles along the edges. The rostrum is flat and has two spines near its base. The claws are broad with well-defined bases, reddish-brown on the ventral side, and rough on the dorsal side."

== Ecology ==
They have been found to span the entire continent and prefer temperate water ranging from 12°C to 20°C, but they are also able to survive during colder periods when temperatures are closer to freezing.

The genus has been known to eat almost anything, typically crawling along the bottom of a body of water searching for another meal. They can be defined as detritovores since they persist mostly on decaying plant matter as well as dead or dying animals. This unique diet makes these crayfish essential for maintaining clean and healthy waterways as they clear out decaying matter and consume fish that are affected by illness or disease.

As is the case with all arthropods/ecdysozoans, the genus Astacus must molt their cuticle layer in order to grow and develop.

=== Reproduction ===
The Astacus genus exhibits sexual dimorphism and external reproduction. Reproduction is heavily based on the environmental conditions such as temperature and photoperiod, when ideal conditions are met fertilization can occur. The male testis produce sperm which then passes through the vas deferens which packages the sperm into a spermatophore and then passes it through to the gonopods. The spermatophore is then released onto the ventral surface of a female who then takes it into their annulus ventralis (seminal receptacle). The spermatophore can then be stored for up to several months before ovulation occurs within the female when the desired conditions are met. Once ovulation is complete, a special gland on the female (Glair gland) secretes an enzyme that breaks down the spermatophore and releases the sperm across the ventral surface of the body. The eggs are then released through the gonopore and are subsequently fertilized by the sperm. Fertilized eggs are then kept under the female's pleopods and undergo centrolecithal cleavage until they have developed enough to be released as crayfish larvae.

Due to the similar nature of the Astacus species, it is not uncommon to see hybridization occur both in a lab environment as well as in the wild. Since they follow the same reproductive procedure and have considerable genetic similarities, the species can interbreed with varying levels of success. To date there are no known populations of hybrid Astacus crayfish as the process of hybridization often leads to non-viable or sterile offspring.

== Decline and conservation ==
The population of A. astacus has seen significant decline due to the crayfish plague, a water mold disease Aphanomyces astaci, carried by non-native signal crayfish, Pacifastacus leniusculus. The introduction of signal crayfish to compensate for economic losses furthered the species decline by furthering the spread of the plague. Additionally, human activities such as transporting crayfish between water bodies and using infected equipment have facilitated the further spread of the disease.

Some noble crayfish populations have developed partial resistance to the plague, surviving for longer than others. Researchers are hopeful that selective breeding programs could create new lineages of noble crayfish that are more resistant or immune to the plague. Current conservation efforts are focused on breeding and reintroducing A. astacus back into their native habitats.

== Economic significance ==
Historically, crayfish of the species Astacus have been known to hold economic significance as an object of trade dating back to Europe in the Middle Ages. Initially, Astacus was considered a delicacy, but as demand grew so did industrial harvesting of the crayfish in the nineteenth century.

A homeopathic remedy called Astacus Fluviatilis, is a tincture made from the whole animal. This remedy seems to be first described in the book Materia Medica by homeopath John Henry Clarke in 1902 and purported benefits are discussed.
