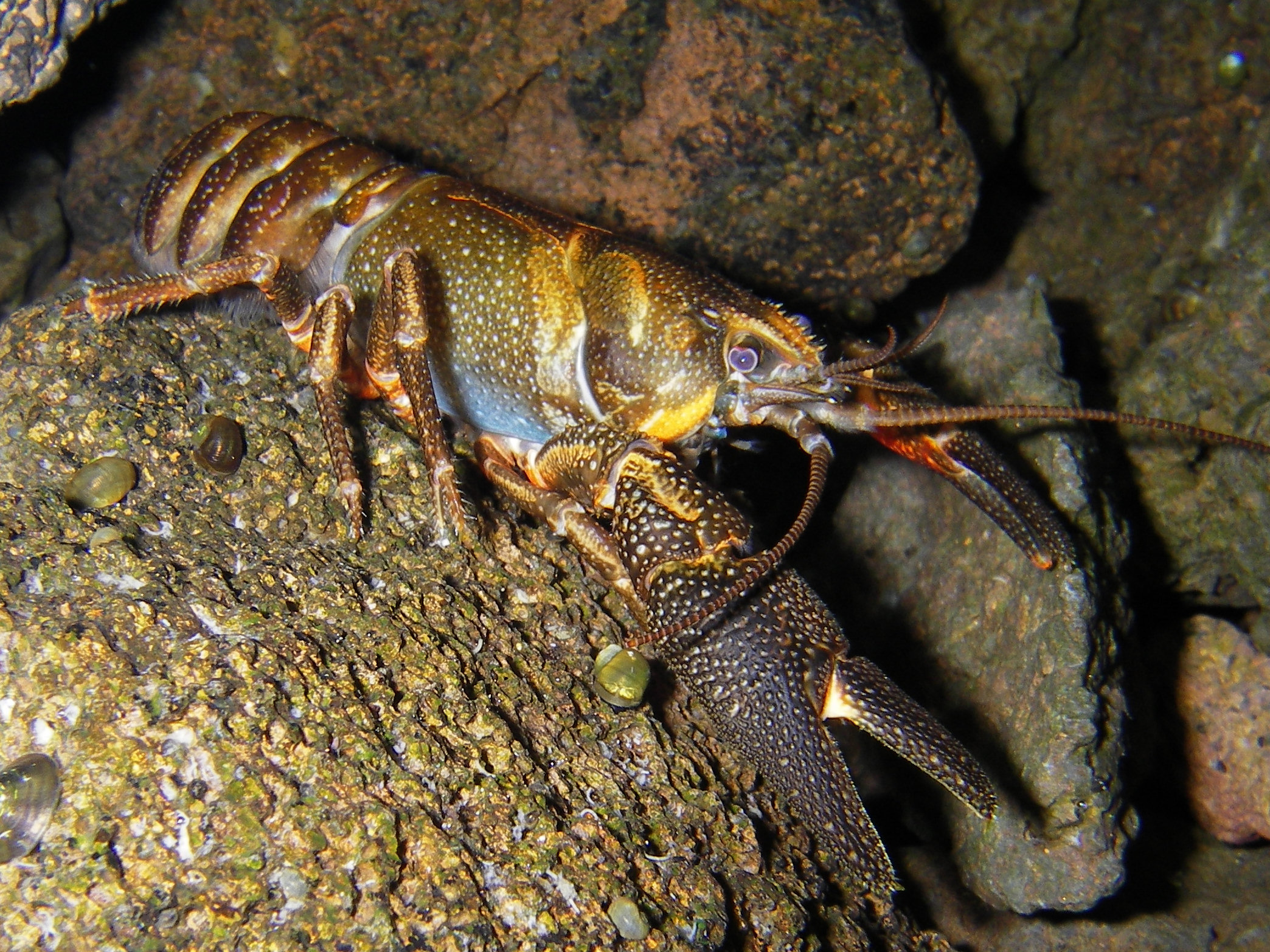

Conservation status
- Critically Endangered (IUCN 3.1)

- Endangered (ESA)

Scientific classification
- Kingdom: Animalia
- Phylum: Arthropoda
- Clade: Pancrustacea
- Class: Malacostraca
- Order: Decapoda
- Suborder: Pleocyemata
- Family: Astacidae
- Genus: Pacifastacus
- Species: P. fortis

Binomial name
- Pacifastacus fortis (Faxon, 1914)

= Pacifastacus fortis =

Species of crayfish

Pacifastacus fortis (known as the Shasta crayfish or placid crayfish) is an endangered crayfish species endemic to Shasta County, California, where it is found and first described in 1914, only in isolated spots along the Pit River and Fall River Mills. It is estimated that there are a total of roughly 4000 of the species still alive today. The exact subpopulations for the Shasta crayfish were discovered in 2004 through a genetic study that determined three different genetic clusters: Crystal Lake, the Big Lake group (which includes Big Lake Springs, JeShe, Lava, and Spring Creeks), and Thousand Springs.

== Description and ecology ==
P. fortis is thick and stocky, with relatively heavy chelae. It is usually dark brown dorsally with bright orange areas on its underside. These colors aid in camouflage in its habitat. It grows about 2-4 inches long. It lives in cold, clear, rocky areas of the mountain rivers, and feeds on microbes, algae, and small animals like snails. The animal requires a constant, steady, and untainted flow of fresh water to survive. P. fortis have 5 pairs of legs.

With regards to life span, P. fortis tends to endure a life span of between 10 and 15 years on average. Females meet their reproductive maturity at the age of five, and after which reproduce once per year. In October, females typically produce anywhere from 10 to 70 eggs per year, with the older more mature females producing the most eggs and the younger females producing at the lower end. By May, most eggs will have hatched and the babies stay attached to their mother for a short duration before separating and becoming a free-willed organism. P. fortis is nocturnal and remain idle behind cover for the majority of the day. They begin to leave their cover only when it is night and light is scarce. Furthermore, when possible, it prefers to live on its own without other members from its species.

Predators in California include but are not limited to various species of fish, such as the brown bullhead (Ameiurus nebulosus), Eurasian carp (Cyprinus carpio), and brown trout (Salmo trutta). Competitors include the signal crayfish (Pacifastacus leniusculus) and the smallmouth bass (Micropterus dolomieu).

== Causes of endangerment ==
Pacifastacus fortis is listed as a critically endangered species on the IUCN Red List, and an endangered species under the Endangered Species Act. Numerous factors play a role in the endangerment of P. fortis. Within California, some minor factors include but are not limited to illness and invasive predators. However, human intervention affects the species at a much greater proportion. Urbanization, pollution, and other forms of intervention often affect the surroundings of P. fortis, ultimately resulting in significant habitat loss and consequently, a significant decrease in population.

It has always had a very small native range, and that range has been significantly fragmented by such human activities as damming, mining, and agriculture. The Pit River Fish Hatchery was closed to protect this species.

Other nonnative invasive crayfish species such as Pacifastacus leniusculus and Orconectes virilis, as well as water impoundment and diversion have contributed to the continuing decline of P. fortis. Chemicals from agriculture have also washed into streams, and groundwater has been pumped to the point of lowering the water table, further decreasing the numbers of P. fortis over the last three decades. Hydroelectric operations in the area have also contributed to habitat loss, destroying almost all of the preferred substrate of Pacifastacus fortis.

Its decline mimics that of its closest relative, the Pacifastacus nigrescens crayfish, whose similar habitat loss and aggression from invasive species led to its eventual extinction. Attempts at controlling or extirpating invasive species are very expensive and rarely succeed; reintroducing Pacifastacus fortis to California cost $4.5 million.

P. fortis is the only native crayfish remaining in California.

== Conservation efforts ==
The Shasta crayfish was designated as a rare species by California law in 1980 and an endangered species in 1988 both by the State of California and by the Federal Government. Throughout numerous 5-year species reviews from 1988 to 2013, this endangered classification has not changed. This stems from the fact that large numbers of government conservation programs have been relatively ineffective in delisting the species.

A significant challenge for Shasta crayfish conservation is that while researchers know what type of food Shasta crayfish consume, their exact nutritional requirements are unknown. This presents a significant challenge for long-term captive breeding programs. Furthermore, no critical habitat has been identified for this species. However, there is optimism that Rock Creek could serve as a future safe haven for the Shasta crayfish.

=== Relocation of Shasta crayfish to a new safe haven in Rock Creek ===
A 20-year inter-agency initiative led by the California Department of Fish and Wildlife (CDFW) found significant success in June 2019 as it relocated 28 Shasta crayfish to a rehabilitated section of Rock Creek, Shasta County. The goal of this conservation effort was to create an isolated population of Shasta crayfish that was inaccessible to the invasive signal crayfish which currently outcompetes the native species for food while also contributing to the decline of fertility in the Shasta due to interbreeding between the species.

As a result, this large-scale project necessitated considerable habitat modifications, such as riparian plantings and rock clusters. Likewise, a pipeline from CDFW's hatchery at Crystal Lake had to be rerouted, and an upstream diversion dam had to be removed. The Hatchery's location is optimal since it prevents signal crayfish from migrating upstream and invading Rock Creek.

This restoration project was completed in collaboration with the Pacific Gas and Electric Company (PG&E), the United States Fish and Wildlife Service, CDFW, and the consulting firm Spring Rivers Ecological Sciences LLC. Today, the formerly dry portion of Rock Creek flows with around 0.6 miles of cool, clear water: a suitable habitat for the Shasta crayfish.

After completing the Rock Creek restoration, scuba divers gathered Shasta crayfish from the bottom of Crystal Lake for relocation. Crystal Lake was chosen because it contains a genetically diverse and viable population of Shasta crayfish that is most accessible to the CDFW. Following a 42-day quarantine, the divers relocated the crayfish to their new home in Rock Creek.

In the long term, the progress of these crayfish will be monitored closely by the CDFW with the hope that the population can sustainably grow without intervention.
