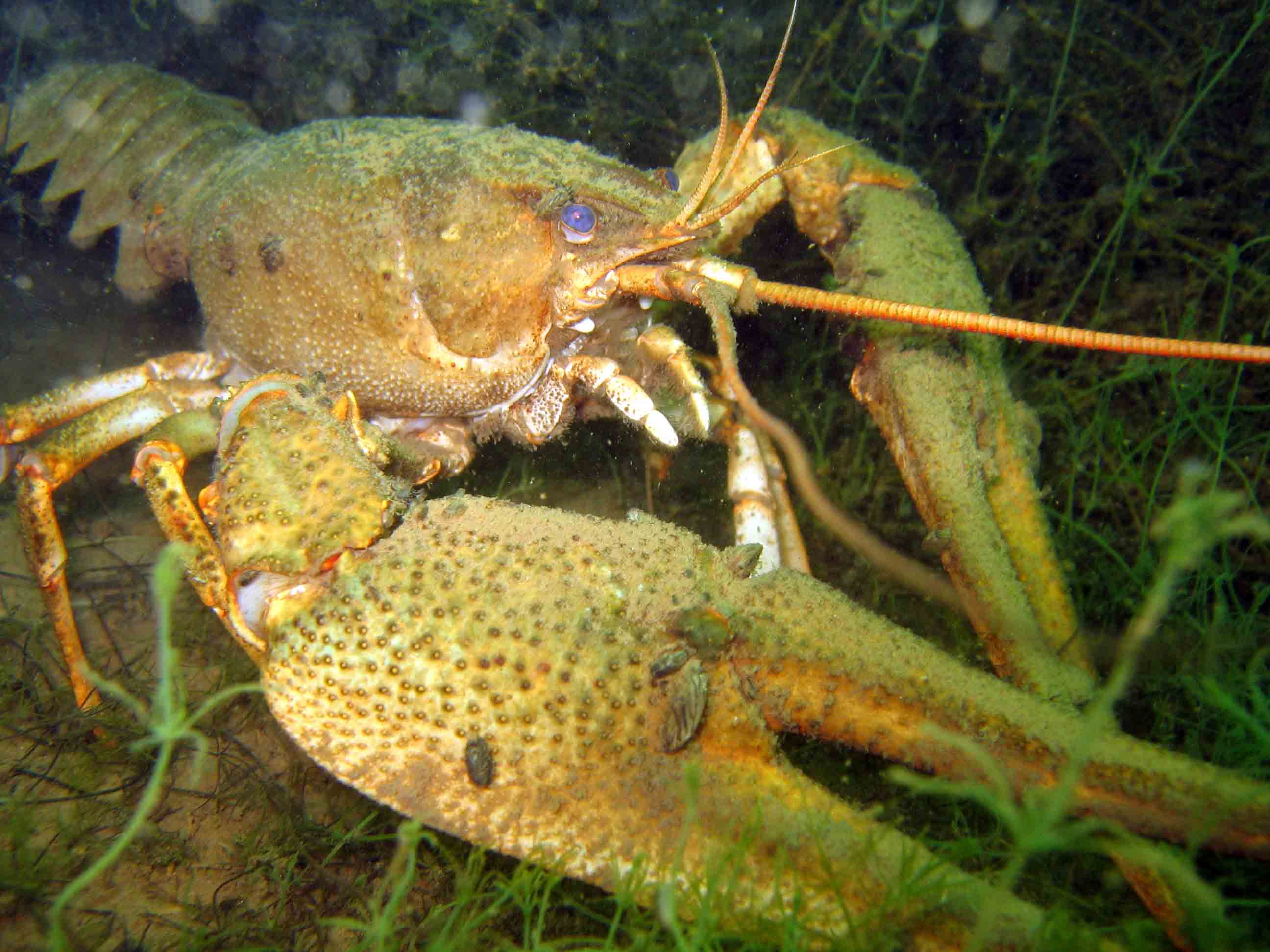

Conservation status
- Least Concern (IUCN 3.1)

Scientific classification
- Kingdom: Animalia
- Phylum: Arthropoda
- Clade: Pancrustacea
- Class: Malacostraca
- Order: Decapoda
- Suborder: Pleocyemata
- Family: Astacidae
- Genus: Pontastacus
- Species: P. leptodactylus

Binomial name
- Pontastacus leptodactylus (Eschscholtz, 1823)

Synonyms
- Astacus leptodactylus Eschscholtz, 1823; Astacus angulosus Rathke, 1837; Astacus leptodactylus boreoorientalis Birstein & Vinogradov, 1934; Astacus (Pontastacus) leptodactylus leptodactylus natio intermedius Karaman, 1963; Astacus (Pontastacus) leptodactylus leptodactylus natio caeareensis Pretzmann, 1973

= Pontastacus leptodactylus =

Species of crayfish

Pontastacus leptodactylus, the Danube crayfish, Galician crayfish, Turkish crayfish or narrow-clawed crayfish, is a relatively large and economically important species of crayfish. It is native to fresh and brackish waters in Eastern Europe and Western Asia, mainly in the Pontic–Caspian region. It can also be found in areas including the basins of the Black Sea, and the Danube, Dnieper, Don, and Volga rivers, as well as aquatic systems in Turkey. It has spread widely beyond its native range, beginning in the 1700s when it spread via canals constructed in western Russia and since the 1900s through introductions to many regions for human consumption. Today it is widespread throughout much of Europe.

== Description ==
Pontastacus leptodactylus can grow up to 30 centimetres (12 in) in length from the tip of the rostrum to the end of the telson (tail), but is more commonly found at around 15 cm (6 in) in length.

The sides of the thorax are very rough, usually pale yellow to pale green in colour. P. leptodactylus has two pairs of post-orbital ridges, the second of which may have spines. It also has a prominent tubercle (small nodule) on the shoulder of the carapace. The claws of P. leptodactylus are long and narrow (hence the common name "narrow-clawed crayfish"). Their upper surface is rough, and the underside is the same colour as the body. A tubercle can be found on the fixed side of the claw. P. leptodactylus can be distinguished most easily from the European or broad-fingered crayfish, Astacus astacus, by the relatively thinner "fingers" of the claws.

Further studies done on P. leptodactylus found that they can be coinfected by two or more different pathogens. A study done by R. Salighehzadeh saw that after collecting 10 narrow-clawed crayfish found that they contained two pathogenic isolates simultaneously, Aeromonas hydrophilia and Fusarium solani.

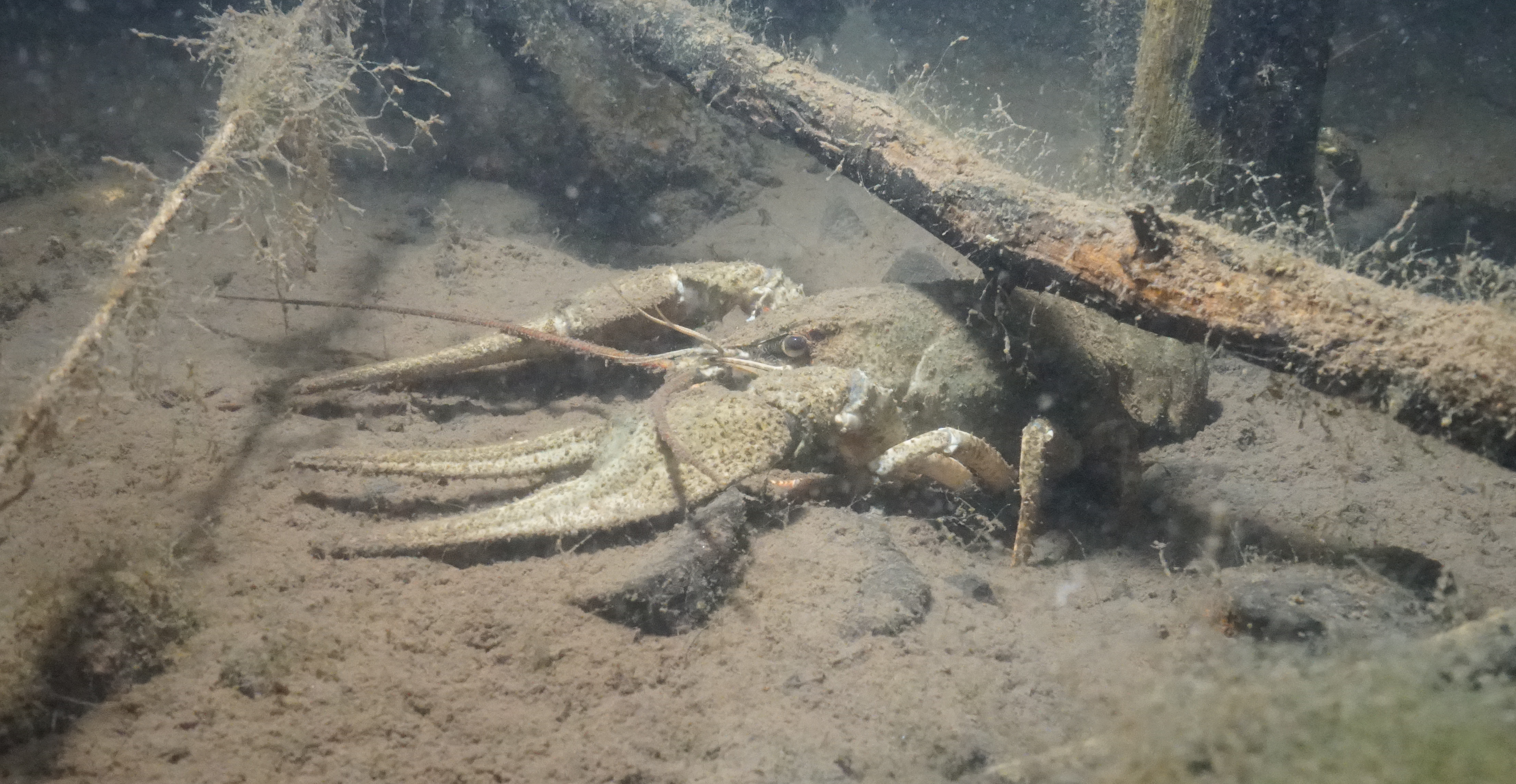
The Galician crayfish has long narrow claws.

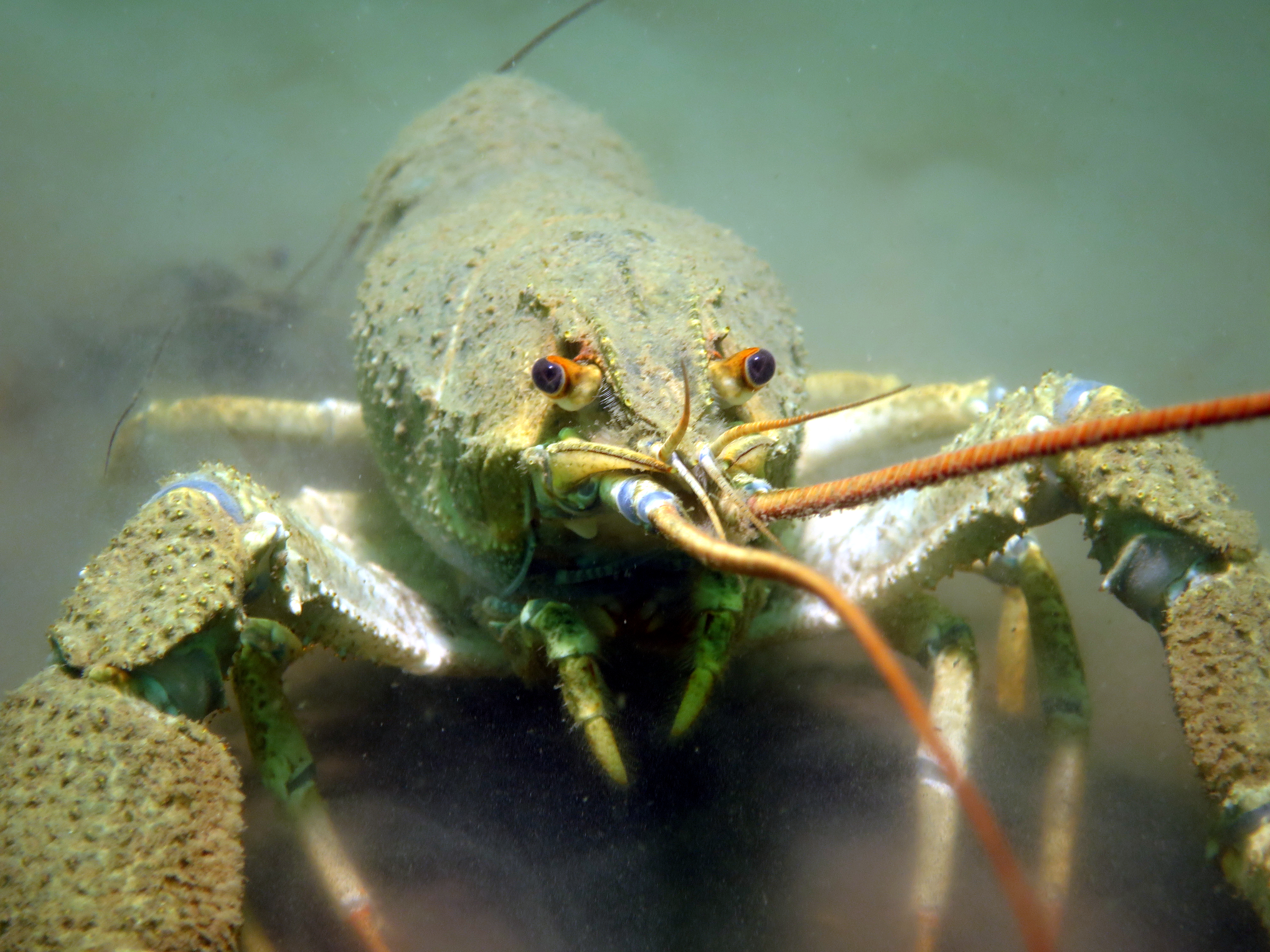
Closeup of the Galician crayfish

== Ecology ==
Pontastacus leptodactylus is fairly docile, especially the male with large claws.

It favours relatively still fresh and brackish waters such as lakes, lagoons, canals, and running waters in rivers.

It is listed as a species of least concern on the IUCN Red List.
