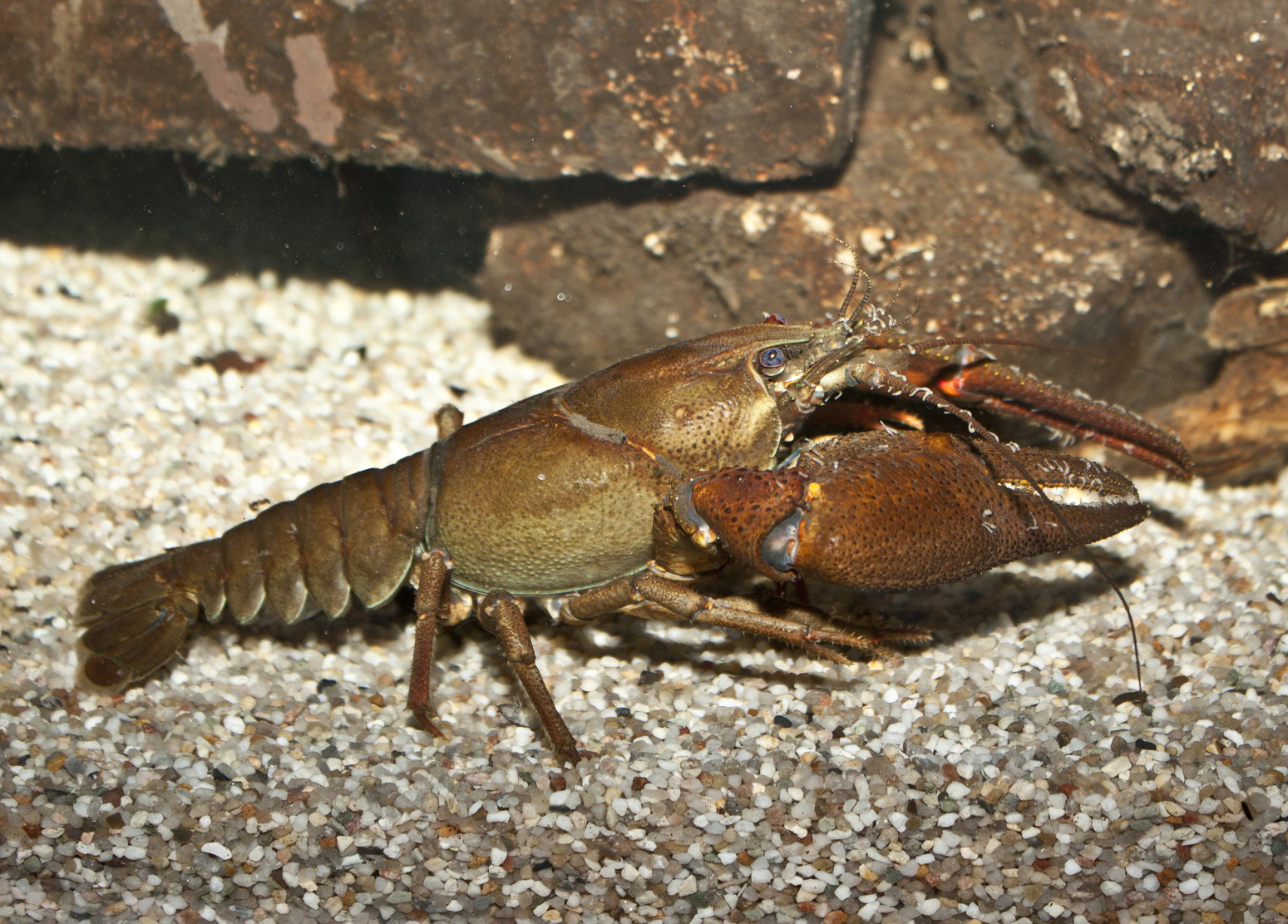
- Astacus astacus

Conservation status
- Vulnerable (IUCN 3.1)

Scientific classification
- Kingdom: Animalia
- Phylum: Arthropoda
- Clade: Pancrustacea
- Class: Malacostraca
- Order: Decapoda
- Suborder: Pleocyemata
- Family: Astacidae
- Genus: Astacus
- Species: A. astacus

Binomial name
- Astacus astacus (Linnaeus, 1758)

Subspecies
- A. a. astacus (Linnaeus, 1758); A. a. canadziae Starobogatov, 1996

Synonyms
- Astacus fluviatilis Fabricius, 1775; Cancer astacus Linnaeus, 1758; Cancer nobilis Schrank, 1803

= Astacus astacus =

Species of crayfish in Europe

Astacus astacus, the European crayfish, noble crayfish, or broad-fingered crayfish, is the most common species of crayfish in Europe, and a traditional food source. Like other true crayfish, A. astacus is restricted to fresh water, living only in unpolluted streams, rivers, and lakes. It is found from France throughout Central Europe, to the Balkan Peninsula, and north as far as Scandinavia and Finland, and Eastern Europe. Males may grow up to 16 cm (6 in) long, and females up to 12 centimetres (5 inches).

== Ecology ==
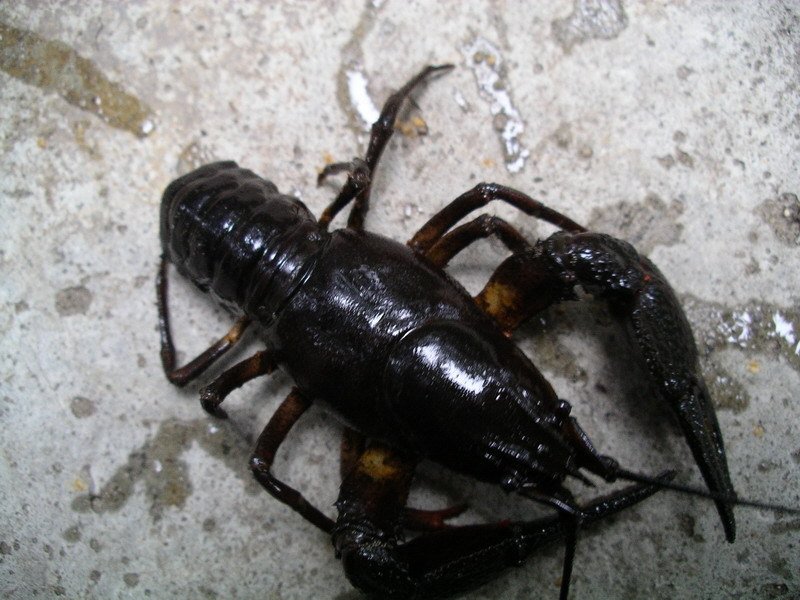
Noble crayfish can vary greatly in colour.

European crayfish feed on worms, aquatic insects, molluscs, and plants.

They are nocturnal, spending the day resting in a burrow. They prefer habitats with high levels of shelter availability. The waters they are found in tend to be soft-bottomed with some sand, and they do not tend to be found in muddy water.

A. astacus become sexually mature after three to four years and a series of moults, and breed in October and November. Fertilised eggs are carried by the female, attached to her pleopods, until the following May, when they hatch and disperse.

The main predators of A. astacus, both as juveniles and adults, are European mink, eels, perch, pike, Eurasian otters, and muskrats. There is also some risk of predation via cannibalism.

A. astacus is sensitive to dips in oxygen levels in the water it inhabits, which makes it particularly vulnerable to eutrophication. However, they are capable of tolerating lower calcium levels than most other species of crayfish.

A. astacus is regarded as a keystone species in the environments it inhabits. Crayfish are an important part of the freshwater food web as they provide a source of food to many aquatic species and boost primary productivity by foraging on freshwater plants. The loss of crayfish in a freshwater environment is known to cause macrophyte growth, which can be a cause for eutrophication and an overall degradation in water quality.

== Consumption ==
This species was once abundant in Europe, although it was expensive to buy, and is considered to be the finest edible crayfish. It is, however, susceptible to the crayfish plague carried by the invasive North American species signal crayfish (Pacifastacus leniusculus), so is listed as a vulnerable species on the IUCN Red List. Since the introduction of the plague, A. astacus has dropped to about 5% of its former population.

A golden crayfish pictured in the coat of arms of Oulainen

Documentation of the consumption of A. astacus dates back to the Middle Ages, when it was popular among the Swedish nobility, spreading to all social classes by the 17th and 18th centuries due to its ready availability. The crayfish are collected from the wild in traps, a practice which is being replaced by more intensive aquaculture of the signal crayfish in man-made ponds. The consumption of crayfish is an important part of traditional Nordic culture, including the crayfish party (Swedish: kräftskiva; Finnish: rapujuhlat), a feast to mark the end of summer.

Hundreds of smaller or larger lakes were once found in the northern Moldavia, used for growing A. astacus meant for consumption during the extended fasting periods of the Orthodox Christian calendar. The area of the former Dorohoi County was one such area, and this legacy was visible in the county's historical coat of arms, featuring an A. astacus (Romanian: rac).

== Astacin ==
Astacins are a family of digestive enzymes, discovered in the 1990s, which were first isolated from A. astacus. More than 20 enzymes of this group have since been discovered in animals from Hydra to humans.
