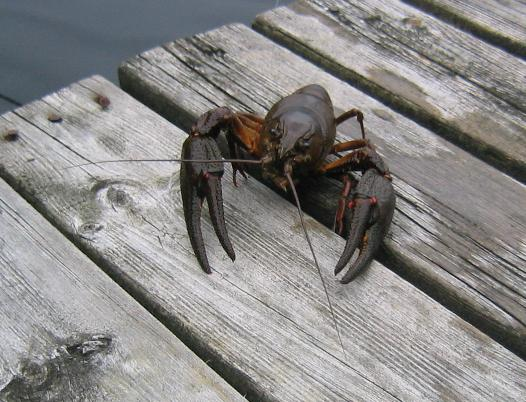
- Astacus astacus

Scientific classification
- Kingdom: Animalia
- Phylum: Arthropoda
- Clade: Pancrustacea
- Class: Malacostraca
- Order: Decapoda
- Suborder: Pleocyemata
- Infraorder: Astacidea
- Superfamily: Astacoidea
- Family: Astacidae; Latreille, 1802

Genera
- Astacus; Austropotamobius; †Emplastron; Pacifastacus; Pontastacus

= Astacidae =

Astacidae Temporal range: Barremian–Recent

Family of crayfishes

Astacidae is a family of freshwater crayfish native to Europe, western Asia and western North America. The family is made up of four extant (living) genera: The genera Astacus (which includes the European crayfish), Pontastacus (which includes the Turkish crayfish), and Austropotamobius are all found throughout Europe and parts of western Asia, while Pacifastacus (which includes the signal crayfish) is native to western United States and British Columbia, but has also been introduced elsewhere.

== Classification and phylogeny ==
Astacidae belongs to the superfamily Astacoidea, which contains all crayfish in the Northern Hemisphere. Astacoidea is the sister taxon to Parastacoidea, which contains all crayfish of the Southern Hemisphere. Crayfish and lobsters together comprise the infraorder Astacidea, as shown in the simplified cladogram below:

- Astacidea
  - clawed lobsters
    - Enoplometopoidea
      Enoplometopidae
    - Nephropoidea
      Nephropidae
  - crayfish
    - Parastacoidea
      Parastacidae
    - Astacoidea
      - Cambaroididae
      - - Astacidae
        - Cambaridae

The internal phylogeny of Astacidae can be further shown in the cladogram below:

- Astacidae
  - Pacifastacus
  - - - Astacus
      - Pontastacus
    - Austropotamobius

== Species ==
The family Astacidae contains the following genera and species:

- †"Austropotamobius" llopisi (Via, 1971) - Las Hoyas, Spain Early Cretaceous (Barremian)
- Astacus Fabricius, 1775
  - Astacus astacus (Linnaeus, 1775) - Europe - "European crayfish"
  - Astacus balcanicus (Karaman, 1929) - North Macedonia and Greece
  - Astacus colchicus Kessler, 1876 - Georgia (country)
  - ?†Astacus edwardsii Van Straelen, 1928 - France - proposed to new genus Emplastron in 2021 study
  - †Astacus laevissimus Fritsch & Kafka, 1887 - Czech Republic
  - †Astacus multicavatus Bell, 1863 - United Kingdom
- Austropotamobius Skorikov, 1907
  - Austropotamobius bihariensis (Pârvulescu, 2019) - Romania - "idle crayfish"
  - Austropotamobius fulcisianus (Ninni, 1886) - southern Europe (Italy, Croatia, Switzerland, Austria)
  - Austropotamobius pallipes (Lereboullet, 1858) - France - "white-clawed crayfish"
  - Austropotamobius torrentium (von Paula Schrank, 1803) - Germany, Croatia, North Macedonia - "stone crayfish"
- †Emplastron O'Flynn, Audo & Kawai, 2021
  - †Emplastron edwardsi (Van Straelen, 1928) - Sézanne, France - Paleocene (Thanetian)
- Pacifastacus Bott, 1950
  - †Pacifastacus chenoderma (Cope, 1871) - Idaho, USA
  - Pacifastacus connectens (Faxon, 1914) - Idaho, USA
  - Pacifastacus fortis (Faxon, 1914) - California, USA - "Shasta crayfish"
  - Pacifastacus gambelii (Girard, 1852) - California, USA
  - Pacifastacus leniusculus (Dana, 1852) - Columbia River, west coast of North America - "signal crayfish"
  - †Pacifastacus nigrescens (Stimpson, 1857) - around San Francisco, California, USA - "sooty crayfish" (recently extinct)
- Pontastacus Bott, 1950
  - Pontastacus cubanicus (Birstein & Vinogradov, 1934) - Black Sea, Russia
  - Pontastacus danubialis Brodsky, 1981 - Danube Delta lakes, Ukraine
  - Pontastacus daucinus Brodsky, 1981 - Danube Delta lakes, Ukraine and Moldova
  - Pontastacus eichwaldi (Bott, 1950) - Caspian Sea
  - Pontastacus kessleri (Schimkewitsch, 1886) - Turkestan
  - Pontastacus leptodactylus (Eschscholtz, 1823) - around the Black Sea, in Crimea, Russia, and Turkey - "Turkish crayfish"
  - Pontastacus pachypus (Rathke, 1837) - Caspian Sea, Black Sea, Sea of Azov - "Caspian crayfish"
  - Pontastacus pylzowi (Skorikov, 1907) - eastern part of Transcaucasia
  - Pontastacus salinus (von Nordmann, 1842) - Black Sea
