= Pontastacus pachypus =

Conservation status
- Data Deficient (IUCN 3.1)

Scientific classification
- Kingdom: Animalia
- Phylum: Arthropoda
- Class: Malacostraca
- Order: Decapoda
- Suborder: Pleocyemata
- Family: Astacidae
- Genus: Pontastacus
- Species: P. pachypus

Binomial name
- Pontastacus pachypus (Rathke, 1837)

Synonyms
- Astacus pachypus Rathke, 1837; Astacus caspius Eichwald, 1841; Astacus pachypus var. lacustris Czerniavsky, 1884; Caspiastacus pachypus (Rathke, 1837); Pontastacus pachypus notabilis Brodsky, 1981; Potamobius pachypus (Rathke, 1837)

Species of crayfish

Pontastacus pachypus, the Caspian crayfish is a species of crayfish found in the Caspian Sea, the Don river, and parts of the Black Sea and Sea of Azov, where it lives in salinities of up to 14‰. It is listed as data deficient in the IUCN Red List.
