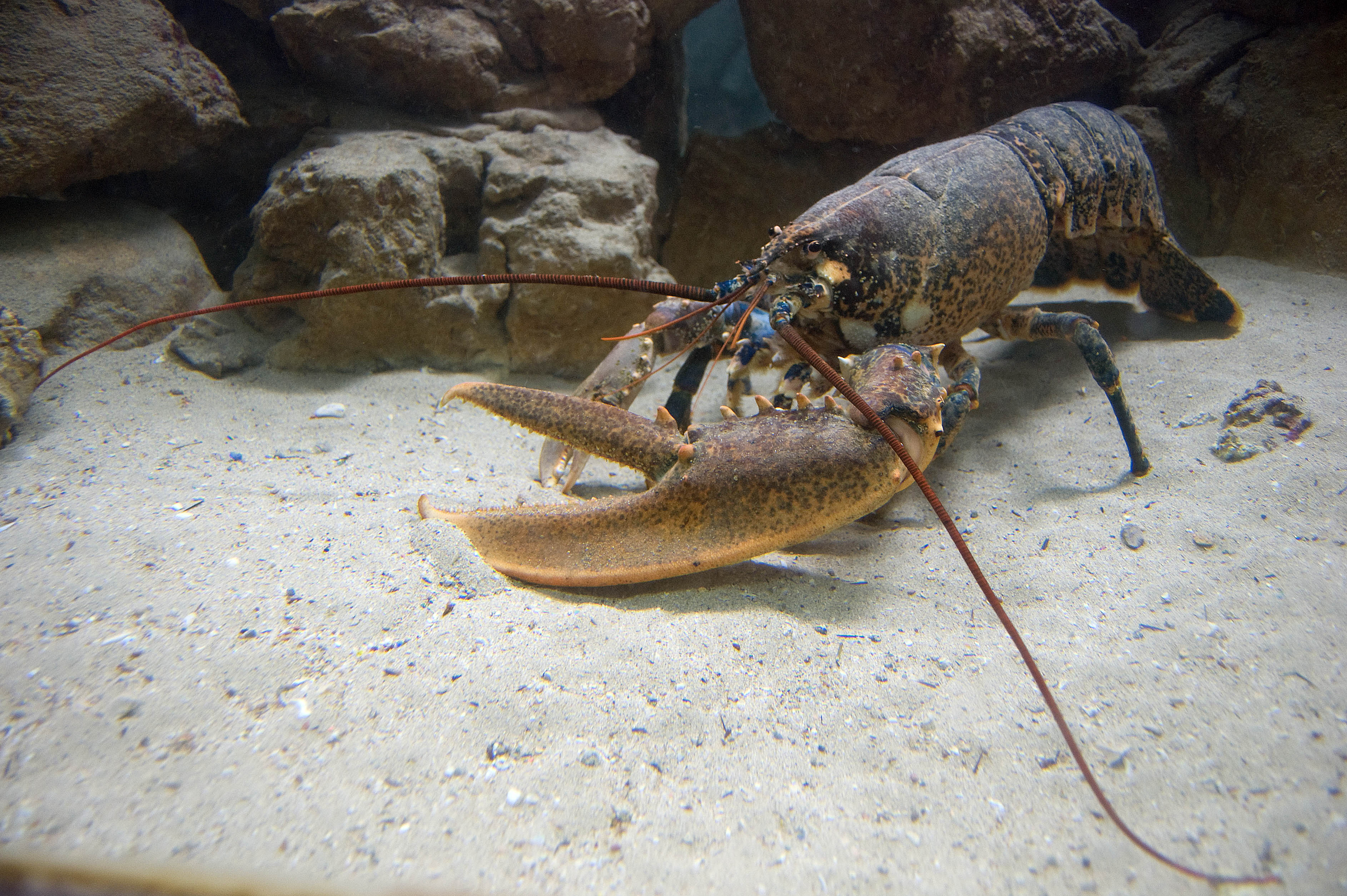
- Adriatic lobster
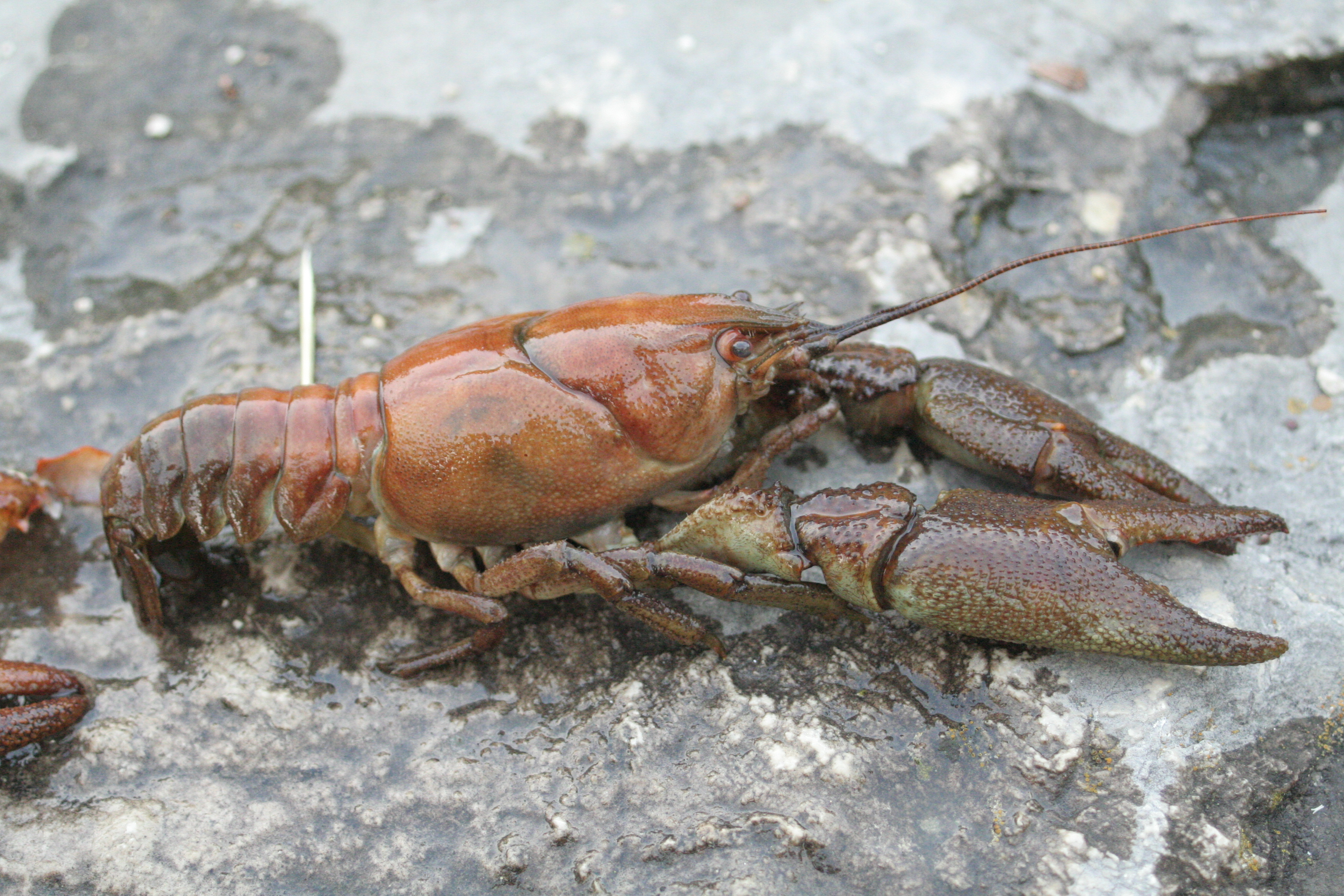
- Crayfish: Austropotamobius pallipes

Scientific classification
- Kingdom: Animalia
- Phylum: Arthropoda
- Clade: Pancrustacea
- Class: Malacostraca
- Order: Decapoda
- Suborder: Pleocyemata
- Clade: Reptantia
- Infraorder: Astacidea; Latreille, 1802

Superfamilies
- Astacoidea; Enoplometopoidea; Nephropoidea; † Palaeopalaemonoidea; Parastacoidea

= Astacidea =

Astacidea Temporal range: 279–0 Ma Middle Permian - present

Infraorder of crustaceans

Astacidea is an infraorder of decapod crustaceans including lobsters (but not spiny lobsters), crayfish, and their close relatives.

== Description ==
The Astacidea are distinguished from most other decapods by the presence of chelae (claws) on each of the first three pairs of pereiopods (walking legs), the first of which is much larger than the remaining two pairs. The last two pairs of pereiopods are simple (without claws), except in Thaumastocheles, where the fifth pereiopod may have "a minute pincer".

== Distribution ==
Members of the infraorder Astacidea are found throughout the world – both in the oceans and in fresh water – except for mainland Africa and parts of Asia.

== Classification ==
Astacidea belongs to the group Reptantia, which consists of the walking/crawling decapods (lobsters and crabs). Astacidea is the sister clade to the infraorder Polychelida, a small group of crustaceans restricted to deep waters. The cladogram below shows Astacidea's placement within the larger order Decapoda, from analysis by Wolfe et al., 2019.

- Decapoda
  - - Dendrobranchiata (prawns)
  - Pleocyemata
    - - Stenopodidea (boxer shrimp)
      - - Procarididea
        - Caridea ("true" shrimp)
    - Reptantia (crawling / walking decapods)
      - - Achelata (spiny lobsters and slipper lobsters)
        - - Polychelida (benthic crustaceans)
          - Glypheidea (glypheoid lobsters)
          - Astacidea (lobsters and crayfish)
      - - Axiidea (mud shrimp, ghost shrimp, and burrowing shrimp)
        - - Gebiidea (mud lobsters and mud shrimp)
          - - Anomura (hermit crabs and allies)
            - Brachyura ("true" crabs)

The infraorder Astacidea comprises four extant superfamilies, two of crayfish (Astacoidea and Parastacoidea), one of true lobsters (Nephropoidea), one of reef lobsters (the genus Enoplometopus), and a number of fossil taxa. As of 2009, the group contains 782 recognised species, over 400 of which are in the crayfish family Cambaridae. The members of the infraorder Glypheidea (containing numerous fossils and the two extant species Neoglyphea inopinata and Laurentaeglyphea neocaledonica) were formerly included here.

The cladogram below shows Astacidea's internal relationships and the early split between lobsters and crayfish:

- Astacidea
  - clawed lobsters
    - Enoplometopoidea
      Enoplometopidae
    - Nephropoidea
      Nephropidae
  - crayfish
    - Parastacoidea
      Parastacidae
    - Astacoidea
      - Cambaroididae
      - - Astacidae
        - Cambaridae

== Taxonomy ==
- Palaeopalaemonoidea †
  1. Palaeopalaemonidae †
- Enoplometopoidea
  1. Enoplometopidae
  2. Uncinidae †
- Nephropoidea
  1. Chilenophoberidae †
  2. Nephropidae
  3. Protastacidae †
  4. Stenochiridae †
- Astacoidea
  1. Astacidae
  2. Cambaridae
  3. Cambaroididae
  4. Cricoidoscelosidae †
- Parastacoidea
  1. Parastacidae
