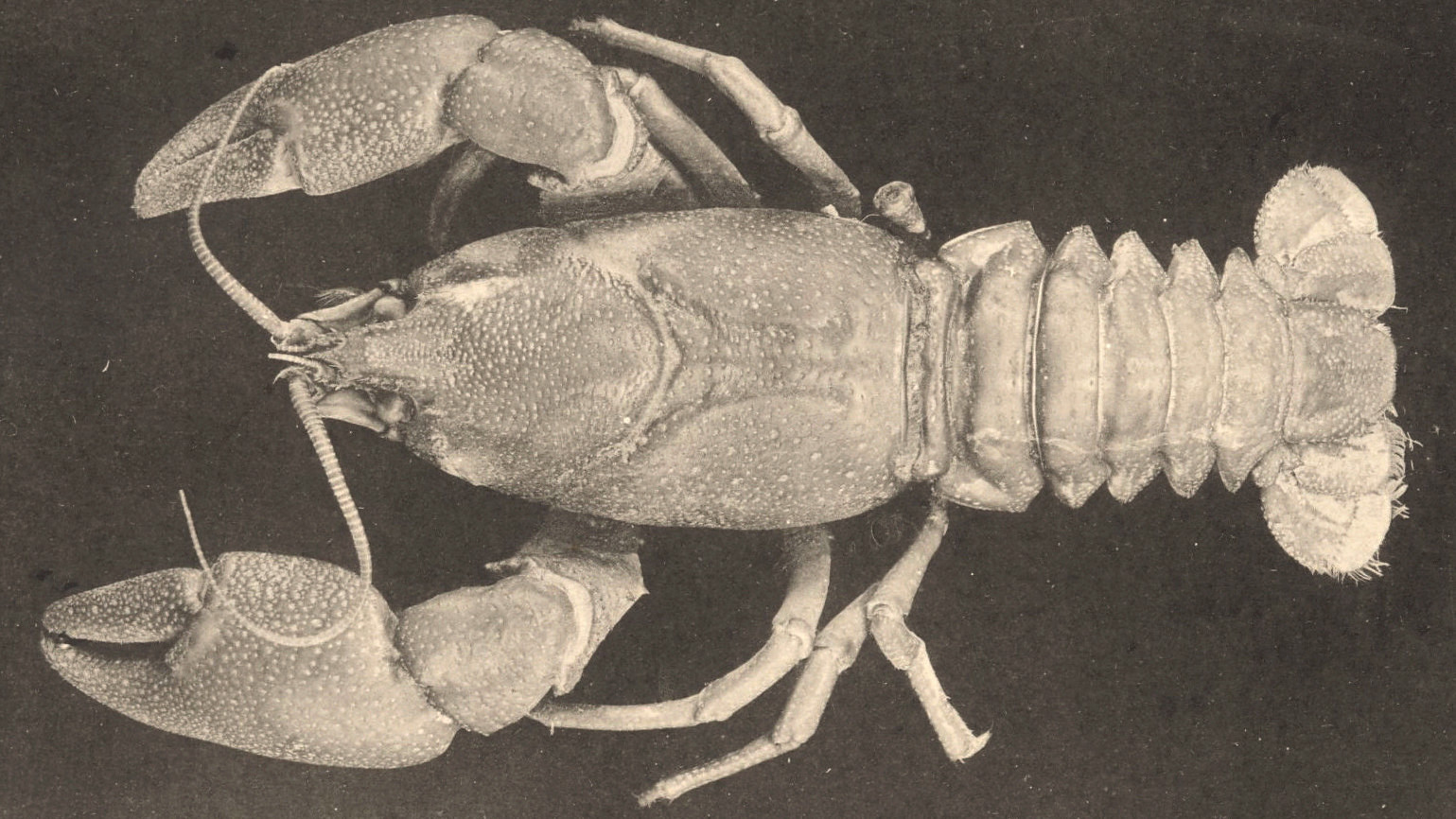

Conservation status
- Extinct (IUCN 3.1)

Scientific classification
- Kingdom: Animalia
- Phylum: Arthropoda
- Class: Malacostraca
- Order: Decapoda
- Suborder: Pleocyemata
- Family: Astacidae
- Genus: Pacifastacus
- Species: †P. nigrescens

Binomial name
- †Pacifastacus nigrescens (Stimpson, 1857)

= Pacifastacus nigrescens =

Extinct species of crayfish

Pacifastacus nigrescens, the sooty crayfish, is an extinct species of crayfish in the family Astacidae. It was originally described in 1857 by William Stimpson from the area around San Francisco, where it was once common in the creeks surrounding San Francisco Bay. The signal crayfish, Pacifastacus leniusculus was introduced to California, probably in the 19th century, and since then, no sightings of P. nigrescens have been made; it is now believed to be extinct. Intensive searches of its former habitat have found that every site where it once occurred is now occupied by either the signal crayfish or Procambarus clarkii.

The preserved specimen of male and female P. nigrescens, suggests that scale bars for males is 5 mm (0.20 in), while for females its 2 mm (0.079 in). The size of the specimen was 46.3 to 52.2 mm (1.82 to 2.06 in) for males, while females were 35 mm (1.4 in).
