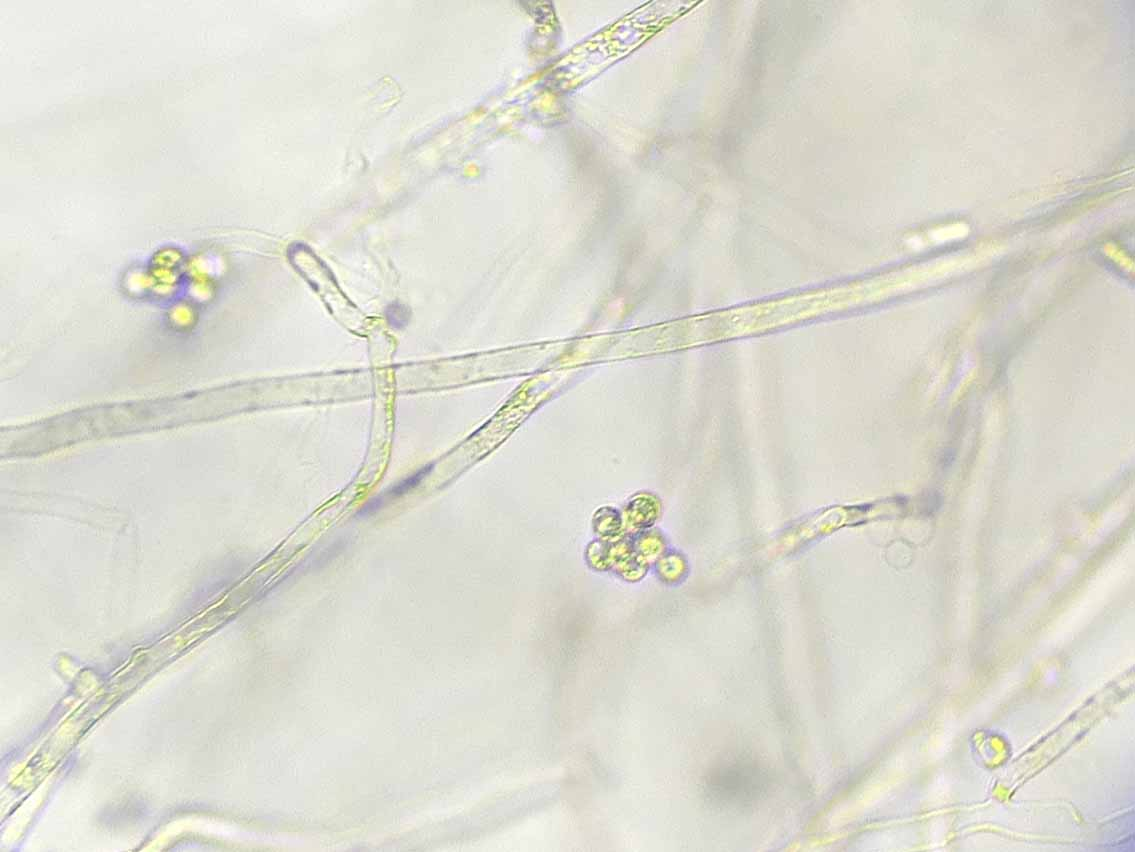
- Sporangia and hyphae

Scientific classification
- Domain: Eukaryota
- Supergroup: Stramenopiles
- Division: Oomycota
- Class: Saprolegniomycetes
- Order: Saprolegniales
- Family: Leptolegniaceae
- Genus: Aphanomyces
- Species: A. astaci

Binomial name
- Aphanomyces astaci Schikora, 1906

= Crayfish plague =

Water mold disease

Crayfish plague (Aphanomyces astaci) is an oomycete that infects crayfish, most notably the European Astacus which dies within a few weeks of being infected. When experimentally tested, species from Australia, New Guinea and Japan were also found to be susceptible to the infection.

== Morphology ==
Crayfish plague invades tissue with hyphae. The hyphae develop sporangia that release amoeboid primary spores, which develop into flagellated secondary zoospores after encystment. The secondary zoospores have two flagella each and can repeatedly encyst before finally reaching a host, attaching and germinating.

== History ==
Crayfish plague first arrived in Europe in Italy in 1859, either with imported crayfish from North America, or in ballast water discharge. After its original introduction in Italy in 1860, it spread quickly through Europe and was discovered in Sweden in 1907, in Spain in 1972, in Norway in 1971, in Great Britain in 1981, in Turkey in 1984 and in Ireland in 1987.

In 1959, to bolster dwindling stocks of native crayfish, the signal crayfish was introduced to Sweden. The signal crayfish was known to be resistant, and it was not recognised at that time that it was a carrier of the disease. In 2015, after 150 years of contact, no resistance had been discovered in native European crayfish. But during later years, some populations that apparently have achieved different levels of resistance have been discovered.

This species was studied and named by the German Mycologist Friedrich Schikora (1859–1932), from a type specimen in Germany in 1906.

== Transmission ==
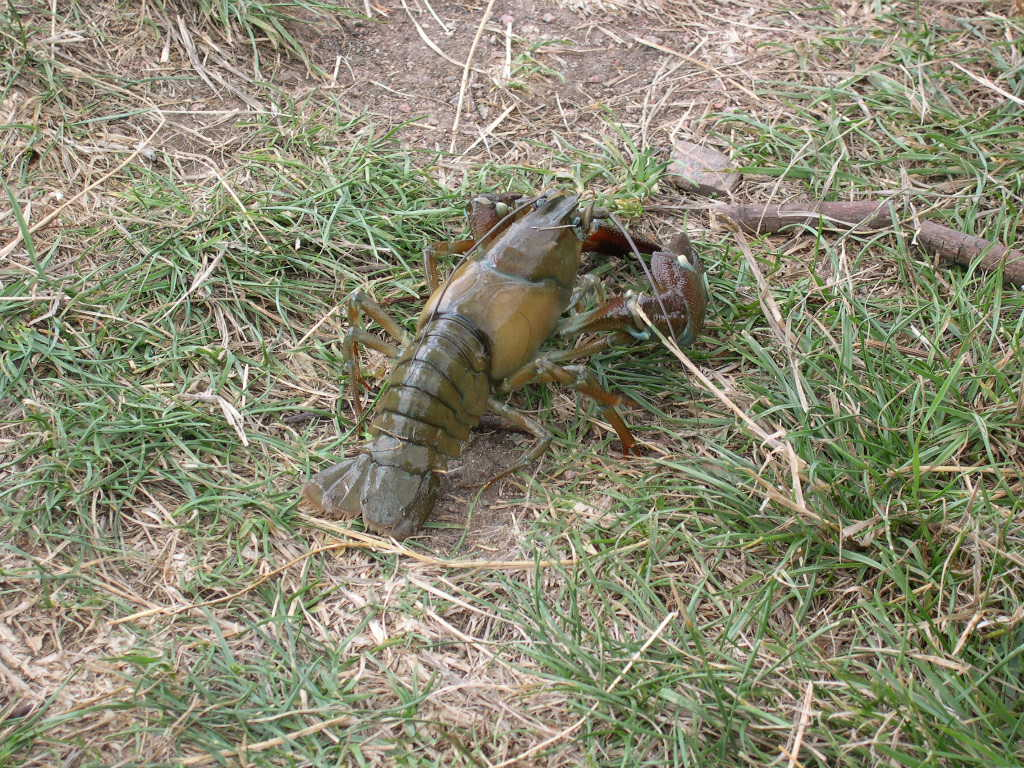
Signal crayfish, rear view, from Grand Union Canal near its inflow/overflow with the River Nene.

Transport of signal crayfish, red swamp crayfish and infected native European freshwater crayfish between waters is the main cause of contamination, though the disease can also be spread via items that have been in contact with contaminated water, such as a fishing tackle or footwear. The spores are sensitive to high or low temperatures. Most authorities have local rules and regulations to minimize the movement of water between different waterbodies (in for example a boat), and recommend that crayfish used as bait should come from the same water as that being fished, or should be frozen to at least −10 °C (14 °F) for one day before use, if there is a risk of contamination. The spores of crayfish plague disappear from an infected water system (connected lakes and rivers) within a few weeks once the last infected crayfish is removed. Reintroduction is then possible, as long as no infected waters are in contact with the lake.

== Signs ==
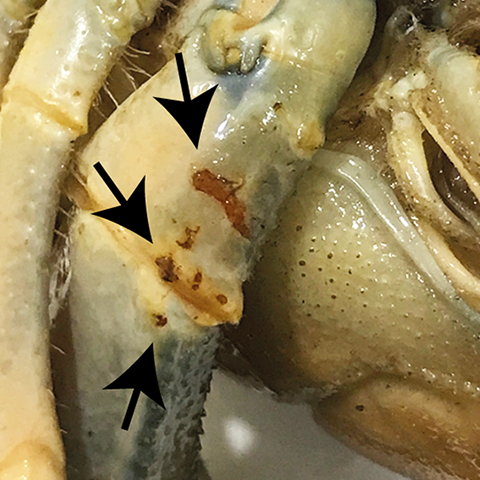
Melanization of ventral chela of colonized Pacifastacus leniusculus

Infection with Aphanomyces astaci is accompanied by few signs in its early stages, and the first indication of infection may be mortality. In the later stages, the muscles of the tail may appear whitened, or brownish-red where blood cells have encapsulated the hyphae. The effects of the neurotoxins in the oomycete can include appearing in daytime (crayfish are typically nocturnal) and a lack of coordination.
