= Palaeopalaemon =

Palaeopalaemon Temporal range: 376.1–360.7 Ma

Scientific classification
- Kingdom: Animalia
- Phylum: Arthropoda
- Clade: Pancrustacea
- Class: Malacostraca
- Order: Decapoda
- Suborder: Pleocyemata
- Family: †Palaeopalaemonidae; Brooks, 1962
- Genus: †Palaeopalaemon; Whitfield, 1880
- Species: †P. newberryi

Binomial name
- †Palaeopalaemon newberryi Whitfield, 1880

Genus of crustacean

Palaeopalaemon is an extinct genus of the oldest lobster-like aquatic decapod crustaceans, containing the species Palaeopalaemon newberryi.
