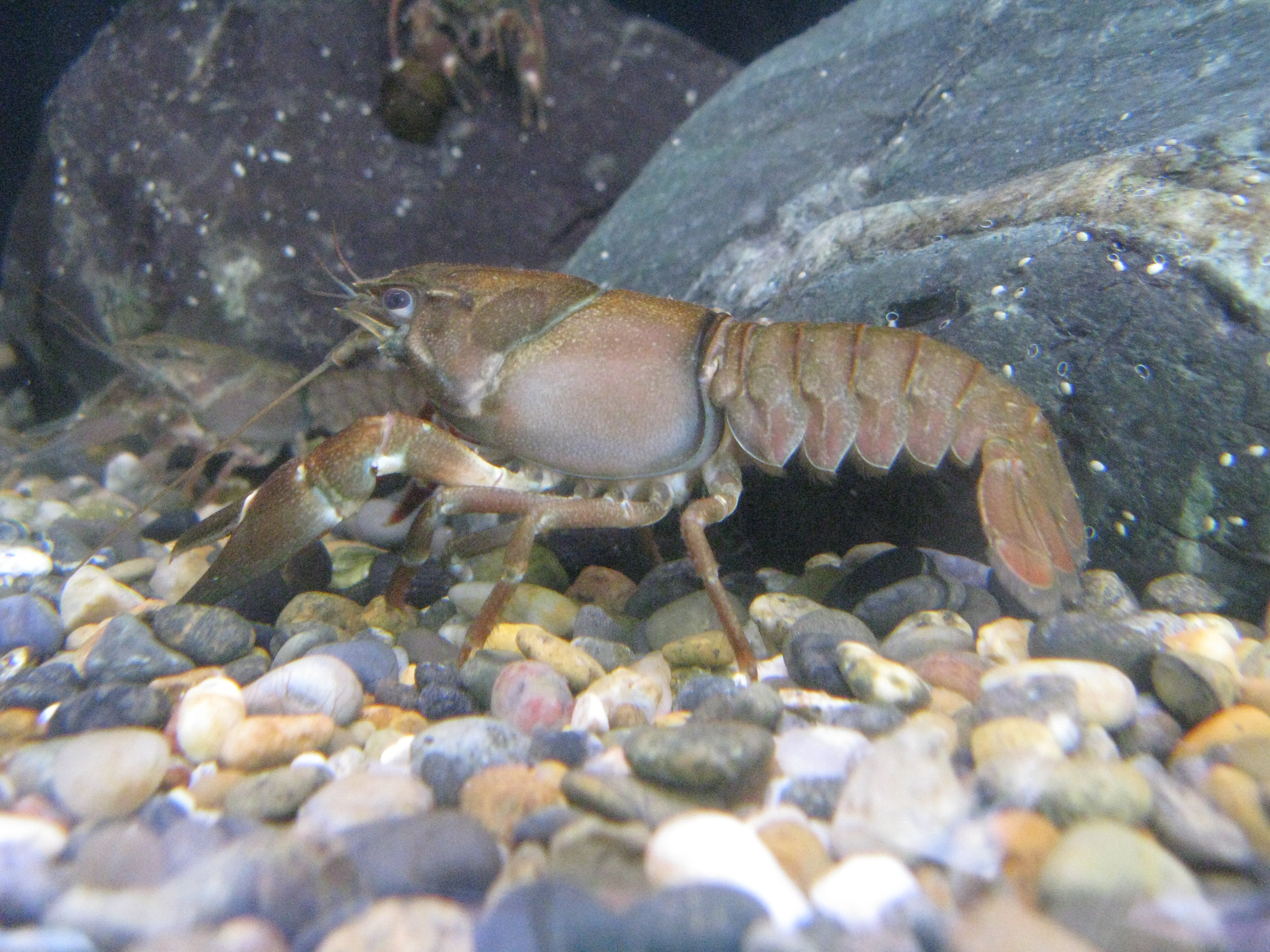
- Pacifastacus leniusculus

Scientific classification
- Kingdom: Animalia
- Phylum: Arthropoda
- Clade: Pancrustacea
- Class: Malacostraca
- Order: Decapoda
- Suborder: Pleocyemata
- Family: Astacidae
- Genus: Pacifastacus; Bott, 1950

Type species
- Astacus Klamathensis Stimpson, 1857

= Pacifastacus =

Genus of crayfishes

Pacifastacus is a genus of crayfish native to western North America (USA and Canada), containing 8 species, two of which are extinct:

- †Pacifastacus chenoderma (fossil: Miocene – Pliocene)
- Pacifastacus connectens
- Pacifastacus fortis – Shasta crayfish
- Pacifastacus gambelii
- Pacifastacus leniusculus – signal crayfish
- †Pacifastacus nigrescens – Sooty crayfish
- Pacifastacus okanaganensis – Okanogan crayfish
- Pacifastacus malheurensis – Misfortunate crayfish
