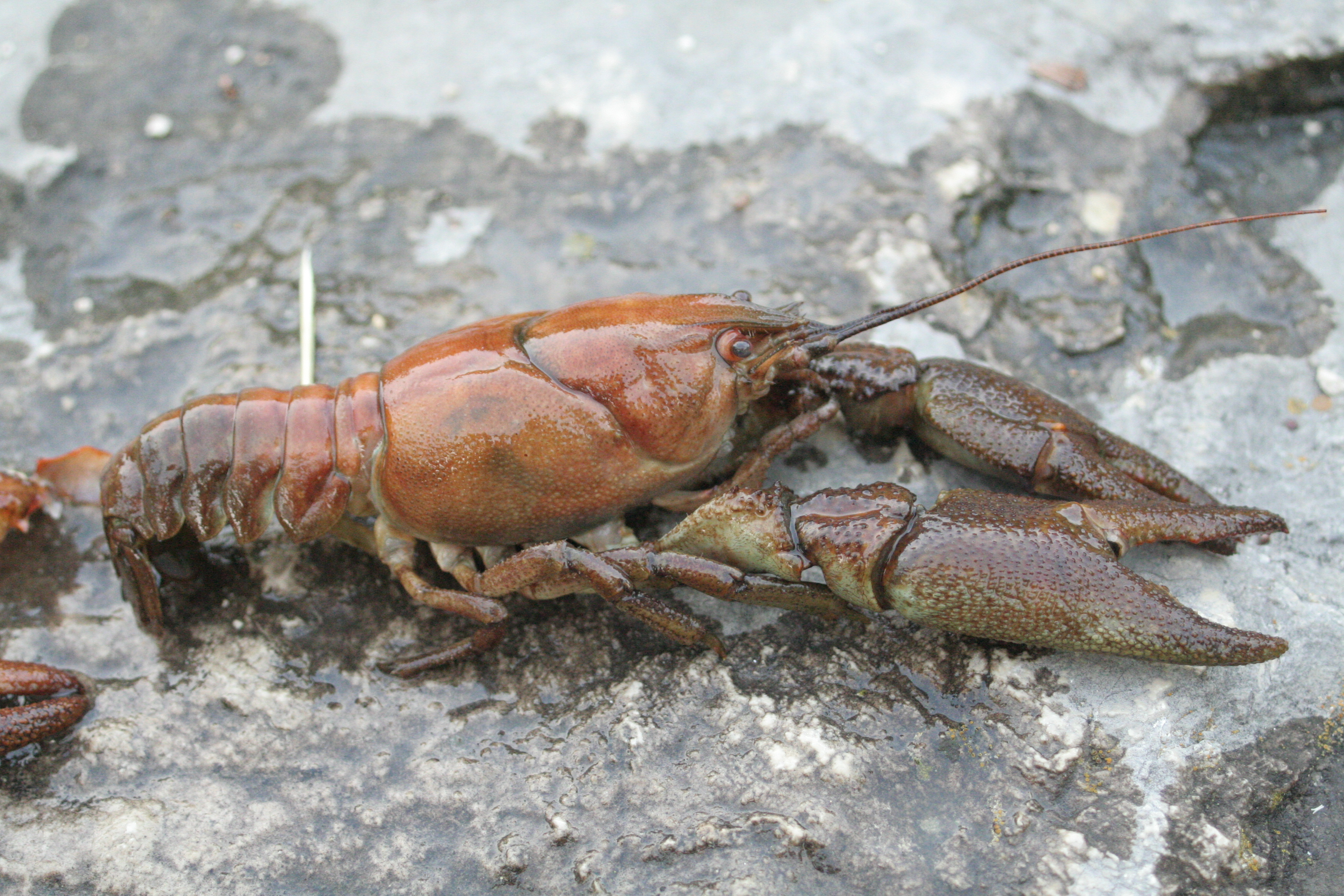
- Austropotamobius pallipes

Scientific classification
- Kingdom: Animalia
- Phylum: Arthropoda
- Clade: Pancrustacea
- Class: Malacostraca
- Order: Decapoda
- Suborder: Pleocyemata
- Infraorder: Astacidea
- Superfamily: Astacoidea; Latreille, 1802

Families
- Astacidae Latreille, 1802; Cambaridae Hobbs, 1942; Cambaroididae Villalobos, 1955

= Astacoidea =

Astacoidea Temporal range: 228–0 Ma Late Triassic - present

Superfamily of crustaceans

Astacoidea is superfamily of freshwater crayfish that live in the Northern Hemisphere. The other superfamily of crayfish, Parastacoidea, lives in the Southern Hemisphere. Astacoidea consists of three families: Astacidae (from Europe and western North America), Cambaridae (from eastern North America), and Cambaroididae (from eastern Asia). Crayfish are closely related to lobsters, as shown in the simplified cladogram below.

- Astacidea
  - clawed lobsters
    - Enoplometopoidea
      Enoplometopidae
    - Nephropoidea
      Nephropidae
  - crayfish
    - Parastacoidea
      Parastacidae
    - Astacoidea
      - Cambaroididae
      - - Astacidae
        - Cambaridae
