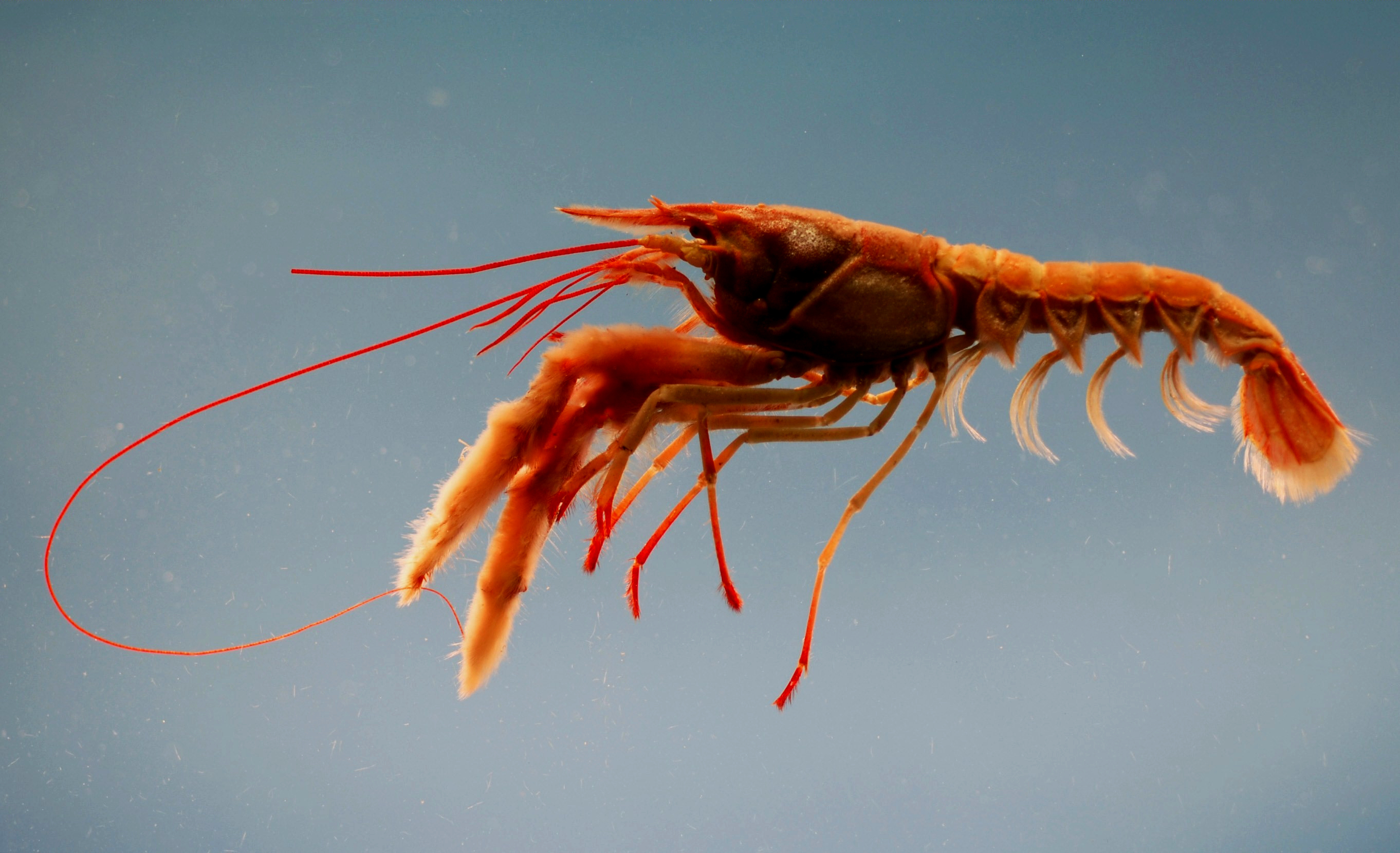
- Nephropsis rosea

Scientific classification
- Kingdom: Animalia
- Phylum: Arthropoda
- Clade: Pancrustacea
- Class: Malacostraca
- Order: Decapoda
- Suborder: Pleocyemata
- Infraorder: Astacidea
- Superfamily: Nephropoidea; Dana, 1852

Families
- Nephropidae Dana, 1852; †Chilenophoberidae Tshudy & Babcock, 1997; †Protastacidae Albrecht, 1983; †Stenochiridae Beurlen, 1928

= Nephropoidea =

Nephropoidea Temporal range: 279–0 Ma Middle Permian - present

Superfamily of lobsters

Nephropoidea is a superfamily of decapod crustaceans. It contains the true lobsters in the Nephropidae (including the rare thaumastochelid lobsters), and three fossil families: Chilenophoberidae, Protastacidae and Stenochiridae. Their closest relatives are the reef lobsters.
