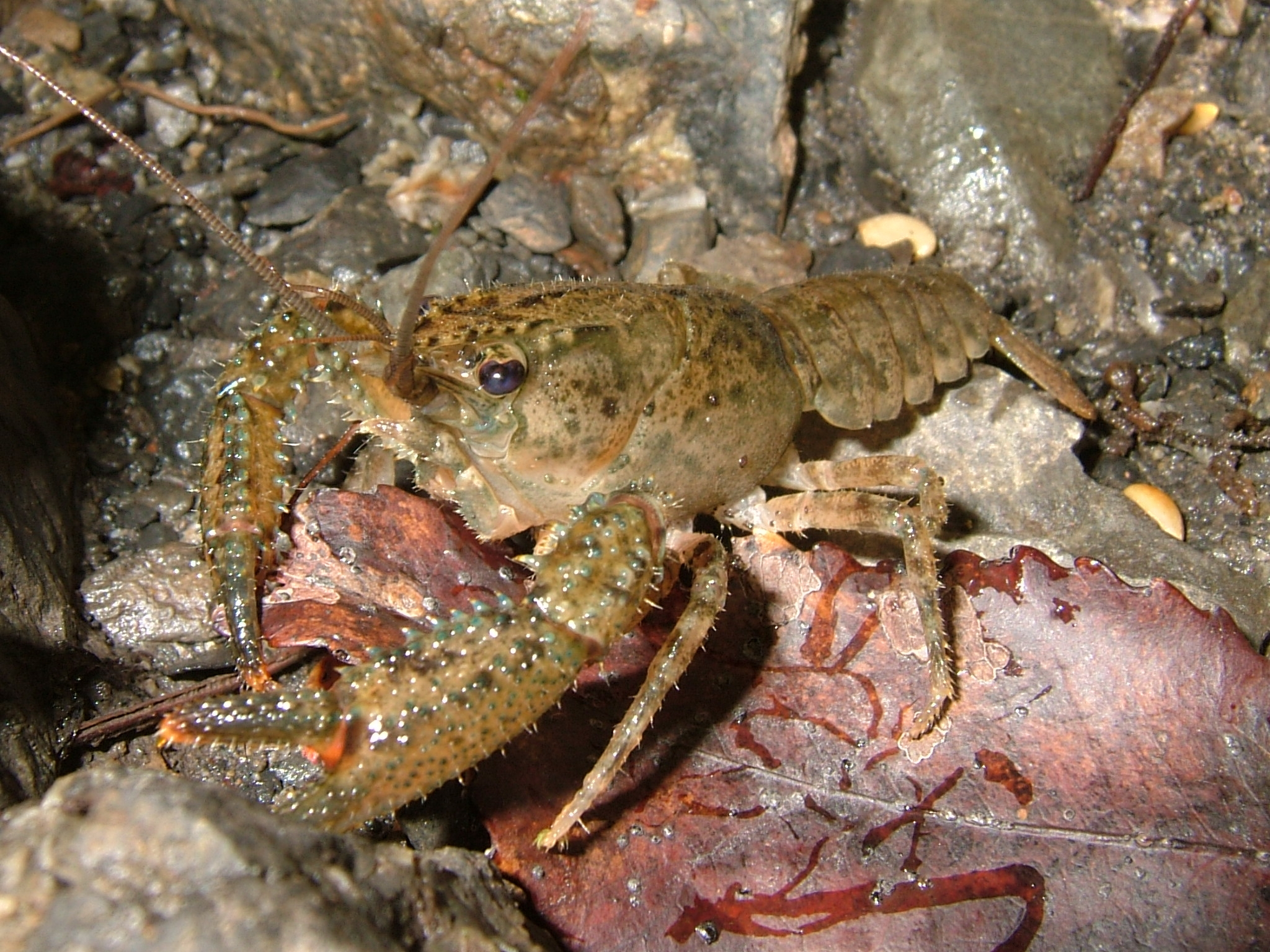
- Paranephrops species (Parastacidae)

Scientific classification
- Kingdom: Animalia
- Phylum: Arthropoda
- Clade: Pancrustacea
- Class: Malacostraca
- Order: Decapoda
- Suborder: Pleocyemata
- Clade: Reptantia
- Infraorder: Astacidea

Superfamilies and families
- Astacoidea: Astacidae; Cambaridae; Cambaroididae; Parastacoidea: Parastacidae

= Crayfish =

Crayfish Temporal range: Triassic–recent

Freshwater crustaceans

Rearing white-clawed crayfish at Cynrig hatchery, Wales. Establishing a breeding population from introduced captive-bred animals.

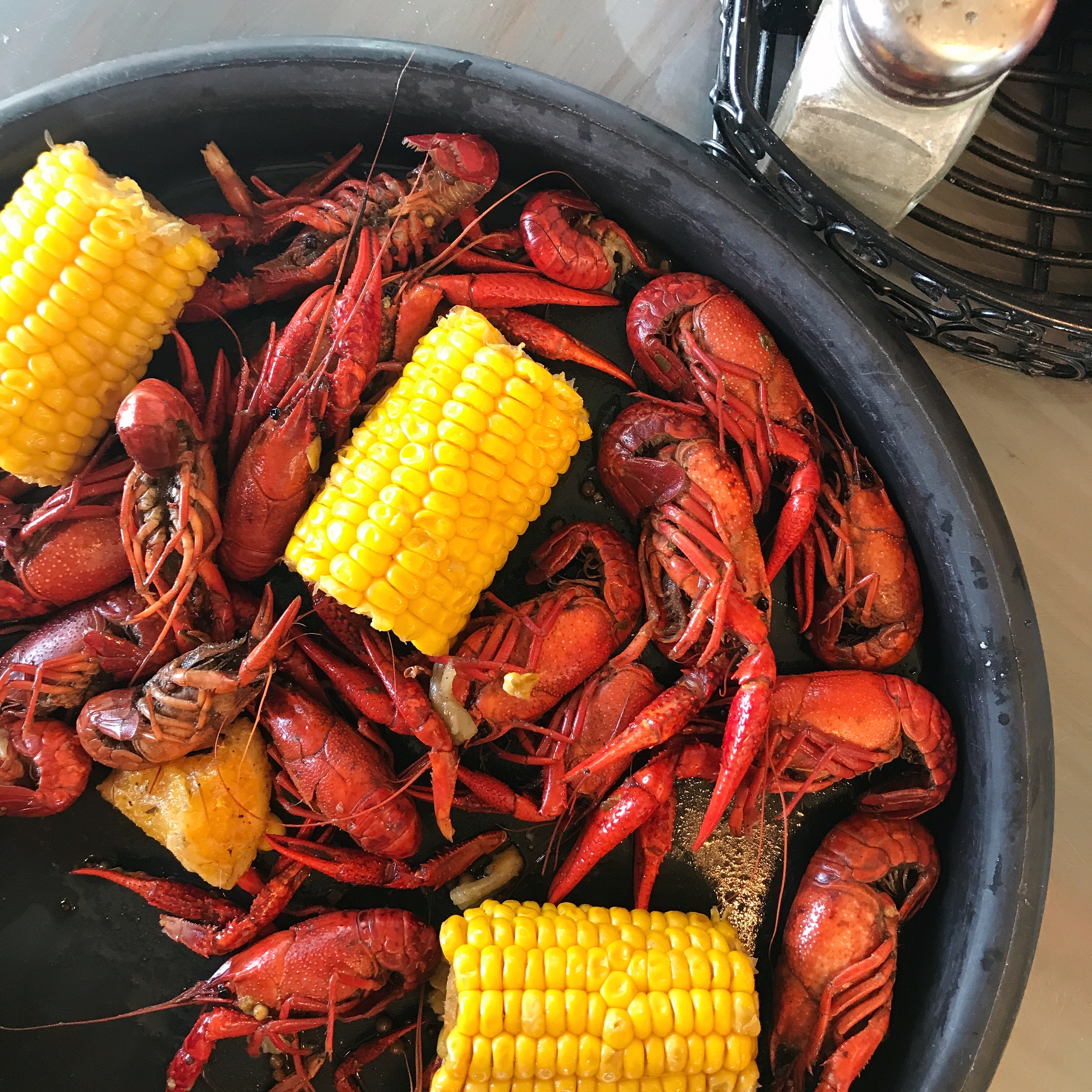
Cajun style crawfish

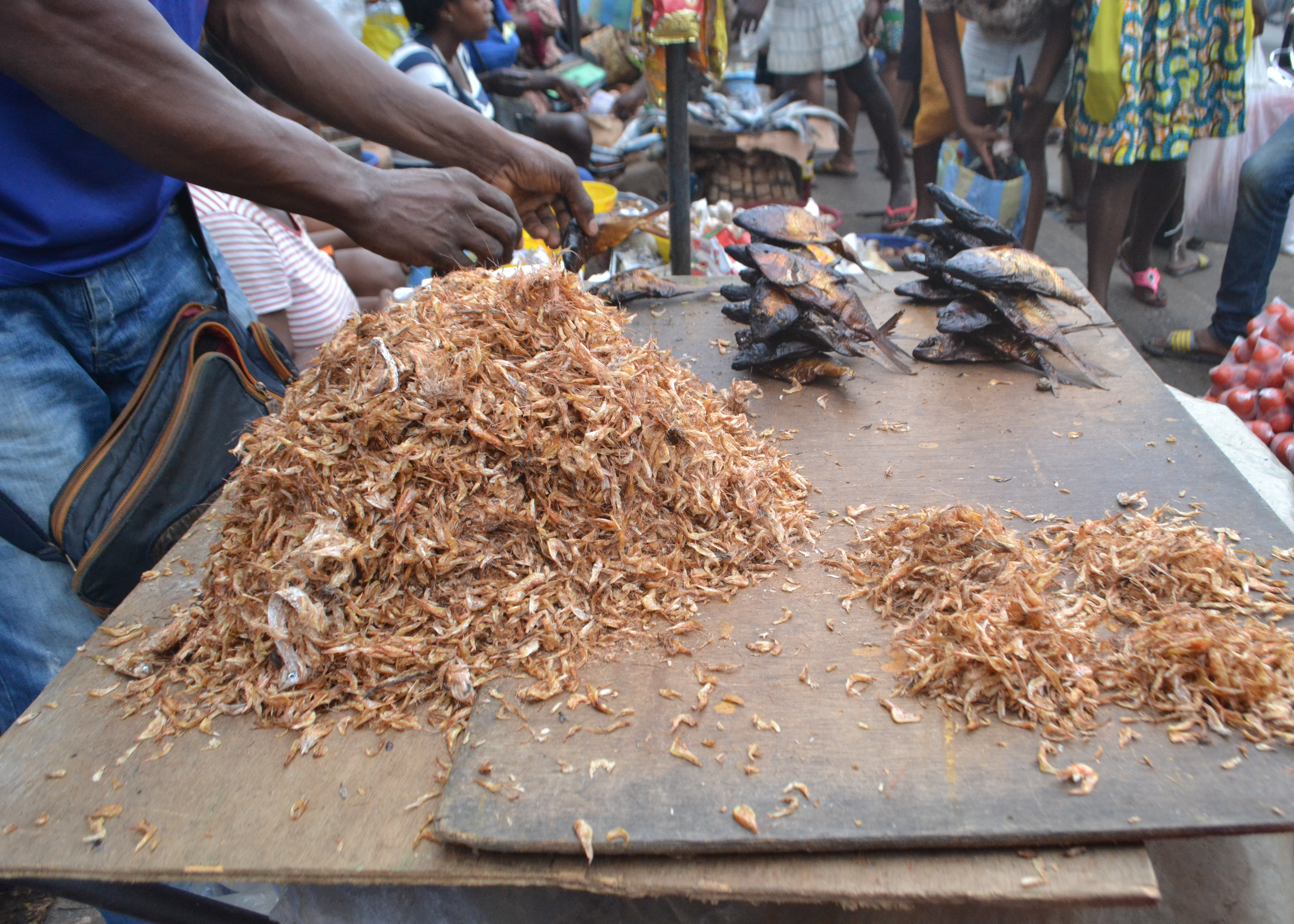
Dried crayfish at an African market

Crayfish, crawfish, or crawdads (Note: In some locations, they are also known as baybugs, crabfish, craws, crawbugs, crawdaddies, freshwater lobsters, mountain lobsters, mudbugs, rock lobsters, or yabbies.) are freshwater crustaceans belonging to the infraorder Astacidea, which also contains lobsters. Taxonomically, they are members of the superfamilies Astacoidea and Parastacoidea. They breathe through feather-like gills. Some species are found in brooks and streams, where fresh water is running, while others thrive in swamps, ditches, and paddy fields. Most crayfish cannot tolerate polluted water, although some species, such as Procambarus clarkii, are hardier. Crayfish feed on animals and plants, either living or decomposing, and detritus.

The term "crayfish" is applied to saltwater species in some countries.

== Terminology ==
The name "crayfish" comes from the Old French word escrevisse (Modern French écrevisse). The word has been modified to "crayfish" by association with "fish" (folk etymology). The largely American variant "crawfish" is similarly derived.

Some kinds of crayfish are known locally as lobsters, crawdads, mudbugs, and yabbies. In the Eastern United States, "crayfish" is more common in the north, while "crawdad" is heard more in central and southwestern regions, and "crawfish" farther south, although considerable overlaps exist.

Names used for crayfish in different locations include baybugs, crabfish, craws, crawfish, crawdaddies, crawdads, freshwater lobsters, mountain lobsters, mudbugs, rock lobsters, or yabbies.

The study of crayfish is astacology.

== Anatomy ==
The body of a decapod crustacean, such as a crab, lobster, or prawn (shrimp), is made up of twenty body segments grouped into two main body parts, the cephalothorax and the abdomen. Each segment may possess two pairs of appendages, although in various groups, these may be reduced or gone. On average, crayfish grow to 17.5 cm (6.9 in) in length. Walking legs have a small claw at the end.

== Diet ==
Crayfish are opportunistic omnivorous scavengers, with the ability to filter and process mud. In aquaculture ponds using isotope analysis they were shown to build body tissue selectively from the animal protein portion of pelleted food and not the other components of the pellet.

They have the potential to eat most foods, even nutrient poor material such as grass, leaves, and paper, but can be highly selective and need variety to balance their diet. The personalities of the individual crayfish can be a key determinant in the food preference behaviour in aquaria.

Crayfish all over the world can be seen in an ecological role of benthic dwellers, so this is where most of their food is obtained – at the sediment/water interface in ponds, lakes, swamps, or burrows. When the gut contents are analysed, most of the contents is mud: fine particulate organic matter (FPOM) and mixed particles of lignin and cellulose (roots, leaves, bark, wood). Some animal material can also be identified, but this only contributes a small portion of the diet by volume.

They feed on submerged vegetable material at times, but their ability to catch large living animal material is restricted. They can feed on interstitial organisms if they can be grasped in the small feeding claws. They can be lured into traps with an array of baits from dog biscuits, fish heads, meat, etc., all of which reinforces the fact that they are generalist feeders.

On a day-to-day basis, they consume what they can acquire in their immediate environment in limited space and time available – detritus. At a microbial level, the FPOM has a high surface area of organic particles and consists of a plethora of substrate and bacteria, fungi, micro-algae, meiofauna, partially decomposed organic material and mucus. This mucus or "slime" is a biofilm and can be felt on the surface of leaves and sticks. Also crayfish have been shown to be coprophagic – eating their own faeces, they also eat their own exuviae (moulted carapace) and each other. They have even been observed leaving the water to graze.

Detritus or mud is a mixture of dead plankton (plant and animal), organic wastes from the water column, and debris derived from the aquatic and terrestrial environments. Mostly detritus is in the end phase of decomposition and is recognised as black organic mud. The crayfish usually ingest the material in only a few minutes, as distinct from grazing for many hours. The material is mixed with digestive fluids and sorted by size. The finer particles follow a slower and more exacting route through to the hindgut, compared to the coarser material. The coarser material is eliminated first and often reappears in approximately 10 to 12 hours, whereas the finer material is usually eliminated from 16 to 26 hours after ingestion.

All waste products coming out through the hindgut are wrapped in a peritrophic membrane, so they look like a tube. Such an investment in the wrapping of the microbial free faeces in a protein rich membrane is most likely the reason they are coprophagic. Such feeding behaviour based on selection, ingestion, and extreme processing ensures periodic feeding, as distinct from continuous grazing. They tend to eat to satiation and then take many hours to process the material, leaving minimal chance of having more room to ingest other items. Crayfish usually have limited home range and so they rest, digest, and eliminate their waste, most commonly in the same location each day.

Feeding exposes the crayfish to risk of predation, and so feeding behaviour is often rapid and synchronised with feeding processes that reduce such risks – eat, hide, process and eliminate.

Knowledge of the diet of these creatures was considered too complex since the first book ever written in the field of zoology, The Crayfish by T.H. Huxley (1879), where they were described as "detritivores". This is why most researchers have not attempted to understand the diet of freshwater crayfish. The most complex study which matched the structure and function of the whole digestive tract with ingested material was performed in the 1990s by Brett O'Brien on marron, the least aggressive of the larger freshwater crayfish with aquaculture potential, similar to redclaw and yabbies.

== Classification and geographical distribution ==
Three families of crayfish

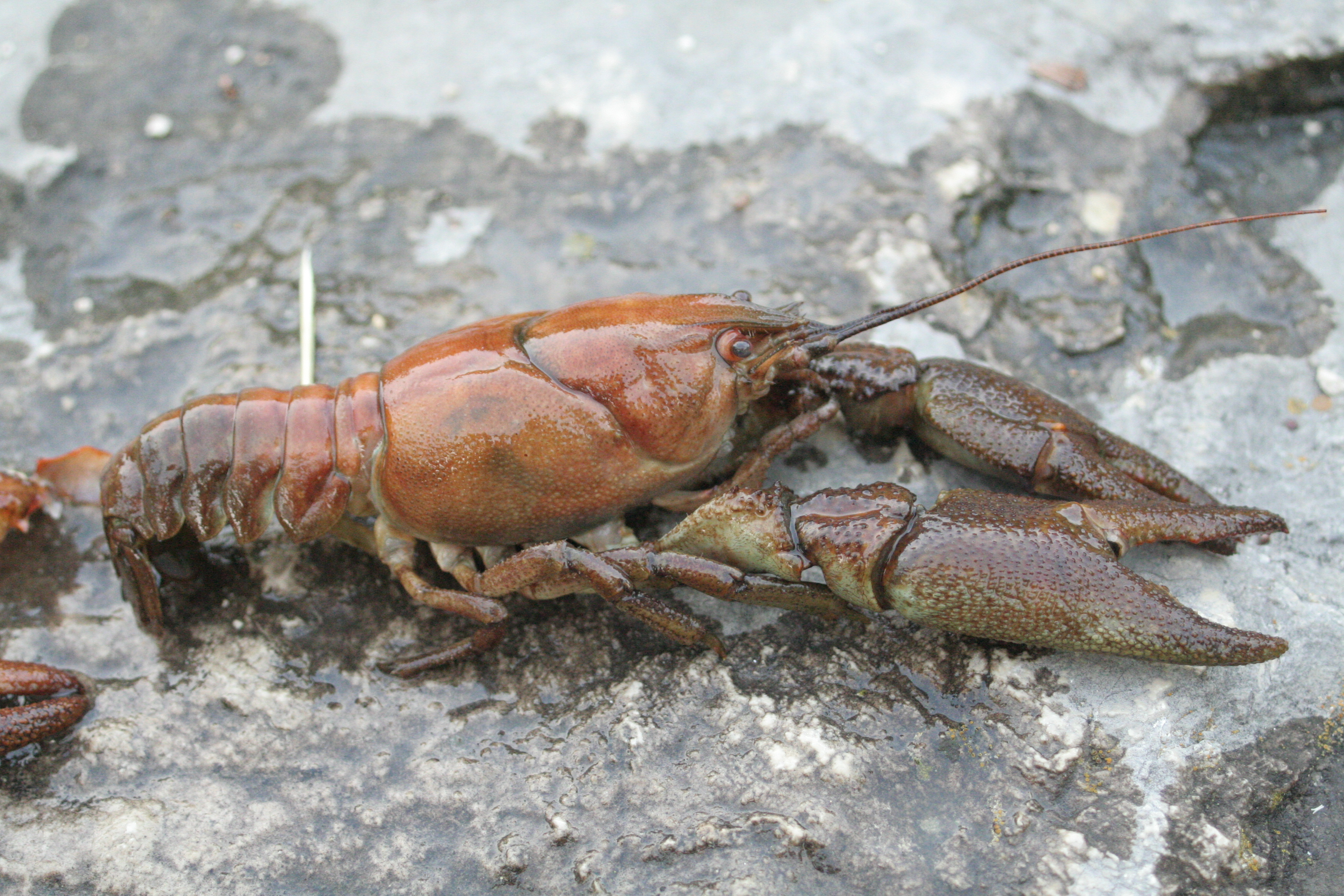
Astacidae: Austropotamobius pallipes

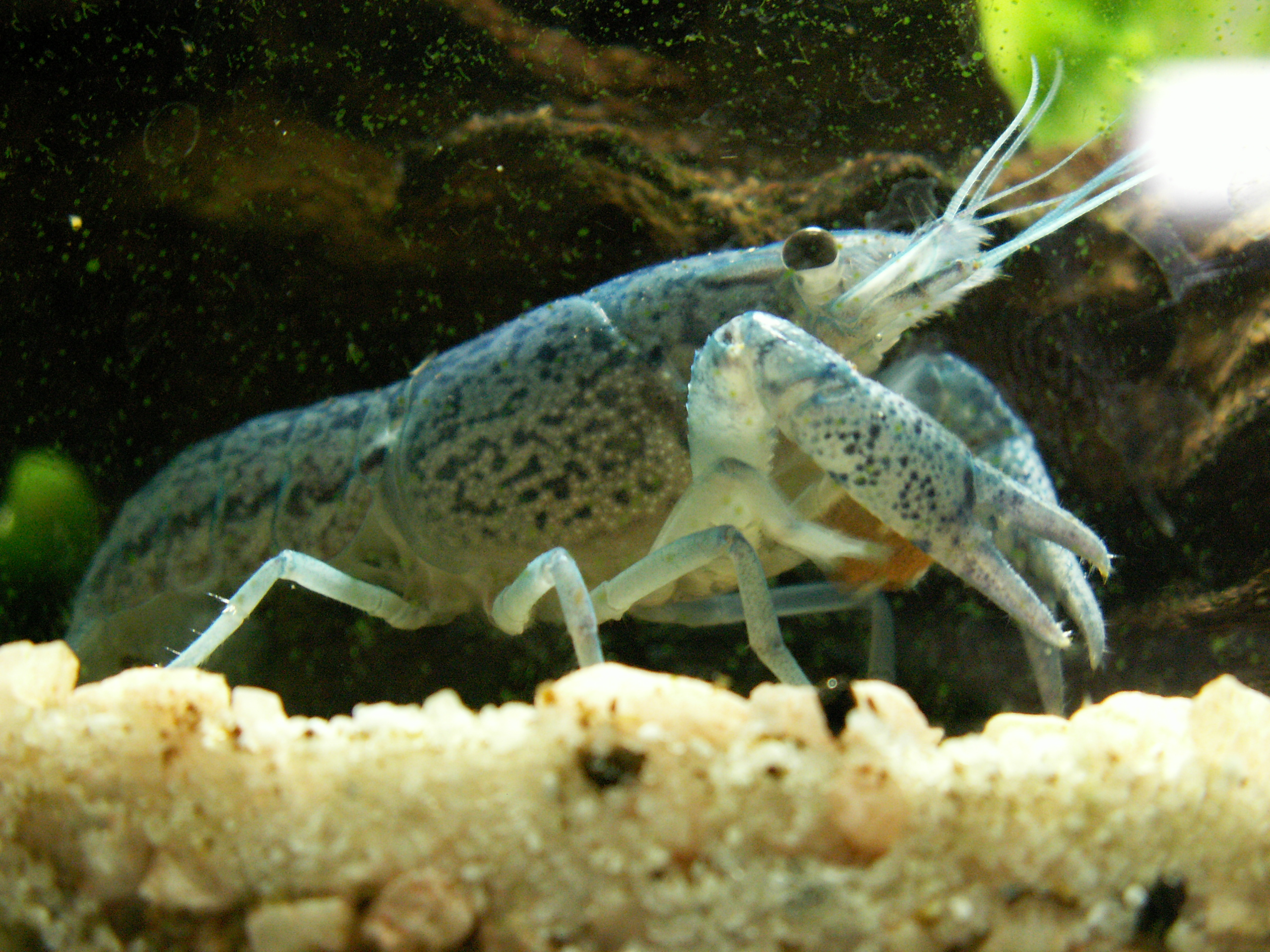
Cambaridae: Procambarus alleni

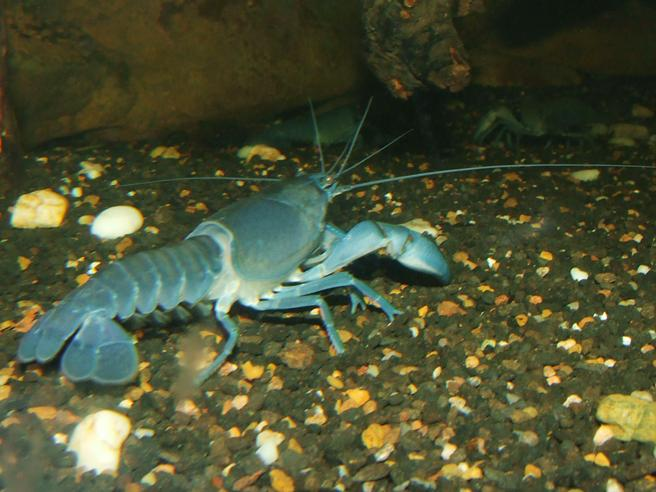
Parastacidae: Cherax destructor

Various crayfish (Procambarus clarkii) in the wild in Kanagawa, Japan

Crayfish are closely related to lobsters, and together they belong to the infraorder Astacidea. Their phylogeny can be shown in the simplified cladogram below:

- Astacidea
  - clawed lobsters
    - Enoplometopoidea
      Enoplometopidae
    - Nephropoidea
      Nephropidae
  - crayfish
    - Parastacoidea
      Parastacidae
    - Astacoidea
      - Cambaroididae
      - - Astacidae
        - Cambaridae

Four extant (living) families of crayfish are described, three in the Northern Hemisphere and one in the Southern Hemisphere. The Southern Hemisphere (Gondwana-distributed) family Parastacidae, with 14 extant genera and two extinct genera, live(d) in South America, Madagascar, and Australasia. They are distinguished by the absence of the first pair of pleopods. Of the other three Northern Hemisphere families (grouped in the superfamily Astacoidea), the four genera of the family Astacidae live in western Eurasia and western North America, the 15 genera of the family Cambaridae live in eastern North America, and the single genus of Cambaroididae live in eastern Asia.

=== North America ===
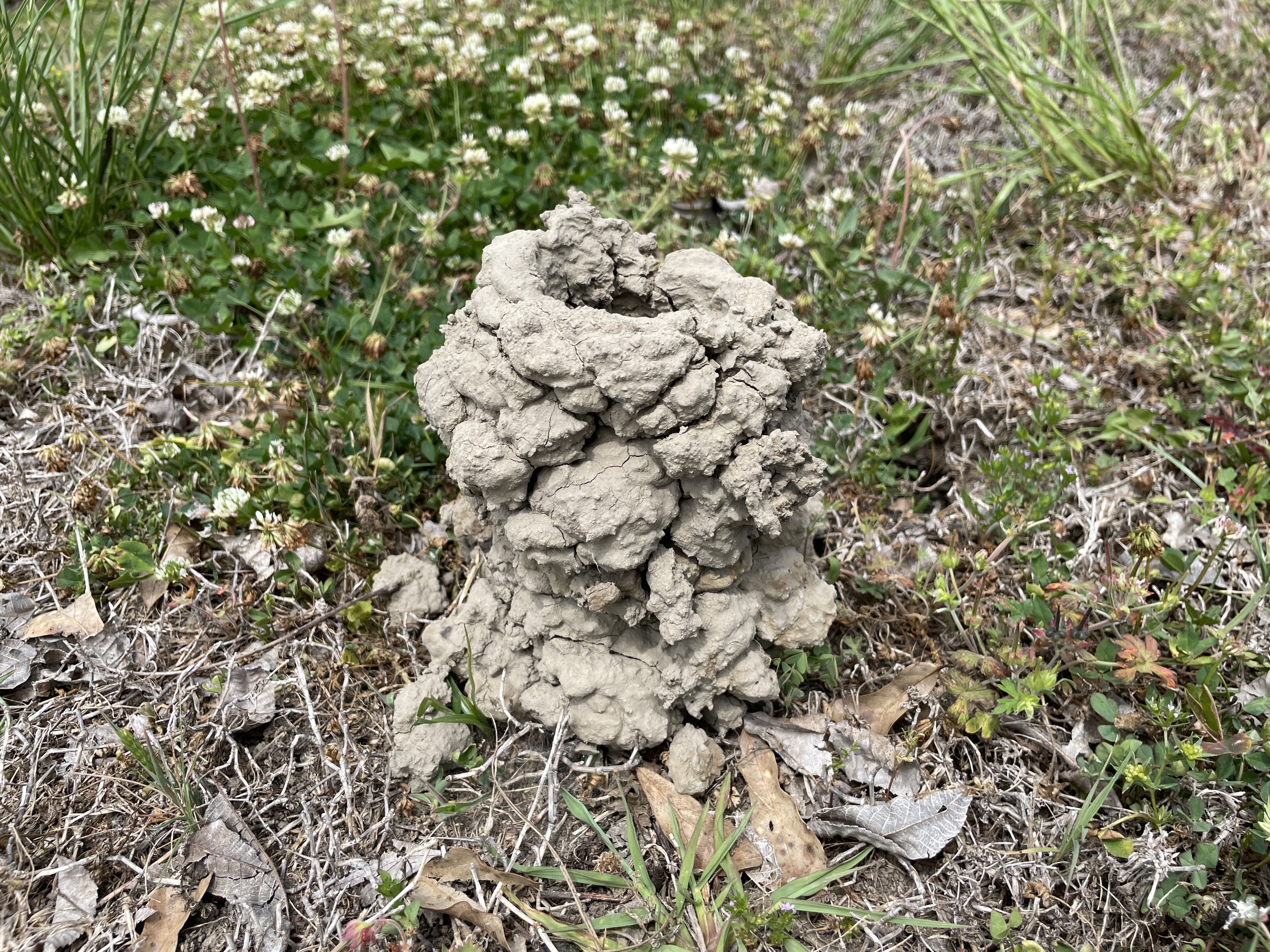
Crayfish mound in Madison Parish, Louisiana.

The greatest diversity of crayfish species is found in southeastern North America, with over 330 species in 15 genera, all in the family Cambaridae. A further genus of astacid crayfish is found in the Pacific Northwest and the headwaters of some rivers east of the Continental Divide. Many crayfish are also found in lowland areas where the water is abundant in calcium, and oxygen rises from underground springs. Crayfish are also found in some non-coastal wetlands; eight species of crayfish live in Iowa, for example.

In 1983, Louisiana designated the crayfish, commonly called crawfish there, as its official state crustacean. Louisiana produces 100 million pounds (45 million kilograms) of crayfish per year with the red swamp and white river crayfish being the main species harvested. Crayfish are a part of Cajun culture dating back hundreds of years. A variety of cottage industries have developed as a result of commercialized crayfish iconography. Their products include crayfish attached to wooden plaques, T-shirts with crayfish logos, and crayfish pendants, earrings, and necklaces made of gold or silver.

=== Australia ===
Australia has over 100 species in a dozen genera. It is home to the world's three largest freshwater crayfish:

- the Tasmanian giant freshwater crayfish Astacopsis gouldi, which can achieve a mass over 5 kg (11 lb) and is found in rivers of northern Tasmania
- the Murray crayfish Euastacus armatus, which can reach 2.5 kg (5.5 lb), although reports of animals up to 3 kg (6.6 lb) have been made. It is found in much of the southern Murray-Darling basin.
- the marron from Western Australia (now believed to be two species, Cherax tenuimanus and C. cainii) which may reach 2.2 kg (4.9 lb)

Many of the better-known Australian crayfish are of the genus Cherax, and include the common yabby (C. destructor), western yabby (C. preissii), and red-claw crayfish (C. quadricarinatus).

The marron species C. tenuimanus is critically endangered, while other large Australasian crayfish are threatened or endangered.

=== New Zealand ===
In New Zealand, two species of Paranephrops are endemic, and are known by the Māori name kōura.

=== Other animals ===
In Australia, New Zealand, and South Africa, the term "crayfish" or "cray" generally refers to a saltwater spiny lobster, of the genus Jasus that is indigenous to much of southern Oceania, while the freshwater species are usually called yabbies or kōura, from the indigenous Australian and Māori names for the animal, respectively, or by other names specific to each species. Exceptions include western rock lobster (of the Palinuridae family) found on the west coast of Australia (it is a spiny lobster, but not of Jasus); the Tasmanian giant freshwater crayfish (from the Parastacidae family and therefore a true crayfish) found only in Tasmania; and the Murray crayfish found along Australia's Murray River.

In Singapore, the term crayfish typically refers to Thenus orientalis, a seawater crustacean from the slipper lobster family. True crayfish are not native to Singapore, but are commonly found as pets, or as an invasive species (Cherax quadricarinatus) in the many water catchment areas, and are alternatively known as freshwater lobsters.

In the United Kingdom and Ireland, the terms crayfish or crawfish commonly refer to the European spiny lobster, a saltwater species found in much of the East Atlantic and Mediterranean. The only true crayfish species native to the British Isles is the endangered white clawed crayfish.

== Fossil record ==
Fossil burrows very similar in construction to those of modern crayfish and likely produced by early crayfish are known from the Early Permian (~300-270 million years ago) of equatorial Pangea, in what is now North America (Washington Formation), and Europe (Sardinia). The oldest body fossils assigned to crayfish are known from the Late Triassic (~230-200 million years ago) Chinle Formation of North America, assigned to the species "Enoploclytia" porteri and Camborygma eumekenomos, which are not assigned to any modern families. An indeterminate member of the modern family Cambaridae is known from the Late Jurassic Morrison Formation of North America. The earliest records of other modern families date to the Early Cretaceous, including the parastacid Palaeoechinastacus from Australia which is 115 million years old, the cambaroidid Palaeocambarus from the Yixian Formation of China which is likely around 120 million years old (Barremian-Aptian), and the astacid "Austropotamobius" llopisi from the Las Hoyas site in Spain (Barremian).

== Threats to crayfish ==
Crayfish are susceptible to infections such as crayfish plague and to environmental stressors including acidification. In Europe, they are particularly threatened by crayfish plague, which is caused by the North American water mold Aphanomyces astaci. This water mold was transmitted to Europe when North American species of crayfish were introduced. Species of the genus Astacus are particularly susceptible to infection, allowing the plague-coevolved signal crayfish (native to western North America) to invade parts of Europe.

Acid rain can cause problems for crayfish across the world. In whole-ecosystem experiments simulating acid rain at the Experimental Lakes Area in Ontario, Canada, crayfish populations crashed – probably because their exoskeletons are weaker in acidified environments.

== Invasive pest ==
In several countries, particularly in Europe, native species of crayfish are under threat by imported species, particularly the signal crayfish (Pacifastacus leniusculus). Crayfish are also considered an invasive predatory species, endangering native European species such as the Italian agile frog and the painted frog in Malta.

== Uses ==
Human uses

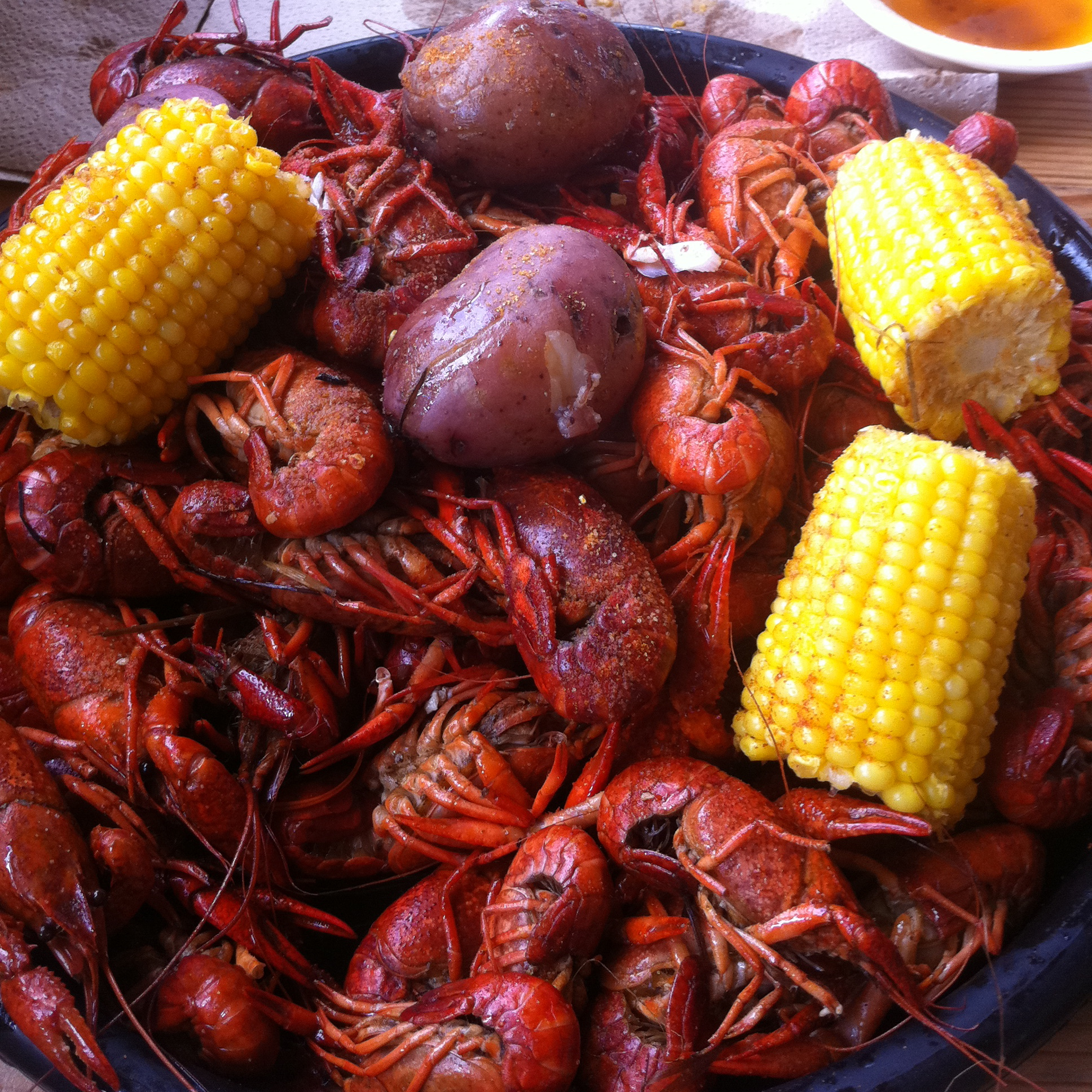
Crayfish, boiled with potatoes and corn

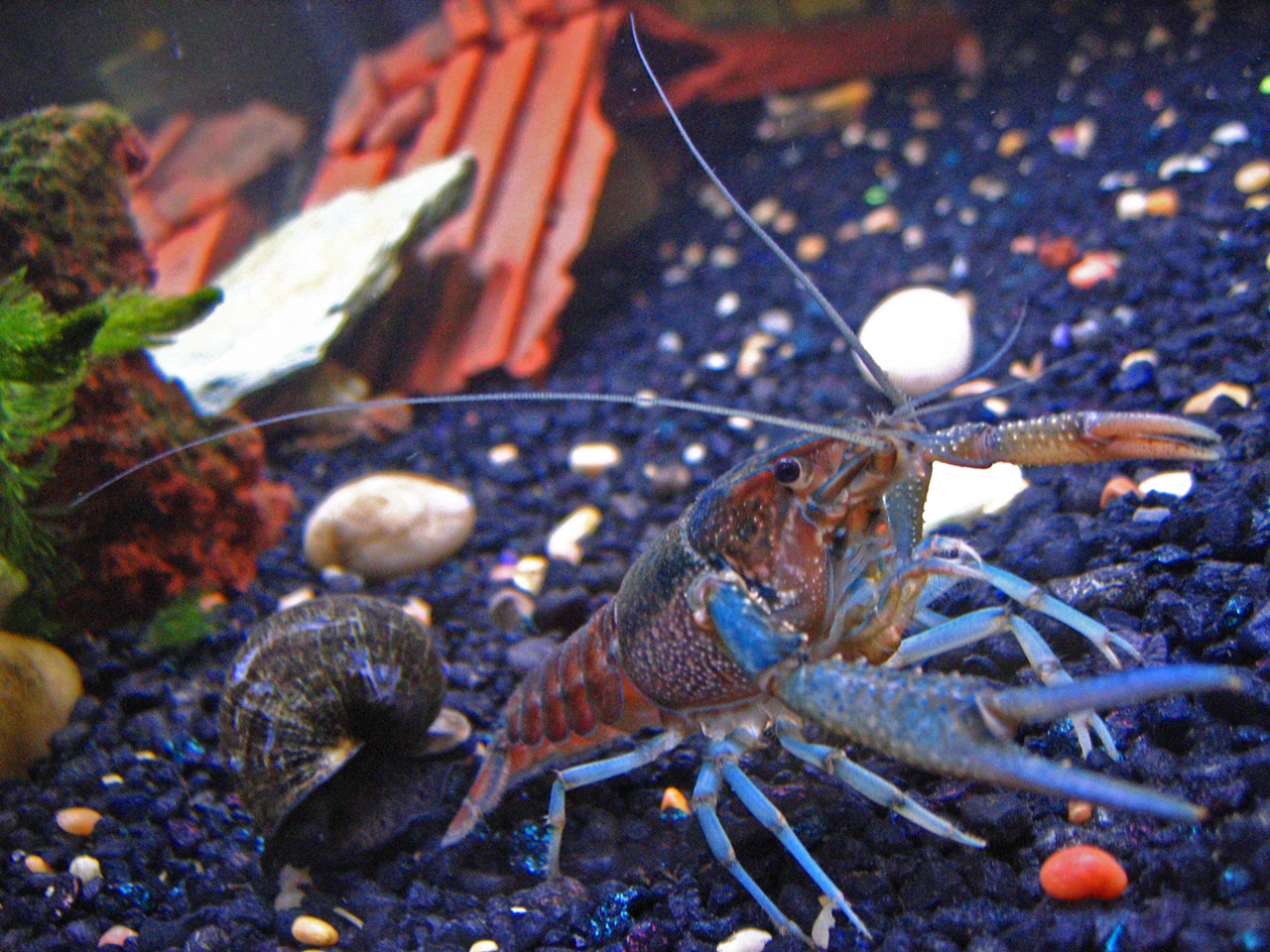
A pet crayfish, Procambarus clarkii in a freshwater aquarium

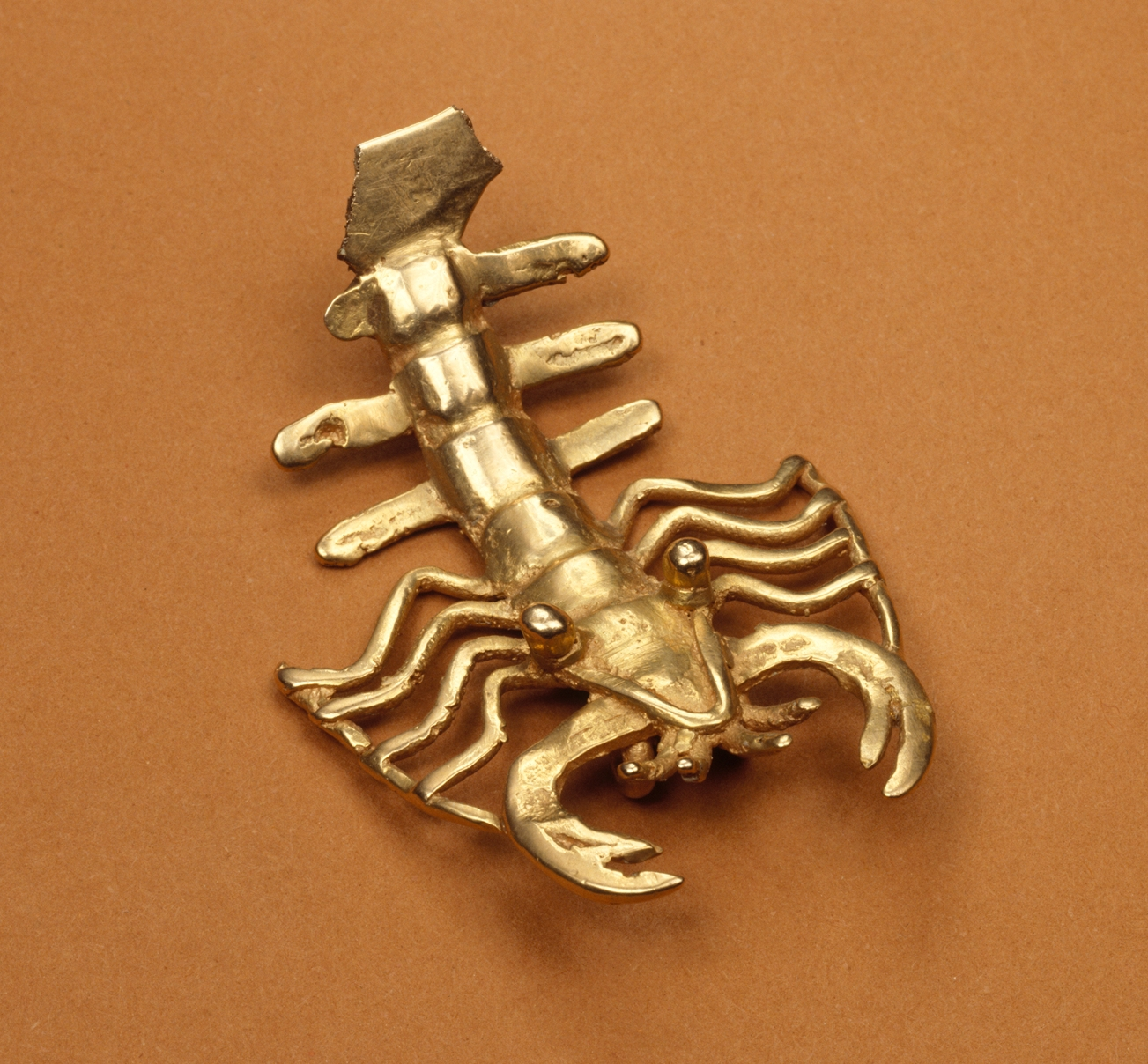
Golden crayfish pendant, Veraguas culture, Chiriqui, Panama, c. 11th to 16th century AD

=== Culinary use ===
Crayfish are eaten worldwide. Like other edible crustaceans, only a small portion of the body of a crayfish is eaten. In most prepared dishes, such as soups, bisques and étouffées, only the tail portion is served. At crayfish boils or other meals where the entire body of the crayfish is presented, other portions, such as the claw meat, may be eaten.

Research shows that crayfish do not die immediately when boiled alive, and respond to pain in a similar way to mammals. Then the stress hormone cortisol is released and this leads to the formation of lactic acid in the muscles, which makes the meat taste sour. Crayfish can be cooked more humanely by first freezing them unconscious for a few hours, then destroying the central nervous system along their abdomen by cutting the crayfish lengthwise with a long knife down the center of the crayfish before cooking it.

Global crayfish production is centered in Asia, primarily China. In 2018, Asian production accounted for 95% of the world's crayfish supply.

Crayfish is part of Swedish cuisine and is usually eaten in August at special crayfish parties (Swedish: Kräftskiva). Documentation of the consumption of crayfish dates to at least the 16th century. On the Swedish west coast, Nephrops norvegicus (Havskräfta, lit. 'sea crayfish') is more commonly eaten while various freshwater crayfish are consumed in the rest of the country. Prior to the 1960s, crayfish was largely inaccessible to the urban population in Sweden and consumption was largely limited to the upper classes or farmers holding fishing rights in fresh water lakes. With the introduction of import of frozen crayfish the crayfish party is now widely practiced across all spheres in Sweden and among the Swedish-speaking population of Finland.

In the United States, crayfish production is strongly centered in Louisiana, with 93% of crayfish farms located in the state as of 2018. In 1987, Louisiana produced 90% of the crayfish harvested in the world, 70% of which were consumed locally. In 2007, the Louisiana crayfish harvest was about 54,800 tons, almost all of it from aquaculture. About 70–80% of crayfish produced in Louisiana are Procambarus clarkii (red swamp crayfish), with the remaining 20–30% being Procambarus zonangulus (white river crayfish). Optimum dietary nutritional requirement of freshwater crayfish, or crayfish nutrient specifications are now available for aquaculture feed producers

Like all crustaceans, crayfish are not kosher because they are aquatic animals that do not have both fins and scales. They are therefore not eaten by observant Jews, and some Christian denominations.

=== Bait ===
Crayfish are preyed upon by a variety of ray-finned fishes, and are commonly used as bait, either live or with only the tail meat. (Note: Crayfish are also a common imitation for artificial baits; Soft plastics such as the Strike King "Rage Craw", Yum "Craw Chunk" and Z-Man TRD "CrawZ". As well as Hard baits.) They are a popular bait for catching catfish, largemouth bass, smallmouth bass, striped bass, perch, pike and muskie. When using live crayfish as bait, anglers prefer to hook them between the eyes, piercing through their hard, pointed beak which causes them no harm; therefore, they remain more active.

When using crayfish as bait, it is important to fish in the same environment where they were caught. An Illinois State University report that focused on studies conducted on the Fox River and Des Plaines River watershed stated that rusty crayfish, initially caught as bait in a different environment, were dumped into the water and "outcompeted the native clearwater crayfish". Other studies confirmed that transporting crayfish to different environments has led to various ecological problems, including the elimination of native species. Transporting crayfish as live bait has also contributed to the spread of zebra mussels in various waterways throughout Europe and North America, as they are known to attach themselves to exoskeleton of crayfishes.

=== Pets ===
Crayfish are kept as pets in freshwater aquariums. They prefer foods like shrimp pellets or various vegetables, but will also eat tropical fish food, regular fish food, algae wafers, and small fish that can be captured with their claws. A report by the National Park Service as well as video and anecdotal reports by aquarium owners indicate that crayfish will eat their moulted exoskeleton "to recover the calcium and phosphates contained in it." As omnivores, crayfish will eat almost anything; therefore, they may explore the edibility of aquarium plants in a fish tank. However, most species of dwarf crayfish, such as Cambarellus patzcuarensis, will not destructively dig or eat live aquarium plants.

In some nations, such as the United Kingdom, United States, Australia, and New Zealand, imported alien crayfish are a danger to local rivers. The three most widespread American species invasive in Europe are Faxonius limosus, Pacifastacus leniusculus and Procambarus clarkii. Crayfish may spread into different bodies of water because specimens captured for pets in one river are often released into a different catchment. There is a potential for ecological damage when crayfish are introduced into non-native bodies of water: e.g., crayfish plague in Europe, or the introduction of the common yabby (Cherax destructor) into drainages east of the Great Dividing Range in Australia.

=== Education ===
Some public schools in the United States keep live crayfish in the classroom and have the students take care of them in order to give the students a greater understanding of the creatures.

=== Sentinel species ===
The Protivin brewery in the Czech Republic uses crayfish outfitted with sensors to detect any changes in their bodies or pulse activity in order to monitor the purity of the water used in their product. The creatures are kept in a fish tank that is fed with the same local natural source water used in their brewing. If three or more of the crayfish have changes to their pulses, employees know there is a change in the water and examine the parameters.

Scientists also monitor crayfish in the wild in natural bodies of water to study the levels of pollutants there. This use makes crayfish an indicator species.

== See also ==
- Arthropods in culture
- Pain in crustaceans
- Lobster
