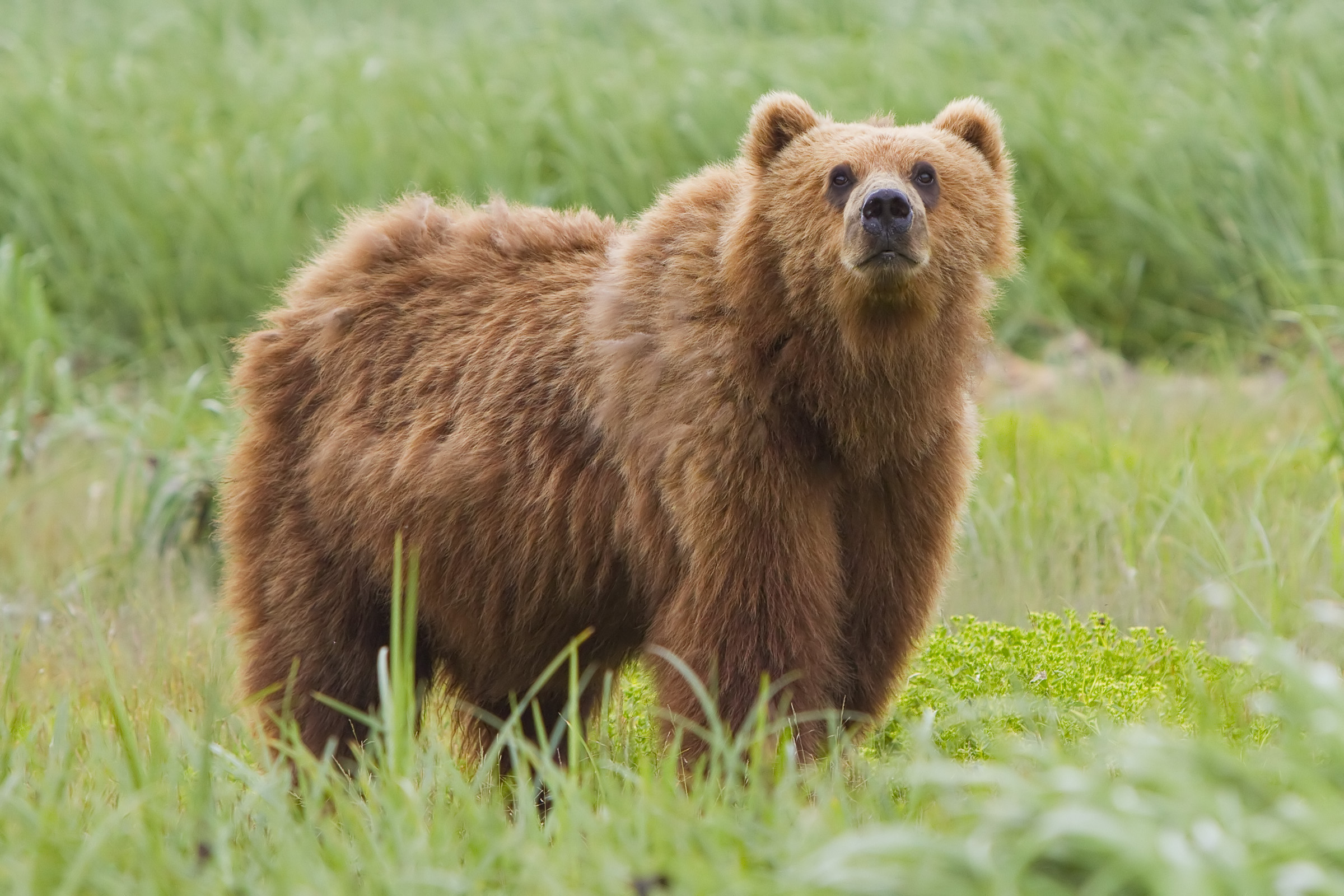
- Kodiak bear on Kodiak Island

Conservation status
- Least Concern (IUCN 3.1)
- CITES Appendix II (Note: Populations of Bhutan, China, Mexico and Mongolia are included in Appendix I. All other populations are included in Appendix II.)

Scientific classification
- Kingdom: Animalia
- Phylum: Chordata
- Class: Mammalia
- Order: Carnivora
- Family: Ursidae
- Genus: Ursus
- Species: U. arctos

Binomial name
- Ursus arctos Linnaeus, 1758

Subspecies
- 15, see text and article
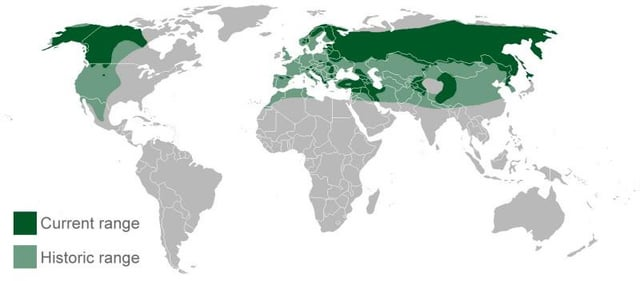
- Dark green: current; light green: historical

= Brown bear =

Brown bear Temporal range: 0.5–0 Ma Middle Pleistocene-Holocene

Large bear native to Eurasia and North America

The brown bear (Ursus arctos) is a large bear native to Eurasia and North America. Of the land carnivorans, it is rivaled in size only by its closest relative, the polar bear, which is much less variable in size and slightly bigger on average. The brown bear is a sexually dimorphic species, as adult males are larger and more compactly built than females. The fur ranges in color from cream to reddish to dark brown. It has evolved large hump muscles, unique among bears, and paws up to 21 cm (8.3 in) wide and 36 cm (14 in) long, to effectively dig through dirt. Its teeth are similar to those of other bears and reflect its dietary plasticity.

Throughout the brown bear's range, it inhabits mainly forested habitats in elevations of up to 5,000 m (16,000 ft). It is omnivorous and consumes a variety of plant and animal species. Contrary to popular belief, the brown bear derives 90% of its diet from plants. When hunting, it will target animals as small as insects and rodents to those as large as moose or muskoxen. In parts of coastal Alaska, brown bears predominantly feed on spawning salmon that come near shore to lay their eggs. For most of the year, it is a solitary animal that associates only when mating or raising cubs. Females give birth to an average of one to three cubs that remain with their mother for 1.5 to 4.5 years. It is a long-lived animal, with an average lifespan of 25 years in the wild. Attacks on humans, though widely reported, are generally rare.

While the brown bear's range has shrunk, and it has faced local extinctions across its wide range, it remains listed as a least concern species by the International Union for Conservation of Nature (IUCN) with a total estimated population in 2017 of 110,000. Populations that were hunted to extinction in the 19th and 20th centuries are the Atlas bear of North Africa and the Californian, Ungavan and Mexican populations of the grizzly bear of North America. Many of the populations in the southern parts of Eurasia are highly endangered as well. One of the smaller-bodied forms, the Himalayan brown bear, is critically endangered: it occupies only 2% of its former range and is threatened by uncontrolled poaching for its body parts. The Marsican brown bear of central Italy is one of several currently isolated populations of the Eurasian brown bear and is believed to have a population of only about 50 bears.

The brown bear is considered to be one of the most popular of the world's charismatic megafauna. It has been kept in zoos since ancient times, and has been tamed and trained to perform in circuses and other acts. For thousands of years, the brown bear has had a role in human culture, and is often featured in literature, art, folklore, and mythology.

== Etymology ==
The brown bear is sometimes referred to as the bruin, from Middle English. This name originated in the fable History of Reynard the Fox, translated by William Caxton, from the Middle Dutch word bruun or bruyn, meaning "brown". In the mid-19th-century United States, the brown bear was given the nicknames "Old Ephraim" and "Moccasin Joe".

The scientific name of the brown bear, Ursus arctos, comes from the Latin ursus, meaning "bear", and the Greek ἄρκτος/arktos, also meaning "bear".

== Evolution and taxonomy ==
=== Taxonomy and subspecies ===
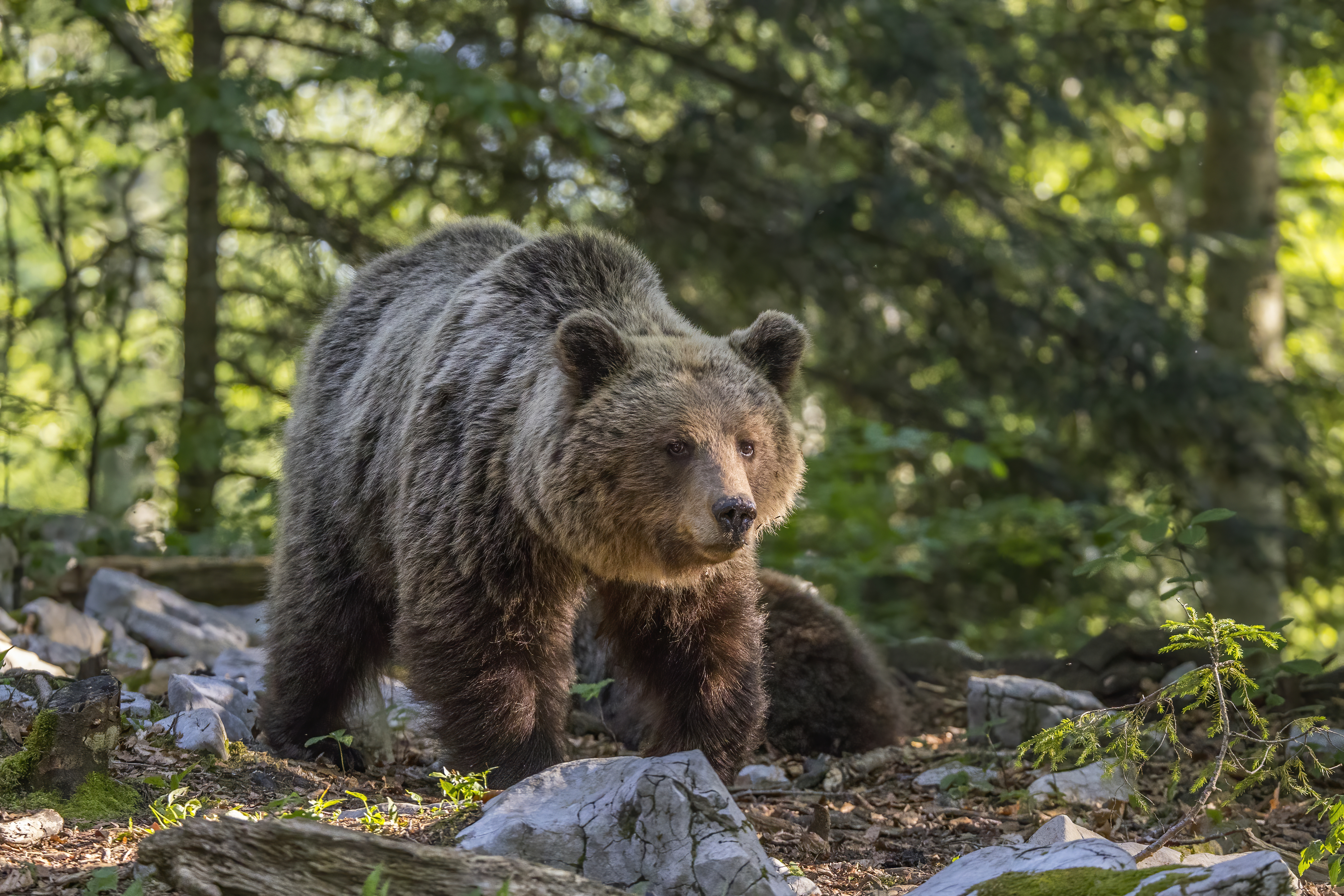
Adult female Eurasian brown bear, the nominate subspecies

Carl Linnaeus scientifically described the species under the name Ursus arctos in the 1758 edition of Systema Naturae. Brown bear taxonomy and subspecies classification has been described as "formidable and confusing", with few authorities listing the same set of subspecies. There are hundreds of obsolete brown-bear subspecies. As many as 90 subspecies have been proposed. A 2008 DNA analysis identified as few as five main clades, which comprise all extant brown bear species, while a 2017 phylogenetic study revealed nine clades, including one representing polar bears. In 2005, 15 extant, or recently extinct, subspecies were recognized by the general scientific community.

DNA analysis shows that, apart from recent, human-caused population fragmentation, brown bears in North America are generally part of a single interconnected population system, with the exception of the population (or subspecies) in the Kodiak Archipelago, which has probably been isolated since the end of the last Ice Age. These data demonstrate that U. a. gyas, U. a. horribilis, U. a. sitkensis, and U. a. stikeenensis are not distinct or cohesive groups, and would more accurately be described as ecotypes. For example, brown bears in any particular region of the Alaska coast are more closely related to adjacent grizzly bears than to distant populations of brown bears.

The history of the bears of the Alexander Archipelago is unusual in that these island populations carry polar bear DNA, presumably originating from a population of polar bears that was left behind at the end of the Pleistocene, but have since been connected with adjacent mainland populations through the movement of males, to the point where their nuclear genomes indicate more than 90% brown bear ancestry. MtDNA analysis revealed that brown bears are apparently divided into five different clades, some of which coexist or co-occur in different regions.

=== Evolution ===
The brown bear is one of eight extant species in the bear family Ursidae and of six extant species in the subfamily Ursinae. One possible phylogeny is based on complete mitochondrial DNA sequences from Yu et al. (2007). The polar bear and the brown bear form a close grouping, while the relationships of the other species are not very well resolved.

- Ursidae
  - Giant panda (Ailuropoda melanoleuca)
  - - Spectacled bear (Tremarctos ornatus)
    - - Ursinae
        - Sloth bear (Melursus ursinus)
        - - - Sun bear (Helarctos malayanus)
            - - Asian black bear (Ursus thibetanus)
              - American black bear (Ursus americanus)
          - - Polar bear (Ursus maritimus)
            - Brown bear (Ursus arctos)

A more recent phylogeny is based on the genetic study of Kumar et al. (2017). It concludes that Ursine bears originated around five million years ago, with extensive hybridization among the different species.

- Ursidae
  - Giant panda (Ailuropoda melanoleuca)
  - - Spectacled bear (Tremarctos ornatus)
    - Ursinae
      - - - Sloth bear (Melursus ursinus)
          - Sun bear (Helarctos malayanus)
        - Asian black bear (Ursus thibetanus)
      - - American black bear (Ursus americanus)
        - - Polar bear (Ursus maritimus)
          - Brown bear (Ursus arctos)

The brown bear is thought to have evolved from the Etruscan bear (Ursus etruscus) in Asia during the early Pliocene. A genetic analysis indicated that the brown bear lineage diverged from the cave bear species-complex approximately 1.2–1.4 million years ago, but did not clarify if U. savini persisted as a paraspecies for the brown bear before perishing. The oldest brown bear fossils occur in Asia from about 500,000 to 300,000 years ago. They entered Europe 250,000 years ago and North Africa shortly after. Brown bear remains from the Pleistocene period are common in the British Isles, where, amongst other factors, they may have contributed to the extinction of cave bears (Ursus spelaeus).

Brown bears first emigrated to North America from Eurasia via Beringia during the Illinoian Glaciation. Genetic evidence suggests that several brown bear populations migrated into North America, aligning with the glacial cycles of the Pleistocene. The founding population of most North American brown bears arrived first, with the genetic lineage developing around ~177,000 BP. Genetic divergences suggest that brown bears first migrated south during MIS-5 (~92,000–83,000 BP), upon the opening of the ice-free corridor. After a local extinction in Beringia ~33,000 BP, two new but closely related lineages repopulated Alaska and northern Canada from Eurasia after the Last Glacial Maximum (>25,000 BP).

Brown-bear fossils discovered in Ontario, Ohio, Kentucky, and Labrador show that the species occurred farther east than indicated in historic records. In North America, two types of the subspecies Ursus arctos horribilis are generally recognized—the coastal brown bear and the inland grizzly bear.

=== Hybrids ===
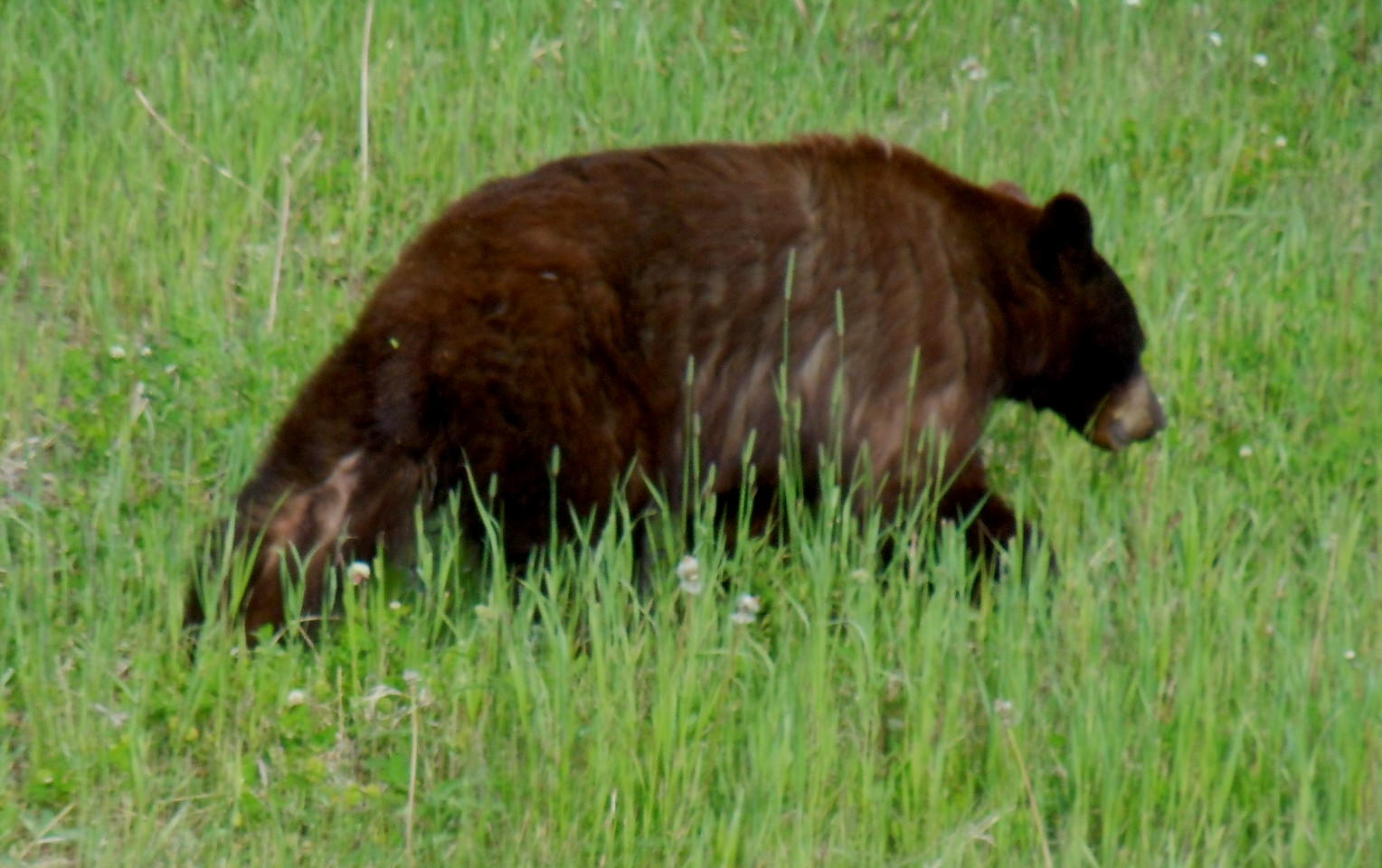
Possible grizzly–black bear hybrid in the Yukon Territory

A grizzly–polar bear hybrid is a rare ursid hybrid resulting from a crossbreeding of a brown bear with a polar bear. It has occurred both in captivity and in the wild. In 2006, the occurrence of this hybrid was confirmed by testing the DNA of a strange-looking bear that had been shot in the Canadian Arctic, and seven more hybrids have since been confirmed in the same region, all descended from a single female polar bear. Previously, the hybrid had been produced in zoos and was considered a "cryptid" (a hypothesized animal for which there is no scientific proof of existence in the wild). Analyses of the genomes of bears have shown that introgression between species was widespread during the evolution of the genus Ursus, including the introgression of polar-bear DNA introduced to brown bears during the Pleistocene.

== Description ==
=== Size ===
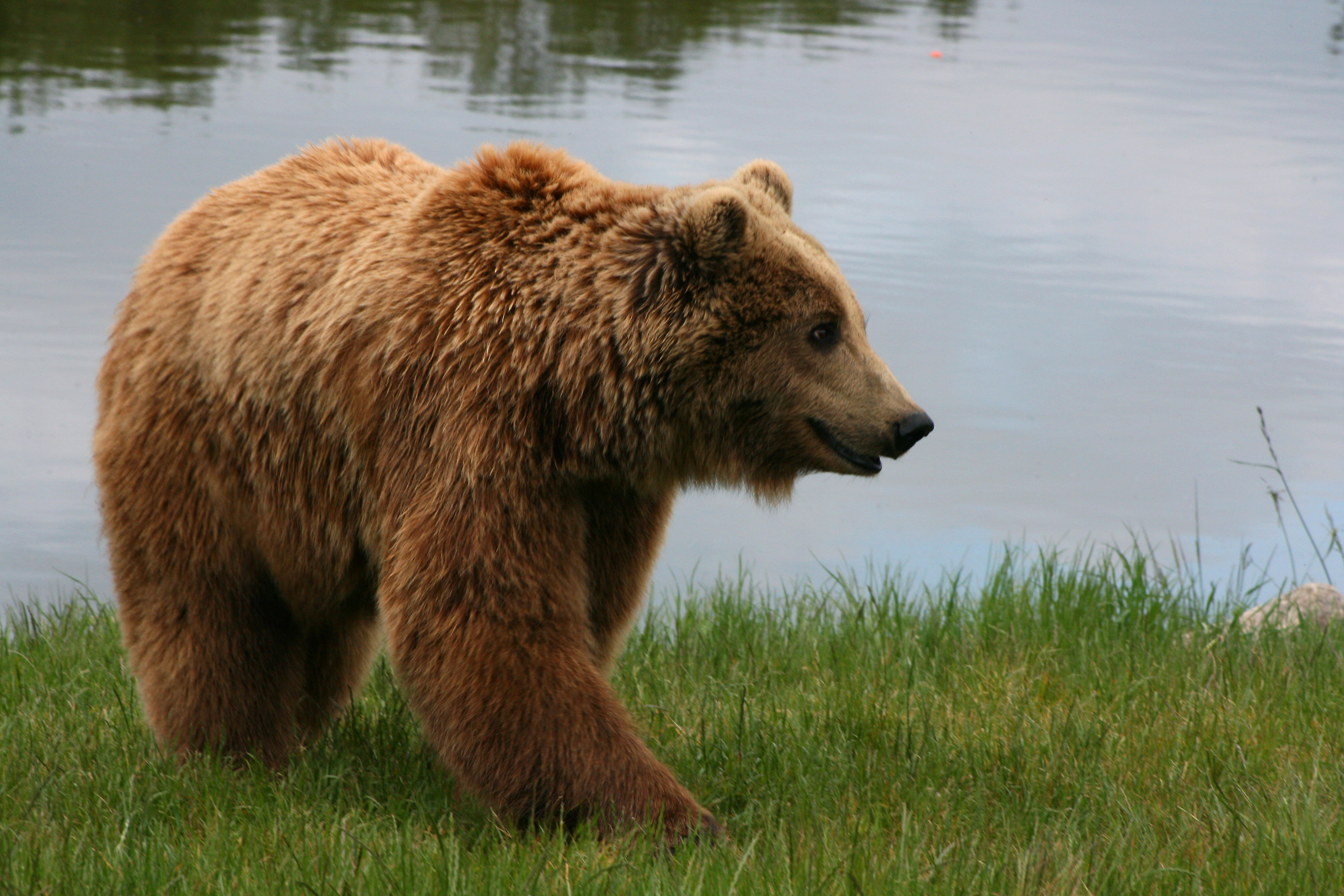
Brown bears are highly variable in size. Eurasian brown bears often fall around the middle to low sizes for the species.

The brown bear is the most variable in size of modern bears. The typical size depends upon which population it is from, as most accepted subtypes vary widely in size. This is in part due to sexual dimorphism, as male brown bears average at least 30% larger than females in most subtypes. Individual bears vary in size seasonally, weighing the least in spring due to lack of foraging during hibernation, and the most in late fall, after a period of hyperphagia to put on additional weight to prepare for hibernation.

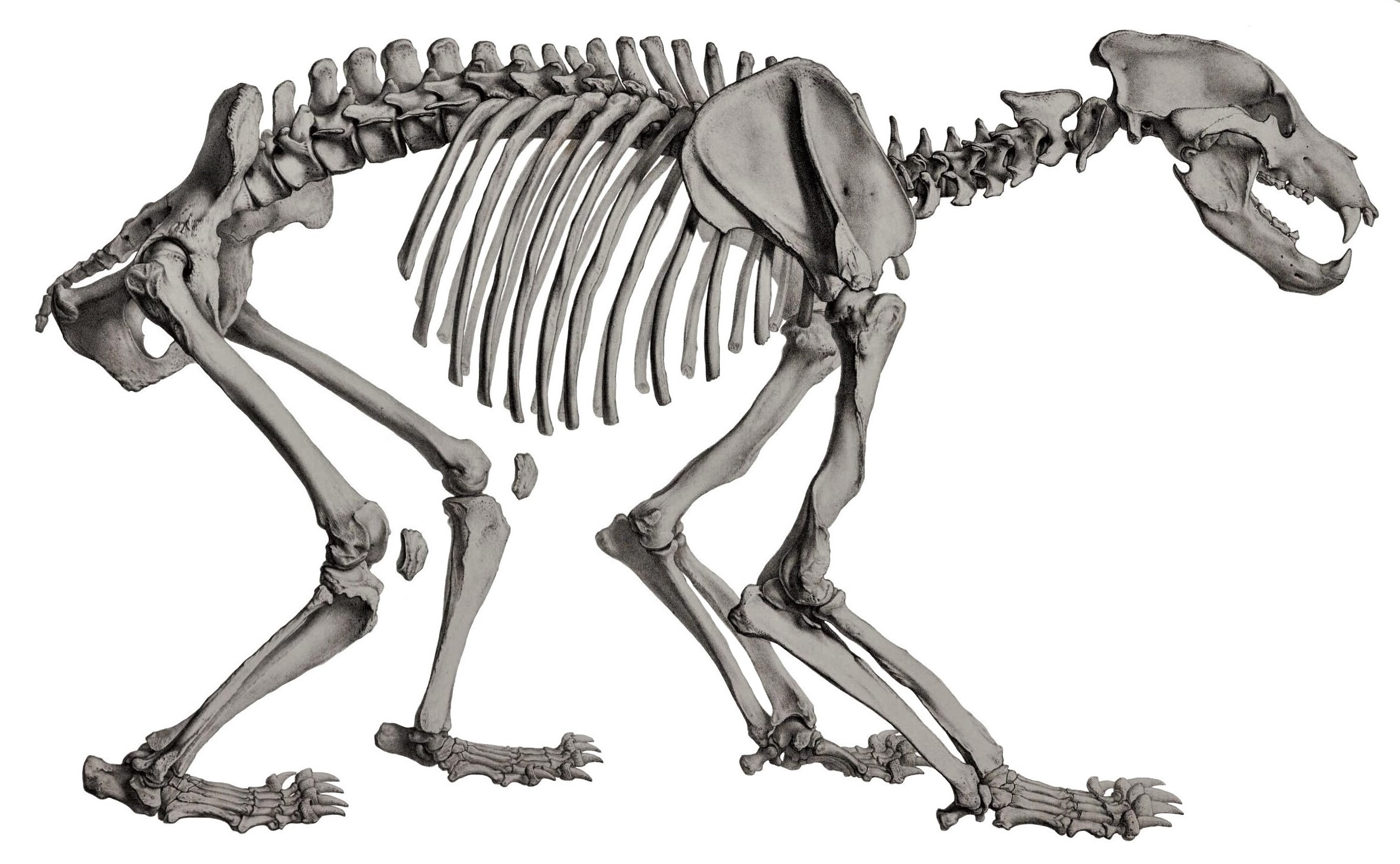
Brown bear skeleton

Brown bears generally weigh 80 to 600 kg (180 to 1,320 lb), with males outweighing females. They have a head-and-body length of 1 to 2.8 m (3 ft 3 in to 9 ft 2 in) and a shoulder height of 1.5 m (4 ft 11 in). The tail is relatively short, as in all bears, ranging from 6 to 22 cm (2.4 to 8.7 in) in length. The smallest brown bears, females during spring among barren-ground populations, can weigh so little as to roughly match the body mass of males of the smallest living bear species, the sun bear (Helarctos malayanus), while the largest coastal populations attain sizes broadly similar to those of the largest living bear species, the polar bear. Brown bears of the interior are generally smaller, being around the same weight as an average lion, at an average of 180 kg (400 lb) in males and 135 kg (298 lb) in females, whereas adults of the coastal populations weigh about twice as much. The average weight of adult male bears, from 19 populations, was found to be 217 kg (478 lb) while adult females from 24 populations were found to average 152 kg (335 lb).

=== Coloration ===
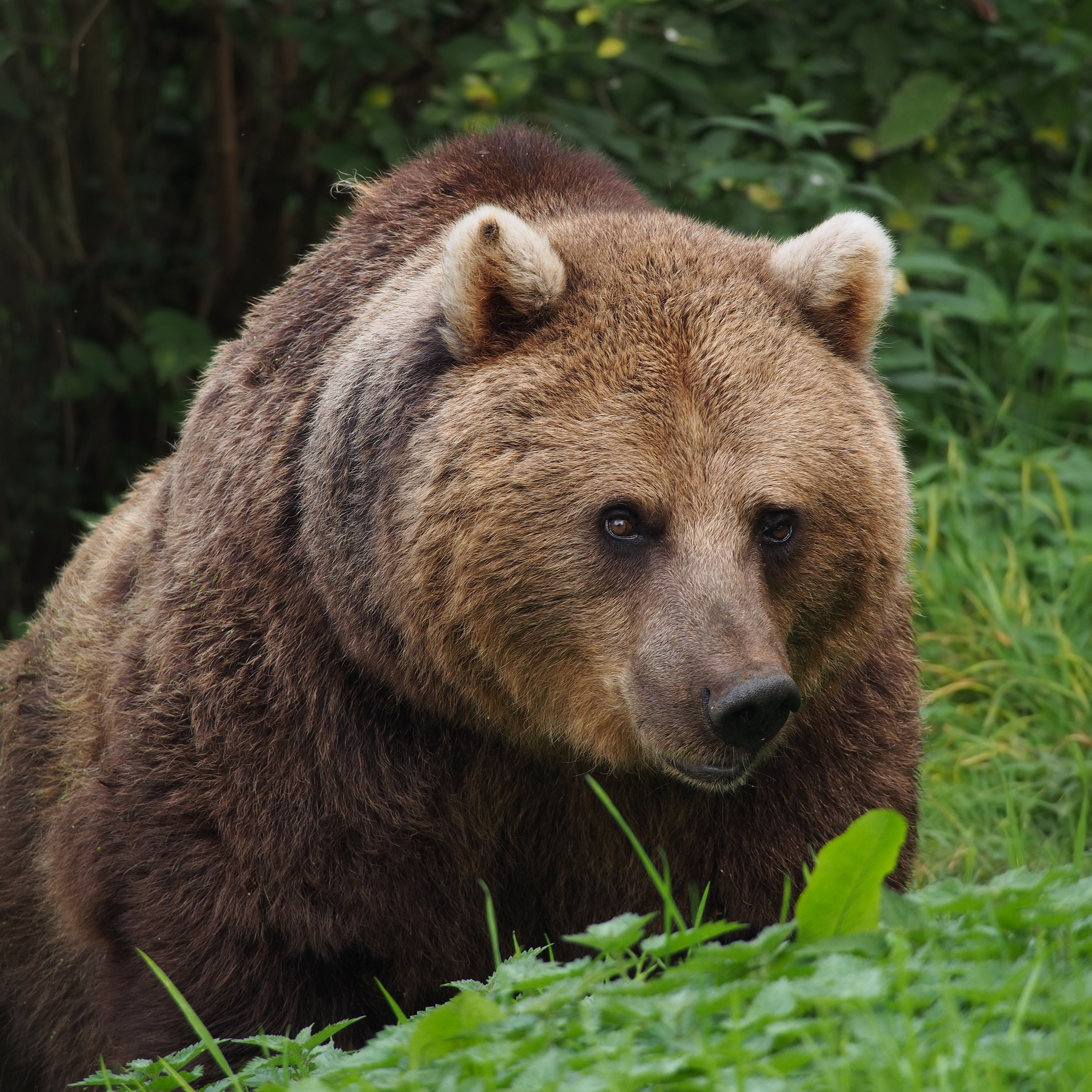
A brown bear at Whipsnade Zoo

Brown bears are often not fully brown. They have long, thick fur, with a moderately elongated mane at the back of the neck which varies somewhat across bear types. In India, brown bears can be reddish with silver-tipped hairs, while in China, brown bears are bicolored, with a yellowish-brown or whitish collar across the neck, chest, and shoulders. Even within well-defined subspecies, individuals may show highly variable hues of brown. North American grizzlies can be from dark brown (almost black) to cream (almost white) or yellowish-brown and often have darker-colored legs. The common name "grizzly" stems from their typical coloration, with the hairs on their back usually being brownish-black at the base and whitish-cream at the tips, giving them their distinctive "grizzled" color. Apart from the cinnamon subspecies of the American black bear (U. americanus cinnamonum), the brown bear is the only modern bear species to typically appear truly brown. The brown bear's winter fur is very thick and long, especially in northern subspecies, and can reach 11 to 12 cm (4.3 to 4.7 in) at the withers. The winter hairs are thin, yet rough to the touch. The summer fur is much shorter and sparser, with its length and density varying among geographic ranges.

=== Cranial morphology and size ===
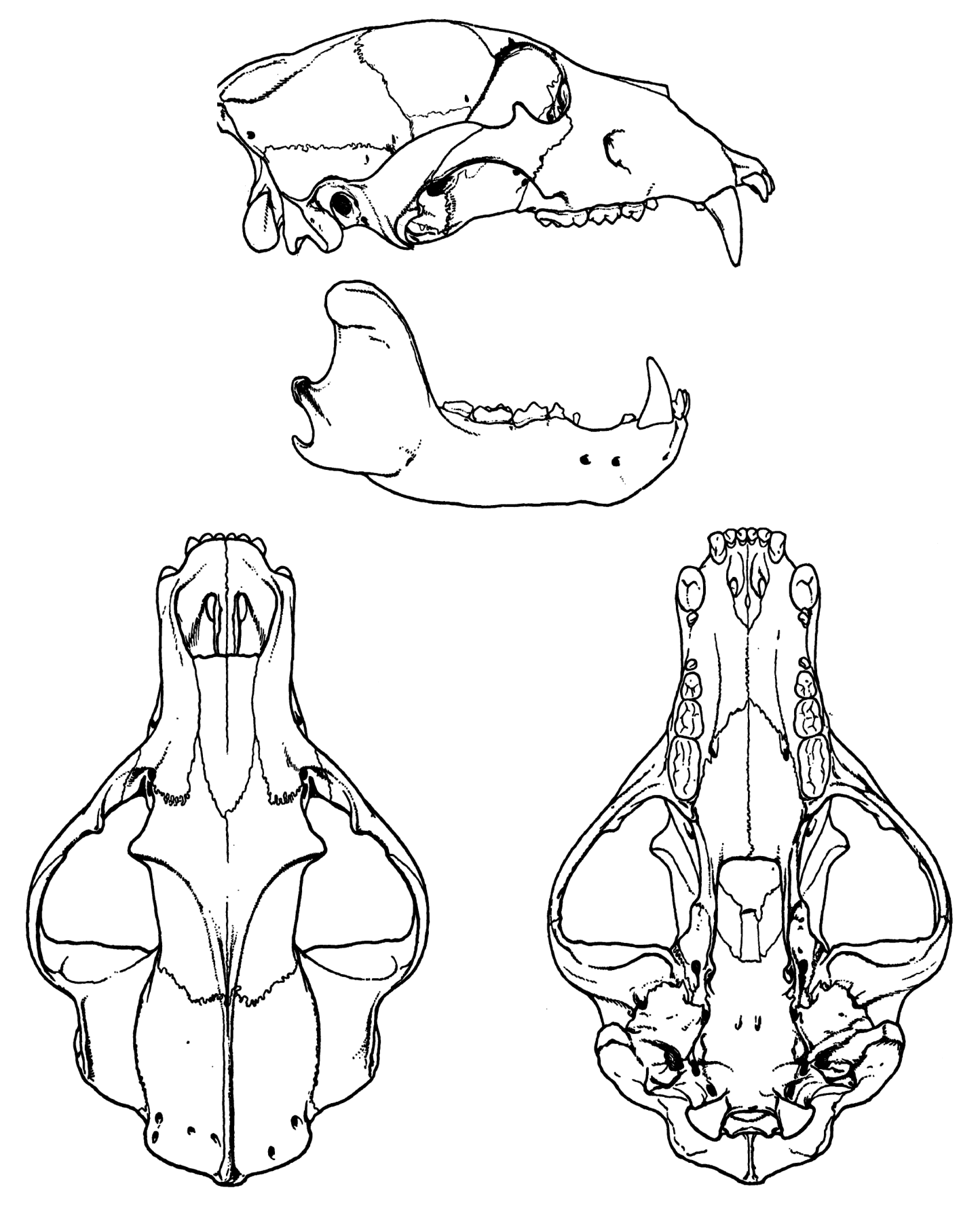
Skull: side view (top), upper view (left) and lower view (right)

Adults have massive, heavily built, concave skulls, which are large in proportion to the body. The projections of the skull are well developed. Skull lengths of Russian brown bears tend to be 31.5 to 45.5 cm (12.4 to 17.9 in) for males, and 27.5 to 39.7 cm (10.8 to 15.6 in) for females. Brown bears have the broadest skull of any extant ursine bear. The width of the zygomatic arches in males is 17.5 to 27.7 cm (6.9 to 10.9 in), and 14.7 to 24.7 cm (5.8 to 9.7 in) in females. Brown bears have strong jaws: the incisors and canine teeth are large, with the lower canines being strongly curved. The first three molars of the upper jaw are underdeveloped and single-crowned with one root. The second upper molar is smaller than the others, and is usually absent in adults. It is usually lost at an early age, leaving no trace of its alveolus in the jaw. The first three molars of the lower jaw are very weak, and are often lost at an early age. The teeth of brown bears reflect their dietary plasticity and are broadly similar to those of other bears. They are reliably larger than teeth of American black bears, but average smaller in molar length than those of polar bears.

=== Claws and feet ===
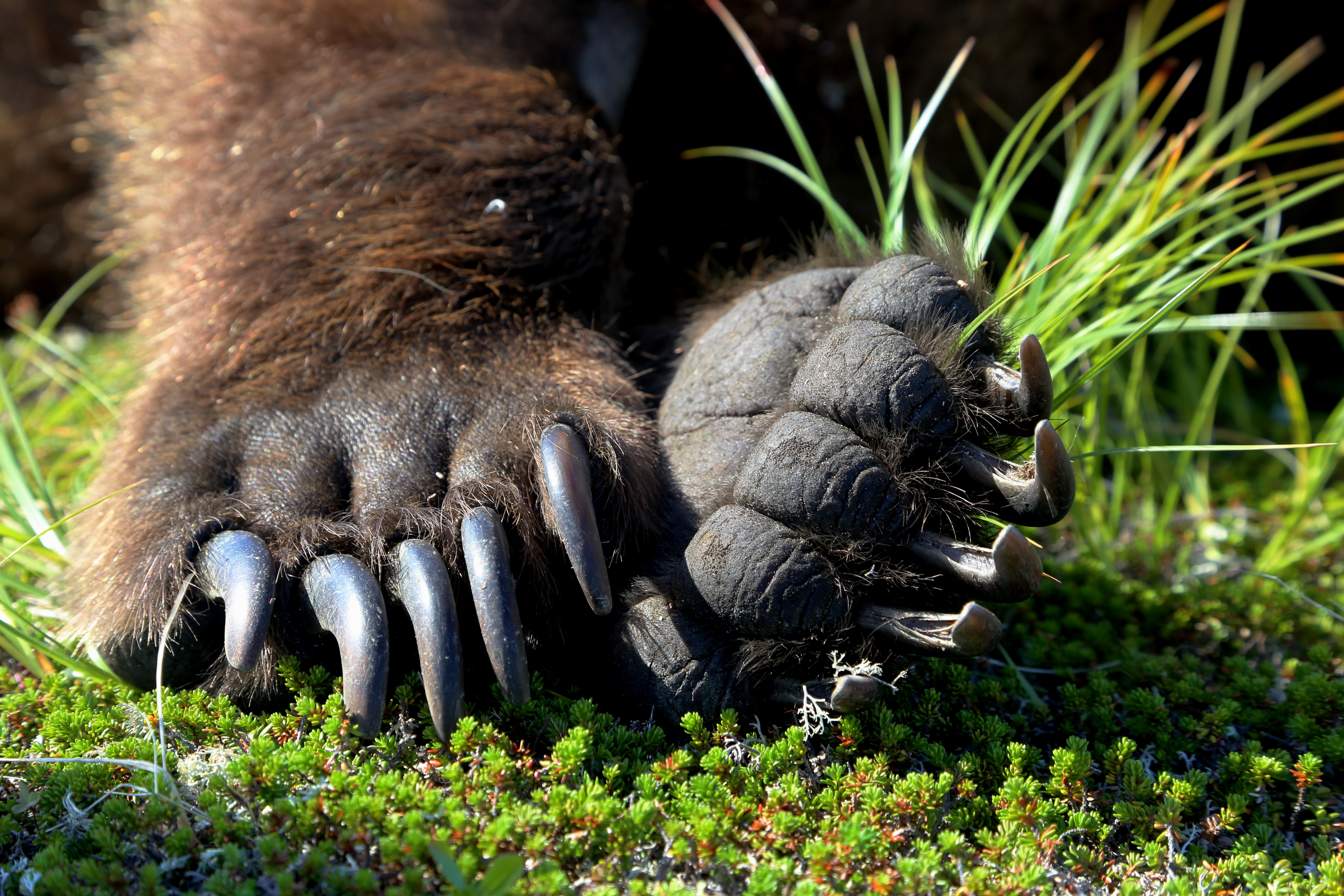
Front paws

Brown bears have large, curved claws, with the front ones being larger than the back. They may reach 5 to 6 cm (2.0 to 2.4 in) and measure 7 to 10 cm (2.8 to 3.9 in) along the curve. Compared with the American black bear (Ursus americanus), the brown bear has longer and stronger claws, with a blunt curve. Due to their claw structure, in addition to their excessive weight, adult brown bears are not able to climb trees as well as black bears. In rare cases adult female brown bears have been seen scaling trees. The claws of a polar bear are quite different, being notably shorter but broader with a strong curve and sharper point. The species has large paws; the rear feet measure 21 to 36 cm (8.3 to 14.2 in) long, while the forefeet tend to measure 40% less. Brown bears are the only extant bears with a hump at the top of their shoulder, which is made entirely of muscle. This feature developed presumably to impart more force in digging, which helps during foraging and facilitates den construction prior to hibernation.

== Distribution and habitat ==
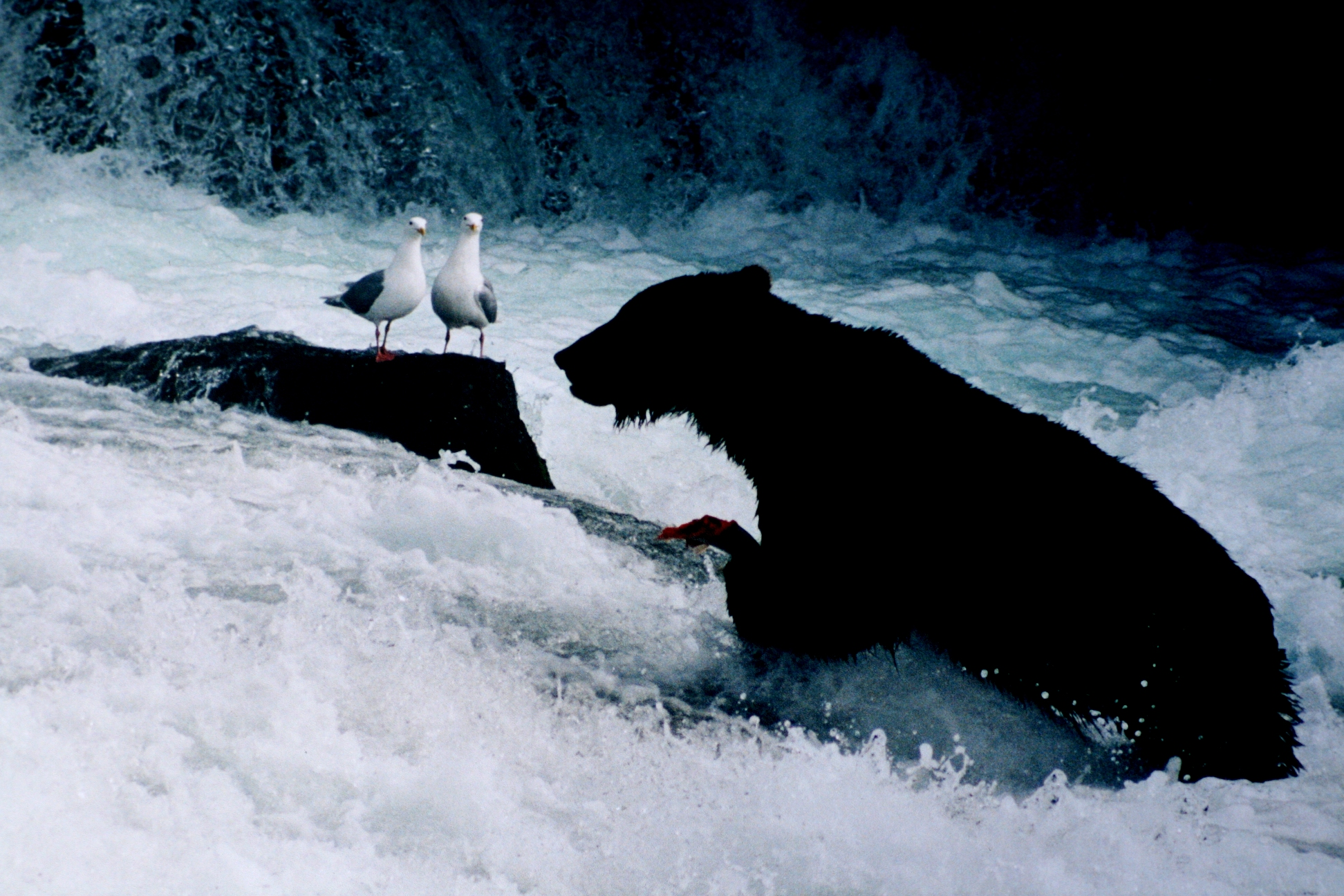
Brown bear at Brooks Falls

Brown bears inhabit the broadest range of habitats of any living bear species. They seem to have no altitudinal preferences and have been recorded from sea level to an elevation of 5,000 m (16,000 ft) in the Himalayas. In most of their range, brown bears seem to prefer semi-open country, with a scattering of vegetation, that can allow them a resting spot during the day. However, they have been recorded as inhabiting every variety of northern temperate forest known to occur.

This species was once native to Europe, much of Asia, the Atlas Mountains of Africa, and North America, but are now extirpated in some areas, and their populations have greatly decreased in other areas. There are approximately 200,000 brown bears left in the world. The largest populations are in Russia with 130,000, the United States with 32,500, and Canada with around 25,000. Brown bears live in Alaska, east through the Yukon and Northwest Territories, south through British Columbia, and through the western half of Alberta. The Alaskan population is estimated at a healthy 30,000 individuals. In the lower 48 states, they are repopulating slowly, but steadily along the Rockies and the western Great Plains.

In Europe, in 2010, there were 14,000 brown bears in ten fragmented populations, from Spain (estimated at only 20–25 animals in the Pyrenees in 2010, in a range shared between Spain, France, and Andorra, and some 210 animals in Asturias, Cantabria, Galicia, and León, in the Picos de Europa and adjacent areas in 2013) in the west, to Russia in the east, and from Sweden and Finland in the north to Romania (5,000–6,000), Bulgaria (900–1,200), Slovakia (with about 600–800 animals), Slovenia (500–700 animals), and Greece (with around 900 animals) in the south.

In Asia, brown bears are found primarily throughout Russia, thence more spottily southwest to parts of the Middle East, including the eastern Black Sea region of Turkey which has 5,432 brown bears, to as far south as southwestern Iran, and to the east in Northeast China. Brown bears are also found in Western China, Kyrgyzstan, North Korea, Pakistan, Afghanistan, and India. A population of brown bears can be found on the Japanese island of Hokkaido, which holds the largest number of non-Russian brown bears in eastern Asia, with about 2,000–3,000 animals.

=== Conservation status ===
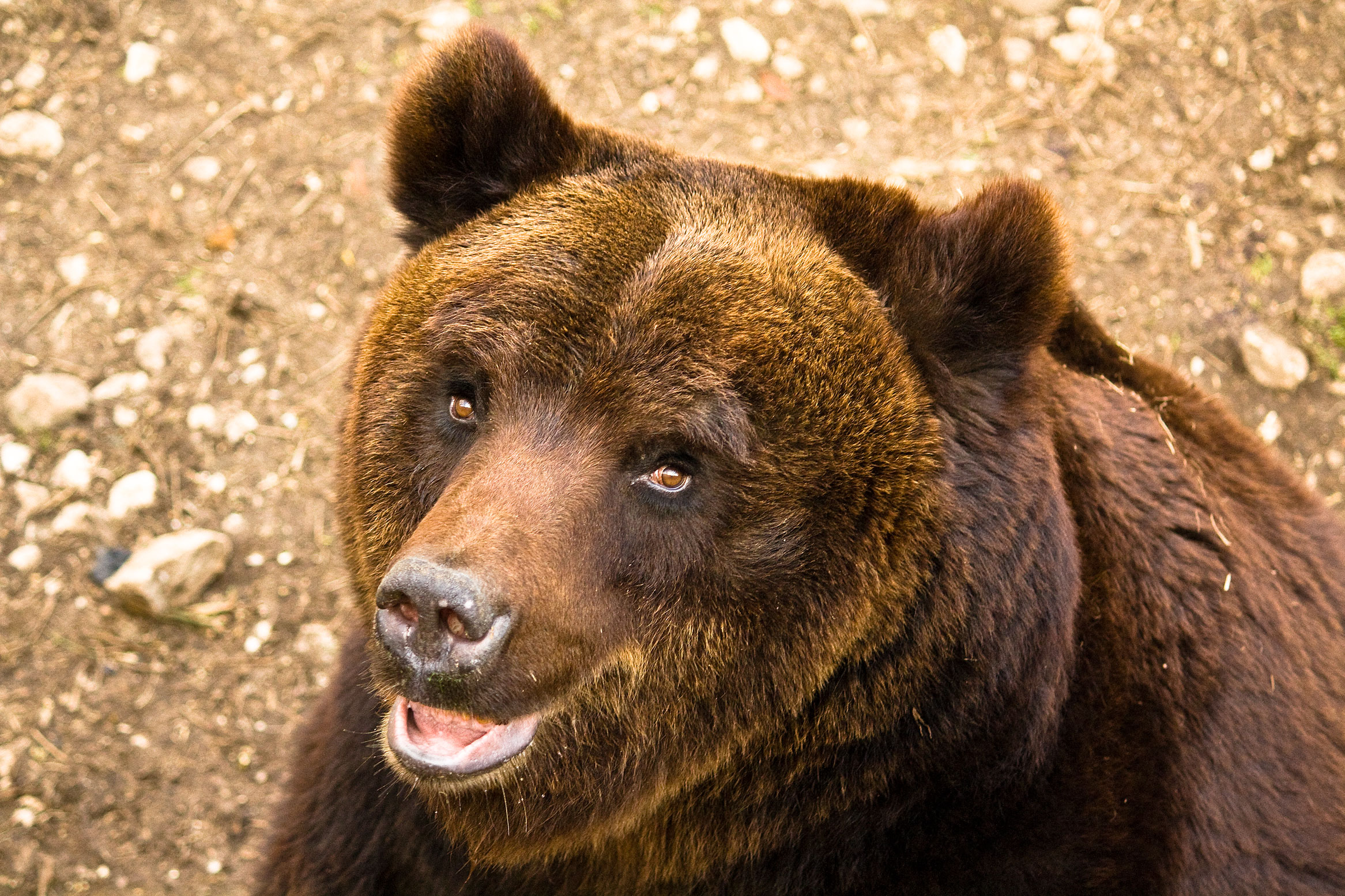
A Marsican brown bear, with a range restricted to the Abruzzo, Lazio and Molise National Park, Italy

While the brown bear's range has shrunk and it has faced local extinctions, it remains listed as a least-concern species by the IUCN, with a total population of approximately 200,000. As of 2012, the brown bear and the American black bear are the only bear species not classified as threatened by the IUCN. However, the California grizzly bear, Ungava brown bear, Atlas bear, and Mexican grizzly bear, as well as brown bear populations in the Pacific Northwest, were hunted to extinction in the 19th and early 20th centuries and many of the southern Asian subspecies are highly endangered. The Syrian brown bear (U. a. syriacus) is very rare and it has been extirpated from more than half of its historic range. One of the smallest-bodied subspecies, the Himalayan brown bear (U. a. isabellinus), is critically endangered: it occupies only 2% of its former range and is threatened by uncontrolled poaching for its body parts. The Marsican brown bear in central Italy is believed to have a population of just 50 bears.

The smallest populations are most vulnerable to habitat loss and fragmentation, whereas the largest are primarily threatened by overhunting. The use of land for agriculture may negatively effect brown bears. Additionally, roads and railway tracks could pose a serious threat, as oncoming vehicles may collide with crossing animals. Poaching has been cited as another mortality factor. In one instance, a 3-year-long survey in the Russian Far East in the 1990s detected the illegal shipping of brown bear gallbladders to Southeast Asian countries. The purpose and motive behind the trade is unknown.

An action plan in 2000 aimed to conserve brown bears in Europe by mitigating human–wildlife conflict, educating farm owners as to sustainable practices, and preserving and expanding remaining forests. Compensation was given to people who suffered losses of livestock, food supplies, or shelter. Growing bear populations were recorded in some countries, such as Sweden, where an increase of 1.5% per annum occurred between the 1940s and 1990s. Brown bears in Central Asia are primarily threatened by climate change. In response to this, conservationists plan on building wildlife corridors to promote easy access from one brown bear population to another. In Himalayan Nepal, farmers may kill brown bears in revenge for livestock predation.

== Behavior and life history ==
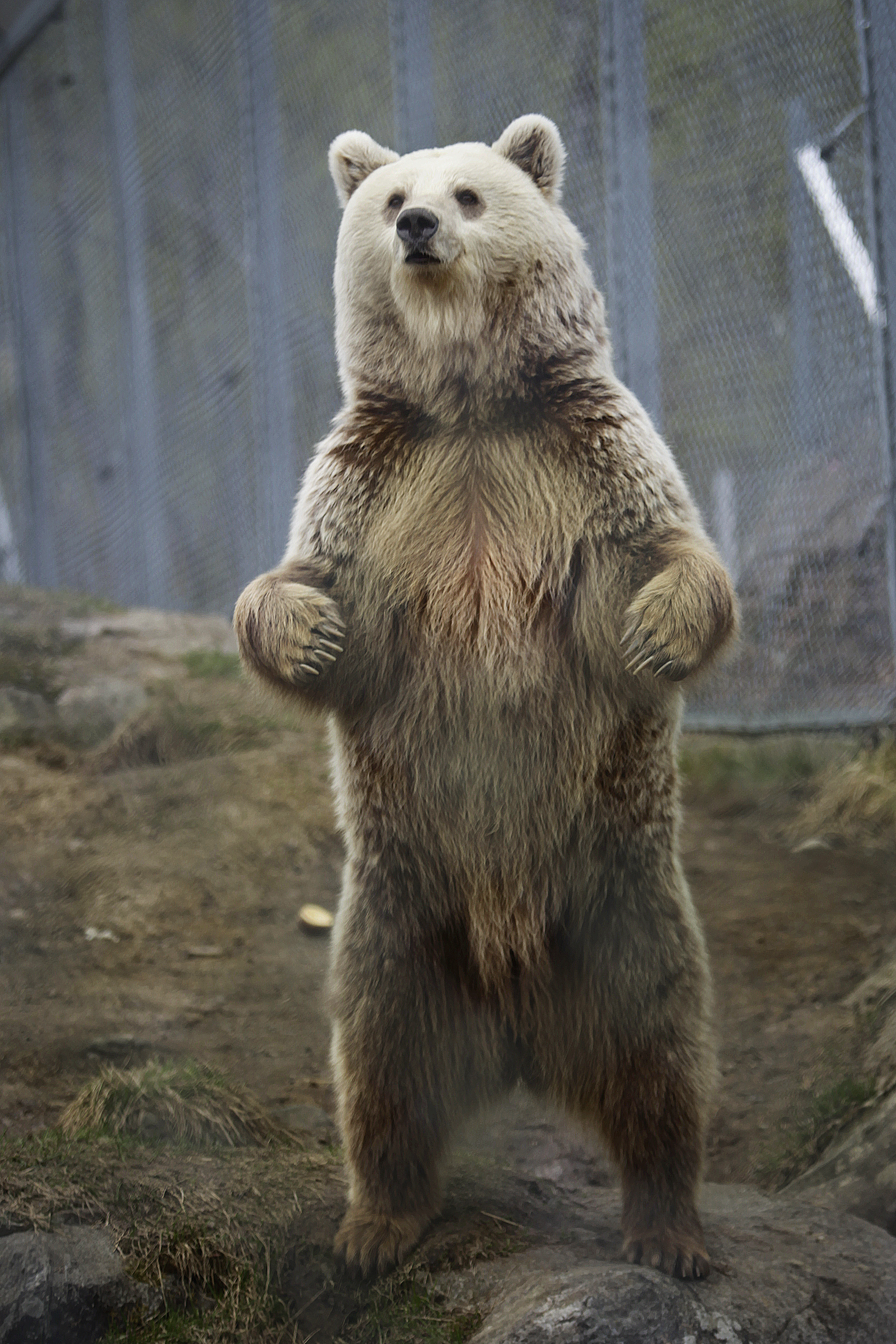
Like all bears, brown bears can stand on their hindlegs and walk for a few steps in this position, usually motivated to do so by curiosity, hunger or alarm

A 2014 study revealed that brown bears peaked in activity around the morning and early evening hours. Although activity can happen day or night, bears that live in locations where they are apt to interact with humans are more likely to be fully nocturnal. In areas with little interaction, many adult bears are primarily crepuscular, while yearlings and newly independent bears appear to be most active throughout the day. From summer through autumn, a brown bear can double its weight from what it was in the spring, gaining up to 180 kg (400 lb) of fat, on which it relies to make it through winter, when it becomes lethargic. Although they are not full hibernators and can be woken easily, both sexes prefer to den in a protected spot during the winter months. Hibernation dens may be located at any spot that provides cover from the elements and that can accommodate their bodies, such as a cave, crevice, cavernous tree roots, or hollow logs.

Brown bears have one of the largest brains of any extant carnivoran relative to their body size. One bear was observed using a barnacle-covered stone to scratch itself, an example of tool use. However, this example remains an isolated incident and more studies are needed to determine how frequent such behavior is. This species is mostly solitary, although bears may gather in large numbers at major food sources (e.g., open garbage dumps or rivers containing spawning salmon) and form social hierarchies based on age and size. Adult male bears are particularly aggressive and are avoided by adolescent and subadult males, both at concentrated feeding opportunities and chance encounters. Females with cubs rival adult males in aggression and are much more intolerant of other bears than single females. Young adolescent males tend to be least aggressive and have been observed in nonantagonistic interactions with each other. Dominance between bears is asserted by making a frontal orientation, showing off canine teeth, muzzle twisting, and neck stretching, to which a subordinate will respond with a lateral orientation, by turning away and dropping the head, and by sitting or lying down. During combat, bears use their paws to strike their opponents in the chest or shoulders and bite the head or neck.

=== Communication ===
Brown bear sounds
Brown bear sounds including huffing, jaw popping and growling

Brown bear roars
Brown bears roaring over a carcass

Several different facial expressions have been documented in brown bears. The "relaxed-face" is made during everyday activities, a face where the ears pointed to the sides and the mouth closed or slackly open. During social play, bears make "relaxed open-mouth face" in which the mouth is open, with a curled upper lip and hanging lower lip, and the ears alert and shifting. When looking at another animal at a distance, the bear makes an "alert face" as the ears are cocked and alert, the eyes wide open with the mouth is closed or only open slightly. The "tense closed mouth face" is made with the ears laid back and the mouth closed, and occurs when the bear feels threatened. When approached by another individual, the animal makes a "puckered-lip face" with a protruding upper lip and ears that go from cocked and alert when at a certain distance to laid back when closer or when retreating. The "jaw gape face" consists of an open mouth with visible lower canines and hanging lips while the "biting face" is similar to the "relaxed open-mouth face" except the ears are flattened and the eyes are wide enough to expose the sclera. Both the "jaw gape face" and the "biting face" are made when the bear is aggressive and can quickly switch between them.

Brown bears also produce various vocalizations. Huffing occurs when the animal is tense, while woofing is made when alarmed. Both sounds are produced by exhalations, though huffing is harsher and is made continuously (approximately twice per second). Growls and roars are made when aggressive. Growling is "harsh" and "guttural" and can range from a simple grrr to a rumble. A rumbling growl can escalate to a roar when the bear is charging. Roaring is described as "thunderous" and can travel 2 km (1.2 mi). Mothers and cubs wanting physical contact will bawl, which is heard as waugh!, waugh!.

=== Home ranges ===
Brown bears usually inhabit vast home ranges; however, they are not highly territorial. Several adult bears roam freely over the same vicinity without contention, unless rights to a fertile female or food sources are being contested. Despite their lack of traditional territorial behavior, adult males seem to have a "personal zone" within which other bears are not tolerated if they are seen. Males always wander further than females, due to such behavior giving increasing access to both females and food sources. Females have the advantage of inhabiting smaller territories, which decreases the likelihood of encounters with male bears who may endanger their cubs.

In areas where food is abundant, such as coastal Alaska, home ranges for females and males are up to 24 km^{2} (9.3 sq mi) and 89 km^{2} (34 sq mi), respectively. Similarly, in British Columbia, bears of the two sexes travel in relatively compact home ranges of 115 and 318 km^{2} (44 and 123 sq mi). In Yellowstone National Park, home ranges for females are up to 281 km^{2} (108 sq mi) and up to 874 km^{2} (337 sq mi) for males. In Romania, the largest home range was recorded for adult males (3,143 km^{2}; 1,214 sq mi). In the central Arctic of Canada, where food sources are quite scarce, home ranges range up to 2,434 km^{2} (940 sq mi) for females and 8,171 km^{2} (3,155 sq mi) for males.

=== Reproduction ===
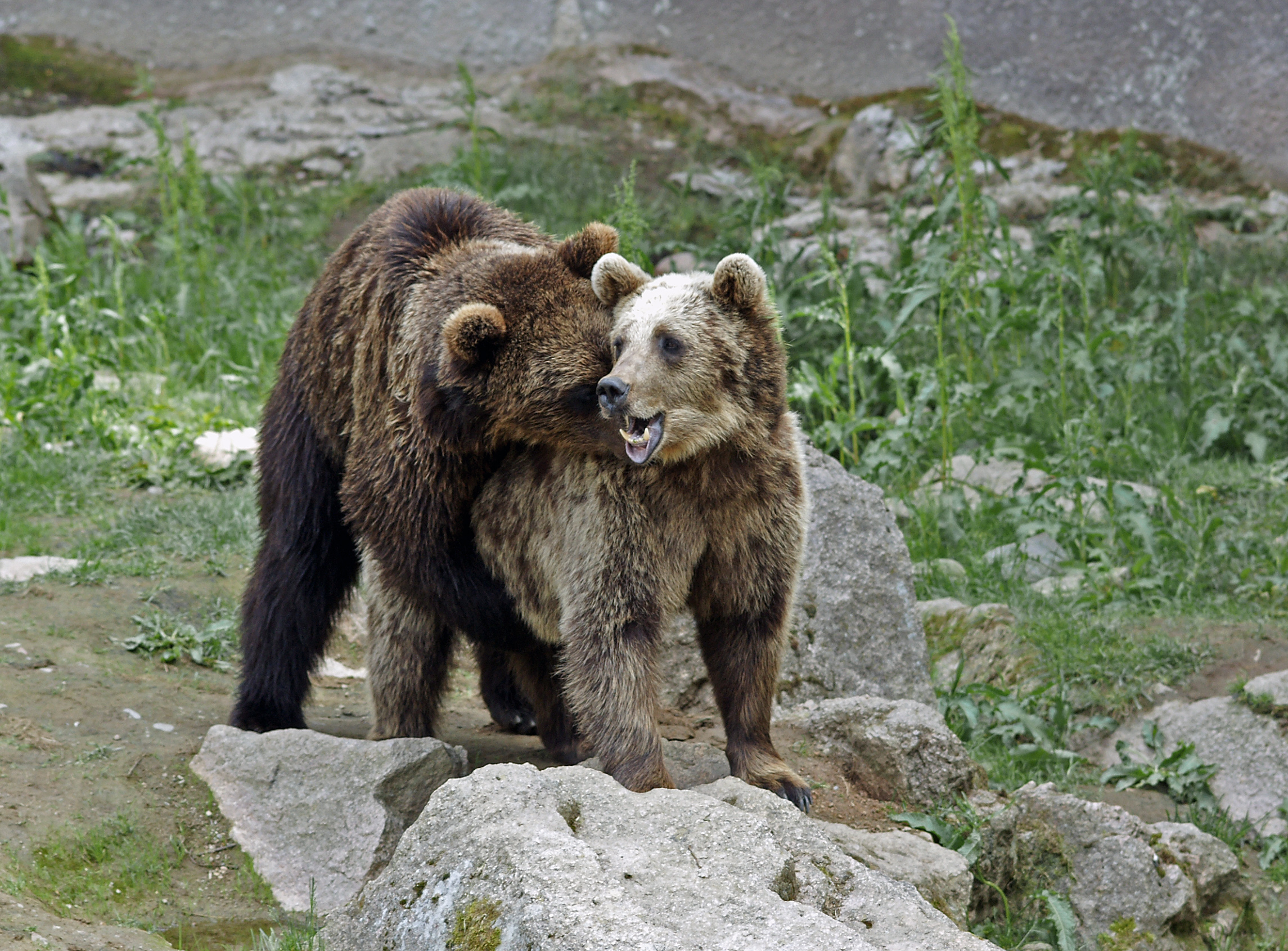
Pair of mating brown bears at the Ähtäri Zoo in Ähtäri, Finland

The mating season occurs from mid-May to early July, shifting to later in the year the farther north the bears are found. Brown bears are polygynandrous, remaining with the same mate for a couple of days to a couple of weeks and mating multiply during the mating season. Outside of this narrow time frame, adult male and female brown bears show no sexual interest in each other. Females mature sexually between the ages of four and eight. Males first mate about a year later, when they are large and strong enough to compete with other males for mating rights. Males will try to mate with as many females as they can; usually a successful male will mate with two females in a span of one to three weeks. Similarly, adult female brown bears can mate with up to four, sometimes even eight, males while in oestrus (heat), potentially mating with two in a single day. Females come into oestrus every three to four years, with an outside range of 2.4 to 5.7 years. The urine markings of a female in oestrus can attract several males via scent. Dominant males may try to sequester a female for her entire oestrus period of approximately two weeks, but usually are unable to retain her for the entire time. Copulation is prolonged and lasts for over 20 minutes.

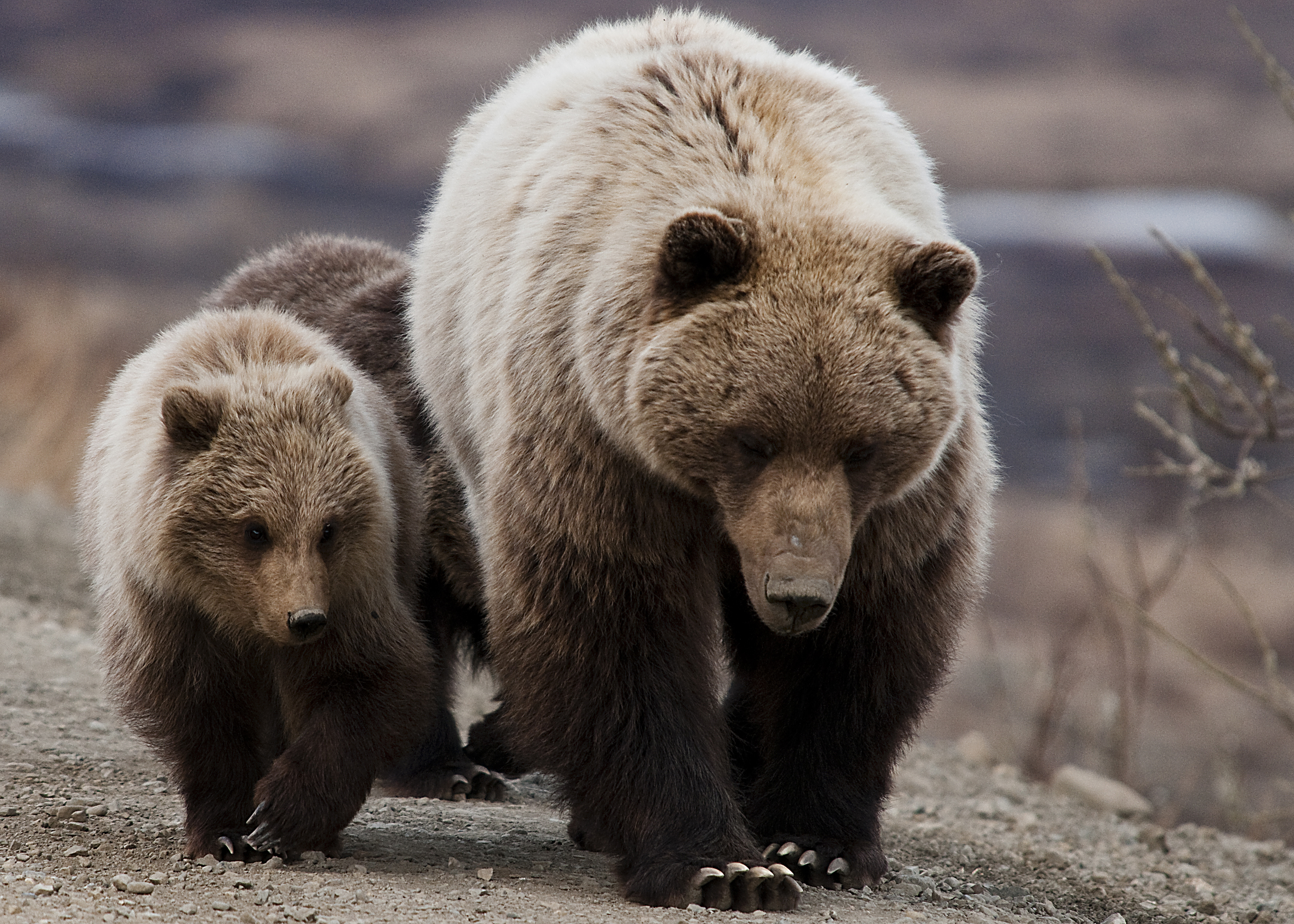
Grizzly bear cubs often imitate their mothers closely.

Males take no part in raising cubs – parenting is left entirely to the females. Through the process of delayed implantation, a female's fertilized egg divides and floats freely in the uterus for six months. During winter dormancy, the fetus attaches to the uterine wall. The cubs are born eight weeks later, while the mother sleeps. If the mother does not gain enough weight to survive through the winter while gestating, the embryo does not implant and is reabsorbed into the body. Litters consist of as many as six cubs, though litters of one to three are more typical. The size of a litter depends on factors such as geographic location and food supply. At birth, cubs are blind, toothless and hairless and may weigh 350 to 510 g (0.77 to 1.12 lb). There are records of females sometimes adopting stray cubs or even trading or kidnapping cubs when they emerge from hibernation (a larger female may claim cubs from a smaller one). Older and larger females within a population tend to give birth to larger litters. The cubs feed on their mother's milk until spring or early summer, depending on climate conditions. At this time, the cubs weigh 7 to 9 kg (15 to 20 lb) and have developed enough to follow and forage for solid food with their mother over long distances.

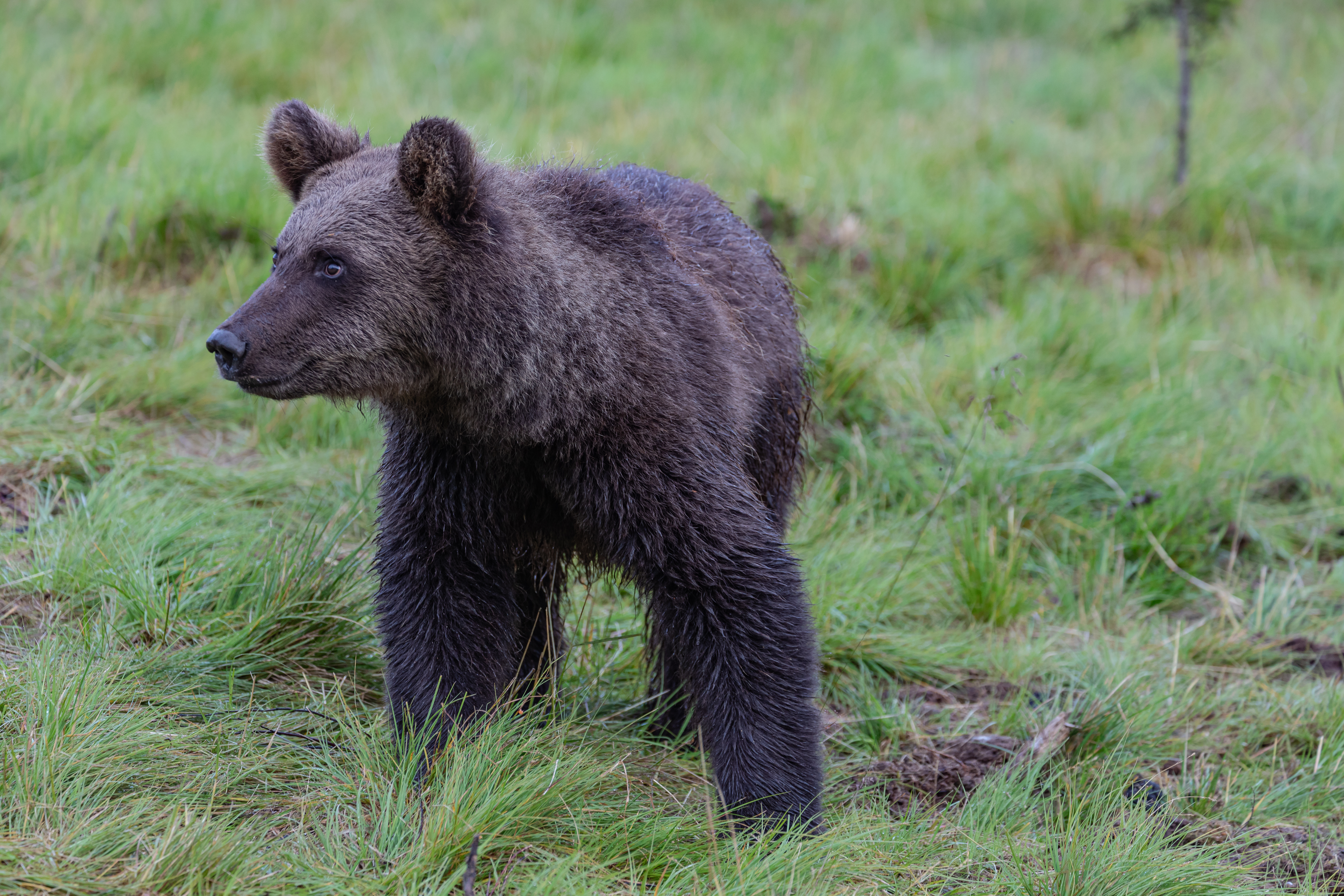
Brown bear cub in Finland

The cubs are dependent on the mother and a close bond is formed. During the dependency stage, the cubs learn (rather than inherit as instincts from birth) survival techniques, such as which foods have the highest nutritional value and where to obtain them; how to hunt, fish, and defend themselves; and where to den. Increased brain size in large carnivores has been positively linked to whether a given species is solitary, as is the brown bear, or raises offspring communally. Thus, the relatively large, well-developed brain of a female brown bear is presumably key in teaching behavior. The cubs learn by following and imitating their mother's actions during the period they are with her. Cubs remain with their mother for an average of 2.5 years in North America, and gain independence from as early as 1.5 years of age to as late as 4.5 years. The stage at which independence is attained may generally be earlier in some parts of Eurasia, as the latest date which mother and cubs were together was 2.3 years. Most families separated in under two years in a study in Hokkaido, and in Sweden most yearlings were their own. Brown bears practice infanticide, as an adult male bear may kill the cubs of another. When an adult male brown bear kills a cub, it is usually because he is trying to bring the female into oestrus, as she will enter that state within two to four days after the death of her cubs. Cubs may flee up a tree when they see a strange male bear approaching. The mother often successfully defends them, even though the male may be twice as heavy as she. However, females have been known to die in such confrontations.

=== Dietary habits ===
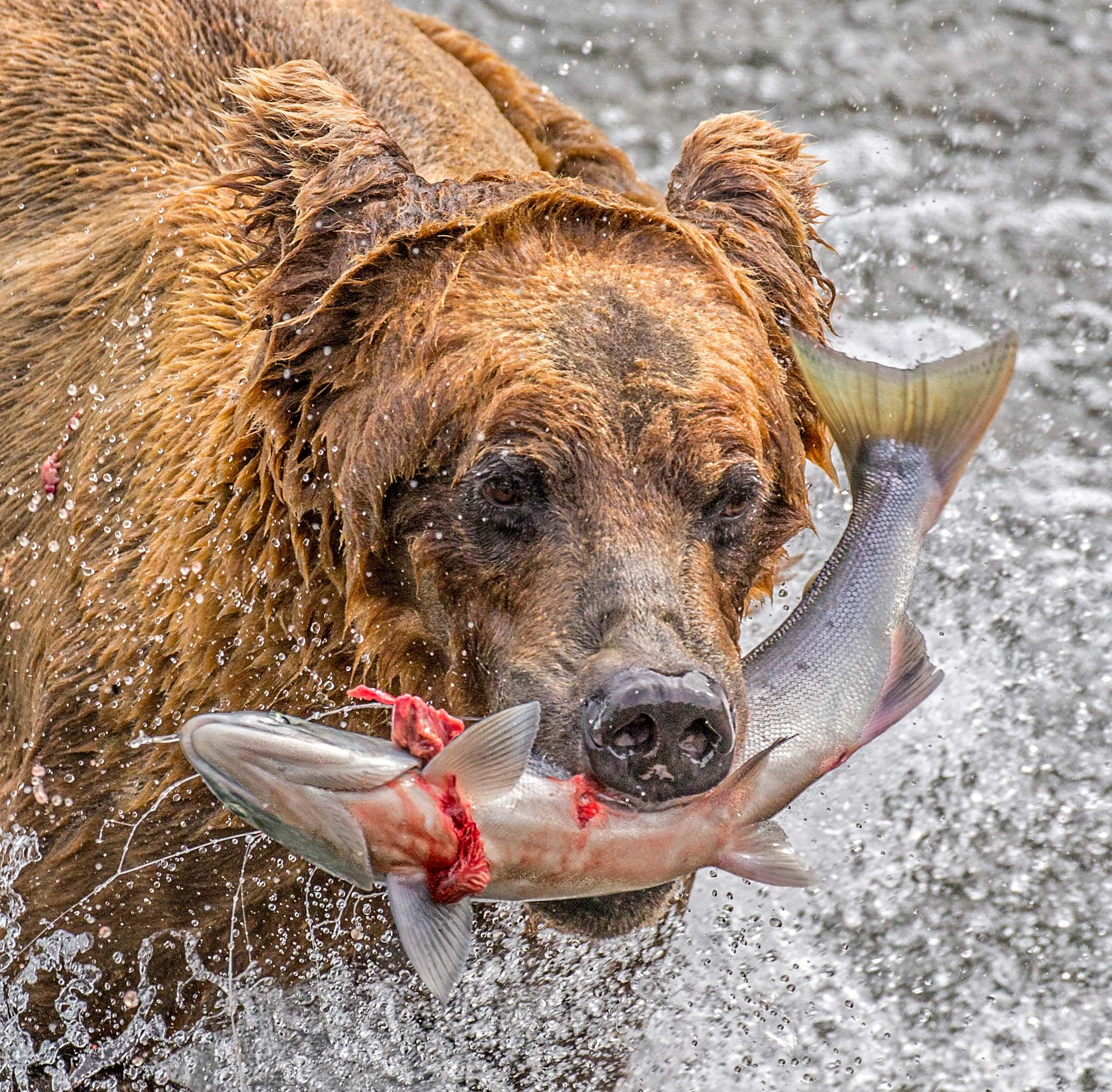
Brown bear hunting salmon

The brown bear is one of the most omnivorous animals and has been recorded as consuming the greatest variety of foods of any bear. Despite their reputation, most brown bears are not highly carnivorous, as they derive up to 90% of their dietary food energy from vegetable matter. They often feed on a variety of plant life, including berries, grasses, flowers, acorns, and pine cones, as well as fungi such as mushrooms. Among all bears, brown bears are uniquely equipped to dig for tough foods such as roots, bulbs, and shoots. They use their long, strong claws to dig out earth to reach roots and their powerful jaws to bite through them. In spring, winter-provided carrion, grasses, shoots, sedges, moss, and forbs are the dietary mainstays for brown bears internationally. Fruits, including berries, become increasingly important during summer and early autumn. Roots and bulbs become critical in autumn for some inland bear populations if fruit crops are poor.

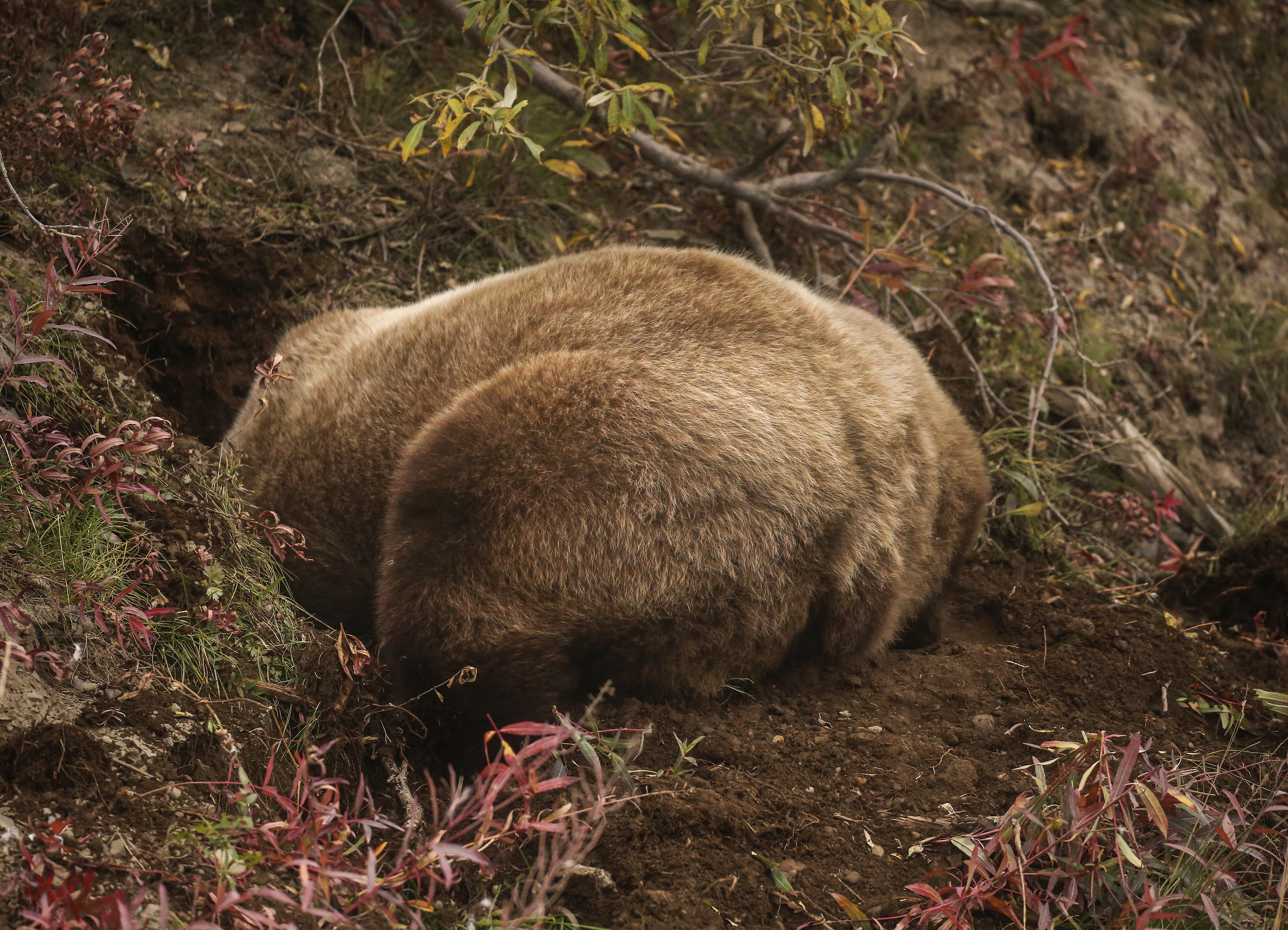
Brown bear digging for squirrels

They will also commonly consume animal matter, which in summer and autumn may regularly be in the form of insects, larvae, and grubs, including beehives. Bears in Yellowstone eat an enormous number of moths during the summer, sometimes as many as 40,000 army cutworm moths in a single day, and may derive up to half of their annual food energy from these insects. Brown bears living near coastal regions will regularly eat crabs and clams. In Alaska, bears along the beaches of estuaries regularly dig through the sand for clams. This species may eat birds and their eggs, including almost entirely ground- or rock-nesting species. The diet may be supplemented by rodents or similar small mammals, including marmots, ground squirrels, mice, rats, lemmings, and voles. With particular regularity, bears in Denali National Park will wait at burrows of Arctic ground squirrels, hoping to pick off a few of the 1 kg (2.2 lb) rodents.

In the Kamchatka peninsula and several parts of coastal Alaska, brown bears feed mostly on spawning salmon, whose nutrition and abundance explain the enormous size of the bears in those areas. The fishing techniques of bears are well-documented. They often congregate around falls when the salmon are forced to breach the water, at which point the bears will try to catch the fish in mid-air (often with their mouths). They will also wade into shallow water, hoping to pin a slippery salmon with their claws. While they may eat almost all the parts of the fish, bears at the peak of salmon spawning, when there is usually a glut of fish to feed on, may eat only the most nutrious parts of the salmon (including the eggs and head) and then indifferently leave the rest of the carcass to scavengers, which can include red foxes, bald eagles, common ravens, and gulls. Despite their normally solitary habits, brown bears will gather closely in numbers at good spawning sites. The largest and most powerful males claim the most fruitful fishing spots and will sometimes fight over the rights to them.

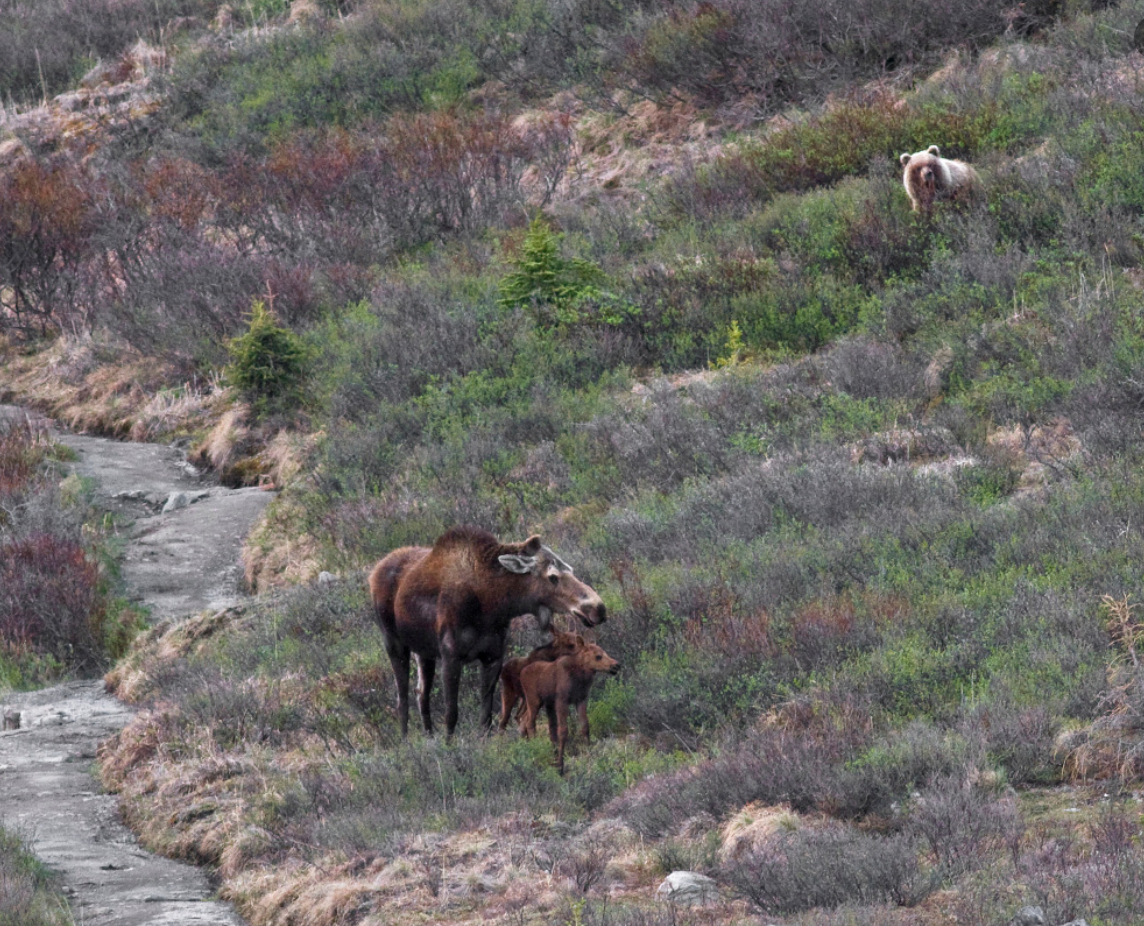
A cow moose with calves being approached by an inland brown bear, Denali National Park, Alaska

Beyond the regular predation of salmon, most brown bears are not particularly active predators. While perhaps a majority of bears of the species will charge at large prey at one point in their lives, many predation attempts start with the bear clumsily and half-heartedly pursuing the prey and end with the prey escaping alive. On the other hand, some brown bears are quite self-assured predators who habitually pursue and catch large prey. Such bears are usually taught how to hunt by their mothers from an early age. Large mammals preyed on include hooved mammals like elk, moose, caribou, muskoxen, and wild boar. When brown bears attack these large animals, they usually target young or infirm ones, which are easier to catch. Typically when hunting (especially young prey), the bear pins its prey to the ground and then immediately tears at and eats it alive. It will also bite or swipe some prey to stun it enough to knock it over for consumption. In general, large mammalian prey is killed with raw strength and bears do not display the specialized killing methods of felids and canids. To pick out young or infirm individuals, bears will charge at herds so the more vulnerable, and thus slower-moving, individuals will become apparent. Brown bears may ambush young animals by finding them via scent.

When emerging from hibernation, brown bears, whose broad paws allow them to walk over most ice and snow, may pursue large prey such as moose, whose hooves cannot support them on encrusted snow. Similarly, predatory attacks on large prey sometimes occur at riverbeds, when it is more difficult for the prey specimen to run away due to muddy or slippery soil. On rare occasions, while confronting fully-grown, dangerous prey, bears kill them by hitting with their powerful forearms, which can break the necks and backs of large creatures such as adult moose and adult bison. They feed on carrion, and use their size to intimidate other predators – such as wolves, cougars, tigers, and American black bears – away from their kills. Carrion is especially important in the early spring (when the bears are emerging from hibernation), much of it comprising winter-killed big game. Cannibalism is not unheard of, though predation is not normally believed to be the primary motivation when brown bears attack each other.

When forced to live in close proximity with humans and their domesticated animals, bears may potentially predate any type of domestic animal. Among these, domestic cattle are sometimes exploited as prey. Cattle are bitten on the neck, back, or head, and then the abdominal cavity is opened for eating. Plants and fruit farmed by humans are readily consumed as well, including corn, wheat, sorghum, melons, and any form of berries. They may feed on domestic bee yards, readily consuming both honey and the brood (grubs and pupae) of the honey bee colony. Human foods and trash are eaten when possible. When an open garbage dump was kept in Yellowstone, brown bears were one of the most voracious and regular scavengers. The dump was closed after both brown and American black bears came to associate humans with food and lost their natural fear of them.

=== Relations with other predators ===
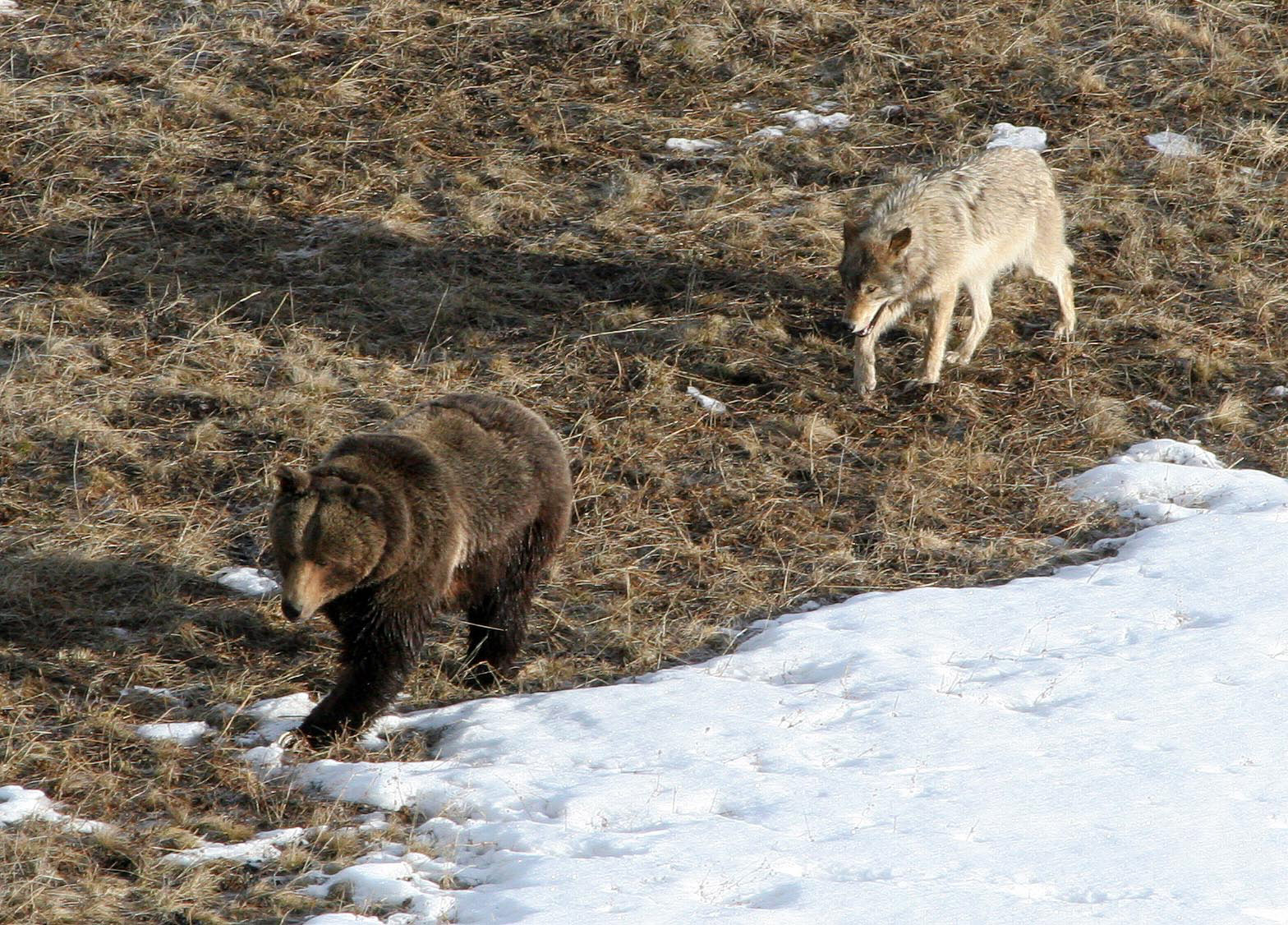
Brown bear being followed by a wolf

Adult bears are generally immune to predatory attacks except from large Siberian (Amur) tigers and other bears. Following a decrease of ungulate populations from 1944 to 1959, 32 cases of Siberian tigers attacking both Ussuri brown bears (Ursus arctos lasiotus) and Ussuri black bears (U. thibetanus ussuricus) were recorded in the Russian Far East, and bear hairs were found in several tiger scat samples. Tigers attack black bears less often than brown bears, since the brown bears live in more open habitats and are not able to climb trees. In the same time period, four cases of brown bears killing female tigers and young cubs were reported, both in disputes over prey and in self-defense. In rare cases, when Amur tigers prey on brown bears, they usually target young and sub-adult bears, besides small female adults taken outside their dens, generally when lethargic from hibernation. Predation by tigers on denned brown bears was not detected during a study carried out between 1993 and 2002. Ussuri brown bears, along with the smaller black bears constitute 2.1% of the Siberian tiger's annual diet, of which 1.4% are brown bears.

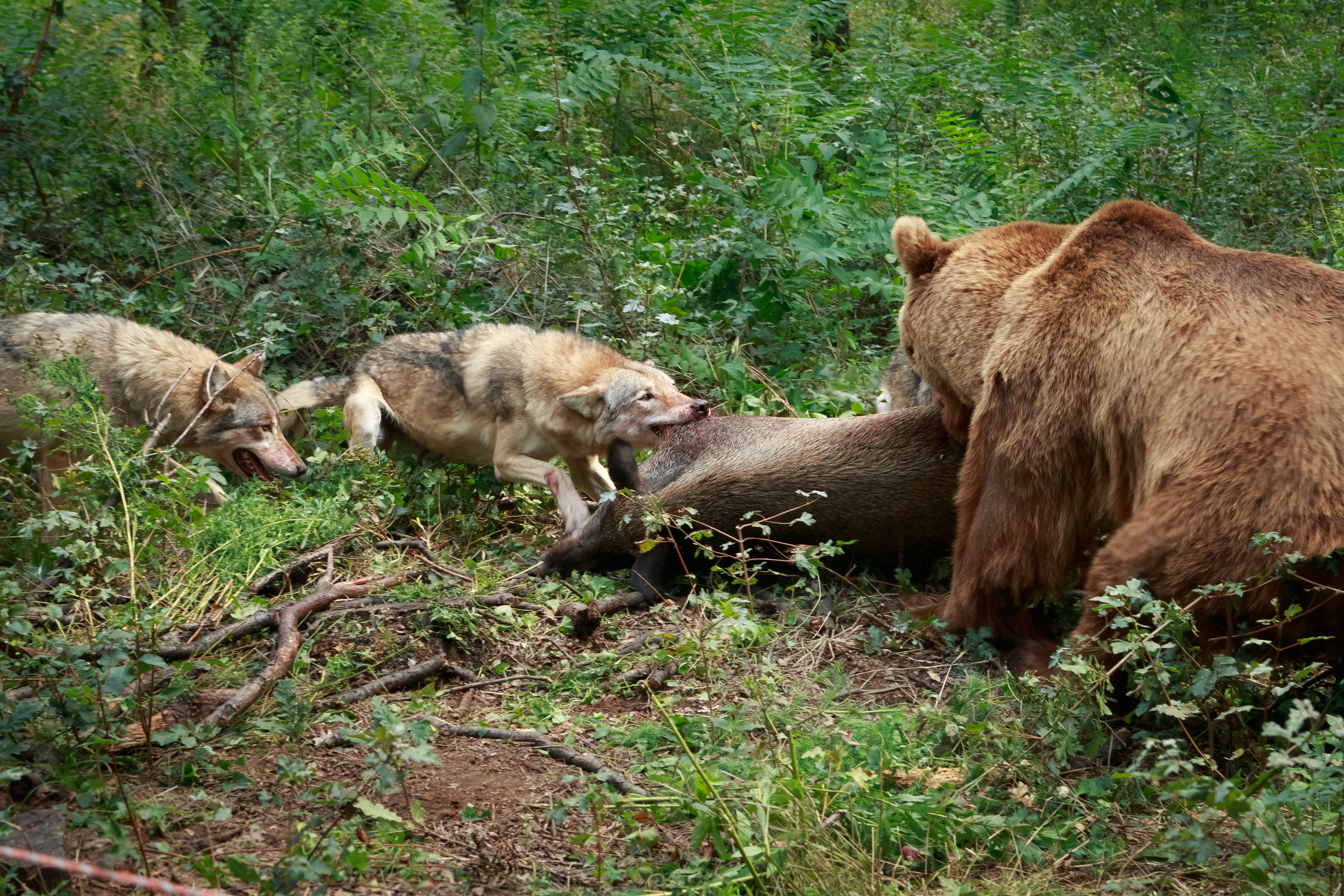
Brown bear and wolf pack squabbling over a carcass

Brown bears regularly intimidate wolves to drive them away from their kills. In Yellowstone National Park, bears pirate wolf kills so often, Yellowstone's Wolf Project director Doug Smith wrote, "It's not a matter of if the bears will come calling after a kill, but when." Despite the animosity between the two species, most confrontations at kill sites or large carcasses end without bloodshed on either side. Though conflict over carcasses is common, on rare occasions the two predators tolerate each other at the same kill. To date, there is a single recorded case of fully-grown wolves being killed by a grizzly bear. Given the opportunity, however, both species will prey on the other's cubs. In some areas, grizzly bears regularly displace cougars from their kills. Cougars kill small bear cubs on rare occasions, but there was only one report of a bear killing a cougar, of unknown age and condition, between 1993 and 1996.

Brown bears usually dominate other bear species in areas where they coexist. Due to their smaller size, American black bears are at a competitive disadvantage to grizzly bears in open, unforested areas. Although displacement of black bears by grizzly bears has been documented, actual killing of black bears by grizzlies has only occasionally been reported. Confrontation is mostly avoided due to the black bear's diurnal habits and preference for heavily forested areas, as opposed to the grizzly's largely nocturnal habits and preference for open spaces. Brown bears may also kill Asian black bears, though the latter species probably largely avoids conflicts with the brown bear, due to similar habits and habitat preferences to the American black species. As of the 21st century, there has been an increase in interactions between brown bears and polar bears, theorized to be caused by climate change. Brown and grizzly bears have been seen moving increasingly northward into territories formerly claimed by polar bears. They tend to dominate polar bears in disputes over carcasses, and dead polar bear cubs have been found in brown bear dens.

=== Longevity and mortality ===
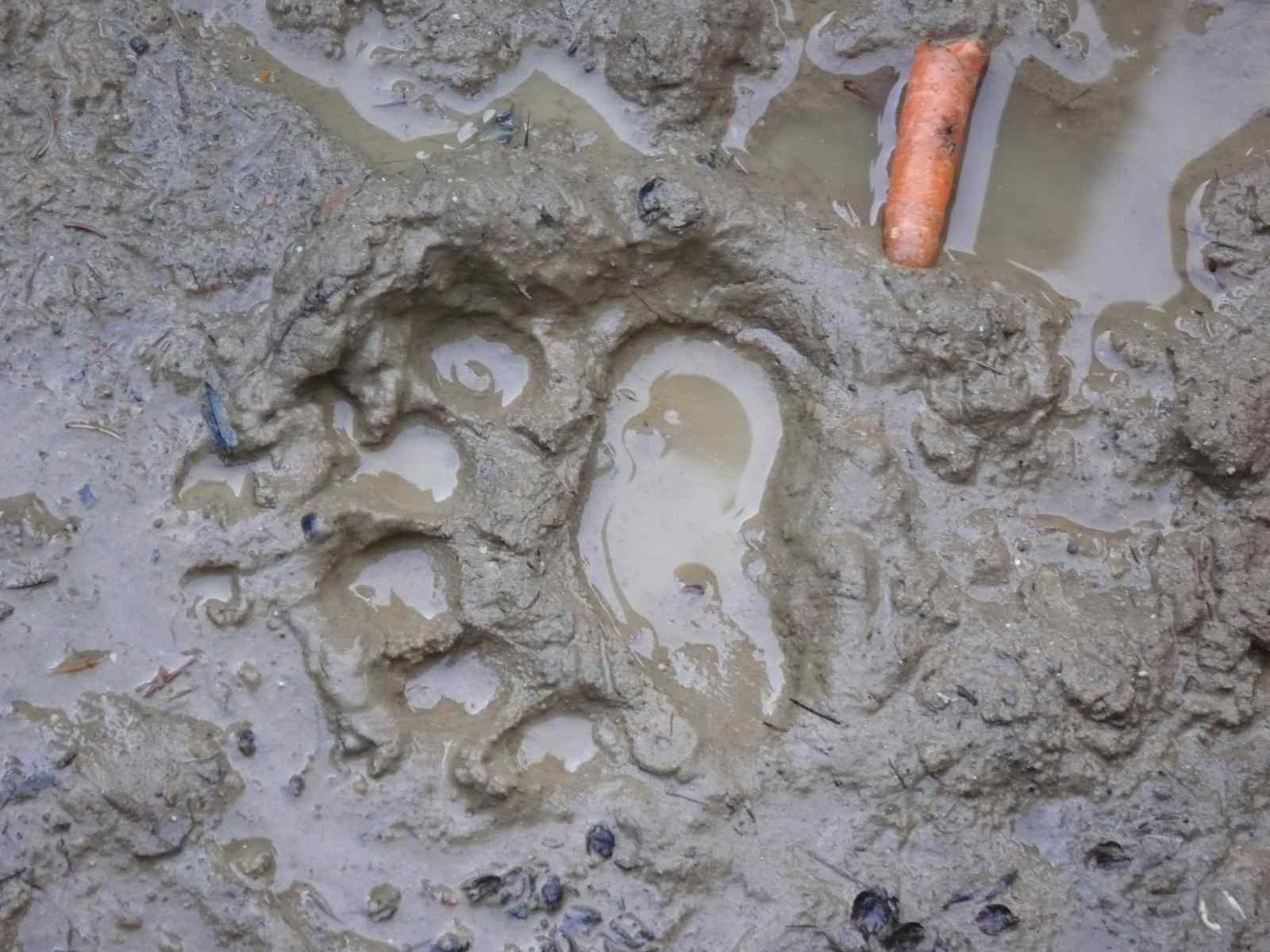
Front paw imprint

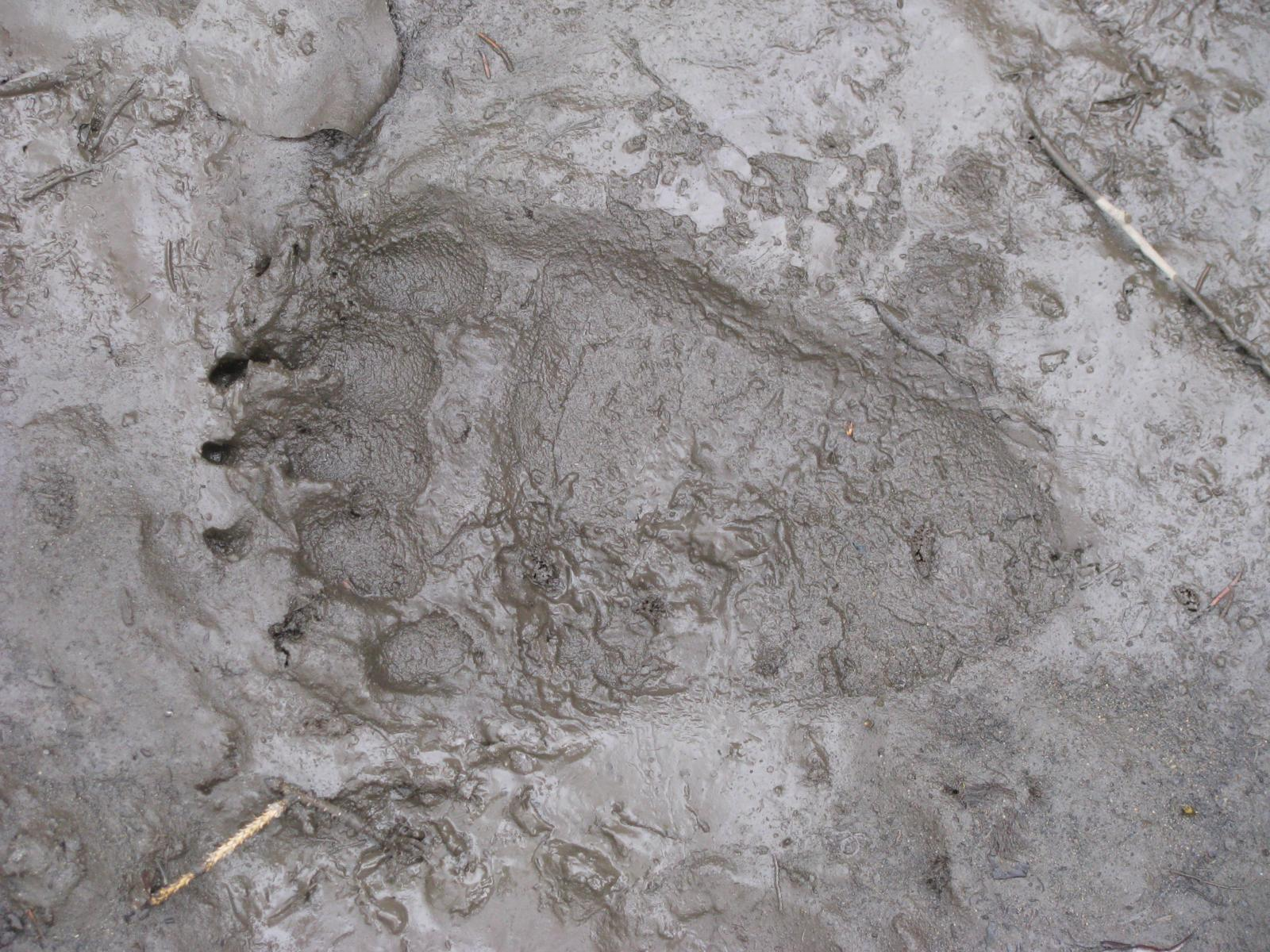
Rear paw imprint

The brown bear has a naturally long life. Wild females have been observed reproducing at 28 years, which is the oldest known age for reproduction of any ursid in the wild. The peak reproductive age for females ranges from four to 20 years old. The lifespan of both sexes within minimally hunted populations is estimated at an average of 20 to 30 years. The oldest recorded wild individual was nearly 37 years old. In captivity, the oldest recorded female was around 40 years old, while males have been known to live up to 47 years. The longest-lived brown bear on record was Andreas, a male who lived at the Arcturos bear sanctuary in northern Greece. He was at least 50 years old when he died in 2013.

While male bears potentially live longer in captivity, female grizzly bears have a greater annual survival rate than males within wild populations, per a study done in the Greater Yellowstone Ecosystem. Annual mortality for bears of any age is estimated at 10% in most protected areas. Around 13% to 44% of cubs die within their first year. Beyond predation by large predators – including wolves, Siberian tigers, and other brown bears – starvation and accidents also claim the lives of cubs. Studies have indicated that the most prevalent cause of mortality for first-year cubs is malnutrition.

Brown bears are susceptible to parasites such as flukes, ticks, tapeworms, roundworms, and biting lice. It is thought that brown bears may catch canine distemper virus (CDV) from other caniforms such as stray dogs and wolves. A captive individual allegedly succumbed to Aujeszky's disease.

=== Hibernation physiology ===
A study conducted by the Brown Bear Research Project did a proteomic analysis of the brown bear's blood, organs, and tissues to pinpoint proteins and peptides that either increased or decreased in expression in the winter and summer months. One major finding was that the presence of the plasma protein sex hormone-binding globulin (SHBG) increased by 45 times during the brown bear's hibernation period. Although scientists do not yet understand the role of SHBG in maintaining the brown bear's health, some believe these findings could potentially help in understanding and preventing human diseases that come from a sedentary lifestyle.

== Relations with humans ==
=== Attacks on humans ===
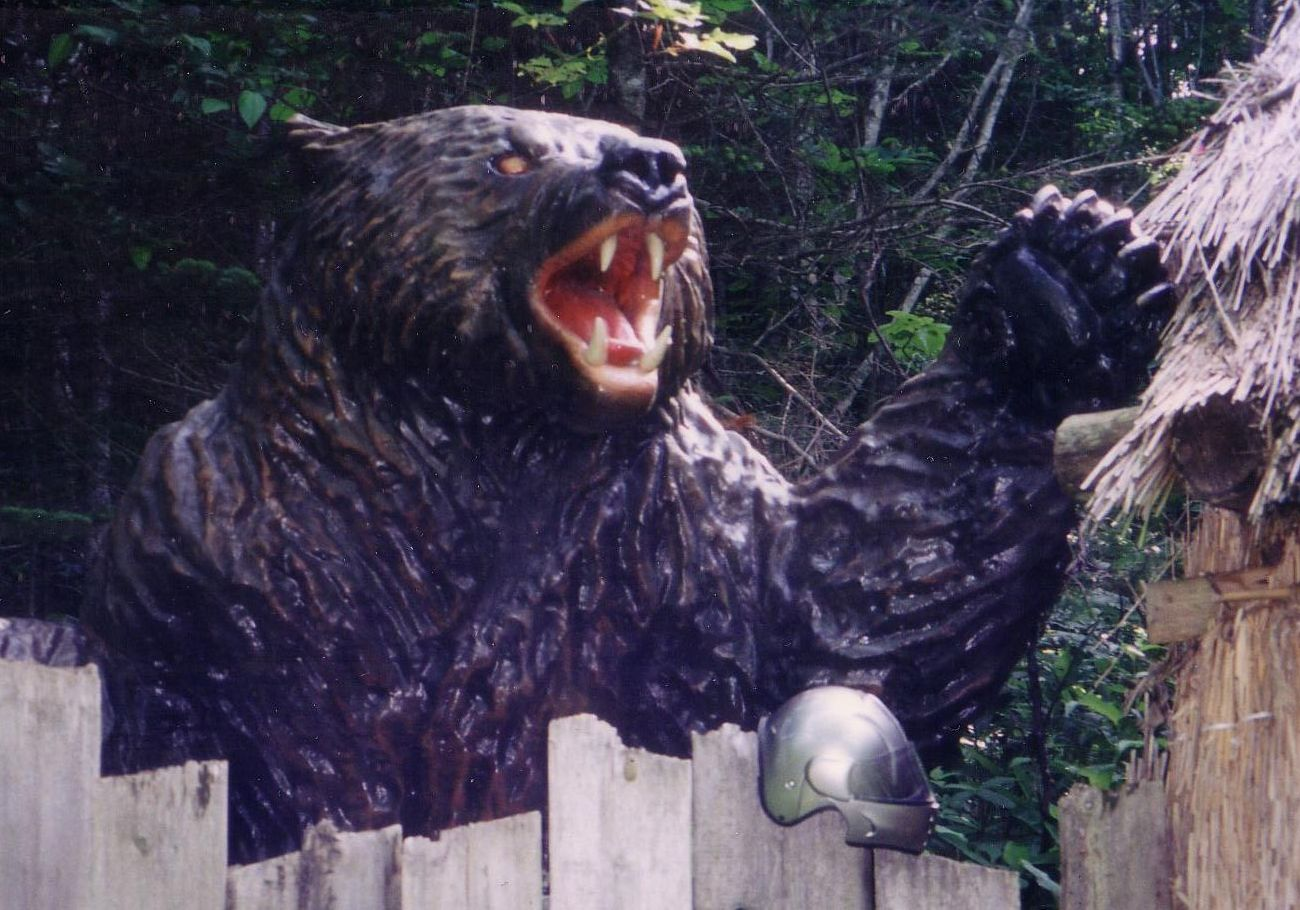
A statue of the Ussuri brown bear from Hokkaido, Japan

Brown bears usually avoid areas where extensive development or urbanization has occurred. They usually avoid people and rarely attack on sight. They are, however, unpredictable in temperament, and may attack if threatened or surprised. Mothers defending cubs are the most prone to attacking, being responsible for 70% of brown bear-caused human fatalities in North America. Attacks tend to result in serious injury and, in some cases, death. Due to the bears' enormous physical strength, a single bite or swipe can be deadly. Violent encounters with brown bears usually last a few minutes, though they can be prolonged if the victims fight back.

A study conducted in 2019 found that 664 bear attacks were reported during a 15-year period (2000–2015) throughout North America and Eurasia. There were 568 injuries and 95 fatalities. Around 10 people a year are killed by brown bears in Russia, more than all the other parts of the brown bear's range combined. In Japan, a large brown bear nicknamed Kesagake ("kesa-style slasher") caused the worst brown bear attack in Japanese history in Tomamae, Hokkaido, during numerous encounters during December 1915. It killed seven people and wounded three others before being gunned down during a large-scale beast-hunt. A study by U.S. and Canadian researchers has found bear spray to be more effective at stopping aggressive bear behavior than guns, working in 92% of studied incidents, versus 67% for guns.

=== Bear hunting ===
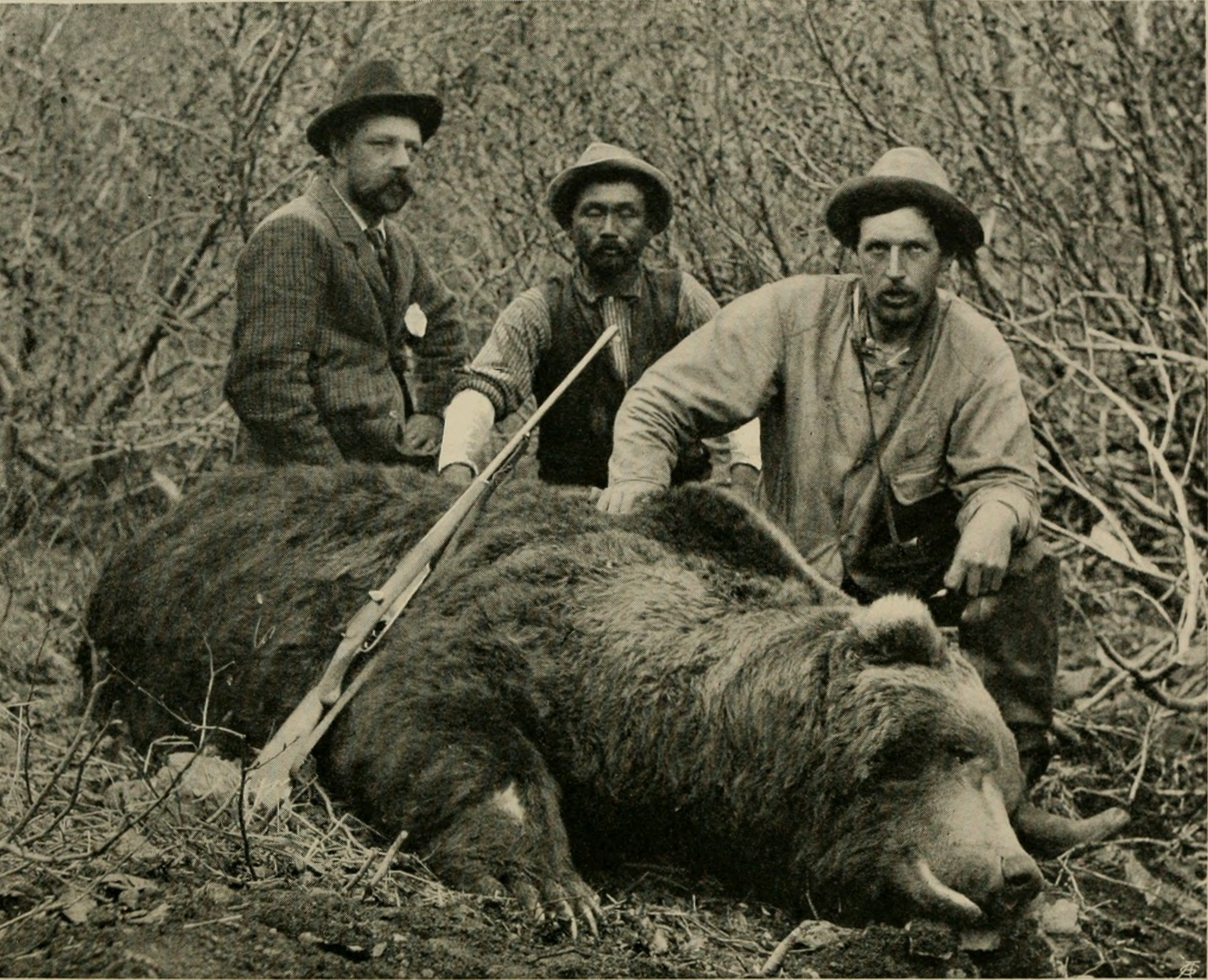
Hunters with a bear killed by a rifle (1904)

Humans have been recorded hunting brown bears for over 10,300–9,300 years. Bears were hunted throughout their range in Europe, Asia and North America by groups such as Native Americans and Europeans. The former usually killed bears for survival needs, while the latter for sports or population control. In Europe, between the 17th and 18th centuries, humans sought to control brown bear numbers by awarding those who managed to kill one. This bounty scheme pushed the brown bear population to the brink of extinction before comprehensive protection was offered in the 1900s. Despite this, a 2018 study found hunting to be one of the contributing factors to the drop in brown bear numbers in northern Europe.

The earliest known case of European killing of grizzly bears dates back to 1691. Their arrival in western United States led to the extirpation of local brown bear populations in the 19th and early 20th centuries. During the early years of European settlement in North America, bears were usually killed with a spear or lasso rope. The introduction of rifles in the mid-19th century largely facilitated bear hunts, which allowed for an increasing trend. Bears were also pitted into fights against male cattle, often ending with either animal grievously injured or dead. The last two decades of the 19th century saw an increase in bounties. Conflicts with farmers also contributed to the species' rapid decline. It was not until the 1920s when grizzly bears received some type of protection from the US government. Today, brown bears are legally hunted in some American states, such as Alaska. However, a hunting license is required and killings of nurturing females and cubs will result in a prison sentence.

Brown bear meat is sometimes consumed and used in recipes such as dumplings, hams and stews. The Indigenous people of James Bay (Eastern) Cree use their flesh in traditional dishes. In Asia and Romania, the paws are consumed as exotic delectables and have been a prevalent component of traditional Chinese food since 500 BC. The total weight of commercially sold brown bear meat is estimated at 17 tons annually.

=== In captivity ===
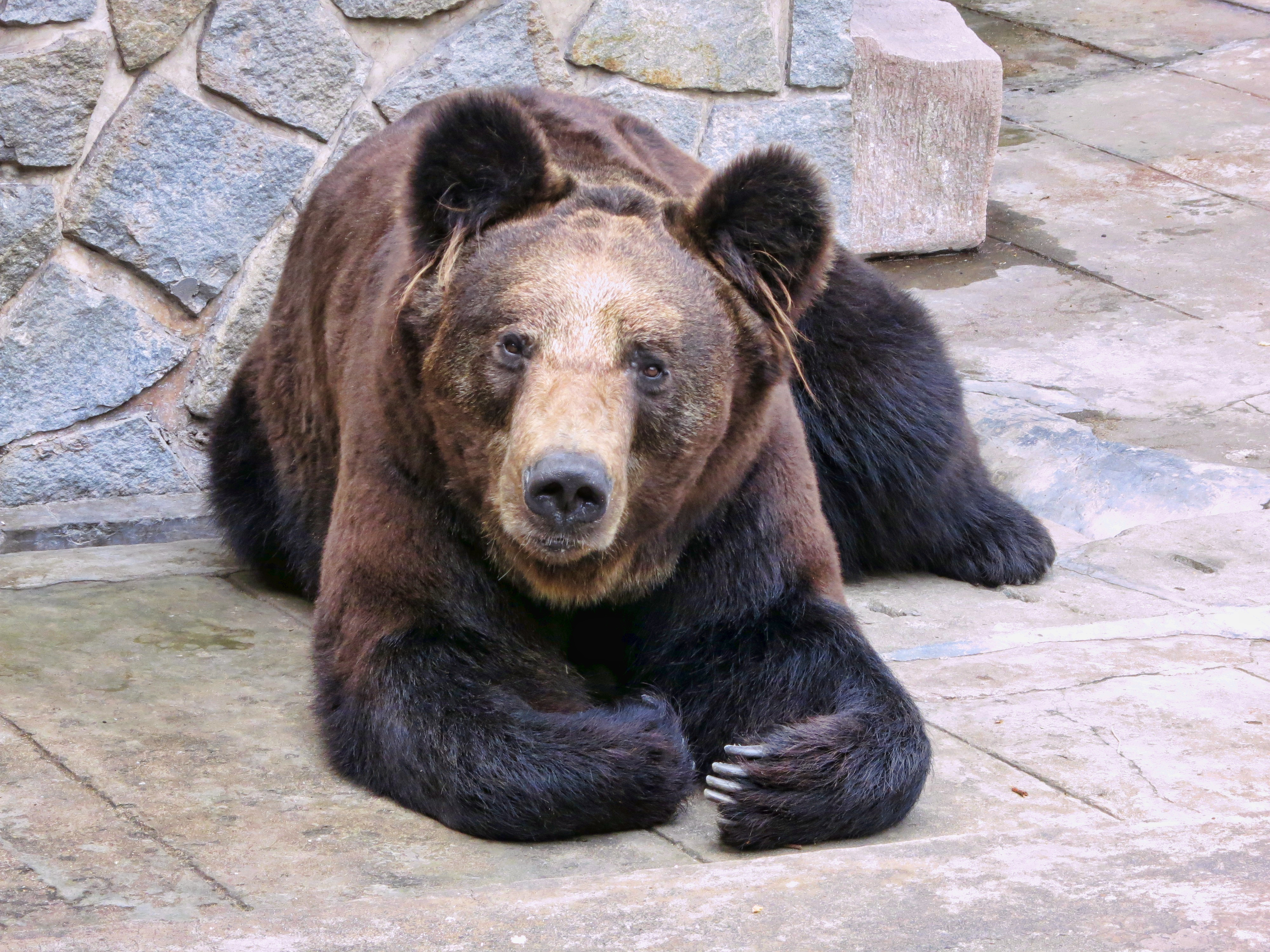
Brown bear at Canton Zoo, US

Bears have been recorded in captivity as early as 1,500 BC. As of 2017, there are more than 700 brown bears in zoos and wildlife parks worldwide. Captive bears are largely lethargic and spend a considerable amount of time doing nothing. When active, captive bears may engage in repetitive back and forth motion, known as pacing. This behavior is most prevalent in bears kept in small, cramped cages often with no natural setting. Pacing is a way of coping with stress that comes with being trapped in unnaturally small spaces. These stereotyped behaviors have decreased due to better and larger enclosures being built, and more sustainable management from zoo staff.

Starting from infancy, brown bears may be exploited as dancing bears. Cubs, for example, are positioned on hot metal plates, causing them to "dance" to the sound of violin music running in the background. The process is repeated, resulting in bears being trained to "dance" when a violin is played. Similarly, brown bears are displayed in tiny enclosures near a restaurant, mainly for the purpose of luring customers. Privately owned bears are also placed in insufficient environments and often suffer from malnutrition and obesity.

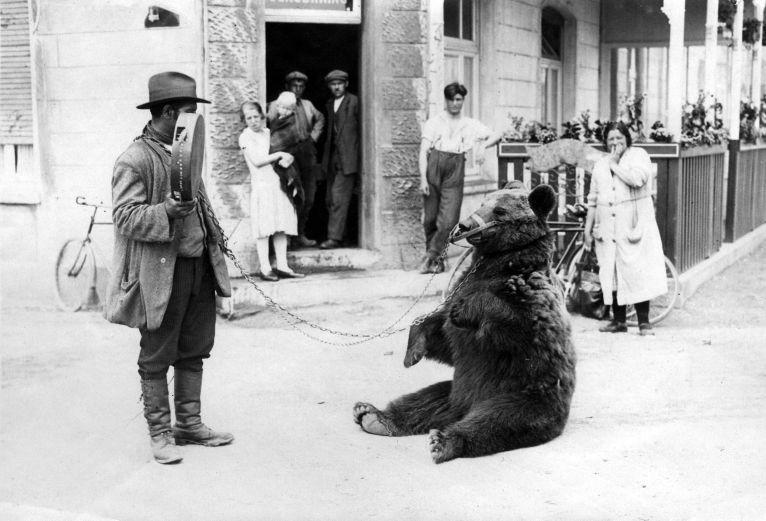
Animal trainer with a bear

Brown bears have been popular attractions at circuses and other acts since ancient times. Due to their large size and imposing demeanor, the Romans used brown bears in the execution of criminals, and pitted bears in fights with other animals. Gladiators would also fight bears, in what was essentially a fight to the death. Such events occurred in amphitheaters housing thousands of spectators. In later times, street performances became popular in the Middle Ages; acts included "dancing" and "sleeping on command". These performances became increasingly widespread, and from the 1700s to 1800s, traveling circuses would perform in the streets of many European and Asian countries. Such circuses made use of bears that wore special clothing, and were usually run by musicians. A short while later, modern circuses began utilizing bears around the second half of the 18th century. Brown bears were said to be the easiest bear species to train due to their intelligence, unique personalities, and exceptional stability. According to a 2009 analysis, the brown bear was the second most exploited circus animal after the tiger.

=== Culture ===
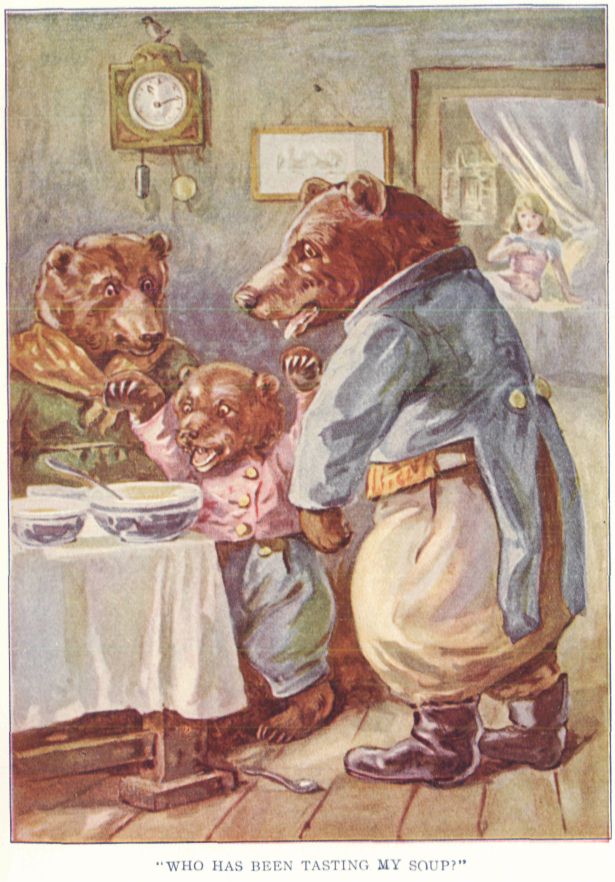
"The Story of the Three Bears", illustration from Childhood's Favorites and Fairy Stories

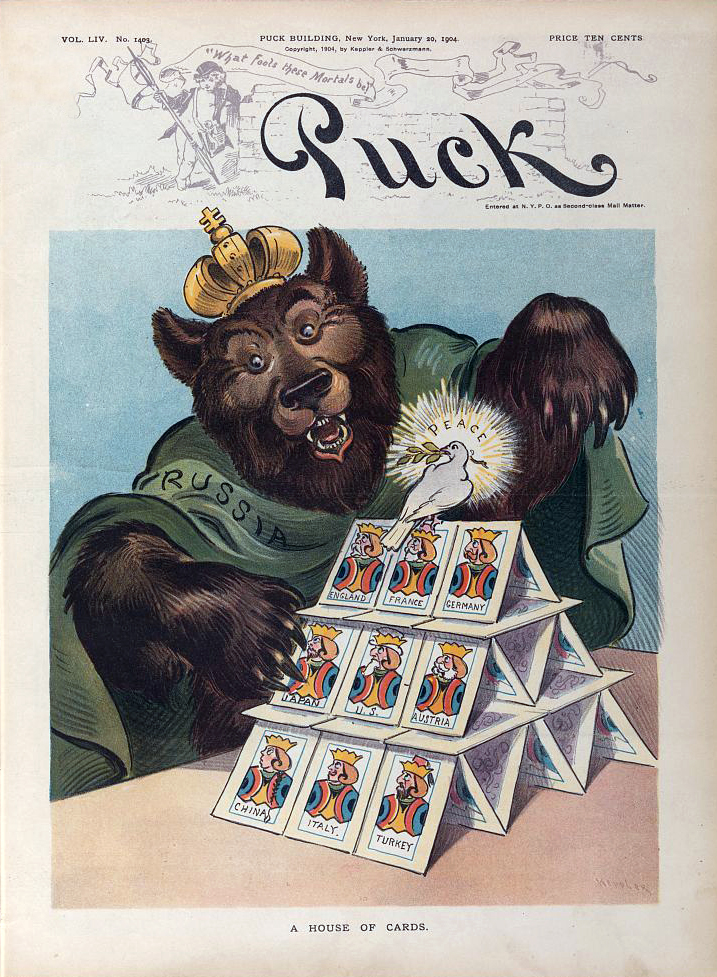
Russia is often represented by a bear, as in this Puck political cartoon from 1904.

Bears have been popular subjects in art, literature, folklore, and mythology. The image of the mother bear was prevalent throughout societies in North America and Eurasia, based on the female's devotion and protection of her cubs. The earliest cave paintings of bears occurred in the Paleolithic, with over 100 recorded paintings. Brown bears often figure in the literature of Europe and North America as "cute and cuddly", in particular that which is written for children. "The Brown Bear of Norway" is a Scottish fairy tale telling of the adventures of a girl who married a prince magically turned into a bear and who managed to get him back into a human form by the force of her love after many trials and tribulations. With "Goldilocks and the Three Bears", a story from England, the Three Bears are usually depicted as brown bears. In German-speaking countries, children are often told the fairytale of "Snow White and Rose Red"; the handsome prince in this tale has been transfigured into a brown bear. In the United States, parents often read their preschool age children the book Brown Bear, Brown Bear, What Do You See? to teach them their colors and how they are associated with different animals. Smokey Bear, the famous mascot of U.S. Forest Service, has since the 1940s been used to educate people on the dangers of human-caused wildfire.

Brown bears have been extensively featured in the culture of Native Americans and are considered sacred. To stop a bear's spirit from escaping after it was killed, the Denaa people severed all four of its paws. They delayed consuming brown-bear flesh, owing to the belief that the bear's spirit was overwhelming in fresh kills. In addition, community members that wore bear claw necklaces were highly respected, as wearing one was seen as a sign of bravery and honor. The clattering caused by repeatedly shaking these necklaces were believed to bring forth therapeutic powers. In Haida culture, one legend has it that a marriage between a woman and a grizzly bear commenced the lineage of the native people. This is thought to have allowed the Haida to thrive in bear country.

There is evidence of prehistoric bear worship, though this is disputed by archaeologists. Nevertheless, Ancient Romans built small carved figures of bears that were used during the burials of infants and it is possible that bear worship existed in early Chinese and Ainu cultures. In Ancient Greek mythology, bears were considered similar to humans, mainly due to their ability to stand upright. In many western stories and older fables the portrayed attributes of bears are sluggishness, foolishness, and gullibility, which contradicts the actual behavior of the species. For example, bears have been reported tricking hunters by backtracking in the snow.

In North America, the brown bear is considered a charismatic megafauna and has long piqued people's interest. The death of Bear 148 at the hands of a trophy hunter in 2017 sparked media outrage and the continued disapproval of trophy hunting. The Russian bear is a common national personification for Russia (as well as the former Soviet Union), despite the country having no officially-designated national animal. The brown bear is Finland's national animal. The grizzly bear is the state animal of Montana. The California golden bear is the state animal of California, despite being extinct. The coat of arms of Madrid depicts a bear reaching up into a madroño or strawberry tree (Arbutus unedo) to eat some of its fruit. The Swiss city of Bern's coat of arms depicts a bear and the city's name is popularly thought to derive from the German word for bear. The brown bear is depicted on the reverse of the Croatian 5-kuna coin, minted since 1993.

== Bibliography ==
- Вайсфельд, М.А.; Честин, И.Е., eds. (1993). Медведи: бурый медведь, белый медведь, гималайский медведь : размещение запасов, экология, использование и охрана [Bears: Brown Bear, Polar Bear, Asian Black Bear. Distribution, ecology, use and protection] (PDF) (in Russian and English). Наука. ISBN 978-5-02-003567-6.
