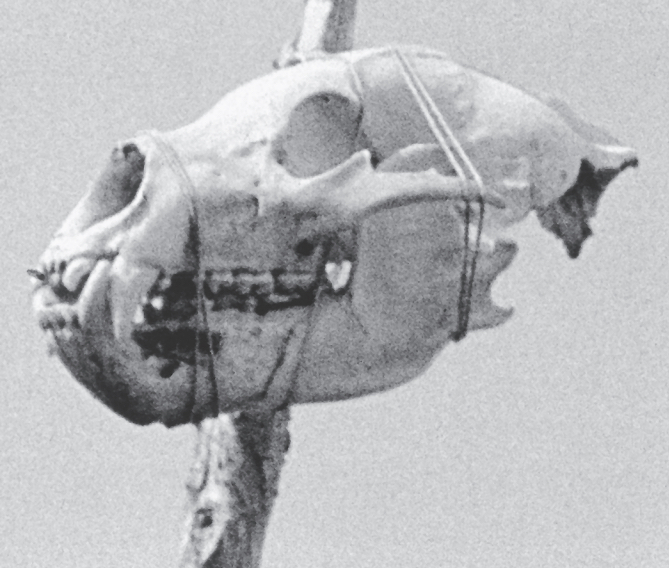
- 1910 photograph

Conservation status
- Presumed Extinct (NatureServe)(~1950)

- Extinct (COSEWIC)

Scientific classification
- Kingdom: Animalia
- Phylum: Chordata
- Class: Mammalia
- Order: Carnivora
- Family: Ursidae
- Genus: Ursus
- Species: U. arctos
- Subspecies: U. a. horribilis
- Population: Ungava brown bear

= Ungava brown bear =

Ungava brown bear Temporal range: Late Pleistocene – Recent

Extinct population of grizzly bears

The Ungava brown bear is an extinct population of grizzly bear (Ursus arctos horribilis) that inhabited the forests of northern Quebec and Labrador until the early 20th century.

== Common names ==
Other names are the "Labrador grizzly bear" and "Labrador-Ungava grizzly".

== Distribution ==
The Ungava brown bear originally lived in the northern part of the Labrador Peninsula, known as the Ungava Peninsula in the Canadian provinces of Quebec and Labrador. Its habitat was similar to other grizzlies, including boreal forest and tundra.

== Discovery ==
Until concrete evidence suggesting its existence was discovered in 1975, biologists typically discounted the idea that a grizzly bear had once roamed northern Quebec. Various reports of brown bears from 1900 to 1950 were written off as colour morphs of the more common American black bear. Reports of its existence were doubtful at best until a skull was unearthed by anthropologist Steven Cox in 1975.

=== Early evidence ===
One of the earliest pieces of evidence supporting the existence of a grizzly bear in Labrador is a map of the region drawn in 1550 by French cartographer Pierre Desceliers, which depicts three bears on the coast. One bear is white and is certainly a polar bear, while the other two are brown.

In the late 1700s, Labrador area trader George Cartwright wrote in his journal of a bear with markings consistent to those of young grizzly bears:

The beasts, are bears both black and white (of the latter I am told there are two kinds, one of which have a white ring around their necks...and the Esquimaux say, "They are very ferocious," but I never saw one of them, or even a skin)

— George Cartwright,

Fur trappers' reports from local Moravian mission posts indicate that brown bear pelts were regularly recorded from the 1830s to the 1850s.

==== Photographic evidence ====
The first photographic evidence of brown bears in Labrador dates to 1910. American ethnologist and northern explorer William Brooks Cabot made several visits to the Labrador region between 1899 and 1925, studying the Innu people. While on a canoeing expedition with Innu hunters, Cabot came upon and photographed a bear skull mounted on a pole. Upon examination of this photograph, by comparing it to other bear skulls, Harvard anthropologists Arthur Spiess and Stephen Loring concluded in 2007 that the skull belonged to a small brown bear.

=== Okak excavation ===
In the summer of 1975, Harvard anthropologist Steven Cox discovered a small bear skull while excavating an Inuit midden on Okak Island, near Okak in Labrador. The specimen consists of a nearly complete cranium, as well as several molars. The skull is the property of Newfoundland and Labrador and is held in the Provincial Museum of Newfoundland and Labrador. By studying wear on the molars, Cox determined that the skull belonged to a full-grown but small female grizzly bear.

=== George River ===
In 1910, a skull found east of the George River at an Innu camp was photographed and later determined to be a grizzly bear. The discovery of more bear bones in the area is thought to be unlikely, due to the Innu practice of consuming, utilizing or otherwise disposing of every part of hunted animals.

== Extinction ==
It is not known exactly when the Ungava brown bear died out, but reports of their sightings slowly declined throughout the 19th and 20th centuries, and the population was most likely extinct by the latter part of the 20th century, at least partly due to fur trapping.
