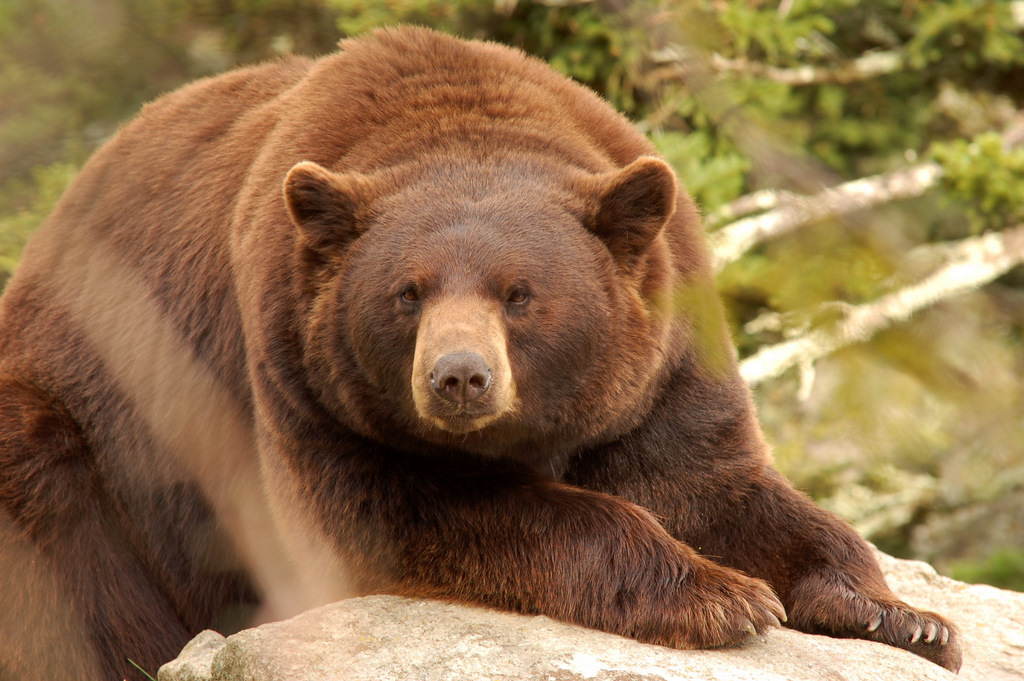
- Captive cinnamon bear 'Kodiak'

Conservation status
- Secure (NatureServe)

Scientific classification
- Kingdom: Animalia
- Phylum: Chordata
- Class: Mammalia
- Order: Carnivora
- Family: Ursidae
- Genus: Ursus
- Species: U. americanus
- Subspecies: U. a. cinnamomum

Trinomial name
- Ursus americanus cinnamomum Audubon and Bachman, 1854

= Cinnamon bear =

Subspecies of carnivore

The cinnamon bear (Ursus americanus cinnamomum) is both a highly variable color morph and a subspecies of the American black bear, native to the North America.

As a subspecies, it therefore most likely exists alongside the mostly black-colored eastern American black bear present in those regions, and breeds with it. Although there are also small populations located in the north east foothills and mountains of California, above 3,000 ft (910 m) elevation. The most striking difference between a cinnamon bear and any other black bear is its brown or red-brown fur (reminiscent of cinnamon), blocky head, and often a storage of fat causing a small hump on its back near the neck/shoulder. The subspecies was given this designation because the lighter color phase is more common there than in other areas. It is proposed that the brownish coats actually mimic a grizzly bear.

== Description ==
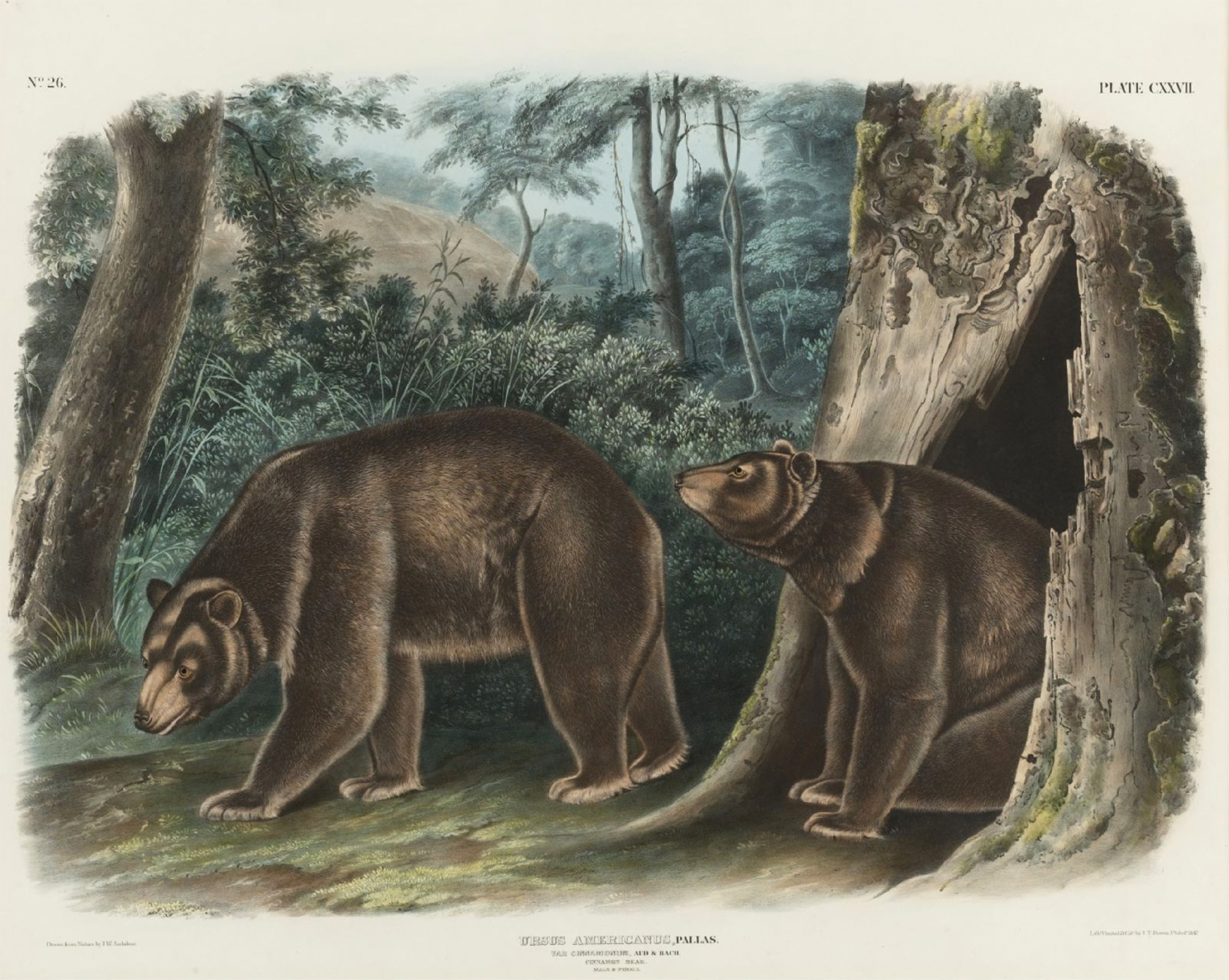
Cinnamon bear by J.T. Bowen (after John James Audubon)

The various color morphs are frequently intermixed in the same family; hence, seeing either a black-colored female with brown or red-brown cubs, a brown-colored female with black or red-brown cubs, or a female of any one of the three colors with a black cub, a brown cub and a red-brown cub, is a common occurrence.

A typical adult cinnamon bear weighs 90 to 270 kg (200 to 600 lb), however, this can vary depending on the seasonal food supply.

== Behavior ==
Like other American black bear subspecies, the cinnamon bear is omnivorous. Its diet includes fruit, vegetation, nuts, honey, and occasionally insects and meat, varying from other subspecies because of regional habitat differences. They are well adapted to their lowland and mountainous habitat, being proficient in climbing and swimming. The cinnamon bear is mostly nocturnal, but is active during the day on occasion.

The bear hibernates during the winter, usually from late October or November to March or April, depending upon the weather conditions. Its scat resembles that of the domestic dog.

== Distribution ==
Established populations are found in Colorado, New Mexico, Arizona, Utah, Idaho, Nevada, Montana, Washington, Manitoba, Minnesota, Wisconsin, Wyoming, California, Alberta, Ontario, and British Columbia. It is also present in Pennsylvania, Tennessee, Quebec, and New York.

== See also ==
- Kermode bear, another variant of the American black bear
- Confusion between the cinnamon bear and Ungava grizzly
