= Ombrastacoides =

Scientific classification
- Kingdom: Animalia
- Phylum: Arthropoda
- Clade: Pancrustacea
- Class: Malacostraca
- Order: Decapoda
- Suborder: Pleocyemata
- Family: Parastacidae
- Genus: Ombrastacoides; Hansen & Richardson, 2006

Type species
- Parastacoides leptomerus Riek, 1951

Species
- O. asperrimanus Hansen & Richardson, 2006; O. brevirostris Hansen & Richardson, 2006; O. decemdentatus Hansen & Richardson, 2006; O. denisoni Hansen & Richardson, 2006; O. dissitus Hansen & Richardson, 2006; O. huonensis Hansen & Richardson, 2006; O. ingressus Hansen & Richardson, 2006; O. leptomerus (Riek, 1951); O. parvicaudatus Hansen & Richardson, 2006; O. professorum Hansen & Richardson, 2006; O. pulcher (Riek, 1967)
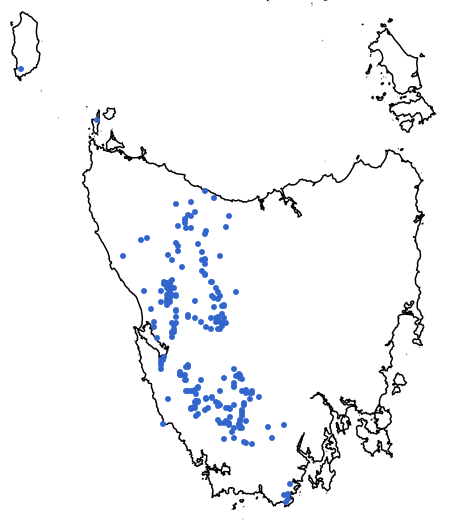
- Distribution of Ombrastacoides in Tasmania. Data from the Atlas of Living Australia.

Genus of burrowing crayfish

Ombrastacoides is a genus of burrowing freshwater crayfish, referred to with its sister genus Spinastacoides, as rain crayfish. It is one of five genera of Tasmanian freshwater crayfish, is endemic to Tasmania and currently contains 11 species. Rain crayfish are widely distributed in sedgeland ecosystems, including buttongrass (Gymnoschoenus sphaerocephalus) moorlands, swamps and heathy slopes in the western half of Tasmania. These genera are considered keystone species and ecosystem engineers in sedgeland ecosystems due to the impacts of their burrowing habits on soil structure, habitat for other invertebrates, and possibly vegetation. Several species of Ombrastacoides are threatened, including two listed critically endangered on the IUCN Red List

== Etymology ==
"Ombros" means "rain storm" in Greek, reflecting the high rainfall in the range of Ombrastacoides. Astacoides is a related genus from Madagascar, its name derived from Greek "astakos" meaning "smooth lobster".

== Taxonomy ==
The genus Ombrastacoides, in the family Parastacidae, was established in 2006 by Hansen and Richardson. Prior to this revision, the literature on the biology of what is now Ombrastacoides referred to these species as Parastacoides tasmanicus tasmanicus.

The crustaceans now known as Ombrastacoides were originally described as Astacus tasmanicus by Erichson in 1846. Clark erected the genus Parastacoides tasmanicus in 1936, without viewing Erichson's type specimen. In 1969, Riek described further species of Parastacoides, but in 1979 Sumner sunk these into P. tasmanicus with three subspecies P. tasmanicus tasmanicus, P. tasmanicus insignis and P. tasmanicus inermis. However, a 2006 revision by Hansen & Richardson revealed that the Parastacoides type specimen is actually a specimen of the genus Geocharax Clark, 1936, so the genus Parastacoides became a junior synonym of Geocharax and the single Tasmanian species of Geocharax, G. gracilis, was reassigned to G. tasmanicus.

However, the Parastacoides tasmanicus subspecies were not reallocated to Geocharax. Hansen & Richardson raised P. tasmanicus insignis and P. tasmanicus inermis to species level and placed them in the new genus Spinastacoides, becoming S. insignis and S. inermis, while placing two of Riek's species and nine newly described species in the new genus Ombrastacoides.

== Evolution and phylogeny ==
Molecular analysis of Ombrastacoides and Spinastacoides reveals that Australian crayfish are not monophyletic, as these two genera form a clade with Paraphrenops and Astacoides, from New Zealand and Madagascar, respectively. Thus Ombrastacoides and Spinastacoides are more closely related to these genera than other Australian genera, which form a sister clade comprising three divergent groups.

== Distribution and habitat ==
Ombrastacoides is restricted to the western half of Tasmania, as is Spinastacoides. A combination of rainfall and evaporation rate appears to be the main factor limiting their eastward range, since both genera require some burrow moisture during the summer months. Ombrastacoides is absent from much of the range of Spinastacoides, which occupies the far south and southwestern coastal regions. Ombrastacoides is absent from the northwest of Tasmania, perhaps excluded by Engaeus and Geocharax species.

== Diagnostic features ==
Spinastacoides and Ombrastacoides can be separated by the presence or absence of a terminal mesial (central) spine on the uropod exopod, the presence of which gives rise to the name Spinastacoides. These two genera differ from Engaeus and Geocharax in that the branchiocardiac groove on the side of the carapace runs parallel with the cervical groove, whereas in Engaeus and Geocharax the grooves fuse. Ombrastacoides and Spinastacoides can be distinguished from Astacopsis by their lack of spines or tubercles on the abdominal segments. They can be distinguished from Cherax (a non-native genus in Tasmania) by the orientation of the claws: vertical to oblique in Ombrastacoides and Spinastacoides, horizontal in Cherax.

There are few useful diagnostic characteristics between species within genera Ombrastacoides and Spinastacoides, as species in both genera are highly conservative morphologically.

== Biology and ecology ==
=== Physiology ===
These animals typically weigh 1–3 g and are only a few centimetres in length, The smallest species, O. parvicaudatus ranges from 2.38–18.86 mm occipital carapace length (OCL) and the largest species can reach over 30 mm OCL.

To combat the low pH of the sedgeland soils, these peat burrowing crayfish have adapted the calcification of the exoskeleton, concentrating calcium in the areas that experience heavy wear: the front of the carapace and tips of the claws and tail.

=== Behaviour ===
Most Ombrastacoides species are primary burrowers, which means they are restricted to their burrows for most of their lives. This contrasts with secondary burrowers, which leave their burrows when the ground is flooded, and tertiary burrowers, which live primarily in open water. The burrows are deep enough to be in contact with the water table for most of the year, except for short periods in summer. Burrows are usually less than a metre deep but can exceed 2 m in the deep soil of valley floors, and burrow density can reach one system per square metre. The burrows can have five or more surface openings, which descend to a terminal chamber. They are reused by multiple individuals rather than constructed fresh, with animals appearing to move into larger burrows as they grow.

It is thought that the burrowing behaviour and form of Ombrastacoides is strongly influenced by its diet.

=== Diet ===
Ombrastacoides species spend most of their time foraging in their burrow systems and are omnivorous, with seasonal variations in food categories. Detritus is a major food component, with root and algal matter also important, animal material (e.g. Oligochaete worms) minimal, and cannibalism much less frequent than in other reported crayfish species. Adults of O. huonensis were found to mainly consume roots and leaves of sedges, while the diet of juveniles consumed a larger component of animal material.

=== Reproduction ===
Breeding is biennial in those Ombrastacoides species that have been studied, with mating occurring in late autumn, eggs carried through winter and hatchlings remaining in the burrow throughout the following winter. It is thought that this extended breeding pattern could be due to the challenges of the nutrient-poor environment.

=== Environment and ecology ===
The heath and sedgeland communities in which Ombrastacoides live are characterised by their waterlogged, low-nutrient soils with relatively low temperatures and low pH. Such habitats are not known to support dense populations of burrowing crayfish anywhere in the world except in western Tasmania. More than one species of crayfish may occur at the same location, usually partitioning the habitat on the basis of soil drainage.

Ombrastacoides and the other peat burrowing crayfish are known as ecosystem engineers because they create macropores that affect the drainage of the peat and hence soil formation and their burrows also create habitat for other animals. Burrow wall area of a system often exceeds the area of the soil surface above it, and burrows provide a conduit for water and gases through the consolidated, waterlogged peat. Rootlets grow strongly on the tunnel walls, and soil respiration rate around burrows is significantly higher than deep in the soil.

The excavations of peat burrowing crayfish provide habitat for several other invertebrate species.. Crayfish burrows provide habitat for diverse faunal assemblages, known as "pholeteros" (e.g. nematodes, oligochaetes, copepods, isopods and amphipods). Partial collapse of large burrow systems forms pools that provide habitat for aquatic animals, for example two species of Gondwanan syncarid crustaceans, pygmy mountain shrimps Allanaspides hickmani and A. helonomus and the endemic Tasmanian Spotwing dragonfly Synthemiopsis gomphomacromioides, also of Gondwanan origins. There is evidence that burrows might affect the growth of surrounding plants, but the effect is not clear

As a result of these ecological effects, species of Ombrastacoides are regarded as keystone species in these sedgeland ecosystems.

== Threats and conservation ==
Two species are listed on the IUCN Red List as critically endangered: O. denisoni, the Denison rain crayfish and O. parvicaudatus, the Short-tailed rain crayfish, which was until 2020 thought to be extinct due to the flooding of the King River system to create Lake Burbury.

Threats include any processes that affect water, soil structure and food supply, such as road construction, clearing, burning too frequently and conversion to plantations. Climate change, particularly higher temperatures and reduced rainfall, are a major threat to the rain crayfish and it is likely that the eastern edge of the genus's distribution will retreat westwards. An increase in frequency of fires created by dry lightning storms, such as those experienced in Tasmania in the summer of 2018-2019, could also contribute to such a contraction of range.
