= Engaewa similis =

- Diagram adapted from Riek, 1967

Conservation status
- Least Concern (IUCN 3.1)

Scientific classification
- Kingdom: Animalia
- Phylum: Arthropoda
- Class: Malacostraca
- Order: Decapoda
- Suborder: Pleocyemata
- Family: Parastacidae
- Genus: Engaewa
- Species: E. similis

Binomial name
- Engaewa similis Riek, 1967

Species of crayfish

Engaewa similis is a species of Australian crayfish in the family Parastacidae.

== Distribution and conservation ==
E. similis is endemic to the Augusta region in Western Australia, and can be found from the Margaret River to the vicinity of Windy Harbour. Although previously considered an endangered species, E. similis is now listed as a species of Least Concern on the IUCN Red List, since it is abundant at the sites where it persists.

== Description ==
An adult female holotype (a single physical example of the species) was found in Augusta, Western Australia by L. P. Smith in 1961. In 1967, E. F. Riek gave detailed description of the holotype, held at the Western Australian Museum; it was 36 millimetres (1.4 in) long (cephalothorax 16.5 mm or 0.65 in), with a blue colour on the chela, and was similar to Engaewa reducta apart from the shape of the rostrum, the structure of the chela and the shape of the telson and uropods.
