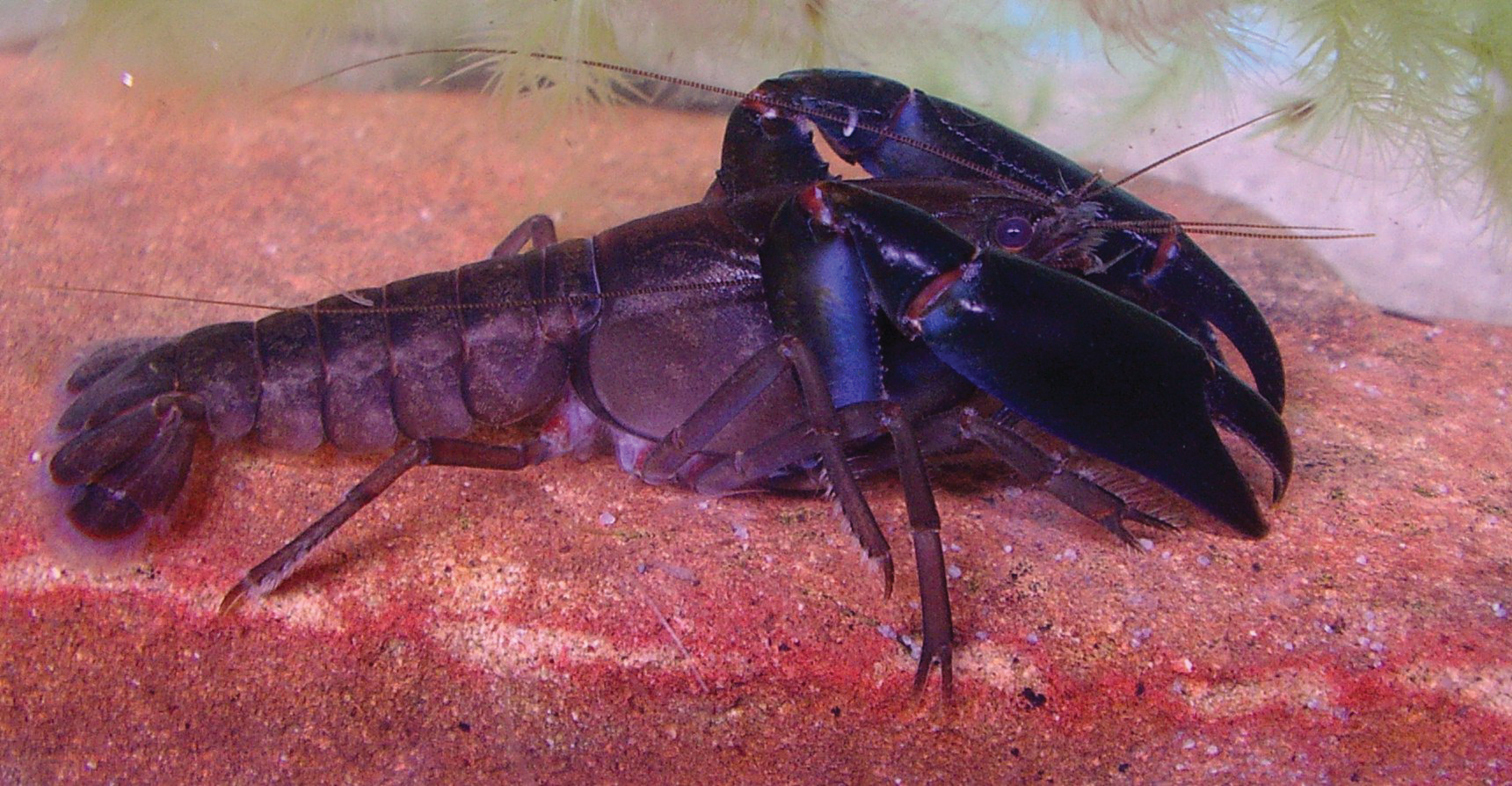
- Gramastacus lacus

Scientific classification
- Kingdom: Animalia
- Phylum: Arthropoda
- Clade: Pancrustacea
- Class: Malacostraca
- Order: Decapoda
- Suborder: Pleocyemata
- Family: Parastacidae
- Genus: Gramastacus
- Species: G. lacus

Binomial name
- Gramastacus lacus McCormack, 2014
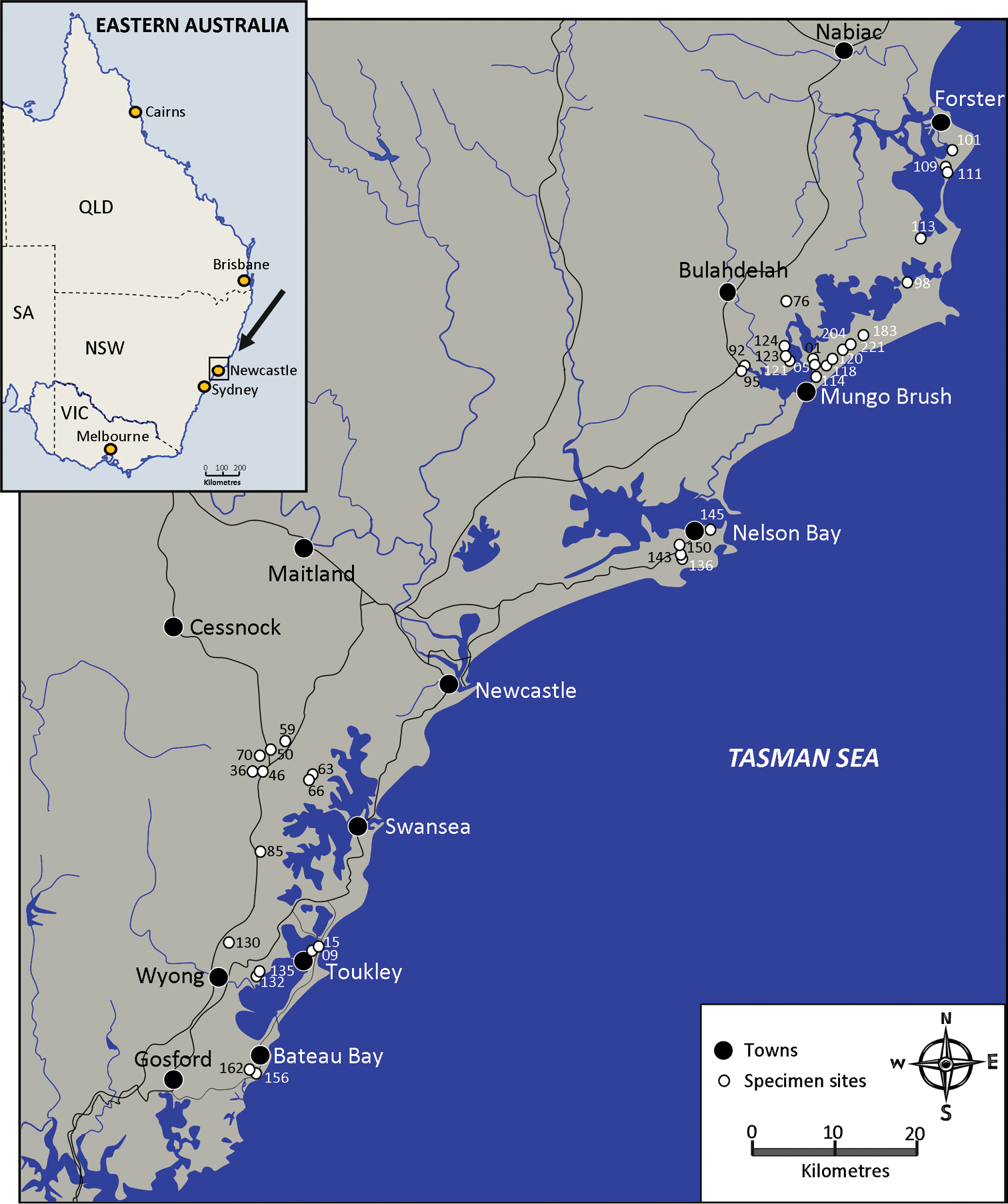
- Distribution in Eastern Australia

= Eastern swamp crayfish =

Species of crayfish

The eastern swamp crayfish (Gramastacus lacus) is a species of small freshwater crayfish from coastal New South Wales, Australia. It is distinguished from related species by large genital papilla on the males, large raised postorbital ridges, a laterally compressed carapace, and elongated chelae.

== Etymology ==
The specific name is derived from Latin lacus, referring to the coastal lakes that the species is found in. Before it was formally described it was known by the common name "lake yabby".

== Discovery ==
Specimens of Gramastacus lacus were first discovered in the Ramsar wetlands of Myall Lakes National Park. More specimens were collected as part of the Australian Crayfish Project, starting in 2005.

== Description ==
The species reaches a maximum weight of 7 grams (0.25 oz) and a length of 21.32 millimetres (0.839 in). The vast majority of specimens are smaller, with the average weight being around 4 grams (0.14 oz) to 5 grams (0.18 oz). The rostrum is long and narrow with a spine at the apex. The abdomen is smooth and unarmored, and thinly covered in stiff setae. The tailfan is U-shaped. The first cheliped is smooth and distinctly longer than the other legs. The species is sexually dimorphic, with males having significantly larger chelae than females while females have broader abdomens.

Coloration varies among populations. The dorsal parts of the thorax and abdomen will often be light brown, green, tan, or steel blue and patterned with red or cream-colored spots. The cephalon is usually black or brown on the dorsal surface, with lighter toned blue highlights on the lateral edges. The body's ventral surface is cream-colored or transparent. The first chelae are black to dark blue, with bright blue coloration along the edges and red joints.

Juveniles are uniformly light blue in color.

== Range and habitat ==
Gramastacus lacus is found in a number of geographically isolated populations along the Central and Mid North Coast of New South Wales, Australia. It is native to coastal lowlands from Wamberal Lagoon to Wamberal Lagoon, usually 3 metres (9.8 ft) to 48 metres (157 ft) above sea level. Populations typically occur in ephemeral wetlands such as small creeks and swamps, in depths no greater than 1 metre (3.3 ft). Population density varies between 1 and 35 individuals per square meter depending on the environment.

== Behavior ==
Unlike its relative the western swamp crayfish (Gramastacus insolitus), the eastern swamp crayfish excavates burrows to survive during the dry season, when the water bodies it inhabits dry up. Burrows are typically between 450 millimetres (18 in) and 750 millimetres (30 in) deep, although some have been observed as deep as 1 metre (3.3 ft). Sometimes burrows will have a round chamber at the end or be capped with mud. Occasionally a juvenile will be found sharing a burrow with an adult.

Gramastacus lacus often hides in the thick reeds and grass along the shore to avoid predators such as speckled longfin eels, carp gudgeons, giant water bugs, eastern long-necked turtles, and Australian water dragons, as well numerous species of birds. The only individuals to seek out deeper water are recently moulted ones, likely in an attempt to avoid being cannibalized.

The crayfish will use its enlarged claws for defense while in the water, but when on land will usually elect to scuttle backward rapidly instead.

== Reproduction ==
The eastern swamp crayfish is an opportunistic breeder, breeding whenever the vernal pools they inhabit are flooded, usually beginning in early August. Females lay 30-150 eggs of a dark olive green or dark purple color. The eggs will hatch after 6–8 weeks, usually in late October.

== Conservation threats ==
The eastern swamp crayfish is found in parts of Australia's fastest developing areas, leading to their habitat being potentially threatened as swamps and wetlands are drained to make way for agriculture, industry, housing developments, and golf courses. The species is also threatened by the invasive common yabby (Cherax destructor), which has been introduced into G. lacus's habitats in the Wamberal Lagoon.
