= Astacoides granulimanus =

Conservation status
- Least Concern (IUCN 3.1)

Scientific classification
- Kingdom: Animalia
- Phylum: Arthropoda
- Class: Malacostraca
- Order: Decapoda
- Suborder: Pleocyemata
- Family: Parastacidae
- Genus: Astacoides
- Species: A. granulimanus

Binomial name
- Astacoides granulimanus Monod & Petit, 1929

Species of crayfish

Astacoides granulimanus is a species of southern crawfish in the family Parastacidae.

The IUCN conservation status of Astacoides granulimanus is "LC", least concern, with no immediate threat to the species' survival. The population is decreasing. The IUCN status was reviewed in 2016.
