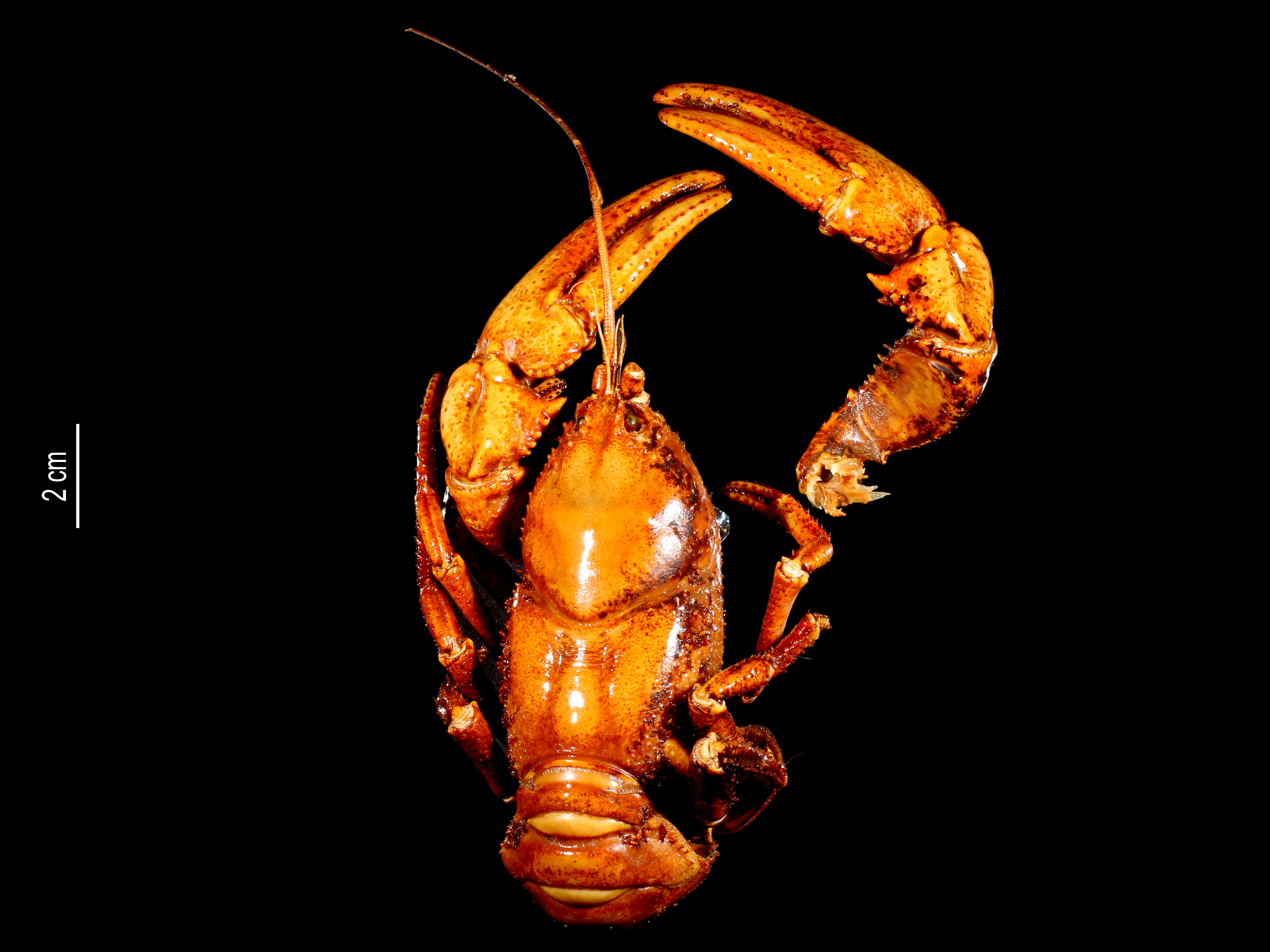
- Astacoides madagascarensis

Conservation status
- Least Concern (IUCN 3.1)

Scientific classification
- Kingdom: Animalia
- Phylum: Arthropoda
- Class: Malacostraca
- Order: Decapoda
- Suborder: Pleocyemata
- Family: Parastacidae
- Genus: Astacoides
- Species: A. madagascarensis

Binomial name
- Astacoides madagascarensis (H.Milne Edwards & Audouin, 1839)

= Astacoides madagascarensis =

Species of crayfish

Astacoides madagascarensis is a species of southern crawfish in the family Parastacidae.

The IUCN conservation status of Astacoides madagascarensis is "LC", least concern, with no immediate threat to the species' survival. The IUCN status was reviewed in 2016.
