= Astacoides hobbsi =

Conservation status
- Vulnerable (IUCN 3.1)

Scientific classification
- Kingdom: Animalia
- Phylum: Arthropoda
- Class: Malacostraca
- Order: Decapoda
- Suborder: Pleocyemata
- Family: Parastacidae
- Genus: Astacoides
- Species: A. hobbsi

Binomial name
- Astacoides hobbsi Boyko, Ravoahangimalala, Randriamasimanana & Razafindrazaka, 2005

Species of crayfish

Astacoides hobbsi is a species of southern crawfish in the family Parastacidae.

The IUCN conservation status of Astacoides hobbsi is "VU", vulnerable. The species faces a high risk of endangerment in the medium term. The IUCN status was reviewed in 2016.
