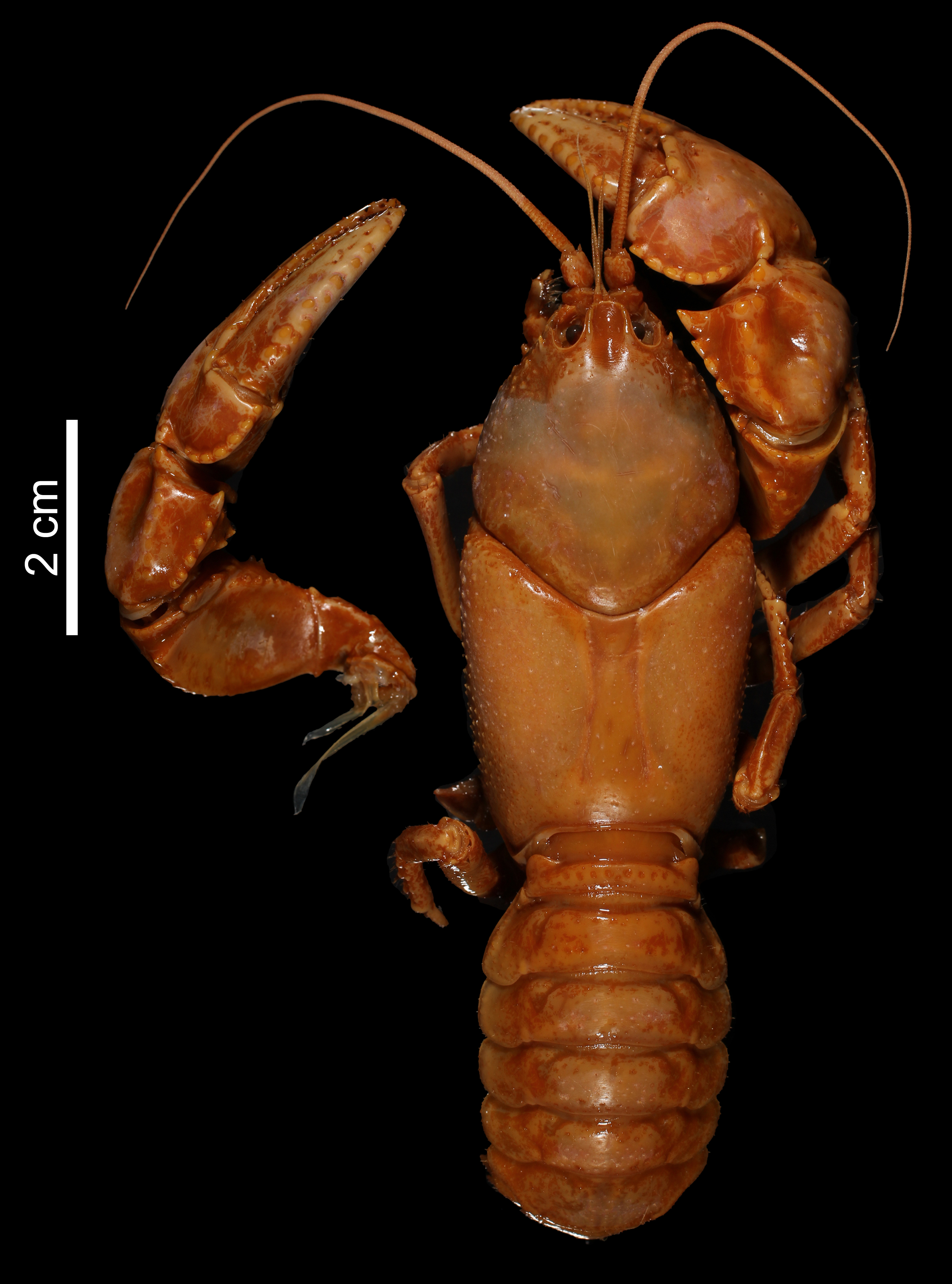

Conservation status
- Vulnerable (IUCN 3.1)

Scientific classification
- Kingdom: Animalia
- Phylum: Arthropoda
- Class: Malacostraca
- Order: Decapoda
- Suborder: Pleocyemata
- Family: Parastacidae
- Genus: Astacoides
- Species: A. crosnieri

Binomial name
- Astacoides crosnieri Hobbs, 1987

= Astacoides crosnieri =

Species of crayfish

Astacoides crosnieri is a species of crustacean in family Parastacidae. It is endemic to Madagascar, being widespread in the former Province Fianatantsoa. A. crosnieri inhabits swampy areas at an elevation between 500 – 1000 m above sea level.

The populations are threatened by habitate loss and predation pressure from introduced species. Since A. crosnieri has a muddy taste and their habitat is difficult to access, A. crosnieri is less targeted by fisheries compared to other species of the genus Astacoides.

== Conservation ==
Apart from a general law to prevent harvesting of crayfish under 10 cm total length, there are no laws that protect A. crosnieri. In 1996, A. crosnieri was assessed as Endangered on the IUCN Red List. This assessment was changed in June 2010 to Data Deficient. However, since the populations are decreasing is must be assumed that sufficient data would only lead to a reassessment as Endangered or worse.
