= Virilastacus =

Scientific classification
- Kingdom: Animalia
- Phylum: Arthropoda
- Class: Malacostraca
- Order: Decapoda
- Suborder: Pleocyemata
- Family: Parastacidae
- Genus: Virilastacus; Hobbs, 1991

Type species
- Virilastacus araucanius

Species
- 4, See text.

Genus of crayfishes

Virilastacus is a genus of freshwater burrowing crayfish species endemic to Chile. It has four described species. The first species was described in 1914, but since 2005, three other species have been added to this genus.

== Species ==
- Virilastacus araucanius Faxon, 1914
- Virilastacus jarai Erich H. Rudolph and Keith A. Crandall, 2012
- Virilastacus retamali Erich H. Rudolph and Keith A. Crandall, 2007
- Virilastacus rucapihuelensis Rudolph and Crandall, 2005
