= Virilastacus araucanius =

Conservation status
- Data Deficient (IUCN 3.1)

Scientific classification
- Kingdom: Animalia
- Phylum: Arthropoda
- Class: Malacostraca
- Order: Decapoda
- Suborder: Pleocyemata
- Family: Parastacidae
- Genus: Virilastacus
- Species: V. araucanius

Binomial name
- Virilastacus araucanius Faxon, 1914

Synonyms
- Samastacus araucanius

Species of crayfish

Virilastacus araucanius is a burrowing species of crayfish in the family Parastacidae, endemic to Chile.

== Conservation status ==
Virilastacus araucanius is listed as Data Deficient by the IUCN.
