= Astacoides caldwelli =

Conservation status
- Vulnerable (IUCN 3.1)

Scientific classification
- Kingdom: Animalia
- Phylum: Arthropoda
- Class: Malacostraca
- Order: Decapoda
- Suborder: Pleocyemata
- Family: Parastacidae
- Genus: Astacoides
- Species: A. caldwelli

Binomial name
- Astacoides caldwelli (Bate, 1865)

Species of crayfish

Astacoides caldwelli is a species of crustacean in family Parastacidae. It is endemic to Madagascar. A. caldwelli is mostly found in rivers draining forested areas at elevations between 600 - 800m. The populations are threatened by habitat loss as well as predation by introduced species and harvesting at a subsistence level from local fishermen.
