= Swamp crayfish =

The common name swamp crayfish may refer to any of several species:

- Tenuibranchiurus glypticus
- Procambarus clarkii, the "red swamp crayfish"
- Euastacus australasiensis
- Astacus leptodactylus, the "narrow-clawed crayfish"
