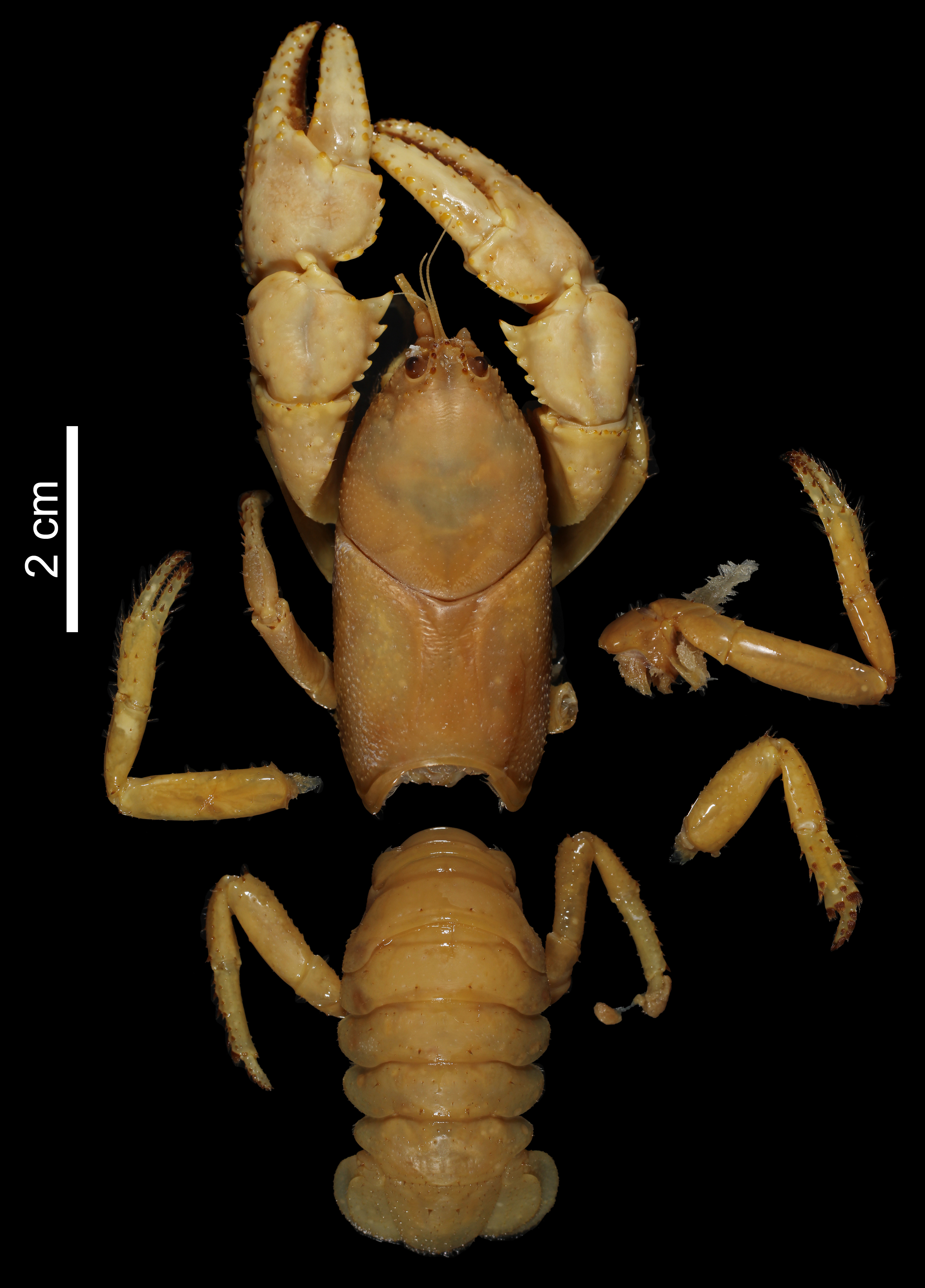

Conservation status
- Data Deficient (IUCN 3.1)

Scientific classification
- Kingdom: Animalia
- Phylum: Arthropoda
- Class: Malacostraca
- Order: Decapoda
- Suborder: Pleocyemata
- Family: Parastacidae
- Genus: Astacoides
- Species: A. petiti

Binomial name
- Astacoides petiti Hobbs, 1987

= Astacoides petiti =

Species of crayfish

Astacoides petiti, commonly known as Orana, is a species of southern crayfish in the family Parastacidae. Along with their congeners in the genus Astacoides, they are endemic to Madagascar.
