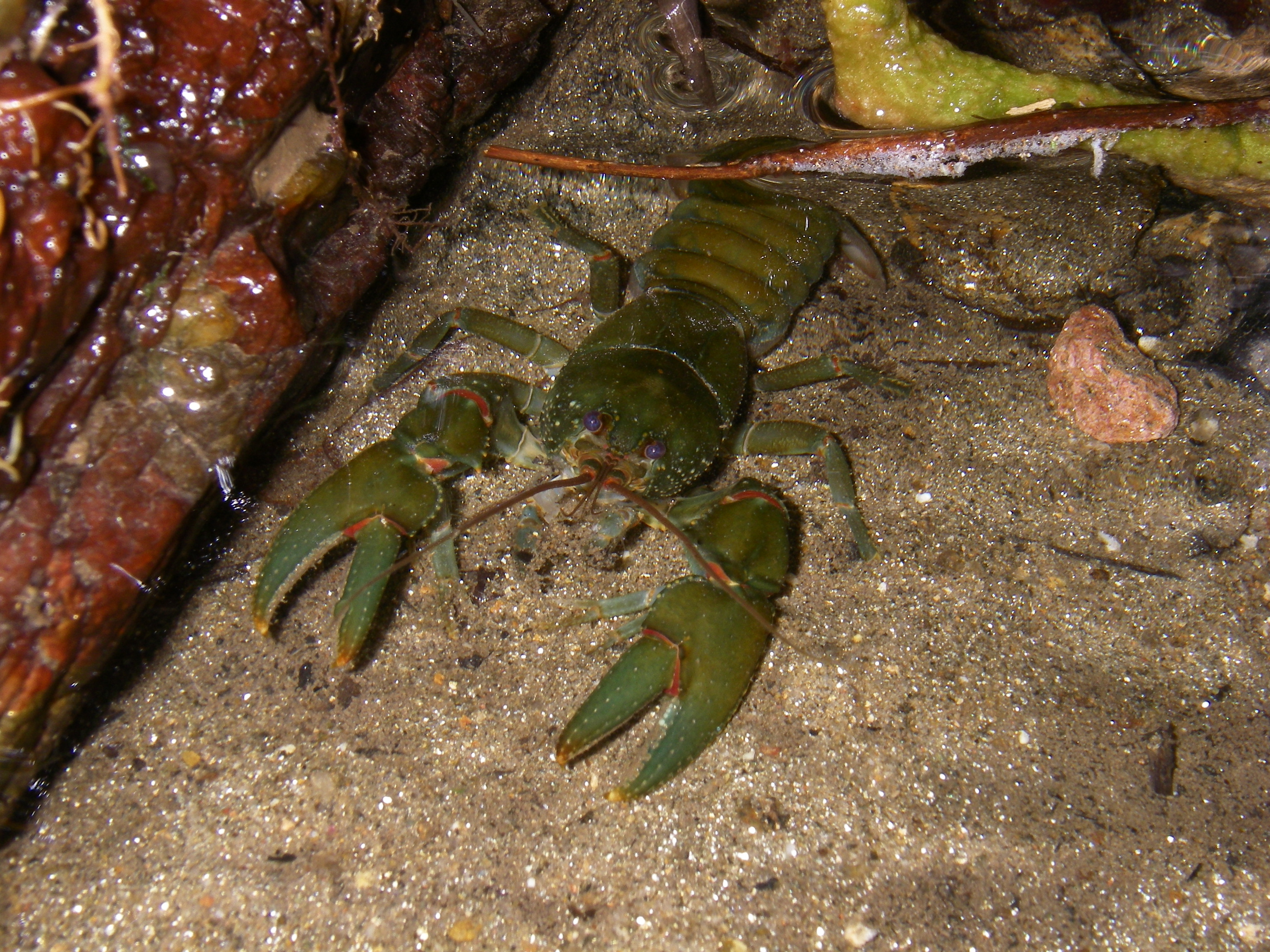

Conservation status
- Vulnerable (IUCN 3.1)

Scientific classification
- Kingdom: Animalia
- Phylum: Arthropoda
- Class: Malacostraca
- Order: Decapoda
- Suborder: Pleocyemata
- Family: Parastacidae
- Genus: Astacoides
- Species: A. betsileoensis

Binomial name
- Astacoides betsileoensis Petit, 1923

= Astacoides betsileoensis =

Species of crayfish

Astacoides betsileoensis is a species of crayfish in the family Parastacidae. It is endemic to Madagascar. The populations are threatened by habitat loss due to land conversion as well as harvesting for food from locals and predation from introduced species. As of 2010 there were no specific measures for conservation apart from a minimum size limit of 10 cm for harvesting. In some areas, local rules and taboos help controlling the pressure from harvesting.
