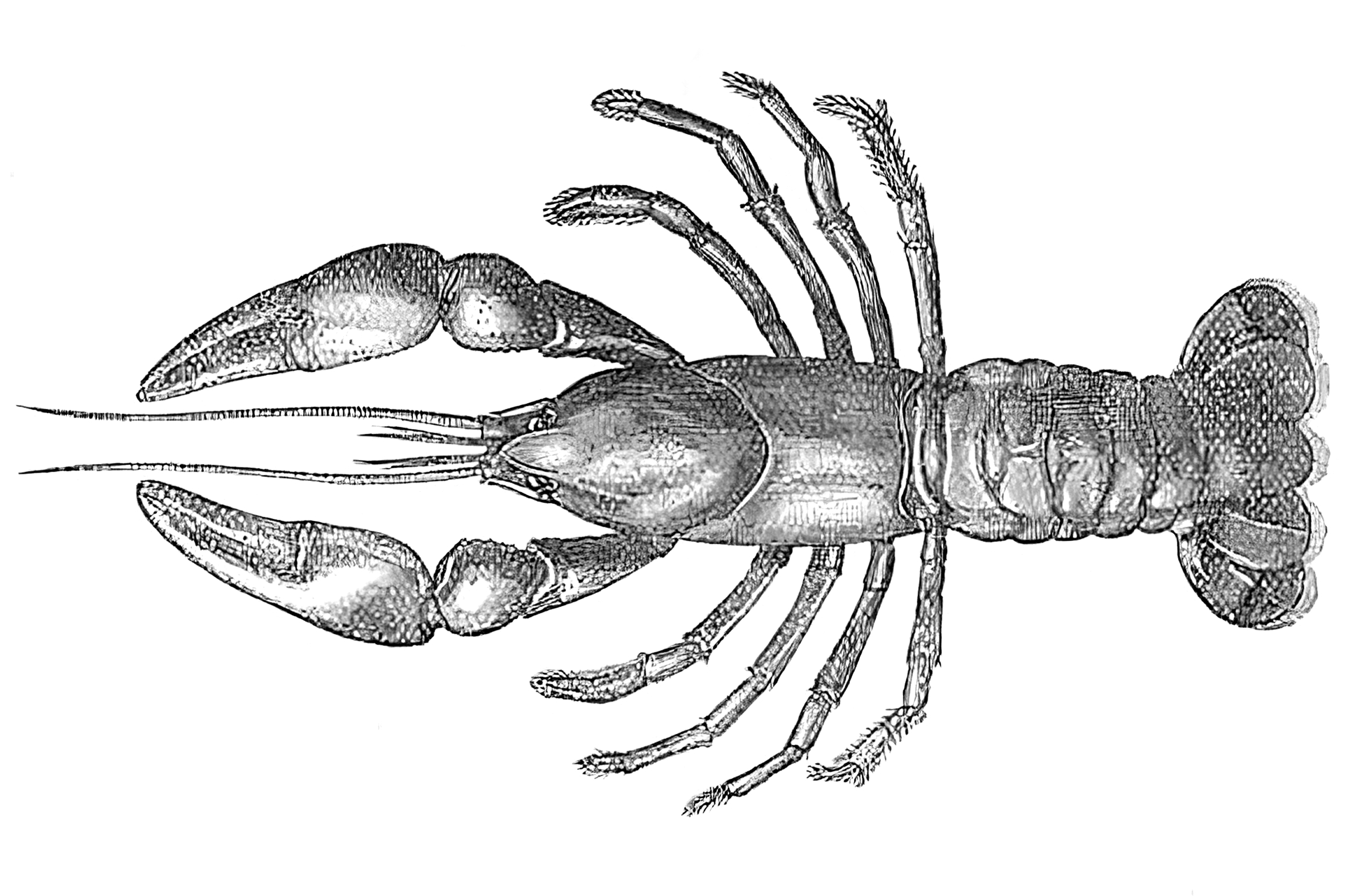

Conservation status
- Near Threatened (IUCN 3.1)

Scientific classification
- Kingdom: Animalia
- Phylum: Arthropoda
- Clade: Pancrustacea
- Class: Malacostraca
- Order: Decapoda
- Suborder: Pleocyemata
- Family: Parastacidae
- Genus: Parastacus
- Species: P. brasiliensis

Binomial name
- Parastacus brasiliensis (von Martens, 1869)

= Parastacus brasiliensis =

Species of crustacean

Parastacus brasiliensis is a species of freshwater crayfish in the family Parastacidae that is endemic to river basins of the Guaíba estuary, located in the central lowlands of Rio Grande do Sul in southern Brazil. It is a nocturnal, secondary-burrowing omnivore that plays a role in the energy transfer within its ecosystem and serves as a key biomarker for water quality.

== Taxonomy and history ==
Parastacus brasiliensis is one of six species of the genus Parastacus represented in Brazil and belongs to the northern group of South American parastacids.

The species was first described by Von Martens in 1869 under the genus Astacus, based on the specimens collected from Porto Alegre. In 1879, Thomas Henry Huxley moved the species to the genus Parastacus. Currently, there is only one subspecies recognized: P. brasiliensis promatensis.

== Distribution and habitat ==
Rio Grande do Sul in Brazil

The species is endemic to the Central Depression of the state of Rio Grande do Sul in southern Brazil, with an estimated extent of occurrence (EOC) of 14,691 km2. They typically inhabit lotic environments, specifically small flowing streams within the Guaíba estuary. Juveniles usually inhabit leaves and stones that have accumulated at the bottom of rivers and are rarely found in strong currents.

=== Microhabitat ===
They prefer areas with plant detritus and clay soils suitable for burrowing.

=== Migration ===
It is a non-migratory species with low dispersal rates.

== Ecology and behavior ==
Parastacus brasiliensis act as a key species in energy transfer in freshwater ecosystems and helps modify the physical environment through burrowing, influencing habitat structure, and ecosystem functioning.

=== Water quality ===
Parastacus brasiliensis’ sensitivity to environmental changes and long-life cycle make it a good biomarker or indicator species for water quality.

=== Circadian rhythms ===
The species is strictly nocturnal, exhibiting a clear circadian rhythm with peak activity occurring around midnight. During the day, they remain inactive and hidden. With their nighttime behaviors, including exploration, foraging, and mate-seeking.

== Burrowing habits ==
Parastacus brasiliensis is classified as a secondary burrower. While they spend over half their time inside complex burrows, also known as galleries, built into stream banks or ravines, they regularly emerge to forage and mate at night. With their behavior suggesting they have a hiding-based lifestyle.

=== Structure ===
Burrows typically feature a central chamber and multiple openings, usually at water depths of 20 to 30cm.

=== Function ===
Burrows provide protection from predators, prevent desiccation (drying out), and offer stable food resources.

== Diet ==
As omnivores, their diet consists of benthic invertebrates, detritus, macrophytes, and algae. They typically seize their food and return to the safety of their burrow to consume it.

== Anatomy ==
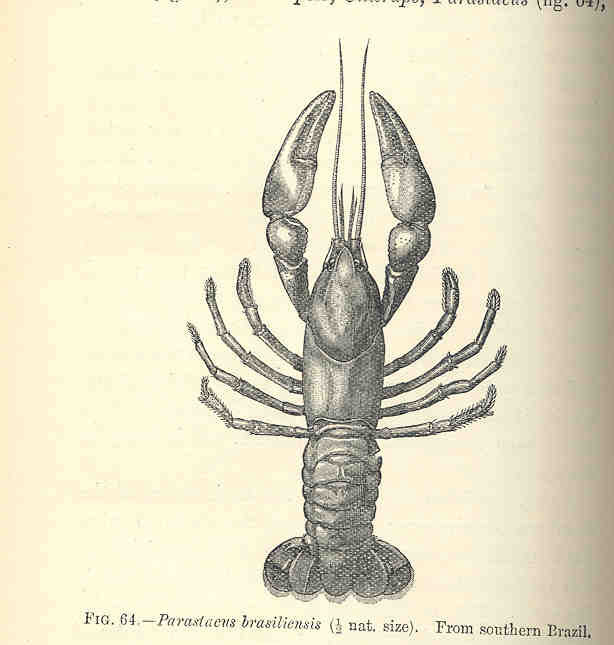
Photo of Parastacus brasiliensis

=== External morphology ===
The body is divided into a cephalothorax, covered by a carapace with distinct cervical grooves, and a segmented abdomen. There are no external morphological features that distinguish between males and females.

==== Appendages ====
Its appendages include antennae for sensory perception, specialized mouthparts for feeding, pereopods for walking (with some modified into claws), pleopods used in swimming and reproduction, and a tail fan composed of the telson and uropods.

==== Setae ====
The exoskeleton is covered in 13 types of hair-like setae, varying in shape and function, used to help with feeding, sensory, movement, filtering, and respiration.

Types of Setae
Type	Function
Simple setae	Lack cuticular projection; highly variable in length and thickness.
Hook setae	Very small, without cuticular projections.
Dentiform setae	Robust, obliquely inserted structures along segment axes.
Cuspidate and Conate setae	Stout, arrow-like setae with distinct basal rings (annulations).
Aesthetascs (Esthetes)	Specialized sensory setae on the antennae with a very thin apical cuticle.
Plumose, Papillary, and Serrated setae	Feature various arrangements of hairs (setules) or teeth (denticles) for specialized mechanical or sensory roles.
Multidenticulate and Plumodenticulate setae	Elongated setae with multiple rows of small teeth.
Setobranchiae	Very long, tapered setae with a recurved apex.
Teazel setae	Characterized by elongated denticles distal to a median ring.

==== Developmental changes ====
Juveniles possess hooks on their legs to cling to the mother; these are replaced by straight dactyls (claws) in adulthood.

==== Gills and respiration ====
The gills serve both respiratory and metabolic roles, accumulating elevated lactate concentrations during periods of stress.

=== Internal systems ===
==== Digestive ====
Parastacus brasiliensis have a highly developed digestive system featuring a large stomach for their omnivorous diet. Including ossicles and a gastric mill for grinding food. The inner lining of the cardiac stomach is covered with plumodenticulate setae.

==== Respiratory ====
They possess trichobranchiate gills, consisting of a central axis and lateral branches that carry afferent and efferent blood channels.

==== Metabolism ====
The hepatopancreas serves as the metabolic center, storing and releasing glycogen and lipids when experiencing environmental stress.

==== Circulatory system ====
The species possesses an open circulatory system, in which the heart distributed blood via several main arteries. Small arterioles specifically supply the mouthparts, such as the mandibles, maxillae, and maxillipeds.

== Feeding adaptations and sensory morphology ==
The feeding mechanism of P. brasiliensis is specialized, relying on a combination of mechanical manipulation and chemoreception.

=== Appendage specialization ===
The mouthparts and front legs (pereiopods) are specialized for the collection, manipulation, and processing of organic matter.

=== Hydrodynamics ===
Certain appendages are adapted to create water currents, which effectively draw floating food towards their mouth.

=== Chemoreception ===
Their exoskeleton is equipped with specialized sensory setae (chemoreceptors) that allow the species to help detect food.

== Reproduction ==
=== Hermaphroditism ===
Parastacus brasiliensis show partial sequential hermaphroditism, meaning they begin life functioning as males and later transition to females. This is seen from the presence of both male and female gonopores on the coxopodites (genital pores).

Female vs. Male Pores
Type	Shape and Location
Female	Oval-shaped and located on the 3rd pair of walking legs.
Male	Located on the 5th pair of walking legs.

=== Genital ducts ===
The species has two pairs of genital ducts: oviducts and vasa deferentia. When acting as females, individuals use only female apertures and anterior ducts (oviducts); when acting as males, only the male apertures and posterior ducts (vasa deferentia) are functional.

== Life cycle and development ==
The reproduction period lasts from September to February.

=== Maturity ===
Females reach sexual maturity at around 3 years (carapace length ~31.4mm). The number of eggs produced is related to the size of the female.

=== Parental care ===
Unlike many invertebrates, they show direct development and parental care. Eggs are incubated for ~41 days on the female’s pleopods.

=== Juvenile stages ===
Parastacus brasiliensis hatches as juveniles, not as larvae. Hatchlings pass through three stages. They remain attached to the mother’s pleopod for about 9 days or through Stage II before becoming independent in Stage III.

==== Stage I ====
Similar to adults in body shape, lacks setae on most appendages, has no uropods, and has hooks on legs.

==== Stage II ====
Has some of the same general form as Stage I, but has more states with greater variation.

==== Stage III ====
Fully developed adult-like features, uropods present, and hooks are replaced by straight dactyli, before becoming independent.

== Conservation status ==
The species is currently listed as Near Threatened. However, this is only suggested because of the lack of data due to the uncertainty about distribution and population trends.

=== Threats ===
Habitat loss due to urbanization, stream channelization, and agricultural runoff.

=== Pollution ===
As an indicator species, they are highly sensitive to industrial and urban pollutants.
