= Geocharax falcata =

Conservation status
- Vulnerable (IUCN 3.1)

Scientific classification
- Kingdom: Animalia
- Phylum: Arthropoda
- Clade: Pancrustacea
- Class: Malacostraca
- Order: Decapoda
- Suborder: Pleocyemata
- Family: Parastacidae
- Genus: Geocharax
- Species: G. falcata

Binomial name
- Geocharax falcata Clark, 1941

Species of crayfish

Geocharax falcata is a species of crayfish in the Geocharax genus. It was first described in 1941. It is endemic to Victoria, Australia, and is listed as vunerable by the IUCN.
