= Engaewa =

- Diagram of parts of the body of Engaewa similis (after Riek, 1967)

Scientific classification
- Kingdom: Animalia
- Phylum: Arthropoda
- Class: Malacostraca
- Order: Decapoda
- Suborder: Pleocyemata
- Family: Parastacidae
- Genus: Engaewa; Riek, 1967

Species
- Engaewa pseudoreducta; Engaewa reducta; Engaewa walpolea; Engaewa subcoerulea; Engaewa similis
- Range of Engaewa in Australia

Genus of crayfishes

Engaewa is a genus of burrowing crayfish belonging to the family Parastacidae. There are five recognised species, all endemic to the high-rainfall zone of south-west Western Australia, from Dunsborough to Albany. They are all small (up to 5 cm), and found only in freshwater swamps and seepages. Three of the five species are listed under the Environment Protection and Biodiversity Conservation Act 1999 (EPBC Act) and are listed on the IUCN Red List as "endangered" (EN) or "critically endangered" (CR), while the remaining two are listed as "Least Concern":

Species	Authority	EPBCA	IUCN
Engaewa pseudoreducta	Horwitz & Adams, 2000	critically endangered	CR
Engaewa reducta	Riek, 1967	endangered	EN
Engaewa similis	Riek, 1967	—	LC
Engaewa subcoerulea	Riek, 1967	—	LC
Engaewa walpolea	Horwitz & Adams, 2000	endangered	EN
