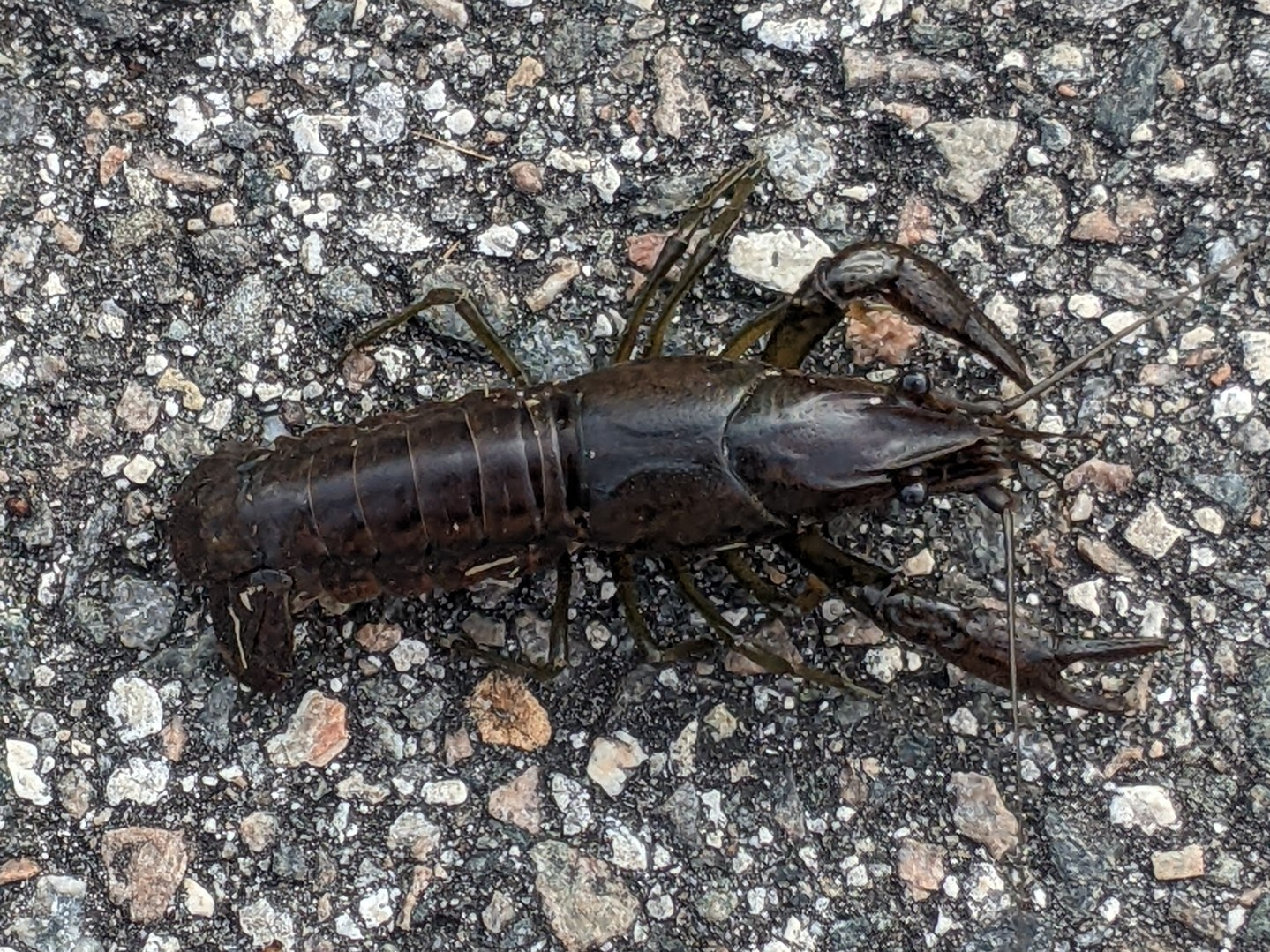

Conservation status
- Least Concern (IUCN 3.1)

- Secure (NatureServe)

Scientific classification
- Kingdom: Animalia
- Phylum: Arthropoda
- Class: Malacostraca
- Order: Decapoda
- Suborder: Pleocyemata
- Family: Cambaridae
- Genus: Procambarus
- Species: P. fallax

Binomial name
- Procambarus fallax (Hagen, 1870)

Synonyms
- Cambarus fallax Hagen, 1870

= Procambarus fallax =

Species of crayfish

Procambarus fallax (also known as deceitful crayfish or slough crayfish) is a species of crayfish in the genus Procambarus. It lives in tributaries of the Satilla River in Georgia and Florida. It is the closest relative to the parthenogenetic marbled crayfish, Procambarus virginalis.
