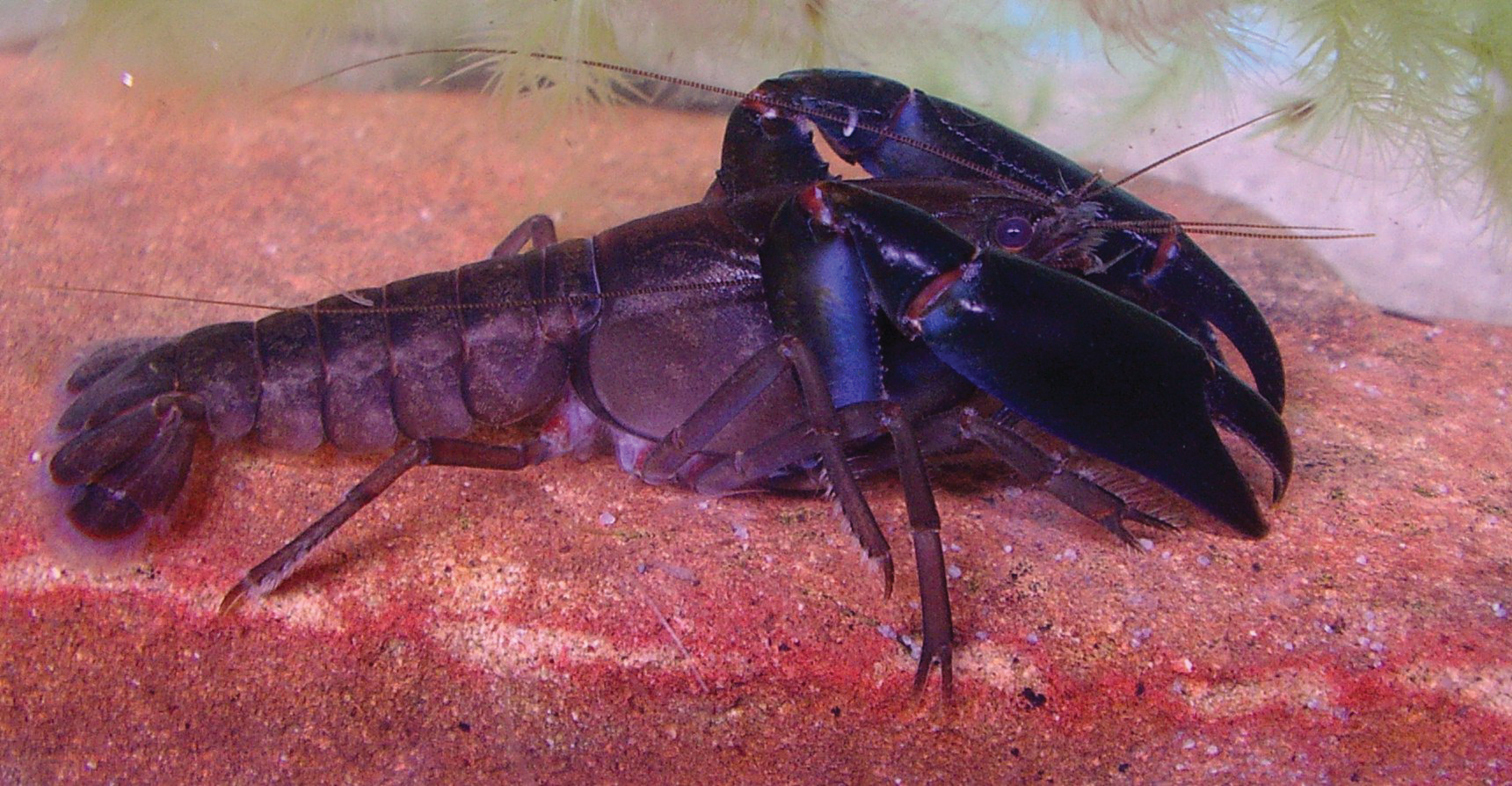
- Gramastacus lacus

Scientific classification
- Domain: Eukaryota
- Kingdom: Animalia
- Phylum: Arthropoda
- Class: Malacostraca
- Order: Decapoda
- Suborder: Pleocyemata
- Family: Parastacidae
- Genus: Gramastacus; Riek, 1972

Species
- Gramastacus insolitus Riek, 1972; Gramastacus lacus McCormack, 2014

= Gramastacus =

Genus of crayfishes

Gramastacus is a genus of freshwater crayfish species from southeast Australia. It has two described species.

== Discovery ==
Two species of Gramastacus were originally described in 1972 by Edgar Riek from the Grampian region of western Victoria, Australia: Gramastacus insolitus and Gramastacus gracilis. In 1990, G. gracilis was determined to be a junior synonym of G. insolitus. In 2014, a new species Gramastacus lacus from the coastal regions of New South Wales was formally described by McCormack.

== Species ==
- Western Swamp Crayfish - Gramastacus insolitus Riek, 1972 (western Victoria, Australia) - a very small non-burrowing crayfish that shares burrows with larger crayfish species
- Eastern Swamp Crayfish - Gramastacus lacus McCormack, 2014 (coastal regions of New South Wales, Australia) - a larger, more robust crayfish species that digs their own burrows
