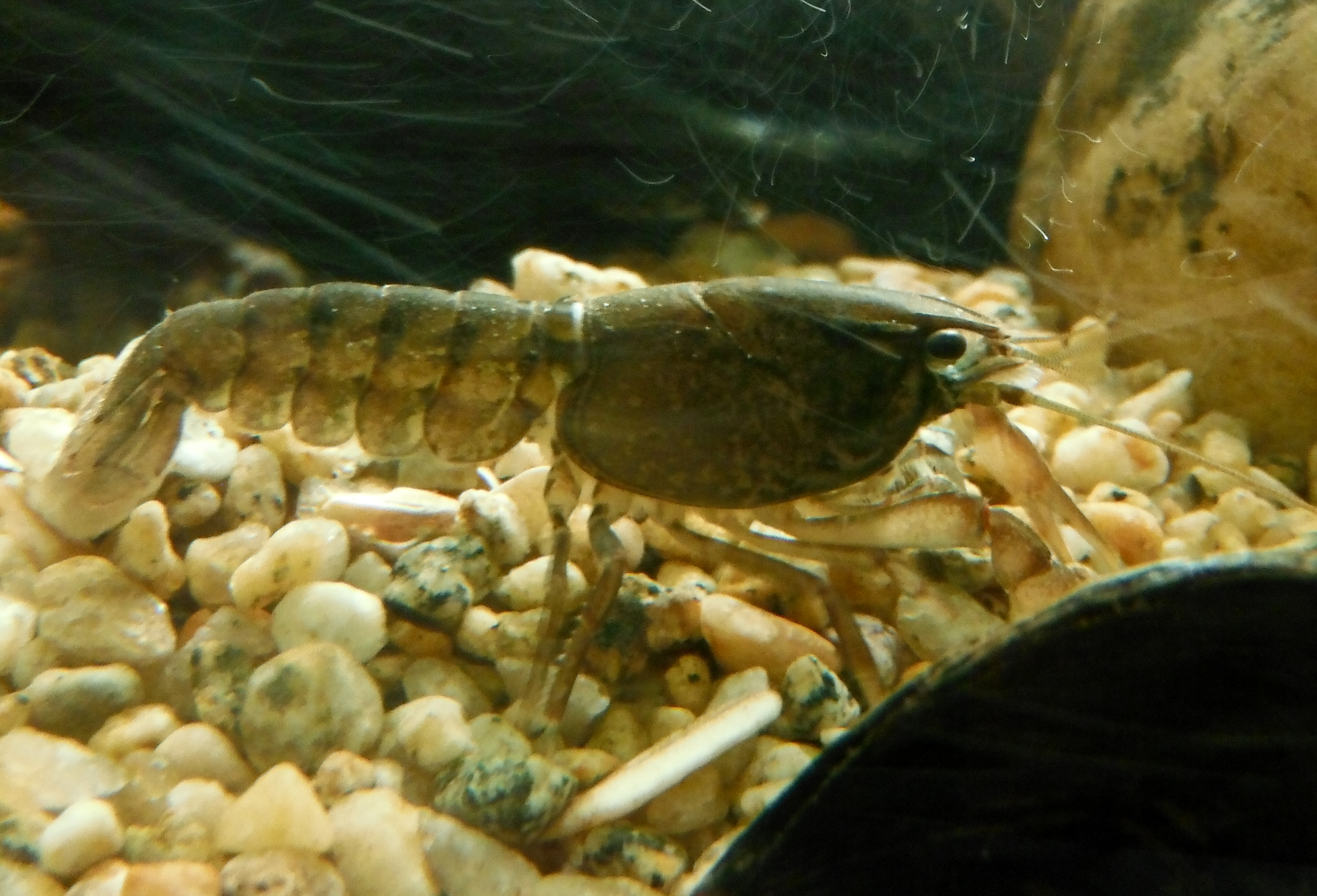
- Samastacus spinifrons

Conservation status
- Data Deficient (IUCN 3.1)

Scientific classification
- Kingdom: Animalia
- Phylum: Arthropoda
- Class: Malacostraca
- Order: Decapoda
- Suborder: Pleocyemata
- Infraorder: Astacidea
- Superfamily: Parastacoidea
- Family: Parastacidae
- Genus: Samastacus; Riek, 1971
- Species: S. spinifrons

Binomial name
- Samastacus spinifrons (Philippi, 1882)
- Distribution map of the Samastacus crayfish species

Synonyms
- Astacus spinifrons Philippi, 1882; Astacus bimaculatus Philippi, 1894; Parastacus agassizii Faxon, 1898; Parastacus spinifrons

= Samastacus =

Genus of crustaceans

Samastacus is a genus of southern crayfish in the family Parastacidae. It has a single species, Samastacus spinifrons.

This species is found in Chile, in the region of Talcahuano, south towards the Taitao Peninsula and the Island of Chiloé. It occurs in the rivers and streams of Maipo River basin to the north, and can be found in most of the Aconcagua River and tributaries. In addition, it is found in Lake Nahuel-Huapi, Argentina. It digs shallow burrows in tranquil water along river banks and lakes.
