= Palaeoechinastacus =

Palaeoechinastacus Temporal range: (Aptian? – ) Albian

Scientific classification
- Kingdom: Animalia
- Phylum: Arthropoda
- Class: Malacostraca
- Order: Decapoda
- Suborder: Pleocyemata
- Family: Parastacidae
- Genus: †Palaeoechinastacus; Martin et al., 2008
- Species: †P. australianus

Binomial name
- †Palaeoechinastacus australianus Martin et al., 2008

Genus of crayfishes

Palaeoechinastacus australianus is a species of freshwater crayfish known from Early Cretaceous fossils from Victoria, Australia.

== Specimens and stratigraphy ==
Palaeoechinastacus is known from one partial body fossil, which is the holotype, and has been deposited in the National Museum of Victoria in Melbourne as lot number NMV-P186041. Two specimens, each showing a single chela (claw) were deposited as lots NMV-P186042 and NMV-P186009, but are not part of the type series, and are therefore considered to be "hypotypes". The body fossils were collected in 1987 and 1989, but it is not known exactly who found them. In addition, a number of trace fossils of burrow-like structures were found in a similar geological setting, and may be related to Palaeoechinastacus.

=== Holotype ===
The holotype was collected at Dinosaur Cove on the Victoria coast from "a fine-grained lithic sandstone" of the Otway Group. The rocks are thought to have formed from a river channel, and date from the Albian age of the Cretaceous period. Despite some damage from a rock saw, the specimen comprises most of an abdomen, including the telson and one uropod, and parts of four pereiopods. The somites of the abdomen overlap, and bear a few small spines. The entire abdomen is about 83 millimetres (3.3 in) long, including the telson, implying a total length of around 170 mm (6.7 in).

=== Hypotypes ===
Two disjointed claws were collected from the same horizon as the holotype. It is not clear that they came from the same animal as the holotype. The two isolated chelae also differ from each other, although this could be due to sexual dimorphism or ontogenetic differences rather than differences between species.

=== Trace fossils ===
Trace fossils resembling those made by crayfish were found near Marengo in sandstones of Aptian age. Similar trace fossils from freshwater environments have previously been linked specifically to crayfish, and other potential creators, such as lungfish, are not considered likely in this case, because of the form of the burrows.

== Ecology ==
A the time Palaeoechinastacus was alive, the Otway and Gippsland basins of Australia were at high latitudes. On the basis of palaeobotany and geochemistry, the annual mean air temperature would have been in the range −6–5 °C (21–41 °F).

== Significance ==
Palaeoechinastacus is the earliest body fossil from the family Parastacidae, and the earliest crayfish from Gondwana. The only earlier pieces of evidence of crayfish in the southern hemisphere are the trace fossils from Marengo, and some trace fossils from Argentina, dating from the Late Jurassic to the Late Cretaceous. This accords with the modern distribution of crayfish, which are most abundant in temperate regions, and live in the tropics chiefly in cooler, montane environments.
