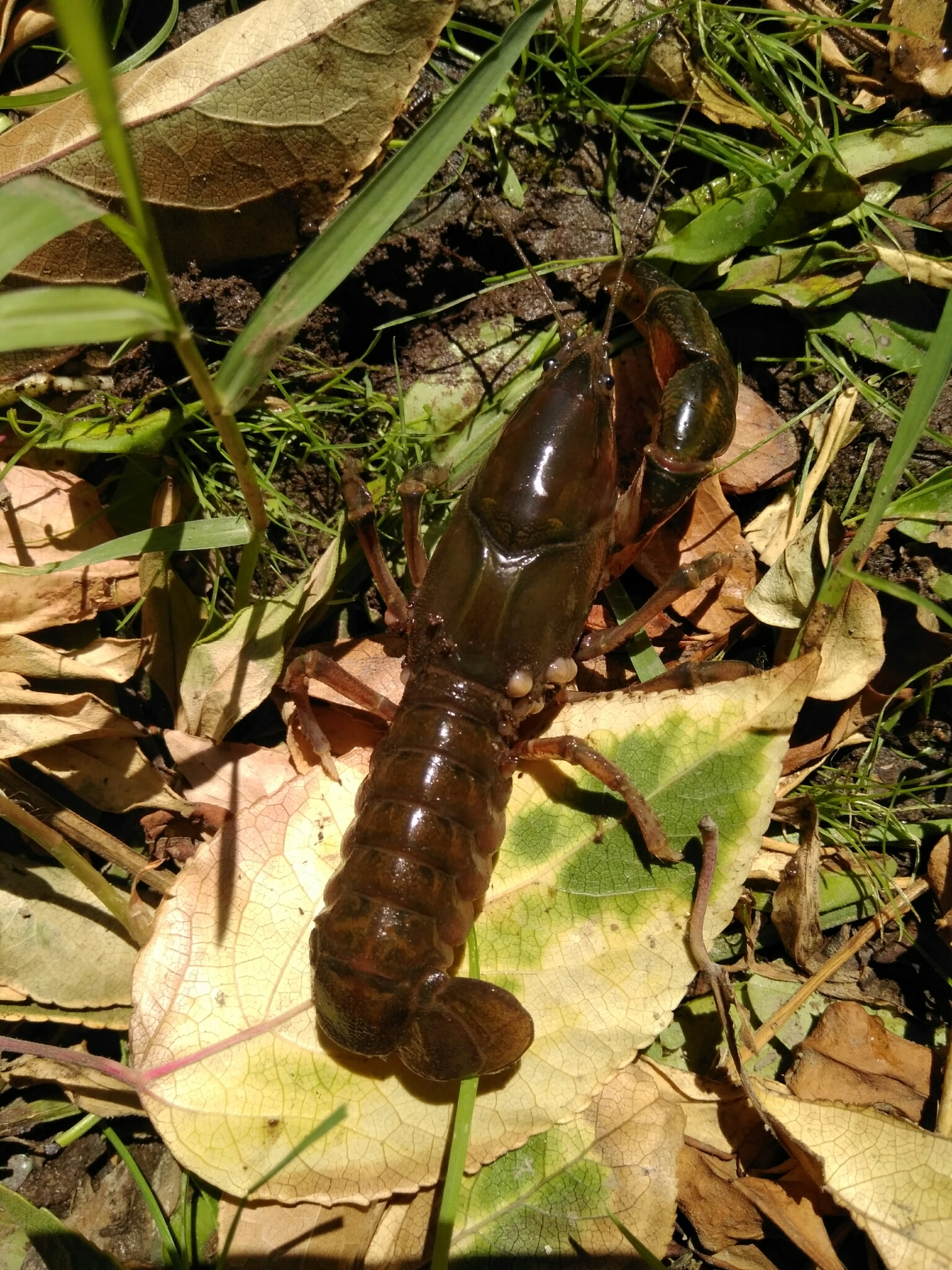
- Parastacus pugnax, Chile

Scientific classification
- Domain: Eukaryota
- Kingdom: Animalia
- Phylum: Arthropoda
- Class: Malacostraca
- Order: Decapoda
- Suborder: Pleocyemata
- Family: Parastacidae
- Genus: Parastacus; Huxley, 1879

= Parastacus =

Genus of crustaceans

Parastacus is a genus of southern crawfish in the family Parastacidae. There are about 15 described species in Parastacus, found in South America. In addition, there are some preserved specimens from Australia that are possibly members of this genus.

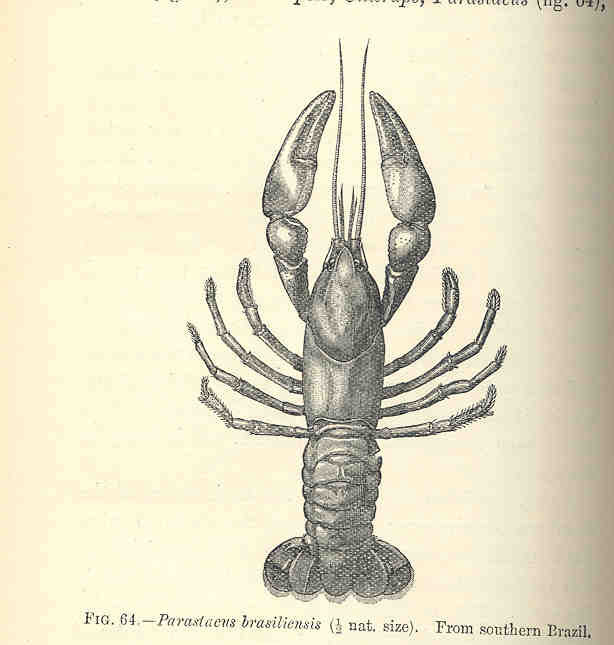
Parastacus brasiliensis, Brazil

== Species ==
These 15 species belong to the genus Parastacus:

- Parastacus brasiliensis (von Martens, 1869)
- Parastacus buckupi Huber, Ribeiro & Araujo, 2018
- Parastacus caeruleodactylus Ribeiro & Araujo, 2016 (blue-fingered burrowing crayfish)
- Parastacus defossus Faxon, 1898
- Parastacus fluviatilis Ribeiro & Buckup, 2016 (highland streams crayfish)
- Parastacus laevigatus Buckup & Rossi, 1980
- Parastacus macanudo Huber, Rockhill, Araujo & Ribeiro, 2020
- Parastacus nicoleti (Philippi, 1882)
- Parastacus pilicarpus Huber, Ribeiro & Araujo, 2018
- Parastacus pilimanus (von Martens, 1869)
- Parastacus promatensis Fontoura & Conter, 2008
- Parastacus pugnax (Poeppig, 1835)
- Parastacus saffordi Faxon, 1898
- Parastacus tuerkayi Ribeiro, Huber & Araujo, 2017
- Parastacus varicosus Faxon, 1898
