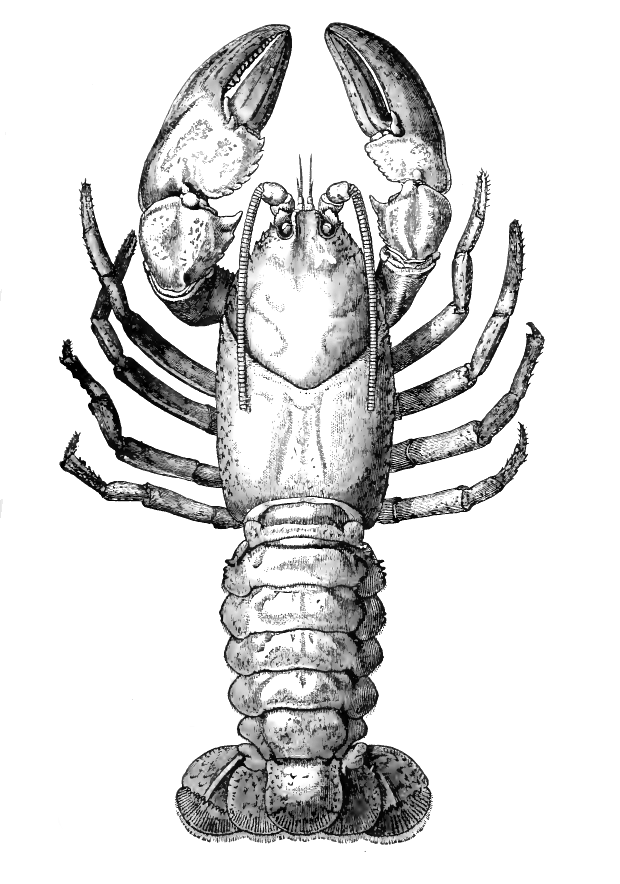

Scientific classification
- Kingdom: Animalia
- Phylum: Arthropoda
- Class: Malacostraca
- Order: Decapoda
- Suborder: Pleocyemata
- Family: Parastacidae
- Genus: Astacoides; Guérin-Méneville, 1839

Type species
- Astacus Goudotii Bate, 1865

= Astacoides =

Genus of crayfishes

Astacoides is a genus of freshwater crayfish endemic to Madagascar. The first specimens were brought to Europe in 1839, and seven species are now recognised, most of which are considered as threatened on the IUCN Red List. They are large and slow-growing, and are threatened by habitat loss, overexploitation by local people and by spread of introduced non-indigenous marbled crayfish (Procambarus virginalis). They are only found in a relatively small part of the island, mostly in undisturbed upland areas. They belong to the Gondwana-distributed family Parastacidae, but their nearest relatives live in Australasia, there being no native crayfish in mainland Africa or India.

== Description ==
Astacoides species are large for freshwater crayfish, reaching a carapace length of up to 80 millimetres (3.1 in) in the case of A. betsileoensis. Males and females are similar, except for the organs directly involved in reproduction. Thomas Henry Huxley, in his book The Crayfish, noted that Astacoides has fewer pairs of gills than any other crayfish, with only 12 pairs compared to 21 pairs in Astacopsis.

== Biology ==
Very little field work has been carried out on Malagasy crayfish, leaving their biology poorly known. They are slow-growing animals, among the slowest of any crayfish; A. crosnieri may take 10 years to reach a carapace length of 30 mm (1.2 in). They appear to breed once a year, with females bearing eggs for around four months, peaking from July to October. The eggs hatch in October or November, and the juveniles are independent by January.

The fish Channa maculata is an invasive species in parts of Madagascar, and it is known to feed on young crayfish. Astacoides is also harvested by local people, often before the crayfish are able to reach reproductive age. The greater threat to Astacoides crayfish, however, is from habitat loss. The importance of habitat loss may have been underestimated in the past because most studies have focussed on the Ranomafana National Park, where the forests are largely intact but crayfish are still harvested by local people. The introduced marbled crayfish may also be a significant threat, both by outcompeting native crayfish and spreading the devastating crayfish plague to them, although crayfish plague-induced declines have not been noted among native Astacoides in places where they co-occur with marbled crayfish.

== Distribution ==
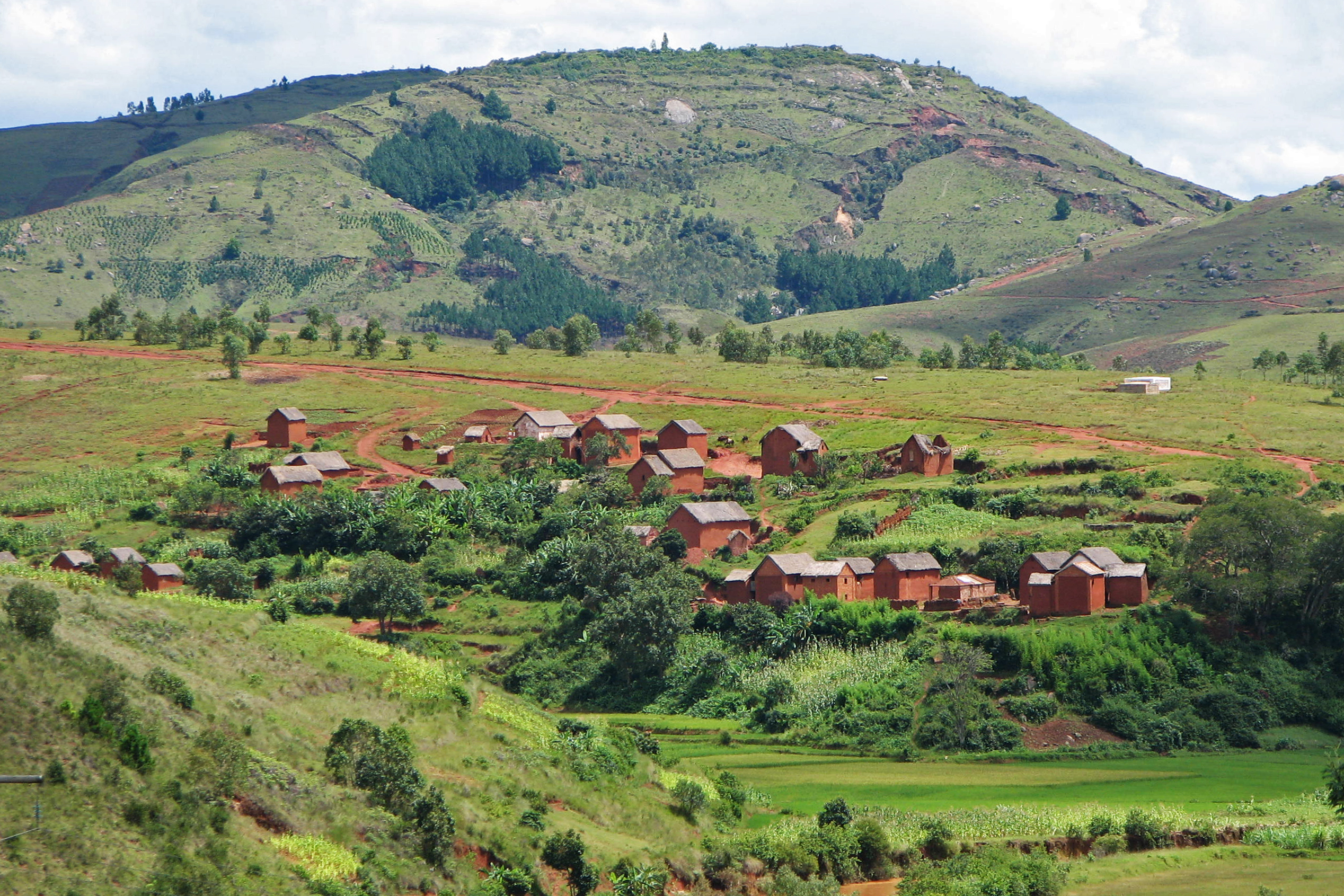
A village in the Malagasy highlands

Crayfish are only found in a relatively small area of Madagascar, covering parts of Toamasina, Antananarivo, Fianarantsoa and Toliara provinces; the total area they inhabit is around 60,000 square kilometres (23,000 sq mi) and ranges from the Isaha valley south to the Hauts Plateaux (near Anjozorobe). In common with other tropical crayfish, Astacoides only lives at higher altitudes, from 500 metres (1,600 ft) above sea level to 2,000 m (6,600 ft).

== Biogeography ==
The presence of Astacoides on the island of Madagascar is difficult to explain. The other members of the family Parastacidae are found in South America and Australasia, suggesting a Gondwanan origin for the family. However, there are no native crayfish in either Africa or India, the two landmasses with the most recent connections to Madagascar in the geological past. The genus which shares the greatest similarities with Astacoides is the Tasmanian genus Astacopsis. Given the large distance between Tasmania and Madagascar, it has been suggested that although the freshwater crayfish are a monophyletic group, their common ancestor may have lived in the seas, with separate crayfish lineages colonising the rivers separately.

== Taxonomic history ==
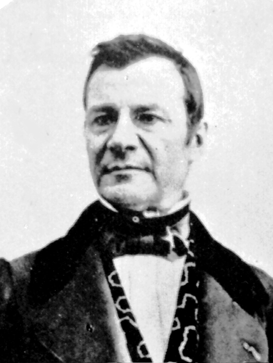
Félix Édouard Guérin-Méneville, who was the first to describe a crayfish from Madagascar

In 1839, the French explorer-naturalist Justin Goudot returned from an expedition to Madagascar bearing specimens of a crayfish he had collected there. He gave some of the material to the Muséum national d'histoire naturelle in Paris and some to Félix Édouard Guérin-Méneville. Both Guérin-Méneville and, at the museum, Henri Milne-Edwards and Jean Victoire Audouin wrote papers describing the new species, with the name Astacoides Goudotii Guérin, 1839 published on 29 April, and Astacus madagascarensis Milne-Edwards & Audouin, 1839 published on May 9. Some years later, and apparently unaware of the two French descriptions, Charles Spence Bate published what he thought was the first account of Malagasy crayfish. He had been brought specimens by J. Caldwell, and described them in 1865 under the name Astacus Caldwelli Bate, 1865. By the end of the 19th century, scientists had settled on the name Astacus madagascarensis, treating the others as synonyms, and to preserve nomenclatural stability, the name A. goudotii was suppressed by the International Commission on Zoological Nomenclature in 1958.

The next new taxon to be described was the variety betsileoensis described by Georges Petit in 1923. In 1927, he divided the Malagasy crayfish into the "macrophthalmes", with large eyes, a convex carapace and flattened chelae, and the "microphthalmes", with small eyes, cylindrical carapace and more robust chelae. In their 1929 monograph, Théodore Monod and Petit recognised four "varieties", betsileoensis and madagascariensis (the "macrophthalmes") and brevirostris and granulimanus (the "microphthalmes"). In 1964, Lipke Holthuis realised that due to the suppression of the name goudotii, the epithet caldwelli would have to be used, although Holthuis continued to treat the different taxa as subspecies. In 1974, Horton H. Hobbs Jr. published a monograph which finally raised the various taxa observed to that point to the rank of species, and introduced two new species. Since then, the only change has been the addition of a new species, described in 2005, and commemorating Hobbs, Astacoides hobbsi.

== Taxonomy ==
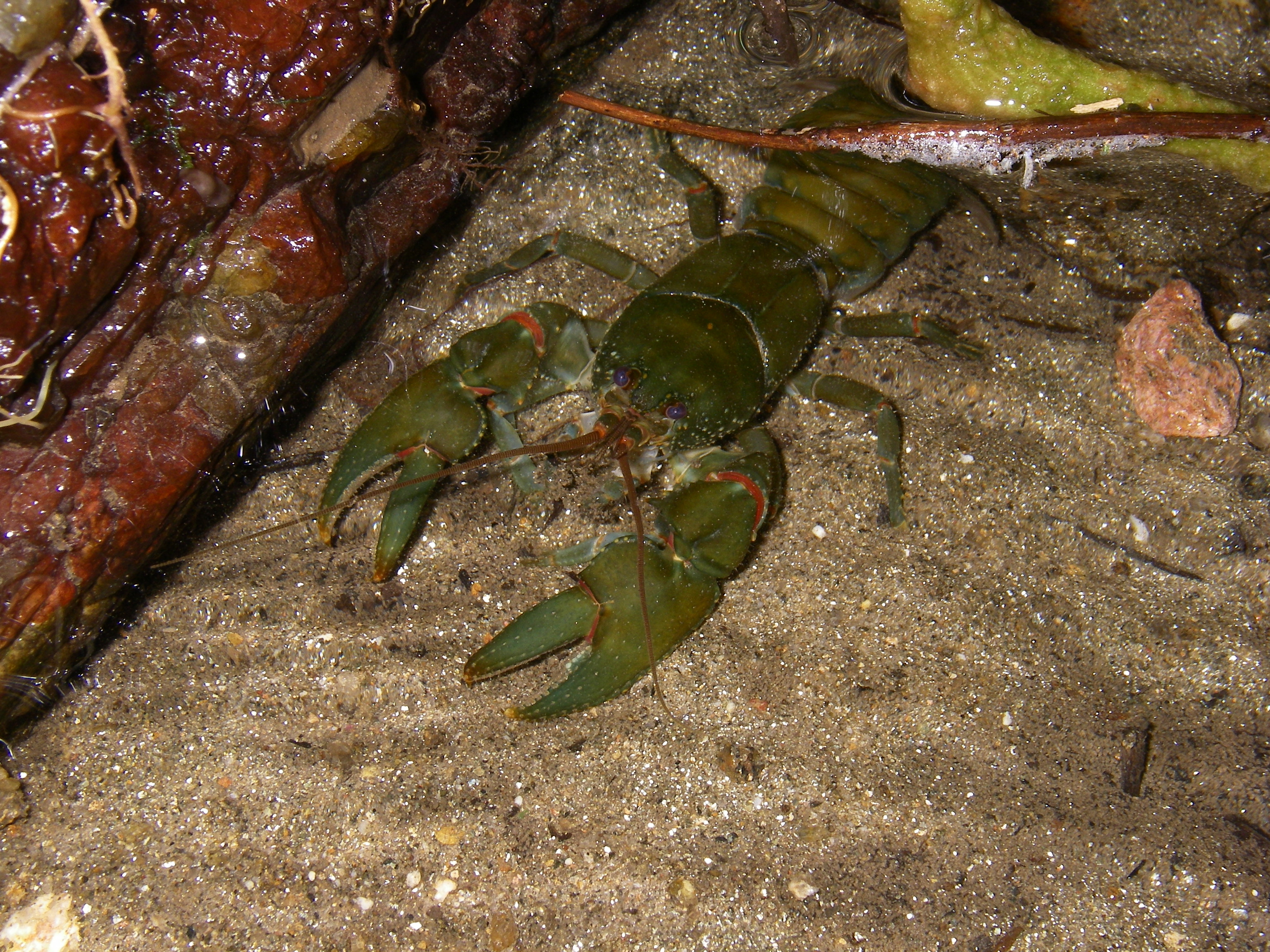
Astacoides betsileoensis, seen in the Ranomafana National Park

Of the seven described species, four are considered vulnerable species (VU), one is "Data Deficient" (DD), and two are of "Least Concern" (LC).

- Astacoides betsileoensis Petit, 1923 –
- Astacoides caldwelli (Bate, 1865) –
- Astacoides crosnieri Hobbs, 1987 –
- Astacoides granulimanus Monod & Petit, 1929 –
- Astacoides hobbsi Boyko, 2005 –
- Astacoides madagascarensis (H. Milne-Edwards & Audouin, 1839) –
- Astacoides petiti Hobbs, 1987 –
