= Keith A. Crandall =

American geneticist

- Education: Kalamazoo College (1987); Washington University in St. Louis (1992)
- Awards: American Society of Naturalists' Young Investigator Prize 1994; Alfred P. Sloan Young Investigator Award 1996; NSF CAREER Award 1997-2002; Fulbright Scholar Oxford University 2000-2001; Batts Foundation Natural History Lecturer, Kalamazoo College 2003; President, Society of Systematic Biologists 2010; Honors Professor of the Year, Brigham Young University 2012

Keith A. Crandall is an American computational biologist, bioinformaticist, and population geneticist at George Washington University, where he is the founding director of the Computational Biology Institute, and professor in the Department of Biostatistics and Bioinformatics.

== Education ==
Crandall received a Bachelor of Arts degree in mathematics and biology from Kalamazoo College in 1987. He received a Master of Arts degree in coalescent theory and network estimation of gene genealogies (statistics) from Washington University in St. Louis in 1992. He then proceeded to obtain a Doctor of Philosophy in biology and biomedical sciences from Washington University in St. Louis in 1993, for research supervised by Alan Templeton on the molecular systematics and evolutionary biology in the crayfish subgenus Procericambarus (Decapoda: Cambaridae). Crandall then held the Alfred P. Sloan and National Science Foundation Postdoctoral Fellowships at the University of Texas, studying molecular evolution under advisors Jim Bull and David Hillis, between 1993 and 1996.

== Career and research ==
In 1996, Crandall joined the faculty of the Department of Zoology at Brigham Young University as an assistant professor, where he served until 2002. He then joined the Departments of Integrative Biology and Microbiology and Molecular Biology at Brigham Young University as an associate professor, and then as a full professor from 2005 to 2006. Crandall was then appointed chair of the Department of Integrative Biology from 2006 to 2007, and later served as chair of the Department of Biology from 2007 to 2012. In 2010, Crandall was listed as an ISI highly cited researcher.

In 2012, Crandall was recruited by George Washington University to found the Computational Biology Institute, where he has since served as its founding director, additionally holding appointments as a professor in the Department of Biological Sciences from 2012 to 2017, a professor in the Department of Epidemiology and Biostatistics from 2018 to 2019, and in the Department of Biostatistics and Bioinformatics since 2019. Crandall also serves as the director of the George Washington University Milken Institute School of Public Health Genomics Core Facility, co-director of the Informatics Core of the Clinical and Translational Science Institute at Children's National Health System, and co-director of The George Washington University Institute for Biomedical Sciences PhD Program in Genomics and Bioinformatics.

Crandall studies the computational biology, population genetics, and bioinformatics of a variety of organisms, from crustaceans to agents of infectious diseases. His lab also focuses on the development and testing of methods for DNA sequence analysis, including leading methods in phylogenetics and microbiome research. He applies these methods and others to the study of the evolution of infectious diseases with particular focus on HIV evolution. He is also a leading authority in crustacean evolutionary biology. Crandall has published over 300 peer-reviewed publications, as well as three books (The Evolution of HIV, Algorithms in Bioinformatics, and Decapod Crustacean Phylogenetics). Crandall's research has been funded by both the National Science Foundation and the National Institutes of Health as well as from a variety of other agencies, including American Foundation for AIDS Research, National Geographic, United States Forest Service, Pharmaceutical Research and Manufacturers of America, Alfred P. Sloan Foundation, etc.

== Awards and honors ==
- American Society of Naturalists' Young Investigator Prize - 1994
- Alfred P. Sloan Young Investigator Award - 1996
- NSF CAREER Award - 1997-2002
- Fulbright Scholar Oxford University - 2000-2001
- Batts Foundation Natural History Lecturer, Kalamazoo College - 2003
- PhRMA Foundation Sabbatical Fellowship in Informatics - 2005-2006
- President, Society of Systematic Biologists - 2010
- Honors Professor of the Year, Brigham Young University - 2012
- Elected Fellow, American Association for the Advancement of Science - 2013
- Faculty Member, Faculty of 1000—Bioinformatics - 2016
- Elected Fellow, Linnean Society of London - 2017
