= Tenuibranchiurus =

Conservation status
- Endangered (IUCN 3.1)

Scientific classification
- Kingdom: Animalia
- Phylum: Arthropoda
- Clade: Pancrustacea
- Class: Malacostraca
- Order: Decapoda
- Suborder: Pleocyemata
- Family: Parastacidae
- Genus: Tenuibranchiurus; Riek, 1951
- Species: T. glypticus

Binomial name
- Tenuibranchiurus glypticus Riek, 1951

Genus of crayfishes

Tenuibranchiurus is a genus of diminutive freshwater crayfish that live in the Australian state of Queensland. Only one species has been described, the swamp crayfish, T. glypticus.

Tenuibranchiurus glypticus is reportedly the smallest species of crayfish in the world. It is distinguished from other crayfish by its small size, adults being only around 25 millimetres (1.0 in) long, and its claws which open vertically rather than horizontally or obliquely.

Tenuibranchiurus lives in coastal wallum swamps, and stays among the sedges rather than in more open water. Its habitat is highly fragmented, as land is used for the expansion of Brisbane and the Sunshine Coast, and Tenuibranchiurus glypticus is therefore listed as an endangered species on the IUCN Red List. Additional populations have been found at the periphery of its range, but these are thought to represent new, undescribed species.

== See also ==
- Tasmanian giant freshwater crayfish - world's largest freshwater crayfish, also found in Australia
