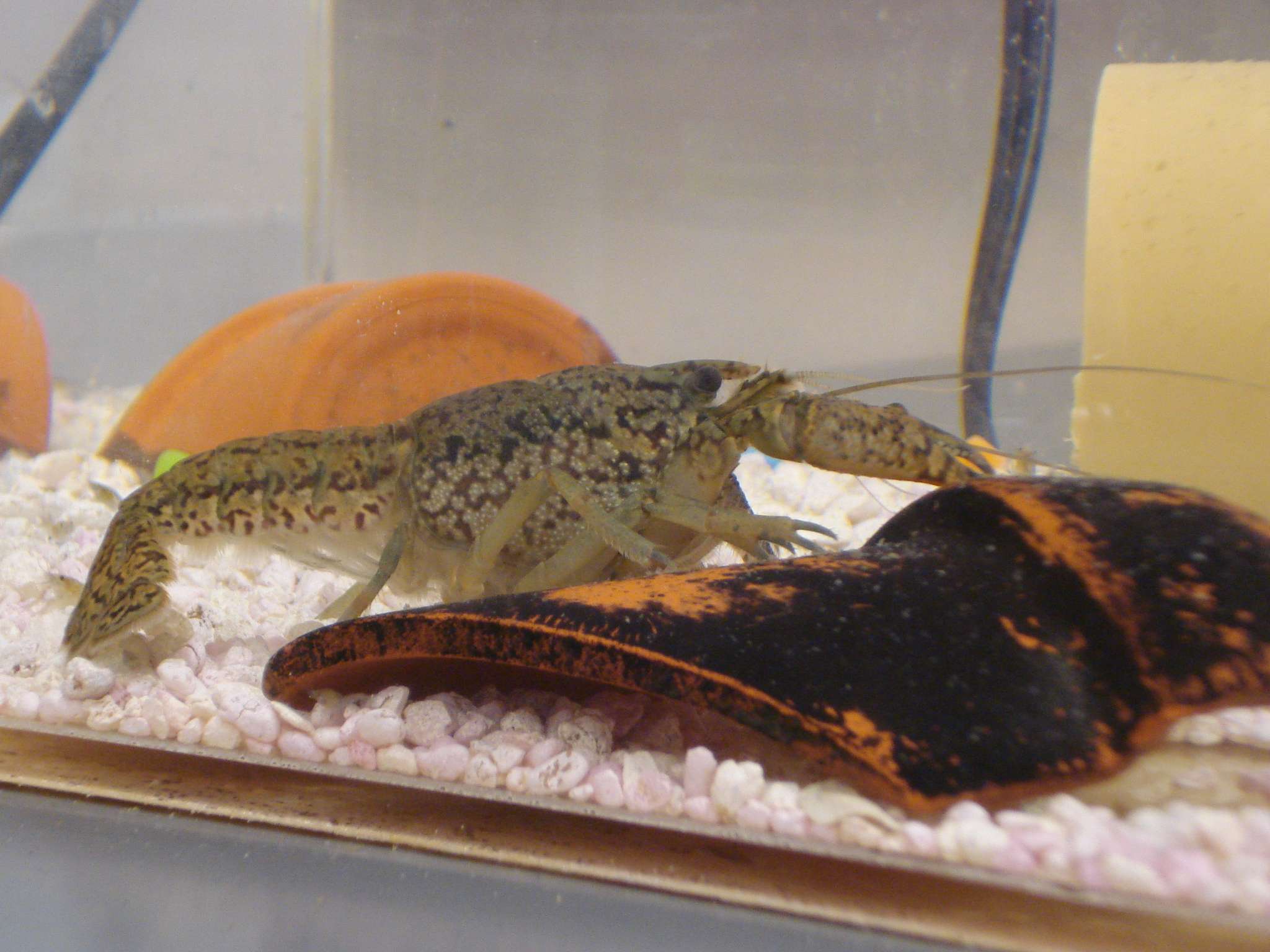
- Adult marbled crayfish

Scientific classification
- Kingdom: Animalia
- Phylum: Arthropoda
- Clade: Pancrustacea
- Class: Malacostraca
- Order: Decapoda
- Suborder: Pleocyemata
- Family: Cambaridae
- Genus: Procambarus
- Species: P. virginalis

Binomial name
- Procambarus virginalis Lyko, 2017
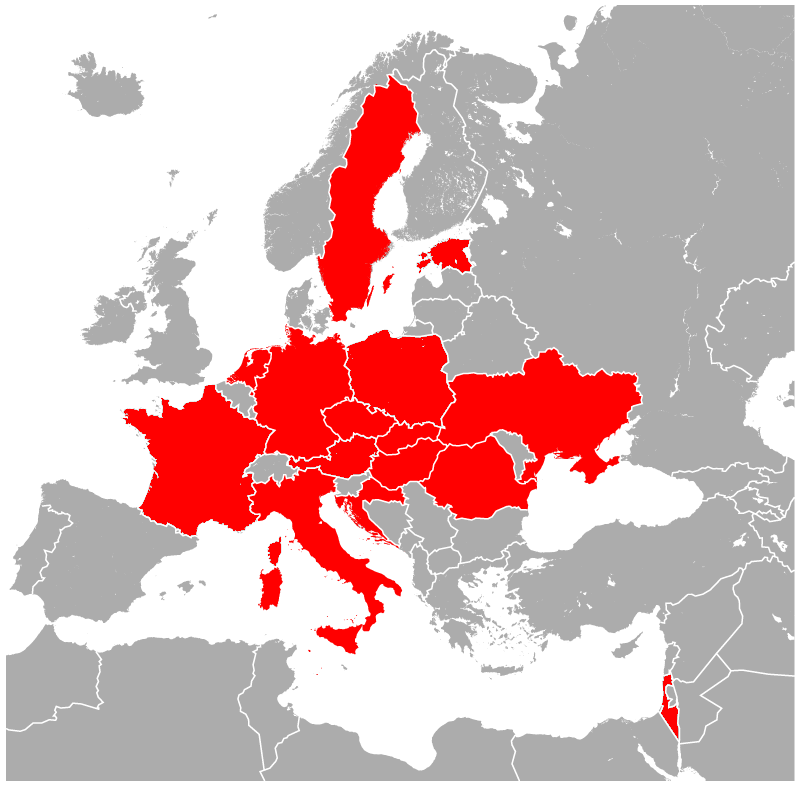
- Countries where the marbled crayfish has been found in the wild. It has also been found in Belgium, Canada, Denmark, Japan, Madagascar, South Korea, Taiwan, and China.

Synonyms
- Procambarus fallax forma virginalis Martin, Dorn, Kawai, van der Heiden & Scholtz, 2010

= Marbled crayfish =

Marbled crayfish Temporal range: 1988 – present

Species of crayfish

The marbled crayfish or Marmorkrebs (Procambarus virginalis) is a parthenogenetic crayfish that was discovered in the pet trade in Germany in 1995. Marbled crayfish are closely related to the "slough crayfish", Procambarus fallax, which is widely distributed across Florida. No natural populations of marbled crayfish are known. Information provided by one of the original pet traders as to where the marbled crayfish originated was deemed "totally confusing and unreliable". The informal name Marmorkrebs is German for "marbled crayfish".

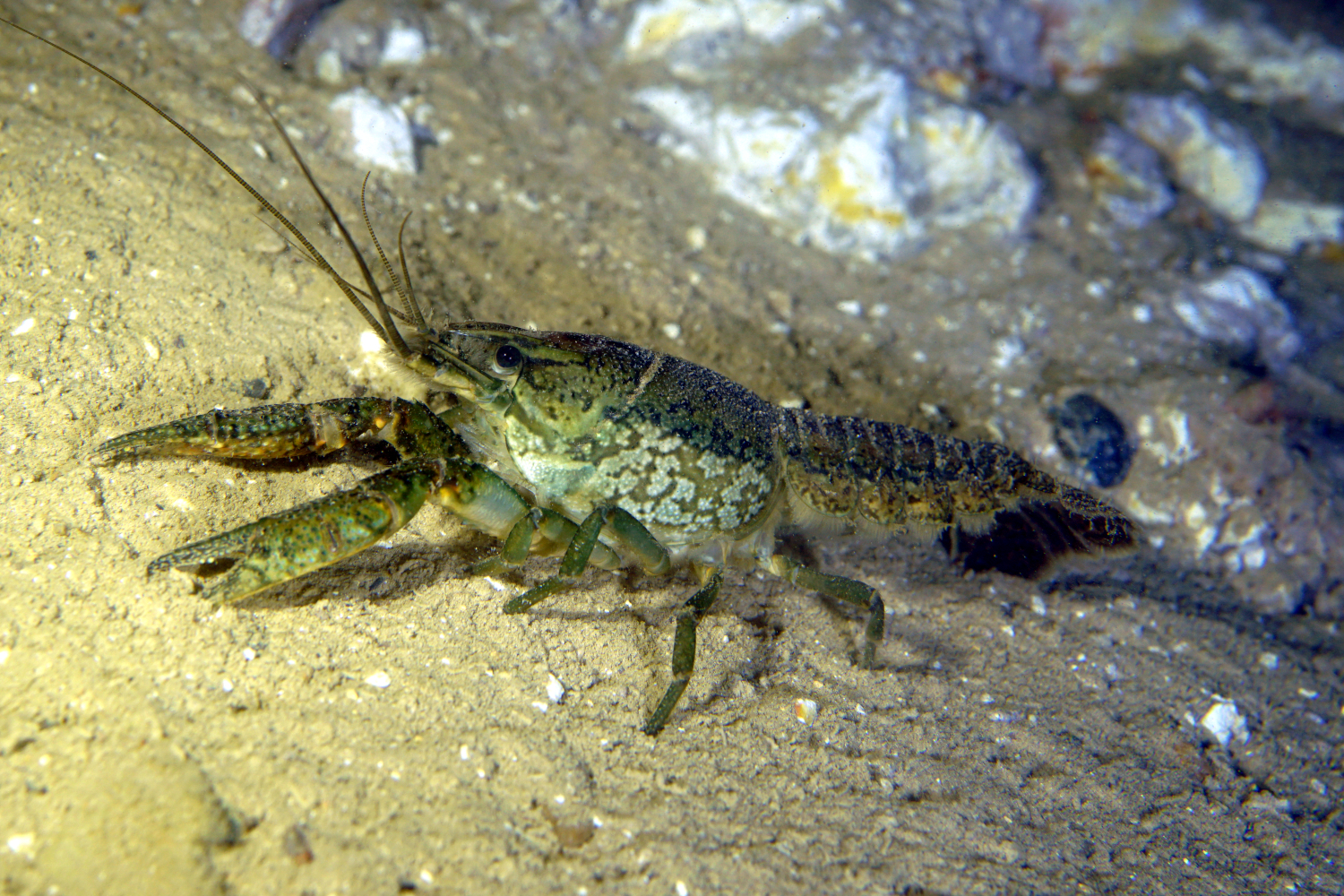
Marbled crayfish

== Model organism ==
Marbled crayfish were the first known decapod crustaceans to reproduce by parthenogenesis. All individuals are female, and the offspring are genetically identical to the parent. Marbled crayfish are triploid animals with 276 chromosomes, which may be the main reason for their parthenogenetic reproduction. It is hypothesized that marbled crayfish originated from an error in meiosis resulting in a diploid gamete, which was then fertilized and created a viable triploid individual in a single generation. Marbled crayfish are thus a model for the rapid generation of species. Unlike other parthenogenetic organisms, the marbled crayfish is an extremely young species; all marbled crayfish are likely the clonal descendants of a single specimen from approximately 1988.

Because marbled crayfish are genetically identical, easy to care for, and reproduce at high rates, they are a potential model organism, particularly for studying development. A major drawback, however, is the long generation time (several months) compared to other research organisms.

The marbled crayfish genome was sequenced in 2018, which provides an essential foundation for further research.

== Invasive species ==
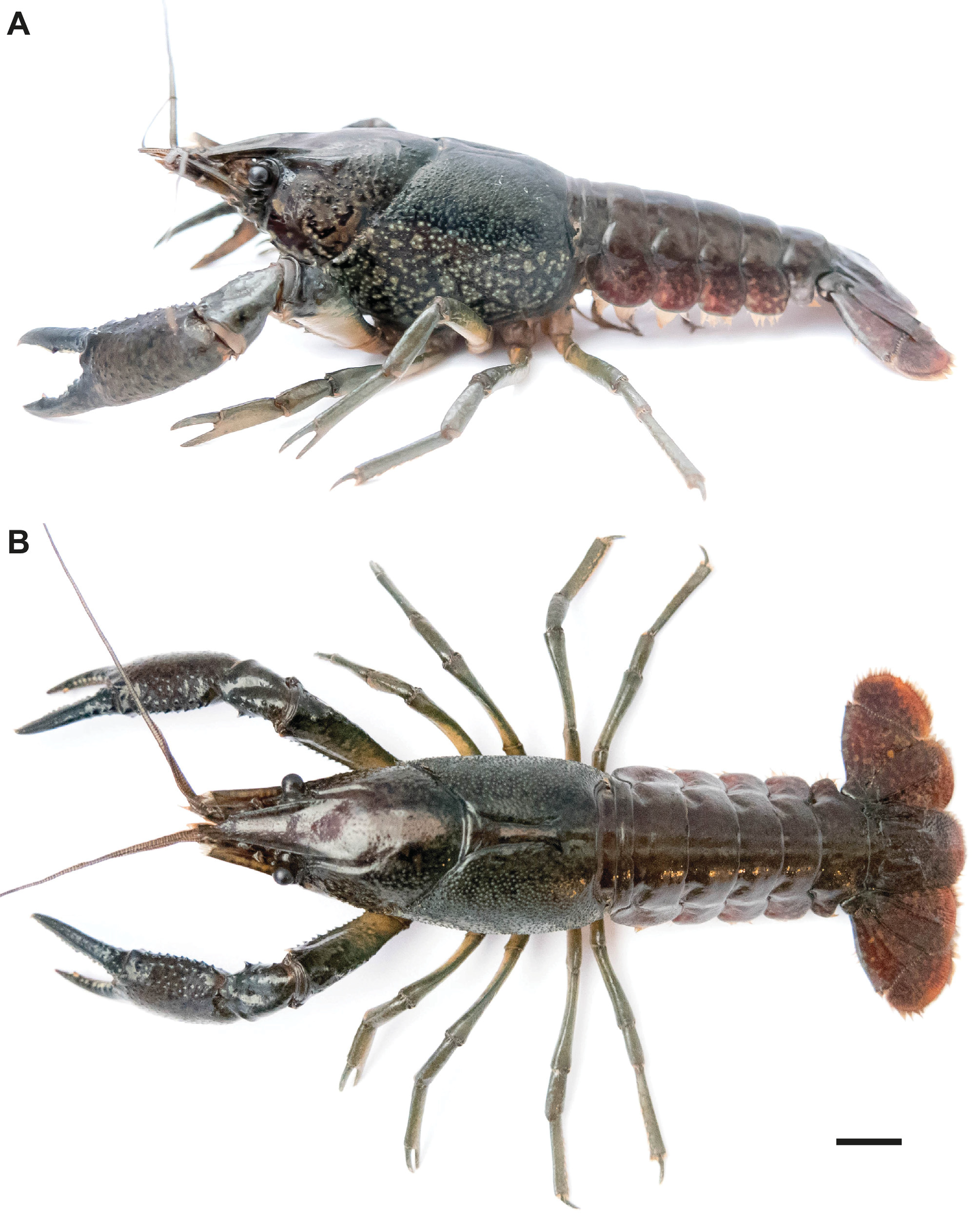
Procambarus virginalis new species holotype (A) lateral and (B) dorsal views

Marbled crayfish have caused concern as a potential invasive species because only a single individual is needed to establish a new population, and they can reproduce at high rates. Marbled crayfish are also a known carrier of a crayfish plague pathogen, Aphanomyces astaci. Marbled crayfish inhabit freshwater environments, and have not successfully invaded ecosystems with higher salinity levels due to their reduced ability to reproduce and grow. However, it has been proven that they can adjust to increasing saline environments, which may allow for their further expansion.

They have since been introduced into natural ecosystems on five continents. They have been found in the wild in the following countries:

- Austria
- Belgium
- Canada
- China
- Croatia
- Czech Republic
- Denmark
- Estonia
- France
- Germany
- Hungary
- Israel
- Italy
- Japan
- Madagascar
- Malta
- Netherlands
- Poland
- Romania
- Slovakia
- South Korea
- Sweden
- Taiwan
- Ukraine

While initial reports of marbled crayfish in the wild in Europe consisted of only single individuals, the number of European countries reporting populations of marbled crayfish is rising.

In Europe, the marbled crayfish is included since 2016 in the List of invasive alien species of Union concern. This implies that this species cannot be imported, bred, transported, commercialized, or intentionally released into the environment in the whole of the European Union.

The Madagascar population has grown rapidly and is estimated to be in the millions, with their geographical distribution having increased 100-fold from 2007 to 2017, causing concern among local authorities.

== Regulation ==
Marbled crayfish are one of the most widely distributed species of crayfish in the international pet trade and release from aquariums has likely been the main source of unwanted introductions. Concerns about the potential damage from their introduction have prompted several jurisdictions to regulate ownership of marbled crayfish.

The European Union instituted "a total ban on the possession, trade, transport, production and release of these species [including the marbled crayfish] in the wild" in 2016.

Japan banned most North American crayfish species, including marbled crayfish, in 2020.

Marbled crayfish are prohibited in the American states of Idaho, Missouri, Tennessee, Michigan, and Maryland, and in the Canadian provinces of Saskatchewan and Ontario.

== As food ==
Marbled crayfish are eaten in Madagascar. Human interest in consuming them may contribute to their spread.

Protein isolates from whole-body homogenate (including chitinous exoskeleton) of Procambarus virginalis are hypothesized to be dense in branched-chain amino acids (BCAA) and leucine (Leu) and are therefore potentially useful in biomedical research or as additives in supplements for BCAA and Leu. The mentioned crayfish species could offer 6.36–7.39 g Leu 100 g−1 dry matter (at 43–48% protein only). Crayfish whole-body protein isolates exhibit a Leu coefficient (18.41±2.51% of total amino acids) and a BCAA coefficient (28.76±2.39% of total amino acids), which is comparable to or higher than that of an industrial gold standard such as casein (Leu coefficient 8.65±0.08%; BCAA coefficient 20.03±0.73%).
