= Geocharax =

Scientific classification
- Kingdom: Animalia
- Phylum: Arthropoda
- Clade: Pancrustacea
- Class: Malacostraca
- Order: Decapoda
- Suborder: Pleocyemata
- Family: Parastacidae
- Genus: Geocharax; E. Clark, 1936

Species
- Geocharax falcata E. Clark, 1941; Geocharax tasmanicus (Erichson, 1846)
- Geocharax distribution is limited to a small area in the southeast of the Australia mainland and northwest Tasmania

Genus of crustaceans

Geocharax is a genus of crayfish in the family Parastacidae with two described species, both found in southeastern Australia.

- Geocharax falcata is endemic to the Northern Grampians in Victoria. This species can be found in the headwaters of the Glenelg River and also throughout the north of the Grampians National Park in southwest Victoria.
- Geocharax tasmanicus is endemic to both Victoria and Tasmania. Within Tasmania, this species is restricted to the far northwest, occurring between Rocky Cape and Temma on the Tasmanian mainland and also on the King Island and the Hunter Island Group. In Victoria, it is restricted to the Otway Region.

The IUCN conservation status of Geocharax falcata is "vulnerable" (VU). The species has a limited geographic range, and faces a high risk of endangerment in the medium term. The IUCN status of Geocharax tasmanicus is " least concern" (LC), with no immediate threat to survival. The IUCN status for both species was assessed in 2010.
