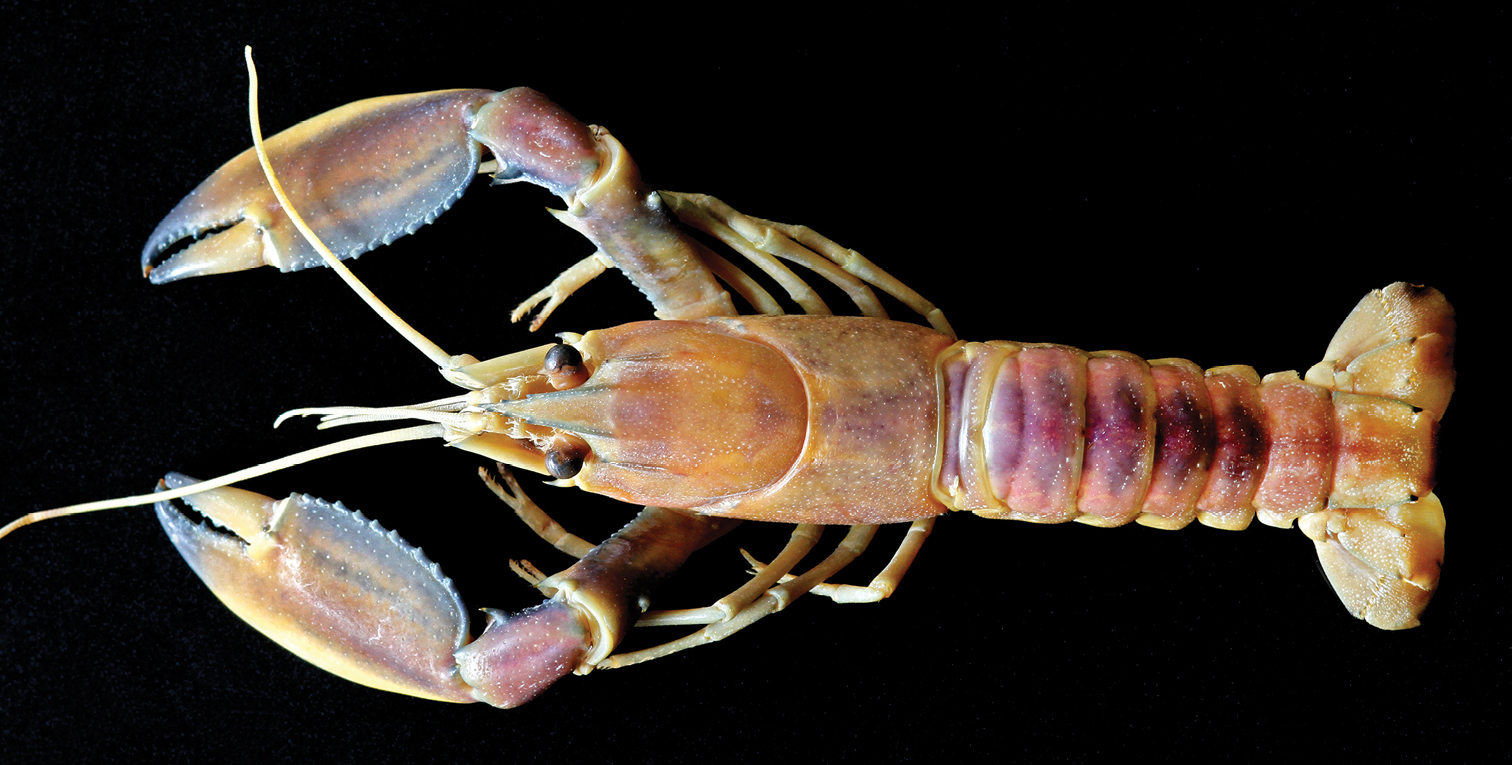
- Cherax pulcher

Scientific classification
- Kingdom: Animalia
- Phylum: Arthropoda
- Clade: Pancrustacea
- Class: Malacostraca
- Order: Decapoda
- Suborder: Pleocyemata
- Infraorder: Astacidea
- Superfamily: Parastacoidea; Huxley, 1879
- Family: Parastacidae; Huxley, 1879

Genera
- †Aenigmastacus; Astacoides; Astacopsis; Cherax; Engaeus; Engaewa; Euastacus; Geocharax; Gramastacus; Ombrastacoides; †Palaeoechinastacus; Paranephrops; Parastacus; Samastacus; Spinastacoides; Tenuibranchiurus; Virilastacus

= Parastacidae =

Parastacidae Temporal range: Albian–recent

Family of crustaceans

The Parastacidae are the family of freshwater crayfish found in the Southern Hemisphere. The family is a classic Gondwana-distributed taxon, with extant members in South America, Madagascar, Australia, New Zealand, and New Guinea, and extinct taxa also in Antarctica.

== Classification and phylogeny ==
Parastacidae belongs to the superfamily Parastacoidea, the monotypic taxon which contains all crayfish in the Southern Hemisphere. Parastacoidea is the sister taxon to Astacoidea, which contains all crayfish of the Northern Hemisphere. Crayfish and lobsters together comprise the infraorder Astacidea, as shown in the simplified cladogram below:

- Astacidea
  - clawed lobsters
    - Enoplometopoidea
      Enoplometopidae
    - Nephropoidea
      Nephropidae
  - crayfish
    - Parastacoidea
      Parastacidae
    - Astacoidea
      - Cambaroididae
      - - Astacidae
        - Cambaridae

== Distribution ==
The natural range of the family Parastacidae

Three genera are found in Chile, Virilastacus, Samastacus and Parastacus, the last of which also occurs disjunctly in southern Brazil and Uruguay.

There are no crayfish native to continental Africa, but seven species on Madagascar, all of the genus Astacoides.

Australasia is particularly rich in crayfish. The small genus Paranephrops is endemic to New Zealand. The genera Astacopsis is endemic to Tasmania, while a further two are found on either side of the Bass Strait – Geocharax and Engaeus. The greatest diversity, however, is found on the Australian mainland. Three genera are endemic and have restricted distributions (Engaewa, Gramastacus and Tenuibranchiurus), while two are more widespread and contain more than one hundred species between them: Euastacus, around the Australian coast from Melbourne to Brisbane, and Cherax across Australia and New Guinea. The Tasmanian genus Parastacoides was determined to be a synonym of Geocharax, and is no longer valid. However, the Parastacoides tasmanicus subspecies were not reassigned to Geocharax but placed in two new genera, Spinastacoides and Ombrastacoides.

== Fossil record ==
The oldest specimens from the family Parastacidae are the Albian fossils of Palaeoechinastacus from Victoria, Australia. The only northern hemisphere representative is also a fossil, Aenigmastacus crandalli from Canada.
