= Cambaroides koshewnikowi =

Scientific classification
- Domain: Eukaryota
- Kingdom: Animalia
- Phylum: Arthropoda
- Class: Malacostraca
- Order: Decapoda
- Suborder: Pleocyemata
- Family: Cambaroididae
- Genus: Cambaroides
- Species: C. koshewnikowi

Binomial name
- Cambaroides koshewnikowi Birstein & Vinogradov, 1934

Species of crayfish

Cambaroides koshewnikowi is a species of crayfish endemic to South Siberia.
