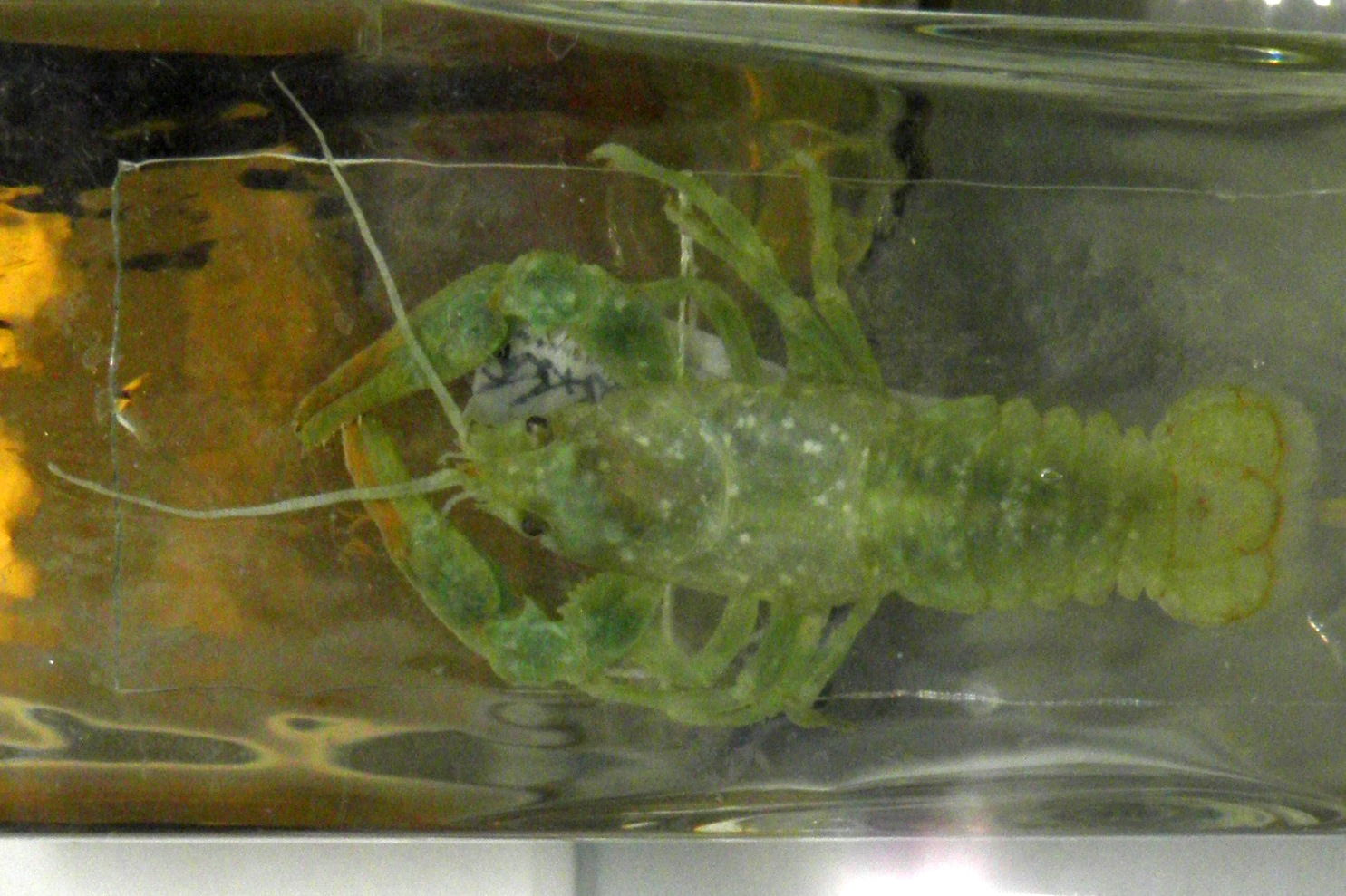

Conservation status
- Data Deficient (IUCN 3.1)

Scientific classification
- Kingdom: Animalia
- Phylum: Arthropoda
- Class: Malacostraca
- Order: Decapoda
- Suborder: Pleocyemata
- Family: Cambaroididae
- Genus: Cambaroides
- Species: C. dauricus

Binomial name
- Cambaroides dauricus (Pallas, 1773)

= Cambaroides dauricus =

Species of crayfish

Cambaroides dauricus is a species of crayfish endemic to north-eastern China, the Korean Peninsula and neighbouring parts of Russia.
