= Dietary biology of the brown bear =

Diet of brown bear

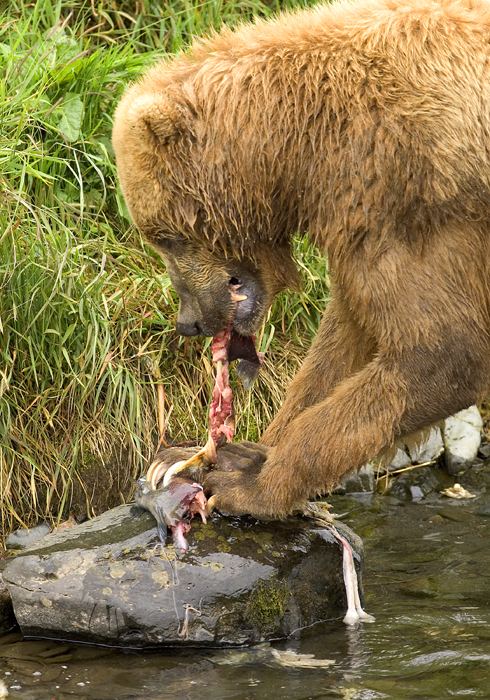
Brown bear feeding on salmon

The brown bear (Ursus arctos) is one of the most omnivorous animals in the world and has been recorded to consume the greatest variety of foods of any bear. Throughout life, this species is regularly curious about the potential of eating virtually any organism or object that they encounter. Certainly no other animal in their given ecosystems, short perhaps of other bear species and humans, can claim to feed on as broad a range of dietary opportunities. Food that is both abundant and easily obtained is preferred. Their jaw structure has evolved to fit their dietary habits. Their diet varies enormously throughout their differing areas based on opportunity. In spring, winter-provided carrion, grasses, shoots, sedges and forbs are the dietary mainstays for brown bears from almost every part of their distribution. Fruits, including berries, become increasingly important during summer and early autumn. Roots and bulbs become critical in autumn for some inland bear populations if fruit crops are poor. The dietary variability is illustrated in the western United States, as meat made up 51% of the average year-around diet for grizzly bears from Yellowstone National Park, while it made up only 11% of the year-around diet for grizzlies from Glacier National Park a few hundred miles to the north.

== Plants and fungi ==
Despite their reputation, most brown bears are not highly carnivorous, as they derive up to 90% of their dietary food energy from vegetable matter. Brown bears often feed on a variety of plant life, including berries, grasses, flowers, acorns (Quercus ssp.) and pine cones as well as mosses and fungi such as mushrooms. In total, over 200 plant species have been identified in their foods. Arguably the most herbivorous diets have come from the warmer temperate parts of Eurasia as more than 90% of the diet may be herbivorous. These include countries and regions such as Spain, Slovakia, most of the Balkans including Greece, Turkey, the Himalayas and presumably the Middle East. In many inland portions of North America the diet of grizzly bears is between 80 and 90% plant-based, but animal meat can be much more important in some areas. It has been found that being restricted to a largely vegetarian diet puts constraints on the growth and size of bears who live off them, largely because their digestive systems do not process plants as well as animal fats and proteins.

Among all living bears, brown bears are uniquely equipped to dig for tough foods, such as roots and shoots. They use their long, strong claws to dig out earth to reach the roots and their powerful jaws to bite through them. For the most part, the consumed plant life in spring, predominantly roots immediately post-hibernation and grasses later in spring, is not highly nutritious for bears and mainly staves off hunger and starvation until more nutritious food is available. Brown bears have difficulty digesting large quantities of tough, fibrous foods. Hedysarum roots are among the most commonly eaten foods from throughout the range and can become important substitutes if stable foods such as fruits become unavailable. Corms and bulbs are important when available, as they are one of the greater sources of protein in plant life, as are hard masts such as acorns. Brown bears are restricted in their access to hard masts compared to American and Asian black bears because of the limited climbing abilities of grown bears and therefore are confined largely to masts fallen to the ground, pirated from other creatures or within a reach of about 3 m (9 ft 10 in) that the bears can stretch to with their paws extended and standing on their hindlegs. Hard masts can become the most important food (although consumed mainly in late summer and fall) where available in large quantities such as on Hokkaido, Italy and Spain. One of the most important foods in the Rocky Mountains region of the United States is the whitebark pine nut (Pinus albicaulis), which is attained perhaps a majority of the time by raiding the once-abundant caches of American red squirrels (Tamiasciurus hudsonicus) rather than direct foraging. The decline of whitebark pine nuts due to the inadvertent introduction by man of the invasive, virulent fungi Cronartium ribicola has in turn required grizzlies to seek alternative food sources, many of which are carnivorous. In a Greek food study, soft masts were found to outrank hard masts as a food source, with about a quarter of the year-around diet consisting of the legume Medicago.

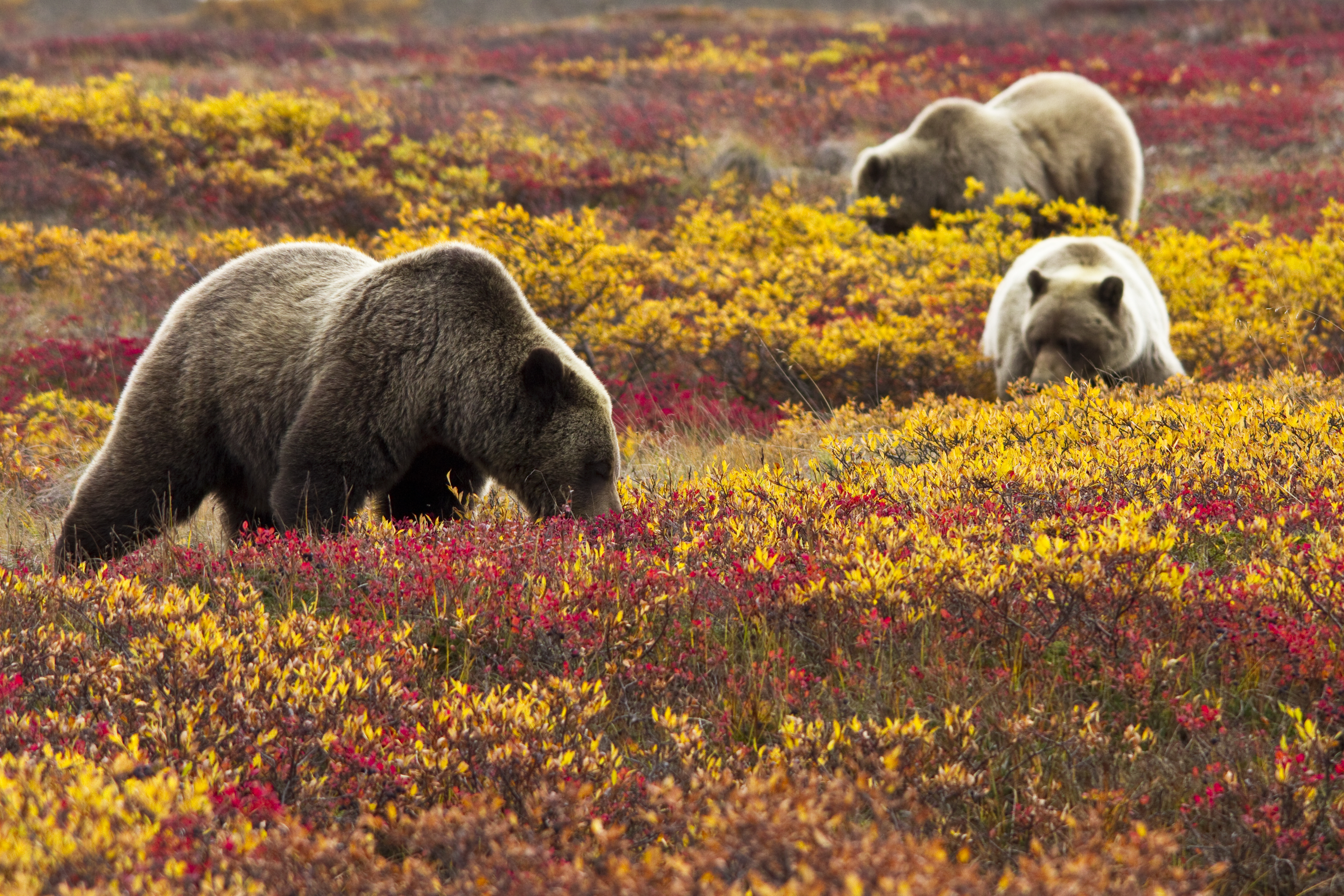
A grizzly bear sow and her two cubs foraging in a field for wild blueberries

Fruits and berries are indispensable for brown bears in most areas as a high-energy food stuff for bears, which is necessary to survive the hibernation cycle. The variety of fruits consumed is high, with most of the well-known, wild fruiting plants in temperate North America and Eurasia attracting brown bears in late summer and fall. Among the most prominent fruits found in their foods from through the range include many Prunus species including prunes and cherries, crowberries (Empetrum nigrum), pears (Pyrus ssp.), crabapples (Malus ssp.), brambles (Rubus fruticosus), raspberries (Rubus idaeus), bearberries (Arctostaphylos ssp.) (reportedly named for bears' fondness for them), blueberries (Vaccinium ssp.), lingonberries (Vaccinium vitis-idaea) and huckleberries (Vaccinium parvifolium). Fruit appears to become more secondary in the diet in areas where hard masts and animal protein are abundant in late summer and fall, as these more protein-rich foods appear to be more nutritious for bears than carbohydrate-rich fruits are, despite their fondness for fruit. Even where fruit are commonly eaten, other foods must be eaten to meet nutritional requirements. It is estimated that a small female brown bear may need to eat nearly 30,000 berries each day in late summer/fall in order to subsist on a purely fruit-based diet.

== Invertebrates ==
Brown bears will also commonly consume animal matter, which in summer and autumn may regularly be in the form of insects, larvae such as grubs and including beehives. Most insects eaten are of the highly social variety found in colonial nests, which provide a likely greater quantity of food, although they will also tear apart rotten logs on the forest floor, turn over rocks or simply dig in soft earth in attempts to consume individual invertebrates such as bugs, beetles and earthworms. Honey bees and wasps are important supplemental foods in Eurasia from the furthest west of their range, in Spain, to the furthest east, in Hokkaido. Bears in Yellowstone and Montana eat an enormous number of moths during the summer, sometimes consuming as many as 40,000 army cutworm moths (Euxoa auxiliaris) in a single day, and may derive up to half of their annual food energy from these insects. In Europe, a variety of species of ants have been found to factor heavily into the diet in some areas such as Scandinavia and eastern Europe. In Slovenia, for example, up to 25% of the dry mass consumed by brown bears was ants. Locally heavy consumption of ants has been reported in North America as well, as in west-central Alberta, 49% of scat contained ants. Brown bears mainly feed on ants with a passive response to the colony being dug out and low levels of formic acid, therefore carpenter ants (Camponotus ssp.), which are accessed through rotten logs rather than underground colonies, are preferred where available. Other important insect aggregations that brown bears feed heavily on in some regions include ladybird beetles and caddisfly and cicada nymphs. Brown bears living near coastal regions will regularly eat crabs and clams. In Alaska's Katmai National Park and Preserve, brown bears along the beaches of estuaries regularly dig through the sand for soft-shell clam (Mya arenaria) and Pacific razor clam (Siliqua patula), providing a more nutritious source of dietary energy in spring than plant life before fish become available there. The zarigani (Cambaroides japonicus), a type of crayfish, of Hokkaido is also an important, protein-rich dietary supplement for brown bears there.

== Fish ==
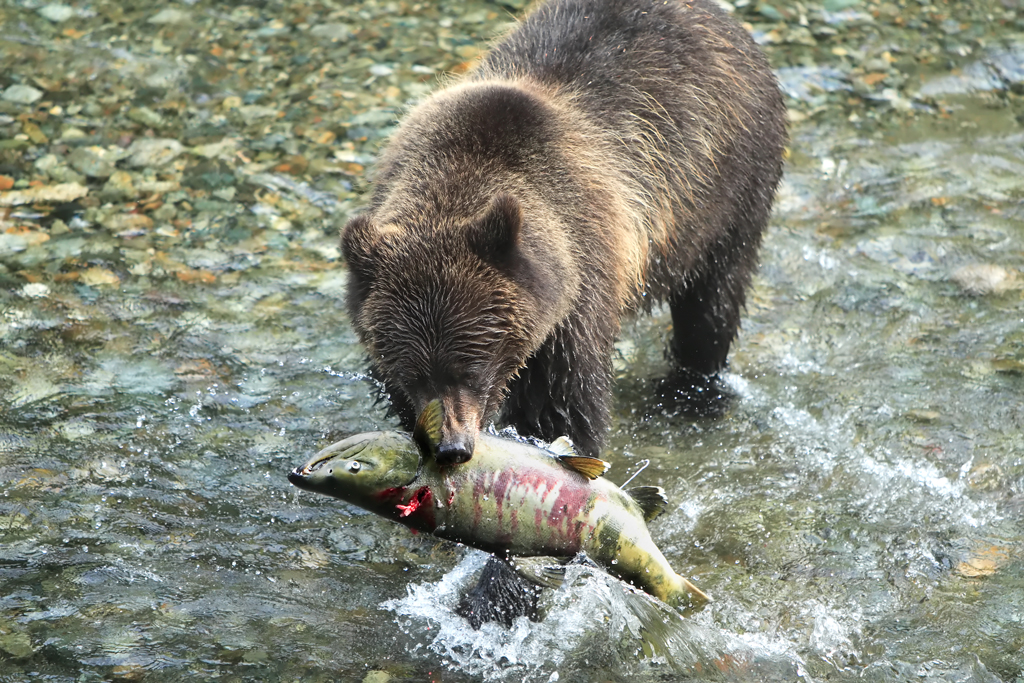
A young Alaska Peninsula brown bear carrying a salmon

By far the closest dietary relationship between brown bears and fish occurs between the salmon and trout of the genus Oncorhynchus, particularly in coastal areas, but also in some inland areas of North America. In the Kamchatka peninsula and several parts of coastal Alaska, including Kodiak Island, brown bears feed largely on spawning salmon, whose nutrition and abundance explain the enormous size of the bears in these areas. Sockeye salmon (O. nerka) and pink salmon (O. gorbuscha) are the two most commonly preyed upon, but many coho (O. kisutch), Chinook (O. tshawytscha), masu (O. masou) and chum salmon (O. keta) are also taken. Even in the coastal ranges of the Pacific, a diverse omnivorous diet is eaten, with the salmon spawning reliably providing food only in late summer and early fall. Exceptionally, salmon may come to inland rivers as early as June in the Brooks River when other coastal Alaskan bears are in their dietary "lean period" and provide food for bears sooner than normal. On Kodiak island, it appears the availability of alternative food sources is high, as berry crops are often profuse, marine organisms often wash up and ungulates both wild and domesticated are available. The fishing techniques of bears are well-documented. They often congregate around falls when the salmon are forced to breach the water, at which point the bears will try to catch the fish in mid-air (often with their mouths). They will also wade into shallow waters, hoping to pin a slippery salmon with their claws. While they may eat almost all the parts of the fish, bears at the peak of spawning, when there is usually a glut of fish to feed on, may eat only the most nutritious parts of the salmon (including the eggs (if the salmon is female) and the head) and then indifferently leave the rest of the carcass to scavengers, which can include red foxes (Vulpes vulpes), bald eagles (Haliaeetus leucocephalus), common ravens (Corvus corax) and gulls. Despite their normally solitary habits, brown bears will gather rather closely in numbers at good spawning sites. The largest and most powerful males claim the most fruitful fishing spots and bears (especially males) will sometimes fight over the rights to a prime fishing spot. Despite their aggressive defensive abilities, female brown bears usually select sub-optimal fishing spots to avoid male bears that could potentially threaten their cubs.

One other key relationship between brown bears and Oncorhynchus species occurs with the grizzly bear and the cutthroat trout (O. clarki) in the Rockies such as around Yellowstone. Here this species was consumed in considerable numbers although, like the whitebark pine nut, this food source has declined due to invasive species introduced by man, i.e. invasive trout species which are outcompeting cutthroat trout. The now-extinct California grizzly bear was also a fairly specialized Oncorhynchus predator in California's mountain streams and rivers, principally of rainbow trout (O. mykiss). Outside of Pacific-based salmonids, predatory relationships between brown bears and fish are uncommon. Predation on broad whitefish (Coregonus nasus) and longnose suckers (Catostomus catostomus) has been reported in sub-Arctic Canada and northern pike (Esox lucius) and Arctic grayling (Thymallus thymallus) in Siberia, plus other older records of brown bears hunting miscellaneous freshwater fish in Eurasia.

== Mammals ==
Beyond the regular predation of salmon, most brown bears are not particularly active predators. Nonetheless, brown bears are capable of obtaining practically all forms of the mammals that they encounter: from mouse-like rodents to those as fearsome as a tiger or as large as a bison. Over 100 species of mammal have been recorded either in the scats of brown bears or have been observed as being killed or consumed by the species, although much of this consumption probably represents merely scavenging on carrion.

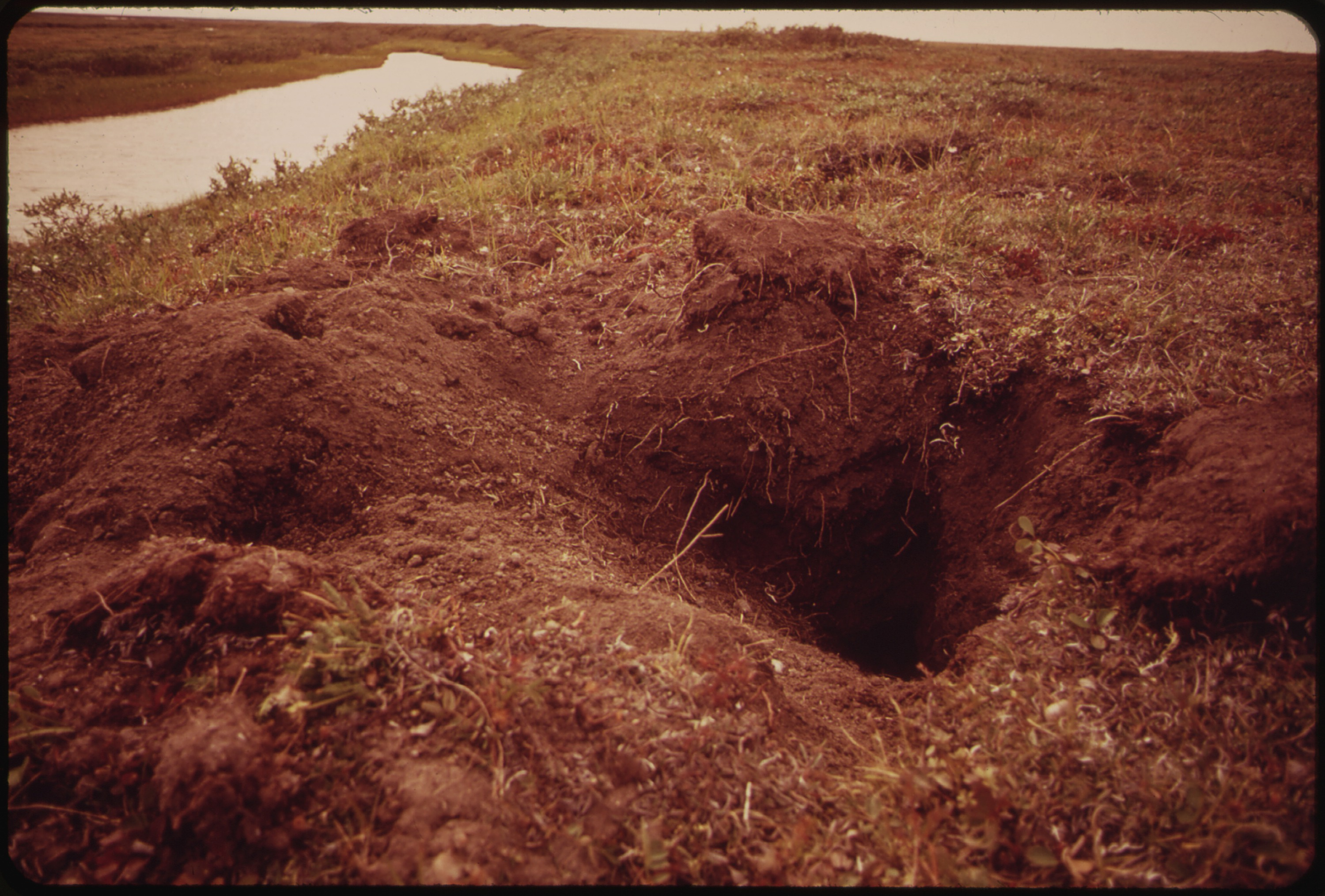
An Arctic ground squirrel burrow that has been excavated by a hunting barren-ground grizzly bear

A perhaps surprisingly high balance of mammalian foods consists of rodents or similar smallish mammals, as about half of the species consumed by brown bears weigh less than 10 kg (22 lb) on average. These may include hares (Lepus ssp.), pikas (Ochotona ssp.), marmots (Marmota ssp.), ground squirrels, chipmunks, mice, rats, lemmings and voles. Due to their propensity for digging, brown bears are able to smell out active burrows of these small mammals and either wait quietly or furiously dig away until the animals are either displaced and lunged at or are cornered in their burrows. Given that most small burrowing mammals found in cool temperate zones enter hibernation, they may be eaten most often when the brown bears exit hibernation earlier, as befits their larger size, allowing them to catch animals in torpor that may otherwise be too agile. Not only do they consume the small mammals, but they also feed on their caches, as has been recorded in grizzly bears attacking voles and northern pocket gophers (Thomomys talpoides). In some areas, caches may be the primary target when bears dig at these animal's burrows, as may be the case with Siberian chipmunks (Eutamias sibiricus), whose hoards can contain up to 20 kg (44 lb) of food, with the chipmunks themselves only being caught occasionally. With particular regularity, tundra-dwelling grizzlies will wait at burrows of Arctic ground squirrels (Spermophilus parryii) hoping to pick off a few of the 750 g (2 lb) rodents. Ground squirrel hunting is most successful in September and October, when early snow may impede the rodents' rocky escape routes. In Denali National Park, Arctic ground squirrels represent about 8% of the year-round diet of grizzly bears and are the most consistent source of animal protein for grizzlies there. An even more important dietary relationship with a small mammal occurs in the Tibetan blue bear, which is apparently the most completely carnivorous brown bear type, foraging most regularly for plateau pikas (Ochotona curzoniae), a species about one-sixth the weight of an Arctic ground squirrel. As many as 25 pikas have been found in a single bear's stomach and in Changtang, 60% of the diet consisted of pikas. Where plateau pikas are absent, as in the Mustang region of Nepal, Himalayan marmots (Marmota himalayana) become the dietary staple of the bear, occurring in about half of nearly 1,000 scats. Large rodents such as beavers (Castor spp.) and North American porcupines (Erethizon dorsatum) are rare prey items, mostly due to differing habitat preferences, as well as the obvious defenses of the latter. Up to five species of cetaceans have been recorded as a food source in the coastal regions of Alaska, the Central Arctic and (formerly) California when beached.

In most of their range, brown bears regularly feed on ungulates. In many cases, this important food source is obtained as carrion. Carrion is mostly eaten in spring, when winter snow and ice conditions (including snowslides) and starvation claim many ungulate lives. As carcasses are often solidly frozen when encountered, brown bears may sit on them to thaw them sufficiently for consumption. While perhaps a majority of bears of the species will charge at ungulates at some point in their lives, many predation attempts start with the bear clumsily and half-heartedly pursuing the prey and end with the prey escaping alive. On the other hand, some brown bears are quite self-assured predators who habitually pursue and catch large prey items, mainly ungulates. Such bears are usually taught how to hunt by their mothers from an early age. They are the most regular predator of ungulates among extant bear species. The extent of hunting behavior differs by region. For example, in Slovenia, ungulate meat was four times more likely to be obtained as carrion than through hunting, while on the contrary in east-central Alaska, live hunting of ungulates was four times more likely than scavenging of carrion. The extent of carnivory in brown bears has been proven to increase at northern latitudes. When brown bears attack these large animals, they usually target young or infirm ones, as they are easier to catch. Successful hunts usually occur after a short rush and ambush, but they may chase down prey in the open and will try to separate mother and young. Prey is usually killed when the bear grabs the rib cage over the back and delivers a bite to the back of the head, neck, face or nose. The bear may also pin its prey (usually young) to the ground and then immediately tear and eat it alive. Despite being characterized as unskilled predators with minimally-refined hunting skills, most individual bears who are routine ungulate predators have shown the ability to vary their hunting strategy and have hunting success rates comparable to other large, solitary carnivorans. Brown bears will on occasion bite or swipe at some prey in order to stun it enough to knock it over for consumption. To pick out young or infirm individuals, bears will charge at herds so the slower-moving and more vulnerable individuals will be made apparent. Brown bears may also ambush young animals by finding them via scent. Despite being characterized as a danger primarily to young, spring neonatal ungulates in the first couple of days of life, when they have undeveloped legs and cannot run at full speed, young ungulates may be pursued well into summer or fall after they have developed running abilities. Most attacks on adult ungulates occur when the prey has some variety of physical disadvantage. When emerging from hibernation, brown bears, whose broad paws allow them to walk over most ice and snow, may pursue large prey such as moose, whose hooves cannot support them on encrusted snow. Similarly, predatory attacks on large prey sometimes occur at riverbeds, when it is more difficult for the prey specimen to run away due to muddy or slippery soil. On rare occasions, most importantly when confronting unusually large, fully-grown and dangerous prey, bears kill them by hitting with their powerful forearms, which can break the necks and backs of large creatures such as adult moose and adult bison.

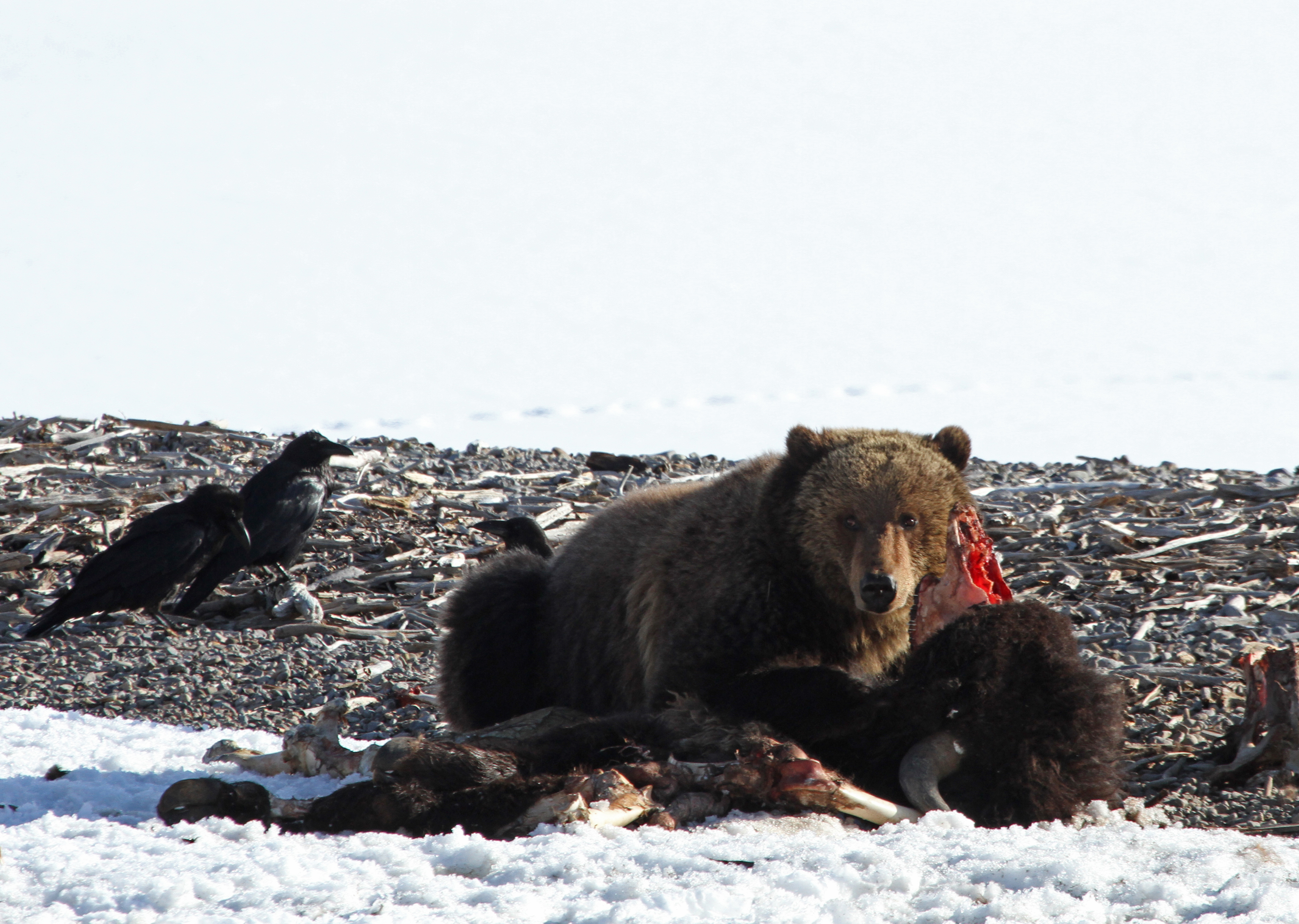
A grizzly bear feasts on a bison carcass in Yellowstone

The leading ungulate prey for brown bears is normally deer. Up to a dozen species have been eaten by brown bears, but the main prey species are the larger species they encounter: elk (Cervus canadensis), moose (Alces alces) and caribou (Rangifer tarandus). Larger deer are preferred because they tend to be less agile and swift than small or medium-sized deer (although a caribou can handily outpace a grizzly bear in the open), they are found in large quantities in several areas inhabited by brown bears and provide a larger meal per carcass. Moose may be preferred where found in large numbers because of their solitary habits and tendency to dwell in wooded areas, both of which makes them easier to ambush. Despite its diminished reputation as a predator, the brown bear is the most dangerous solitary predator of moose, with only packs of wolves a more regular predator; even Siberian tigers take other prey, primarily (elk and boar), in areas where they co-exist with the giant deer. Brown bears normally avoid the potential risks of hunting large deer, which can potentially fight back but usually escape bears by running, by picking out young calves or sickly adults from deer herds. In northeastern Norway, it was found that moose were the most important single food item (present in up to 45% of scats and locally comprising more than 70% of the bear's dietary energy) for local brown bears and several local bears appear to be specialized moose hunters, most often picking off sickly yearling moose and pregnant but healthy cows. In Yellowstone National Park, grizzly bears who derived much of their food energy from ungulates were studied, and 30% of the ungulates consumed were through predation, the remaining amount from scavenging of carcasses. Elk, bison and moose (the three largest native ungulates in the region) each constituted nearly a quarter of the overall ungulate diet. 13% of the total of ungulates actively hunted and killed per that study in Yellowstone were elk calves, while 8% of the actively and successfully hunted prey there were adult cow elk. Despite their lack of preference for smaller deer, other species including red deer (Cervus elaphus), sika deer (Cervus nippon ), axis deer (Axis axis), European roe deer (Capreolus capreolus), Siberian roe deer (Capreolus pygargus), fallow deer (Dama dama), mule deer (Odocoileus hemionus) and white-tailed deer (Odocoileus virginianus) have turned up in their diet.

As many as 20 species of bovids are also potential prey, including various sheep, goats, antelope, bison (Bison ssp.) and muskoxen (Ovibos moschatus). Bovids are mostly taken in random encounters when bears come across a vulnerable, usually young or sickly individual, as smaller species are extremely agile (and often live in rocky environments) and larger varieties are potentially dangerous, especially if aware of the bear's presence. In some parts of eastern Europe and Russia, wild boar (Sus scrofa) may be taken in surprisingly large quantities, considering the mostly herbivorous reputation of bears in these regions. One study from the Amur territory of Russia found that brown bears were actually more prolific killers of wild boars than both tigers and gray wolves, but these results are probably biased due to the scarcity of tigers in the region because of overhunting of the big cat. In rare cases, brown bears are capable of killing bulls of the largest ungulates in regions they inhabit, reportedly including moose, muskox, wild yak (Bos mutus) and both American and European bison (Bison bison and B. bonasus). Remarkably, such attacks are sometimes carried out by bears that were not particularly large, including interior sow grizzlies or small-bodied bears from the Central Arctic, and some exceptional ungulates taken may be up to two to three times the weight of the attacking bear. However, most of the bears who took adult moose in east-central Alaska and Scandinavia were large, mature males.

== Other vertebrates ==
This species may eat birds and their eggs, including almost entirely ground- or rock-nesting species. Although not typically able to capture a healthy grown bird; eggs, nestlings and fledglings of large bird species can be very attractive to brown bears. Species attacked have ranged can be any size available from Aleutian terns (Onychoprion aleuticus) to trumpeter and whooper swans (Cygnus buccinator and C. cygnus). Most recorded avian prey have consisted of geese and sea ducks nesting in the lower Arctic Circle, followed by coveys of galliforms, as these birds place their nests in shallow water and on the ground as well as raise their chicks in such areas, so they are relatively more vulnerable. Large birds of prey, including sea eagles, gyrfalcons (Falco rusticolus) and golden eagles (Aquila chrysaetos), are sometimes exploited as prey if nesting in rock formations that are accessible on foot, and eagles and falcons may furiously dive at bears near their nests. Due to their inhabitance of cooler temperate areas, reptiles and amphibians are rarely a food source and have been verified as prey only in a few cases: frogs in the Italian Alps, rat snakes in Hokkaido, grass lizards in the Amur territory and tortoises in Greece.

== Domestic animal food sources ==
When forced to live in close proximity with humans and their domesticated animals, bears may potentially prey on any type of domestic animal. Most type of livestock have been domesticated for millennia and have little to no anti-predator defenses. Therefore, brown bears are somewhat more likely to attack healthy adult domestic animals than they are healthy adult wild animals. Among domestic and farm animals, European cattle (Bos primigenius taurus) are sometimes exploited as prey. Cattle are bitten on the neck, back or head and then the abdominal cavity is opened for eating. In Norway, free-ranging domestic sheep (Ovis aries) are numerous and the local brown bears derive 65–87% of their dietary energy in late summer from sheep. Because of the aforementioned vulnerability, examination of Norwegian sheep remains suggest many of the sheep consumed there are adults that were killed by the bears rather than merely scavenged and thus some local farmers received partial compensation for their stock losses. In nearby northern Sweden, free-ranging sheep are not present and the bear derive their food predominantly from natural sources. Domestic horses (Equus ferus caballus), domestic goats (Capra aegagrus hircus), domestic pigs (Sus scrofa domesticus), domestic chickens (Gallus gallus domesticus) and domestic dogs (Canis lupus familaris) may be opportunistically killed in several parts of the brown bear's range as well. Plants and fruit farmed by humans are readily consumed as well, including corn (Zea mays), wheat (Triticum spp.), apples (Malus pumila), sorghum (Sorghum ssp.), melons and many species of berries. They will also feed at domestic bee farms, readily consuming both honey and the contents of the honey bee colony. Human food and trash or refuse is eaten when possible. When an open garbage dump was kept in Yellowstone, brown bears were one of the most voracious and regular scavengers. The dump was closed after both brown and American black bears came to associate humans with food and lost their natural fear of them. In other areas, such as Alaska, dumps may continue to be an attractant for brown bears.

== Enemies and competitors ==
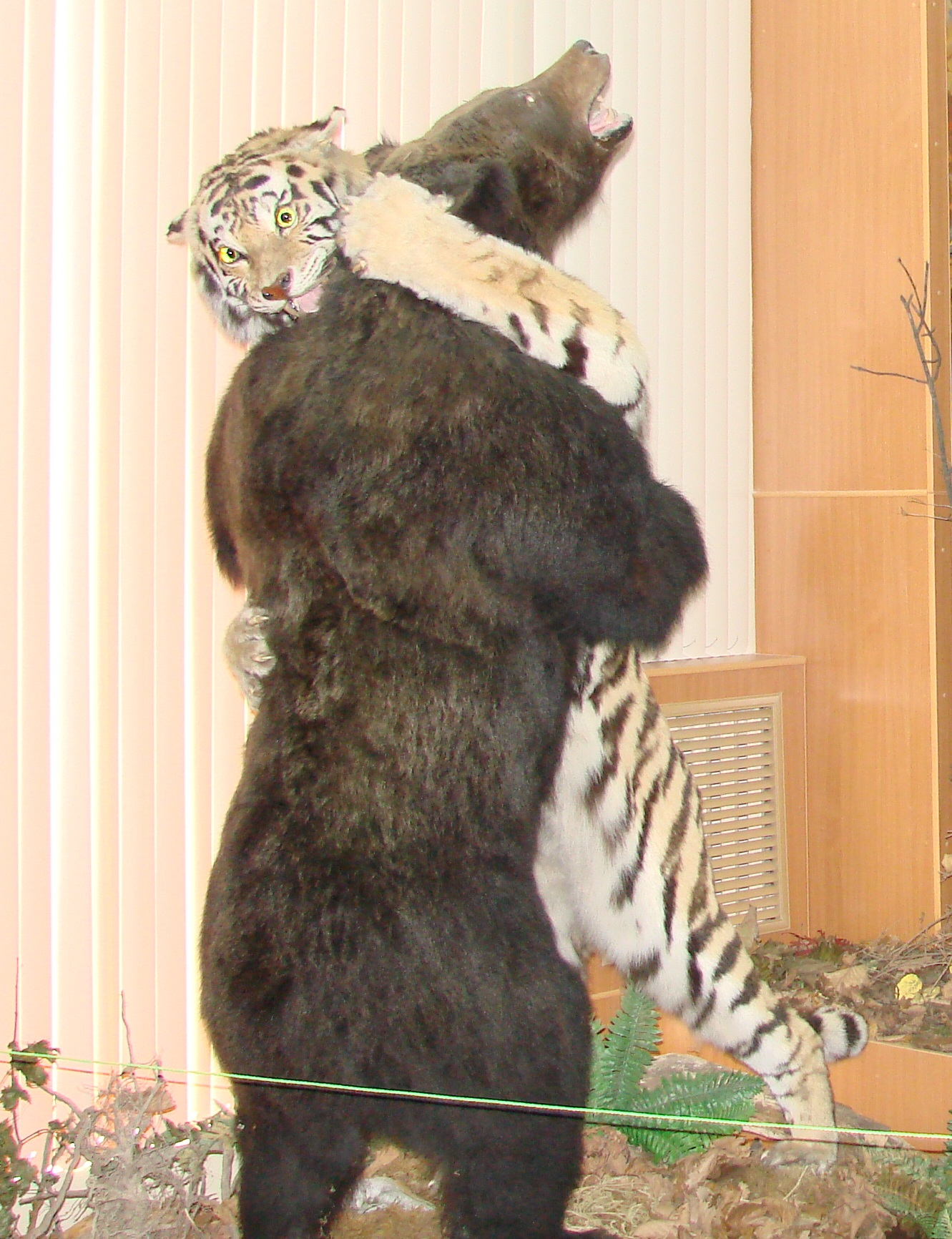
Taxidermy exhibit portraying a brown bear fighting a Siberian tiger, Vladivostok Museum

While feeding on carrion, brown bears use their size to intimidate other predators, such as gray wolves (Canis lupus), cougars (Puma concolor), tigers (Panthera tigris) and American black bears (Ursus americanus) from their kills. Owing to their formidable size and aggressive disposition, predation by wild animals outside of their own species is rare for brown bears of any age; even cubs are often safe due to their watchful mother. There are two records of golden eagles (Aquila chrysaetos) preying on brown bear cubs.

Adult bears are generally immune to predatory attacks except from tigers and other bears. Siberian tigers (Panthera tigris altaica) prefer preying on young bears but smaller, fully grown adult female brown bears outside their dens may also be taken. Successful predatory attacks by tigers on adult brown bears are usually on females, with or without cubs, in their dens. In the past, exceptionally large male Siberian tigers, such as one weighing approximately 300 kg (660 lb), were reportedly capable of killing even adult male brown bears, but such bears are otherwise more or less safe from attack. Of 44 recorded encounters between tigers and both Asian black and brown bears, 20 resulted in confrontations; in 50% of these, the bears in general (not necessarily brown bears) were killed, in 27% the tigers were killed, and 23% of the cases ended with both animals surviving and parting ways despite injuries sustained in the conflict. Some bears emerging from hibernation seek out tigers in order to steal their kills. Despite the possibility of tiger predation, some large brown bears may actually benefit from the tiger's presence by appropriating tiger kills that the bears may not be able to successfully hunt themselves and follow tiger tracks. Geptner et al. (1972) stated that bears are generally afraid of tigers and change their path after coming across tiger trails. In the winters of 1970–1973, Yudakov and Nikolaev recorded one case of a brown bear showing no fear of the tigers and another case of a brown bear changing its path upon crossing tiger tracks. Other researchers have observed bears following tiger tracks to scavenge tigers' kills or to prey on tigers. Bears frequently track down tigers to usurp their kills, with occasional fatal outcomes for the tiger. A report from 1973 describes 12 known cases of brown bears killing tigers, including adult male tigers; in all cases the tigers were subsequently eaten by the bears. There are reports of brown bears specifically targeting Amur leopards and tigers to appropriate their kills. In the Sikhote-Alin Reserve, 35% of tiger kills were stolen by bears, with the tigers either departing entirely or leaving part of the kill for the bear.

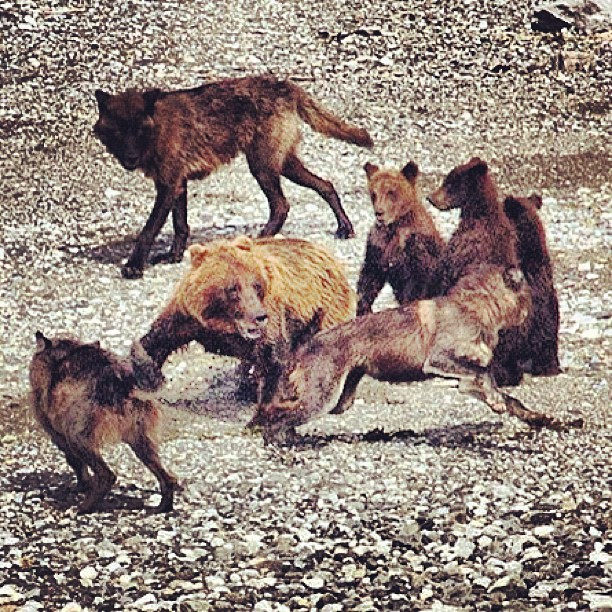
A mother grizzly bear and her cubs threatened by a pack of gray wolves, which reportedly did not or could not harm the cubs in this instance.

Brown bears regularly intimidate gray wolves (Canis lupus) away from their kills, with wolves occurring in most of the brown bear's worldwide distribution. In Yellowstone National Park, brown bears pirate wolf kills so often, Yellowstone's Wolf Project director Doug Smith wrote, "It's not a matter of if the bears will come calling after a kill, but when." Similarly, in Denali National Park, grizzly bears routinely rob wolf packs of their kills. On the contrary, in Katmai National Park and Preserve, wolves, even lone wolves, may manage to displace brown bears at carrion sites. Despite the high animosity between the two species, most confrontations at kill sites or large carcasses end without bloodshed on either side. Although conflict over carcasses is common, on rare occasions the two predators tolerate each other on the same kill. To date, there are only a few cases of fully-grown wolves being killed by brown bears and none of wolves killing healthy adult brown bears. Given the opportunity, however, both species will prey on the other's cubs. Conclusively, the individual power of the bear against the collective strength of the wolf pack usually results in a long battle for kills or domination.

In some areas, the grizzly bear also regularly displaces cougars (Puma concolor) from their kills, with some estimates showing cougars locally lose up to a third of their dietary energy to grizzly bears. Cougars kill small bear cubs on rare occasions, but there was one report of a bear killing a cougar of unknown age and condition between 1993 and 1996. Eurasian lynx (Lynx lynx), the largest type of lynx and the only one to regularly take large prey, is similarly an habitual victim of kleptoparasitism to brown bears throughout Eurasia. Brown bears also co-exist with leopards (Panthera pardus) (in very small remnant wild parts of the Middle East, Jammu and Kashmir, northeastern China and the Primorsky Krai) and snow leopards (Panthera uncia) in several areas of northern central Asia and the Tibetan Plateau). Although the brown bears' interactions with these big cats are little-known, they probably have similar relationships as grizzly bears do with cougars in North America. Snow leopards and Tibetan blue bears are verified, however, to be a threat to one another's cubs.

Smaller carnivorous animals are dominated by brown bears and generally avoid direct interactions with them, unless attempting to steal scraps of food. Species which utilize underground or rock dens tend to be more vulnerable to predatory attacks by brown bears. Several mustelids, including badgers, are not infrequently preyed upon and seemingly even arboreal martens may be attacked (especially if unhealthy or caught in furbearer traps). In North America, both species of otter (North American river and sea) have been known to be ambushed by brown bears when on land. On the contrary, wolverines (Gulo gulo) are known to have been persistent enough to fend off a grizzly bear as much as 10 times their weight from a kill. In some rare cases, wolverines have lost their lives to grizzly bears and wolverines in Denali National Park will reportedly try to avoid encounters with grizzlies. Beyond wolves, other canids may occasionally be killed around their den, most likely pups or kits, or adults if overly incautious near a carrion site, including coyotes (Canis latrans), multiple species of foxes and raccoon dogs (Nyctereutes procyonoides). Medium-sized cats may also be rarely killed by brown bears. Seals are on rare occasions killed by brown bears, including eyewitness accounts of Russian bears ambushing spotted (Phoca largha) and harbor seals (Phoca vitulina). Consumption of ringed (Pusa hispida) and bearded seal (Erignathus barbatus) has been reported in the Mackenzie river delta, presumably via predation or scavenging of polar bear kills, as pinnipeds are not usually encountered as carrion from land.

Brown bears usually dominate other bear species in areas where they coexist. Due to their smaller size, American black bears (Ursus americanus) are at a competitive disadvantage to brown bears in open, unforested areas. Although displacement of American black bears by brown bears has been documented, actual interspecific killing of American black bears by brown bears has only occasionally been reported. Confrontation is mostly avoided due to the American black bear's diurnal habits and preference for heavily forested areas, as opposed to the brown bear's largely nocturnal habits and preference for open spaces. Where they do not live in close proximity to grizzly bears, and especially where found near human habitations, American black bears may become, to a larger extent, nocturnal. Brown bears may also kill Asian black bears, though the latter species probably largely avoids conflicts with the brown bear due to similar habits and habitat preferences to the American black species. Brown bears will eat the fruit dropped from trees by the Asian black bear, as they themselves are too large and cumbersome to climb. Improbably, in the Himalayas, brown bears are reportedly intimidated by Asian black bears in confrontations. However, the Himalayan black bears are reportedly more aggressive towards humans than the Himalayan brown bear, and the latter is one of the smaller types of brown bear, though still somewhat larger than the Asian black bear. In Siberia, the opposite is true, and Asian black bears are not known to attack people, but brown bears are. Both species of black bear seem to be most vulnerable to predatory attacks by brown bears when the latter species leaves hibernation sooner in early spring and ambushes the smaller ursids in their dens.

There has been a recent increase in interactions between brown bears and polar bears (Ursus maritimus), theorized to be caused by climate change. Brown bears have been seen moving increasingly northward into territories formerly claimed by polar bears. Despite averaging somewhat smaller sizes, brown bears tend to dominate polar bears in disputes over carcasses, and dead polar bear cubs have been found in brown bear dens.

Large herbivores, such as moose, bison and muskox may have an intolerance of brown bears due to their possible threat to vulnerable members of their herds or themselves; moose regularly charge grizzly bears in their calf's defense, but seldom are the bears killed. Bison have been known to fatally injure lone grizzly bears in battles, and even a mountain goat (Oreamnos americanus) was observed to do so with its horns, although herbivores are rarely a serious danger to brown bears.
