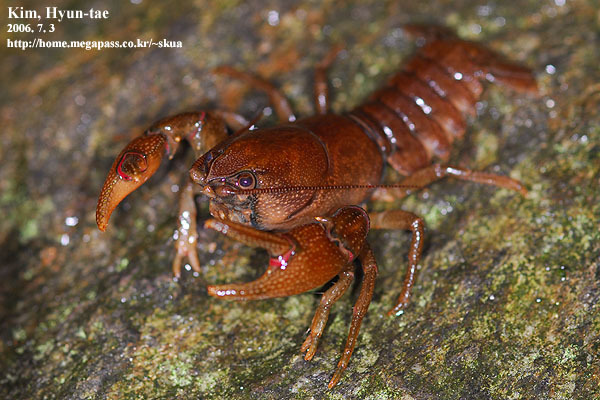

Conservation status
- Data Deficient (IUCN 3.1)

Scientific classification
- Kingdom: Animalia
- Phylum: Arthropoda
- Class: Malacostraca
- Order: Decapoda
- Suborder: Pleocyemata
- Family: Cambaroididae
- Genus: Cambaroides
- Species: C. similis

Binomial name
- Cambaroides similis (Koelbel, 1892)
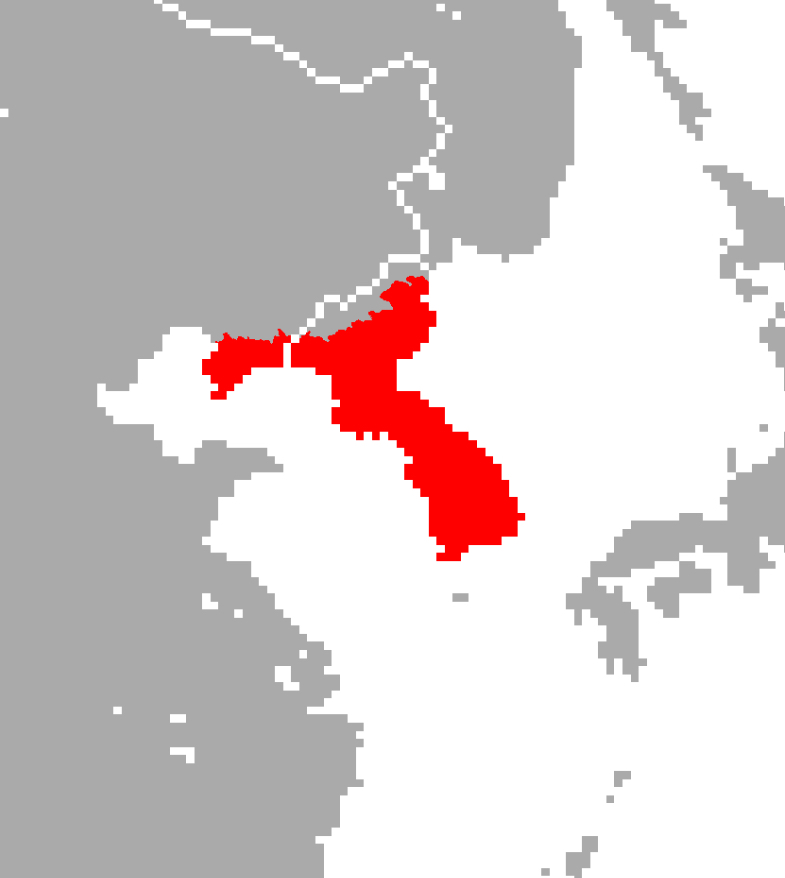

= Cambaroides similis =

Species of crayfish

Cambaroides similis is a species of crayfish endemic to the Korean Peninsula and neighbouring parts of China.
