= Cambaroides wladiwostokiensis =

Scientific classification
- Domain: Eukaryota
- Kingdom: Animalia
- Phylum: Arthropoda
- Class: Malacostraca
- Order: Decapoda
- Suborder: Pleocyemata
- Family: Cambaroididae
- Genus: Cambaroides
- Species: C. wladiwostokiensis

Binomial name
- Cambaroides wladiwostokiensis Birstein & Vinogradov, 1934

Species of crayfish

Cambaroides wladiwostokensis is a species of crayfish endemic to Primorsky Krai (Vladivostok) in Far East Russia.
