= Cambaroides sachalinensis =

Scientific classification
- Domain: Eukaryota
- Kingdom: Animalia
- Phylum: Arthropoda
- Class: Malacostraca
- Order: Decapoda
- Suborder: Pleocyemata
- Family: Cambaroididae
- Genus: Cambaroides
- Species: C. sachalinensis

Binomial name
- Cambaroides sachalinensis (De Haan, 1841)

Species of crayfish

Cambaroides sachalinensis is a species of freshwater crayfish endemic to Sakhalin, Russia.
