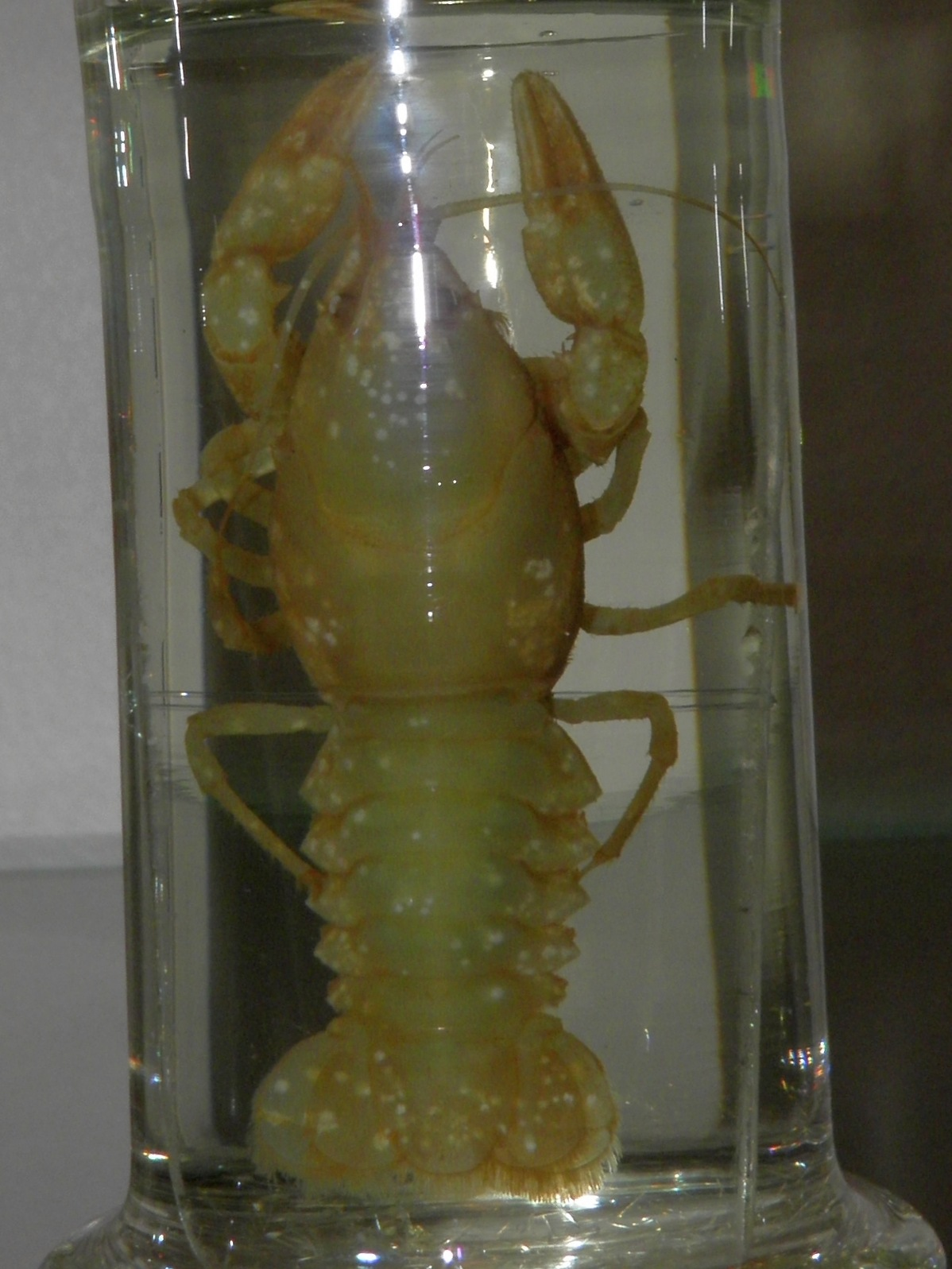

Conservation status
- Data Deficient (IUCN 3.1)

Scientific classification
- Kingdom: Animalia
- Phylum: Arthropoda
- Clade: Pancrustacea
- Class: Malacostraca
- Order: Decapoda
- Suborder: Pleocyemata
- Family: Cambaroididae
- Genus: Cambaroides
- Species: C. schrenckii

Binomial name
- Cambaroides schrenckii (Kessler, 1874)

= Cambaroides schrenckii =

Species of crayfish

Cambaroides schrenckii is a species of crayfish endemic to north-eastern China and Russia. It is a freshwater species that also occurs in some brackish water areas. It occurs in habitats with still water, typically no more than 1 metre deep. It was named after Leopold von Schrenck.
