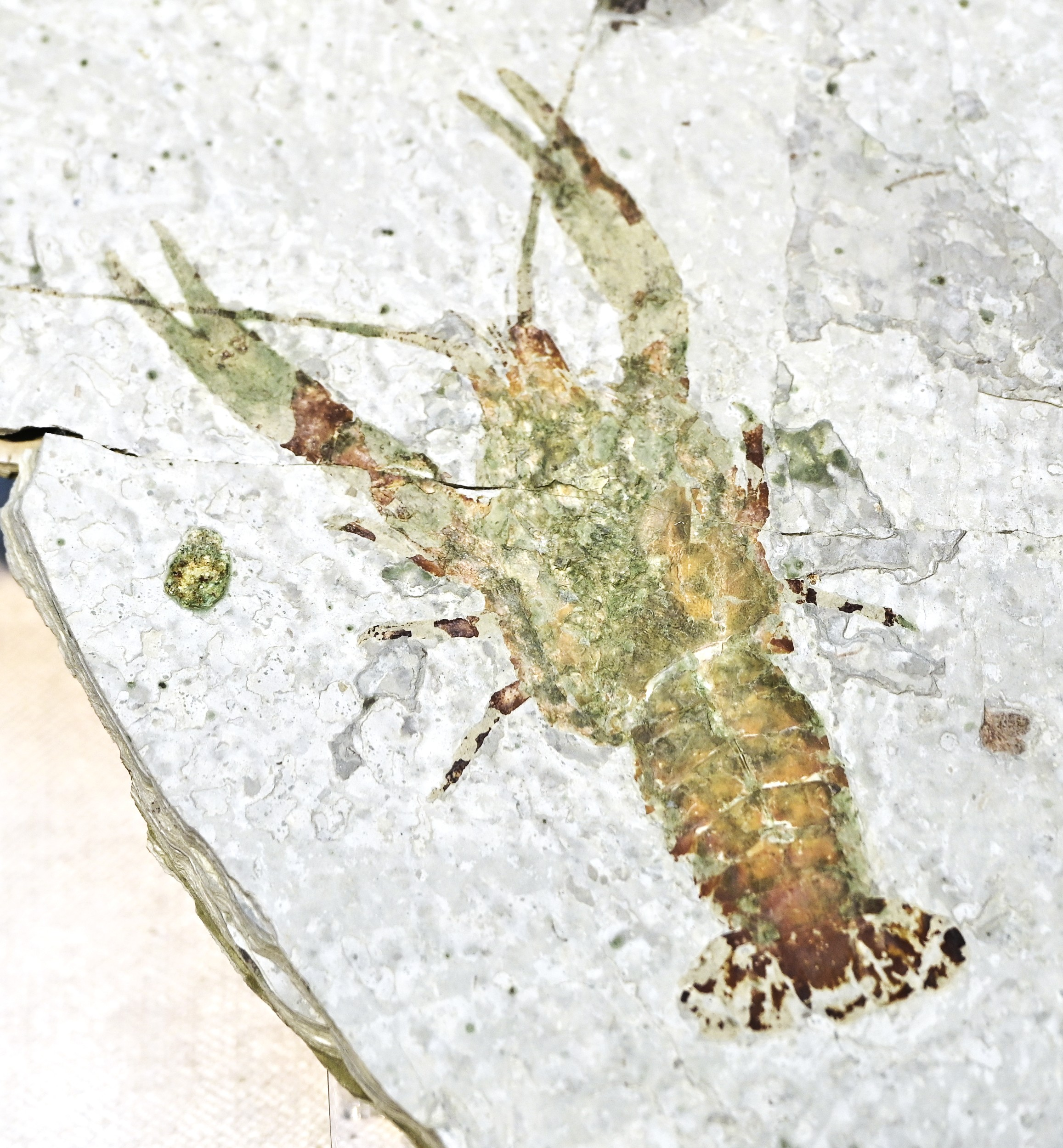
- P. licenti, National Natural History Museum of China

Scientific classification
- Kingdom: Animalia
- Phylum: Arthropoda
- Clade: Pancrustacea
- Class: Malacostraca
- Order: Decapoda
- Suborder: Pleocyemata
- Family: Cambaroididae
- Genus: †Palaeocambarus; Taylor, Schram & Shen, 1999
- Species: †P. licenti

Binomial name
- †Palaeocambarus licenti (Van Straelen, 1928)

Synonyms
- Astacus licenti Van Straelen, 1928 (type species): Astacus spinirostrius Imaizumi, 1938; Cricoidoscelus aethus Taylor et al., 1999; Mongolarachne chaoyangensis Cheng et al., 2019; Paleocambarus (lapsus calami)

= Palaeocambarus =

Palaeocambarus Temporal range: Early Cretaceous, Barremian–Aptian

Extinct genus of crustaceans

Palaeocambarus is an extinct genus of crayfish discovered in the Yixian Formation in China, with only a single species, Palaeocambarus licenti. It is one of the oldest known fossil crayfish.

The genus Cricoidoscelosus is now considered to be a junior synonym. It was initially believed to be Late Jurassic (Tithonian) in age, but it is now confirmed to have been Early Cretaceous (Barremian-Aptian) in age.

== Taxonomy ==
The species was first named by Van Straelen in 1928 as Astacus licenti. In 1999, the species was assigned to the new genus Palaeocambarus, and was placed in the family Cambaridae. In the same publication, the genus and species Cricoidoscelosus aethus was described, and was placed into the monotypic family Cricoidoscelosidae. In 2019, a supposed new species of the spider Mongolarachne, "Mongolarachne" chaoyangensis was described from the Yixian Formation in China. However, in a later publication that same year, when the specimen was subject to fluorescence microscopy, it was shown that the specimen was a forgery using specimen D3088, a specimen of Cricoidoscelosus, as a base, that had been painted to look like a spider, and as such the species was a junior synonym of Cricoidoscelosus. In 2023, a re-evalutation of crayfish from the Yixian Formation found that Cricoidoscelosus was a synonym of Palaeocambarus and that Palaeocambarus could be confidently placed in Cambaroididae, which includes modern East Asian crayfish (Cambaroides).
