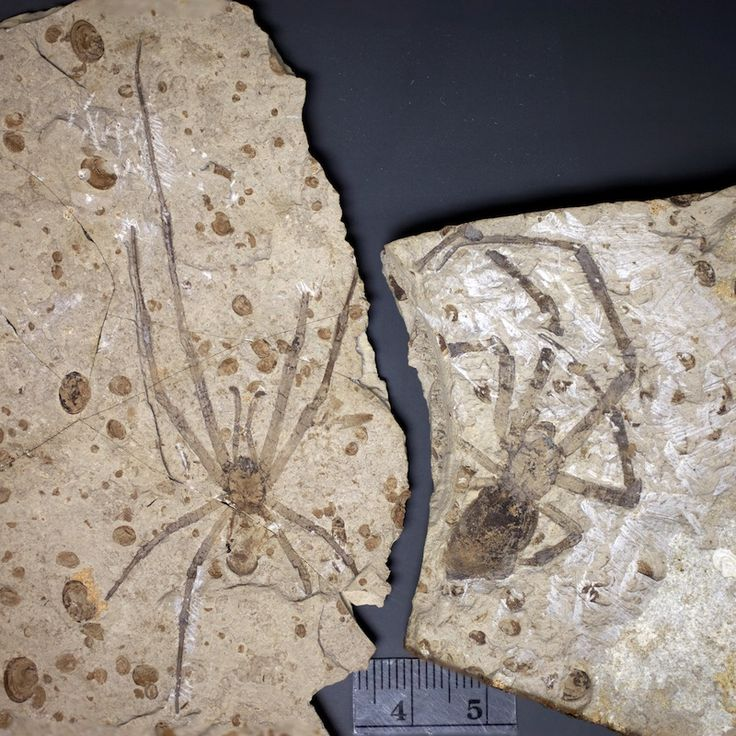
- Pair of male (left) and female (right) fossil Mongolarachne jurassica.

Scientific classification
- Kingdom: Animalia
- Phylum: Arthropoda
- Subphylum: Chelicerata
- Class: Arachnida
- Order: Araneae
- Infraorder: Araneomorphae
- Family: †Mongolarachnidae; Selden, Shih & Ren, 2013
- Genus: †Mongolarachne; Selden, Shih & Ren, 2013

Type species
- Nephila jurassica Selden, Shih & Ren, 2011

Species
- †M. jurassica Selden, Shih & Ren, 2013

= Mongolarachne =

Mongolarachne Temporal range: Middle Jurassic, 164 Ma

Extinct genus of spiders

Mongolarachne is an extinct genus of spiders placed in the monogeneric family Mongolarachnidae. The genus contains only one species, Mongolarachne jurassica, described in 2013, which is presently the largest fossilized spider on record. The type species was originally described as Nephila jurassica and placed in the living genus Nephila which contains the golden silk orb-weavers.

Subsequently, it was determined to be stem-orbicularian, i.e. a relative of the group Orbiculariae, which contains the family Nephilidae, but also several other families, such as Theridiidae, Theridiosomatidae or Uloboridae. The species is known only from the Middle Jurassic Jiulongshan Formation, part of the Daohugou Beds, near the village of Daohugou in Ningcheng County, northeastern China.

A second putative species, Mongolarachne chaoyangensis, was described in 2019, but it was subsequently shown to be a forgery based on a fossil crayfish.

Jorg Wunderlich placed Longissipalpus and Pedipalparaneus from the Cenomanian aged Burmese amber into Mongolarachnidae in 2015.

== History and classification ==
Mongolarachne jurassica is known only from two fossils, the holotype, specimen number "CNU-ARA-NN2010008" which is a mostly complete adult female and the later described allotopotype male, number CNU-ARA-NN2011001-1 (part) and CNU-ARA-NN20110001-2 (counterpart). The individuals are preserved as compression fossils in a pale grey finely laminated sedimentary tuff. The fossil specimens are from outcrops of the Jiulongshan Formation exposed in the Wuhua Township. The type specimens are currently preserved in the Key Lab of Insect Evolution & Environmental Changes collections housed in the Capital Normal University, located in Beijing, China. Mongolarachne jurassica was first studied by Paul Selden of the University of Kansas and the Natural History Museum along with Dong Ren and ChungKun Shih both of the Capital Normal University. Their 2011 type description of the genus and species was published online in the journal Biology Letters. The etymology of the specific epithet jurassica refers to the age of the species. The genus name Mongolarachne is derived from (Inner) Mongolia, where the fossils were found, and the Latin arachne meaning "spider". The family name is a derivative of the genus name.

If it had been confirmed, placement of Mongolarachne jurassica in the genus Nephila would have made it the oldest described species of the genus Nephila, extending the known fossil range of the genus back 130 million years. and making Nephila the longest lived modern spider genus known. However, with the removal of M. jurassica the oldest species in Nephila is again the Late Eocene species Nephila pennatipes from Colorado's Florissant Formation. The oldest recognized member of the family Nephilidae is the Cretaceous species Cretaraneus vilaltae of Spain. Fossils of female specimens are known only from N. pennatipes, all other fossil nephilids having been described from male specimens.

The placement of M. jurassica was first questioned by Kuntner et al. in 2013, who claimed that M. jurassica differs from extant members of the genus Nephila in many anatomical traits and cannot be assigned to this genus, or indeed to the family Nephilidae. According to Kuntner et al. (2013) in an academic conference presentation following the description of the species Paul Selden (the first author of the description of M. jurassica) suggested that M. jurassica might be cribellate; if confirmed this would have made it the only known cribellate member of Nephila and the only known cribellate araneoid. Kuntner et al. themselves considered the presence of cribellum to be a piece of evidence that M. jurassica was not in fact a nephilid. The authors suggested that M. jurassica lacked a striated cheliceral boss, which the authors considered to be "a key nephilid synapomorphy". The authors considered it more likely that this species is actually a stem-orbicularian.

This assessment was confirmed later in 2013 by Paul Selden, ChungKun Shih, and Dong Ren, with the description of a male M. jurassica which has notably different pedipalp morphology from that of male Nephila. The authors moved the species to the new genus Mongolarachne, which they assigned to a separate family Mongolarachnidae. The authors considered it most likely that M. jurassica is a stem-orbicularian, more distantly related to the group Araneoidea (including nephilids) than deinopids and uloborids are.

== Description ==
The holotype female is fossilized with her underside facing up. Portions of all but two of the legs are missing from the fossil. The carapace of the holotype is 9.31 by 6.83 millimeters (0.367 by 0.269 in) and the opisthosoma is 15.36 by 9.5 millimeters (0.605 by 0.374 in). The total body-length is approximately 24.6 millimeters (0.97 in) while the front legs reach about 56.5 millimeters (2.22 in) in length. This puts M. jurassica females in the same size-range as modern females of Nephila, and makes M. jurassica the largest described fossil spider. The tibia of the third leg features tufts of setae called gaiters, which are also found on the other three tibia. The feature of a gaiter on the third tibia is found only in modern Nephila and, according to the original authors of description of M. jurassica, its presence along with the large size indicated the species was part of the genus.

The allotopotype male has a body length of 16.54 millimeters (0.651 in) with elongated pedipalps.

== See also ==
- Goliath birdeater (Theraphosa blondi), largest known spider in the world by mass
- Giant huntsman spider, largest known spider in the world by leg span
- Cerbalus aravaensis, a huntsman spider found in Israel and Jordan
