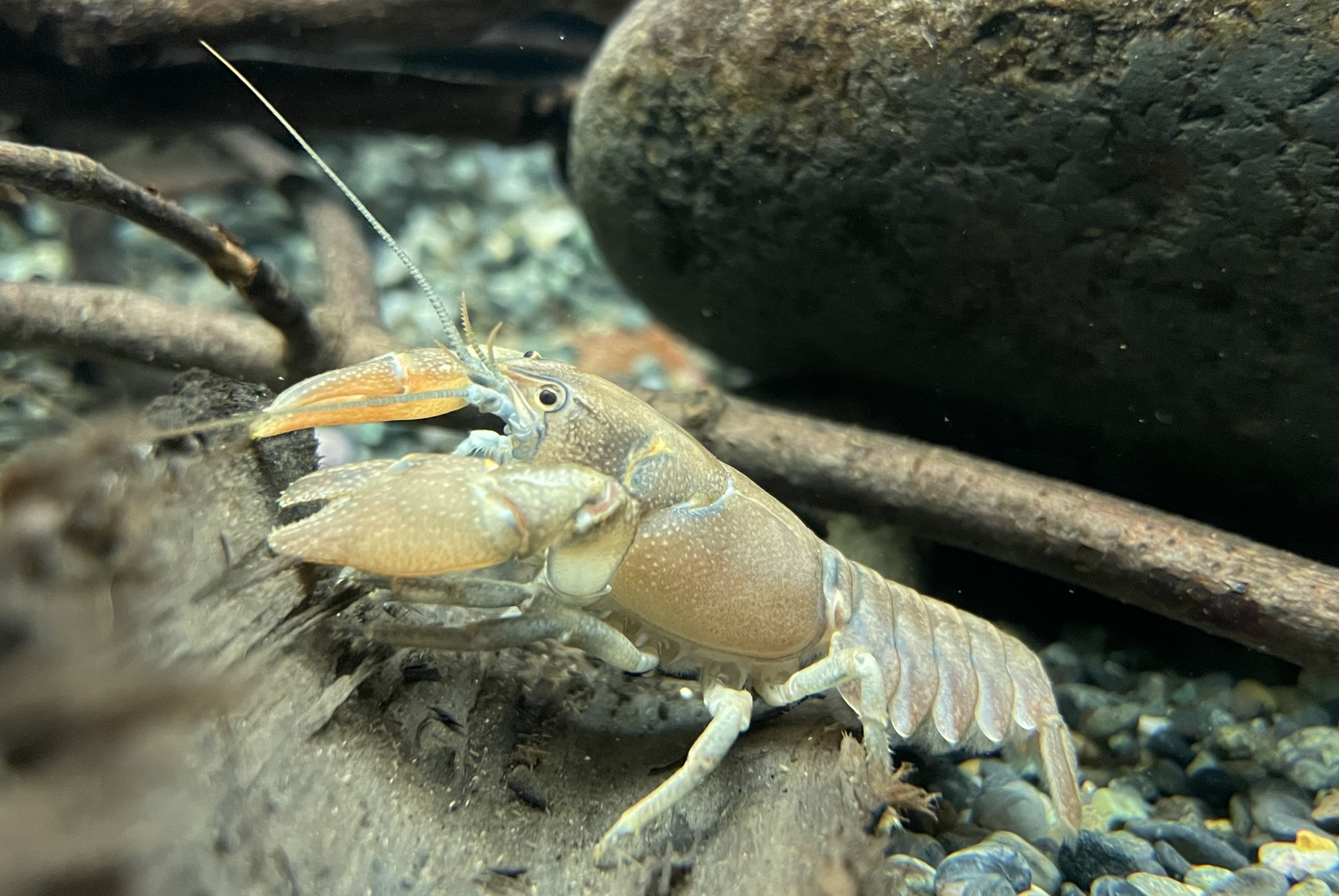

Conservation status
- Data Deficient (IUCN 3.1)

Scientific classification
- Kingdom: Animalia
- Phylum: Arthropoda
- Class: Malacostraca
- Order: Decapoda
- Suborder: Pleocyemata
- Family: Cambaroididae
- Genus: Cambaroides
- Species: C. japonicus

Binomial name
- Cambaroides japonicus (De Haan, 1841)
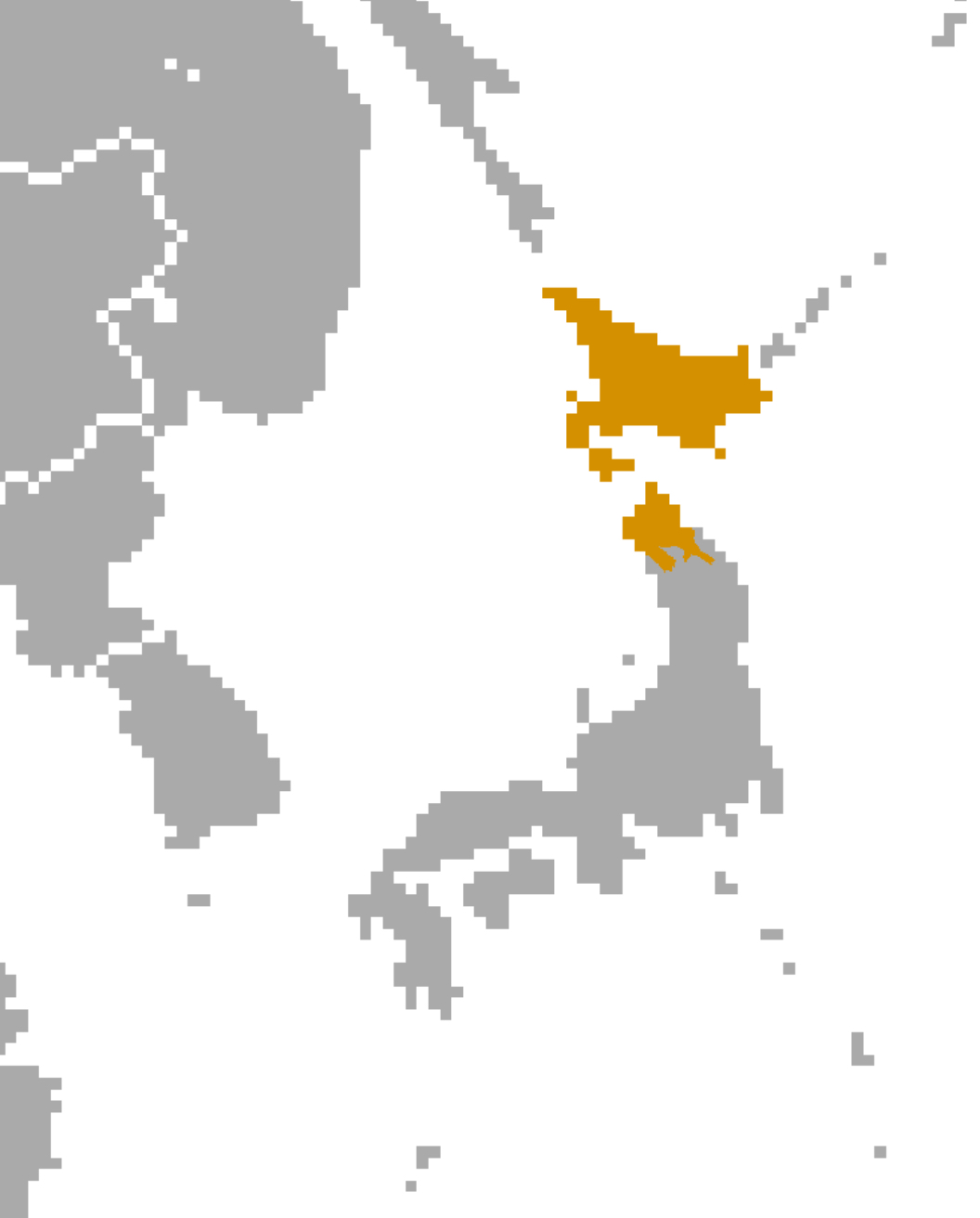

= Cambaroides japonicus =

Species of crayfish

Cambaroides japonicus, also known as Japanese crayfish (ニホンザリガニ, Nihon zarigani), is a species of crayfish endemic to Japan.

They are small in size (6 cm) and grayish in color. Its front claws are much weaker than the American crayfish, which is an invasive species in Japan. The Japanese crayfish needs low temperature and high water purity, so they live in upper streams of rivers or lakes in highland regions. These crayfish often burrow alongside the riverbank when breeding and hibernating. Studies have shown that Cambaroides japonicus preferentially select artificial burrows based on their relative size, leading to the conclusion that burrow patterns are related to size characteristics of the organism. The distribution of Japanese crayfish comprises Hokkaidō and northern Tōhoku (the northern area of Honshū).

The Environmental Agency (now Ministry of Environment) of Japan added it as a vulnerable species (IUCN category) to the Red Data List in 2000. It is thought that the causes of its decrease are corruption of water quality and the spread of the American crayfish Pacifastacus leniusculus, which was imported in the 20th century and has steadily proliferated in northern Japan. Some suspect that this American crayfish carries some disease, such as the crayfish plague known in Europe, that eliminates endemic crayfish.
