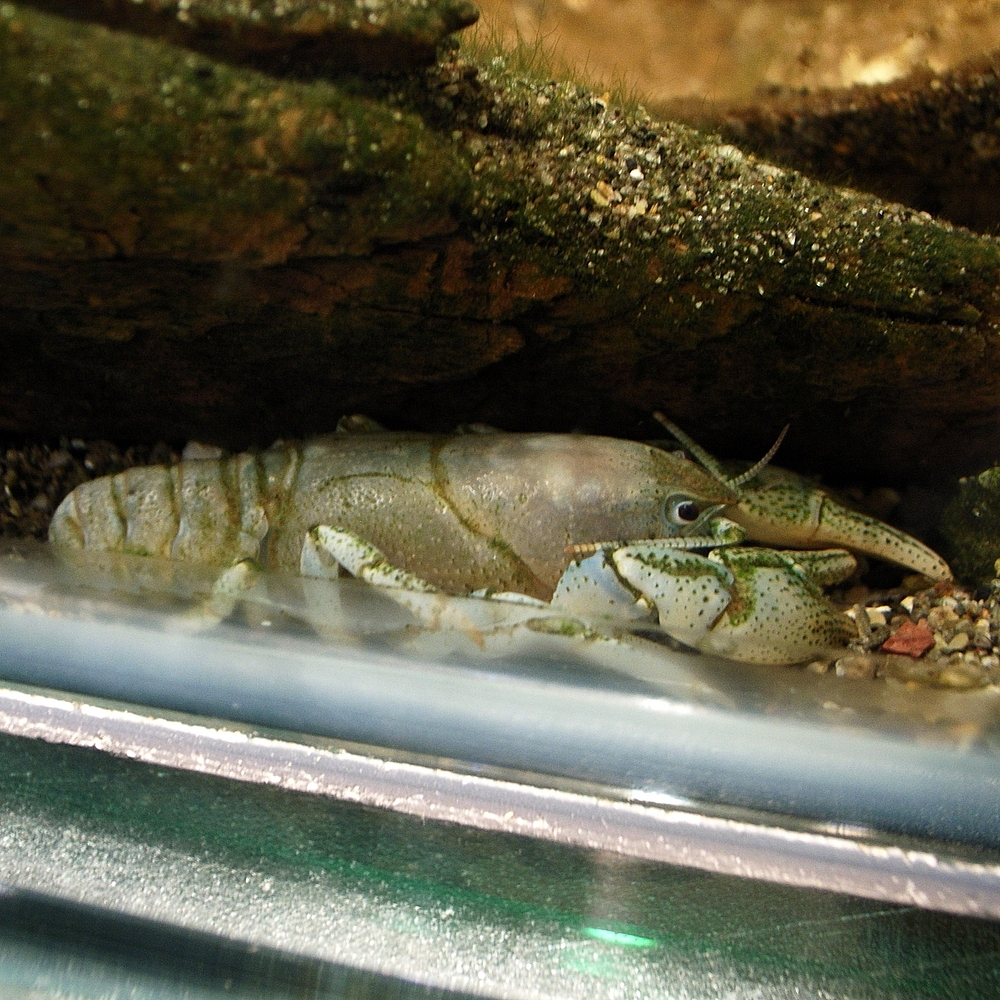
- Cambaroides japonicus

Scientific classification
- Domain: Eukaryota
- Kingdom: Animalia
- Phylum: Arthropoda
- Class: Malacostraca
- Order: Decapoda
- Suborder: Pleocyemata
- Infraorder: Astacidea
- Superfamily: Astacoidea
- Family: Cambaroididae
- Genus: Cambaroides; Faxon, 1884

Species
- See text

= Cambaroides =

Genus of crayfishes

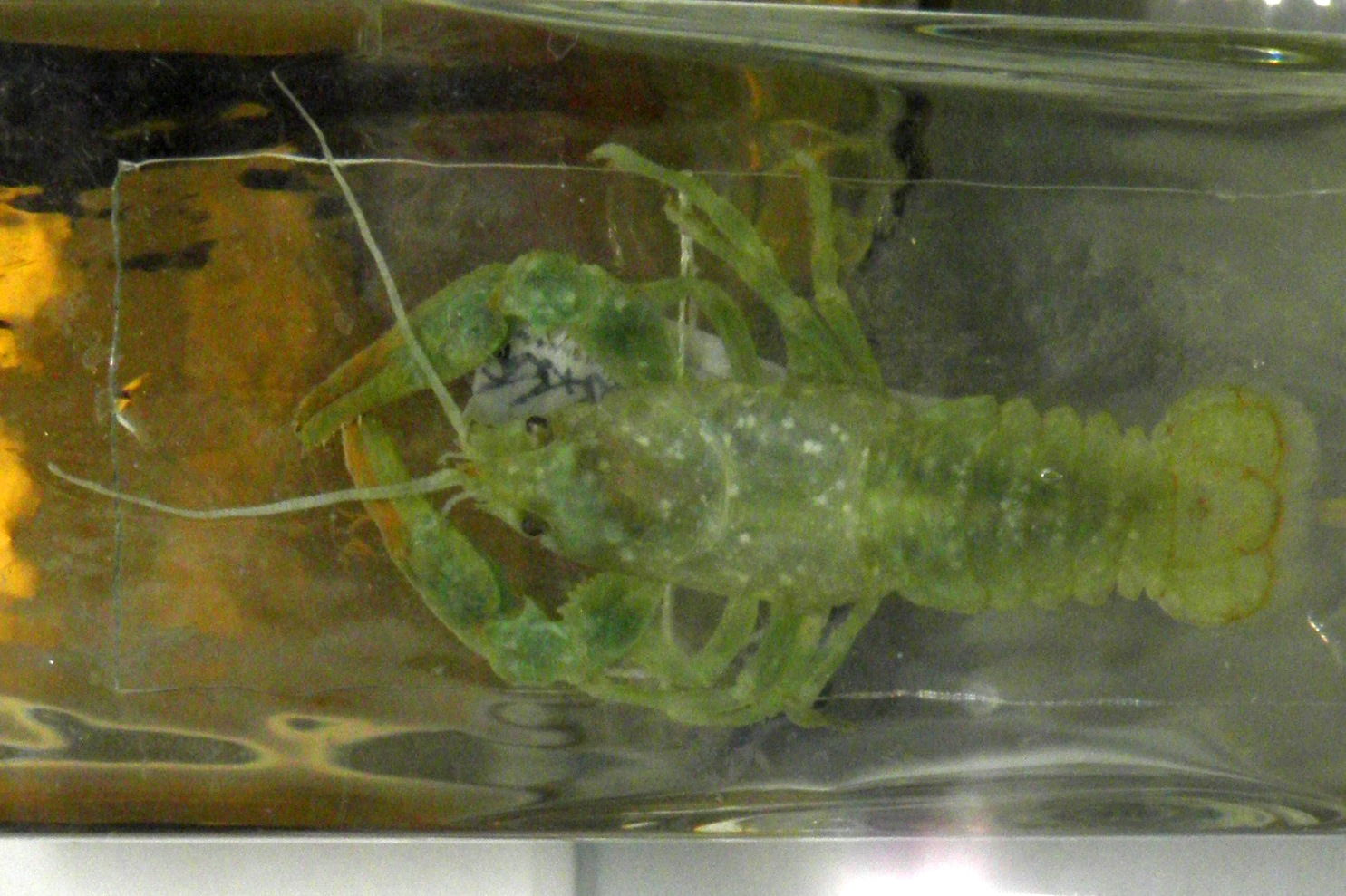
Cambaroides dauricus

Cambaroides is a genus of freshwater crayfish from eastern Asia (eastern Russia, northeastern China, Korean Peninsula and Japan). Together with Pontastacus, they are the only crayfish native to Asia. Cambaroides contains about six species:

== Species ==
- Cambaroides dauricus (Pallas, 1772)
- Cambaroides japonicus (De Haan, 1841)
- Cambaroides koshewnikowi Birstein & Vinogradov, 1934
- Cambaroides sachalinensis (De Haan, 1841)
- Cambaroides schrenckii (Kessler, 1874)
- Cambaroides similis (Koelbel, 1892)
- Cambaroides wladiwostokiensis Birstein & Vinogradov, 1934
