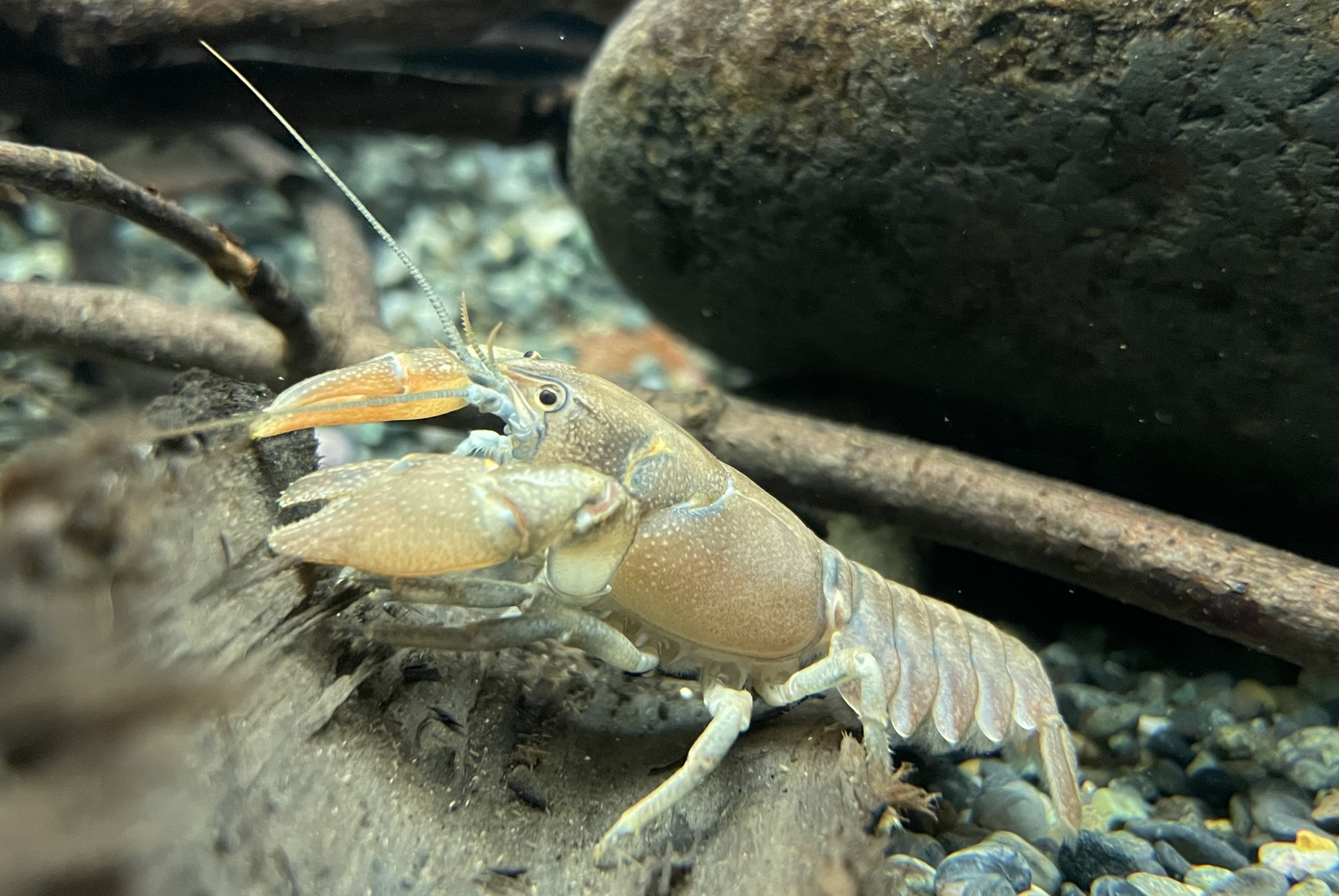
- Cambaroides japonicus
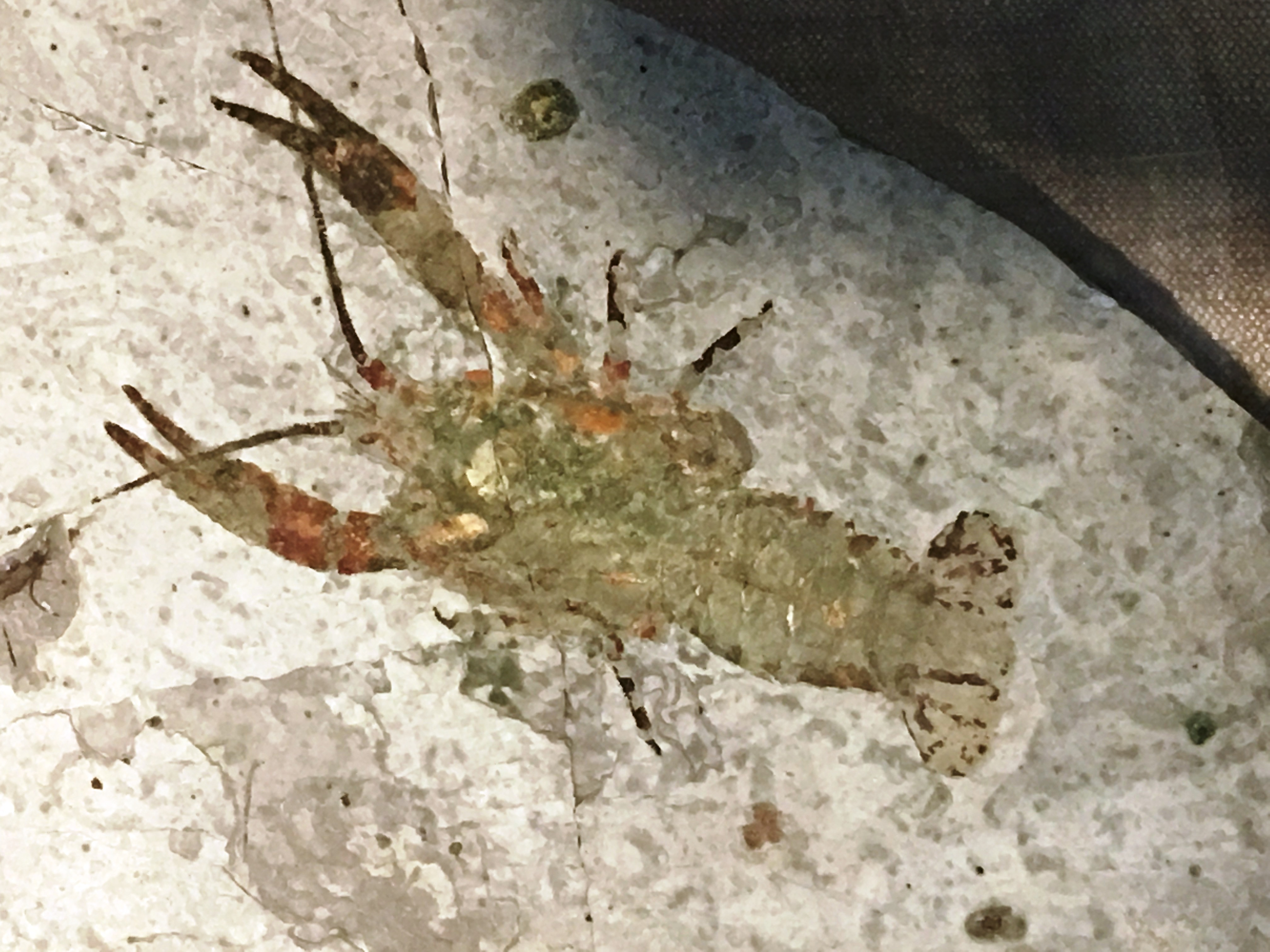
- †Palaeocambarus

Scientific classification
- Domain: Eukaryota
- Kingdom: Animalia
- Phylum: Arthropoda
- Class: Malacostraca
- Order: Decapoda
- Suborder: Pleocyemata
- Superfamily: Astacoidea
- Family: Cambaroididae; Villalobos, 1955

Genera
- Cambaroides; †Palaeocambarus

= Cambaroididae =

Cambaroididae Temporal range: Barremian–Recent

Family of crayfish

Cambaroididae is a family of crayfish. It contains two genera, the extant Cambaroides, known from a number of species living in East Asia, and the extinct Palaeocambarus, known from the Early Cretaceous (Barremian-Aptian) Yixian Formation of China.
