= List of Canthon species =

This is a list of 167 species in the genus Canthon, tumblebugs.

== Canthon species ==
- Canthon aberrans (Harold, 1868)^{c g}
- Canthon acutiformis Balthasar, 1939^{c g}
- Canthon acutoides Schmidt, 1922^{c g}
- Canthon acutus Harold, 1868^{c g}
- Canthon aequinoctialis Harold, 1868^{c g}
- Canthon angularis Harold, 1868^{c g}
- Canthon angustatus Harold, 1867^{c g}
- Canthon antoniomartinezi Rivera-Cervantes & Halffter, 1999^{c g}
- Canthon ateuchiceps Bates, 1887^{c g}
- Canthon auricollis Redtenbacher, 1867^{c g}
- Canthon balteatus Boheman, 1858^{c g}
- Canthon bicolor Castelnau, 1840^{c g}
- Canthon bimaculatus Schmidt, 1922^{c g}
- Canthon bisignatus Balthasar, 1939^{i c g}
- Canthon bispinus (Germar, 1824)^{c g}
- Canthon brunneus Schmidt, 1922^{c g}
- Canthon brunnipennis Schmidt, 1922^{c g}
- Canthon caelius Bates, 1887^{c g}
- Canthon callosus Harold, 1868^{c g}
- Canthon candens (Gistel, 1857)^{c g}
- Canthon carbonarius Harold, 1868^{c g}
- Canthon chalcites (Haldeman, 1843)^{i c g b}
- Canthon championi Bates, 1887^{c g}
- Canthon chiriguano Martinez & Halffter, 1972^{c g}
- Canthon cinctellus (Germar, 1824)^{c g}
- Canthon circulatus Harold, 1868^{c g}
- Canthon coahuilensis Howden, 1966^{i c g}
- Canthon cobosi Pereira & Martinez, 1960^{c g}
- Canthon coeruleicollis Blanchard, 1846^{c g}
- Canthon coerulescens Schmidt, 1922^{c g}
- Canthon coloratus Schmidt, 1922^{c g}
- Canthon columbianus Schmidt, 1920^{c g}
- Canthon corporaali Balthasar, 1939^{c g}
- Canthon corruscus Castelnau, 1840^{c g}
- Canthon curvipes Harold, 1868^{c g}
- Canthon curvodilatatus Schmidt, 1920^{c g}
- Canthon cyanellus Leconte, 1859^{i c g b}
- Canthon daguerrei Martinez, 1951^{c g}
- Canthon delgadoi Rivera-Cervantes & Halffter, 1999^{c g}
- Canthon delicatulus Balthasar, 1939^{c g}
- Canthon deloyai Rivera-Cervantes & Halffter, 1999^{c g}
- Canthon delpontei Martinez & Halffter, 1972^{c g}
- Canthon denticulatus Schmidt, 1922^{c g}
- Canthon dentiger Harold, 1868^{c g}
- Canthon deplanatus Harold, 1868^{c g}
- Canthon depressipennis Leconte, 1859^{i c g b}
- Canthon deyrollei Harold, 1868^{c g}
- Canthon dives Harold, 1868^{c g}
- Canthon divinator (Gistel, 1857)^{c g}
- Canthon doesburgi Huijbregts, 2010^{g}
- Canthon ebeneus (Say, 1823)^{c g}
- Canthon ebenus (Say, 1823)^{i g b}
- Canthon edentulus Harold, 1868^{c g}
- Canthon edmondsi Rivera-Cervantes & Halffter, 1999^{c g}
- Canthon enkerlini (Martinez, Halffter & Halffter, 1964)^{c g}
- Canthon euryscelis Bates, 1887^{c g}
- Canthon fallax Harold, 1868^{c g}
- Canthon femoralis (Chevrolat, 1834)^{i c g}
- Canthon forcipatus Harold, 1868^{c g}
- Canthon formosus Harold, 1868^{c g}
- Canthon forreri Bates, 1887^{i c g}
- Canthon fulgidus Redtenbacher, 1867^{c g}
- Canthon fuscipes Erichson, 1847^{c g}
- Canthon gemellatus Erichson, 1847^{c g}
- Canthon haroldi Nunes, Nunes & Vaz-de-Mello, 2020
- Canthon hartmanni Howden & Gill, 1987^{c g}
- Canthon helleri Schmidt, 1922^{c g}
- Canthon heyrovskyi Balthasar, 1939^{c g}
- Canthon histrio Lepeletier de Saint Fargeau & Audinet-Serville, 1828^{g}
- Canthon honsi Balthasar, 1939^{c g}
- Canthon humboldti Solis & Kohlmann, 2002^{c g}
- Canthon humectus (Say, 1832)^{i c g b}
- Canthon ibarragrassoi (Martinez, 1952)^{c g}
- Canthon imitator Brown, 1946^{i c g b}
- Canthon indigaceus LECONTE, 1866^{i c g b}
- Canthon integricollis Schaeffer, 1915^{c g}
- Canthon inusitatus Kohlmann & Solis, 2006^{c g}
- Canthon janthinus Blanchard, 1846^{c g}
- Canthon juvencus Harold, 1868^{c g}
- Canthon lafargei (Drapiez, 1820)^{c g}
- Canthon laminatus Balthasar, 1939^{c g}
- Canthon lamprimus Bates, 1887^{c g}
- Canthon lamproderes Redtenbacher, 1867^{c g}
- Canthon latipes Blanchard, 1843^{c g}
- Canthon lecontei Harold, 1868^{i c g b}
- Canthon leechi Martinez, Halffter & Halffter, 1964^{c g}
- Canthon lituratus (Germar, 1813)^{c g}
- Canthon lividus Blanchard, 1846^{c g}
- Canthon lucreciae Halffter & Halffter, 2009^{g}
- Canthon lunatus Schmidt, 1922^{c g}
- Canthon luteicollis Erichson, 1847^{c g}
- Canthon machadoi (Martínez & Pereira, 1967)
- Canthon maldonadoi Martinez, 1951^{c g}
- Canthon manantlanensis Rivera-Cervantes & Halffter, 1999^{c g}
- Canthon marmoratus Pereira & Martinez, 1956^{c g}
- Canthon matthewsi Martinez & Halffter, 1972^{c g}
- Canthon melancholicus Harold, 1868^{c g}
- Canthon melanus Robinson, 1948^{i c g b}
- Canthon meridionalis Martinez, Halffter & Halffter, 1964^{c g}
- Canthon mixtus Robinson, 1948^{i c g}
- Canthon modestus Harold, 1867^{c g}
- Canthon monilifer Blanchard, 1846^{c g}
- Canthon montanus Rivera-Cervantes & Halffter, 1999^{c g}
- Canthon moroni Rivera-Cervantes & Halffter, 1999^{c g}
- Canthon morsei Howden, 1966^{c g}
- Canthon mutabilis Lucas, 1857^{c g}
- Canthon muticus Harold, 1867^{c g}
- Canthon nigripennis Lansberge, 1874^{c g}
- Canthon nyctelius Bates, 1887^{c g}
- Canthon obliquus Horn, 1894^{i c g}
- Canthon obscuriellus Schmidt, 1922^{c g}
- Canthon octodentatus Schmidt, 1920^{c g}
- Canthon oliverioi Pereira & Martinez, 1956^{c g}
- Canthon orfilai Martinez, 1949^{c g}
- Canthon ornatus Redtenbacher, 1867^{c g}
- Canthon pacificus Rivera-Cervantes & Halffter, 1999^{c g}
- Canthon pallidus Schmidt, 1922^{c g}
- Canthon pauxillus Harold, 1883^{c g}
- Canthon perplexus Le Conte, 1847^{g}
- Canthon perseverans Matthews, 1966^{c g}
- Canthon pilularius (Linnaeus, 1758)^{i c g b} (common tumblebug)
- Canthon piluliformis Blanchard, 1846^{c g}
- Canthon plagiatus Harold, 1880^{c g}
- Canthon planus Lucas, 1857^{c g}
- Canthon podagricus Harold, 1868^{c g}
- Canthon politus Harold, 1868^{c g}
- Canthon praticola Leconte, 1859^{i c g b}
- Canthon principalis (Burmeister, 1873)^{c g}
- Canthon probus (Germar, 1824)^{i c g}
- Canthon punctatus Schmidt, 1922^{c g}
- Canthon puncticollis LeConte, 1866^{i c g}
- Canthon quadratus Blanchard, 1846^{c g}
- Canthon quadriguttatus (Olivier, 1789)^{c g}
- Canthon quadripunctatus Redtenbacher, 1867^{c g}
- Canthon quinquemaculatus Castelnau, 1840^{c g}
- Canthon reichei Felsche, 1910^{c g}
- Canthon reyesi (Martinez & Halffter, 1972)^{c g}
- Canthon rubrescens Blanchard, 1846^{c g}
- Canthon rutilans Castelnau, 1840^{c g}
- Canthon rzedowskii Rivera-Cervantes & Halffter, 1999^{c g}
- Canthon semiopacus Harold, 1868^{c g}
- Canthon septemmaculatus (Latreille, 1812)^{c g}
- Canthon sericatus Schmidt, 1922^{c g}
- Canthon signifer Harold, 1868^{c g}
- Canthon silvaticus Solis & Kohlmann, 2002^{c g}
- Canthon simplex Leconte, 1857^{i c g b}
- Canthon simulans Martinez, 1950^{c g}
- Canthon smaragdulus (Fabricius, 1781)^{c g}
- Canthon sordidus Harold, 1868^{c g}
- Canthon splendidus Schmidt, 1922^{c g}
- Canthon staigi Pereira, 1953^{c g}
- Canthon steinheili Harold, 1880^{c g}
- Canthon subcyaneus Erichson, 1848^{c g}
- Canthon subhyalinus Harold, 1867^{c g}
- Canthon substriatus Harold, 1868^{c g}
- Canthon terciae Nunes, Nunes & Vaz-de-Mello, 2020
- Canthon tetraodon Blanchard, 1846^{c g}
- Canthon triangularis (Drury, 1770)^{c g}
- Canthon unicolor Blanchard, 1846^{c g}
- Canthon variabilis Martinez, 1948^{c g}
- Canthon vazquezae Martinez, Halffter & Halffter, 1964^{c g}
- Canthon velutinus Harold, 1868^{c g}
- Canthon viduus Harold, 1868^{c g}
- Canthon vigilans Leconte, 1858^{i c g b} (vigilant dung beetle)
- Canthon violaceus (Olivier, 1789)^{c g}
- Canthon virens (Mannerheim, 1829)^{c g}
- Canthon viridis (Palisot de Beauvois, 1805)^{i c g b}
- Canthon vulcanoae Pereira & Martinez, 1956^{c g}
- Canthon xanthopus Blanchard, 1846
- Canthon zuninoi Rivera-Cervantes & Halffter, 1999^{c g}

== Selected former species ==
- Canthon sulcatus Castelnau, 1840^{c g}

Data sources: i = ITIS, c = Catalogue of Life, g = GBIF, b = Bugguide.net
