= Sylvicanthon proseni =

Scientific classification
- Kingdom: Animalia
- Phylum: Arthropoda
- Clade: Pancrustacea
- Class: Insecta
- Order: Coleoptera
- Suborder: Polyphaga
- Infraorder: Scarabaeiformia
- Family: Scarabaeidae
- Genus: Sylvicanthon
- Species: S. proseni

Binomial name
- Sylvicanthon proseni (Martinez, 1949)

Synonyms
- Glaphyrocanthon proseni Martinez, 1949

Species of beetle

Sylvicanthon proseni is a species of beetle of the family Scarabaeidae. It is widespread in the Amazon Basin.

== Description ==
Adults reach a length of about 9.8–15 mm (0.39–0.59 in). The head, pronotum, elytra, pygidium, and underside (including the ventral surface of femora) with a diffuse shine. The head, pronotum and pygidium have a blue, purple or greenish reflections. In some specimens, the pronotum has a strong olive green shine. The elytra are dark and have a silky aspect, usually dark blue or purple, but in some specimens, they are totally black or have greenish reflections. The meso- and metafemora are dark brown and usually with greenish reflections.

== Taxonomy ==
It was treated as a synonym of Sylvicanthon aequinoctialis since 1977, but was reinstated as a valid species in 2018.

== Etymology ==
The species is named after the Argentinian entomologist Alberto F. Prosen.
