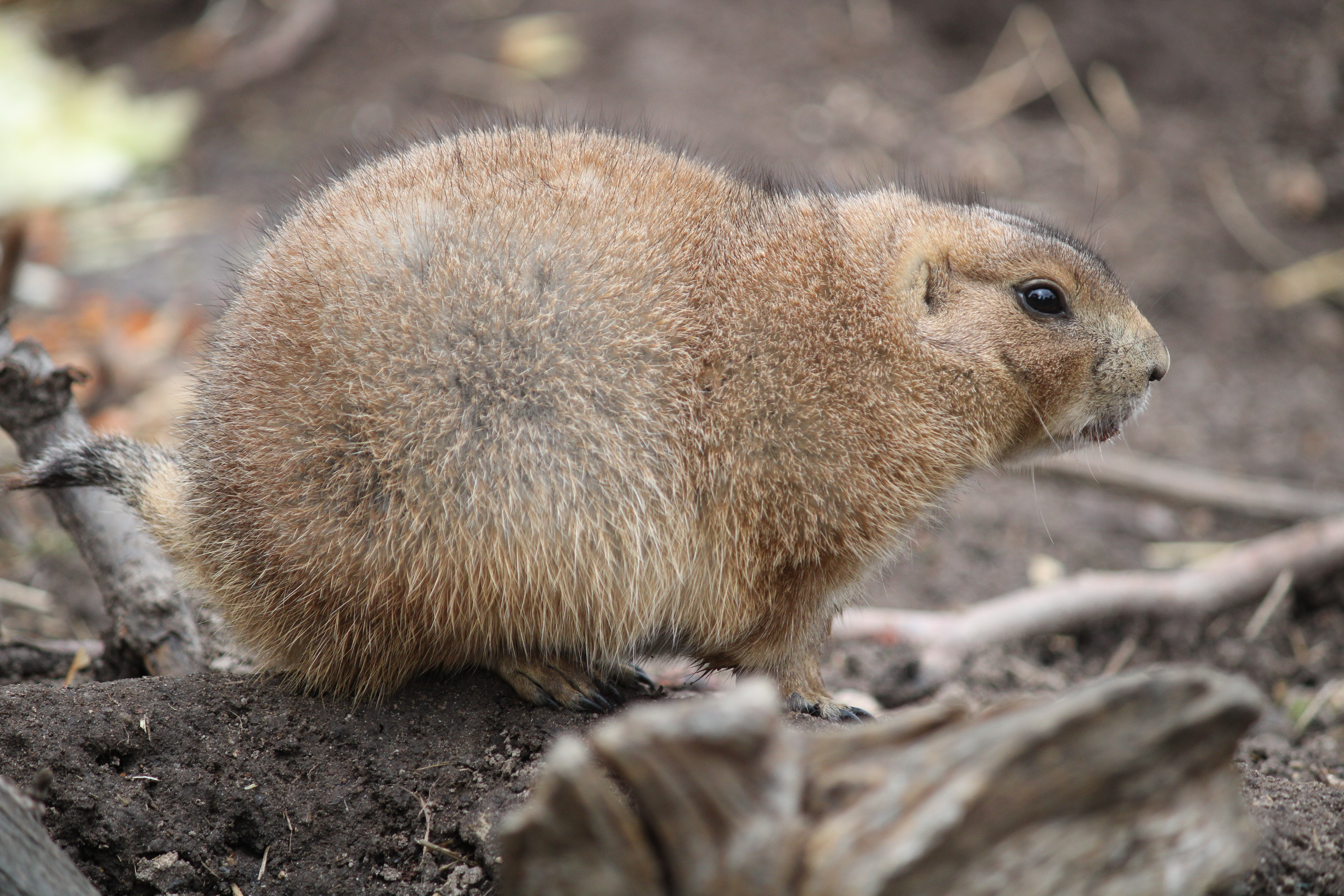
- At Copenhagen Zoo

Conservation status
- Least Concern (IUCN 3.1)

- Apparently Secure (NatureServe)

Scientific classification
- Kingdom: Animalia
- Phylum: Chordata
- Class: Mammalia
- Order: Rodentia
- Family: Sciuridae
- Genus: Cynomys
- Species: C. ludovicianus

Binomial name
- Cynomys ludovicianus (Ord, 1815)
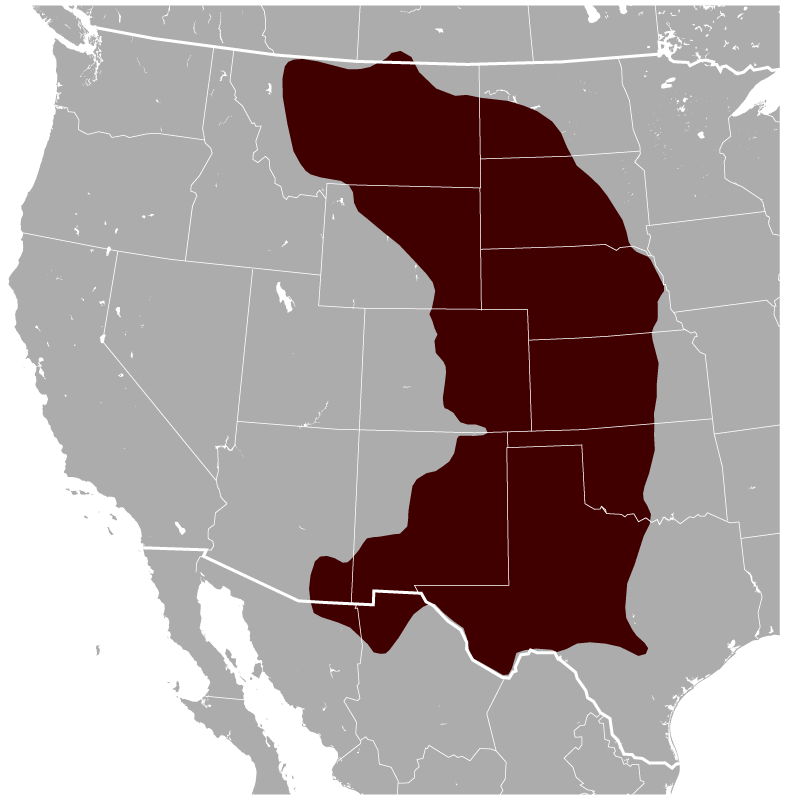
- Black-tailed prairie dog range

= Black-tailed prairie dog =

Species of rodent

The black-tailed prairie dog (Cynomys ludovicianus) is a rodent of the family Sciuridae (the squirrels) found in the Great Plains of North America from about the United States–Canada border to the United States–Mexico border. Unlike some other prairie dogs, these animals do not truly hibernate. The black-tailed prairie dog can be seen above ground in midwinter. A black-tailed prairie dog town in Texas was reported to cover 25,000 mi^{2} (64,000 km^{2}) and included 400,000,000 individuals. Prior to habitat destruction, the species may have been the most abundant prairie dog in central North America. It was one of two prairie dogs described by the Lewis and Clark Expedition in the journals and diaries of their expedition.

== Description ==
Black-tailed prairie dogs are generally tan in color, with lighter-colored bellies. They may have color variation in their pelt, such as dark fur on their back in black and brown tones. Their tails have black tips, from which their name is derived. Adults can weigh from 1.5 to 3.0 lb (0.68 to 1.36 kg), males are typically heavier than females. Body length is normally from 14 to 17 in (36 to 43 cm), with a 3-to-4-inch (7.6 to 10.2 cm) tail. The black-tailed have black long claws used for digging in the ground. The body of the black-tailed prairie dog is compact, and the ears are quite small and close to the head.

== Distribution ==
The historic range of the black-tailed prairie dog was from southern Saskatchewan and Alberta to Chihuahua, Mexico, and included portions of Montana, North Dakota, South Dakota, Wyoming, Colorado, Nebraska, Kansas, Oklahoma, Texas, Arizona, and New Mexico. As of 2007, black-tailed prairie dogs occur across most of their historic range, excluding Arizona; however, their occupied acreage and populations are well below historic levels.

== Habits ==
Black-tailed prairie dogs are diurnal. Above-ground activity is reduced when rain or snow is falling and during days when the temperature exceeds 100 °F (38 °C). During the winter months, black-tailed prairie dogs do not fully hibernate. They continue to leave the burrow to forage, but will enter a state of torpor at night to conserve energy. Torpor is categorized by a drop in metabolism, heart rate and respiration similar to hibernation, but is involuntary and shorter in duration. On average, black-tailed prairie dogs will lose twenty percent of their body weight during the fall and winter seasons when they go through bouts of torpor. As winter progresses, the amount of time spent in torpor increases. Between different colonies the overall time spent in torpor varies, independent of prairie dog body mass. This may be due to weather during the previous growing season. As black-tailed prairie dogs receive most of their water from their diet, in years with poor rainfall, the black-tailed prairie dogs spend more time in torpor.

== Habitat ==
Black-tailed prairie dogs are native to grassland habitats in North America. They inhabit shortgrass prairie, mixed-grass prairie, sagebrush steppe, and desert grassland.

Habitat preferences for the black-tailed prairie dog are influenced by vegetative cover type, slope, soil type, and amount of rainfall. Their foraging and burrowing activities influence environmental heterogeneity, hydrology, nutrient cycling, biodiversity, landscape architecture, and plant succession in grassland habitats.

=== Landscape-scale habitat characteristics ===
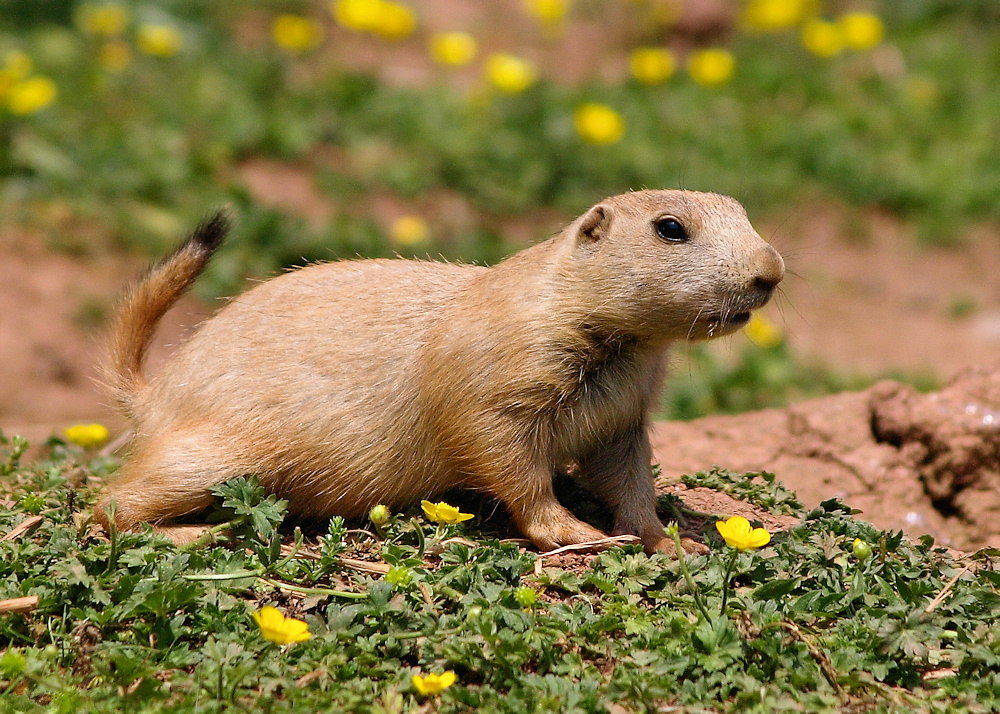
At Paignton Zoo, Devon, England

Black-tailed prairie dogs inhabit grasslands, including short- and mixed-grass prairie, sagebrush steppe, and desert grasslands. Shortgrass prairies dominated by buffalo grass (Buchloe dactyloides), blue grama (Bouteloua gracilis), and western wheatgrass (Pascopyron smithii), and mixed-grass prairies that have been grazed by native and non-native herbivores are their preferred habitat. Slopes of 2% to 5% and vegetation heights between 3 and 5 in (8 and 13 cm) are optimal for detecting predators and facilitating communication.

In the Great Plains region, black-tailed prairie dog colonies commonly occur near rivers and creeks. Of 86 colonies located in Mellette County, South Dakota, 30 were located on benches or terraces adjacent to a creek or floodplain, 30 occurred in rolling hills with a slope more than 5°, 20 were in flat areas, and six were in badland areas. The slopes of playa lakes in the Texas Panhandle and surrounding regions are used as habitat for the black-tailed prairie dog. Colonies in Phillips County, Montana, were often associated with reservoirs, cattle salting grounds, and other areas affected by humans.

Black-tailed prairie dogs tolerate "high degrees" of disturbance over long periods of time. New colonies are rarely created on rangeland in "good" to "excellent" condition; however, continuously, long-term, heavily grazed land reduces habitat quality due to soil erosion. Black-tailed prairie dogs may colonize heavily grazed sites, but do not necessarily specialize in colonizing overgrazed areas. Overgrazing may occur subsequent to their colonization. Black-tailed prairie dogs were associated with areas intensively grazed by livestock and/or areas where topsoil had been disturbed by human activities in sagebrush-grassland habitat on the Charles M. Russell National Wildlife Refuge and Fort Belknap Agency, Montana. Roads and cattle trails were found in 150 of 154 black-tailed prairie dog colonies, and colonies were located significantly closer to livestock water developments and homestead sites than randomly located points.

=== Soil ===
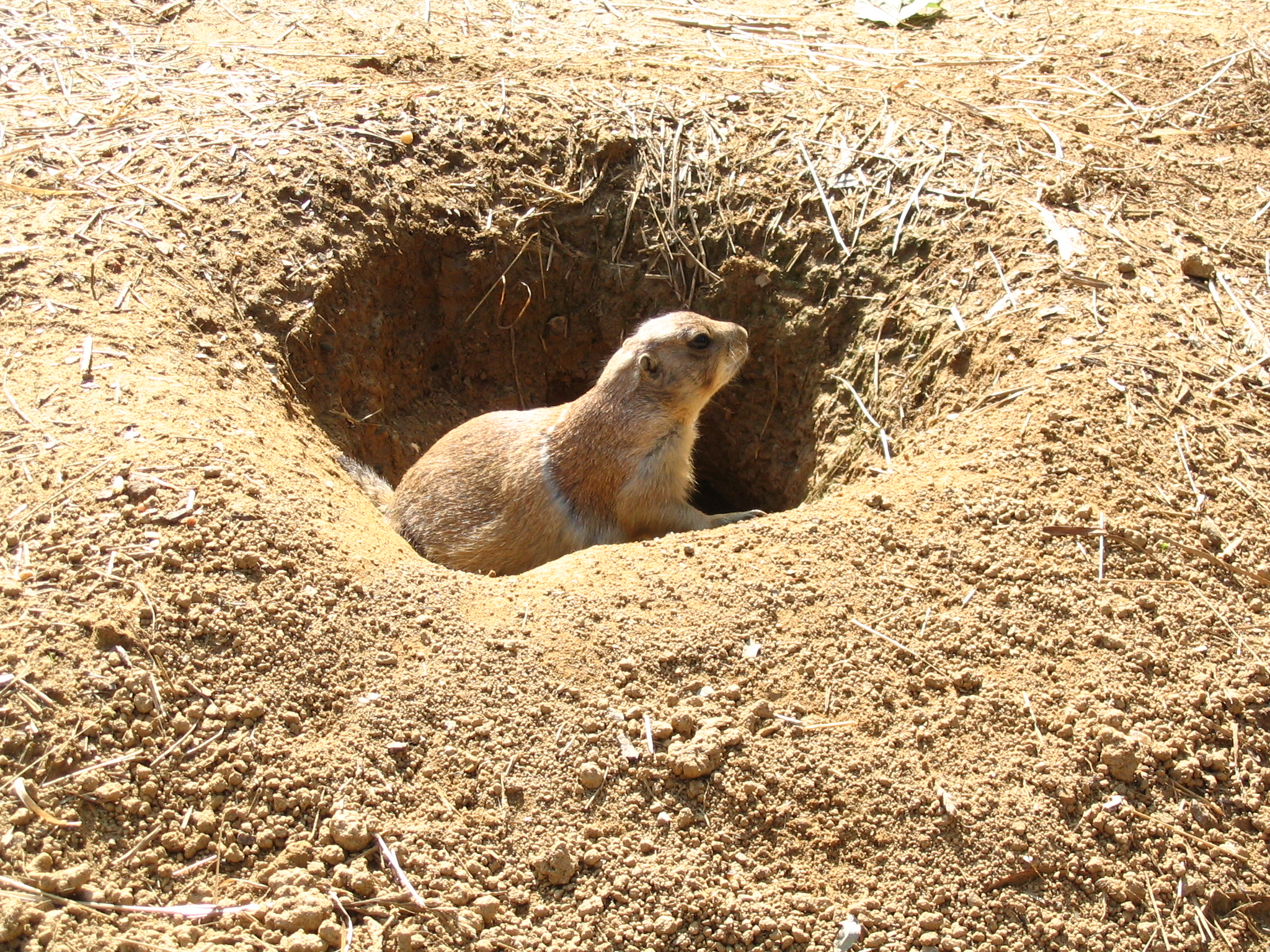
At the National Zoo in Washington, DC

Black-tailed prairie dog distribution is not limited by soil type, but by indirect effects of soil texture on moisture and vegetation. Colonies occur in many types of soil, including deep, alluvial soils with medium to fine textures, and occasionally gravel. Soil not prone to collapsing or flooding is preferred. Though they do not select specific types of soil to dig burrows, silty loam clay soils are best for tunnel construction. Surface soil textures in colonies near Fort Collins, Colorado, varied from sandy loam to sandy clay loam in the top 6 in (15 cm), with a sandy clay loam subsoil. In northern latitudes, colonies commonly occur on south aspects due to the dominance of grasses over shrubs and increased solar radiation during winter. Burrows usually occur on slopes more than 10°.

Black-tailed prairie dogs mix the soil horizons by raising soil from deeper layers to the surface. This may significantly affect the texture and composition of soil at different layers. Their feces, urine, and carcasses also affect soil characteristics.

=== Home range and population density ===
The home range and territorial boundaries of black-tailed prairie dogs are determined by the area occupied by an individual coterie. Coteries typically occupy about 1 acre (0.40 ha).

Population density and growth are influenced by habitat quality and are restricted by topographic barriers, soil structure, tall vegetation, and social conditions. Urbanization and other types of human development may restrict colony size and spatial distribution. Most plains habitats support at least 13 black-tailed prairie dogs/ha.

=== Cover requirements ===
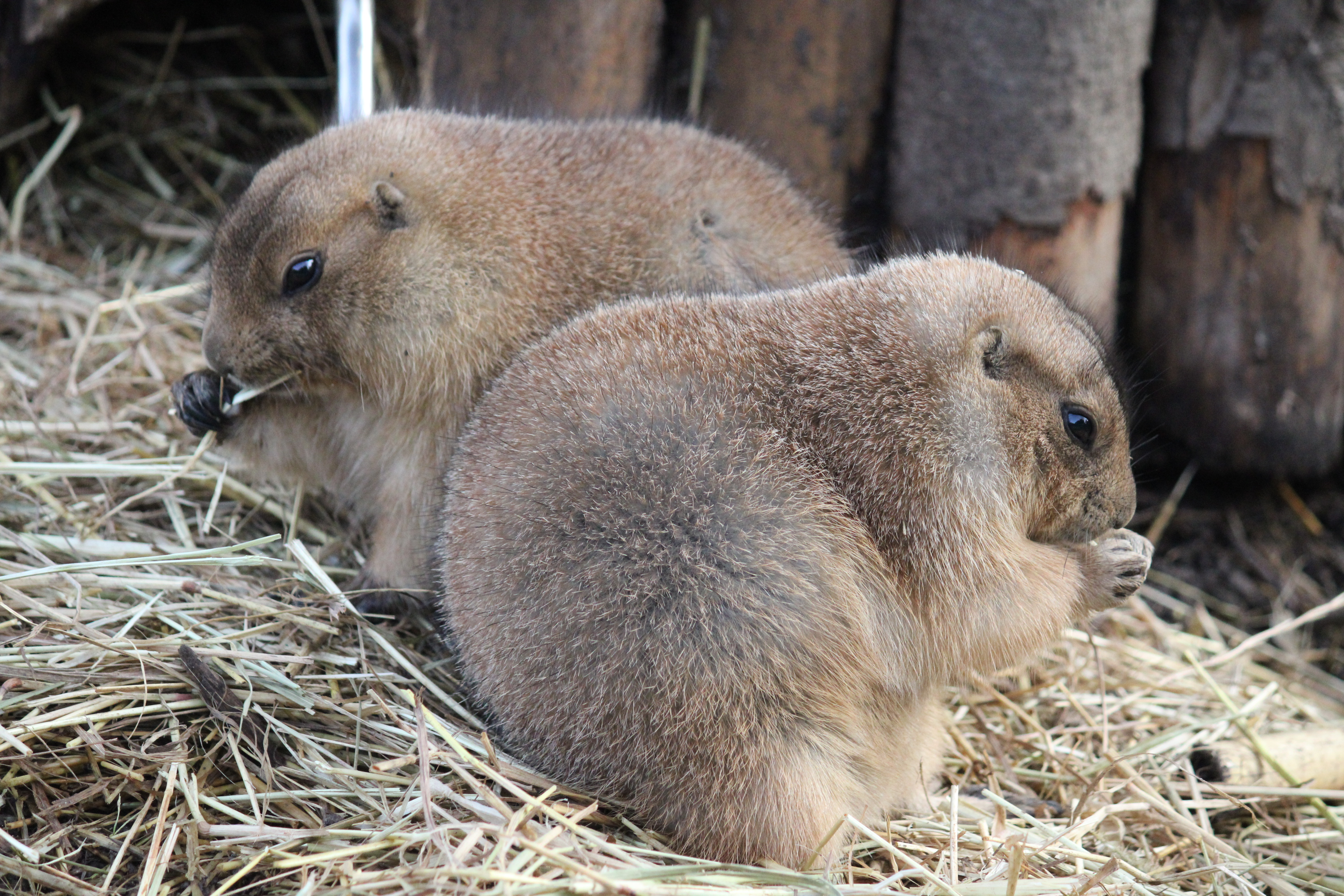
Two adults

Burrows created by black-tailed prairie dogs serve as refuges from the external environment and are one of the most important features of their colonies. Burrows are used for breeding, rearing young, and hiding from predators, and are maintained from generation to generation, and serve as stabilizers on the physical and social aspects of the colony. Black-tailed prairie dog nests are located underground in burrows and are composed of fine, dried grass. Nest material is collected throughout the year by both sexes and all age classes. Tunnel depths in central Oklahoma were typically 50–60 in (1,270–1,524 mm) deep. Most colonies contain 20 to 57 burrows/acre.

The three types of burrow entrances are: dome mounds, rimmed crater mounds, and entrances without structures around them. Entrance features may prevent flooding and/or aid in ventilation. Dome mounds consist of loosely packed subterranean soil spread widely around the entrance of the burrow, and tend to be vegetated by prostrate forbs. Rimmed crater mounds are cone-shaped and constructed of humus, litter, uprooted vegetation, and mineral soil. Black-tailed prairie dogs compact the soil of these mounds with their noses, creating poor sites for seedling establishment. Rimmed crater mounds may be used as wallowing sites for American bison. Burrow entrances without structures around them are usually located on slopes more than 10°. The density of burrow openings depends on both substrate and duration of occupation of an area.

Vegetation heights between 3 and 5 in (8 and 13 cm) and a slope of 2° to 5° are optimal for detecting predators and facilitating communication among black-tailed prairie dogs. Grazing cattle keep vegetation short in the vicinity of colonies, reducing susceptibility to predators and potentially expanding colony size. Black-tailed prairie dogs were rarely seen feeding more than 16 ft (5 m) from colony edges in Wind Cave National Park.

== Diet ==
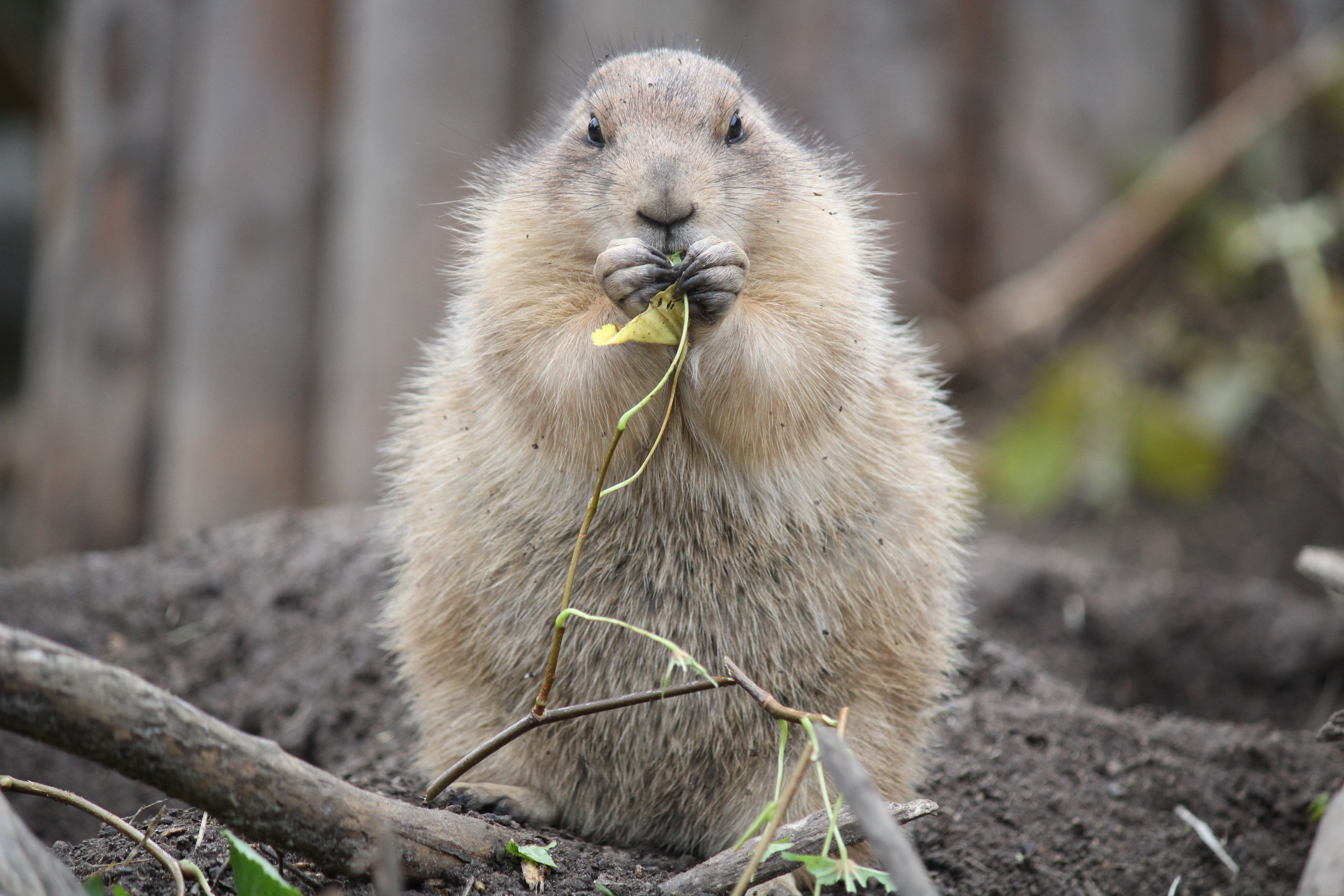
Cynomys ludovicianus eating a leaf

Black-tailed prairie dogs are selective opportunists, preferring certain phenological stages or types of vegetation according to their needs. When forage is stressed by grazing, drought, or herbicides, they change their diets quickly. Grasses are preferred over forbs, and may comprise more than 75% of their diets, especially during summer. Western wheatgrass, buffalo grass, blue grama and sedges (Carex spp.) are preferred during spring and summer. Scarlet globemallow (Sphaeralcea coccinea) and Russian thistle (Salsola kali) are preferred during late summer and fall, but are sought out during every season. During winter, plains prickly pear (Opuntia polyacantha), Russian thistle, and underground roots are preferred. Shrubs such as rabbitbrush (Chrysothamnus spp.), winterfat (Krascheninnikovia lanata), saltbush (Atriplex spp.), and sagebrush (Artemisia spp.) are also commonly eaten. Water, which is generally not available on the short-grass prairie, is obtained from vegetation such as plains prickly pear. Koford estimated one black-tailed prairie dog eats about 7 lb (3 kg) of herbage per month during summer. Cutworms, grasshoppers, and old or fresh American bison scat are occasionally eaten. For a detailed list of foods eaten by black-tailed prairie dogs by month, and ratings of those foods' forage value to cattle and sheep, see. For a complete list of vegetation preferred by the black-tailed prairie dog, see.

== Social organization ==
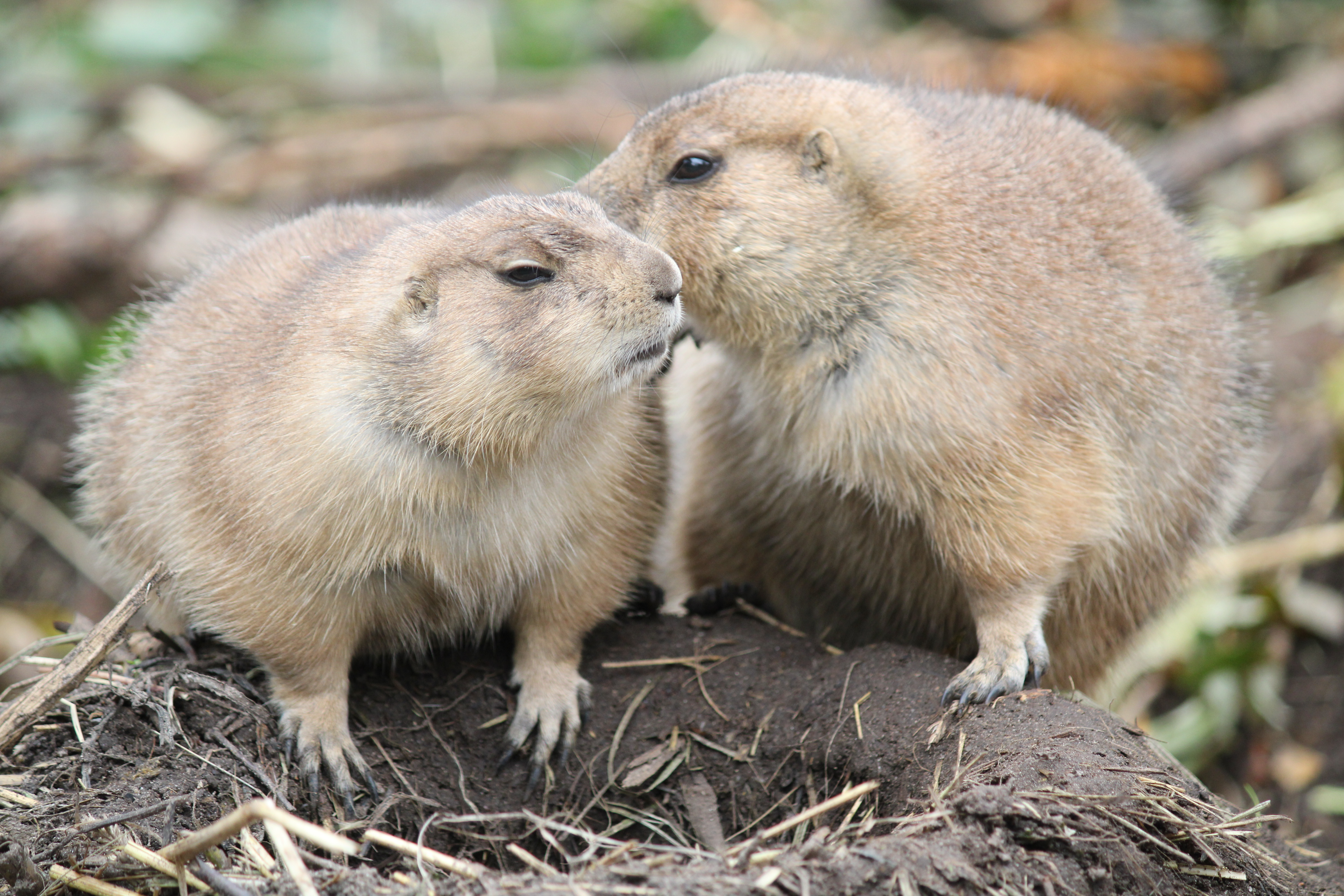
Two black-tailed prairie dogs grooming themselves

Black-tailed prairie dogs live in colonies. Colony size may range from five to thousands of individuals, and may be subdivided into two or more wards, based on topographic features, such as hills. Wards are usually subdivided into two or more coteries, which are composed of aggregates of highly territorial, harem-polygynous social groups. Individuals within coteries are amicable with each other and hostile towards outside individuals. At the beginning of the breeding season, a coterie is typically composed of one adult male, three to four adult females, and several yearlings and juveniles of both sexes. After the breeding season and prior to dispersal of juveniles, coterie size increases.

=== Dispersal ===
Reasons for dispersal include new vegetative growth at colony peripheries, shortage of unrelated females in a coterie, harassment of females by juveniles, and probably an innate genetic mechanism responding to increased density within a colony. Males typically leave the natal territory 12 to 14 months after weaning, during May and June, but dispersal may occur throughout the year. Females generally remain in their natal coterie territories for their lifetimes. Intercolony dispersers moved an average distance of 1.5 mi (2.4 km) from their natal site. Roads and trails may facilitate black-tailed prairie dog dispersal.

=== Hearing ===
Black-tailed prairie dogs have sensory adaptions for avoiding predators. Black-tailed prairie dogs have very sensitive hearing at low frequencies that allows them to detect predators early, especially while in their burrows. Black-tailed prairie dog hearing can range from 29 Hz to 26 kHz, and can hear as low as 4 Hz.

=== Communication ===
Constantine Slobodchikoff and others assert that prairie dogs use a sophisticated system of vocal communication to describe specific predators. According to them, prairie dog calls contain specific information as to what the predator is, how big it is, and how fast it is approaching. These have been described as a form of grammar. According to Slobodchikoff, these calls, with their individuality in response to a specific predator, imply prairie dogs have highly developed cognitive abilities. He also asserts prairie dogs have calls for things that are not predators to them. This is cited as evidence that the animals have a very descriptive language and have calls for any potential threat.

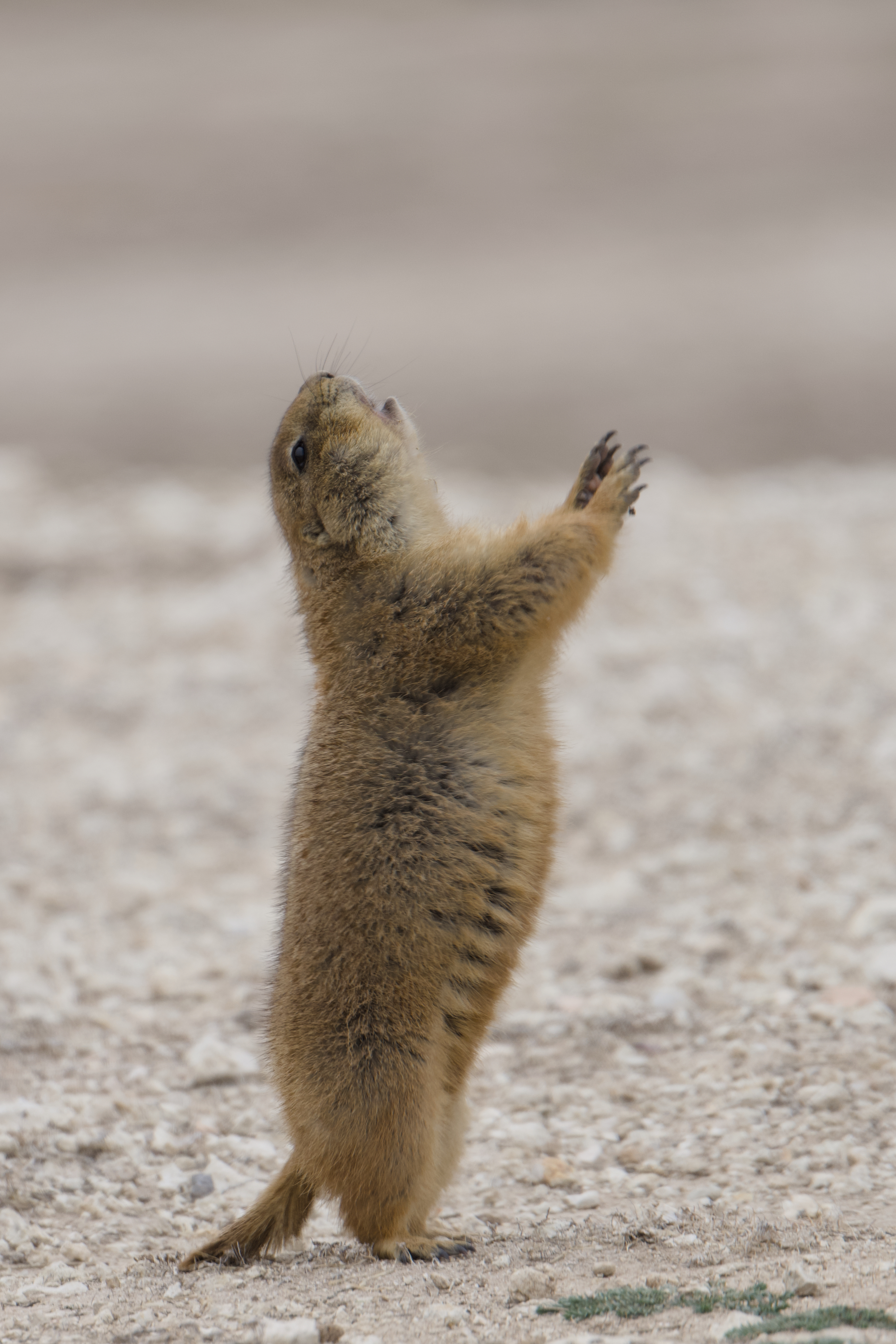
Black-tailed prairie dog performing a jump-yip.

Debate exists over whether the alarm calling of prairie dogs is selfish or altruistic. Prairie dogs possibly alarm others to the presence of a predator so they can protect themselves. However, the calls possibly are meant to cause confusion and panic in the groups and cause the others to be more conspicuous to the predator than the caller. Studies of black-tailed prairie dogs suggest alarm calling is a form of kin selection, as a prairie dog's call alerts both offspring and kin of indirect descent, such as cousins, nephews, and nieces. Prairie dogs with kin close by called more often than those without. In addition, the caller may be trying to make itself more noticeable to the predator. However, a predator seems to have difficulty determining which prairie dog is making the call due to its "ventriloquistic" nature. Also, when a prairie dog makes a call, the others seem not to run into the burrows, but stand on the mounds to see where the predator is, making themselves visible to the predator.

Perhaps the most conspicuous prairie dog communication is the territorial call or "jump-yip" display. A prairie dog will stretch the length of its body vertically and throw its forefeet into the air while making a call. A jump-yip from one prairie dog causes others nearby to do the same. The instigator of the jump-yip 'wave' uses the jump-yip to assess the vigilance or watchfulness of others in the colony - a longer jump-yip wave indicates watchful neighbors and leads to increased foraging by the instigator.

== Reproduction and development ==
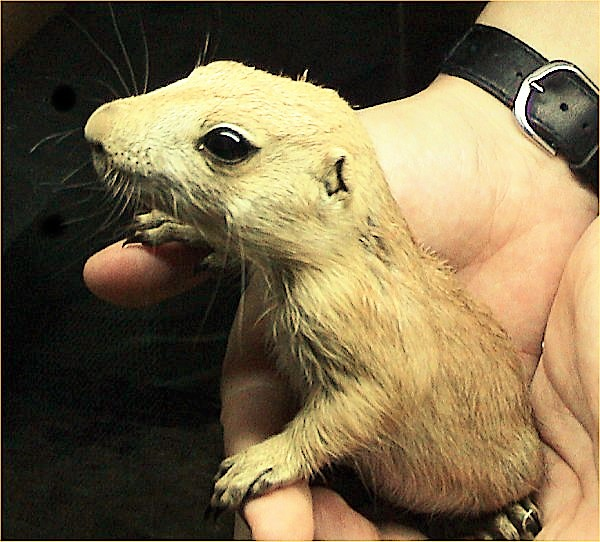
Six-week-old black-tailed prairie dog

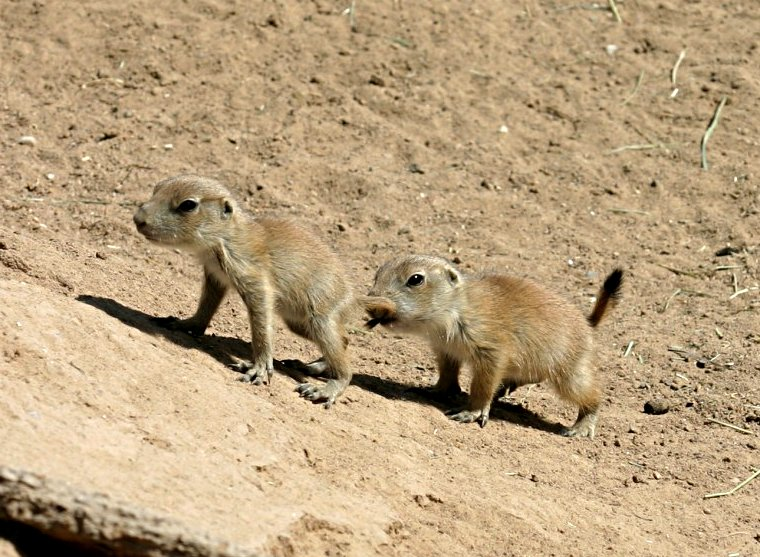
Two juveniles at the Rio Grande Zoo

Age of first reproduction, pregnancy rate, litter size, juvenile growth rate, and first-year survival of the black-tailed prairie dog vary depending on food availability.

=== Mating ===
Minimum breeding age for the black-tailed prairie dog is usually two years, but yearlings may breed if space and food are abundant. In Wind Cave National Park, South Dakota, 40% (213 individuals) of yearling females copulated and 9% successfully weaned a litter.

The mating season occurs from late February through April, but varies with latitude and site location of the colony. Estrus occurs for only one day during the breeding season.

=== Reproductive success ===
In Wind Cave National Park, the mean percentage of adult females that weaned a litter each year was 47% ± 14%. Reproductive success and survival may be greater in young colonies that have space for expansion. In a young colony (five years) with space for expansion, in Wind Cave National Park, 88% females were pregnant and 81% of young weaned, compared to an old colony (30 years) with no room for expansion, where 90% of females were pregnant and 41% of young were weaned.

=== Gestation period and litter size ===
Black-tailed prairie dog gestation is 34 days. Parturition occurs underground. Information about litter size at time of birth is unavailable, but the mean litter size observed above ground ranges from 3.0 to 4.9 young/litter. Only one litter is produced each year.

=== Development ===
In captivity, black-tailed prairie dog pups open their eyes at 30 days old. Pups are altricial and remain below ground for up to seven weeks to nurse. Maturity is complete at 15 months old. Lifespan of the black-tailed prairie dog in the wild is unknown, but males more than 3 years old experience high mortality. Females may live longer than males. According to Hoogland and others, lifespan is about 5 years for males and 7 years for females.

== Mortality ==
Major mortality factors include predation, disease, infanticide, habitat loss, poisoning, trapping, and shooting. Survival for the first year was 54% for females and less than 50% for males in Wind Cave National Park. Primary causes of death were predation and infanticide. Infanticide partially or eliminated 39% (361 individuals) of all litters. Lactating females were the most common killers. Mortality of young was highest due to heavy predation during the winter and early spring following birth. Mortality increases with dispersal from a colony or coterie.

Sylvatic plague, caused by the bacterium Yersinia pestis, can quickly eliminate entire black-tailed prairie dog colonies. Once infected, death occurs within a few days. Black-tailed prairie dogs are also susceptible to diseases transmitted by introduced animals.

=== Predators ===
The most common predators of black-tailed prairie dogs are coyotes (Canis latrans), American badgers (Taxidea taxus), bobcats (Lynx rufus), golden eagles (Aquila chrysaetos), ferruginous hawks (Buteo regalis), red-tailed hawks (Buteo jamaicensis), and prairie rattlesnakes (Crotalus viridis). Although now very rare, black-footed ferrets (Mustela nigripes) were once a major predator of the black-tailed prairie dog.

== Ecological role and threats ==
Black-tailed prairie dogs have been called "ecosystem engineers" due to their influence on the biotic and abiotic characteristics of their habitat, landscape architecture, and ecosystem structure and function. Research suggests black-tailed prairie dogs are a keystone species in some, but not all, geographic areas. Black-tailed prairie dogs enhance the diversity of vegetation, vertebrates, and invertebrates through their foraging and burrowing activities and by their presence as prey items. Grasslands inhabited by black-tailed prairie dogs support higher biodiversity than grasslands not occupied by them.

Hundreds of species of vertebrates and invertebrates are associated with black-tailed prairie dog colonies. Vertebrate species richness on their colonies increases with colony size and density. West of the Missouri River in Montana, 40% (100 species) of all vertebrate fauna in prairie habitats rely on black-tailed prairie dog colonies for food, nesting, and/or denning. Rare and declining species, such as the black-footed ferret, swift fox (Vulpes velox), mountain plover (Anarhynchus montanus), and burrowing owl (Athene cunicularia) are associated with colonies. Because their foraging activities keep plant development in a suppressed vegetative state with higher nutritional qualities, herbivores, including American bison, pronghorn (Antilocapra americana), and domestic cattle often prefer foraging in black-tailed prairie dog colonies. Animals that depend on herbaceous cover in sagebrush habitat, such as mule deer (Odocoileus hemionus) and sage grouse (Centrocercus spp.), may be deterred by the decreased vegetative cover on black-tailed prairie dog colonies. The dung-beetle Boreocanthon praticola exhibits a strong preference for black-tailed prairie dog pellets and can be commonly found feeding on pellets buried in prairie dog mounds. The beetle's range is limited by that of the prairie dog. For a list of vertebrate species associated with black-tailed prairie dog colonies, see.

Biodiversity in shortgrass prairies may be at risk due to the reductions in distribution and occurrence of black-tailed prairie dog. Threats include fragmentation and loss of habitat, unregulated eradication or control efforts, and sylvatic plague. As a result of habitat fragmentation and prairie dog eradication programs, colonies are now smaller and more fragmented than in presettlement times. Agriculture, livestock use, and other development have reduced habitat to 2% of its former range. Fragmented colonies are more susceptible to extirpation, primarily by sylvatic plague. The effect of roads on black-tailed prairie dogs is debatable. Roads may either facilitate or hinder their movement, depending on the landscape setting. Roads may be easy routes for dispersal, but those with heavy automobile use may increase mortality. Roads, streams, and lakes may serve as barriers to sylvatic plague.

== Conservation status ==
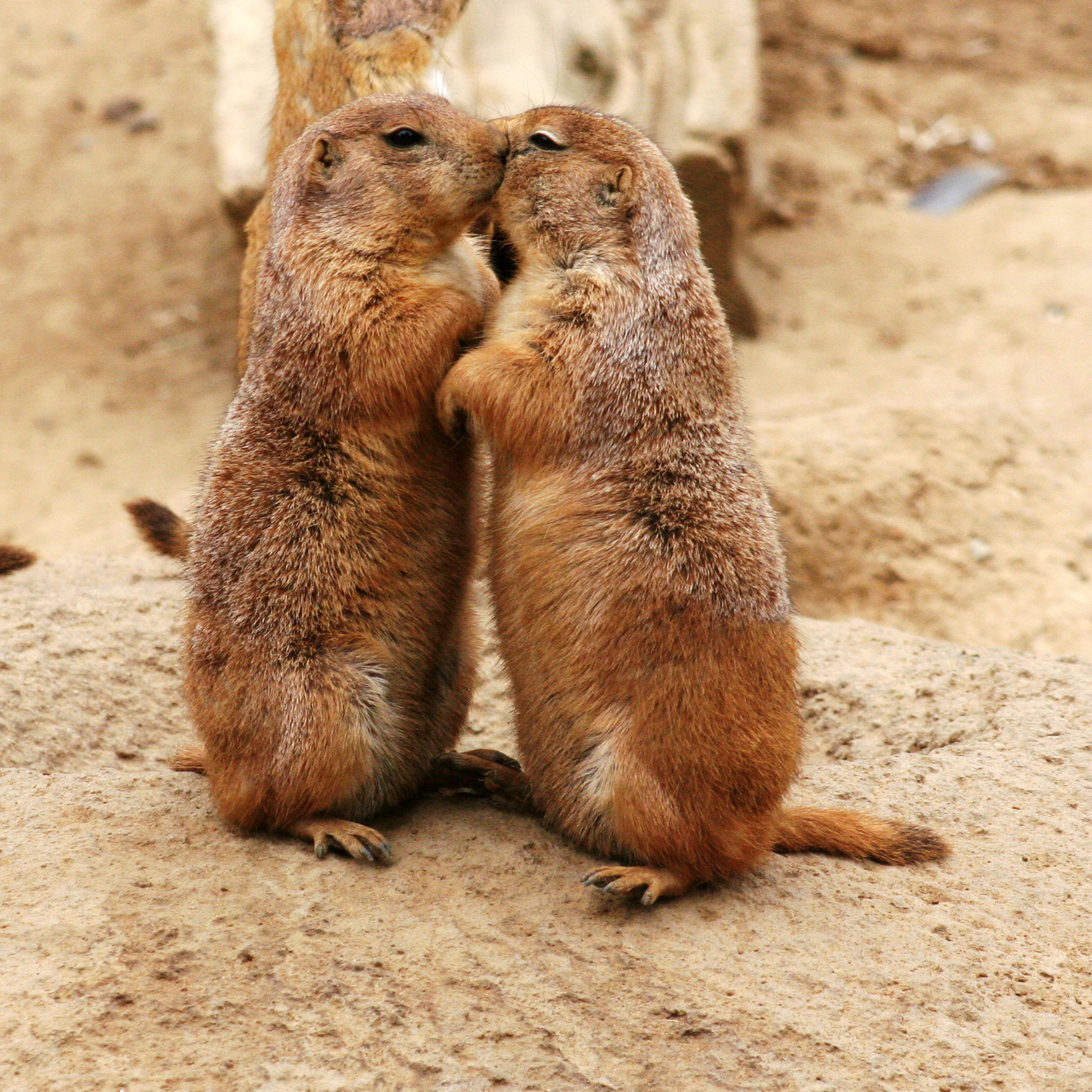
Kissing prairie dogs

Black-tailed prairie dogs are frequently exterminated from ranchland, being viewed as pests. Their habitat has been fragmented, and their numbers have been greatly reduced. Additionally, they are remarkably susceptible to plague. In 2006, all eight appearances of plague in black-tailed prairie dog colonies resulted in total colony loss. Studies in 1961 estimated only 364,000 acres (1,470 km^{2}) of occupied black-tailed prairie dog habitat in the United States. A second study in 2000 showed 676,000 acres (2,740 km^{2}). However, a comprehensive study between 10 states and various tribes in 2004 estimated 1,842,000 acres (7,450 km^{2}) in the United States, plus an additional 51,589 acres (208.77 km^{2}) in Mexico and Canada. Based on the 2004 studies, the US Fish and Wildlife Service removed the black-tailed prairie dog from the Endangered Species Act Candidate Species List in August 2004.

== Interactions with domestic livestock ==
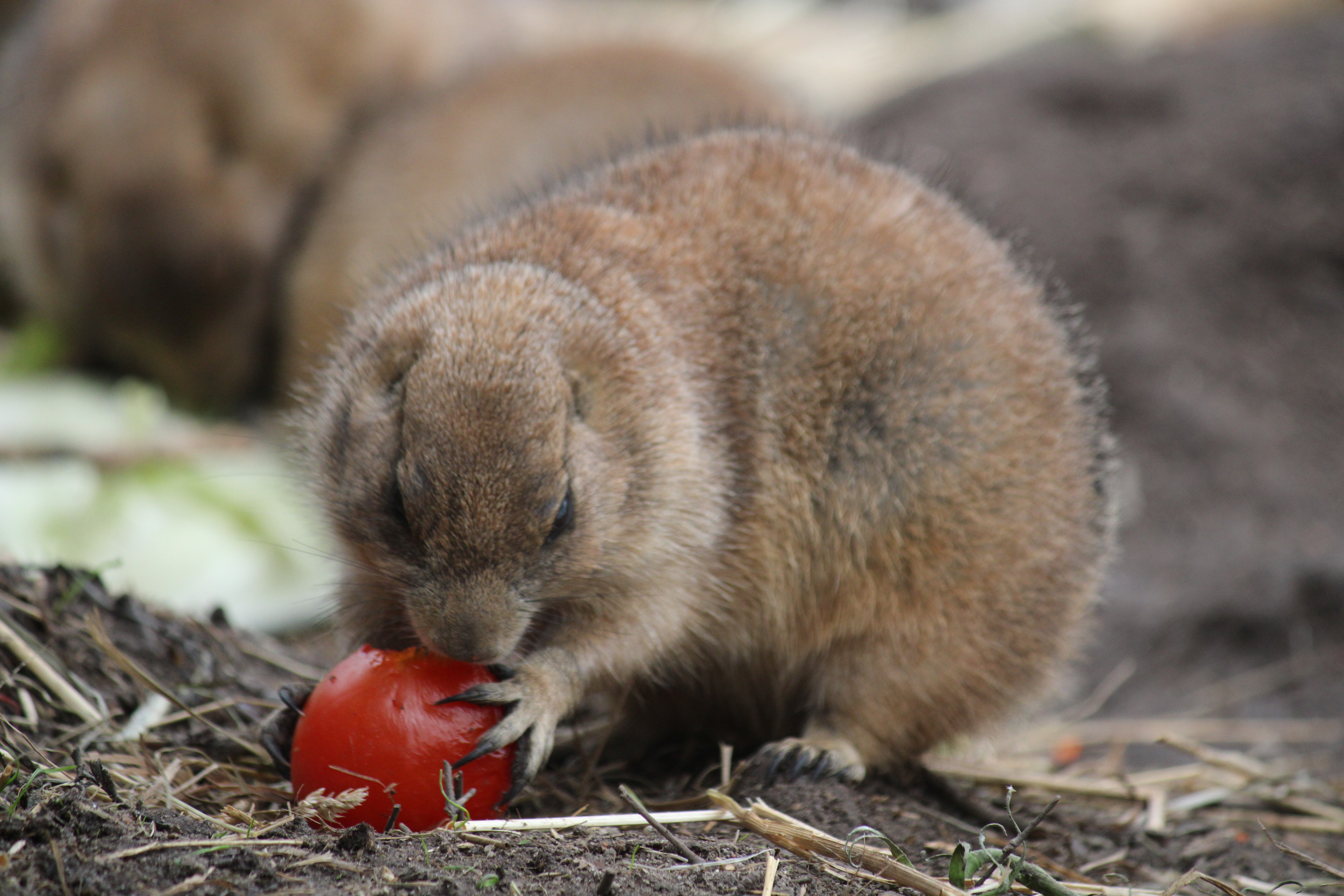
A black-tailed prairie dog eating a tomato

While black-tailed prairie dogs are often regarded as competitors with livestock for available forage, evidence of impacts on rangelands are mixed. Some research suggests they have either neutral or beneficial effects on rangeland used by livestock; however, their effects on rangelands are not uniform. In Cimarron National Grassland in southwest Kansas and adjacent private lands in Baca County, Colorado, some vegetational differences were detected between areas colonized by black-tailed prairie dogs and uncolonized areas, although not all differences were consistent between sample years. Species richness and diversity indices did not differ among colonized and uncolonized sites in either year, nor did the amount of bare ground. The authors conclude while prairie dogs alter shortgrass prairie such that the vegetation of colonies tends to be distinct from adjacent uncolonized areas, "prairie dogs do not substantially alter the essential character of shortgrass vegetation". Cattle neither significantly preferred nor avoided black-tailed prairie dog colonies in a study in the shortgrass steppe of northeastern Colorado. Cattle used colonies in proportion to the colony's availability, and grazed as intensively on colonies as on areas not occupied by black-tailed prairie dogs.

Competitive interactions between black-tailed prairie dogs and domestic livestock for preferred forage species are unclear. Several studies suggest black-tailed prairie dogs avoid eating many plants that livestock prefer, and prefer many plants livestock avoid. Conversely, on shortgrass prairie in Colorado, cattle and black-tailed prairie dogs had a 64% similarity in annual diets.

Some changes in plant composition brought about by black-tailed prairie dogs may benefit livestock by encouraging an increase in plants more tolerant of grazing, such as needleleaf sedge (Carex duriuscula), sixweeks grass (Vulpia octoflora), and scarlet globemallow. Grazing by black-tailed prairie dogs may also improve the nutritional qualities of some plants. On a shortgrass prairie near Fort Collins, Colorado, plant species diversity was greater inside black-tailed prairie dog colonies than outside of colonies, and perennial grasses such as buffalo grass and forbs increased. While black-tailed prairie dog colonies at Wind Cave National Park typically had lower levels of plant biomass and were dominated by forbs, plants growing on prairie dog colonies had higher leaf nitrogen concentrations than plants in mixed-grass prairie outside colonies. Foraging by black-tailed prairie dogs does not significantly affect steer weights. While forage availability and use by cattle decreased in black-tailed prairie dog foraging areas, steer weight was not reduced significantly in either of two years of study at the USDA's Southern Great Plains Experimental Range near Woodward, Oklahoma. Nutrient cycling, increased soil fertility, and subsequent changes in forage quality partly compensated for reduced forage availability.

== Pet trade ==
Black-tailed prairie dogs are the most common prairie dog species sold as exotic pets.

A temporary ban on selling this species was enacted in 2003 by the United States federal government. That ban officially expired on September 8, 2008.
