= Canthon bicolor =

Scientific classification
- Kingdom: Animalia
- Phylum: Arthropoda
- Clade: Pancrustacea
- Class: Insecta
- Order: Coleoptera
- Suborder: Polyphaga
- Infraorder: Scarabaeiformia
- Family: Scarabaeidae
- Genus: Canthon
- Species: C. bicolor

Binomial name
- Canthon bicolor Laporte, 1840

Species of beetle

Canthon bicolor is a species of beetle of the family Scarabaeidae. It is found in Brazil (Amapá, Pará), French Guiana, Guyana, Suriname and Venezuela.

== Description ==
Adults reach a length of about 10–13 mm (0.39–0.51 in). The dorsal surface of the pronotum and elytral disc has different colours, the pronotum with a light green metallic sheen and the elytra with a dark green metallic sheen.
