= Canthon staigi =

Scientific classification
- Kingdom: Animalia
- Phylum: Arthropoda
- Clade: Pancrustacea
- Class: Insecta
- Order: Coleoptera
- Suborder: Polyphaga
- Infraorder: Scarabaeiformia
- Family: Scarabaeidae
- Genus: Canthon
- Species: C. staigi

Binomial name
- Canthon staigi (Pereira, 1953)

Synonyms
- Peltecanthon staigi Pereira, 1953

Species of beetle

Canthon staigi is a species of beetle of the family Scarabaeidae. It is found in Argentina, Brazil (Alagoas, Amazonas, Bahia, Espírito Santo, Minas Gerais, Paraíba, Paraná, Pernambuco, Rio de Janeiro, São Paulo) and Paraguay.

== Description ==
Dorsally, the elytra and pronotum have a blue or green colour and blue and green reflections. The metafemora have several punctures at the base and no groove. The propygidium has a strong V-shaped carina between the pygidium and propygidium.
