= Sylvicanthon monnei =

Scientific classification
- Kingdom: Animalia
- Phylum: Arthropoda
- Clade: Pancrustacea
- Class: Insecta
- Order: Coleoptera
- Suborder: Polyphaga
- Infraorder: Scarabaeiformia
- Family: Scarabaeidae
- Genus: Sylvicanthon
- Species: S. monnei

Binomial name
- Sylvicanthon monnei Cupello & Vaz-de-Mello, 2018

Species of beetle

Sylvicanthon monnei is a species of beetle of the family Scarabaeidae. It is found in southern Amazonia in Brazil.

== Description ==
Adults reach a length of about 6.3–6.8 mm (0.25–0.27 in). The head, pronotum, elytra and pygidium are predominantly dark green. The metaventrite is very dark black with soft greenish reflections. The meso- and metafemora are reddish-brown or dark brown.

== Etymology ==
The species is named after Uruguayan-Brazilian entomologist Miguel A. Monné.
