= Sylvicanthon enkerlini =

Scientific classification
- Kingdom: Animalia
- Phylum: Arthropoda
- Clade: Pancrustacea
- Class: Insecta
- Order: Coleoptera
- Suborder: Polyphaga
- Infraorder: Scarabaeiformia
- Family: Scarabaeidae
- Genus: Sylvicanthon
- Species: S. enkerlini

Binomial name
- Sylvicanthon enkerlini (Martinez, Halffter & Halffter, 1964)

Synonyms
- Glaphyrocanthon enkerlini Martinez, Halffter & Halffter, 1964

Species of beetle

Sylvicanthon enkerlini is a species of beetle of the family Scarabaeidae. It is found in the dry forests between Cerrado, Caatinga, Amazonia and the Atlantic Forest in the Brazilian north-and southeast.

== Description ==
Adults reach a length of about 6.4–8 mm (0.25–0.31 in). The dorsum, metaventrite and pygidium are entirely black, without metallic reflections and the external edge of the clypeus is occasionally dark brown. The ventral face of the legs ranges from black to dark brown and the dorsal face of the protibiae is reddish-brown.

== Etymology ==
The species is named after Mexican entomologist Dieter Enkerlin Schallenmüller.
