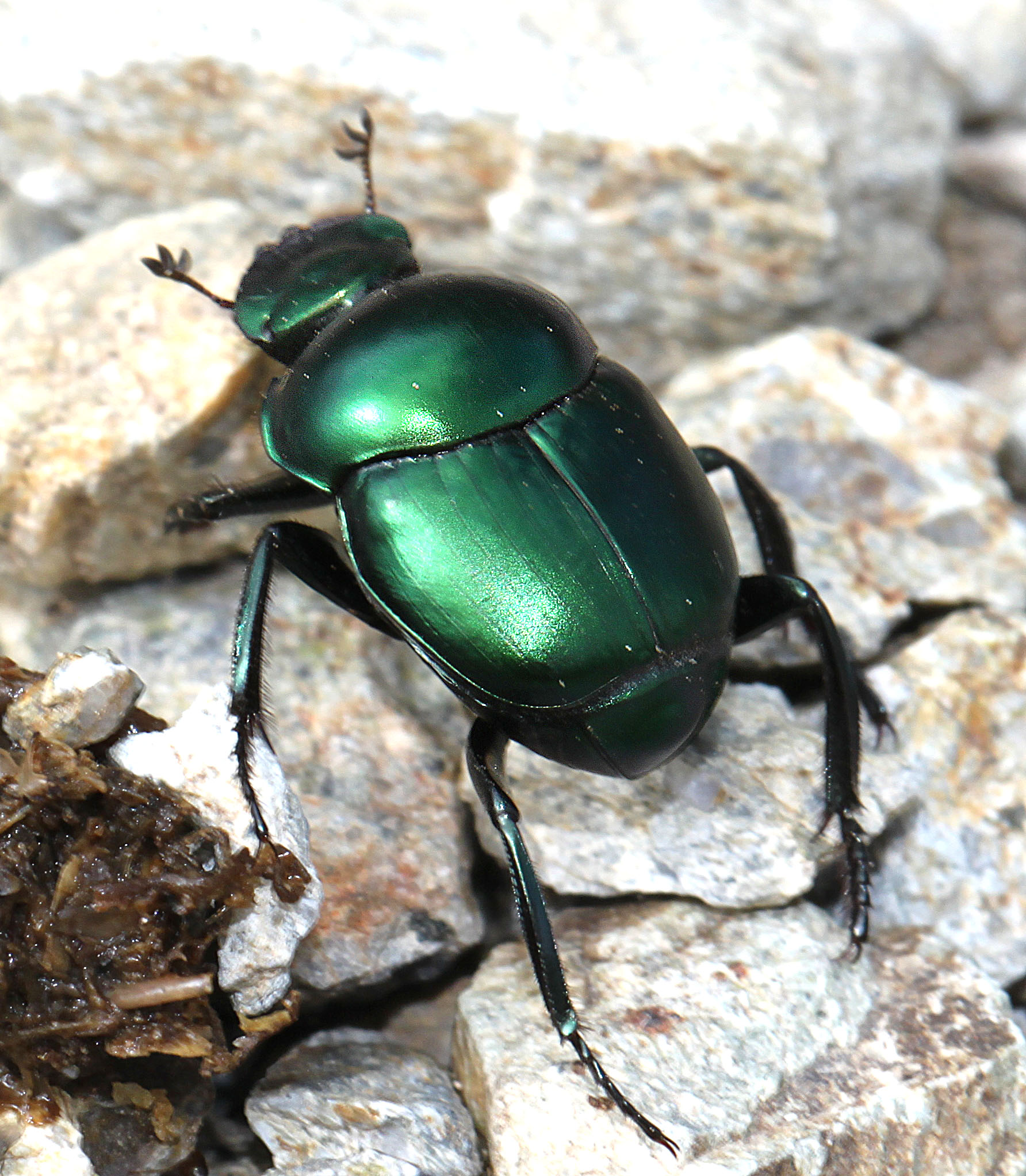
- Canthon indigaceus

Conservation status
- Least Concern (IUCN 3.1)

Scientific classification
- Kingdom: Animalia
- Phylum: Arthropoda
- Clade: Pancrustacea
- Class: Insecta
- Order: Coleoptera
- Suborder: Polyphaga
- Infraorder: Scarabaeiformia
- Family: Scarabaeidae
- Genus: Canthon
- Species: C. indigaceus

Binomial name
- Canthon indigaceus LECONTE, 1866

Synonyms
- Canthon chevrolati Harold, 1868

= Canthon indigaceus =

Species of beetle

Canthon indigaceus is a species of dung beetle in the family Scarabaeidae.

The IUCN conservation status of Canthon indigaceus is "LC", least concern, with no immediate threat to the species' survival.

== Subspecies ==
These three subspecies belong to the species Canthon indigaceus:

- Canthon indigaceus chevrolati Harold, 1868^{c g}
- Canthon indigaceus chiapas Robinson, 1948^{c g}
- Canthon indigaceus indigaceus^{g}

Data sources: i = ITIS, c = Catalogue of Life, g = GBIF, b = Bugguide.net
