= Sylvicanthon furvus =

Scientific classification
- Kingdom: Animalia
- Phylum: Arthropoda
- Clade: Pancrustacea
- Class: Insecta
- Order: Coleoptera
- Suborder: Polyphaga
- Infraorder: Scarabaeiformia
- Family: Scarabaeidae
- Genus: Sylvicanthon
- Species: S. furvus

Binomial name
- Sylvicanthon furvus (Schmidt, 1920)

Synonyms
- Canthon furvus Schmidt, 1920

Species of beetle

Sylvicanthon furvus is a species of beetle of the family Scarabaeidae. It is found on the eastern slopes of the Andes in Peru and Bolivia.

== Description ==
Adults reach a length of about 6.2–8.1 mm (0.24–0.32 in). They are very variable and iridescent. In general, the head has a greenish or bluish sheen. The pronotum is usually purple, but occasionally with a greenish sheen. The elytra are purple or blue. The meso- and metafemora are reddish-brown and the metaventrite has a strong green shine. The pygidium is of the same colour as the elytra.

== Etymology ==
The species name is derived from Latin furvus (meaning black or dark) and probably refers to the consistently dark colouration.
