= Sylvicanthon edmondsi =

Scientific classification
- Kingdom: Animalia
- Phylum: Arthropoda
- Clade: Pancrustacea
- Class: Insecta
- Order: Coleoptera
- Suborder: Polyphaga
- Infraorder: Scarabaeiformia
- Family: Scarabaeidae
- Genus: Sylvicanthon
- Species: S. edmondsi

Binomial name
- Sylvicanthon edmondsi Cupello & Vaz-de-Mello, 2018

Species of beetle

Sylvicanthon edmondsi is a species of beetle of the family Scarabaeidae. It is found in north-western Amazonia, mainly in the sub-Andean areas of Colombia, Ecuador and Peru.

== Description ==
Adults reach a length of about 6.1–8 mm (0.24–0.31 in). The entire body has very dark tonalities. The head is dark purple (in some specimens, the frons has greenish reflections). The pronotum has a strong greenish or bluish sheen at the centre and purplish reflections on the sides. The elytra are usually dark blue or purple, occasionally with weak greenish reflections. The striae have the same colouration as the rest of tegument. The metaventrite is black with a very weak greenish or coppery shine. The meso- and metafemora are orange-brown or yellowish, with the base distinctly darker than at least the apical two-thirds. The pygidium usually has a predominant greenish shine and some coppery reflections, especially at the base.

== Etymology ==
The species is named after the American scarabaeidologist W.D. Edmonds.
