= Canthon terciae =

Scientific classification
- Kingdom: Animalia
- Phylum: Arthropoda
- Clade: Pancrustacea
- Class: Insecta
- Order: Coleoptera
- Suborder: Polyphaga
- Infraorder: Scarabaeiformia
- Family: Scarabaeidae
- Genus: Canthon
- Species: C. terciae

Binomial name
- Canthon terciae Nunes, Nunes & Vaz-de-Mello, 2020

Species of beetle

Canthon terciae is a species of beetle of the family Scarabaeidae. It is found in Brazil (Rio Grande do Norte, Paraíba, Pernambuco, Sergipe).

== Description ==
Adults reach a length of about 8.5–11.5 mm (0.33–0.45 in). They are red with bright green dorsally and green with bright red ventrally.

== Etymology ==
The species is named after Dr. Tercia Vargas dos Santos.
