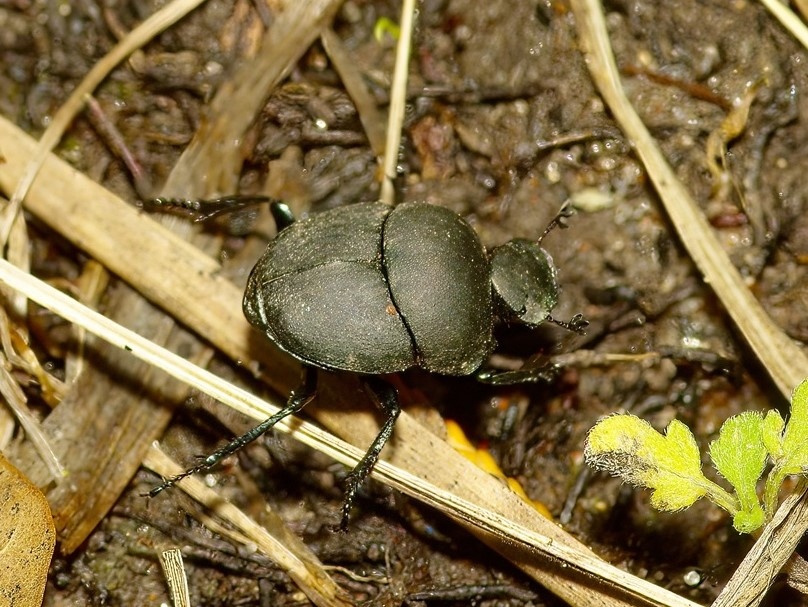

Scientific classification
- Kingdom: Animalia
- Phylum: Arthropoda
- Clade: Pancrustacea
- Class: Insecta
- Order: Coleoptera
- Suborder: Polyphaga
- Infraorder: Scarabaeiformia
- Family: Scarabaeidae
- Tribe: Deltochilini
- Genus: Canthon
- Species: C. imitator

Binomial name
- Canthon imitator Brown, 1946

Synonyms
- Canthon floridanus Brown, 1946

= Canthon imitator =

Species of beetle

Canthon imitator is a species of beetle in the family Scarabaeidae.
