= Canthon chalcites =

Scientific classification
- Kingdom: Animalia
- Phylum: Arthropoda
- Clade: Pancrustacea
- Class: Insecta
- Order: Coleoptera
- Suborder: Polyphaga
- Infraorder: Scarabaeiformia
- Family: Scarabaeidae
- Tribe: Deltochilini
- Genus: Canthon
- Species: C. chalcites

Binomial name
- Canthon chalcites (Haldeman, 1843)

Species of beetle

Canthon chalcites is a species in the beetle family Scarabaeidae. It is found in North America.
