= Sylvicanthon =

- Sylvicanthon bridarollii

Scientific classification
- Kingdom: Animalia
- Phylum: Arthropoda
- Clade: Pancrustacea
- Class: Insecta
- Order: Coleoptera
- Suborder: Polyphaga
- Infraorder: Scarabaeiformia
- Family: Scarabaeidae
- Subfamily: Scarabaeinae
- Tribe: Deltochilini
- Genus: Sylvicanthon; Halffter & Martinez, 1977

Synonyms
- Silvicanthon

Genus of beetles

Sylvicanthon is a genus of beetles of the family Scarabaeidae.

== Species ==
- Sylvicanthon aequinoctialis (Harold, 1868)
- Sylvicanthon attenboroughi Cupello & Vaz-de-Mello, 2018
- Sylvicanthon bridarollii (Martinez, 1949)
- Sylvicanthon candezei (Harold, 1869)
- Sylvicanthon edmondsi Cupello & Vaz-de-Mello, 2018
- Sylvicanthon enkerlini (Martinez, Halffter & Halffter, 1964)
- Sylvicanthon foveiventris (Schmidt, 1920)
- Sylvicanthon furvus (Schmidt, 1920)
- Sylvicanthon genieri Cupello & Vaz-de-Mello, 2018
- Sylvicanthon mayri Cupello & Vaz-de-Mello, 2018
- Sylvicanthon monnei Cupello & Vaz-de-Mello, 2018
- Sylvicanthon obscurus (Schmidt, 1920)
- Sylvicanthon proseni (Martinez, 1949)
- Sylvicanthon seag Cupello & Vaz-de-Mello, 2018
- Sylvicanthon securus (Schmidt, 1920)
