= Boreocanthon praticola =

Scientific classification
- Kingdom: Animalia
- Phylum: Arthropoda
- Clade: Pancrustacea
- Class: Insecta
- Order: Coleoptera
- Suborder: Polyphaga
- Infraorder: Scarabaeiformia
- Family: Scarabaeidae
- Genus: Boreocanthon
- Species: B. praticola

Binomial name
- Boreocanthon praticola (LeConte, 1859)

Synonyms
- Boreocanthon vetustus Pierce, 1946

Species of scarab beetle

Boreocanthon praticola is a species of dung beetle in the family Scarabaeidae. It occurs in the Great Plains from southern Canada to Texas as well as in the American southwest and northwestern Mexico.

Boreocanthon praticola has a strong preference for prairie dog dung and its range roughly corresponds to the combined ranges of the black-tailed prairie dog and Gunnison's prairie dog. It can be commonly found feeding on prairie dog pellets buried within prairie dog mounds. It is known to roll prairie dog pellets without forming them into a ball. It will also utilize the dung of cattle, bison, pigs, humans, and rabbits.

While the species does not occur in California today, it has been identified in the La Brea Tar Pits.
