= Boreocanthon simplex =

Scientific classification
- Kingdom: Animalia
- Phylum: Arthropoda
- Clade: Pancrustacea
- Class: Insecta
- Order: Coleoptera
- Suborder: Polyphaga
- Infraorder: Scarabaeiformia
- Family: Scarabaeidae
- Genus: Boreocanthon
- Species: B. simplex

Binomial name
- Boreocanthon simplex (LeConte, 1857)

Synonyms
- Canthon simplex LeConte, 1857; Canthon corvinus Harold, 1868; Canthon bisignatus Balthasar, 1939

Species of scarab beetle

Boreocanthon simplex is a species of dung beetle in the family Scarabaeidae. It is found in western North America.

Boreocanthon simplex expresses a considerably higher degree of morphological and color variation than other members of its genus, possibly constituting several species.

== Distribution and habitat ==
Boreocanthon simplex occurs from the Rocky Mountains westward. It may be found as far north as southern British Columbia and as far south as central Baja California. Across its range, it displays extreme ecological versatility and may be found in highly variable habitats including montane forests, shrub-steppe, and Mediterranean scrub. It may be found from elevations below 300 metres (980 ft) to above 3,000 metres (9,800 ft).

Its remains have been recovered from the La Brea Tar Pits.

== Diet ==
Boreocanthon simplex is a generalist and has been documented feeding on feces from diverse mammals including cattle, horses, goats, elk, deer, humans, bears, and rabbits. It will also feed on carrion.
