= Canthon cobosi =

Scientific classification
- Kingdom: Animalia
- Phylum: Arthropoda
- Clade: Pancrustacea
- Class: Insecta
- Order: Coleoptera
- Suborder: Polyphaga
- Infraorder: Scarabaeiformia
- Family: Scarabaeidae
- Genus: Canthon
- Species: C. cobosi

Binomial name
- Canthon cobosi (Pereira & Martinez, 1960)

Synonyms
- Glaphyrocanthon cobosi Pereira & Martinez, 1960

Species of beetle

Canthon cobosi is a species of beetle of the family Scarabaeidae. It is found in Argentina, Bolivia, Brazil (Mato Grosso, Mato Grosso do Sul) and Paraguay.

== Etymology ==
The species is named after the Spanish entomologist Antonio Cobos Sánchez.
