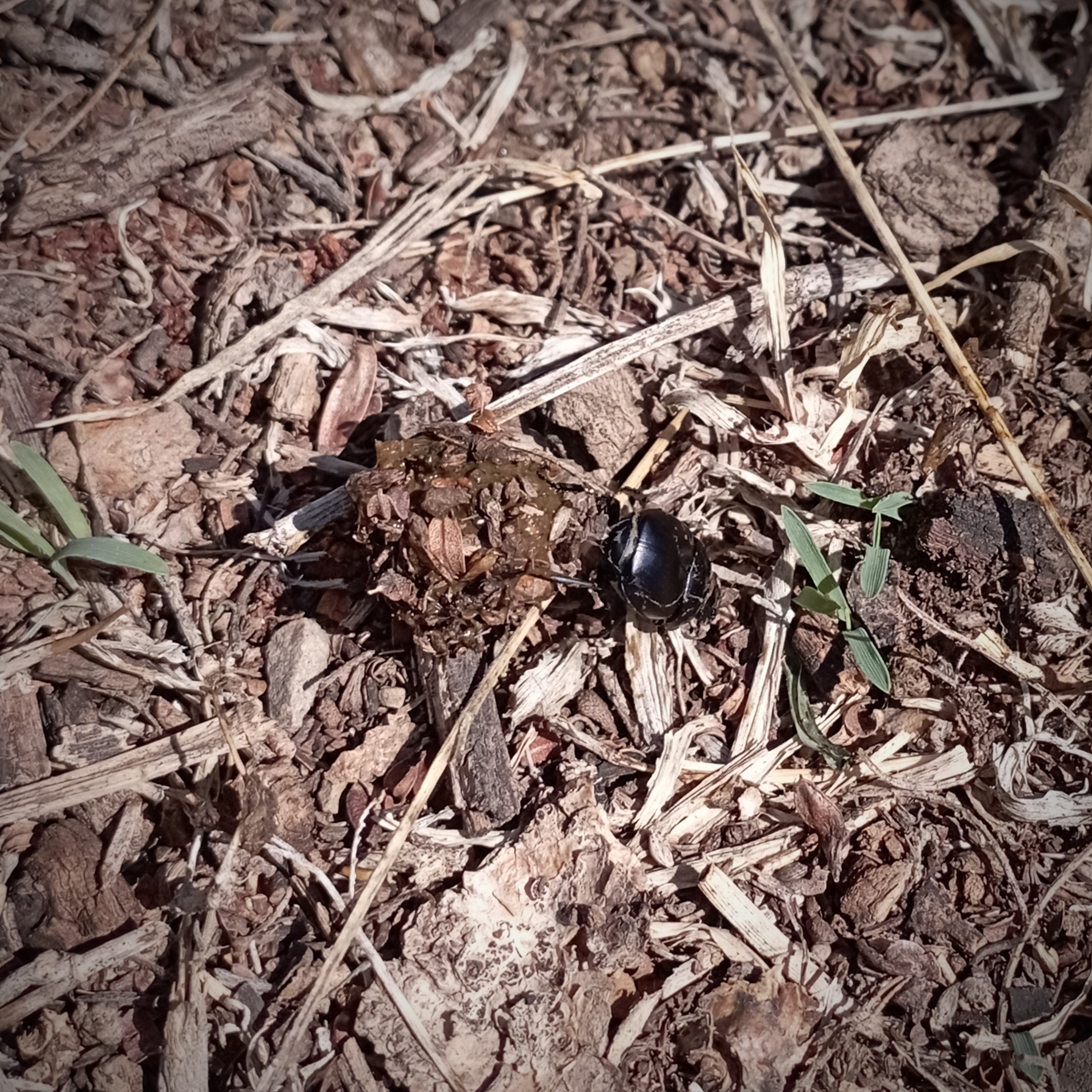

Scientific classification
- Kingdom: Animalia
- Phylum: Arthropoda
- Clade: Pancrustacea
- Class: Insecta
- Order: Coleoptera
- Suborder: Polyphaga
- Infraorder: Scarabaeiformia
- Family: Scarabaeidae
- Genus: Canthon
- Species: C. humectus

Binomial name
- Canthon humectus (Say, 1832)

= Canthon humectus =

Species of beetle

Canthon humectus is a species in the beetle family Scarabaeidae. It is found in North America.

== Subspecies ==
These eight subspecies belong to the species Canthon humectus:

- Canthon humectus alvarengai Halffter, 1961
- Canthon humectus assimilis Robinson, 1946
- Canthon humectus blumei Halffter & Halffter, 2003
- Canthon humectus hidalgoensis Bates, 1887
- Canthon humectus humectus (Say, 1832)
- Canthon humectus incisus Robinson, 1948
- Canthon humectus riverai Halffter & Halffter, 2003
- Canthon humectus sayi Robinson, 1948
