= Sylvicanthon bridarollii =

Scientific classification
- Kingdom: Animalia
- Phylum: Arthropoda
- Clade: Pancrustacea
- Class: Insecta
- Order: Coleoptera
- Suborder: Polyphaga
- Infraorder: Scarabaeiformia
- Family: Scarabaeidae
- Genus: Sylvicanthon
- Species: S. bridarollii

Binomial name
- Sylvicanthon bridarollii (Martinez, 1949)

Synonyms
- Glaphyrocanthon bridarollii Martinez, 1949

Species of beetle

Sylvicanthon bridarollii is a species of beetle of the family Scarabaeidae. It is found in Bolivia, Brazil (Acre, Rondônia), Colombia, Ecuador and Peru.

== Description ==
Adults reach a length of about 6.6–9.2 mm (0.26–0.36 in). The head and pronotum are dark purple or coppery, occasionally with weak greenish reflections. The elytra are dark green or dark blue. When green, the striae sometimes have a dark blue colouration and are slightly more contrasting with the elytral tegument. The metaventrite is black or coppery, usually with slight greenish reflections. The meso- and metafemora range from dark brown to reddish-brown and orangish or yellowish, but the base is always distinctly darker than at least the apical two-thirds. The pygidium sometimes has a predominantly greenish shine, and some coppery reflections, especially at the base.

== Natural history ==
They are preferentially coprophagous, but can occasionally be attracted to carrion.

== Etymology ==
The species is named after the Argentinian naturalist and Jesuit priest Albino J. Bridarolli.
