= Canthon splendidus =

Scientific classification
- Kingdom: Animalia
- Phylum: Arthropoda
- Clade: Pancrustacea
- Class: Insecta
- Order: Coleoptera
- Suborder: Polyphaga
- Infraorder: Scarabaeiformia
- Family: Scarabaeidae
- Genus: Canthon
- Species: C. splendidus

Binomial name
- Canthon splendidus Schmidt, 1922

Species of beetle

Canthon splendidus is a species of beetle of the family Scarabaeidae. It is found in Brazil (Espírito Santo, Minas Gerais, Rio de Janeiro).

== Description ==
Adults reach a length of about 9.5–12 mm (0.37–0.47 in). Dorsally, the elytra are dark blue, while the pronotum is green with bright red and yellow reflections.
