= Sylvicanthon genieri =

Scientific classification
- Kingdom: Animalia
- Phylum: Arthropoda
- Clade: Pancrustacea
- Class: Insecta
- Order: Coleoptera
- Suborder: Polyphaga
- Infraorder: Scarabaeiformia
- Family: Scarabaeidae
- Genus: Sylvicanthon
- Species: S. genieri

Binomial name
- Sylvicanthon genieri Cupello & Vaz-de-Mello, 2018

Species of beetle

Sylvicanthon genieri is a species of beetle of the family Scarabaeidae. It is found in the cloud forests of western Amazonia and on the slopes of the Andes in Ecuador and Peru.

== Description ==
Adults reach a length of about 6.5–8.2 mm (0.26–0.32 in). The head, pronotum, elytra, metaventrite, and pygidium are largely coppery. The pygidium and, more rarely, the centre of the head occasionally with greenish reflections. The meso- and metafemora are orangish.

== Etymology ==
The species is named after the Canadian entomologist François Génier.
