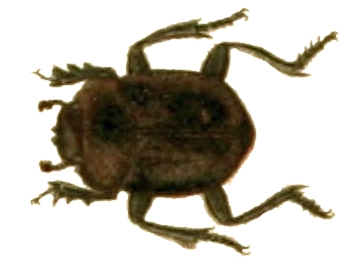

Scientific classification
- Kingdom: Animalia
- Phylum: Arthropoda
- Clade: Pancrustacea
- Class: Insecta
- Order: Coleoptera
- Suborder: Polyphaga
- Infraorder: Scarabaeiformia
- Family: Scarabaeidae
- Tribe: Deltochilini
- Genus: Canthon
- Species: C. vigilans

Binomial name
- Canthon vigilans Leconte, 1858

= Canthon vigilans =

Species of beetle

Canthon vigilans, the vigilant dung beetle, is a species in the family Scarabaeidae. It is found in North America.
