= Sylvicanthon securus =

Scientific classification
- Kingdom: Animalia
- Phylum: Arthropoda
- Clade: Pancrustacea
- Class: Insecta
- Order: Coleoptera
- Suborder: Polyphaga
- Infraorder: Scarabaeiformia
- Family: Scarabaeidae
- Genus: Sylvicanthon
- Species: S. securus

Binomial name
- Sylvicanthon securus (Schmidt, 1920)

Synonyms
- Canthon securus Schmidt, 1920

Species of beetle

Sylvicanthon securus is a species of beetle of the family Scarabaeidae. It is found in northern Amazonia in Suriname, French Guiana and Brazil.

== Description ==
Adults reach a length of about 6.3–7 mm (0.25–0.28 in). The head is bicolored, with a wide purplish or coppery area covering the outer edge, while the posterior region is bright green. The pronotum is entirely green and the elytra are also green, with the striae either contrasting or not. The metaventrite has a greenish shine at the centre and purplish or coppery at the rest of the tegument. The meso- and metafemora are yellowish or orangish and the profemur is slightly darker than the others. The pygidium is bright green.

== Natural history ==
They are thought to be coprophagous.

== Etymology ==
The species name is derived from Latin securis (meaning axe or hatchet) and refers to the shape of protibiae, which have a strong internal expansion.
