= Canthon octodentatus =

Scientific classification
- Kingdom: Animalia
- Phylum: Arthropoda
- Clade: Pancrustacea
- Class: Insecta
- Order: Coleoptera
- Suborder: Polyphaga
- Infraorder: Scarabaeiformia
- Family: Scarabaeidae
- Genus: Canthon
- Species: C. octodentatus

Binomial name
- Canthon octodentatus Schmidt, 1920

Species of beetle

Canthon octodentatus is a species of beetle of the family Scarabaeidae. It is found in Bolivia, Brazil, Paraguay and Peru.
