= Canthon haroldi =

Scientific classification
- Kingdom: Animalia
- Phylum: Arthropoda
- Clade: Pancrustacea
- Class: Insecta
- Order: Coleoptera
- Suborder: Polyphaga
- Infraorder: Scarabaeiformia
- Family: Scarabaeidae
- Genus: Canthon
- Species: C. haroldi

Binomial name
- Canthon haroldi Nunes, Nunes & Vaz-de-Mello, 2020

Synonyms
- Canthon prasinus Harold, 1867 (preocc.); Canthon sulcatus Laporte, 1840

Species of beetle

Canthon haroldi is a species of beetle of the family Scarabaeidae. It is found in Brazil (Alagoas, Bahia, Espírito Santo, Minas Gerais, Rio de Janeiro) and French Guiana.

== Description ==
The elytra and pronotum are dorsally green with shades of yellow and red. The metafemora have sulcus extending from the base and up to one-third of the total femur length.
