= Sylvicanthon foveiventris =

Scientific classification
- Kingdom: Animalia
- Phylum: Arthropoda
- Clade: Pancrustacea
- Class: Insecta
- Order: Coleoptera
- Suborder: Polyphaga
- Infraorder: Scarabaeiformia
- Family: Scarabaeidae
- Genus: Sylvicanthon
- Species: S. foveiventris

Binomial name
- Sylvicanthon foveiventris (Schmidt, 1920)

Synonyms
- Canthon foveiventris Schmidt, 1920

Species of beetle

Sylvicanthon foveiventris is a species of beetle of the family Scarabaeidae. It is found in the Atlantic forest above 600 meters in the Brazilian south-east.

== Description ==
Adults reach a length of about 6.2–7.9 mm (0.24–0.31 in). The dorsum is lustrous and shiny. The head, pronotum, pygidium and ventrite VI are dark purple and the elytra are dark green or dark blue. The meso- and metafemora are reddish-brown. The venter has purplish reflections.

== Natural history ==
They seem to be strictly coprophagous.

== Etymology ==
The species name is derived from Latin fovea and ventris and likely refers to the three pairs of foveae present on the sides of the abdomen of females of this species.
