= Canthon fulgidus =

Scientific classification
- Kingdom: Animalia
- Phylum: Arthropoda
- Clade: Pancrustacea
- Class: Insecta
- Order: Coleoptera
- Suborder: Polyphaga
- Infraorder: Scarabaeiformia
- Family: Scarabaeidae
- Genus: Canthon
- Species: C. fulgidus

Binomial name
- Canthon fulgidus Redtenbacher, 1868

Species of beetle

Canthon fulgidus is a species of beetle of the family Scarabaeidae. It is found in Bolivia, Colombia, Ecuador, Peru, Brazil (Acre, Amazonas, Mato Grosso, Rondônia, Pará).

== Description ==
Adults reach a length of about 8–16 mm (0.31–0.63 in). The dorsal surface has a golden metallic sheen.

== Subspecies ==
- Canthon fulgidus fulgidus (Brazil: Mato Grosso)
- Canthon fulgidus martinezi Nunes, Nunes & Vaz-de-Mello, 2018 (Bolivia, Colombia, Ecuador, Peru, Brazil: Amazonas)
- Canthon fulgidus pereirai Nunes, Nunes & Vaz-de-Mello, 2018 (Bolivia, Brazil: Acre, Amazonas, Mato Grosso, Rondônia, Pará)
Canthon fulgidus pereirai

Canthon fulgidus martinezi

Canthon fulgidus fulgidus

Canthon fulgidus fulgidus showing perching behaviour
