= Sylvicanthon obscurus =

- Yellowish form
- Purplish form

Scientific classification
- Kingdom: Animalia
- Phylum: Arthropoda
- Clade: Pancrustacea
- Class: Insecta
- Order: Coleoptera
- Suborder: Polyphaga
- Infraorder: Scarabaeiformia
- Family: Scarabaeidae
- Genus: Sylvicanthon
- Species: S. obscurus

Binomial name
- Sylvicanthon obscurus (Schmidt, 1920)

Synonyms
- Canthon obscurus Schmidt, 1920

Species of beetle

Sylvicanthon obscurus is a species of beetle of the family Scarabaeidae. It is found in the northern Atlantic forest from Alagoas to Espírito Santo in Brazil.

== Description ==
Adults reach a length of about 7.1–9.5 mm (0.28–0.37 in). The dorsum is slightly shiny and lustrous. The head and pronotum range from light green with yellowish reflections to dark purple without any trace of a yellowish or greenish sheen. The elytra are usually very dark green or blue, or, more rarely, with a strong purplish-blue sheen. The pygidium and metaventrite are dark green or blue, without a metallic sheen or with a reduced sheen. The legs are reddish-brown.

== Natural history ==
They are thought to be coprophagous.

== Etymology ==
The species name is derived from Latin obscurus (meaning dark) and probably refers to the dark green or dark blue elytra.
