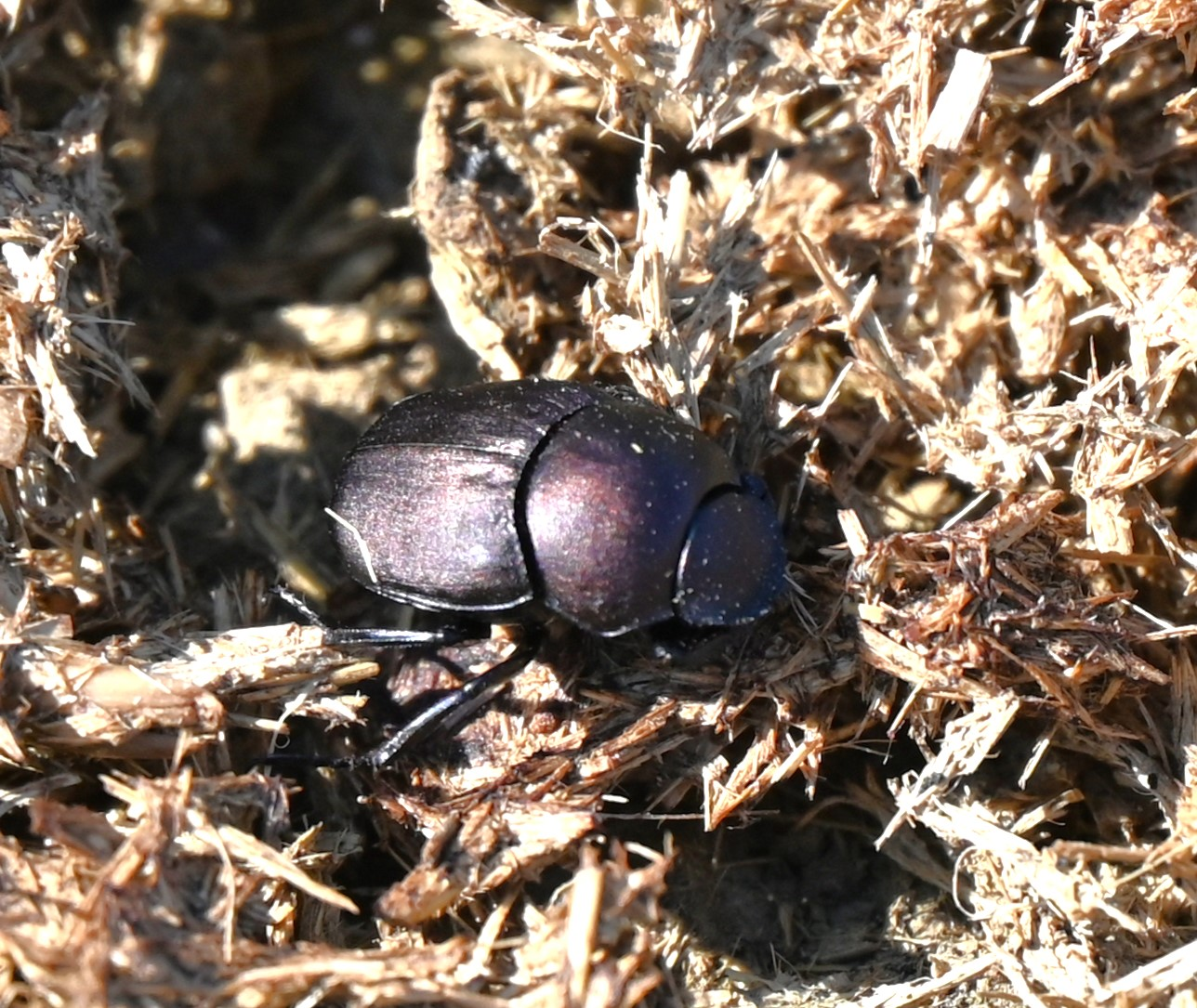

Scientific classification
- Kingdom: Animalia
- Phylum: Arthropoda
- Clade: Pancrustacea
- Class: Insecta
- Order: Coleoptera
- Suborder: Polyphaga
- Infraorder: Scarabaeiformia
- Family: Scarabaeidae
- Genus: Canthon
- Species: C. pilularius

Binomial name
- Canthon pilularius (Linnaeus, 1758)

Synonyms
- Canthon viridescens Horn, 1870; Coprobius obtusidens Ziegler, 1844; Scarabaeus hudsonias Forster, 1771; Scarabaeus laevis Drury, 1773; Scarabaeus volvens Fabricius, 1792

= Canthon pilularius =

Species of beetle

Canthon pilularius, the common tumblebug, is a species in the beetle family Scarabaeidae. It is found in Oceania and North America.

== Gallery ==
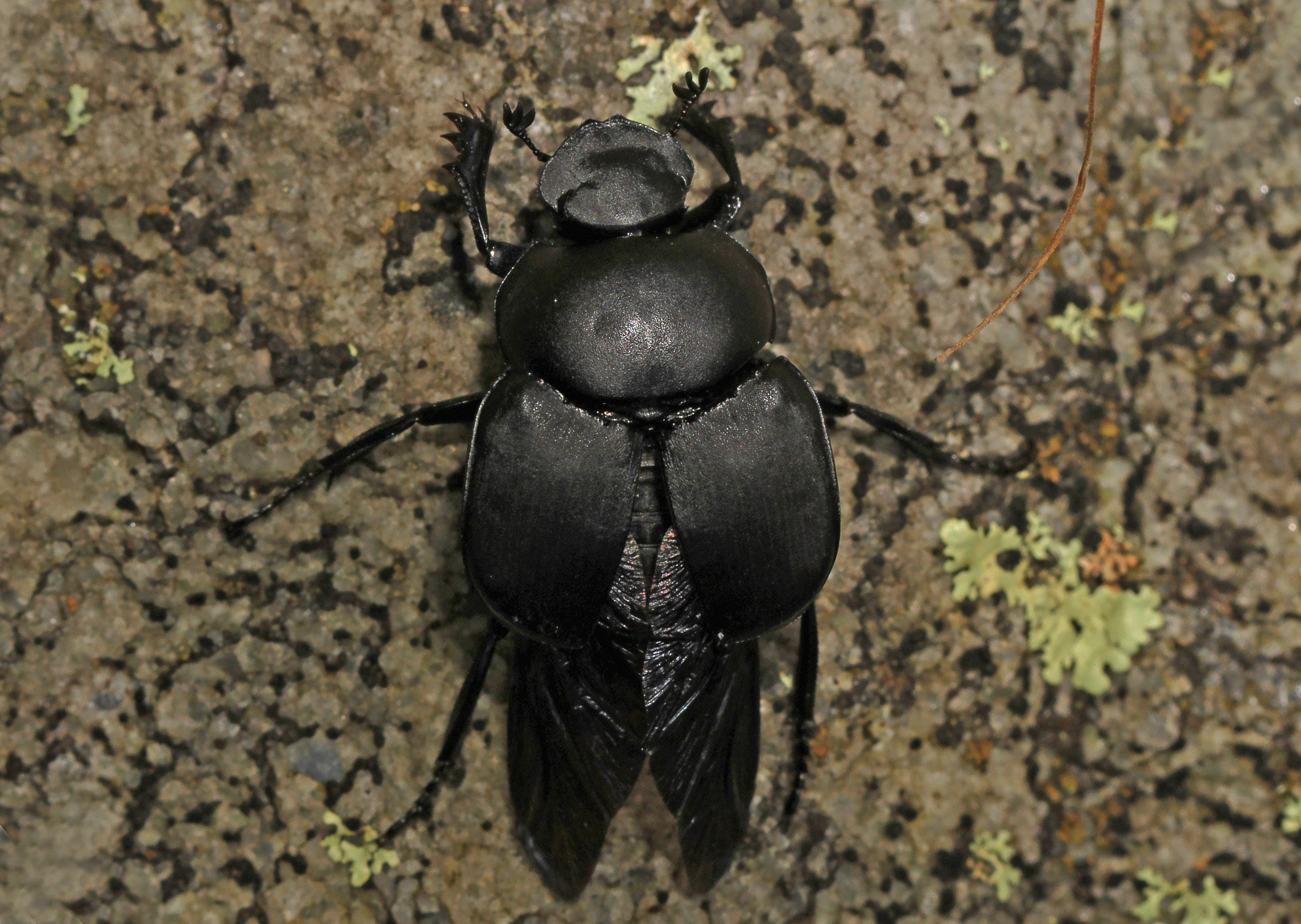
Common tumblebug, Canthon pilularius

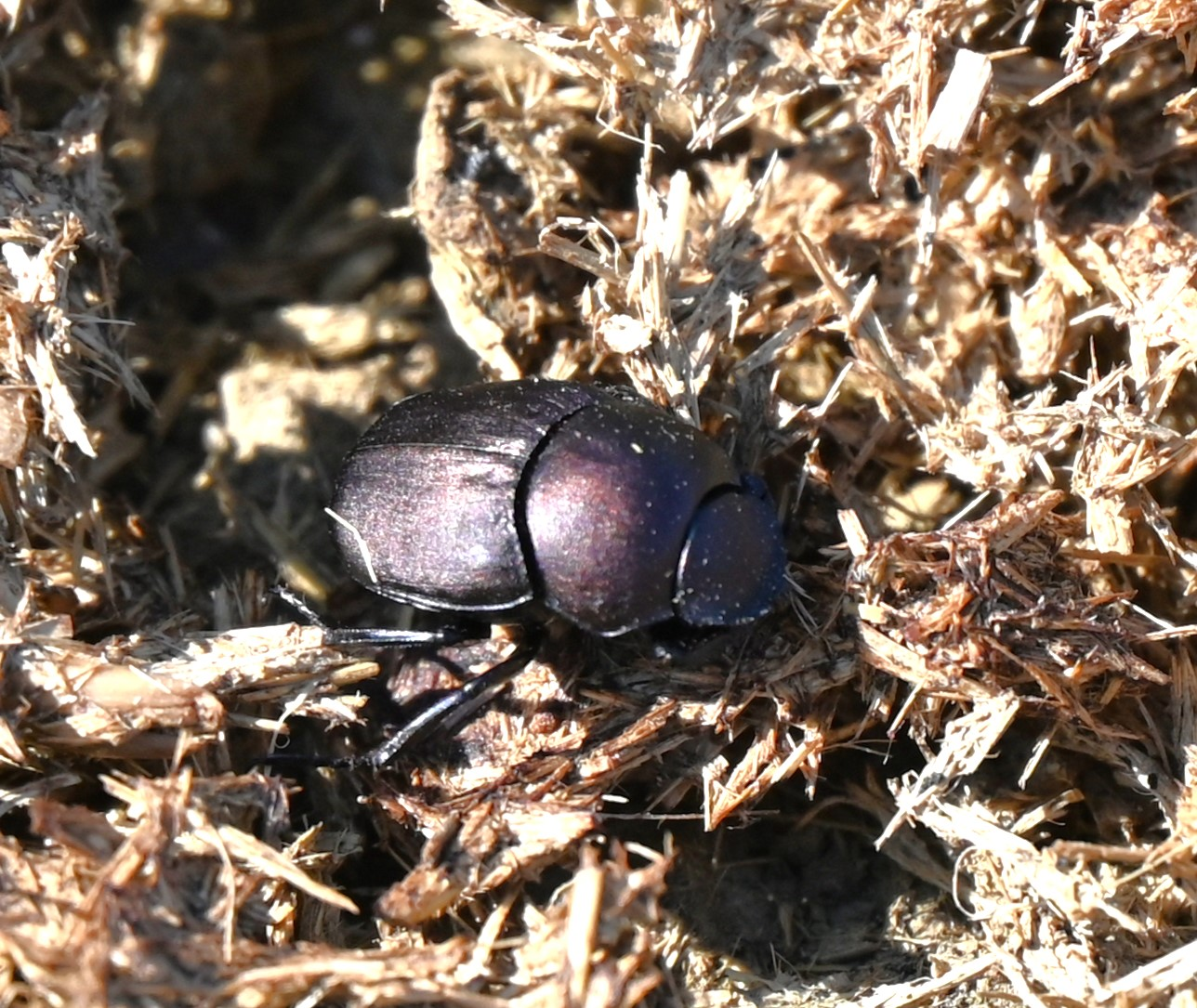
Canthon pilularius in horse dung
