= Sylvicanthon candezei =

Scientific classification
- Kingdom: Animalia
- Phylum: Arthropoda
- Clade: Pancrustacea
- Class: Insecta
- Order: Coleoptera
- Suborder: Polyphaga
- Infraorder: Scarabaeiformia
- Family: Scarabaeidae
- Genus: Sylvicanthon
- Species: S. candezei

Binomial name
- Sylvicanthon candezei (Harold, 1869)

Synonyms
- Canthon candezei Harold, 1869

Species of beetle

Sylvicanthon candezei is a species of beetle of the family Scarabaeidae. It is found in the humid tropical forests from the mouth of the Tapajós River down to the semideciduous forests of southern and south-eastern Amazonia in Brazil.

== Description ==
Adults reach a length of about 5.8–7.6 mm (0.23–0.30 in). The surface of the entire body has very dark shades. The head is predominantly purple with greenish reflections, especially at the centre and the pronotum has a green shine at the centre and a purplish shine on the sides. The elytra are usually dark green with purplish striae, but in some specimens, the elytra are dark blue. The metaventrite is very dark, with coppery or purple reflections and the meso- and metafemora are dark brown or reddish-brown. The pygidium is dark green.

== Etymology ==
The species is named after the Belgian entomologist Ernest Candèze.
