= Canthon machadoi =

Scientific classification
- Kingdom: Animalia
- Phylum: Arthropoda
- Clade: Pancrustacea
- Class: Insecta
- Order: Coleoptera
- Suborder: Polyphaga
- Infraorder: Scarabaeiformia
- Family: Scarabaeidae
- Genus: Canthon
- Species: C. machadoi

Binomial name
- Canthon machadoi (Pereira & Martinez, 1967)

Synonyms
- Glaphyrocanthon machadoi Pereira & Martinez, 1967

Species of beetle

Canthon machadoi is a species of beetle of the family Scarabaeidae. It is found in Brazil (Pernambuco).

== Etymology ==
The species is named after the Brazilian odonatologist Ângelo B.M. Machado, who collected the type series.
