= Sylvicanthon seag =

- Greenish form

Scientific classification
- Kingdom: Animalia
- Phylum: Arthropoda
- Clade: Pancrustacea
- Class: Insecta
- Order: Coleoptera
- Suborder: Polyphaga
- Infraorder: Scarabaeiformia
- Family: Scarabaeidae
- Genus: Sylvicanthon
- Species: S. seag

Binomial name
- Sylvicanthon seag Cupello & Vaz-de-Mello, 2018

Species of beetle

Sylvicanthon seag is a species of beetle of the family Scarabaeidae. It is found in Trinidad, Venezuela, Guyana, Suriname, French Guiana and Brazil.

== Description ==
Adults reach a length of about 6.8–8.5 mm (0.27–0.33 in). Adults exhibit evident geographical variation on the dorsum: in southern populations, the head and pronotum are purple and the elytra are greenish with contrasting striae, while individuals from northern populations have the head purple with greenish reflections and the pronotum and elytra bright green or dark blue, with the elytral striae contrasting. The pronotum usually has purplish reflections, especially on the sides. The metaventrite is dark, with purplish or coppery reflections. Specimens from Trinidad and a few others from Venezuela have greenish reflections at the centre of the disc. The meso- and metafemora are reddish-brown or dark brown, with the base distinctively darker than the apical two-thirds. The pygidium ranges from predominantly coppery with a greenish shine, to the south, to totally greenish or bluish, in northern populations.

== Etymology ==
The species is named after the Société entomologique Antilles-Guyane (SEAG).

Bluish form

Bicolored form
