= Canthon septemmaculatus =

Scientific classification
- Kingdom: Animalia
- Phylum: Arthropoda
- Clade: Pancrustacea
- Class: Insecta
- Order: Coleoptera
- Suborder: Polyphaga
- Infraorder: Scarabaeiformia
- Family: Scarabaeidae
- Genus: Canthon
- Species: C. septemmaculatus

Binomial name
- Canthon septemmaculatus (Latreille, 1812)

Synonyms
- Ateuchus septemmaculatus Latreille, 1812; Canthon septemmaculatus maculipennis Schmidt, 1920; Coprobius badius Burmeister, 1873; Canthon coronatus Perty, 1830; Ateuchus fasciatus Mannerheim, 1828; Canthon cincticolle Lucas, 1859; Ateuchus histrio Le Peletier de Saint-Fargeau & Audinet-Serville, 1828; Canthon septemmaculatus maculicollis Schmidt, 1920; Canthon septemmaculatus niger Schmidt, 1920

Species of beetle

Canthon septemmaculatus is a species of beetle of the family Scarabaeidae. It is found in Argentina, Bolivia, Colombia, Costa Rica, Ecuador, French Guiana, Panama, Paraguay, Peru, Suriname, Uruguay, Venezuela and Brazil.

== Subspecies ==
- Canthon septemmaculatus septemmaculatus (Argentina, Bolivia, Colombia, Costa Rica, Ecuador, French Guiana, Panama, Paraguay, Peru, Suriname, Uruguay, Venezuela, Brazil: Acre, Mato Grosso do Sul, Minas Gerais, Pernambuco, Rondônia, Roraima)
- Canthon septemmaculatus cincticollis Lucas, 1859 (Brazil: Amazonas)
- Canthon septemmaculatus histrio (Le Peletier de Saint-Fargeau & Audinet-Serville, 1828) (Argentina, Colombia, Peru, Brazil: Bahia, Espírito Santo, Goiás, Maranhão, Mato Grosso, Mato Grosso do Sul, Minas Gerais, Pará, Paraná, Pernambuco, Rio de Janeiro, Rio Grande do Sul, Rondônia)
- Canthon septemmaculatus linearis Schmidt, 1920 (Brazil, Colombia, French Guiana, Venezuela)
