= Canthon simplex =

Scientific classification
- Kingdom: Animalia
- Phylum: Arthropoda
- Clade: Pancrustacea
- Class: Insecta
- Order: Coleoptera
- Suborder: Polyphaga
- Infraorder: Scarabaeiformia
- Family: Scarabaeidae
- Tribe: Deltochilini
- Genus: Canthon
- Species: C. simplex

Binomial name
- Canthon simplex Leconte, 1857

Synonyms
- Canthon antiquus Pierce, 1946; Canthon corvinus Harold, 1868; Canthon humeralis Horn, 1870; Canthon militaris Horn, 1870

Species of beetle

Canthon simplex is a species in the beetle family Scarabaeidae. It is found in North America.

== Subspecies ==
These two subspecies belong to the species Canthon simplex:

- Canthon simplex militaris
- Canthon simplex simplex
