= Sylvicanthon mayri =

Scientific classification
- Kingdom: Animalia
- Phylum: Arthropoda
- Clade: Pancrustacea
- Class: Insecta
- Order: Coleoptera
- Suborder: Polyphaga
- Infraorder: Scarabaeiformia
- Family: Scarabaeidae
- Genus: Sylvicanthon
- Species: S. mayri

Binomial name
- Sylvicanthon mayri Cupello & Vaz-de-Mello, 2018

Species of beetle

Sylvicanthon mayri is a species of beetle of the family Scarabaeidae. It is found in western Amazonia, in Colombia, Brazil and Peru.

== Description ==
Adults reach a length of about 6.7–7.3 mm (0.26–0.29 in). The head, pronotum, elytra, metaventrite, and pygidium are dark green or dark blue. The meso- and metafemora are reddish-brown. They occasionally have greenish reflections.

== Natural history ==
They are thought to be coprophagous.

== Etymology ==
The species is named after German-American ornithologist, evolutionary theorist, philosopher and historian of biology Ernst Mayr.
