= Canthon xanthopus =

Scientific classification
- Kingdom: Animalia
- Phylum: Arthropoda
- Clade: Pancrustacea
- Class: Insecta
- Order: Coleoptera
- Suborder: Polyphaga
- Infraorder: Scarabaeiformia
- Family: Scarabaeidae
- Genus: Canthon
- Species: C. xanthopus

Binomial name
- Canthon xanthopus Blanchard, 1846

Synonyms
- Sylvicanthon xanthopus

Species of beetle

Canthon xanthopus is a species of beetle of the family Scarabaeidae. It is found in Bolivia and Brazil (Acre).

== Etymology ==
The species name is derived from Greek xanthos (meaning yellow) and refers to the yellowish coloration of the legs.
