= Canthon praticola =

Scientific classification
- Kingdom: Animalia
- Phylum: Arthropoda
- Clade: Pancrustacea
- Class: Insecta
- Order: Coleoptera
- Suborder: Polyphaga
- Infraorder: Scarabaeiformia
- Family: Scarabaeidae
- Tribe: Deltochilini
- Genus: Canthon
- Species: C. praticola

Binomial name
- Canthon praticola Leconte, 1859

Synonyms
- Canthon vetustus Pierce, 1946

Species of beetle

Canthon praticola is a species in the beetle family Scarabaeidae. It is found in North America.
