= Sylvicanthon attenboroughi =

Scientific classification
- Kingdom: Animalia
- Phylum: Arthropoda
- Clade: Pancrustacea
- Class: Insecta
- Order: Coleoptera
- Suborder: Polyphaga
- Infraorder: Scarabaeiformia
- Family: Scarabaeidae
- Genus: Sylvicanthon
- Species: S. attenboroughi

Binomial name
- Sylvicanthon attenboroughi Cupello & Vaz-de-Mello, 2018

Species of beetle

Sylvicanthon attenboroughi is a species of beetle of the family Scarabaeidae. It is found in southern Amazonia in Brazil and Peru.

== Description ==
Adults reach a length of about 7.2–9.6 mm (0.28–0.38 in). The entire body has very dark tonalities. The head and pronotum are dark purple and the elytra are dark green or dark blue. When green, the striae are dark blue and slightly contrasting with the rest of the tegument. The metaventrite is black and the meso- and metafemora are orangish-brown, reddish-brown, or dark brown, with the base distinctly darker than at least the apical two-thirds. The pygidium is usually coppery, occasionally with greenish reflections.

== Etymology ==
The species is named after the British naturalist and broadcaster Sir David Attenborough.
