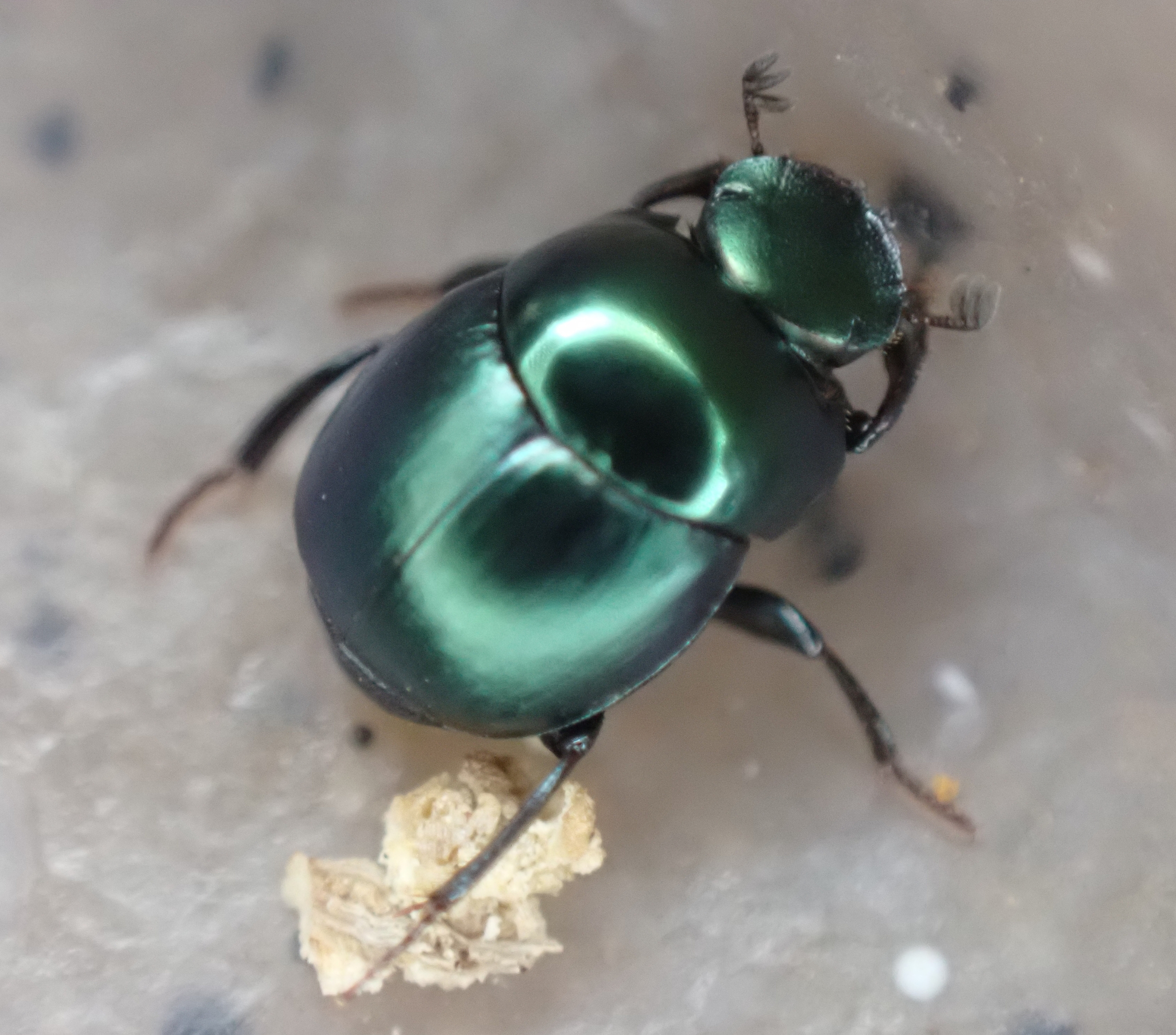

Scientific classification
- Kingdom: Animalia
- Phylum: Arthropoda
- Clade: Pancrustacea
- Class: Insecta
- Order: Coleoptera
- Suborder: Polyphaga
- Infraorder: Scarabaeiformia
- Family: Scarabaeidae
- Genus: Canthon
- Species: C. viridis

Binomial name
- Canthon viridis (Palisot de Beauvois, 1805)

Synonyms
- Ateuchus obsoletus Say, 1823; Canthon metallicus Sturm, 1843; Onthophagus viridicatus Say, 1835

= Canthon viridis =

Species of beetle

Canthon viridis is a species in the beetle family Scarabaeidae. It is found in North America.
