= Boreocanthon =

Scientific classification
- Kingdom: Animalia
- Phylum: Arthropoda
- Class: Insecta
- Order: Coleoptera
- Suborder: Polyphaga
- Infraorder: Scarabaeiformia
- Family: Scarabaeidae
- Genus: Boreocanthon; Halffter, 1958

Type species
- Ateuchus ebenus Say, 1823

Diversity
- 13 species

Genus of scarab beetles

Boreocanthon is a genus of ball-rolling dung beetles in the family Scarabaeidae. They are endemic to North America, occurring from southern Canada to central Mexico.

== Species ==
Thirteen species are currently recognized.

- Boreocanthon ateuchiceps Bates, 1887
- Boreocanthon coahuilensis Howden, 1966
- Boreocanthon depressipennis LeConte, 1859
- Boreocanthon ebenus Say, 1823
- Boreocanthon forreri Bates, 1887
- Boreocanthon halffteri Edmonds, 2022
- Boreocanthon integricollis Schaeffer, 1915
- Boreocanthon lecontei Harold, 1868
- Boreocanthon melanus Robinson, 1948
- Boreocanthon praticola LeConte, 1859
- Boreocanthon probus Germar, 1823
- Boreocanthon puncticollis LeConte, 1866
- Boreocanthon simplex LeConte, 1857
