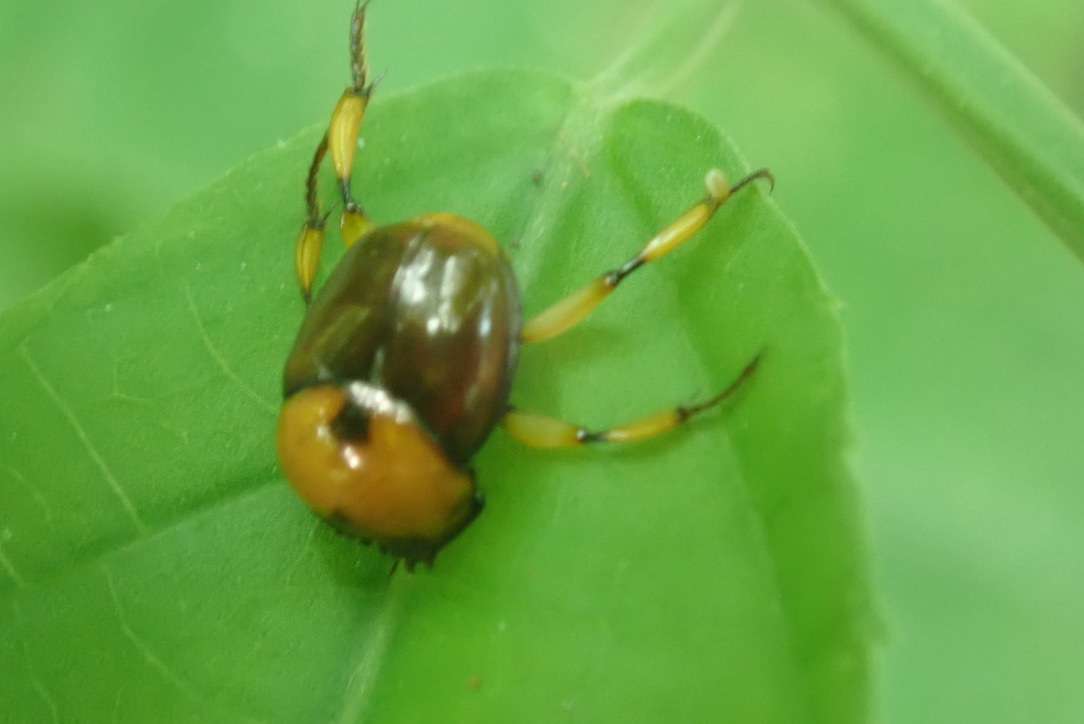

Scientific classification
- Kingdom: Animalia
- Phylum: Arthropoda
- Clade: Pancrustacea
- Class: Insecta
- Order: Coleoptera
- Suborder: Polyphaga
- Infraorder: Scarabaeiformia
- Family: Scarabaeidae
- Genus: Canthon
- Species: C. angustatus

Binomial name
- Canthon angustatus Harold, 1867

= Canthon angustatus =

Species of beetle

Canthon angustatus is a species of tumblebug from the genus Canthon. It occurs across North, Central, and South America, from Mexico to Peru. The species was originally described by Edgar von Harold in 1867

== Sources ==
- Berliner entomologische Zeitschrift / herausgegeben von dem Entomologischen Vereine in Berlin. Vol. Jahrg.12 (1868). Berliner Entomologischer Verein. 1868. p. 63.
- La biodiversidad en Chiapas : estudio de estado. Vol. II. Comisión Nacional para el Conocimiento y Uso de la Biodiversidad (CONABIO). 2013. p. 211.
- Biologia Centrali-Americana :zoology, botany and archaeology. Vol. Insecta. Coleoptera. v. 2. pt. 2. Pectinicornia and Lamellicornia by H.W. Bates (1886-1890). Published for the editors by R. H. Porter]. 1890. p. 28.
- Congrès international d'entomologie : [proceedings]. Vol. 17th Abstracts (1984). Hayez. 1984. p. 337.
- Entomologische Arbeiten aus dem Museum G. Frey Tutzing bei München. Vol. Bd.15 (1964). Eigenverlag. 1964. p. 669.
- Psyche. Vol. 2012:pt.2. Cambridge Entomological Club. 2012. p. Page 4.

Media related to Canthon angustatus at Wikimedia Commons
