= Canthon quadriguttatus =

Scientific classification
- Kingdom: Animalia
- Phylum: Arthropoda
- Clade: Pancrustacea
- Class: Insecta
- Order: Coleoptera
- Suborder: Polyphaga
- Infraorder: Scarabaeiformia
- Family: Scarabaeidae
- Genus: Canthon
- Species: C. quadriguttatus

Binomial name
- Canthon quadriguttatus (Olivier, 1789)

Synonyms
- Canthon elegans Castelnau, 1840; Choeridium elegans Castelnau, 1840; Copris obliquatus Voet 1806; Scarabaeus quadriguttatus Olivier, 1789

Species of beetle

Canthon quadriguttatus is a species of Scarabaeidae or scarab beetles. It is found in Brazil, Colombia and Suriname.
