= Canthon smaragdulus =

- Canthon smaragdulus smaragdulus
- Canthon smaragdulus subviridis

Scientific classification
- Kingdom: Animalia
- Phylum: Arthropoda
- Clade: Pancrustacea
- Class: Insecta
- Order: Coleoptera
- Suborder: Polyphaga
- Infraorder: Scarabaeiformia
- Family: Scarabaeidae
- Genus: Canthon
- Species: C. smaragdulus

Binomial name
- Canthon smaragdulus (Fabricius, 1781)

Synonyms
- Scarabaeus smaragdulus Fabricius, 1781; Canthon speculifer Castelnau, 1840

Species of beetle

Canthon smaragdulus is a species of beetle of the family Scarabaeidae. It is found in Argentina, Paraguay, French Guiana and Brazil (Ceará, Pernambuco, Bahia, Alagoas, Minas Gerais, Espírito Santo, Rio de Janeiro, São Paulo, Paraná, Santa Catarina, Mato Grosso do Sul).

== Description ==
Adults reach a length of about 9–14 mm (0.35–0.55 in). The dorsal and ventral surface are green to blue, always with a blue metallic sheen.

== Subspecies ==
- Canthon smaragdulus smaragdulus (Argentina, Paraguay, Brazil: Rio de Janeiro, São Paulo, Paraná, Santa Catarina, Mato Grosso do Sul)
- Canthon smaragdulus subviridis Schmidt, 1922 (French Guiana, Brazil: Ceará, Pernambuco, Bahia, Alagoas, Minas Gerais, Espírito Santo, Rio de Janeiro, São Paulo)

== Gallery ==
Living specimen
