= Canthon zuninoi =

Conservation status
- Vulnerable (IUCN 3.1)

Scientific classification
- Kingdom: Animalia
- Phylum: Arthropoda
- Clade: Pancrustacea
- Class: Insecta
- Order: Coleoptera
- Suborder: Polyphaga
- Infraorder: Scarabaeiformia
- Family: Scarabaeidae
- Genus: Canthon
- Species: C. zuninoi

Binomial name
- Canthon zuninoi Rivera-Cervantes & Halffter, 1999

Species of beetle

Canthon zuninoi is a species of Scarabaeidae or scarab beetles. It is found in Mexico.
