= Sylvicanthon aequinoctialis =

Scientific classification
- Kingdom: Animalia
- Phylum: Arthropoda
- Clade: Pancrustacea
- Class: Insecta
- Order: Coleoptera
- Suborder: Polyphaga
- Infraorder: Scarabaeiformia
- Family: Scarabaeidae
- Genus: Sylvicanthon
- Species: S. aequinoctialis

Binomial name
- Sylvicanthon aequinoctialis (Harold, 1868)

Synonyms
- Canthon aequinoctialis Harold, 1868

Species of beetle

Sylvicanthon aequinoctialis is a species of beetle of the family Scarabaeidae. It is found in tropical forests from Honduras to northern Colombia.

== Description ==
Adults reach a length of about 8.7–12.3 mm (0.34–0.48 in). The entire body surface is bright and glossy, including the surface of the pygidium. The head, pronotum, elytra and pygidium are usually purple, blue, or, occasionally, green. The metaventrite is dark green or dark blue and the meso- and metafemora are dark brown and, in general, have greenish reflections.

== Natural history ==
They have been reported feeding on both dung and carrion.

== Etymology ==
The species name is derived from Latin aequinoctialis (meaning equinox or equinoctial) and probably refers to the type locality, a region crossed by the Equator.
