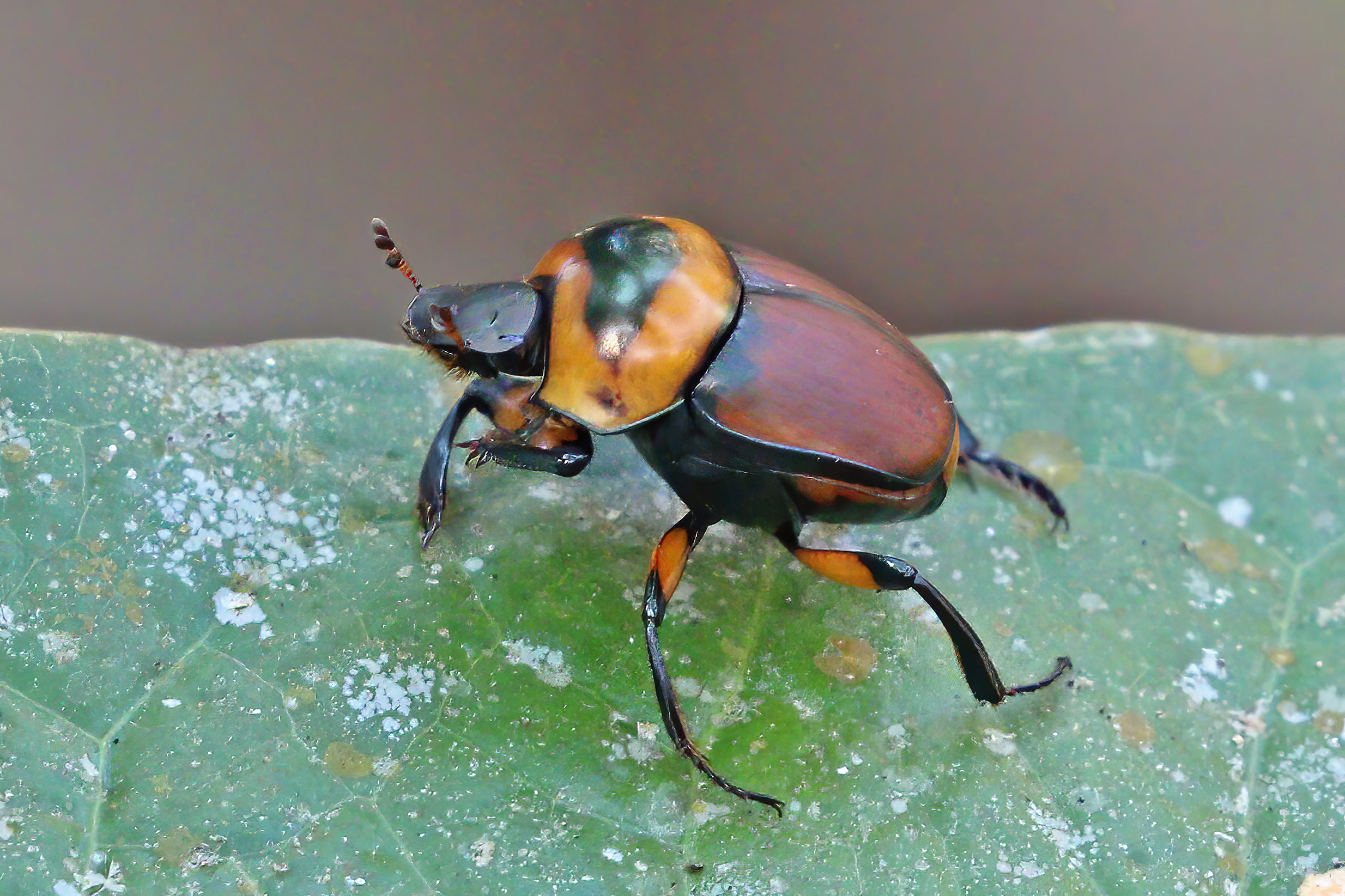
- Canthon histrio

Scientific classification
- Kingdom: Animalia
- Phylum: Arthropoda
- Clade: Pancrustacea
- Class: Insecta
- Order: Coleoptera
- Suborder: Polyphaga
- Infraorder: Scarabaeiformia
- Family: Scarabaeidae
- Subfamily: Scarabaeinae
- Tribe: Deltochilini
- Genus: Canthon; Hoffmannsegg 1817

Subgenera and species
- 3 subgenera: Boreocanthon; Canthon; Glaphyrocanthon; and about 300 species see text for about 10 selected ones

Synonyms
- Canthomoechus Pereira & Martinez, 1959; Coeloscelis Reiche, 1841; Coprobius Latreille, 1829; Geocanthon Pereira & Martinez, 1956; Glaphyrocanthon Martínez, 1948; Goniocanthon Pereira & Martinez, 1956; Hyboma Laporte, 1840; Nesocanthon Pereira & Martinez, 1956; Paedohyboma Kolbe, 1893; Peltecanthon Pereira, 1953; Petraechma Blanchard, 1843; Pseudocanthon Bates, 1887; Trichocanthon Pereira & Martinez, 1959

= Canthon =

Genus of beetles

Canthon, the tumblebugs, is a Nearctic-Neotropical genus of Scarabaeidae or scarab beetles in the superfamily Scarabaeoidea.

== Selected species ==
- Canthon aberrans Harold, 1868
- Canthon acutiformis Balthasar, 1939
- Canthon acutoides Schmidt, 1922
- Canthon acutus Harold, 1868
- Canthon aequinoctialis Harold 1868
- Canthon angularis Harold, 1868
- Canthon angustatus Harold, 1867
- Canthon histrio Lepeletier & Serville, 1828
- Canthon quadriguttatus Olivier, 1789
- Canthon smaragdulus Fabricius, 1781
- Canthon zuninoi Rivera-Cervantes & Halffter, 1999

Names brought to synonymy

- Canthon elegans (Laporte, 1840), a synonym for Canthon quadriguttatus Olivier, 1789

== See also ==
- List of Canthon species
