= Prairie dog (disambiguation) =

A prairie dog is a rodent native to North America. Prairie dog may also refer to:

== Animals ==
- Black-tailed prairie dog
- Gunnison's prairie dog
- Mexican prairie dog
- Utah prairie dog
- White-tailed prairie dog

== Places ==
- Prairie Dog State Park, a state park in Kansas
- Prairie Dog Town Fork Red River, a branch of the Red River of Texas
- Prairie Dog Township, Decatur County, Kansas
- Prairie Dog Township, Harlan County, Nebraska

== See also ==
- Prairie Dog (album), an album by Duke Pearson
- Prairie Dog Central Railway, a railway in Winnipeg, Manitoba, Canada
