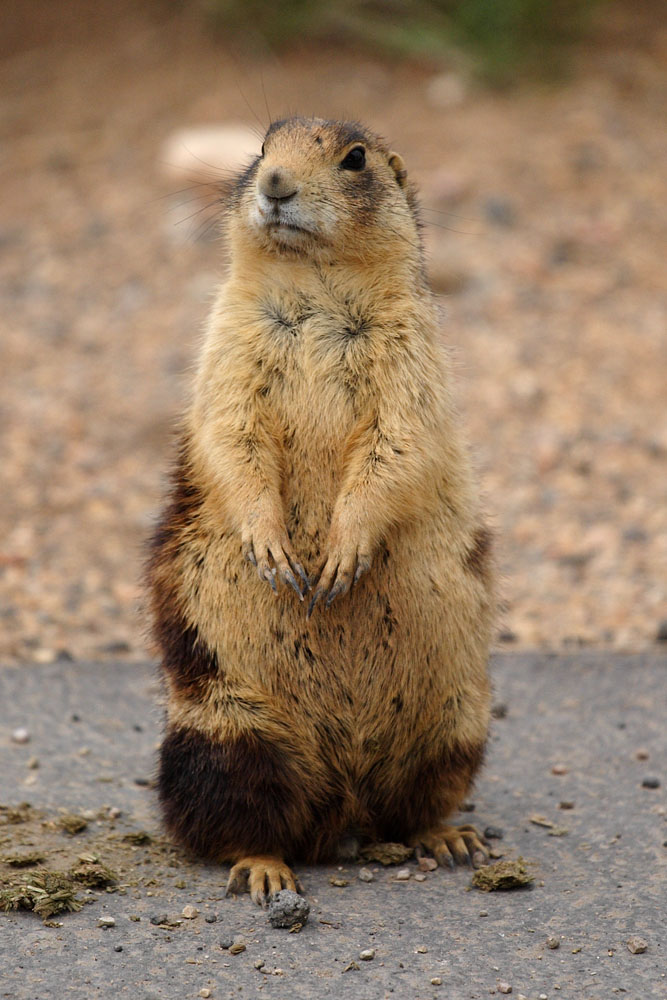

Conservation status
- Endangered (IUCN 3.1)

- Imperiled (NatureServe)

Scientific classification
- Kingdom: Animalia
- Phylum: Chordata
- Class: Mammalia
- Order: Rodentia
- Family: Sciuridae
- Genus: Cynomys
- Species: C. parvidens

Binomial name
- Cynomys parvidens J. A. Allen, 1905
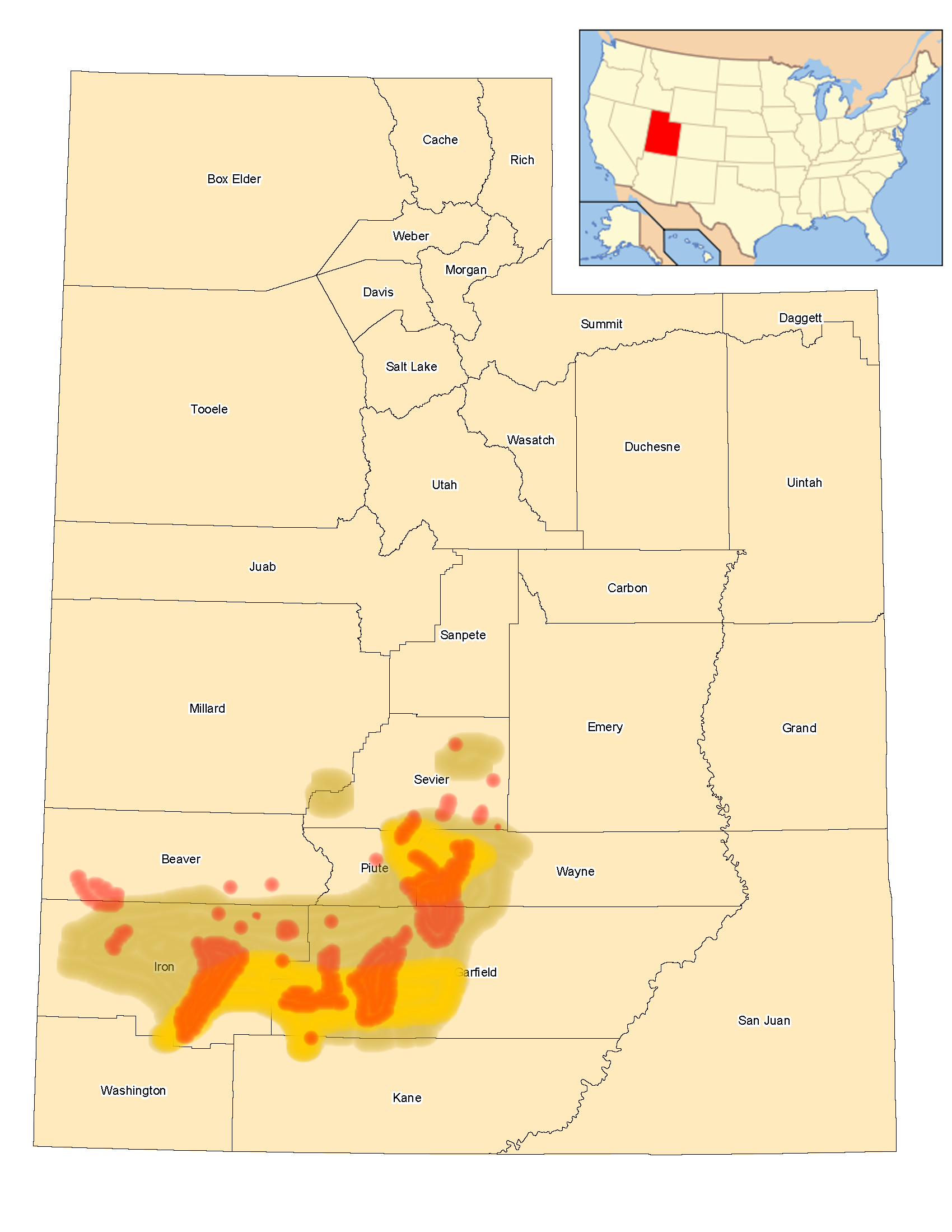
- Utah prairie dog range in 1920 (ochre), 1970 (yellow) and 1991 (red)

= Utah prairie dog =

Species of rodent

The Utah prairie dog (Cynomys parvidens) is the smallest species of prairie dog and is endemic to the south-central steppes of the American state of Utah.

The species is listed in the IUCN Red List of Threatened Species with a status of Endangered. Because of this, it is a protected species; the prairie dog faces various threats - the most dangerous being habitat loss and diseases.

== Description ==
=== Appearance ===
The fur of Utah prairie dogs is multicolored, which consists of black, brown, and dark brown at the tip. Their faces have dark brown cheeks and whitish tone around their chins and mouth. Utah prairie dogs also have distinctly clay colored proximal tail parts and dorsum, as well as dark eyebrows. In terms of taxonomy, there are two subgenera of prairie dogs: "black-tailed" prairie dogs and "white-tailed" prairie dogs. Utah prairie dogs are a member of the latter of the two groups and the subgenus Leucrossuromys. Utah prairie dogs may have been part of the interbreeding species of white-tailed prairie dogs but their differences are a result of what is known as allopatric speciation – separation of a species by physiographic and ecological barriers.

=== Body size ===
The total body length of typical adult Utah prairie dogs ranges from 30.5 to 36 cm (12.0 to 14.2 in) with 3 to 6 cm (1.2 to 2.4 in) of tail. Adult prairie dogs weigh about 0.77 to 1.41 kg (1.7 to 3.1 lb) in males, and 0.64 to 1.13 kg (1.4 to 2.5 lb) in females. Utah prairie dogs exhibit sexual dimorphism; males are 27% bigger than females, although the ratio varies by season. Their body weights can span from 0.3 to 0.9 kg (0.66 to 1.98 lb) in the spring, and 0.5 to 1.5 kg (1.1 to 3.3 lb) in the summer for males. In 1952, Durant noted that the Utah prairie dog has a skull larger than that of the Gunnison's prairie dog.

== Ecology ==
=== Range ===
Utah prairie dogs are only found in the southern part of Utah. They have the most constrained range when compared to the other four species of prairie dogs in the United States (Gunnison's prairie dog, Mexican prairie dog, the white-tailed prairie dog, and the black-tailed prairie dog) - none of which overlap geographic territories. Today the Utah prairie dog is only found in the central and southwestern part of Utah in Beaver, Garfield, Iron, Kane, Piute, Sevier, and Wayne Counties. However, it was recorded that Utah prairie dogs existed as far north as Nephi, as far south as the pine fir forests of Bryce Canyon National Park, and Aquarius Plateau to the east in 1920, but the number declined from the 1920s to 1970s by 87%. This reduction was thought to be a result of human settlers who caused overgrazing of soil, and thus catalyzed the invasion of shrub to the grass land.

=== Habitat ===
Utah prairie dogs prefer swale land area with abundant herbaceous plants. They build burrows on soil with adequate drain ability, depth to protect themselves from predators (a minimum of 3.3 feet (1.0 m) deep), and appropriately colored soil for camouflage purposes. Other environmental factors such as temperature influence the building process, such as insulation prospects. Agricultural properties often provide Utah prairie dogs with suitable habitats, but when populations get too dense, outbreaks of plagues become common (of which fleas are the typical vectors) and can demolish entire colonies.

=== Diet ===
Utah prairie dogs are mainly herbivores, but they sometimes choose small insects, such as cicadas. They highly prefer grasses and forbs but they also do consume flowers on shrubs. Utah prairie dogs choose only a few species of grasses that are native to their surrounding soil. Eating green vegetation and forbs of high quality allows them to obtain large quantities of protein and energy, which is critical for activities such as lactation and hibernation.

=== Predators ===
The primary predators of Utah prairie dogs include badgers (Taxidea taxis), many species of raptors (Aquila chrysaetos, Buteo spp.), coyotes (Canis latrans), snakes (Pituophus spp., Crotalus spp.), and long-tailed weasels (Mustela frenata). However, predators do not pose a significant threat to the numbers of prairie dogs in well-established colonies.

=== Ecological impact ===
Utah prairie dogs act as a keystone species for their ecosystem – they are responsible for enhancing landscape heterogeneity, mitigating the height of local vegetation, mixing soil by burrowing (which in turn aids in the nitrogen uptake of plants), and altering the chemistry of the soil by making it more porous and allowing for precipitation and organic matter to penetrate the ground. Other animals including rabbits, badgers, ground squirrels, and burrowing owls rely on the burrows and conditions that Utah prairie dogs generate.

== Behavior ==
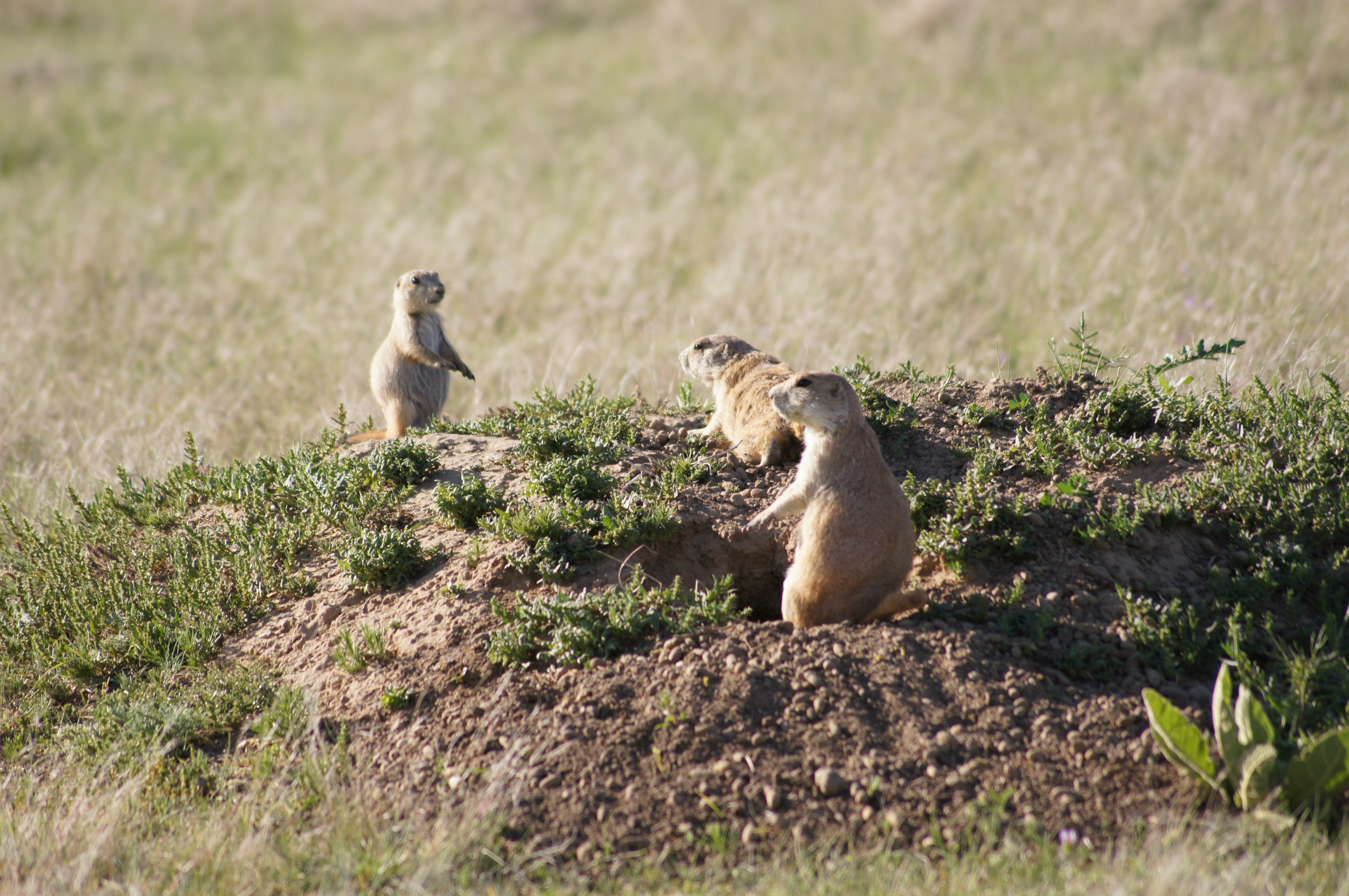
Typical prairie dog town, entrance to tunnel

They build extensive "towns" of tunnels and chambers. Each town's population is the members of an extended prairie dog family group called a "clan", which comprises an adult male, a few adult females, and their juveniles, who work to maintain boundaries of geographic territories. They forage from dawn to dusk. Prairie dogs are particularly social animals and demonstrate communal behavior. They hibernate during the harshest months of the winter for about four to six months and emerge by late February or early March, and occasionally during mild conditions. Adult male prairie dogs begin hibernation around August or September and their female counterparts do the same a few weeks afterwards. Younger generations go into hibernation one to two months later, towards the end of November.

=== Reproduction ===
Utah prairie dogs show polyandrous behavior, and lay only one litter per year, which generally consists of one to eight pups, with a mean of 3.88 pups. The size of litters directly correlate with maternal body mass. However, approximately twenty percent of the litter may be eradicated due to males cannibalizing juvenile Utah prairie dogs. The gestation period of a female Utah prairie dog is approximately 28 days. The breeding occurs generally from mid-March through early April. Female estrus occurs for just one day, for only a few hours during this breeding season. Nevertheless, this atypical cycle is sustainable because on average, ninety-seven percent of adult females are in conditions conducive to breeding and thus produce litters. The life expectancy of Utah prairie dogs is around five years.

== Conservation ==
=== Conservation status ===
The species appears in the IUCN Red List of Threatened Species, with a status of Endangered, last assessed on July 11, 2016.

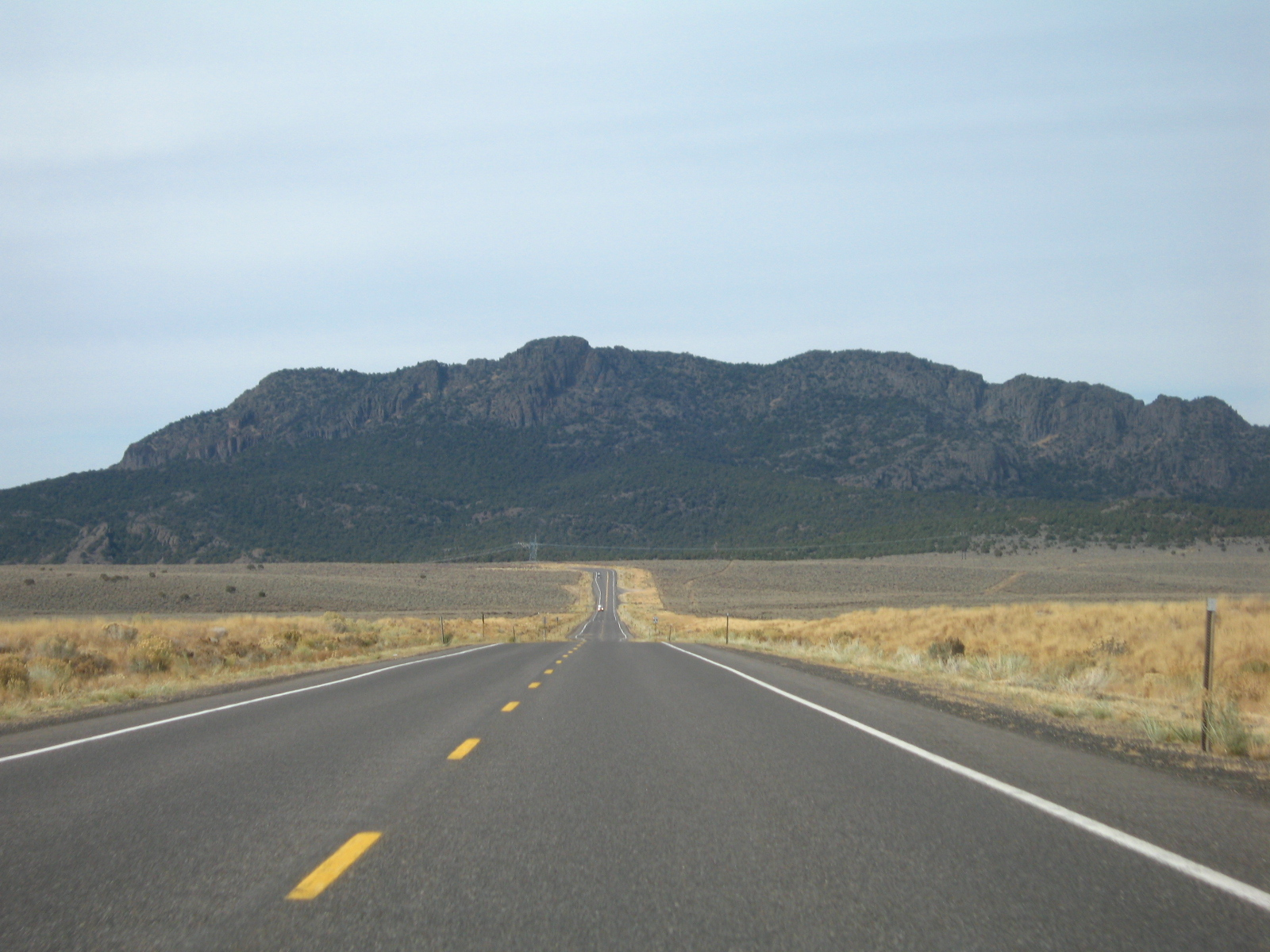
Utah State Route 20 through Buckskin Valley in Iron County

The Utah prairie dog is listed as a threatened species by the United States Fish and Wildlife Service. They have also been considered federally threatened since the year 1984. They are protected under the 1973 Endangered Species Act (ESA). In 1920, there were approximately 95,000 Utah prairie dogs, but over a span of around 50 years, the population was decimated by an estimated 50%. Reports have shown that this was a result of population control programs that were instituted in the 1920s, unregulated shooting, and poisoning. Other factors that contributed to this drastic reduction include diseases, increased aridity, overgrazing of habitats and habitat loss, epizootic infections, cultivated agriculture, invasive plant species, climate change, poaching, the exploration and development of energy resources, off-highway vehicle recreation, fire management, and urban development. In 1972, studies estimated a population of 3,300 Utah prairie dogs in 37 colonies. Studies by the Utah Division of Wildlife Resources in spring 2004 reported 4,022 Utah prairie dogs, a number believed to reflect half of the total current population. The Utah prairie dog can do significant damage to farms by digging holes and eating crops, drawing the ire of Utah farmers, who have used poison liberally to destroy the animals. This is a major reason for the population decline, though there are other factors, such as "land development, deteriorating rangeland health, the encroachment of woody vegetation, sylvatic plague, [bubonic plague], and drought."

=== Conservation efforts ===
Conservation efforts include encouraging landowners to improve the health of their rangelands, and compensating farmers who set aside areas the prairie dogs may use. Conservationists also recommend seeding as a method of rangeland restoration, prescribed burning of vegetation, control of noxious weeds, and general brush management to preserve Utah prairie dog habitats and food sources. The United States Fish and Wildlife Service, along with the Utah Ecological Services Field Office, have published recovery plans with varying proposed strategies to protect Utah prairie dog populations. Some descriptions of such plans that have yet to be implemented include monitoring and developing a database for plague incidents, developing methods of natural disturbance responses (such as fire or drought), creating a volunteer-based stewardship program with the intention of educating and informing citizens, and establishing educational kiosks and Utah prairie dog viewing sites for the public. Additional conservation plans that are ongoing include those in which private landowners who contractually agree to habitat management or restoration receive financial and market-based incentives, endowment funds for the management and administration of protected properties are established, vegetation treatment in tactical areas are implemented, and strategies to further funding for outreach programs are developed. Many of these expensive recovery actions are anticipated to generate full recovery of the Utah prairie dog species by the decade of 2040, if properly adhered to proposed schedules.
