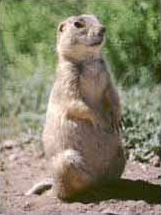

Conservation status
- Least Concern (IUCN 3.1)

Scientific classification
- Kingdom: Animalia
- Phylum: Chordata
- Class: Mammalia
- Order: Rodentia
- Family: Sciuridae
- Genus: Cynomys
- Species: C. gunnisoni

Binomial name
- Cynomys gunnisoni (Baird, 1855)
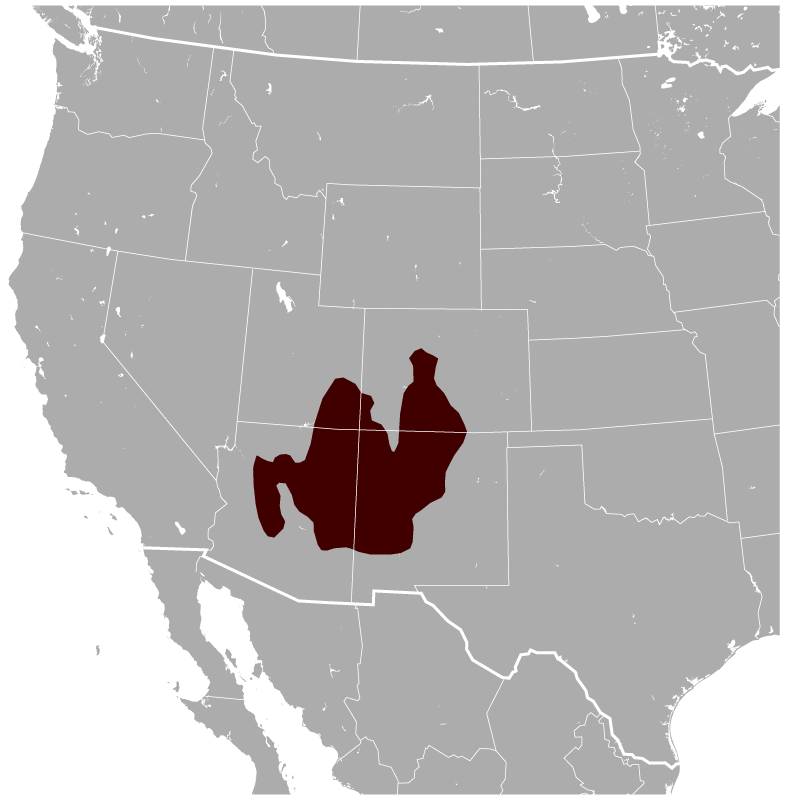
- Gunnison's Prairie Dog range

= Gunnison's prairie dog =

Species of rodent

Gunnison's prairie dog (Cynomys gunnisoni) is one of five species of prairie dog. This species belongs to the squirrel family of rodents, and are predominantly related to the North American and Eurasian ground squirrels. Gunnison's prairie dogs are primarily distributed in the Four Corners region of the United States.

== Description ==
Gunnison's prairie dogs are 12 to 14 inches (30 to 36 cm) in length and have tails that measure 1.25 to 2.25 inches (3.2 to 5.7 cm). This species weighs from 1.5 to 2.5 lb (0.68 to 1.13 kg). On average, males are larger in size than females. Gunnison's prairie dogs have 22 teeth and five pairs of mammary glands.

The Gunnison's prairie dog, C. gunnisoni, is the only prairie dog species that has 40 chromosomes. The other four species — black-tailed, white-tailed, Utah, and Mexican prairie dogs — have 50 chromosomes. Their coats are yellow-toned buff merged with black-colored hairs. The upper head, sides of the cheek, and eyebrows are distinctly darker than the rest of the body. Their tails are mostly white with grayish-white ends, and the tips are light gray.

The Gunnison's prairie dogs go through two yearly periodic moults during spring and fall. In spring, the shedding begins from the head to the rear tail. The process is reversed in the winter, when it starts from the tail and proceeds to the head.

A distinguishing physical trait of the prairie dog is the placement of their eyes. They are situated on the sides of their heads, giving them a wide peripheral range of sight. This allows them to spot predators more easily and react as quickly as possible.

== Diet ==
The Gunnison's prairie dog typically feeds during the day, when they are most active. Their diet usually consists of grasses, herbs, and leaves. During the spring, they feed on newly grown shrubs. In the summer, they mainly consume seeds. Food is scarce in winter and fall. During these months, they feed on stems and roots, and stored food accumulated in the warmer months. While most prairie dogs are typically herbivores, some eat insects.

== Habitat ==
Three-quarters of the population of Gunnison's prairie dogs are located in Arizona and New Mexico. They can be found in high desert, grasslands, meadows, hillsides, broad alluvial valleys and floodplains. They are often found in shrubs, such as rabbitbrush, sagebrush, and saltbrush. This species of prairie dogs resides in habitats ranging from 6,000–10,000 feet (1,800–3,000 m) in altitude, although they have been recorded at altitudes as high as 12,000 feet (3,700 m).

The sagebrush ecosystem is dependent on these animals. As a result of the Gunnison's prairie dogs burrowing, the soil is freshened, organic matter is added, and increased water penetration is able to occur. Their burrowing also creates habitats and exposes food sources for other creatures.

== Social structure ==
Gunnison's prairie dogs live in colonies of up to several hundred individuals. Each colony is subdivided into smaller territories occupied by communal groups or solitary individuals. These communities of prairie dogs vary from two to 19 individuals and may be composed of a single male/single female, single male/multiple females, or multiple males/multiple females. Arrangement of the communities or social groups may be linked with the distribution of food resources. The territories inhabited by the Gunnison's prairie dog are defended by social groups, and violent behavior is common toward other animals who are not members. These prairie dogs often feed in feebly defended peripheral sections of territories that belong to other groups, but when members from different groups meet in these common feeding areas, conflicts can arise, with one prairie dog chasing the other back to its territory.

== Behavior ==
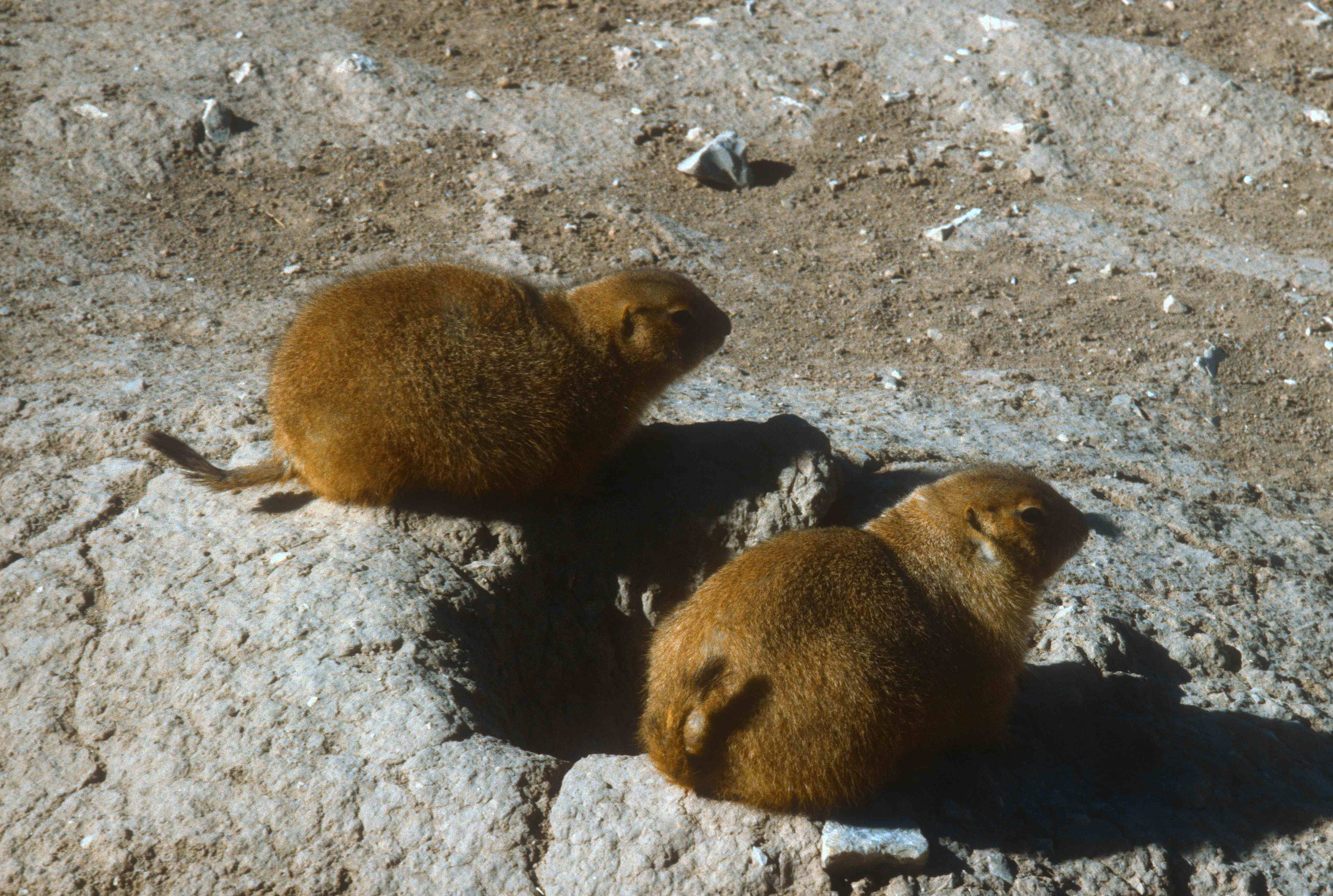
Gunnison's Prairie Dog

All prairie dogs, including the Gunnison's prairie dog, are diurnal. This means they exert the most activity in the early morning and late afternoon. During warm weather, the highest activity levels occur at about 9 a.m., and from 2 p.m. to about an hour before the sunsets. When the temperature starts to cool, they become more active during the day. When it snows or rains, the prairie dogs will stay underground.

Their above-ground activities include making social contact, being aware of their surroundings and predators, grooming, burrowing, etc. Their main activity above ground is feeding. Although Gunnison's prairie dogs are considered to be less social than black-tailed prairie dogs, they are considered to be more social than the white-tailed prairie dogs. Studies have shown female Gunnison's prairie dogs are far more likely to engage in friendly social contact with other prairie dogs, and males are more likely to create conflict.

With the exception of two species, the black-tailed and Mexican, prairie dogs hibernate. During the winter, the Gunnison's prairie dog stays underground for long periods of time without food or water, using physiological adaptations to control their metabolism. Their bodies also rely on their stored body fat during hibernation. After hibernation, they become active again around March or April. This species is most active during the months of April through October.

== Communication ==
The Gunnison's prairie dog communicates through forms of physical contact, such as cuddling and kissing, and through vocalization, such as a warning bark. Their vocal communication is the foundation to their survival and structure of their community. Their system of vocal communication is complex and may be one of the most advanced forms of communication of all-natural animal languages. Con Slobodchikoff, a Northern Arizona University biology professor, has been researching the behavior of prairie dogs for 20 years, and states prairie dogs "have one of the most advanced forms of natural language known to science."

The bark is a combination of one or two high-pitched audible syllables, with the second syllable lower and deeper. Prairie dogs have a unique sound to identify each of various predators. They also have different barks for warning and "all-clear" signals. Researchers and experts have been able to classify up to 11 distinct warning call the prairie dog uses to communicate. Also, females with offspring are more likely to give off a warning bark than males.

The warning signal is their primary source of survival because it alerts the other prairie dogs to nearby danger. It can last for up to 30 minutes and can be heard nearly a mile away. As danger approaches, the intensity of the signal increases, and it ends after the prairie dog has entered its safe haven.

Studies have also shown prairie dogs can distinguish between the different colors of clothing people wear, and between people expressing threatening and nonthreatening behavior.

== Breeding and life span ==
The Gunnison's prairie dog mating season begins in mid-March and lasts until mid-May. A female is able to reproduce at the age of one year. When food availability is scarce during the mating season, they may wait another year before breeding. Females can only engage in sexual intercourse for a single day during the mating season, and can mate with approximately five males, depending on the population density of their habitat. Gestation lasts, on average, 30 days. Copulation usually occurs underground. Females produce one litter per year of four to five pups.

Once the pups are born, the mother Gunnison's prairie dog nurses the pups for about 30 to 40 days. During this time, the young pups remain safely in the nesting burrow located underground. Towards the end of lactation, the young are able to come out above ground; they must learn how to separate themselves from their mothers and survive on their own. As soon as the mother is done caring her young, she relocates herself to another burrow, leaving her now-independent young behind. Not too long after, they scatter to other vacant burrows. A high percentage of female Gunnison's prairie dogs settle close to their birth territories for their entire lifetimes, whereas a significantly low percentage of the males stay close to their birth territories for longer than one year.

The life span of a Gunnison's prairie dog is generally three to five years in the wild, but they can live up to eight years of age.

The population of the Gunnison's prairie dog is declining drastically due to three major factors: shootings, plague cycles, and poisoning. Many concerned groups of people are requesting that the Gunnison's Prairie Dog be listed under the federal Endangered Species Act.

== Predators and disease ==
Predators include badgers, wolves, coyotes, bobcats, black-footed ferrets, weasels, golden eagles and large hawks. Humans also affect prairie dog populations; for example, some ranchers implement poisoning programs to eliminate them.

Plague (disease), caused by Yersinia pestis and transmitted via fleas, can wipe out numerous individuals of the prairie dog populations.
