= Con Slobodchikoff =

American ethologist

- Born: April 23, 1944 (age 82); Shanghai, China
- Education: University of California, Berkeley
- Known for: referential communication in prairie dogs
- Scientific career
- Institutions: Northern Arizona University

Constantine "Con" Slobodchikoff (born April 23, 1944) is an animal behaviorist and conservation biologist. He is a professor at Northern Arizona University where he studies referential communication, using Gunnison's prairie dogs (Cynomys gunnisoni) as a model species. Much of his recent research has shown a complex communicative ability of the Gunnison prairie dog alarm calls. In early 2008 he formed the Animal Language Institute to create a place where people can find and share research in animal communication, including language.

== Background ==
He was born in Shanghai, China, to Russian émigré parents. The family arrived in the United States on December 5, 1955, and settled in San Francisco. He received an A.A. degree from City College of San Francisco in 1964, and a B.S. in 1966 and Ph.D. degree in 1971, both from the University of California, Berkeley. He subsequently joined the biology faculty of Northern Arizona University, where he was a tenured professor. He also was a Fulbright Fellow and a visiting professor at Kenyatta University in Kenya in 1983.

== Research ==
=== Beetles ===
His initial research involved the behavior and ecology of tenebrionid beetles and their response to vertebrate predators.

=== Prairie dogs ===
In the mid-1980s, he shifted his research to prairie dog social behavior and communication. He and his students discovered that prairie dogs use a sophisticated alarm system to specify a predator's type, size, shape, and color. Crucially, their communication exhibits displacement—the ability to discuss absent subjects—a linguistic process previously thought unique to humans. In addition, his work with prairie dogs shows they also have different escape behaviors in response to the specific predators identified in the calls of other prairie dogs, even when the predator is not visible or scented, i.e., based purely on recorded calls. His research with prairie dogs also helps to explain why animals have social behavior. Because these animals form a colony, they form a set of different social groups, which apparently exist for other reasons besides mating and may be a way to take advantage of limited resources.

Through Slobodchikoff's research, prairie dogs demonstrated productivity—the ability to construct new words for novel objects or animals—a trait previously thought exclusive to humans. His team has used computer technology to analyze prairie dog grammar, revealing how vocalizations combine into word-like structures and sentences.

Slobodchikoff advocates for preserving prairie dog habitats, particularly in New Mexico, where urban expansion threatens them. Although often viewed as pests for digging in parks, prairie dogs are keystone species essential to ecosystem survival. Amid destructive eradication methods like poisoning and bulldozing, fought by groups like Prairie Dog Pals, his research highlights their remarkable intelligence to drive conservation efforts.

=== Dogs ===
He also researches dogs' communication and writes a Dog Behavior Blog which gives some advice on how to solve behavior issues and has several short essays about some of the research about dogs and dog behavior. He has taken what he has learned from the findings of his research with prairie dogs to offer consultations about problems that pets may have with behavior and offer advice to correct those problems. He has also offered dog training classes based on what he has learned in his research.

== Published writings ==
Slobodchikoff has published papers in animal behavior, ecology, and evolution. Notable works include the 1981 co-authored paper with Thomas G. Whitham, "Evolution of individuals, plant-herbivore interactions, and mosaics of genetic variability: the adaptive significance of somatic mutations in plants" in Oecologia, and the 1991 paper, "Semantic information distinguishing individual predators in the alarm calls of Gunnison's prairie dogs" in Animal Behaviour. His books include Concepts of Species (1976), A New Ecology: Novel Approaches to Interactive Systems (1981), The Ecology of Social Behavior (1988), Prairie Dogs: Communication and Community in an Animal Society published by Harvard University Press (2009), and Learning the Language of Animals – Chasing Doctor Dolittle published by St. Martin's Press (2012).

== Media ==
Slobodchikoff has appeared on the BBC.
