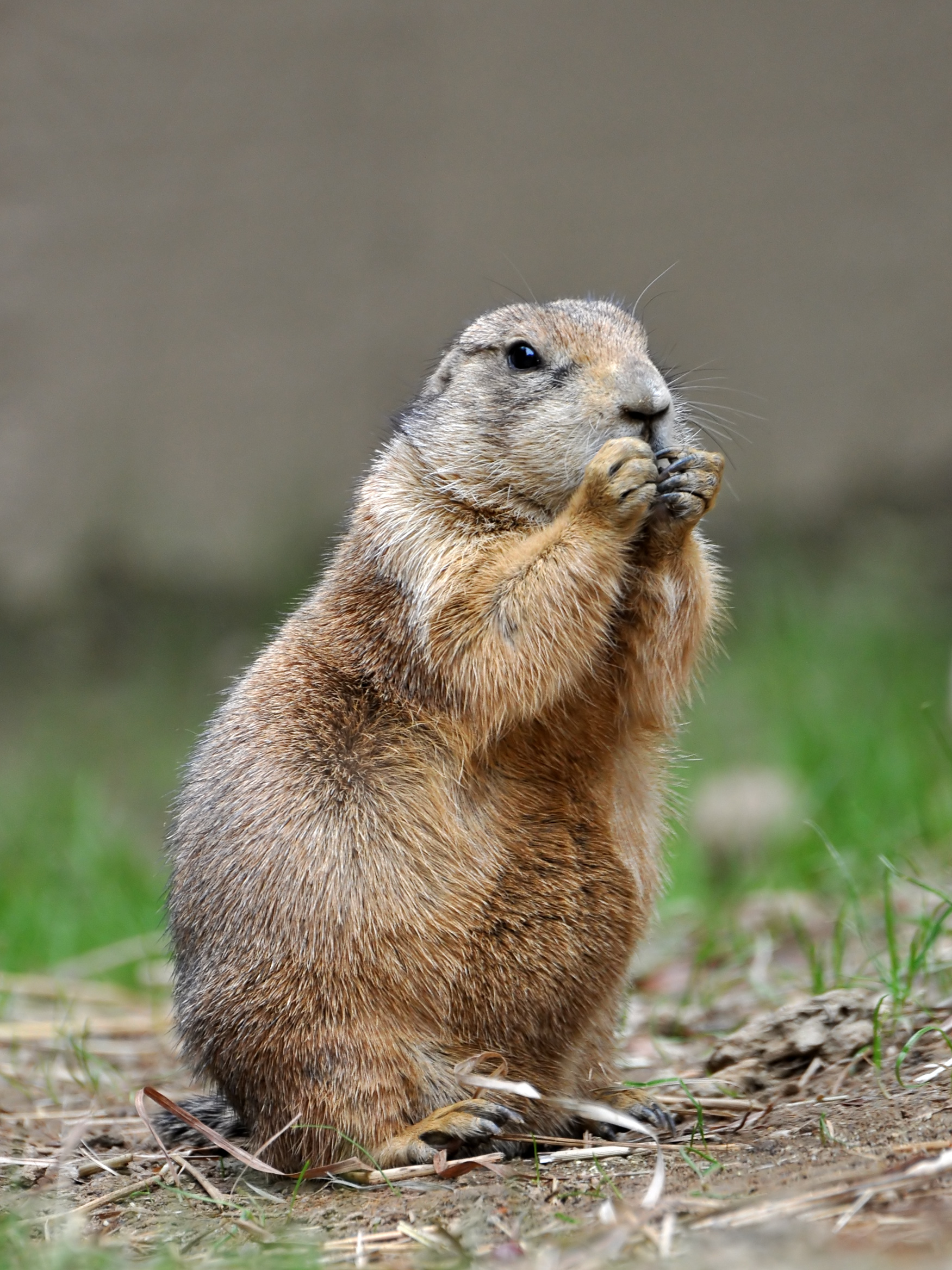
- Black-tailed prairie dog at the Smithsonian National Zoo Park in Washington, DC

Scientific classification
- Kingdom: Animalia
- Phylum: Chordata
- Class: Mammalia
- Order: Rodentia
- Family: Sciuridae
- Subfamily: Xerinae
- Tribe: Marmotini
- Genus: Cynomys; Rafinesque, 1817

Type species
- Cynomys socialis Rafinesque, 1817 (= Arctomys ludoviciana Ord, 1815)

Species
- Cynomys gunnisoni Cynomys leucurus Cynomys ludovicianus Cynomys mexicanus Cynomys parvidens
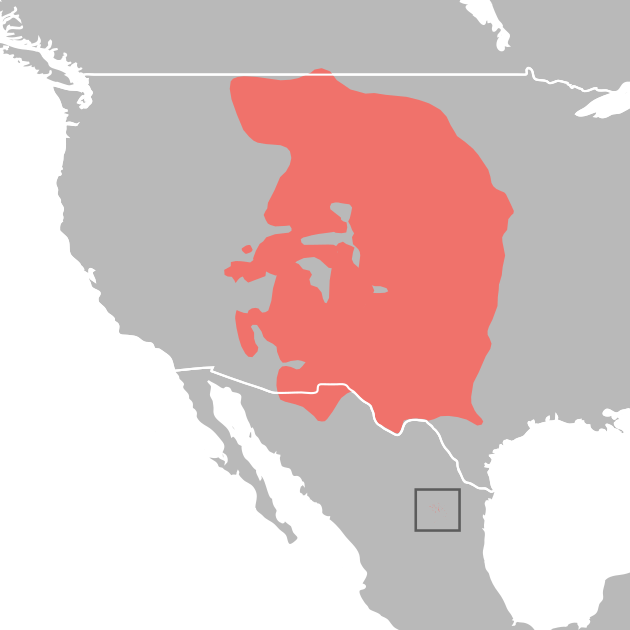
- Cynomys distribution

= Prairie dog =

Prairie dog Temporal range: Late Pliocene-Holocene (Note: Fossils of genus Cynomys have been dated to as far back as the late Blancan and as far back as the early Irvingtonian for both black- and white-tailed prairie dogs, but fossils of prairie dogs are scarce prior to the late Irvingtonian.)

Genus of ground squirrels

Prairie dogs (genus Cynomys) are herbivorous burrowing ground squirrels native to the grasslands of North America. There are five recognized species of prairie dog: black-tailed, white-tailed, Gunnison's, Utah, and Mexican prairie dogs. In Mexico, prairie dogs are found primarily in the northern states, which lie at the southern end of the Great Plains: northeastern Sonora, north and northeastern Chihuahua, northern Coahuila, northern Nuevo León, and northern Tamaulipas. In the United States, they range primarily to the west of the Mississippi River, though they have also been introduced in a few eastern locales. They are also found in the Canadian Prairies. Despite the name, they are not actually canines; prairie dogs, along with the marmots, chipmunks, and several other basal genera belong to the ground squirrels (tribe Marmotini), part of the larger squirrel family (Sciuridae).

Prairie dogs are considered a keystone species, with their mounds often being used by other species. Their mound-building encourages grass development and renewal of topsoil, with rich mineral and nutrient renewal in the soil, which can be crucial for soil quality and agriculture. They are extremely important in the food chain, being important to diets of many animals such as the black-footed ferret, swift fox, golden eagle, bald eagle, red tailed hawk, peregrine falcon, American badger, and coyote. Other species, such as the golden-mantled ground squirrel, mountain plover, and the burrowing owl, also rely on prairie dog burrows for nesting areas. Grazing species, such as plains bison, pronghorn, and mule deer, have shown a proclivity for grazing on the same land used by prairie dogs, with their regeneration of topsoil being important for maintaining healthy humus. Prairie dogs have some of the most complex systems of communication and social structures in the animal kingdom.

The prairie dog habitat has been affected by direct removal by farmers, and the more obvious encroachment of urban development, which has greatly reduced their populations. The removal of prairie dogs "causes undesirable spread of brush", the costs of which to livestock range and soil quality often outweighs the benefits of removal. Other threats include disease. The prairie dog is protected in many areas to maintain local populations and ensure natural ecosystems.

== Etymology ==
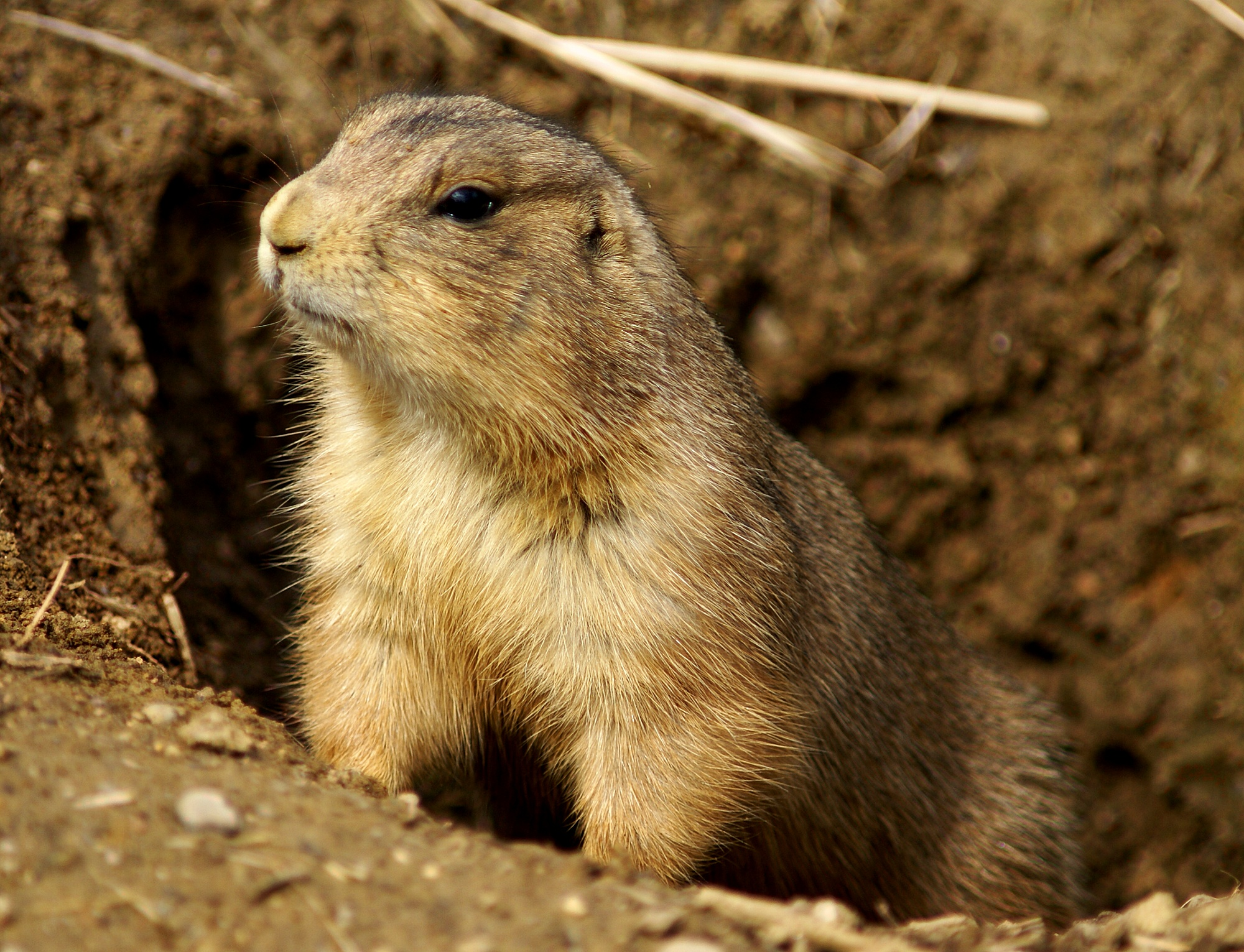
Prairie dogs raise their heads from their burrows in response to disturbances.

Prairie dogs are named for their habitat and warning call, which sounds similar to a dog's bark. The name was in use at least as early as 1774. The 1804 journals of the Lewis and Clark Expedition note that in September 1804, they "discovered a Village of an animal the French Call the Prairie Dog". Its genus, Cynomys, derives from the Greek for "dog mouse" (κυων kuōn, κυνος kunos – dog; μυς mus, μυός muos – mouse).

The prairie dog is known by several indigenous names. The name wishtonwish was recorded by Lt. Zebulon Pike while on the Arkansas two years after Lewis and Clark's expedition. In Lakota, the word is pispíza or pìspíza.

== Classification and first identification ==
The black-tailed prairie dog (Cynomys ludovicianus) was first described by Lewis and Clark in 1804. Lewis described it in more detail in 1806, calling it the "barking squirrel".

- Order Rodentia
- Suborder Sciuromorpha
  - Family Sciuridae (squirrels, chipmunks, marmots, and prairie dogs)
    - Subfamily Xerinae
      - Genus Cynomys
        - Gunnison's prairie dog, Cynomys gunnisoni
        - White-tailed prairie dog, Cynomys leucurus
        - Black-tailed prairie dog, Cynomys ludovicianus
        - Mexican prairie dog, Cynomys mexicanus
        - Utah prairie dog, Cynomys parvidens
      - About 14 other genera in subfamily

=== Extant species ===
Image	Common name	Scientific name	Distribution
	Gunnison's prairie dog	Cynomys gunnisoni	Utah, Colorado, Arizona, and New Mexico
	White-tailed prairie dog	Cynomys leucurus	Western Wyoming and western Colorado with small areas in eastern Utah and southern Montana.
	Black-tailed prairie dog	Cynomys ludovicianus	Saskatchewan, Montana, North Dakota, South Dakota, Wyoming, Colorado, Nebraska, Kansas, Oklahoma, Texas, Arizona, and New Mexico
	Mexican prairie dog	Cynomys mexicanus	Coahuila, Nuevo León, and San Luis Potosí
	Utah prairie dog	Cynomys parvidens	Utah

== Description ==
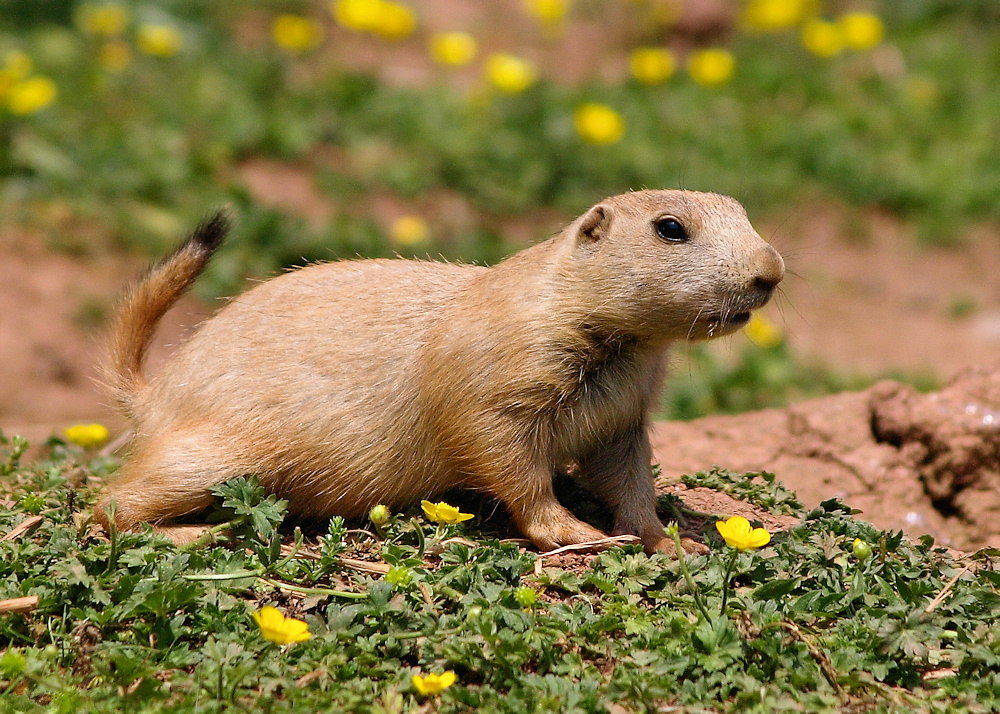
Full view of a prairie dog

Prairie dogs are stout-bodied rodents that, on average, are 30 to 40 cm (12 to 16 in) long, including the short tail, and weigh between 0.5 and 1.5 kilograms (1 and 3 lb). Sexual dimorphism in body mass in the prairie dog varies 105 to 136% between the sexes. Among the species, black-tailed prairie dogs tend to be the least sexually dimorphic, and white-tailed prairie dogs tend to be the most sexually dimorphic. Sexual dimorphism peaks during weaning, when the females lose weight and the males start eating more, and is at its lowest when the females are pregnant, which is also when the males are depleted from breeding.

Despite their name, a prairie dog skull has a condylobasal length of between 5.2 and 6.4 cm shorter than the skull of a canine or actual dog which is between 11.39 and 17.96 cm in length.

The average lifespan of a prairie dog in the wild is 8 to 10 years.

== Ecology and behavior ==
=== Diet ===
Prairie dogs are chiefly herbivorous, although they occasionally eat insects. They feed primarily on grasses and small seeds. In the fall, they eat broadleaf forbs. In the winter, lactating and pregnant females supplement their diets with snow for extra water. They also will eat roots, seeds, fruit, buds, and grasses of various species. Black-tailed prairie dogs in South Dakota eat western bluegrass, blue grama, buffalo grass, six weeks fescue, and tumblegrass, while Gunnison's prairie dogs eat rabbit brush, tumbleweeds, dandelions, saltbush, and cacti in addition to buffalo grass and blue grama. White-tailed prairie dogs have been observed to kill ground squirrels, a competing herbivore.

=== Habitat and burrowing ===
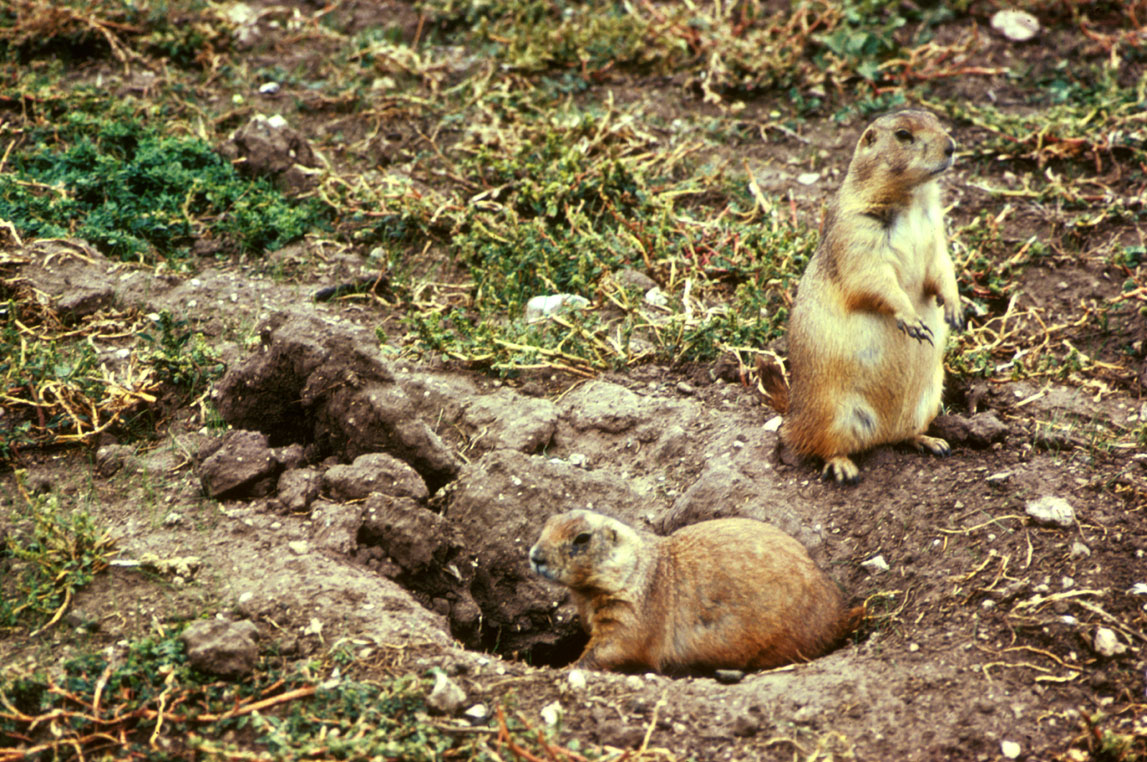
Prairie dogs at a burrow entrance

Prairie dogs live mainly at altitudes ranging from 2,000 to 10,000 ft (600 to 3,000 m) above sea level. The areas where they live can get as warm as 38 °C (100 °F) in the summer and as cold as −37 °C (−35 °F) in the winter. As prairie dogs live in areas prone to environmental threats, including hailstorms, blizzards, and floods, as well as drought and prairie fires, burrows provide important protection. Burrows help prairie dogs control their body temperature (thermoregulation) as they are 5–10 °C (41–50 °F) during the winter and 15–25 °C (59–77 °F) in the summer. Prairie dog tunnel systems channel rainwater into the water table, which prevents runoff and erosion, and can also change the composition of the soil in a region by reversing soil compaction that can result from cattle grazing.

Prairie dog burrows are 5–10 m (16–33 ft) long and 2–3 m (6.6–9.8 ft) below the ground. The entrance holes are generally 10–30 cm (3.9–11.8 in) in diameter. Prairie dog burrows can have up to six entrances. Sometimes, the entrances are simply flat holes in the ground. At other times, they are surrounded by mounds of soil either left as piles or hard-packed. Some mounds, known as dome craters, can be as high as 20–30 cm (7.9–11.8 in). Other mounds, known as rim craters, can be as high as 1 m (3 ft 3 in). Dome craters and rim craters serve as observation posts used by the animals to watch for predators. They also protect the burrows from flooding. The holes also possibly provide ventilation as the air enters through the dome crater and leaves through the rim crater, causing a breeze through the burrow. Prairie dog burrows contain chambers to provide certain functions. They have nursery chambers for their young, chambers for night, and chambers for the winter. They also contain air chambers that may function to protect the burrow from flooding and a listening post for predators. When hiding from predators, prairie dogs use less-deep chambers that are usually 1 m (3 ft 3 in) below the surface. Nursery chambers tend to be deeper, being 2 to 3 m (6 ft 7 in to 9 ft 10 in) below the surface.

=== Social organization and spacing ===
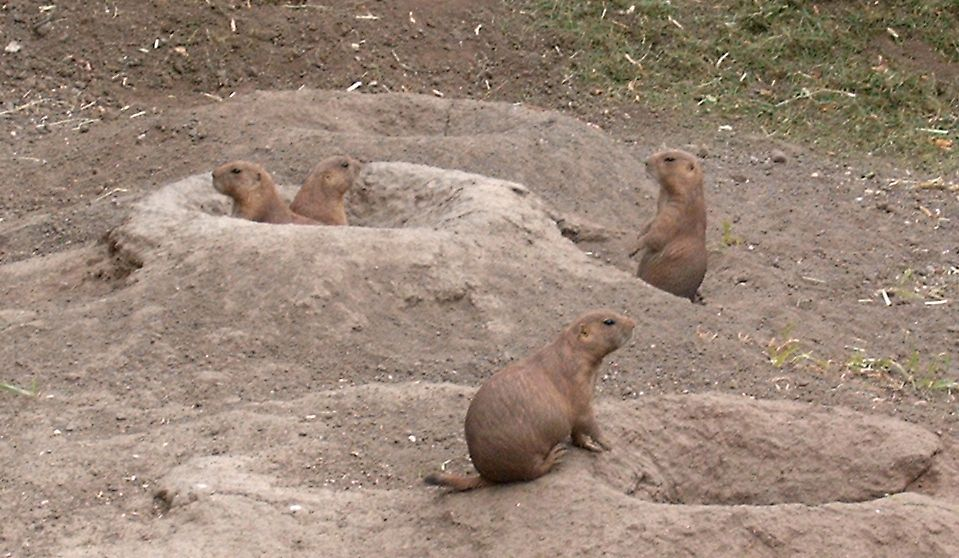
Prairie dog family

Prairie dogs are highly social animals. They live in large colonies or "towns", and collections of prairie dog families can span hundreds of acres. The prairie dog family groups are the most basic units of its society. Members of a family group inhabit the same territory. Family groups of black-tailed and Mexican prairie dogs are called "coteries", while "clans" describes family groups of white-tailed, Gunnison's, and Utah prairie dogs. Although these two family groups are similar, coteries tend to be more closely knit than clans. Members of a family group interact through oral contact or "kissing" and grooming one another. They do not perform these behaviors with prairie dogs from other family groups.

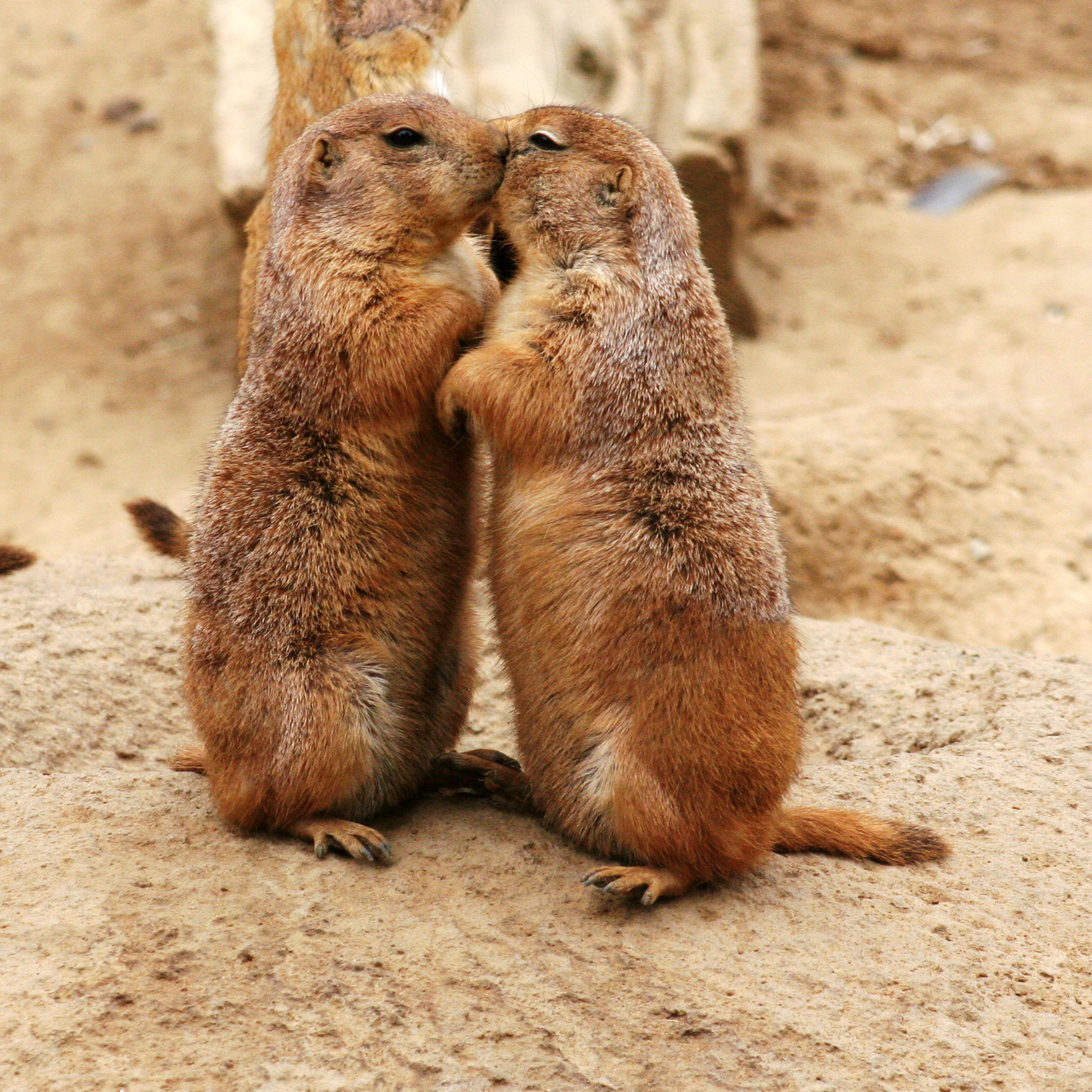
A pair of prairie dogs

A prairie dog town may contain 15–26 family groups, with subgroups within a town, called "wards", which are separated by a physical barrier. Family groups exist within these wards. Most prairie dog family groups are made up of one adult breeding male, two or three adult females, and one or two male offspring and one or two female offspring. Females remain in their natal groups for life, thus are the source of stability in the groups. However, it was observed some dispersed if there were no close family members alive. Males leave their natal groups when they mature to find another family group to defend and breed in. Some family groups contain more breeding females than one male can control, so have more than one breeding adult male in them. Among these multiple-male groups, some may contain males that have friendly relationships, but the majority contain males that have largely antagonistic relationships. In the former, the males tend to be related, while in the latter, they tend not to be related. Two or three groups of females may be controlled by one male. However, among these female groups, no friendly relationships exist.

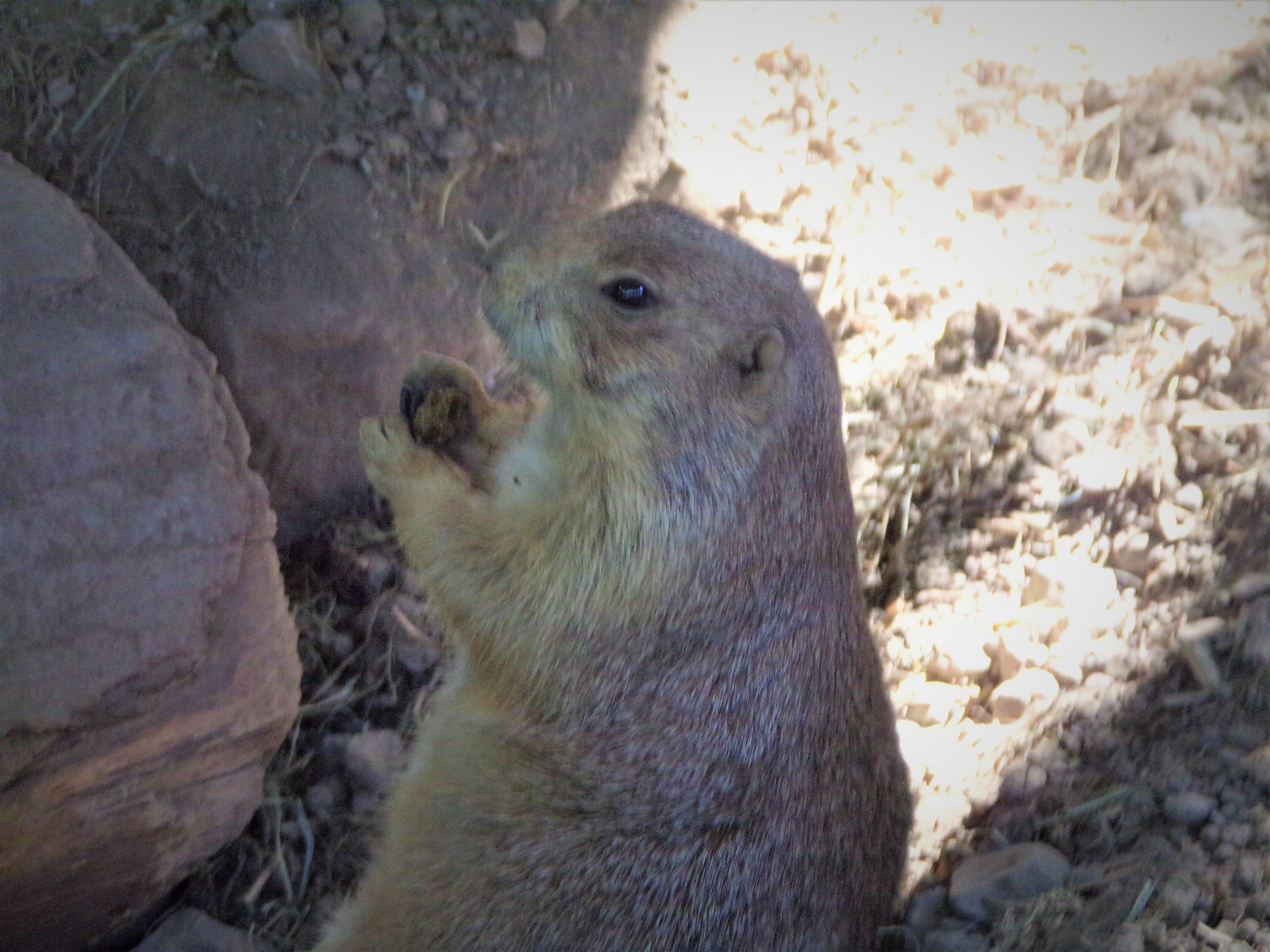
A prairie dog at a zoo.

The typical prairie dog territory takes up 0.05–1.01 hectares (0.12–2.50 acres). Territories have well-established borders that coincide with physical barriers such as rocks and trees. The resident male of a territory defends it, and antagonistic behavior occurs between two males of different families to defend their territories. These interactions may happen 20 times per day and last five minutes. When two prairie dogs encounter each other at the edges of their territories, they stare, make bluff charges, flare their tails, chatter their teeth, and sniff each other's perianal scent glands. When fighting, prairie dogs bite, kick, and ram each other. If their competitor is around their size or smaller, the females participate in fighting. Otherwise, if a competitor is sighted, the females signal for the resident male.

=== Reproduction and parenting ===
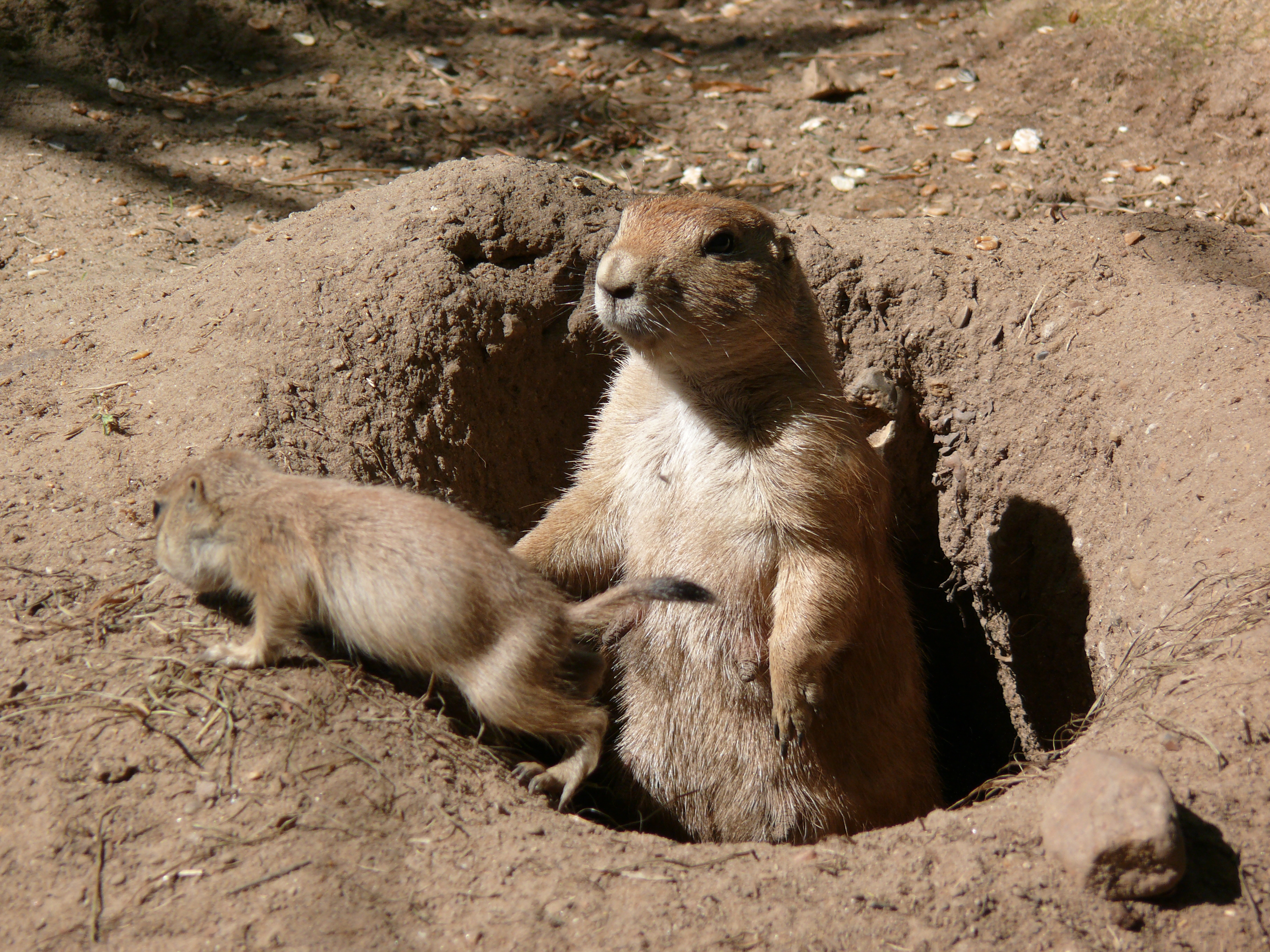
Female with juvenile

Prairie dog copulation occurs in the burrows, which reduces the risk of interruption by a competing male. They are also at less risk of predation. Behaviors that signal that a female is in estrus include underground consorting, self-licking of genitals, dust-bathing, and late entrances into the burrow at night. The licking of genitals may protect against sexually transmitted diseases and genital infections, while dust-bathing may protect against fleas and other parasites. Prairie dogs also have a mating call which consists of up to 25 barks with a 3- to 15-second pause between each one. Females may try to increase their reproduction success by mating with males outside their family groups. When copulation is over, the male is no longer interested in the female sexually, but will prevent other males from mating with her by inserting copulatory plugs.

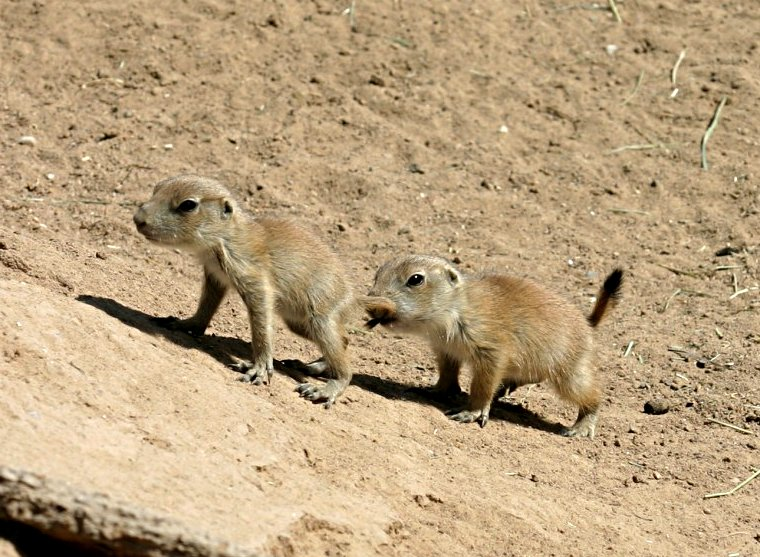
Juvenile prairie dogs

For black-tailed prairie dogs, the resident male of the family group fathers all the offspring. Multiple paternity in litters seems to be more common in Utah and Gunnison's prairie dogs. Mother prairie dogs do most of the care for the young. In addition to nursing the young, the mother also defends the nursery chamber and collects grass for the nest. Males play their part by defending the territories and maintaining the burrows. The young spend their first six weeks below the ground being nursed. They are then weaned and begin to surface from the burrow. By five months, they are fully grown. The subject of cooperative breeding in prairie dogs has been debated among biologists. Some argue prairie dogs will defend and feed young that are not theirs, and young seemingly sleep in a nursery chamber with other mothers; since most nursing occurs at night, this may be a case of communal nursing. In the case of the latter, others suggest communal nursing occurs only when mothers mistake another female's young for their own. Infanticide is known to occur in prairie dogs. Males that take over a family group will kill the offspring of the previous male. This causes the mother to go into estrus sooner. However, most infanticide is done by close relatives. Lactating females will kill the offspring of a related female both to decrease competition for the female's offspring and for increased foraging area due to a decrease in territorial defense by the victimized mother. Supporters of the theory that prairie dogs are communal breeders state that another reason for this type of infanticide is so that the female can get a possible helper. With their own offspring gone, the victimized mother may help raise the young of other females.

=== Predator alarm calls ===
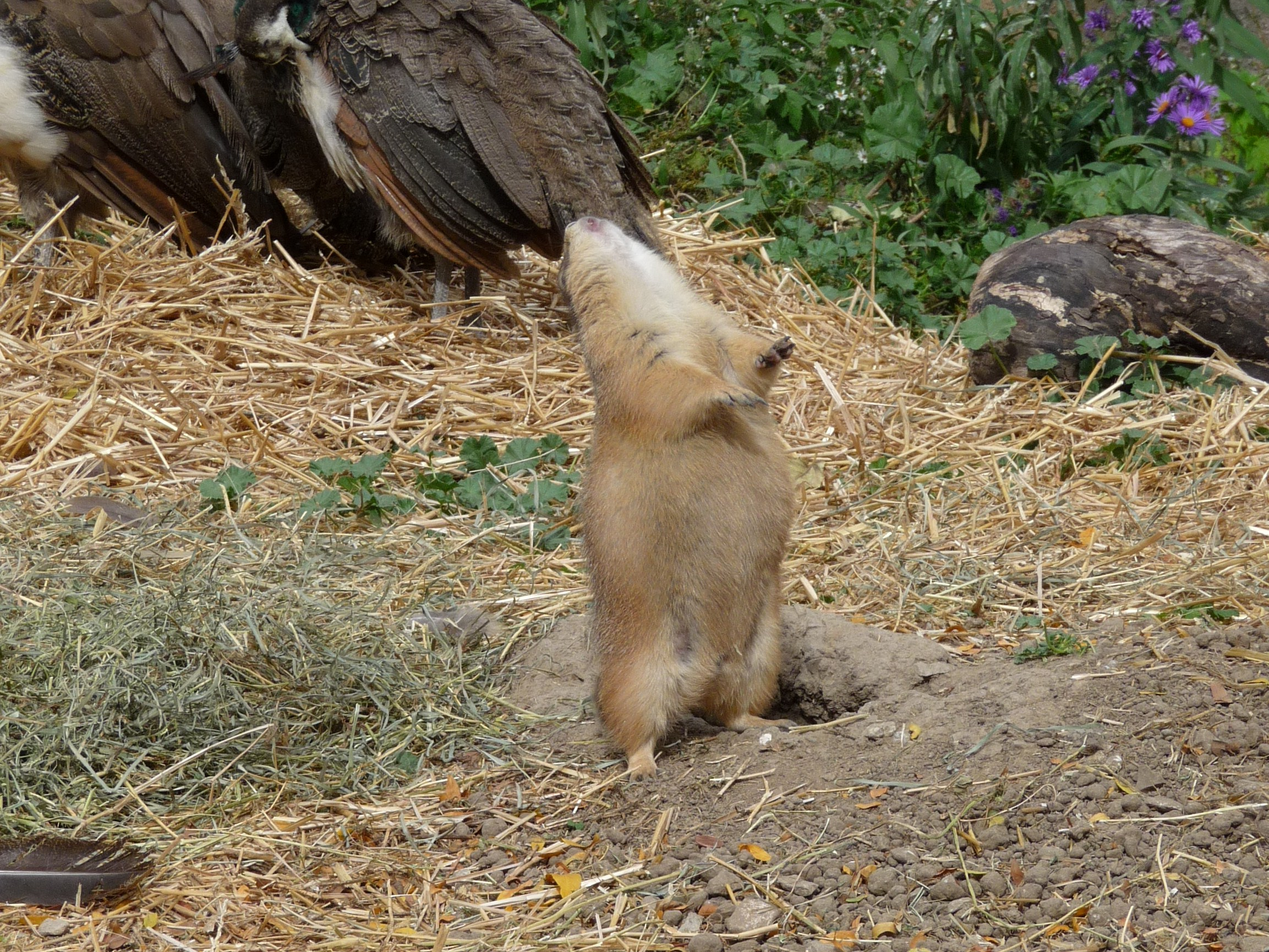
Prairie dog calling

The prairie dog is well adapted to predation. Using its dichromatic color vision, it can detect predators from a great distance; it then alerts other prairie dogs of the danger with a special, high-pitched call. Con Slobodchikoff and others assert that prairie dogs use a sophisticated system of vocal communication to describe specific predators. According to him, prairie dog calls contain specific information as to what the predator is, how big it is, what color it is and how fast it is approaching. These have been described as a form of grammar. According to Slobodchikoff, these calls, with their individuality in response to a specific predator, imply that prairie dogs have highly developed cognitive abilities. He also writes that prairie dogs have calls for things that are not predators to them. This is cited as evidence that the animals have a very descriptive language and have calls for any potential threat.

The prairie dog's alarm calls vary with different predators. For example, there are three distinct mid-pitched sounds for birds including red-tailed hawks, golden eagles and bald eagles, and four high-pitched quick sounds for mammals like coyotes, dogs, humans etc.

Alarm response behavior varies according to the type of predator announced. If the alarm indicates a hawk diving toward the colony, all the prairie dogs in its flight path dive into their holes, while those outside the flight path stand and watch. If the alarm is for a human, all members of the colony immediately rush inside the burrows. For coyotes, the prairie dogs move to the entrance of a burrow and stand outside the entrance, observing the coyote, while those prairie dogs that were inside the burrows come out to stand and watch, as well. For domestic dogs, the response is to observe, standing in place where they were when the alarm was sounded, again with the underground prairie dogs emerging to watch.

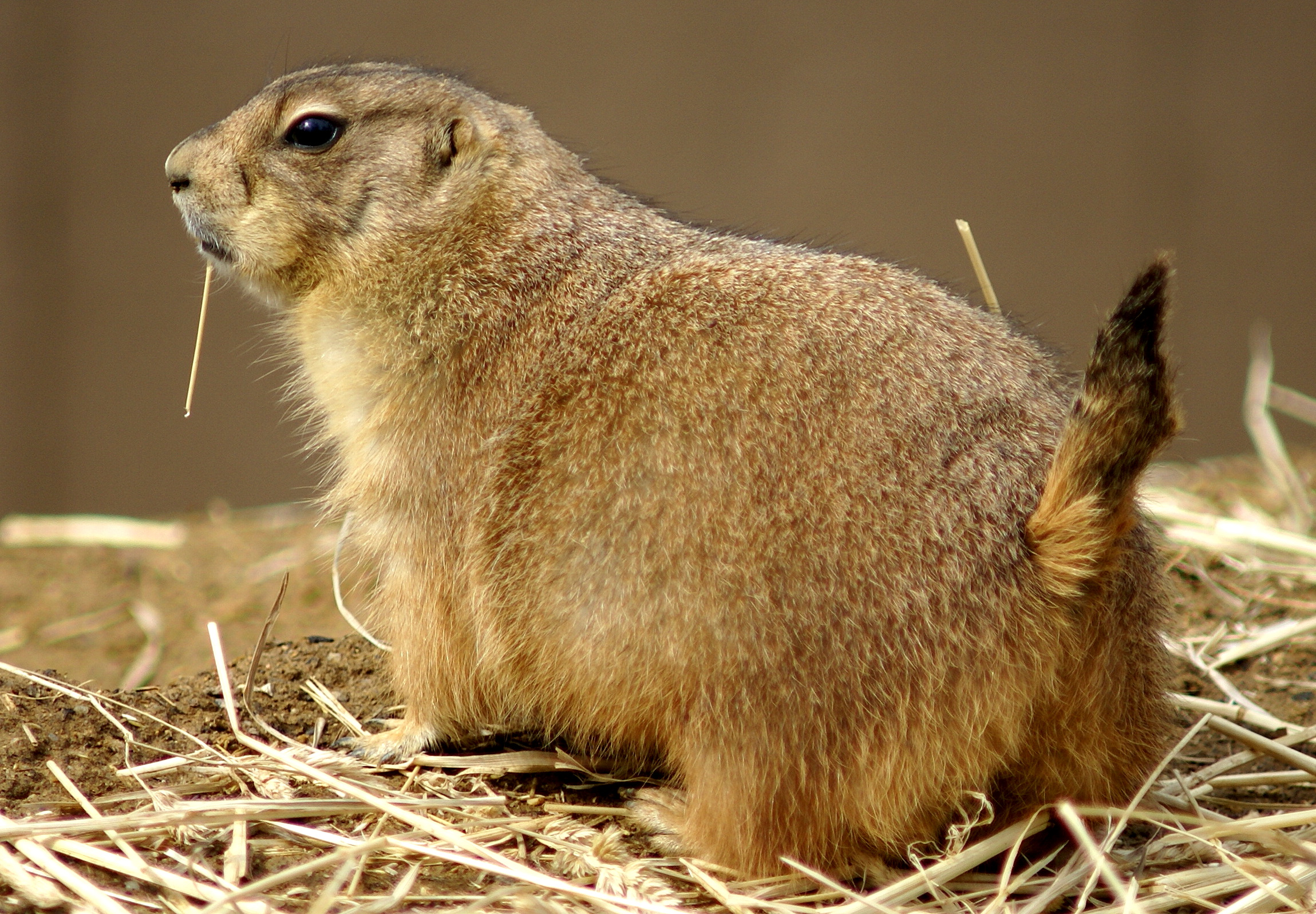
Black-tailed prairie dog forages above ground for grasses and leaves.

Studies of black-tailed prairie dogs suggest that alarm-calling is a form of kin selection, as a prairie dog's call alerts both offspring and indirectly related kin, such as cousins, nephews, and nieces. Prairie dogs with kin close by called more often than those that did not have kin nearby. In addition, the caller may be trying to make itself more noticeable to the predator. Predators, though, seem to have difficulty determining which prairie dog is making the call due to its "ventriloquistic" nature.

Perhaps the most striking of prairie dog communications is the territorial call or "jump-yip" display of the black-tailed prairie dog. A black-tailed prairie dog stretches the length of its body vertically and throws its forefeet into the air while making a call. A jump-yip from one prairie dog causes others nearby to do the same.

== Conservation status ==
A prairie dog and its hole

Ecologists consider the prairie dog to be a keystone species. They are an important prey species, being the primary diet in prairie species such as the black-footed ferret, swift fox, golden eagle, red tailed hawk, American badger, coyote, and ferruginous hawk. Other species, such as the golden-mantled ground squirrel, mountain plover, and the burrowing owl, also rely on prairie dog burrows for nesting areas. Even grazing species, such as plains bison, pronghorn, and mule deer have shown a proclivity for grazing on the same land used by prairie dogs.

Nevertheless, prairie dogs are often identified as pests and exterminated from agricultural properties because they are capable of damaging crops, as they clear the immediate area around their burrows of most vegetation.

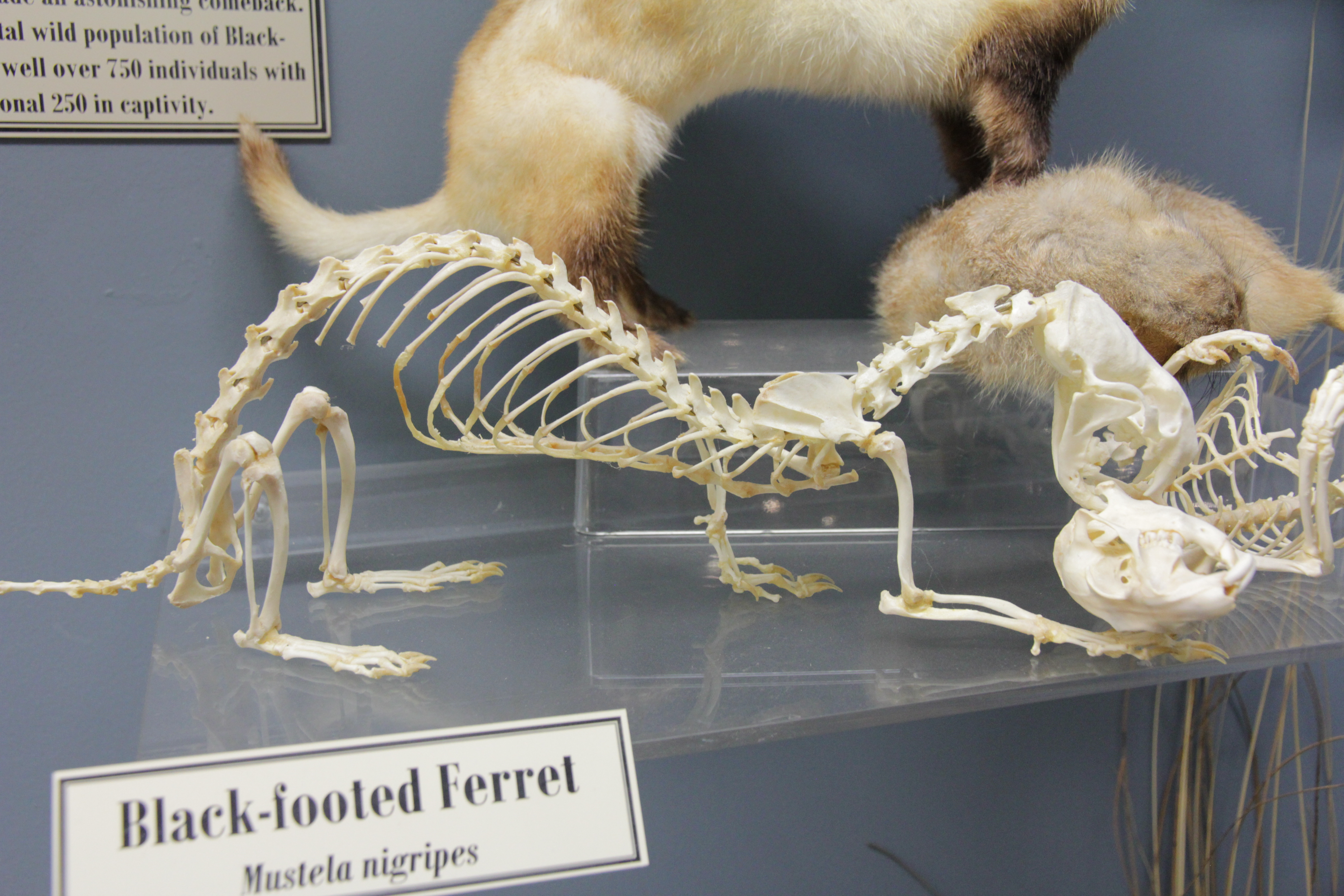
Skeleton of a black-footed ferret (Mustela nigripes) with a prairie dog skeleton, articulated to show the predator-prey relationship between them. (Museum of Osteology)

As a result, prairie dog habitat has been affected by direct removal by farmers, as well as the more obvious encroachment of urban development, which has greatly reduced their populations. The removal of prairie dogs "causes undesirable spread of brush", the costs of which to livestock range may outweigh the benefits of removal. Black-tailed prairie dogs comprise the largest remaining community. In spite of human encroachment, prairie dogs have adapted, continuing to dig burrows in open areas of western cities.

One common concern, which led to the widespread extermination of prairie dog colonies, was that their digging activities could injure horses by fracturing their limbs. According to writer Fred Durso Jr., of E Magazine, though, "after years of asking ranchers this question, we have found not one example." Another concern is their susceptibility to Bubonic plague. As of July 2016 the U.S. Fish and Wildlife Service plans to distribute an oral vaccine it had developed by unmanned aircraft or drones.

== In captivity ==
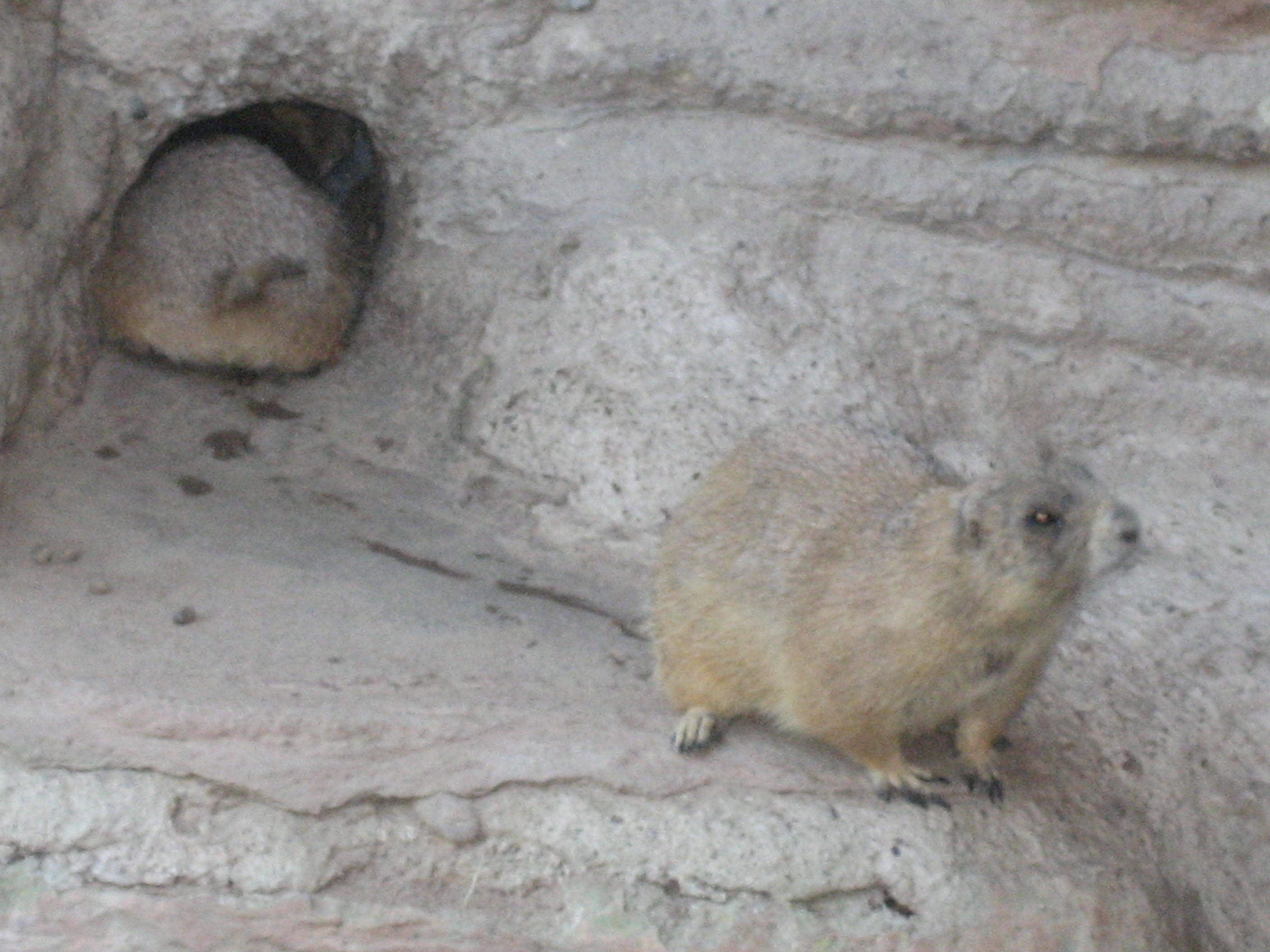
Prairie dogs are gaining popularity as zoo animals.

South-central Wisconsin, U.S.

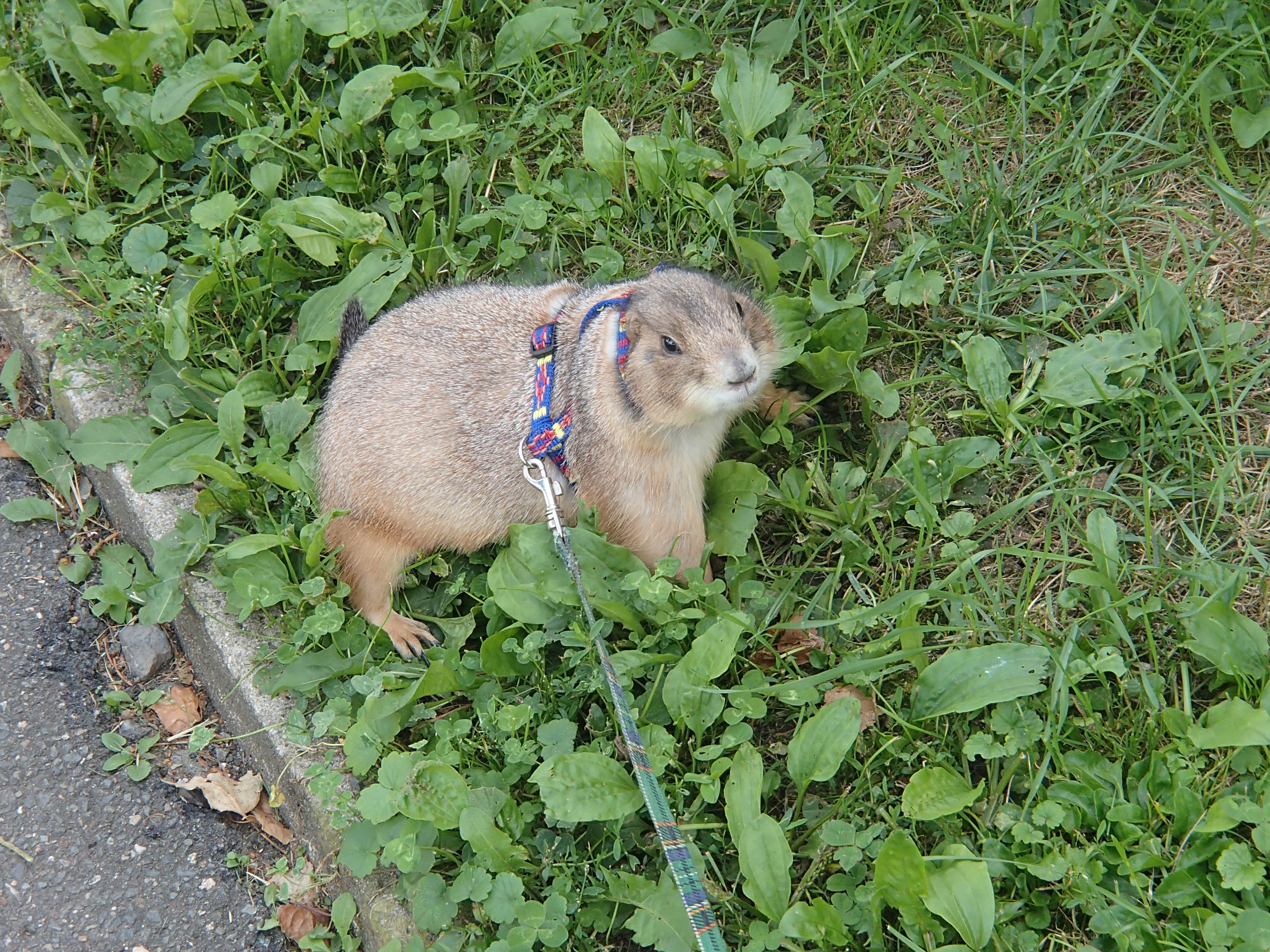
Pet prairie dogs can be leash trained

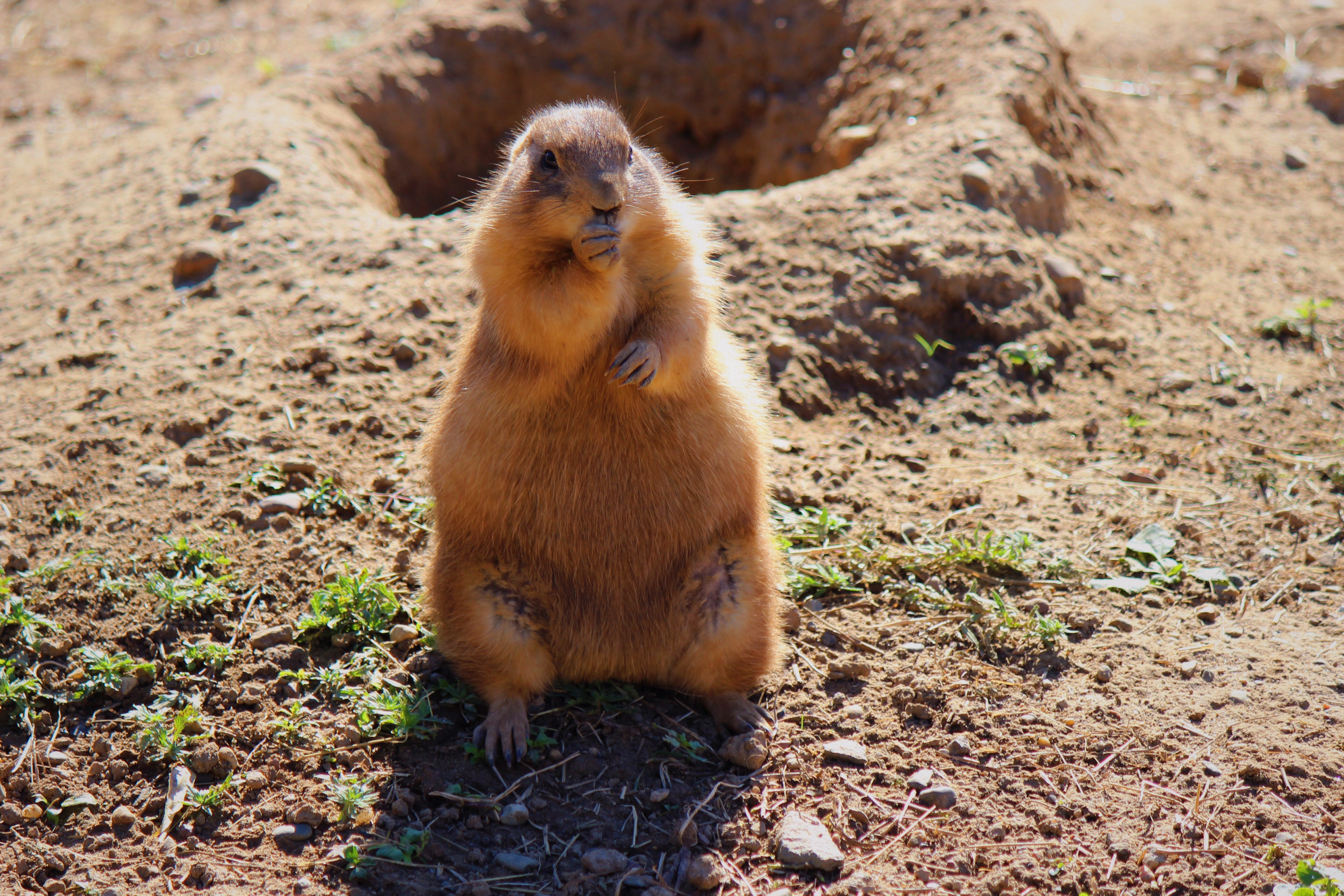
Prairie dog at the Minnesota Zoo

Until 2003, primarily black-tailed prairie dogs were collected from the wild for the exotic pet trade in Canada, the United States, Japan, and Europe. They were removed from their burrows each spring, as young pups, with a large vacuum device. They can be difficult to breed in captivity, but breed well in zoos. Removing them from the wild was a far more common method of supplying the market demand.

They can be difficult pets to care for, requiring regular attention and a very specific diet of grasses and hay. Each year, they go into a period called rut that can last for several months, in which their personalities can drastically change, often becoming defensive or even aggressive. Despite their needs, prairie dogs are very social animals and come to seem as though they treat humans as members of their colony.

In mid-2003, due to cross-contamination at a Madison, Wisconsin-area pet swap from an unquarantined Gambian pouched rat imported from Ghana, several prairie dogs in captivity acquired monkeypox, and subsequently a few humans were also infected. This led the Centers for Disease Control and Prevention (CDC) and Food and Drug Administration (FDA) to issue a joint order banning the sale, trade, and transport within the United States of prairie dogs (with a few exceptions). The disease was never introduced to any wild populations. The European Union also banned importation of prairie dogs in response.

All Cynomys species are classed as a "prohibited new organism" under New Zealand's Hazardous Substances and New Organisms Act 1996, preventing them from being imported into the country.

Prairie dogs are also very susceptible to bubonic plague, and many wild colonies have been wiped out by it. Also, in 2002, a large group of prairie dogs in captivity in Texas were found to have contracted tularemia. The prairie dog ban is frequently cited by the CDC as a successful response to the threat of zoonosis.

Prairie dogs that were in captivity at the time of the ban in 2003 were allowed to be kept under a grandfather clause, but were not to be bought, traded, or sold, and transport was permitted only to and from a veterinarian under quarantine procedures.

On 8 September 2008, the FDA and CDC rescinded the ban, making it once again legal to capture, sell, and transport prairie dogs. Although the federal ban has been lifted, several states still have in place their own ban on prairie dogs.

The European Union has not lifted its ban on imports from the U.S. of animals captured in the wild. Major European Prairie Dog Associations, such as the Italian Associazione Italiana Cani della Prateria, remain opposed to imports from the United States, due to the high death rate of wild captures. Several zoos in Europe have stable prairie dog colonies that generate enough surplus pups to saturate the EU internal demand, and several associations help owners to give adoption to captive-born animals.

Prairie dogs in captivity may live up to 10 years.

== Literary descriptions ==
- From George Wilkins Kendall's account of the Texan Santa Fe Expedition: "In their habits, they are clannish, social, and extremely convivial, never living alone like other animals, but on the contrary, always found in villages or large settlements. They are a wild, frolicsome, madcap set of fellows when undisturbed, uneasy and ever on the move, and appear to take especial delight in chattering away the time, and visiting from hole to hole to gossip and talk over each other's affairs—at least so their actions would indicate. On several occasions I crept close to their villages, without being observed, to watch their movements. Directly in the centre of one of them I particularly noticed a very large dog, sitting in front of the door or entrance to his burrow, and by his own actions and those of his neighbors it really seemed as though he was the president, mayor, or chief—at all events, he was the 'big dog' of the place. For at least an hour I secretly watched the operations in this community. During that time the large dog I have mentioned received at least a dozen visits from his fellow-dogs, which would stop and chat with him a few moments, and then run off to their domiciles. All this while he never left his post for a moment, and I thought I could discover a gravity in his deportment not discernible in those by which he was surrounded. Far is it from me to say that the visits he received were upon business, or had anything to do with the local government of the village; but it certainly appeared so. If any animal has a system of laws regulating the body politic, it is certainly the prairie dog."

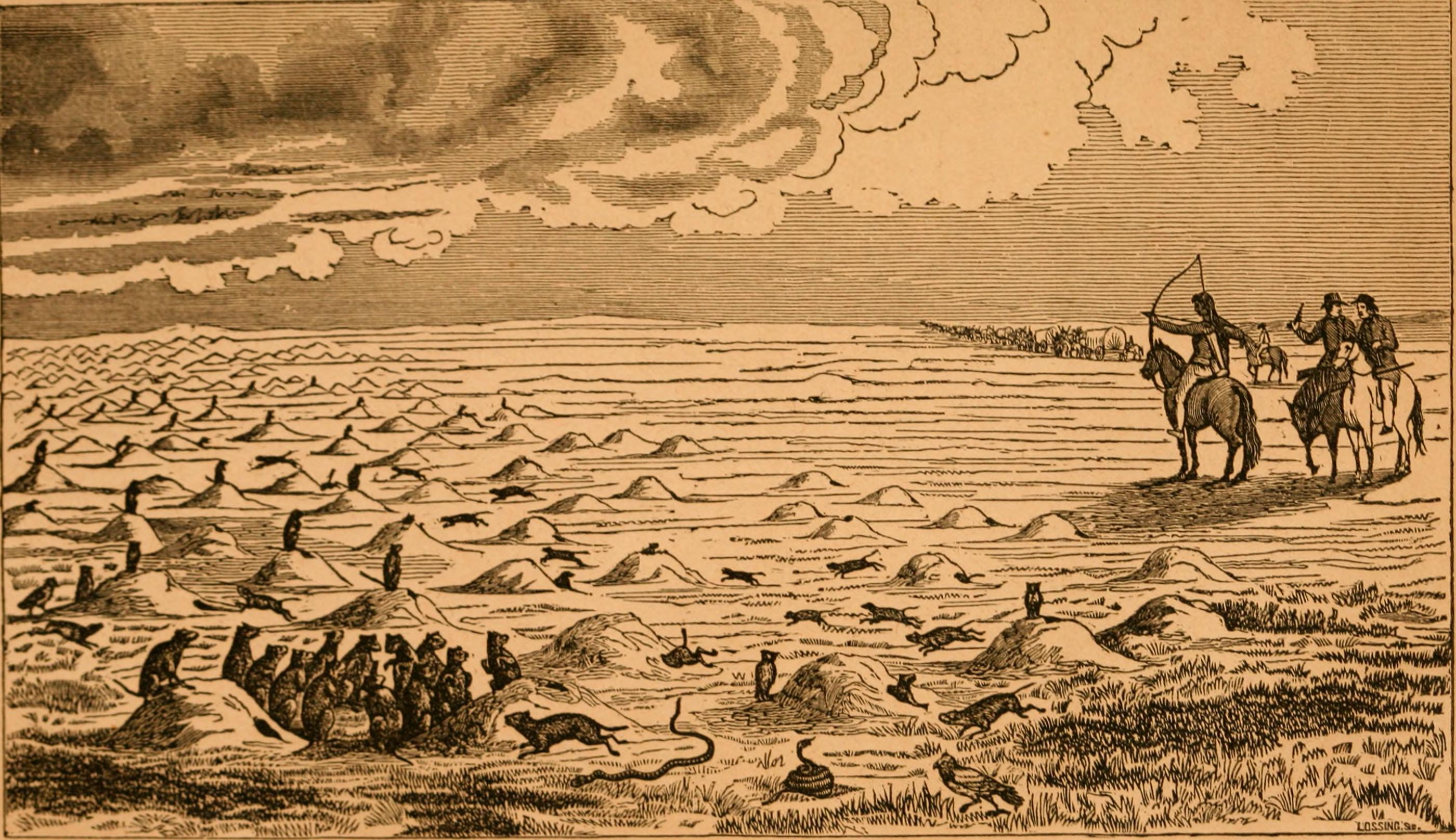
"Dog Town" or settlement of prairie dogs, from Commerce of the Prairies

- From Josiah Gregg's journal, Commerce of the Prairies: "Of all the prairie animals, by far the most curious, and by no means the least celebrated, is the little prairie dog. ...The flesh, though often eaten by travelers, is not esteemed savory. It was denominated the 'barking squirrel', the 'prairie ground-squirrel', etc., by early explorers, with much more apparent propriety than the present established name. Its yelp, which resembles that of the little toy-dog, seems its only canine attribute. It rather appears to occupy a middle ground betwixt the rabbit and squirrel—like the former in feeding and burrowing—like the latter in frisking, flirting, sitting erect, and somewhat so in its barking. The prairie dog has been reckoned by some naturalists a species of the marmot (Arctomys ludoviciana); yet it seems to possess scarce any other quality in common with this animal except that of burrowing. ...I have the concurrent testimony of several persons, who have been upon the Prairies in winter, that, like rabbits and squirrels, they issue from their holes every soft day; and therefore lay up no doubt a hoard of 'hay' (as there is rarely anything else to be found in the vicinity of their towns) for winter's use. A collection of their burrows has been termed by travelers a 'dog town,' which comprises from a dozen or so, to some thousands in the same vicinity; often covering an area of several square miles. They generally locate upon firm dry plains, coated with fine short grass, upon which they feed; for they are no doubt exclusively herbivorous. But even when tall coarse grass surrounds, they seem commonly to destroy this within their 'streets,' which are nearly always found 'paved' with a fine species suited to their palates. They must need but little water, if any at all, as their 'towns' are often, indeed generally, found in the midst of the most arid plains—unless we suppose they dig down to subterranean fountains. At least they evidently burrow remarkably deep. Attempts either to dig or drown them out of their holes have generally proved unsuccessful. Approaching a 'village,' the little dogs may be observed frisking about the 'streets'—passing from dwelling to dwelling apparently on visits—sometimes a few clustered together as though in council—here feeding upon the tender herbage—there cleansing their 'houses,' or brushing the little hillock about the door—yet all quiet. Upon seeing a stranger, however, each streaks it to its home, but is apt to stop at the entrance, and spread the general alarm by a succession of shrill yelps, usually sitting erect. Yet at the report of a gun or the too near approach of the visitor, they dart down and are seen no more till the cause of alarm seems to have disappeared.

== In culture ==
In companies that use large numbers of cubicles in a common space, employees sometimes use the term "prairie dogging" to refer to the action of several people simultaneously looking over the walls of their cubicles in response to a noise or other distraction. This action is thought to resemble the startled response of a group of prairie dogs.

The same term, also called turtle heading, is also vulgar slang to refer to one who is on the verge of defecating (often involuntarily), with the implication that fecal matter has already begun partially exiting the anus.

The Amarillo Sod Poodles, a minor league baseball team, use a nickname for prairie dogs as their cognomen.

== See also ==
- Communal burrow
