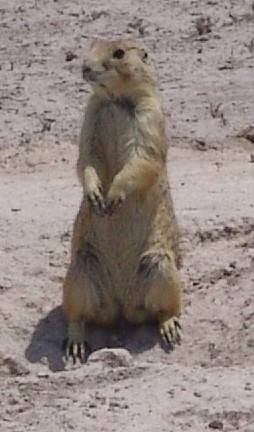
- Galeana, Nuevo León, Mexico

Conservation status
- Endangered (IUCN 3.1)
- CITES Appendix II

Scientific classification
- Kingdom: Animalia
- Phylum: Chordata
- Class: Mammalia
- Order: Rodentia
- Family: Sciuridae
- Genus: Cynomys
- Species: C. mexicanus

Binomial name
- Cynomys mexicanus Merriam, 1892
- Regions in northern Mexico where Cynomys mexicanus is found.

= Mexican prairie dog =

Species of rodent

The Mexican prairie dog (Cynomys mexicanus) is a diurnal burrowing rodent native to north-central Mexico. It is classified as a keystone species due to its large impact on other species and the environment. Treatment as an agricultural pest has led to its status as an endangered species. They are closely related to squirrels, chipmunks, and marmots. Cynomys mexicanus originated about 230,000 years ago from a peripherally isolated population of the more widespread Cynomys ludovicianus.

== Ecology ==
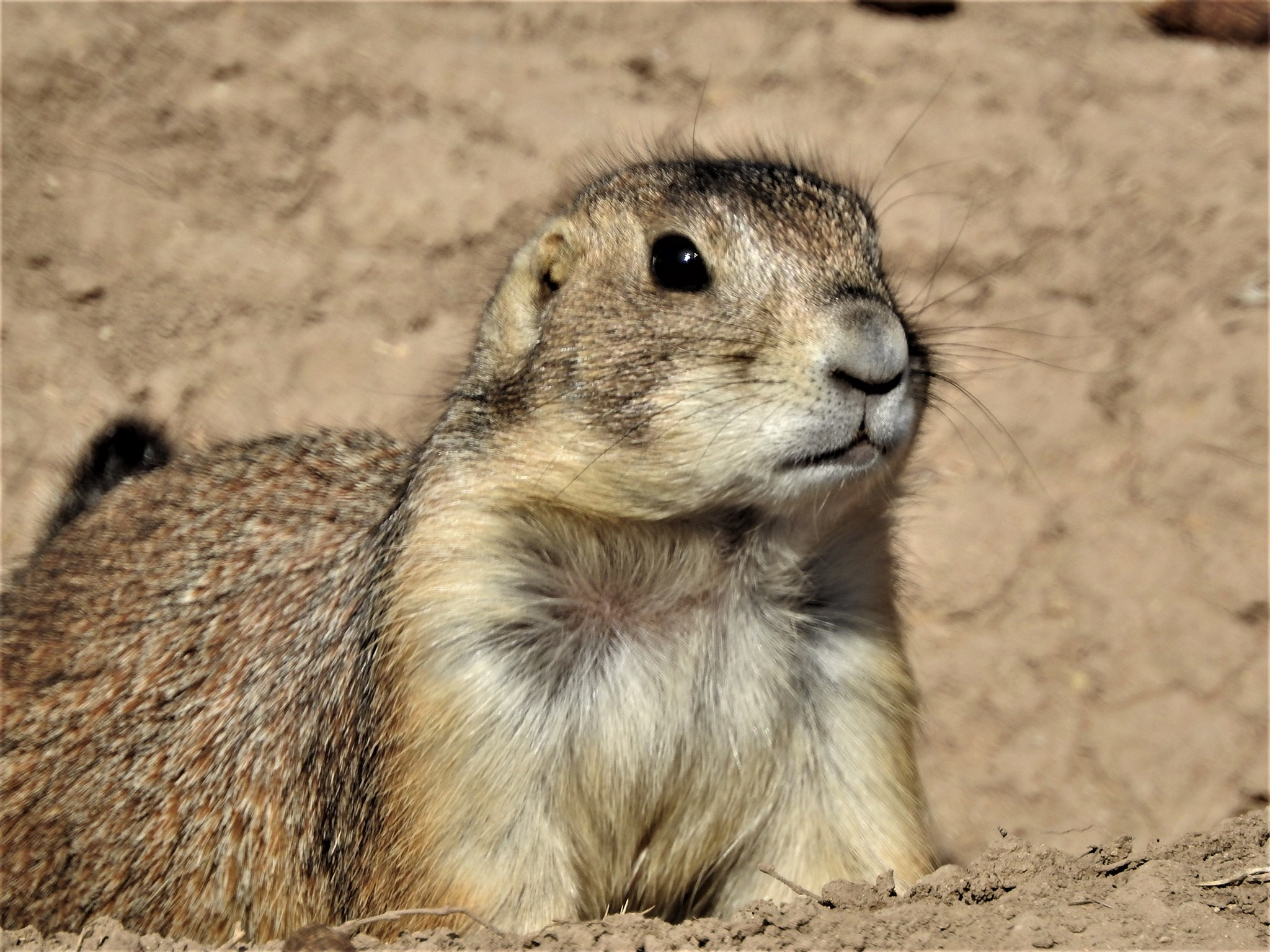
Mexican prairie dog (Cynomys mexicanus)

Mexican prairie dogs acquire all of their water from plants. Although they are mainly herbivores, they have been known to eat insects. Predators include cougars, bobcats, gray foxes, golden eagles, hawks (such as peregrine falcons, prairie falcons and northern goshawks), and a variety of rattlesnakes (such as western diamondback rattlesnakes, green rattlesnakes, black-tailed rattlesnakes, Tamaulipan rock rattlesnakes, twin-spotted rattlesnakes, Mojave rattlesnakes, and Totonacan rattlesnakes).

Mexican prairie dogs live in excavated colonies, referred to as "towns", which they dig for shelter and protection. A typical town has a funnel-like entrance that slants down into a corridor up to 100 ft (30 m) long, with side chambers for storage and nesting. It has been found that some chambers in these burrows serve specific purposes such as nurseries for new mothers and their young. Prairie dogs have strong muscles in their arms which allow them to dig through the often dense dirt of their habitats. They have even been found to use their teeth to dig, although this is less common. Towns can contain hundreds of animals, but generally have fewer than 50, with a single alpha male.

Mexican prairie dogs hibernate and have a shorter mating season, which generally lasts from January to April. After one month's gestation, females give birth to one litter per year, with an average of four hairless pups. They are born with their eyes closed and use their tails as visual aids until they can see, about 40 days after birth. Weaning occurs during late May and early June, when yearlings may break away from the burrow. Pups leave their mothers by the fall.

As they grow older, young play fighting games that involve biting, hissing, and tackling. They reach sexual maturity after one year, with a lifespan of 3–5 years; adults weigh about 1 kg (2.2 lb) and are 14–17 inches (360–430 mm) long, and males are larger than females. Their coloring is tan, with darker ears and a lighter belly. Mexican prairie dogs also have a black coloring on the end of their tails.

Prairie dogs have one of the most sophisticated languages in the animal world—a system of high-pitched yips and barks. In fact, their noises is how they got their name, due to the resemblance to dog barks. They can run up to 35 mph (56 km/h). As a consequence, their defense mechanism is to sound the alarm, and get away quickly.

== Habitat ==
These prairie dogs prefer to inhabit rock-free soil in plains at an altitude of 1,600–2,200 m (5,200–7,200 ft). They are found in the regions of southern Coahuila and northern San Luis Potosí in northern Mexico, where they eat herbs and grasses native to the plains where they live.

== Keystone species ==
Due to their impact on other animals and the environment, Mexican prairie dogs are identified as a keystone species and create a bottom-up trophic cascade. Their burrows, while they serve as a shelter for their species, serve as a shelter to other species, as well, such as rattlesnakes and burrowing owls. Mexican prairie dogs also graze the prairie's grasslands, increasing the nutrition of the grasses for other animals.

== Population and distribution ==
In 1956, the Mexican prairie dog was reported as occurring in Coahuila, Nuevo León, and San Luis Potosí. By the 1980s, it had disappeared from Nuevo León. As of 1992 its complete range was roughly 600 km^{2} (230 mi^{2}). Viewed as a pest and an obstacle to agriculture and cattle raising due to their burrowing and frequent consumption of crops, Mexican prairie dogs were frequently poisoned, and became endangered in 1994. Mexican prairie dogs currently inhabit less than 4% of their former territory and have suffered a 33% decrease in range between 1996 and 1999.

The current habitat of Mexican prairie dogs is in the region known as El Tokio. These are the grasslands located in the convergence of the states of San Luis Potosí, Nuevo León, and Coahuila. Due to the underground structures in which many prairie dogs live, it is difficult to accurately survey populations. The use of satellite imagery has proven to be helpful in documenting areas in which prairie dogs reside.

== Conservation efforts ==
The Mexican prairie dog is considered endangered and is continuously decreasing in population. Due to this, various conservation efforts have been put into effect.

For instance, Defenders of Wildlife moves prairie dogs from habitats of threat to safe, protected habitats. This protects them from being treated as pests who would have been poisoned or killed.

Along with this, Espacios Naturales y Desarrollo Sustentable has a "Mexican Prairie Dog Recovery Program" in which the species is reintroduced to areas where they no longer inhabited. Between 2014 and 2025, the species has been reintroduced to five habitats in Zacatecas, Mexico.
