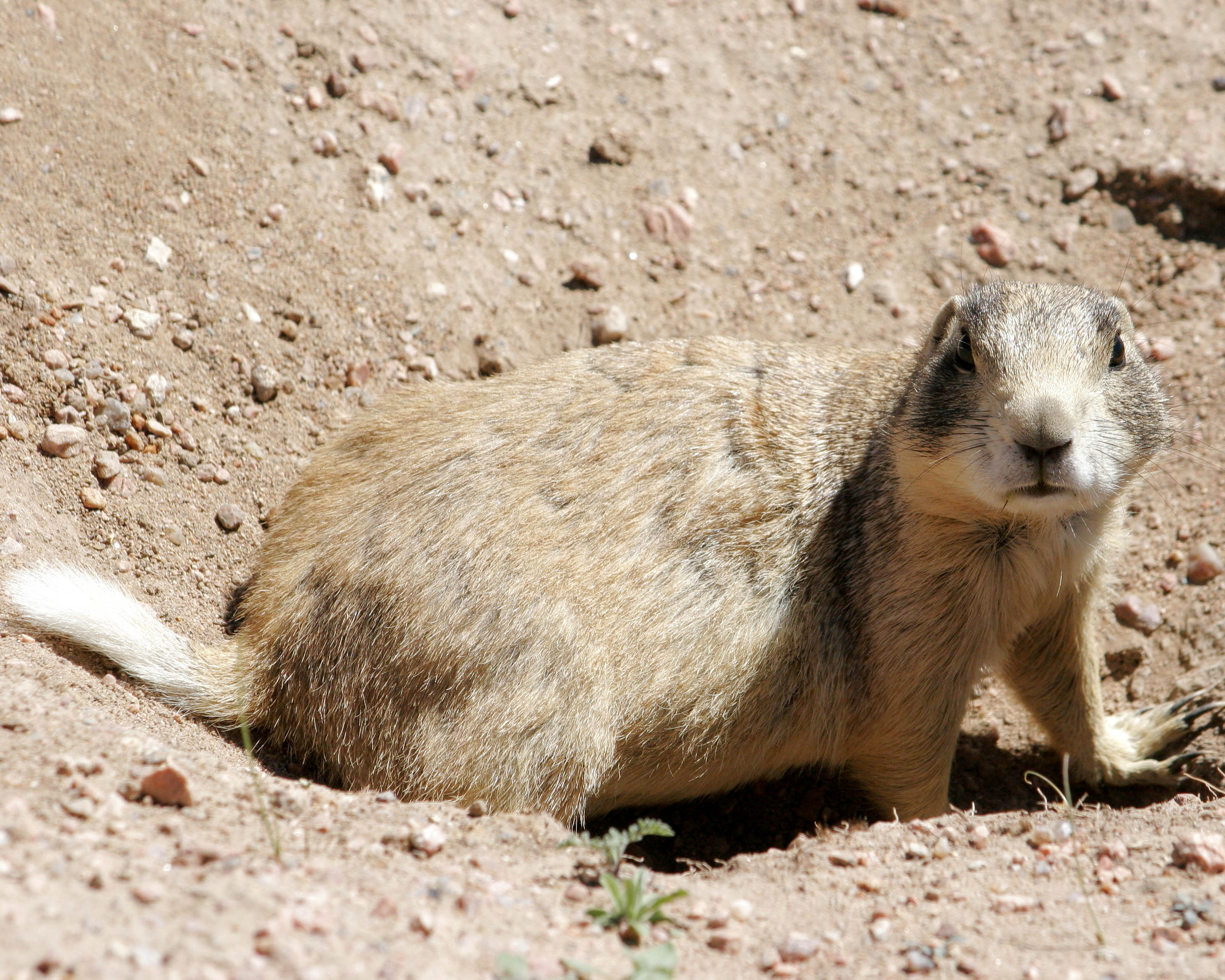

Conservation status
- Least Concern (IUCN 3.1)

- Apparently Secure (NatureServe)

Scientific classification
- Kingdom: Animalia
- Phylum: Chordata
- Class: Mammalia
- Order: Rodentia
- Family: Sciuridae
- Genus: Cynomys
- Species: C. leucurus

Binomial name
- Cynomys leucurus Merriam, 1890
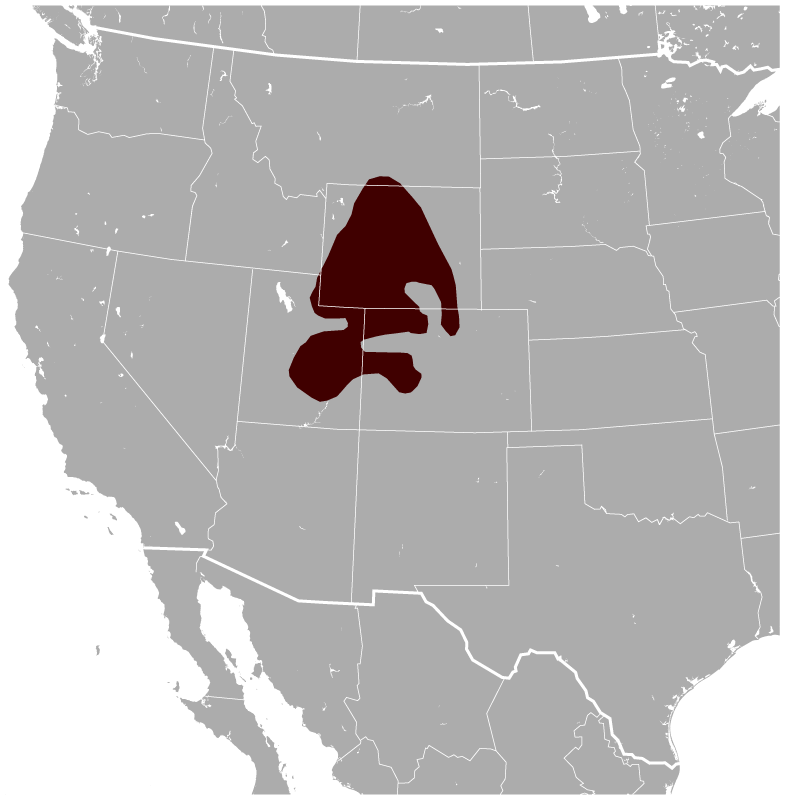
- White-tailed Prairie Dog range

= White-tailed prairie dog =

Species of rodent

The white-tailed prairie dog (Cynomys leucurus) is found in western Wyoming and western Colorado with small areas in eastern Utah and southern Montana. The largest populations are in Wyoming where they are known colloquially as "chiselers". This prairie dog species lives at an elevation between 5,000 and 10,000 feet (1,500 and 3,000 m), generally a higher elevation than other prairie dog species. Its predators include black-footed ferrets, badgers, and golden eagles.

== Description ==
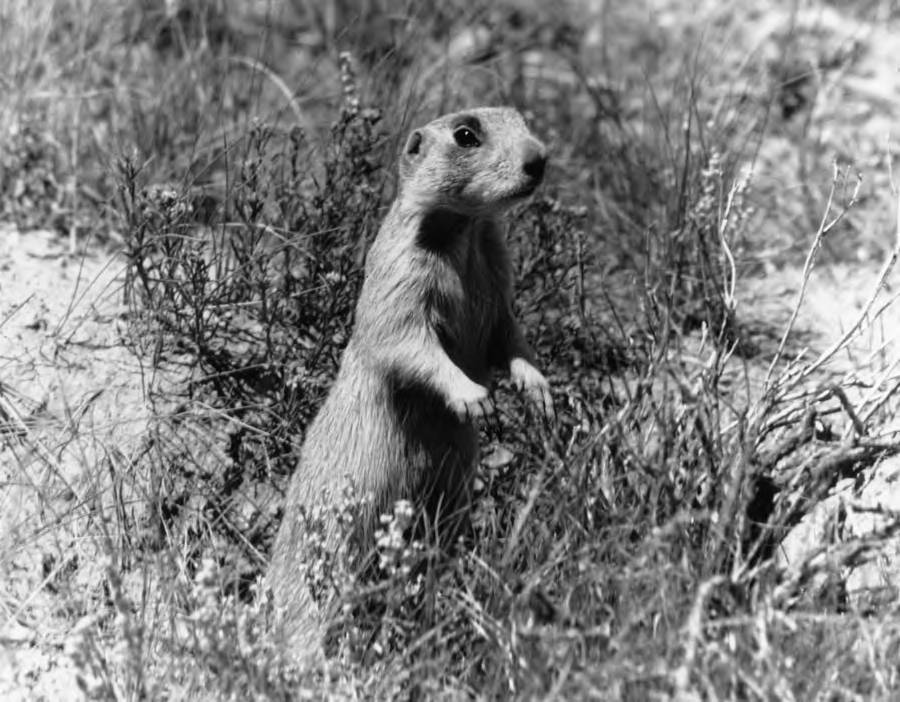
White-tailed prairie dog, standing in vegetation

The white-tailed prairie dog is tan-brown in color, with large eyes and a dark patch on their cheeks above and below each eye. This prairie dog species weighs between 28–53 oz (790–1,500 g), while having a length between 12–16 in (30–41 cm).

== Behavior ==
White-tailed prairie dogs display Interspecific competition with the Wyoming ground squirrel. When the squirrel enters the territory of the prairie dog, the white-tailed prairie dog chases the squirrel. Rarely does the prairie dog capture and kill the squirrel, but when it does, it leaves the squirrel for avian predators, as the prairie dog is an herbivore. Female white-tailed prairie dogs who killed squirrels had increased litter sizes, but the higher her body count, the lower her chances of surviving each subsequent attack. White-tailed prairie dogs are diurnal, being the most active in the morning and afternoon. This species also hibernates in the winter seasons within their burrows and emerge to the surface when warmer seasonal changes occur. Male white-tailed prairie dogs emerge in late February to early March, while the female white-tailed prairie dog emerges roughly 2–3 weeks later.

== Diet ==
White-tailed prairie dogs are herbivorous, feeding mainly on grass, forbs, and sedges, primarily forbs.

== Lifestyle ==
White-tailed prairie dogs have a complex social system and live in colonies. This species uses visual signals and barks for communication. On average, each colony has 6 different "clans" or families. These families forage together for food and resources. The female white-tailed prairie dogs and their pups are sedentary, meaning they stay close to or inside the burrow, while the male seeks the food.

== Conservation status ==
White-tailed prairie dog populations have decreased dramatically, and the remaining population occupies only around 8% of their original range. It is subject to population controls by humans (shooting and poisoning), and threatened by a disease called Sylvatic Plague that can infect all prairie dogs. This animal lives in small communities that are vulnerable to being wiped out by all of these issues. This species appears in the IUCN Red List of Threatened Species, with a status of least concern, last assessed in 2016. Petitions have been made to protect the white-tailed prairie dog, but they have been denied by the United States Fish and Wildlife Service due to insufficient scientific data describing current population trends. This denial is being reconsidered, because former deputy assistant secretary Julie MacDonald has been found to have improperly influenced the scientific basis of the denial. Groups such as the Biodiversity Conservation Alliance are working to legally protect this species.
