= List of Deltochilum species =

This is a list of 114 species in Deltochilum, a genus of dung beetles in the family Scarabaeidae.

== Deltochilum species ==
- Deltochilum abdominalis Martinez, 1947
- Deltochilum acanthus Kohlmann & Solis, 2012
- Deltochilum acropyge Bates, 1887
- Deltochilum aequinoctiale (Buquet, 1844)
- Deltochilum alpercata Silva, Louzada & Vaz-de-Mello, 2015
- Deltochilum altiventris González-Alvarado & Neita, 2026
- Deltochilum amandaarcanjoae Silva, Louzada & Vaz-de-Mello, 2015
- Deltochilum arrowi Paulian, 1939
- Deltochilum arturoi Silva, Louzada & Vaz-de-Mello, 2015
- Deltochilum aspericolle Bates, 1870
- Deltochilum aureopilosum Paulian, 1939
- Deltochilum barbipes Bates, 1870
- Deltochilum batesi Paulian, 1938
- Deltochilum bezdeki González-Alvarado & Vaz-de-Mello, 2014
- Deltochilum bolivariensis González-Alvaredo & Vaz-de-Mello, 2021
- Deltochilum bordoni Halffter & Martinez, 1976
- Deltochilum brasiliense (Castelnau, 1840)
- Deltochilum burmeisteri Harold, 1867
- Deltochilum calcaratum Bates, 1870
- Deltochilum cangalha Silva, Louzada & Vaz-de-Mello, 2015
- Deltochilum carinatum (Westwood, 1837)
- Deltochilum carrilloi González-Alvarado & Vaz-de-Mello, 2014
- Deltochilum crenulipes Paulian, 1938
- Deltochilum cristatum Paulian, 1938
- Deltochilum cristinae Martinez, 1991
- Deltochilum cupreicolle (Blanchard, 1845)
- Deltochilum dentipes Eschscholtz, 1822
- Deltochilum diringshofeni Pereira & Martinez, 1956
- Deltochilum elevatum (Castelnau, 1840)
- Deltochilum elongatum Felsche, 1907
- Deltochilum enceladus Kolbe, 1893
- Deltochilum eurymedon Génier, 2012
- Deltochilum feeri Silva, Louzada & Vaz-de-Mello, 2015
- Deltochilum femorale Bates, 1870
- Deltochilum finestriatum Silva, Louzada & Vaz-de-Mello, 2015
- Deltochilum furcatum (Castelnau, 1840)
- Deltochilum fuscocupreum Bates, 1870
- Deltochilum genieri González-Alvaredo & Vaz-de-Mello, 2021
- Deltochilum gibbosum (Fabricius, 1775)
- Deltochilum gigante Silva & Vaz-de-Mello, 2014
- Deltochilum gilli González-Alvaredo & Vaz-de-Mello, 2021
- Deltochilum granulatum Bates, 1870
- Deltochilum granulosum Paulian, 1933
- Deltochilum guildingii (Westwood, 1835)
- Deltochilum guyanense Paulian, 1933
- Deltochilum howdeni Martinez, 1955
- Deltochilum hypponum (Buquet, 1844)
- Deltochilum icariforme Paulian, 1938
- Deltochilum icaroides Balthasar, 1939
- Deltochilum icarus (Olivier, 1789)
- Deltochilum inaequale Balthasar, 1939
- Deltochilum inesae González-Alvaredo & Vaz-de-Mello, 2021
- Deltochilum irroratum (Castelnau, 1840)
- Deltochilum jocelynae González-Alvaredo & Vaz-de-Mello, 2021
- Deltochilum kolbei Paulian, 1938
- Deltochilum kolleri Silva, Louzada & Vaz-de-Mello, 2015
- Deltochilum komareki Balthasar, 1939
- Deltochilum laetiusculum Bates, 1870
- Deltochilum larseni Silva, Louzada & Vaz-de-Mello, 2015
- Deltochilum lindemannae Balthasar, 1967
- Deltochilum lobipes Bates, 1887
- Deltochilum longiceps Paulian, 1938
- Deltochilum loperae González & Molano, 2010
- Deltochilum louzadai González-Alvarado & Vaz-de-Mello, 2014
- Deltochilum luederwaldti Pereira & Andretta, 1955
- Deltochilum mariafernandae Silva, Vaz-de-Mello & Barclay, 2017
- Deltochilum mexicanum Burmeister, 1848
- Deltochilum molanoi González-Alvarado & Vaz-de-Mello, 2014
- Deltochilum morbillosum Burmeister, 1848
- Deltochilum mourei Pereira, 1949
- Deltochilum multicolor Balthasar, 1939
- Deltochilum nobile González-Alvarado & Neita, 2026
- Deltochilum nonstriatum González-Alvaredo & Vaz-de-Mello, 2021
- Deltochilum orbiculare Lansberge, 1874
- Deltochilum orbignyi (Blanchard, 1845)
- Deltochilum panamensis Howden, 1966
- Deltochilum parapseudoabdominale González-Alvarado & Neita, 2026
- Deltochilum paresi Silva, Louzada & Vaz-de-Mello, 2015
- Deltochilum parile Bates, 1887
- Deltochilum pauxi González-Alvarado & Neita, 2026
- Deltochilum peruanum Paulian, 1938
- Deltochilum picachos González-Alvarado & Neita, 2026
- Deltochilum plebejum Balthasar, 1939
- Deltochilum pretiosum Harold, 1875
- Deltochilum pseudoabdominale González-Alvarado & Neita, 2026
- Deltochilum pseudoicarus Balthasar, 1939
- Deltochilum pseudoparile Paulian, 1938
- Deltochilum punctatum Harold, 1880
- Deltochilum quasistriatum González-Alvaredo & Vaz-de-Mello, 2021
- Deltochilum ritamourae Silva, Louzada & Vaz-de-Mello, 2015
- Deltochilum robustus Molano & González, 2010
- Deltochilum rosamariae Martinez, 1991
- Deltochilum rubripenne (Gory, 1831)
- Deltochilum scabriusculum Bates, 1887
- Deltochilum schefflerorum Silva, Louzada & Vaz-de-Mello, 2015
- Deltochilum sculpturatum Felsche, 1907
- Deltochilum septemstriatum Paulian, 1938
- Deltochilum sericeum Paulian, 1938
- Deltochilum sextuberculatum Bates, 1870
- Deltochilum silphoides Balthasar, 1939
- Deltochilum speciosissimum Balthasar, 1939
- Deltochilum spinipes Paulian, 1938
- Deltochilum streblopodum Silva, Louzada & Vaz-de-Mello, 2015
- Deltochilum sublaeve Bates, 1887
- Deltochilum submetallicum (Castelnau, 1840)
- Deltochilum subrubrum Silva, Louzada & Vaz-de-Mello, 2015
- Deltochilum susanae González-Alvaredo & Vaz-de-Mello, 2021
- Deltochilum tenuistriatum González-Alvaredo & Vaz-de-Mello, 2021
- Deltochilum tessellatum Bates, 1870
- Deltochilum titovidaurrei Silva, Louzada & Vaz-de-Mello, 2015
- Deltochilum trisignatum Harold, 1880
- Deltochilum tumidum (Howden, 1966)
- Deltochilum tyba González-Alvarado & Neita, 2026
- Deltochilum valgum Burmeister, 1873
- Deltochilum ventripuncturatus González-Alvarado & Neita, 2026
- Deltochilum variolosum Burmeister, 1873
- Deltochilum verruciferum Felsche, 1911
- Deltochilum violaceum Paulian, 1938
- Deltochilum violetae Martinez, 1991
- Deltochilum viridescens Martinez, 1948
- Deltochilum viridicatum Silva, Louzada & Vaz-de-Mello, 2015
- Deltochilum viridicupreum Balthasar, 1939
