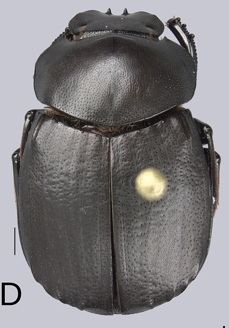

Scientific classification
- Kingdom: Animalia
- Phylum: Arthropoda
- Clade: Pancrustacea
- Class: Insecta
- Order: Coleoptera
- Suborder: Polyphaga
- Infraorder: Scarabaeiformia
- Family: Scarabaeidae
- Genus: Deltochilum
- Species: D. pseudoabdominale

Binomial name
- Deltochilum pseudoabdominale González-Alvarado & Neita, 2026

= Deltochilum pseudoabdominale =

Species of beetle

Deltochilum pseudoabdominale is a species of beetle of the family Scarabaeidae. It is found in Colombia (Arauca, Norte de Santander) and Venezuela (Lara, Mérida y Táchira), where it inhabits forests, conserved secondary forests, rainforests, and Podocarpus forests.

== Description ==
Adults reach a length of about 10.3 mm (0.41 in). They are dark brown dorsally and dark blue ventrally. They are very similar to Deltochilum parapseudoabdominale, Deltochilum picachos and Deltochilum pauxi by having the striae wide, and the males with the first ventrite not elevated and the mesofemur not modified. This species can be separated from parapseudoabdominale by the width of the male first ventrite (at the level of the third ventrite, the width of the first ventrite is narrower than the intermesocoxal distance in this species, whereas it is equal to the intermesocoxal distance in parapseudoabdominale). Additionally, they are separated by the punctures on the anterior part of the head (these punctures are slightly larger than the punctures of the head disc in parapseudoabdominale, but are nearly the same size in pseudoabdominale). From pauxi, this species can be distinguished by the medial angle of the pronotum, which is rounded in pseudoabdominale and salient in pauxi. Furthermore, this species can be separated from picachos by the apical tubercles of the elytra.

== Etymology ==
The species name is derived from the Greek prefix pseudēs- (meaning false or resembling) and abdominale and refers to the sympatry of this species with Deltochilum abdominale.
