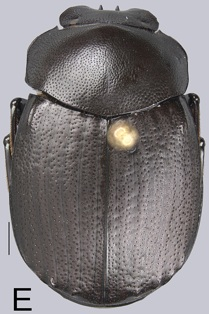

Scientific classification
- Kingdom: Animalia
- Phylum: Arthropoda
- Clade: Pancrustacea
- Class: Insecta
- Order: Coleoptera
- Suborder: Polyphaga
- Infraorder: Scarabaeiformia
- Family: Scarabaeidae
- Genus: Deltochilum
- Species: D. parapseudoabdominale

Binomial name
- Deltochilum parapseudoabdominale González-Alvarado & Neita, 2026

= Deltochilum parapseudoabdominale =

Species of beetle

Deltochilum parapseudoabdominale is a species of beetle of the family Scarabaeidae. It is found in Venezuela (Aragua), where it inhabits forests, conserved secondary forests, rainforests, and Podocarpus forests.

== Description ==
Adults reach a length of about 9.7 mm (0.38 in). They are dark brown with some blue reflections dorsally and dark blue ventrally. They are similar to Deltochilum pseudoabdominale, Deltochilum picachos and Deltochilum pauxi by having the striae wide and the males with the first ventrite not elevated and the mesofemur not modified.

== Etymology ==
The species name is derived from the Greek prefix pará- (meaning beside or allied to) and pseudoabdominale and refers to the strong morphological similarity and close affinity to Deltochilum pseudoabdominale.
