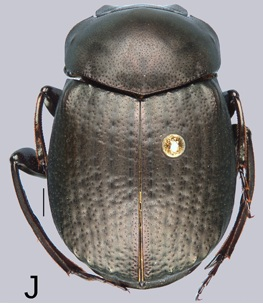

Scientific classification
- Kingdom: Animalia
- Phylum: Arthropoda
- Clade: Pancrustacea
- Class: Insecta
- Order: Coleoptera
- Suborder: Polyphaga
- Infraorder: Scarabaeiformia
- Family: Scarabaeidae
- Genus: Deltochilum
- Species: D. nobile

Binomial name
- Deltochilum nobile González-Alvarado & Neita, 2026

= Deltochilum nobile =

Species of beetle

Deltochilum nobile is a species of beetle of the family Scarabaeidae. It is found in Colombia (Cesar, La Guajira).

== Description ==
Adults reach a length of about 10.4 mm (0.41 in). They are pale greenish-brown dorsally and dark greenish-blue ventrally. They can be distinguished from all other species within the plebejum species group by having the largest punctures on the anterior part of the head, which are larger than the punctures on the head disc. In Deltochilum altiventris, these punctures are only slightly larger than the punctures of the head disc. These species can also be separated by the apical tubercles of the elytra: tubercles on interstriae III, V, and VII in nobile versus interstriae II–VII in altiventris.

== Etymology ==
The species name refers is derived from Latin nobilis (meaning noble) and is given in direct contrast to the closely related and morphologically similar species Deltochilum plebejum (meaning common or plebeian).
