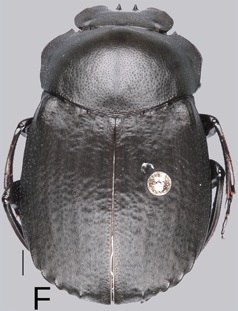

Scientific classification
- Kingdom: Animalia
- Phylum: Arthropoda
- Clade: Pancrustacea
- Class: Insecta
- Order: Coleoptera
- Suborder: Polyphaga
- Infraorder: Scarabaeiformia
- Family: Scarabaeidae
- Genus: Deltochilum
- Species: D. picachos

Binomial name
- Deltochilum picachos González-Alvarado & Neita, 2026

= Deltochilum picachos =

Species of beetle

Deltochilum picachos is a species of beetle of the family Scarabaeidae. It is found in Colombia (Caquetá, Meta).

== Description ==
Adults reach a length of about 10 mm (0.39 in). They are dark brown, but dark greenish-blue ventrally. They are similar to Deltochilum pseudoabdominale, Deltochilum parapseudoabdominale and Deltochilum pauxi by having the striae wide and the males with the first ventrite not elevated and the mesofemur not modified.

== Life history ==
This species has been collected with traps baited with dung and fungi in forest and montane forest. Its altitudinal range extends from 1,000 to 2,000 meters.

== Etymology ==
The species name refers to the type locality, PNN Los Picachos.
