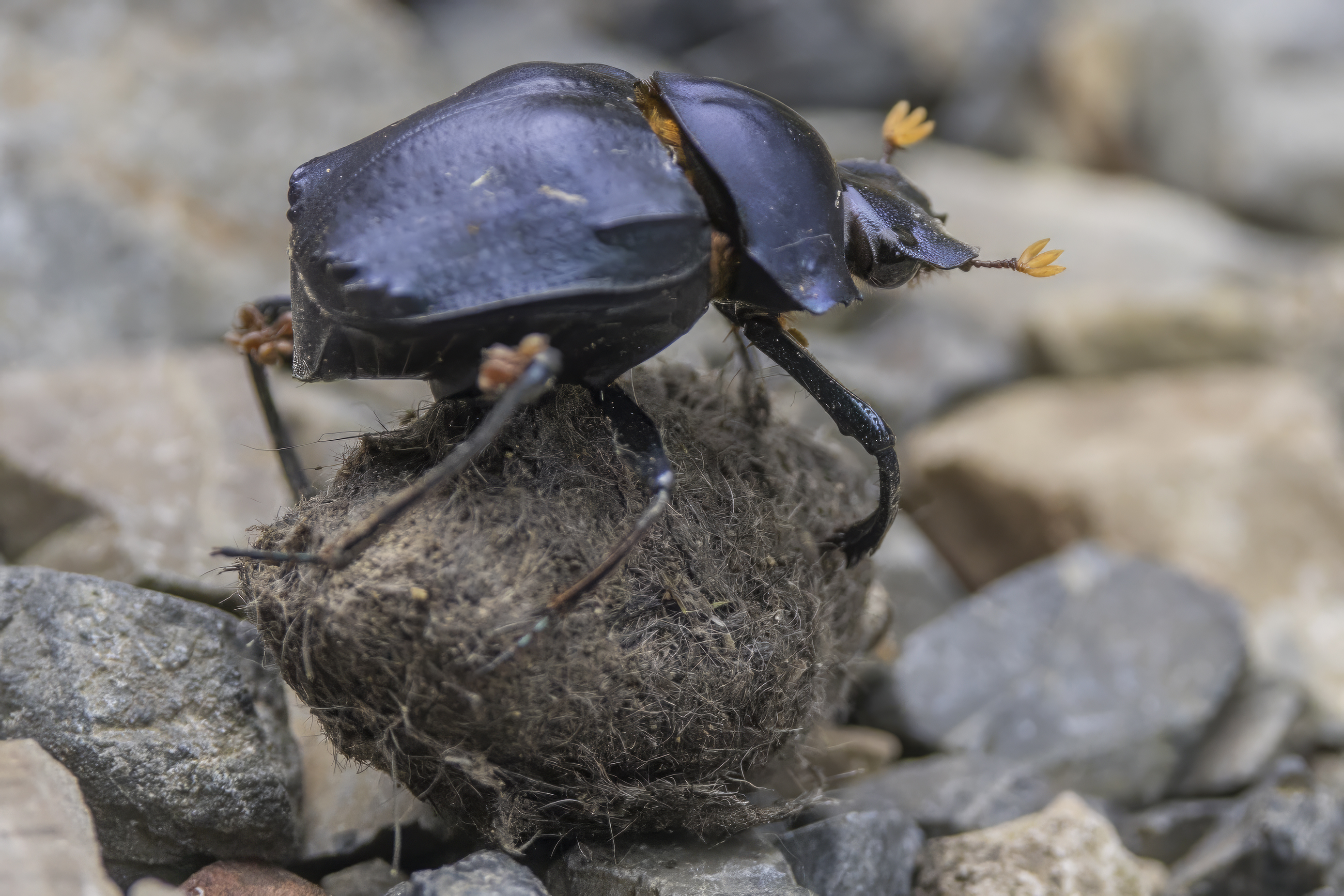

Scientific classification
- Kingdom: Animalia
- Phylum: Arthropoda
- Clade: Pancrustacea
- Class: Insecta
- Order: Coleoptera
- Suborder: Polyphaga
- Infraorder: Scarabaeiformia
- Family: Scarabaeidae
- Genus: Deltochilum
- Species: D. mexicanum

Binomial name
- Deltochilum mexicanum Burmeister, 1848

= Deltochilum mexicanum =

Species of beetle

Deltochilum mexicanum is a species of beetle of the family Scarabaeidae. It is found in Belize, El Salvador, Guatemala, Honduras, Mexico (Chiapas, Durango, Guerrero, Hidalgo, Oaxaca, Puebla, Quintana Roo, Veracruz) and Nicaragua.

== Description ==
Adults reach a length of about 18–27 mm (0.71–1.06 in). They are opaque green or blue in colour.
