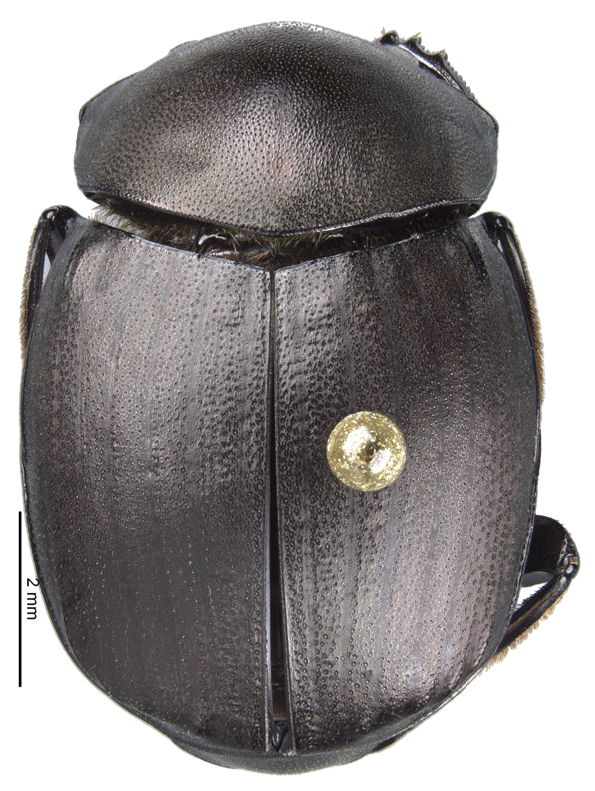

Scientific classification
- Kingdom: Animalia
- Phylum: Arthropoda
- Clade: Pancrustacea
- Class: Insecta
- Order: Coleoptera
- Suborder: Polyphaga
- Infraorder: Scarabaeiformia
- Family: Scarabaeidae
- Genus: Deltochilum
- Species: D. tenuistriatum

Binomial name
- Deltochilum tenuistriatum González-Alvaredo & Vaz-de-Mello, 2021

= Deltochilum tenuistriatum =

Species of beetle

Deltochilum tenuistriatum is a species of beetle of the family Scarabaeidae. It is found in Venezuela (Bolívar).

== Description ==
Adults reach a length of about 8 mm (0.31 in). They are dark green with red reflections dorsally. They are black ventrally, with shiny red reflections on the metaventrite, metaventral process, meso- and metafemora and ventrite VI.

== Etymology ==
The species name is derived from Latin tenuis- (meaning weak) and stria and refers to the ill-defined striae.
