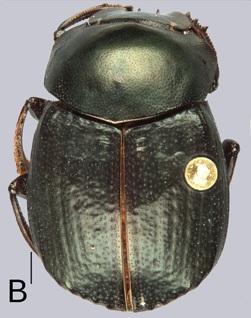

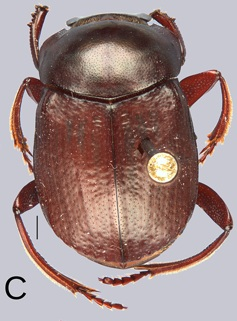

Scientific classification
- Kingdom: Animalia
- Phylum: Arthropoda
- Clade: Pancrustacea
- Class: Insecta
- Order: Coleoptera
- Suborder: Polyphaga
- Infraorder: Scarabaeiformia
- Family: Scarabaeidae
- Genus: Deltochilum
- Species: D. tyba

Binomial name
- Deltochilum tyba González-Alvarado & Neita, 2026

= Deltochilum tyba =

Species of beetle

Deltochilum tyba is a species of beetle of the family Scarabaeidae. It is found in Colombia (Santander).

== Description ==
Adults reach a length of about 10 mm (0.39 in). They are pale green dorsally and brown ventrally. Deltochilum tyba and Deltochilum abdominale are the only two species in which males possess a denticle on the mesofemur. They can be distinguished by the interstrial punctures: these punctures are larger than the interstrial shiny points in tyba, and are nearly the same size as the interstrial shiny points in abdominale.

== Etymology ==
The species name is derived from the Muisca (Chibcha) indigenous word tyba or tybá (meaning Great Captain or Cacique). This name is given to reference the type locality, Capitanejo is the diminutive of Capitán, used in allusion to a local indigenous leader.
