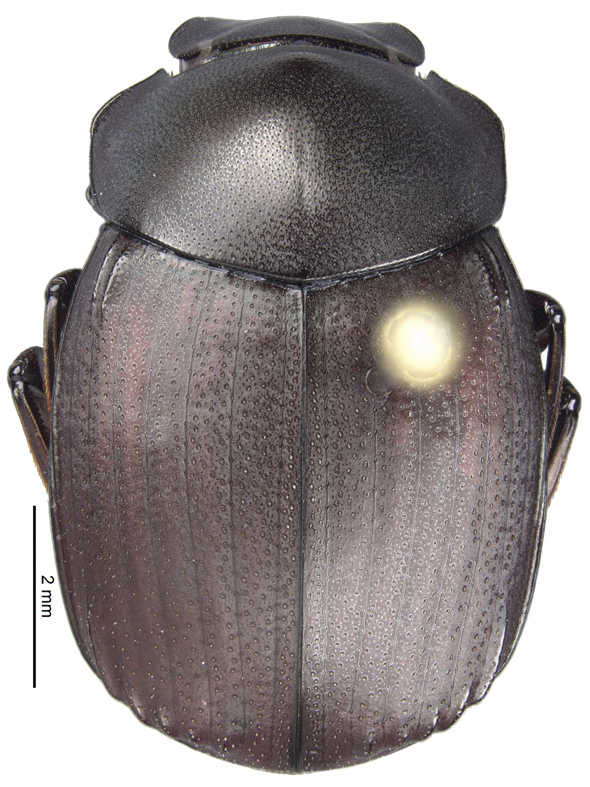

Scientific classification
- Kingdom: Animalia
- Phylum: Arthropoda
- Clade: Pancrustacea
- Class: Insecta
- Order: Coleoptera
- Suborder: Polyphaga
- Infraorder: Scarabaeiformia
- Family: Scarabaeidae
- Genus: Deltochilum
- Species: D. gilli

Binomial name
- Deltochilum gilli González-Alvaredo & Vaz-de-Mello, 2021

= Deltochilum gilli =

Species of beetle

Deltochilum gilli is a species of beetle of the family Scarabaeidae. It is found in Guyana (Mount Wokomung).

== Description ==
Adults reach a length of about 8 mm (0.31 in). They are brown dorsally with light brown elytra. They are also brown ventrally, with shiny red and green reflections on the metaventral disc, meso- and metafemora and ventrite VI.

== Etymology ==
The species is named after Bruce Gill, a prolific scarabaeiodologist and taxonomist and collector of the several specimens of the gilli species-group.
