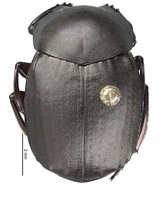

Scientific classification
- Kingdom: Animalia
- Phylum: Arthropoda
- Clade: Pancrustacea
- Class: Insecta
- Order: Coleoptera
- Suborder: Polyphaga
- Infraorder: Scarabaeiformia
- Family: Scarabaeidae
- Genus: Deltochilum
- Species: D. genieri

Binomial name
- Deltochilum genieri González-Alvaredo & Vaz-de-Mello, 2021

= Deltochilum genieri =

Species of beetle

Deltochilum genieri is a species of beetle of the family Scarabaeidae. It is found in Ecuador (Pastaza).

== Description ==
Adults reach a length of about 8.2 mm (0.32 in). They are dark green with some red reflections dorsally. They are black ventrally, with shiny red reflections on the hypomera, metaventrite, metaventral process, mid- and hind legs and ventrite VI.

== Etymology ==
The species is named after the scarabaeoidologist and taxonomist Francois Genier.
