= Deltochilum scabriusculum =

Scientific classification
- Kingdom: Animalia
- Phylum: Arthropoda
- Clade: Pancrustacea
- Class: Insecta
- Order: Coleoptera
- Suborder: Polyphaga
- Infraorder: Scarabaeiformia
- Family: Scarabaeidae
- Genus: Deltochilum
- Species: D. scabriusculum

Binomial name
- Deltochilum scabriusculum Bates, 1887

Synonyms
- Deltochilum scabriusculum montanum Howden, 1966

Species of beetle

Deltochilum scabriusculum is a species of in the beetle family Scarabaeidae. It is found in Belize, Costa Rica, El Salvador, Guatemala, Honduras, Mexico (Aguascalientes, Campeche, Chiapas, Guerrero, Hidalgo, Jalisco, Morelos, Michoacán, Nayarit, Nuevo León, Oaxaca, Puebla, Quintana Roo, San Luis Potosí, Sinaloa, Sonora, Tamaulipas, Veracruz, Yucatán), Nicaragua and in the United States (Texas).
