= Deltochilum kolbei =

Scientific classification
- Kingdom: Animalia
- Phylum: Arthropoda
- Clade: Pancrustacea
- Class: Insecta
- Order: Coleoptera
- Suborder: Polyphaga
- Infraorder: Scarabaeiformia
- Family: Scarabaeidae
- Genus: Deltochilum
- Species: D. kolbei

Binomial name
- Deltochilum kolbei Paulian, 1938

Species of beetle

Deltochilum kolbei is a species of dung beetle in the family Scarabaeidae, subfamily Scarabaeinae. It belongs to the subgenus Aganhyboma within the genus Deltochilum. The species was first described by Paulian in 1938. It is mostly known from South America, although specific distribution records remain limited.

== Description ==
Deltochilum kolbei exhibits a robust, metallic green body with a strong luster. The elytra are slightly darker than the head and pronotum, while the ventral surface is a darker shade of green. Adult individuals typically measure between 15 and 17 mm (0.59 to 0.67 in) in length. The head displays dense punctation, particularly around the clypeus, where the punctures are larger and more closely spaced than those on the interocular region; the anterior margin of each puncture is not sharply defined. The margin between the clypeal teeth and genae is curved outward near the clypeogenal structure. The pronotum is smooth and covered with uniformly distributed, simple punctures.

== Behavior ==
Although specific behavioral studies on D. kolbei are lacking, members of the genus Deltochilum, particularly D.valgum and D.veridescens, are notable for their diverse feeding strategies.Some species within this group exhibit predatory behavior, preying on millipedes, which is rare among dung beetles. Currently, D.kolbei is known to prey on millipedes like its fellow peers.

== Lifecycle ==
The lifecycle of D. kolbei has not been formally documented. However, like other scarabaeine beetles, it is presumed to involve the formation of brood balls from dung or other organic material, within which the larvae develop.
