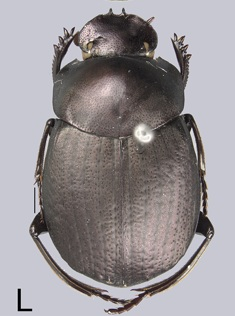

Scientific classification
- Kingdom: Animalia
- Phylum: Arthropoda
- Clade: Pancrustacea
- Class: Insecta
- Order: Coleoptera
- Suborder: Polyphaga
- Infraorder: Scarabaeiformia
- Family: Scarabaeidae
- Genus: Deltochilum
- Species: D. plebejum

Binomial name
- Deltochilum plebejum Balthasar, 1939

= Deltochilum plebejum =

Species of beetle

Deltochilum plebejum is a species of beetle of the family Scarabaeidae. It is found in Venezuela (Maracaibo Basin).

== Description ==
Adults reach a length of about 9.5 mm (0.37 in). They are pale reddish-brown dorsally and dark greenish-blue ventrally. This species shares the narrow striae and the apical tubercles of the elytra (on interstriae III, V, and VII) with Deltochilum nobile, but it can be differentiated by the head punctures. The punctures on the anterior part of the head are nearly the same size as the head disc punctures in plebejum, whereas they are larger in nobile.
