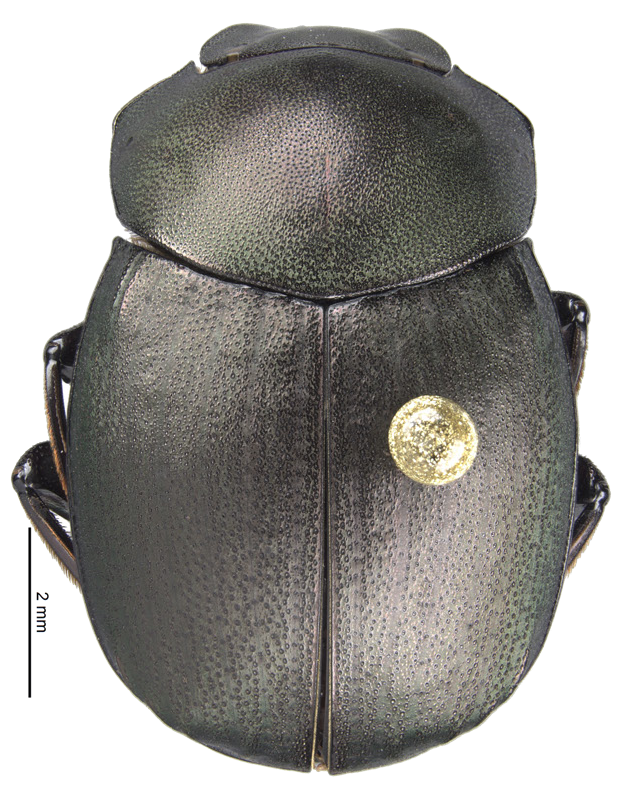

Scientific classification
- Kingdom: Animalia
- Phylum: Arthropoda
- Clade: Pancrustacea
- Class: Insecta
- Order: Coleoptera
- Suborder: Polyphaga
- Infraorder: Scarabaeiformia
- Family: Scarabaeidae
- Genus: Deltochilum
- Species: D. nonstriatum

Binomial name
- Deltochilum nonstriatum González-Alvaredo & Vaz-de-Mello, 2021

= Deltochilum nonstriatum =

Species of beetle

Deltochilum nonstriatum is a species of beetle of the family Scarabaeidae. It is found in Venezuela (Bolívar).

== Description ==
Adults reach a length of about 8.4 mm (0.33 in). They are dark green with red reflections dorsally. They are black ventrally, with shiny red reflections on the anterior area of the metaventral process, meso- and metafemora and ventrite VI.

== Etymology ==
The species name is derived from Latin non- (meaning not) and stria and refers to the inconspicuous elytral striae.
