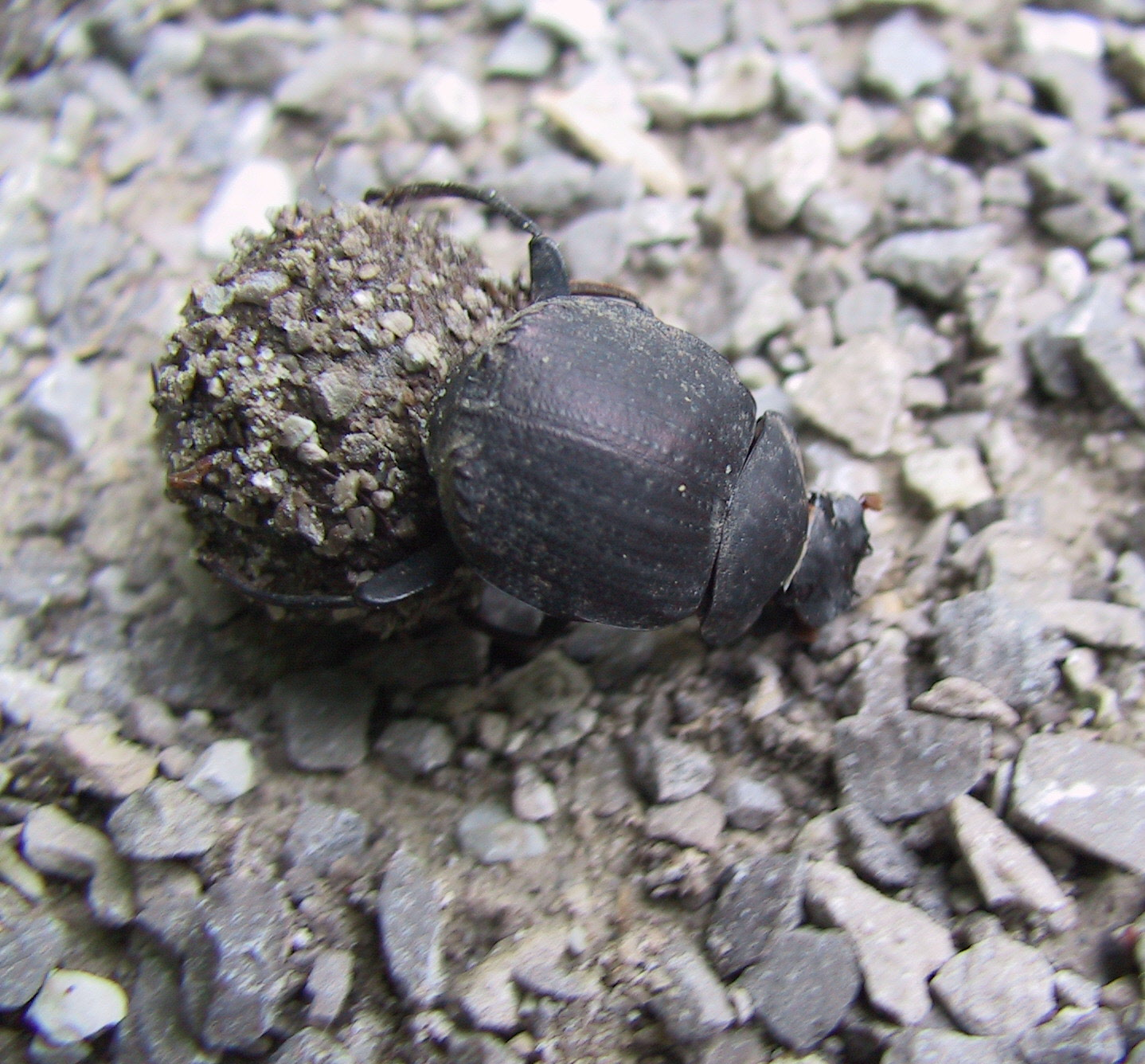

Scientific classification
- Kingdom: Animalia
- Phylum: Arthropoda
- Clade: Pancrustacea
- Class: Insecta
- Order: Coleoptera
- Suborder: Polyphaga
- Infraorder: Scarabaeiformia
- Family: Scarabaeidae
- Genus: Deltochilum
- Species: D. gibbosum

Binomial name
- Deltochilum gibbosum (Fabricius, 1775)

Synonyms
- Scarabaeus gibbosus Fabricius, 1775

= Deltochilum gibbosum =

Species of beetle

Deltochilum gibbosum, the humpback dung beetle, is a species of dung beetle in the family Scarabaeidae. It is a member of subgenus Hybomidium Shipp, 1897 and is found in the southeastern United States.

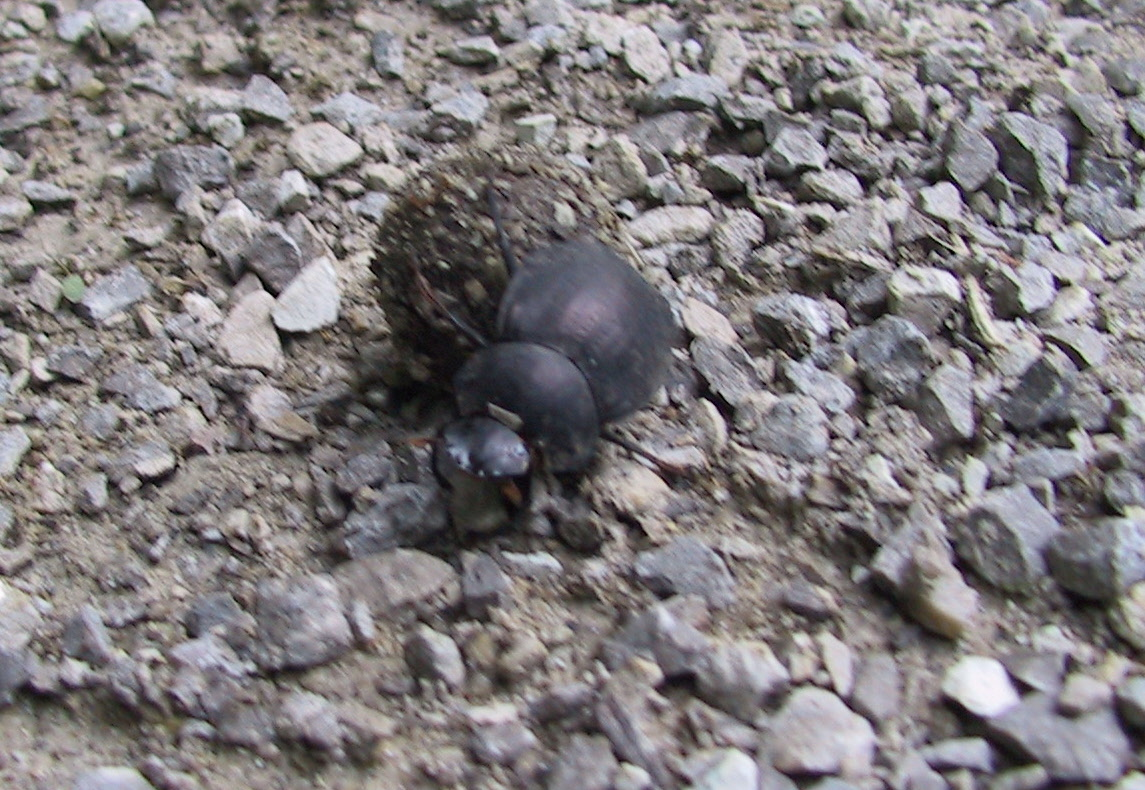
Humpback dung beetle, Deltochilum gibbosum

A variety described by Henry Walter Bates in 1887, D. gibbosum var. sublaeve, has been classified as a separate species D. sublaeve by González-Alvarado and Vaz-de-Mello. The same authors regard D. gibbosum subsp. panamensis Howden, 1966 as a separate species D. panamensis.
