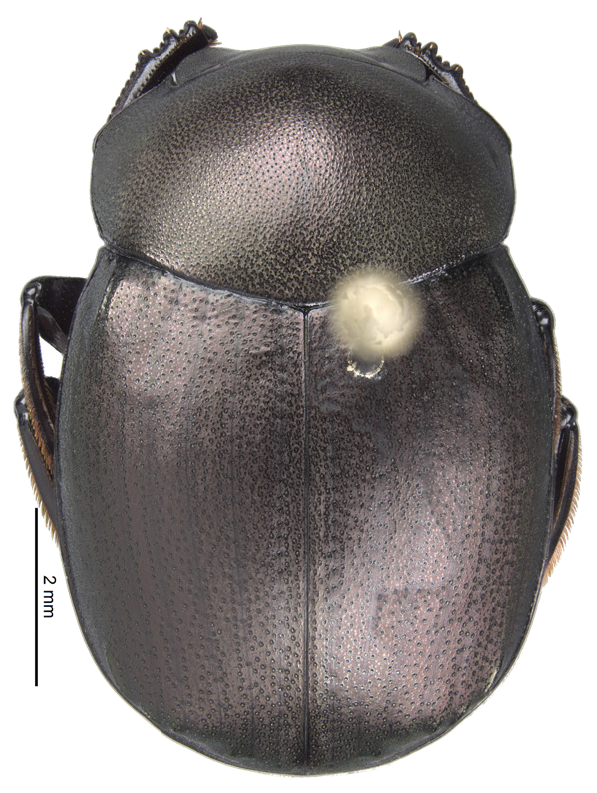

Scientific classification
- Kingdom: Animalia
- Phylum: Arthropoda
- Clade: Pancrustacea
- Class: Insecta
- Order: Coleoptera
- Suborder: Polyphaga
- Infraorder: Scarabaeiformia
- Family: Scarabaeidae
- Genus: Deltochilum
- Species: D. quasistriatum

Binomial name
- Deltochilum quasistriatum González-Alvaredo & Vaz-de-Mello, 2021

= Deltochilum quasistriatum =

Species of beetle

Deltochilum quasistriatum is a species of beetle of the family Scarabaeidae. It is found in Guyana (Takutu Mountains).

== Description ==
Adults reach a length of about 8.1 mm (0.32 in). They are dark green with red reflections on the pronotum, and the elytra dark brown with some red reflections. They are dark brown ventrally, with a few shiny red reflections on ventrite VI and with the meso- and meta-legs light brown.

== Etymology ==
The species name is derived from Latin quasi- (meaning almost) and stria and refers to the ill-defined striae.
