= Deltochilum luederwaldti =

Scientific classification
- Kingdom: Animalia
- Phylum: Arthropoda
- Clade: Pancrustacea
- Class: Insecta
- Order: Coleoptera
- Suborder: Polyphaga
- Infraorder: Scarabaeiformia
- Family: Scarabaeidae
- Genus: Deltochilum
- Species: D. luederwaldti

Binomial name
- Deltochilum luederwaldti Pereira & Andretta, 1955

Species of beetle

Deltochilum luederwaldti is a species of beetle of the family Scarabaeidae. It is found in Colombia (Boyacá, Santander) and Ecuador (Quito).

== Description ==
Adults reach a length of about 18–25 mm (0.71–0.98 in). They are iridescent red with a green shimmer.
