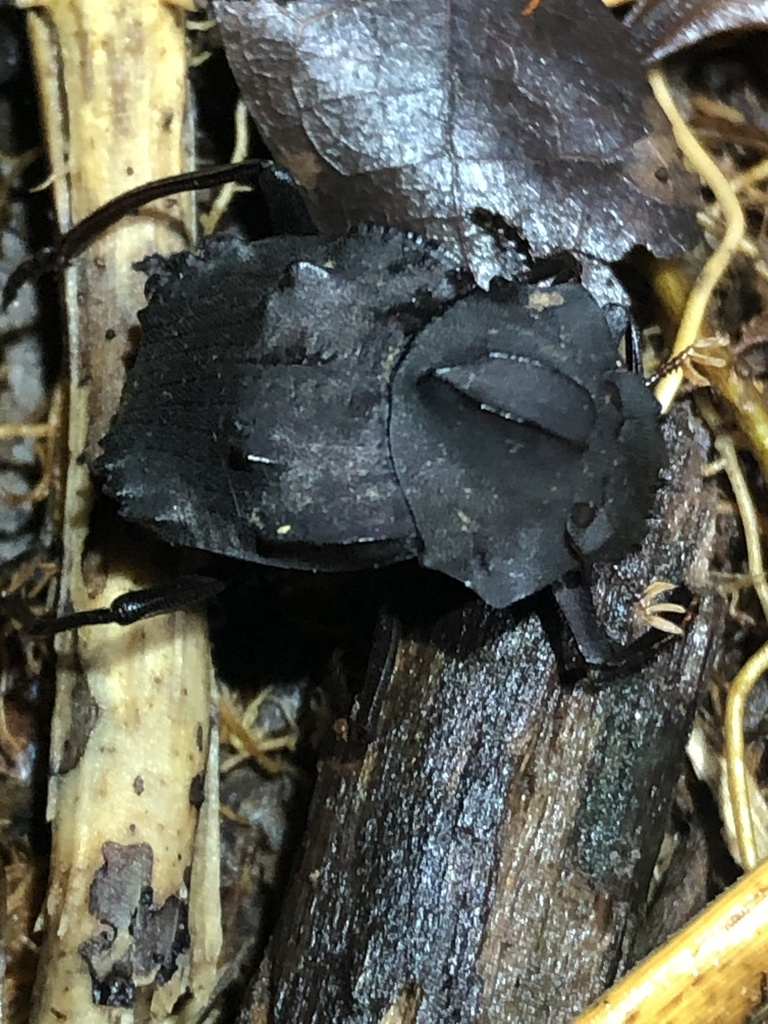

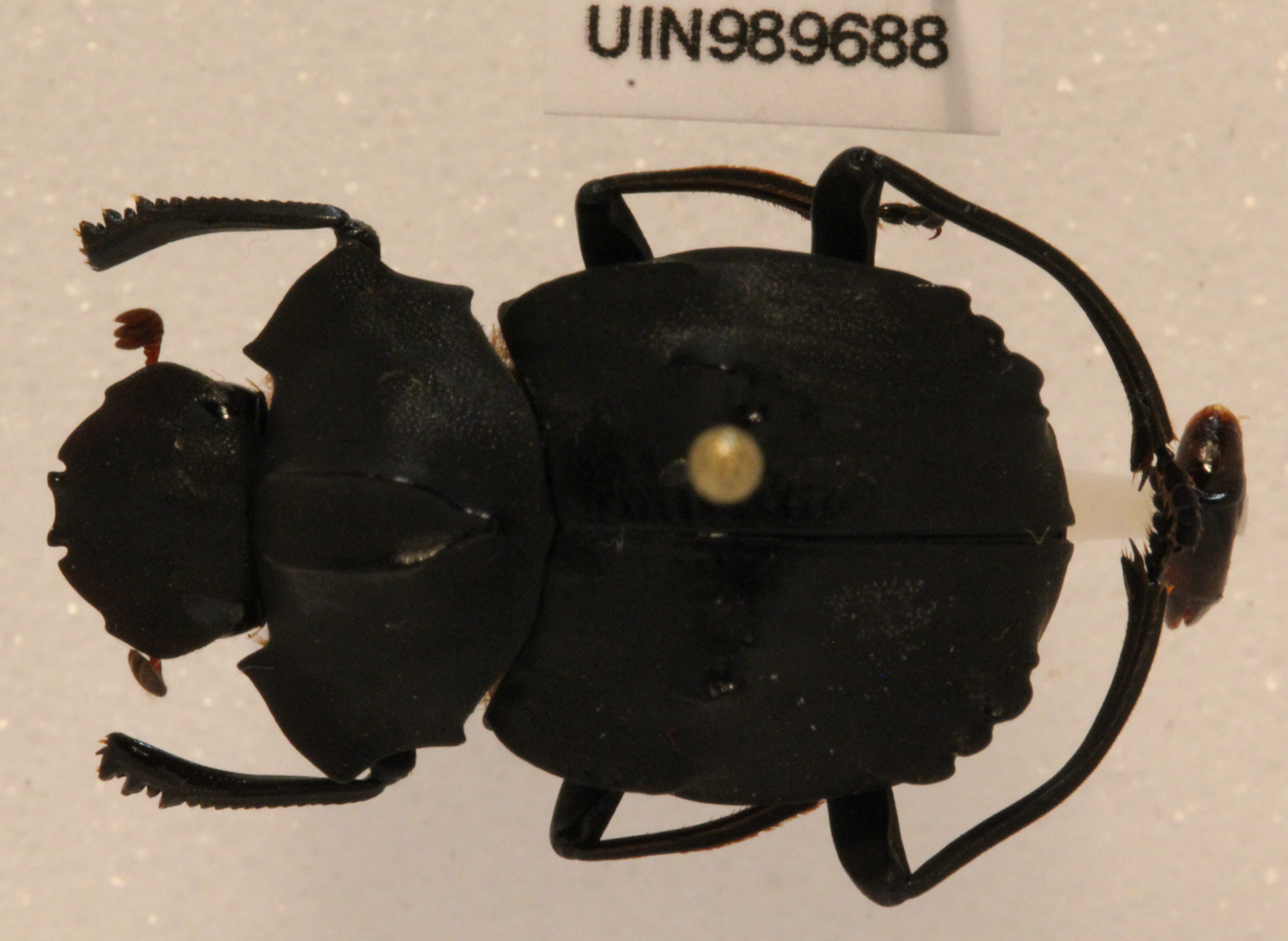

Scientific classification
- Kingdom: Animalia
- Phylum: Arthropoda
- Clade: Pancrustacea
- Class: Insecta
- Order: Coleoptera
- Suborder: Polyphaga
- Infraorder: Scarabaeiformia
- Family: Scarabaeidae
- Genus: Deltochilum
- Species: D. carinatum

Binomial name
- Deltochilum carinatum (Westwood, 1837)

Synonyms
- Hyboma carinata Westwood, 1837; Hyboma dromedarius Laporte, 1840; Deltochilum (Hyboma) monstrosa Dejean, 1836

= Deltochilum carinatum =

Species of beetle

Deltochilum carinatum is a species of beetle of the family Scarabaeidae. It is found in Bolivia, Brazil (Acre, Amazonas, Maranhão, Mato Grosso, Pará, Rondônia, Roraima), Colombia, Ecuador, French Guiana, Guyana, Peru, Suriname and possibly Venezuela.
