= Deltochilum loperae =

Scientific classification
- Kingdom: Animalia
- Phylum: Arthropoda
- Clade: Pancrustacea
- Class: Insecta
- Order: Coleoptera
- Suborder: Polyphaga
- Infraorder: Scarabaeiformia
- Family: Scarabaeidae
- Genus: Deltochilum
- Species: D. loperae

Binomial name
- Deltochilum loperae González & Molano, 2010

Species of beetle

Deltochilum loperae is a species of beetle of the family Scarabaeidae. It is found in Colombia and Ecuador.

== Description ==
Adults reach a length of about 22–27 mm (0.87–1.06 in). They are black.

== Etymology ==
The species is dedicated to a colleague and friend of the authors, Alejandro Lopera.
