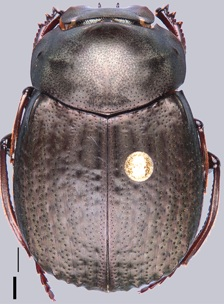

Scientific classification
- Kingdom: Animalia
- Phylum: Arthropoda
- Clade: Pancrustacea
- Class: Insecta
- Order: Coleoptera
- Suborder: Polyphaga
- Infraorder: Scarabaeiformia
- Family: Scarabaeidae
- Genus: Deltochilum
- Species: D. ventripuncturatus

Binomial name
- Deltochilum ventripuncturatus González-Alvarado & Neita, 2026

= Deltochilum ventripuncturatus =

Species of beetle

Deltochilum ventripuncturatus is a species of beetle of the family Scarabaeidae. It is found in Colombia (Magdalena), where it appears to be restricted to the Sierra Nevada de Santa Marta.

== Description ==
Adults reach a length of about 10.7 mm (0.42 in). They are pale greenish-brown dorsally and dark copperish-green ventrally. They can be distinguished from all other species within the plebejum species group by the unique combination of characters in males: the mesofemur possesses a basal protuberance, the first ventrite is elevated and with small punctures. Also, it can be separated from all other species of group by the head punctures, the punctures on the anterior part of the head are smaller than the punctures of the head disc, in the other species of the group, the punctures on the anterior part of the head are equal to or larger than the punctures of the head disc.

== Etymology ==
The species name refers is derived from Latin ventris (meaning abdomen) and puncturatus (meaning punctured) and refers to the presence of small and dense punctures on the first abdominal ventrite, a unique diagnostic character of this species.
