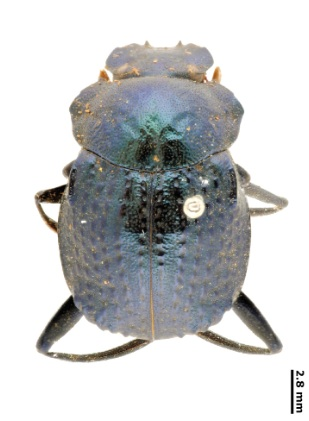

Scientific classification
- Kingdom: Animalia
- Phylum: Arthropoda
- Clade: Pancrustacea
- Class: Insecta
- Order: Coleoptera
- Suborder: Polyphaga
- Infraorder: Scarabaeiformia
- Family: Scarabaeidae
- Genus: Deltochilum
- Species: D. tessellatum

Binomial name
- Deltochilum tessellatum Bates, 1870

= Deltochilum tessellatum =

Species of beetle

Deltochilum tessellatum is a species of beetle of the family Scarabaeidae. It is found in Colombia, Ecuador and Peru.

== Description ==
Adults reach a length of about 17–25 mm (0.67–0.98 in). They are dark blue or black and shiny.
