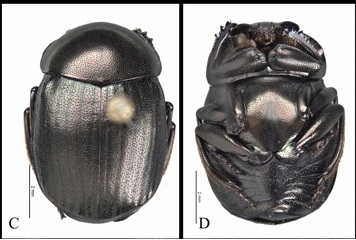

Scientific classification
- Kingdom: Animalia
- Phylum: Arthropoda
- Clade: Pancrustacea
- Class: Insecta
- Order: Coleoptera
- Suborder: Polyphaga
- Infraorder: Scarabaeiformia
- Family: Scarabaeidae
- Genus: Deltochilum
- Species: D. bolivariense

Binomial name
- Deltochilum bolivariense González-Alvaredo & Vaz-de-Mello, 2021

Synonyms
- Deltochilum bolivariensis

= Deltochilum bolivariense =

Species of beetle

Deltochilum bolivariense is a species of beetle of the family Scarabaeidae. It is found in Venezuela (Bolivar).

== Description ==
Adults reach a length of about 7.4 mm (0.29 in). They are copper coloured with green reflections dorsally and ventrally.

== Etymology ==
The species is named is derived from the combination of Bolivar plus -ensis (meaning of or from a place) and refers to the state of Bolivar and Ciudad Bolivar, state and city (70 km from that city) where all the specimens known of this species were collected.
