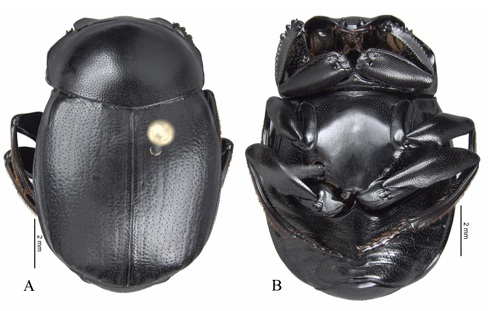

Scientific classification
- Kingdom: Animalia
- Phylum: Arthropoda
- Clade: Pancrustacea
- Class: Insecta
- Order: Coleoptera
- Suborder: Polyphaga
- Infraorder: Scarabaeiformia
- Family: Scarabaeidae
- Genus: Deltochilum
- Species: D. inesae

Binomial name
- Deltochilum inesae González-Alvaredo & Vaz-de-Mello, 2021

= Deltochilum inesae =

Species of beetle

Deltochilum inesae is a species of beetle of the family Scarabaeidae. It is found in Colombia (Caqueta, Guaviare).

== Description ==
Adults reach a length of about 11 mm (0.43 in). They are black dorsally and ventrally.

== Etymology ==
The species is named after Maria Ines Velasco, the first author's grandmother.
