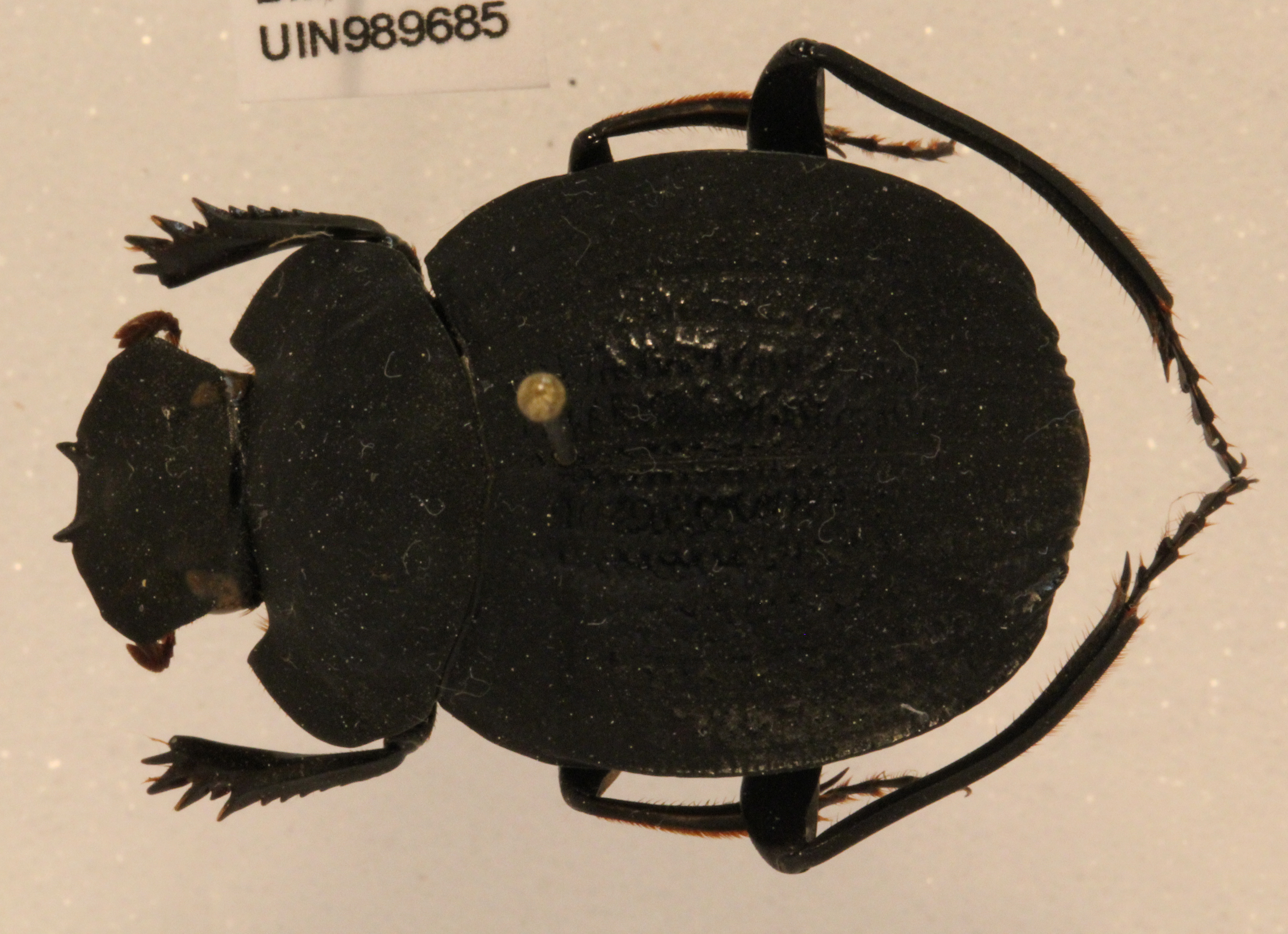

Scientific classification
- Kingdom: Animalia
- Phylum: Arthropoda
- Clade: Pancrustacea
- Class: Insecta
- Order: Coleoptera
- Suborder: Polyphaga
- Infraorder: Scarabaeiformia
- Family: Scarabaeidae
- Genus: Deltochilum
- Species: D. orbiculare

Binomial name
- Deltochilum orbiculare Lansberge, 1874

= Deltochilum orbiculare =

Species of beetle

Deltochilum orbiculare is a species of beetle of the family Scarabaeidae. It is found in Bolivia, Brazil (Acre, Amazonas, Maranhão, Mato Grosso, Pará, Rondônia), Colombia, Ecuador, French Guiana, Peru and Suriname.

== Description ==
Adults reach a length of about 21–25 mm (0.83–0.98 in). They are black.
