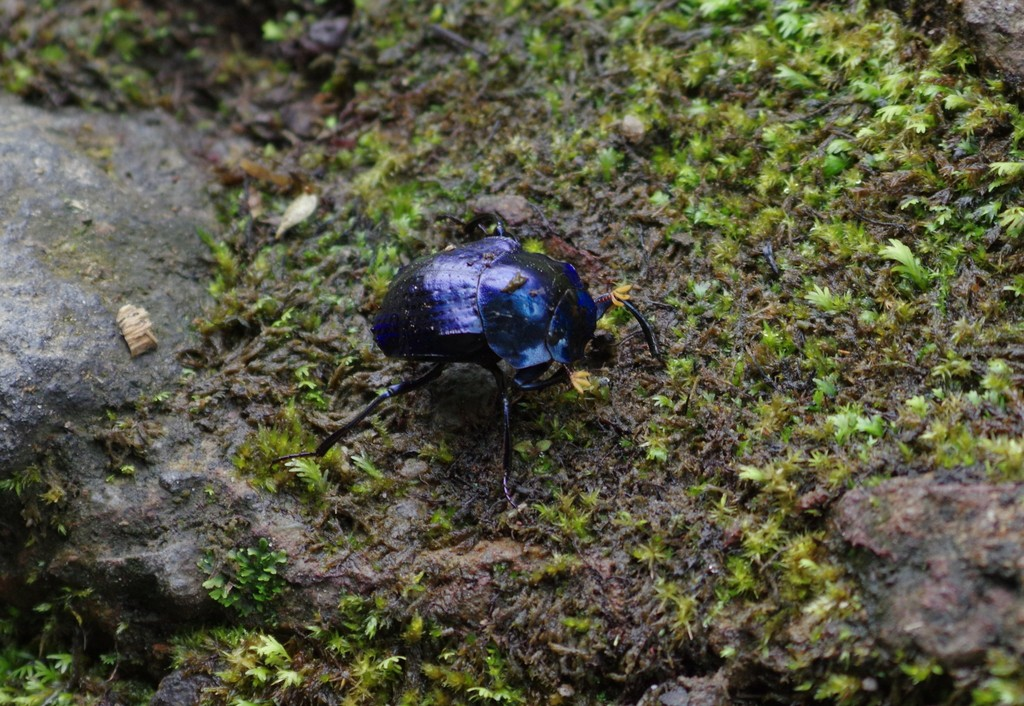

Scientific classification
- Kingdom: Animalia
- Phylum: Arthropoda
- Clade: Pancrustacea
- Class: Insecta
- Order: Coleoptera
- Suborder: Polyphaga
- Infraorder: Scarabaeiformia
- Family: Scarabaeidae
- Genus: Deltochilum
- Species: D. hypponum

Binomial name
- Deltochilum hypponum (Buquet, 1844)

Synonyms
- Hyboma hyppona Buquet, 1844; Deltochilum speciosum Burmeister, 1848; Hyboma arrogans Buquet, 1844

= Deltochilum hypponum =

Species of beetle

Deltochilum hypponum is a species of beetle of the family Scarabaeidae. It is found in Colombia, Ecuador and Peru.

== Description ==
Adults reach a length of about 9–22 mm (0.35–0.87 in). They are iridescent green, with flashes of red, dark blue, dark green or black and with a coppery shimmer.
