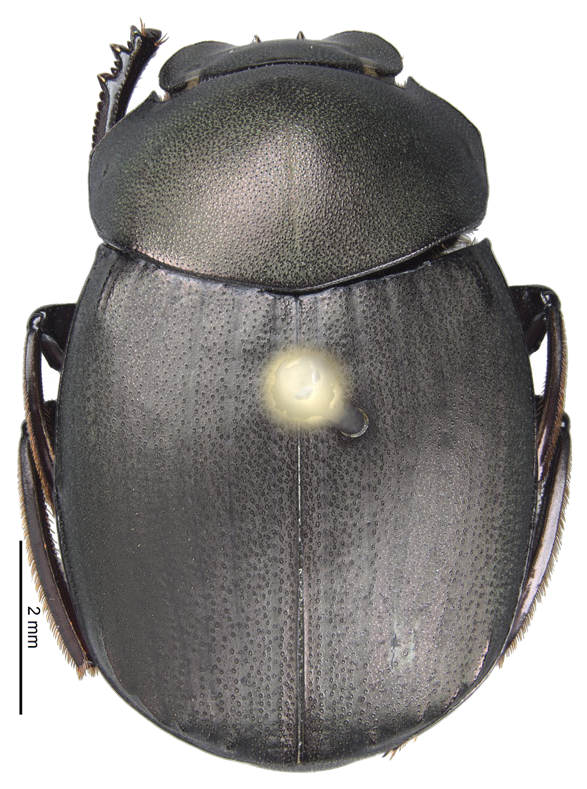

Scientific classification
- Kingdom: Animalia
- Phylum: Arthropoda
- Clade: Pancrustacea
- Class: Insecta
- Order: Coleoptera
- Suborder: Polyphaga
- Infraorder: Scarabaeiformia
- Family: Scarabaeidae
- Genus: Deltochilum
- Species: D. jocelynae

Binomial name
- Deltochilum jocelynae González-Alvaredo & Vaz-de-Mello, 2021

= Deltochilum jocelynae =

Species of beetle

Deltochilum jocelynae is a species of beetle of the family Scarabaeidae. It is found in Guyana (Mount Wokomung).

== Description ==
Adults reach a length of about 8.1 mm (0.32 in). They are dark green with some red reflections dorsally. They are black ventrally, with shiny red reflections on the anterior area of the metaventral process, meso- and metafemora and ventrite VI.

== Etymology ==
The species is named after Jocelyn Gill.
