= Deltochilum orbignyi =

Scientific classification
- Kingdom: Animalia
- Phylum: Arthropoda
- Clade: Pancrustacea
- Class: Insecta
- Order: Coleoptera
- Suborder: Polyphaga
- Infraorder: Scarabaeiformia
- Family: Scarabaeidae
- Genus: Deltochilum
- Species: D. orbignyi

Binomial name
- Deltochilum orbignyi (Blanchard, 1845)

Synonyms
- Hyboma orbignyi Blanchard, 1845; Deltochilum amazonicum Bates, 1887

Species of beetle

Deltochilum orbignyi is a species of beetle of the family Scarabaeidae. It is found in Argentina, Bolivia, Colombia, Ecuador, Peru, Brazil and possibly Venezuela.

== Description ==
Adults reach a length of about 20–25 mm (0.79–0.98 in). They are opaque and black.

== Subspecies ==
- Deltochilum orbignyi orbignyi (Argentina, Bolivia)
- Deltochilum orbignyi amazonicum Bates, 1887 (Bolivia, Colombia, Ecuador, Peru, Brazil: Acre, Amazonas, Mato Grosso, Pará, Rondônia)
