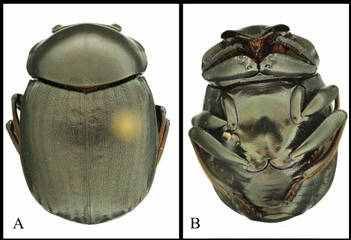

Scientific classification
- Kingdom: Animalia
- Phylum: Arthropoda
- Clade: Pancrustacea
- Class: Insecta
- Order: Coleoptera
- Suborder: Polyphaga
- Infraorder: Scarabaeiformia
- Family: Scarabaeidae
- Genus: Deltochilum
- Species: D. susanae

Binomial name
- Deltochilum susanae González-Alvaredo & Vaz-de-Mello, 2021

= Deltochilum susanae =

Species of beetle

Deltochilum susanae is a species of beetle of the family Scarabaeidae. It is found in Colombia (Vichada, Meta).

== Description ==
Adults reach a length of about 9.4 mm (0.37 in). They are green with copper reflections dorsally and ventrally.

== Etymology ==
The species is named after Susana Cruz, a friend of the first author.
