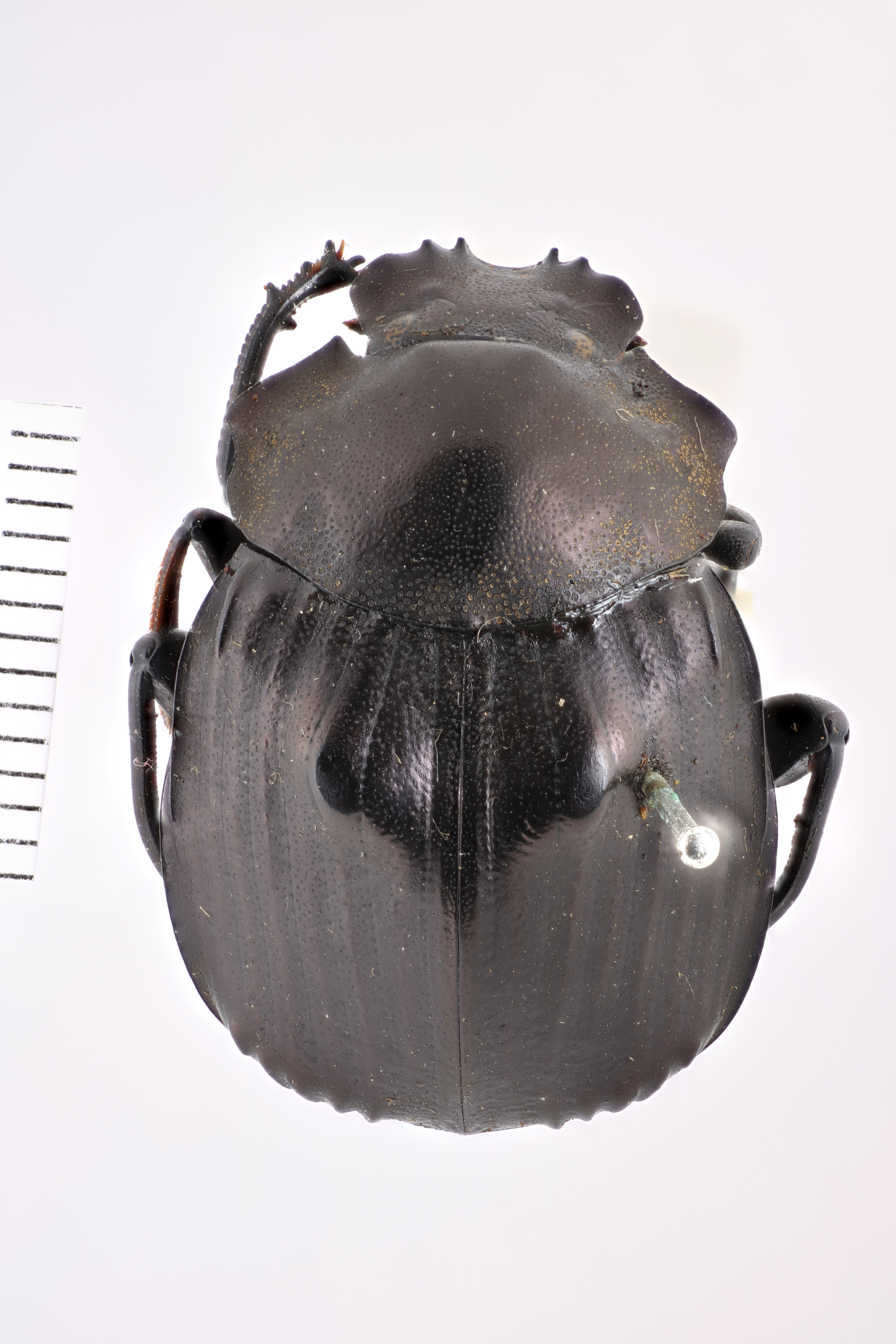

Scientific classification
- Kingdom: Animalia
- Phylum: Arthropoda
- Clade: Pancrustacea
- Class: Insecta
- Order: Coleoptera
- Suborder: Polyphaga
- Infraorder: Scarabaeiformia
- Family: Scarabaeidae
- Genus: Deltochilum
- Species: D. lobipes

Binomial name
- Deltochilum lobipes Bates, 1887

= Deltochilum lobipes =

Species of beetle

Deltochilum lobipes is a species of beetle of the family Scarabaeidae. It is found in Belize, Colombia, Costa Rica, El Salvador, Guatemala, Honduras, Mexico (Campeche, Chiapas, Oaxaca, Quintana Roo, Tamaulipas, Veracruz, Yucatán) and Nicaragua.

== Description ==
Adults reach a length of about 15–25 mm (0.59–0.98 in). They are opaque and black.
