= Deltochilum cristinae =

Scientific classification
- Kingdom: Animalia
- Phylum: Arthropoda
- Clade: Pancrustacea
- Class: Insecta
- Order: Coleoptera
- Suborder: Polyphaga
- Infraorder: Scarabaeiformia
- Family: Scarabaeidae
- Genus: Deltochilum
- Species: D. cristinae

Binomial name
- Deltochilum cristinae Martinez, 1991

Synonyms
- Calhyboma cristinae

Species of beetle

Deltochilum cristinae is a species of beetle of the family Scarabaeidae. It is found in Colombia and Venezuela.

== Description ==
Adults reach a length of about 19–23 mm (0.75–0.91 in). They have a copper or dull blue colour.
