= Deltochilum robustus =

Scientific classification
- Kingdom: Animalia
- Phylum: Arthropoda
- Clade: Pancrustacea
- Class: Insecta
- Order: Coleoptera
- Suborder: Polyphaga
- Infraorder: Scarabaeiformia
- Family: Scarabaeidae
- Genus: Deltochilum
- Species: D. robustus

Binomial name
- Deltochilum robustus Molano & González, 2010

Species of beetle

Deltochilum robustus is a species of beetle of the family Scarabaeidae. It is found in Bolivia, Colombia, Ecuador and Peru.

== Description ==
Adults reach a length of about 20–23 mm (0.79–0.91 in). The head, pronotum and pygidium are olive green with a coppery reflection, while the elytra, abdomen, tibiae and tarsi are coppery with a green reflection.
