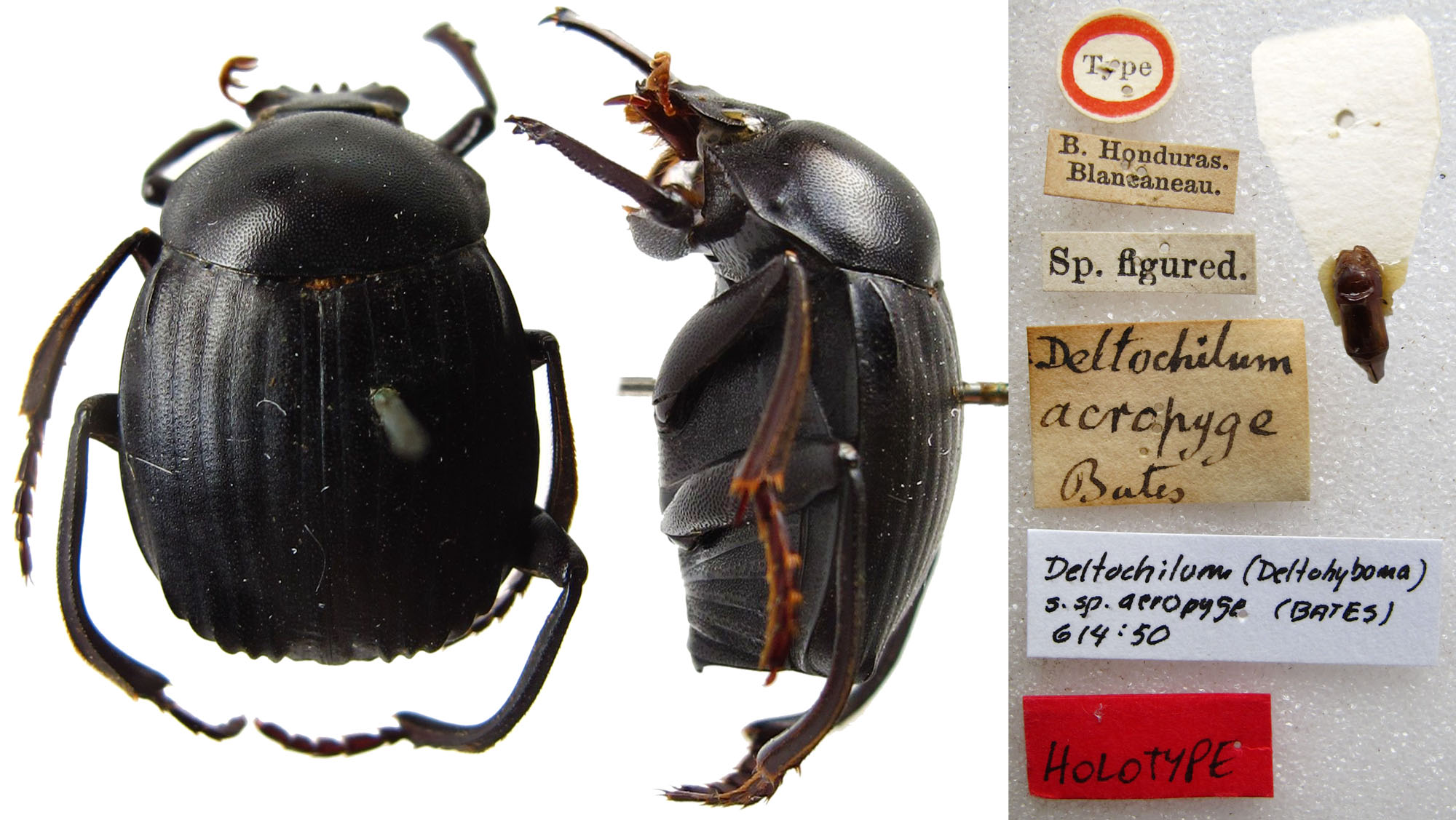

Scientific classification
- Kingdom: Animalia
- Phylum: Arthropoda
- Clade: Pancrustacea
- Class: Insecta
- Order: Coleoptera
- Suborder: Polyphaga
- Infraorder: Scarabaeiformia
- Family: Scarabaeidae
- Genus: Deltochilum
- Species: D. valgum

Binomial name
- Deltochilum valgum Burmeister, 1873

= Deltochilum valgum =

Species of beetle

Deltochilum valgum is a nocturnal, Neotropical species of dung beetle in the family Scarabaeidae, which has evolved a predatory lifestyle. While most other members of the true dung beetle subfamily feed on faeces or decomposing matter, D. valgum is highly specialised for eating millipedes; such a transition from scavenger to carnivore is rare. Whether this is novel adaption in this species or an ancestral adaption in the genus is unclear; at least two other species, Deltochilum kolbei and D. viridescens, which are not particularly closely related to D. valgum, also kill and feed on millipedes.

D. valgum prefers live millipedes to dead ones, and seems to take no other food. It tends to kill millipedes much larger than itself, at 25–110 millimetres (1.0–4.3 in) long. The beetle itself is about 8 mm (0.3 in) long. In a typical attack, the beetle grasps the millipede's body with its mid and elongated, curved hind legs and then bites into the coiling prey at a joint between body segments. Sometimes this results in the prey being decapitated. The beetle then drags the victim to feed on it.

D. valgum is widely distributed in Central American rainforests. Two subspecies were recognised: D. v. acropyge Bates, 1887 and D. v. longiceps Paulian, 1938, but these are now considered separate species.
