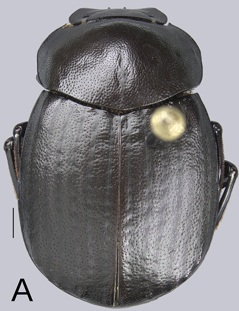

Scientific classification
- Kingdom: Animalia
- Phylum: Arthropoda
- Clade: Pancrustacea
- Class: Insecta
- Order: Coleoptera
- Suborder: Polyphaga
- Infraorder: Scarabaeiformia
- Family: Scarabaeidae
- Genus: Deltochilum
- Species: D. abdominale

Binomial name
- Deltochilum abdominale Martínez, 1947

Synonyms
- Deltochilum abdominalis

= Deltochilum abdominale =

Species of beetle

Deltochilum abdominale is a species of beetle of the family Scarabaeidae. It is found in Colombia (Norte de Santander) and Venezuela (Aragua, Miranda, Monagas, Táchira, Yaracuy), where they inhabit forests, submontane forests and forests mixed with coffee at altitudes ranging from 400 to about 1,400 meters above sea level.

== Description ==
Adults reach a length of about 10 mm (0.39 in). They are dark brown with some blue reflections dorsally and dark blue ventrally. They can be distinguished from all other species within the plebejum species group by having the smallest interstrial punctures. These punctures are nearly the same size as the interstrial shiny points. In all other species of the group, these shiny points are distinctly smaller than the interstrial punctures. Furthermore, the males possess a denticle on the mesofemur, a character shared with Deltochilum tyba, but the two species can be separated by the size of the interstrial punctures previously described.
