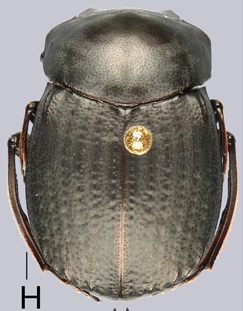

Scientific classification
- Kingdom: Animalia
- Phylum: Arthropoda
- Clade: Pancrustacea
- Class: Insecta
- Order: Coleoptera
- Suborder: Polyphaga
- Infraorder: Scarabaeiformia
- Family: Scarabaeidae
- Genus: Deltochilum
- Species: D. altiventris

Binomial name
- Deltochilum altiventris González-Alvarado & Neita, 2026

= Deltochilum altiventris =

Species of beetle

Deltochilum altiventris is a species of beetle of the family Scarabaeidae. It is found in Colombia (Cundinamarca, Arauca, Boyacá, Casanare, Meta), where it inhabits forests, sub-montane and montane forests, as well as primary and secondary forests.

== Description ==
Adults reach a length of about 10.3 mm (0.41 in). They are dark brown dorsally and dark greenish-blue ventrally. They can be distinguished from all other species within the plebejum species group by having incompletely closed punctures on the anterolateral areas of the metaventral process, in combination with the elevated first ventrite in males and the distribution (II–VII) of the tubercles on the elytral apex.

== Etymology ==
The species name refers is derived from Latin altus (meaning elevated) and ventris (meaning abdomen) and refers to the distinctly elevated first ventrite characteristic (although not exclusive) of this species.
