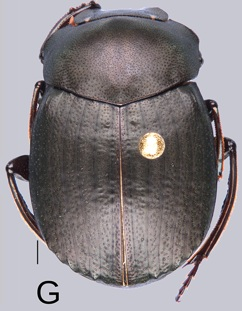

Scientific classification
- Kingdom: Animalia
- Phylum: Arthropoda
- Clade: Pancrustacea
- Class: Insecta
- Order: Coleoptera
- Suborder: Polyphaga
- Infraorder: Scarabaeiformia
- Family: Scarabaeidae
- Genus: Deltochilum
- Species: D. pauxi

Binomial name
- Deltochilum pauxi González-Alvarado & Neita, 2026

= Deltochilum pauxi =

Species of beetle

Deltochilum pauxi is a species of beetle of the family Scarabaeidae. It is found in Colombia (Santander).

== Description ==
Adults reach a length of about 11 mm (0.43 in). They are pale greenish-brown dorsally and dark greenish-blue ventrally. They can be distinguished from all other species within the plebejum species group by having the punctures on the anterolateral areas of the metaventral process incompletely closed, in combination with a salient medial angle on the pronotum (this angle is rounded in all other species). Deltochilum altiventris also exhibits these incompletely closed punctures, but it differs in several ways: the male first ventrite is elevated and the striae are narrow.

== Etymology ==
The species name refers to the type locality, RN Pauxi pauxi.
