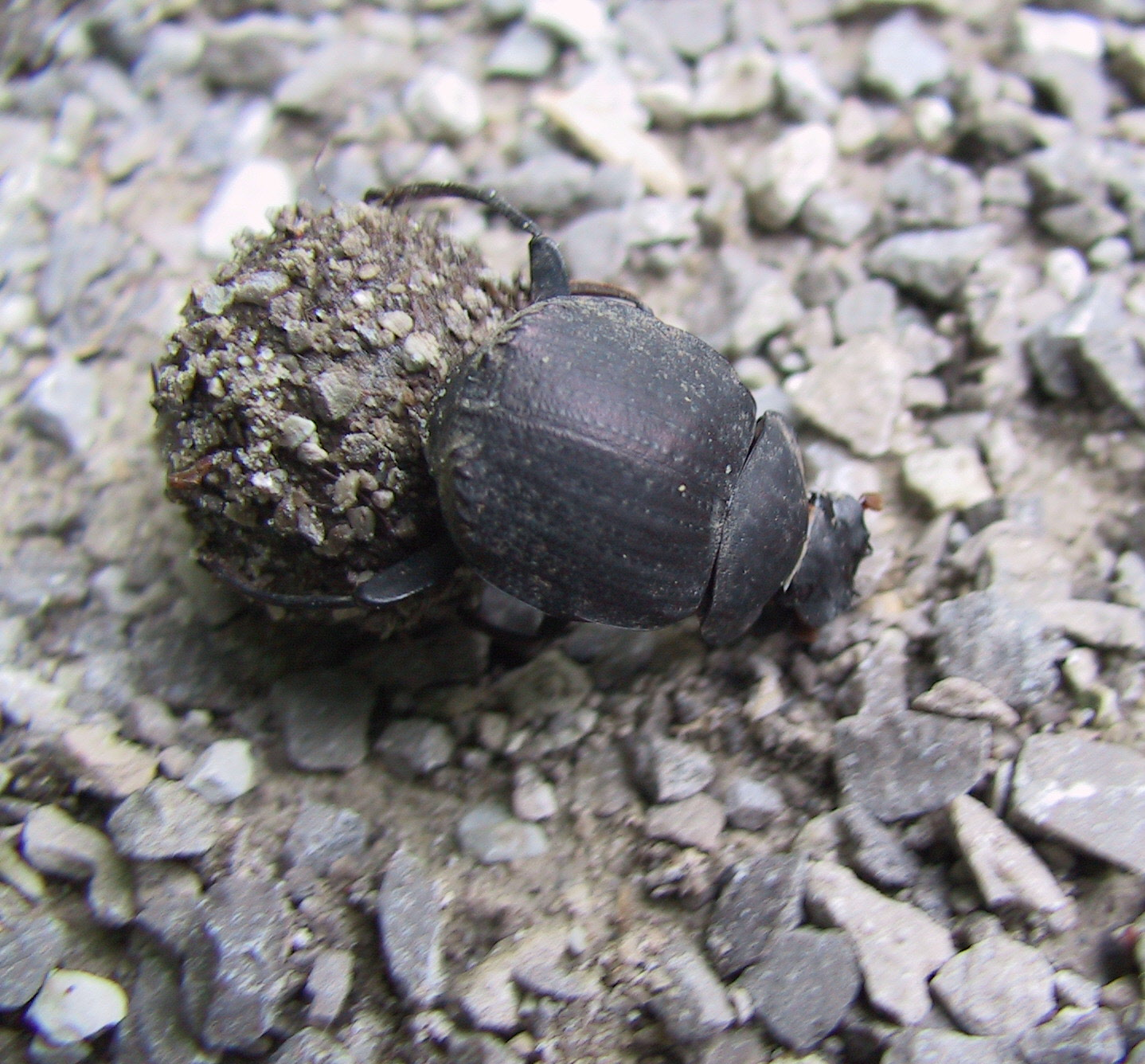
- Deltochilum gibbosum

Scientific classification
- Kingdom: Animalia
- Phylum: Arthropoda
- Clade: Pancrustacea
- Class: Insecta
- Order: Coleoptera
- Suborder: Polyphaga
- Infraorder: Scarabaeiformia
- Family: Scarabaeidae
- Subfamily: Scarabaeinae
- Tribe: Deltochilini
- Genus: Deltochilum; Eschscholtz, 1822

Diversity
- At least 100 species

Synonyms
- Aganhyboma; Anamnesis Vigors, 1826; Calhyboma; Deltohyboma; Euhyboma; Hyboma LePeletier and Serville, 1828; Meghyboma Kolbe, 1893

= Deltochilum =

Genus of beetles

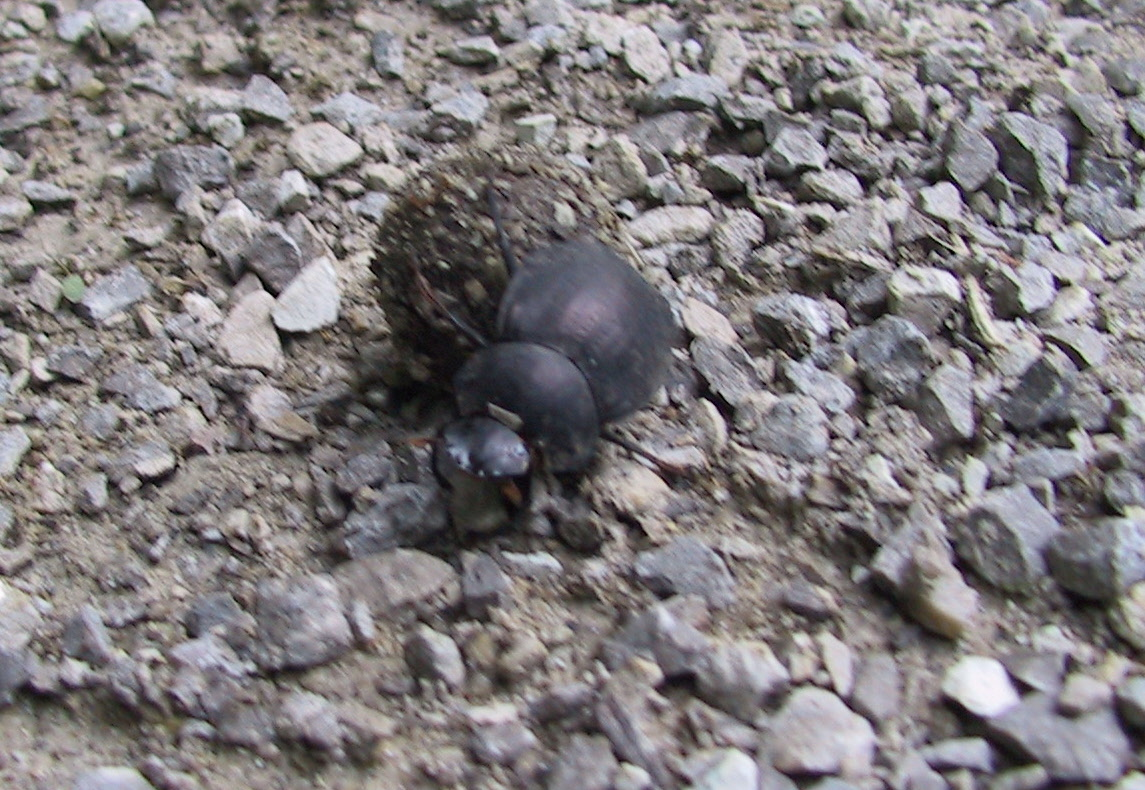
Deltochilum gibbosum

Deltochilum is a genus of true dung beetles in the family Scarabaeidae native to the Americas. There are more than 100 described species in Deltochilum. Unusually for a dung beetle, a few species in the genus, including D. valgum, are predators that kill and feed on millipedes.

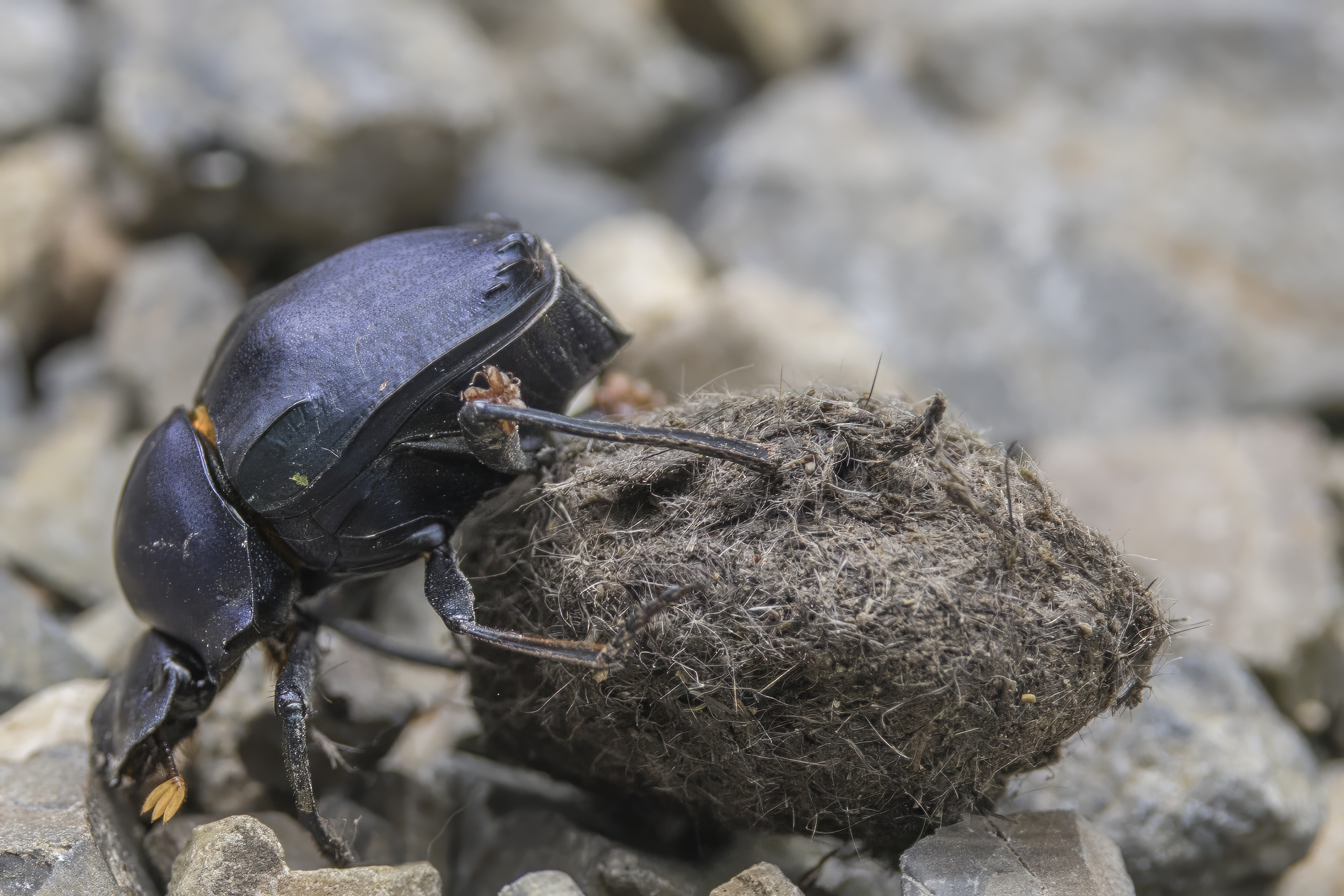
D. mexicanum

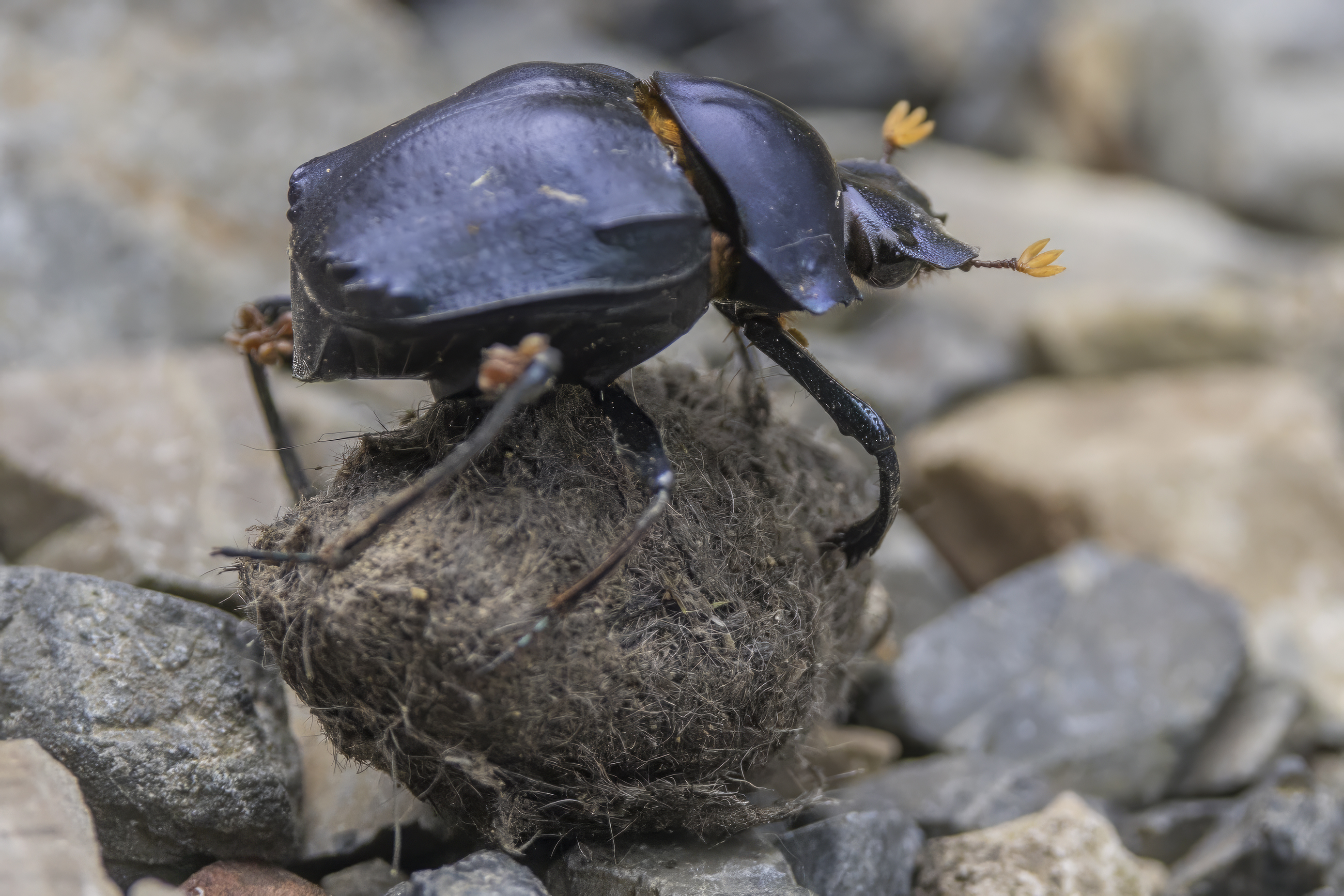
showing navigation technique

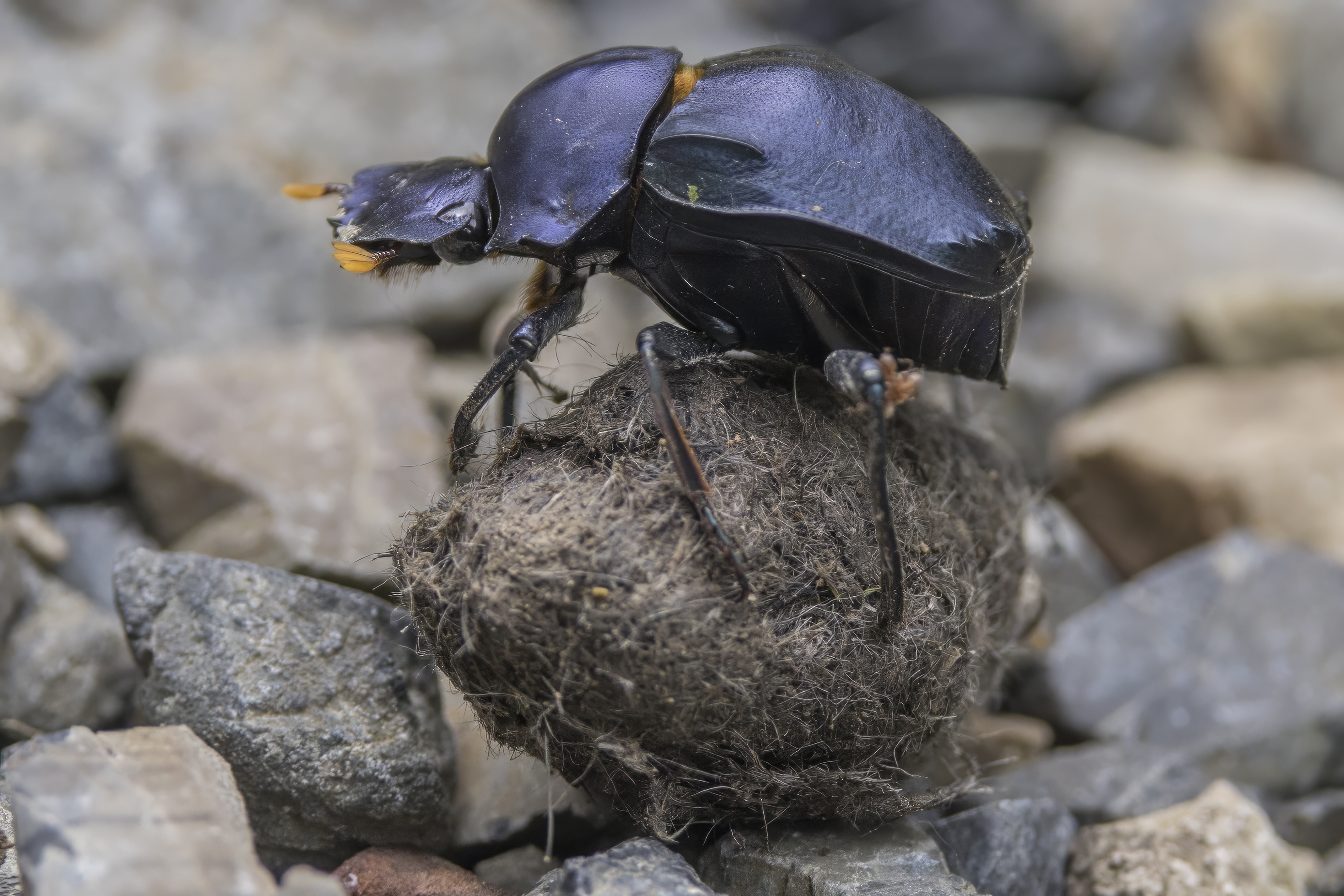
in Colombia

== See also ==
- List of Deltochilum species
