= Griseargiolestes intermedius =

Alpine flatwing

Conservation status
- Least Concern (IUCN 3.1)

Scientific classification
- Kingdom: Animalia
- Phylum: Arthropoda
- Clade: Pancrustacea
- Class: Insecta
- Order: Odonata
- Suborder: Zygoptera
- Family: Argiolestidae
- Genus: Griseargiolestes
- Species: G. intermedius

Binomial name
- Griseargiolestes intermedius (Tillyard, 1913)

Synonyms
- Argiolestes griseus intermedius Tillyard, 1913

Species of damselfly

Griseargiolestes intermedius is a species of Australian damselfly in the family Argiolestidae, commonly known as an alpine flatwing. It is endemic to alpine areas of Victoria and New South Wales, where it inhabits bogs and seepages.

Griseargiolestes intermedius is a medium-sized damselfly, black-green metallic in colour with pale markings; adults are slightly pruinescent. Like other members of the family Argiolestidae, it rests with its wings outspread.

Griseargiolestes intermedius appears similar to Griseargiolestes griseus, which occurs further north into New South Wales.

== Etymology ==
The genus name Griseargiolestes combines the Latin griseus ("grey" or "pearl-grey") with Argiolestes, the name of a related genus. It refers to the pale pruinescence seen in this group.

The species name intermedius is Latin for "intermediate". In 1913, Robin Tillyard applied the name intermedius to this form, referring to its intermediate appearance between typical specimens of Argiolestes griseus and the distinct form eboracus.

== Gallery ==
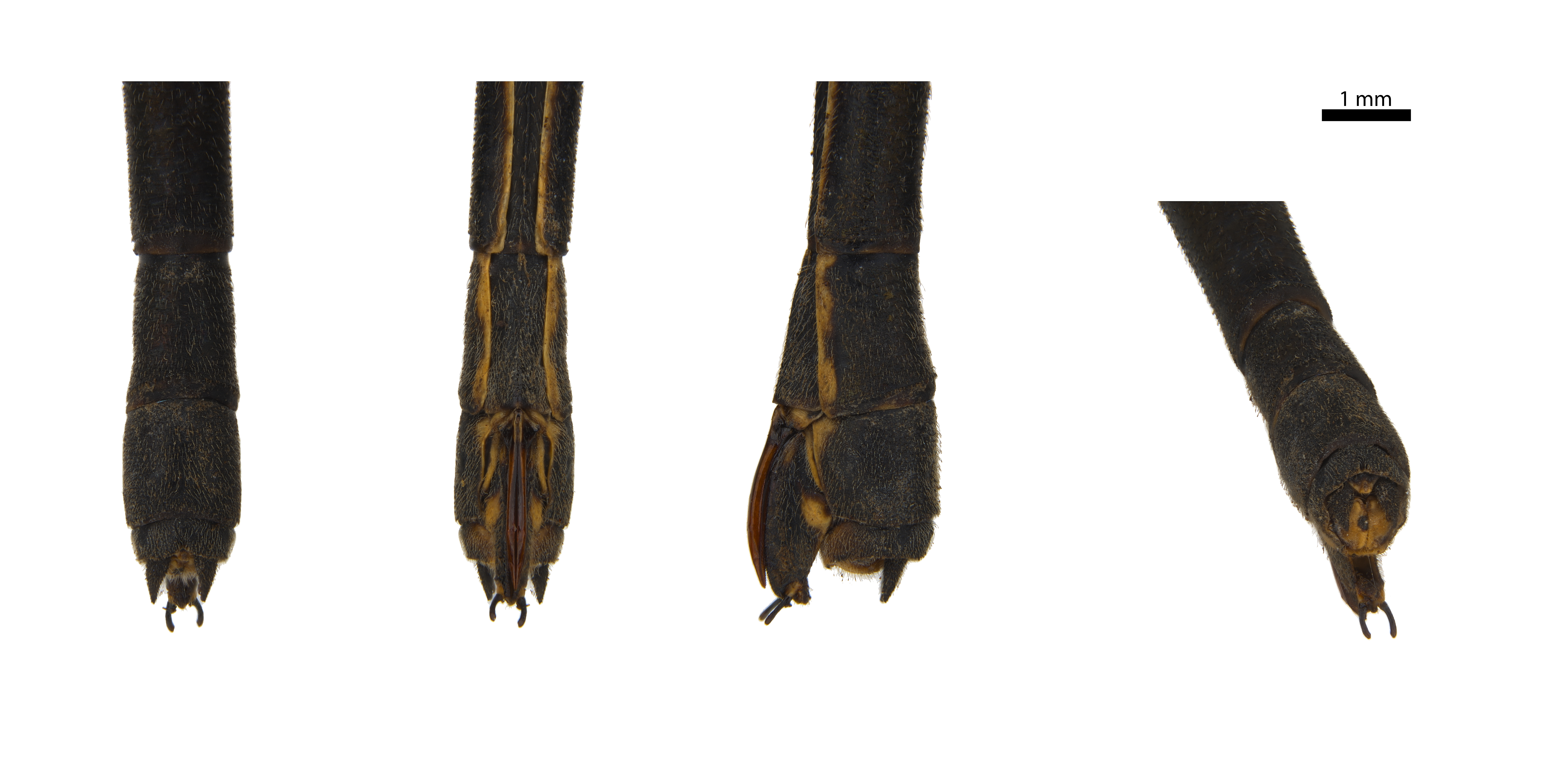
Tip of female tail

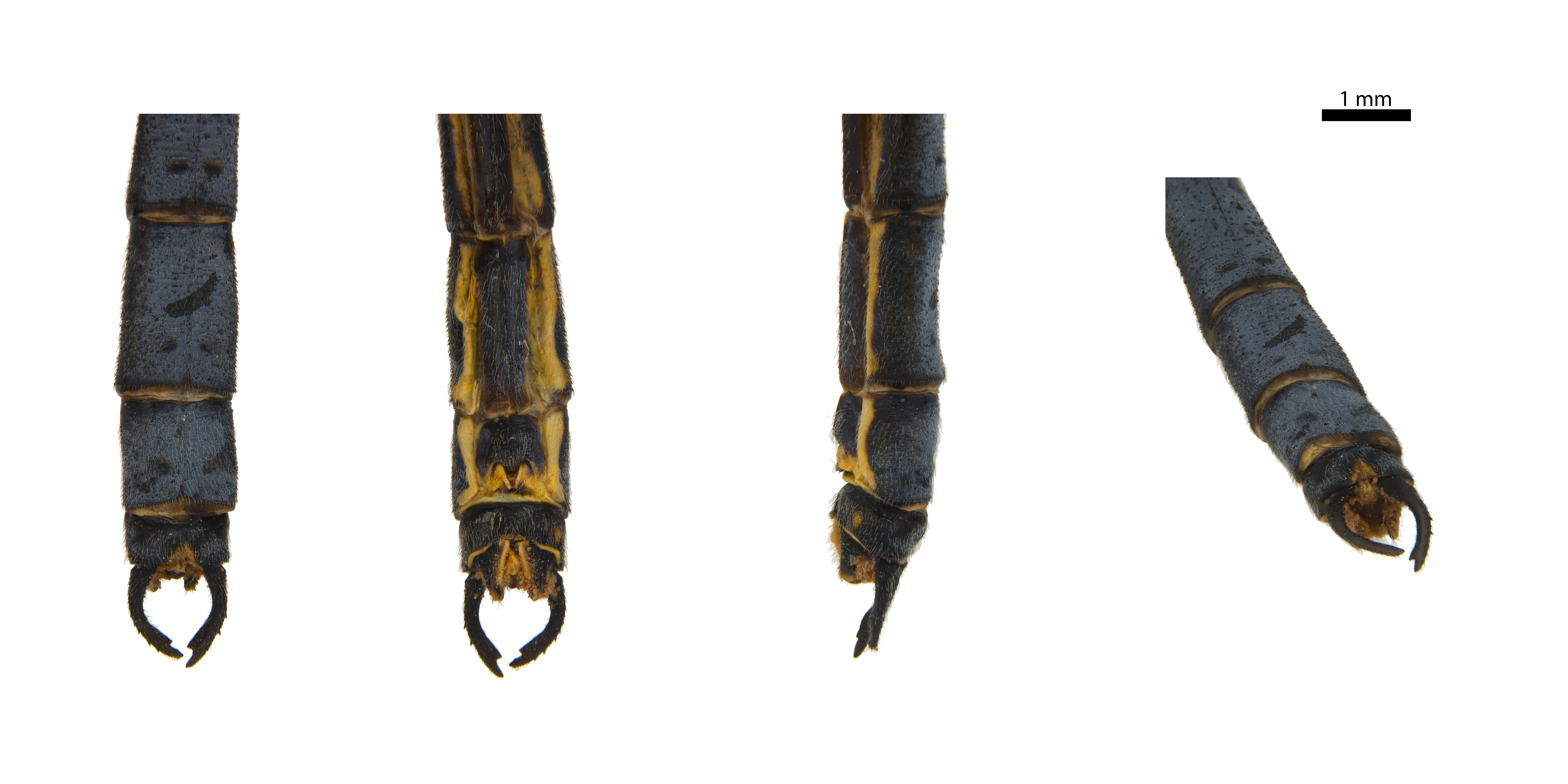
Tip of male tail

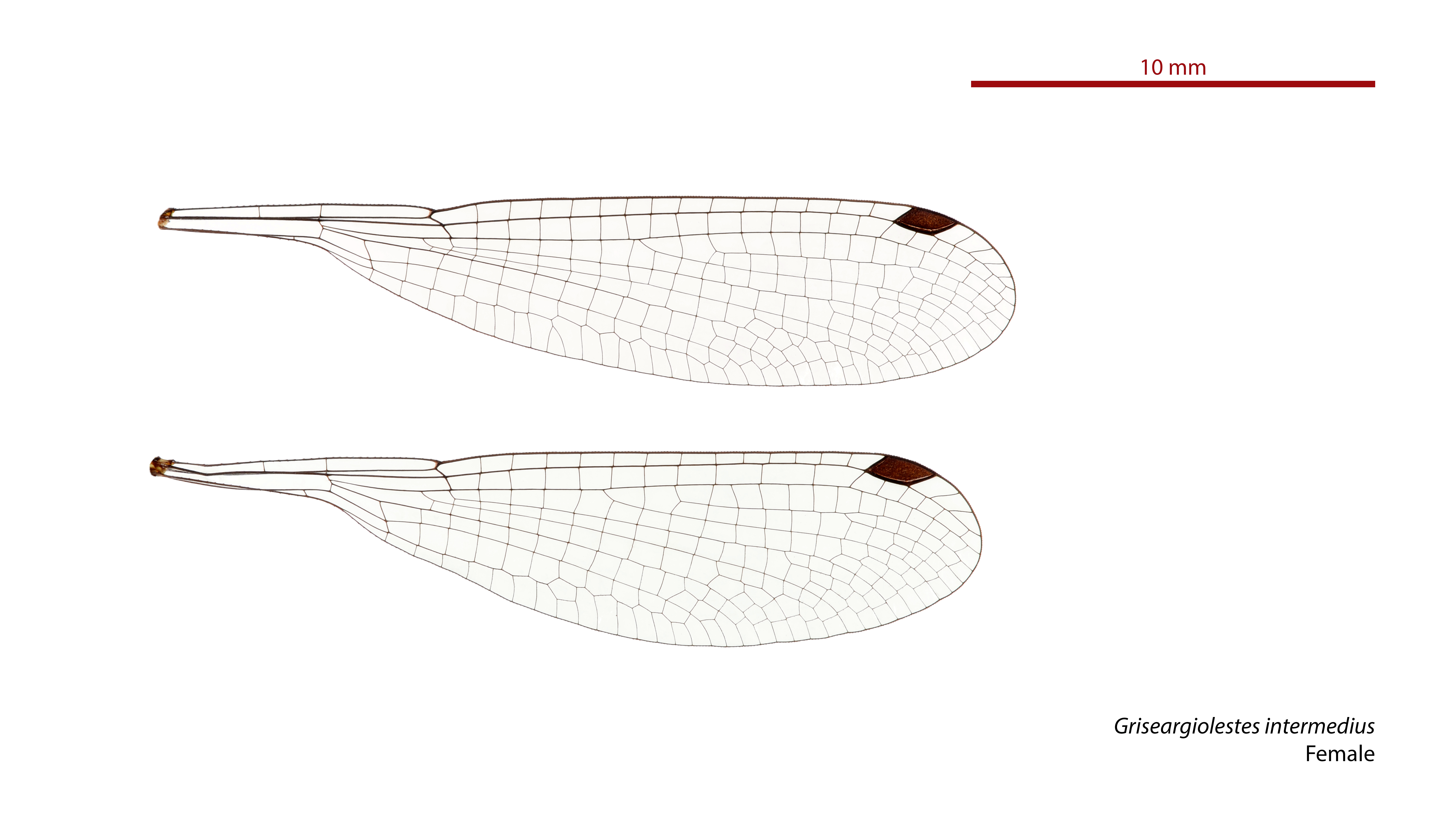
Female wings

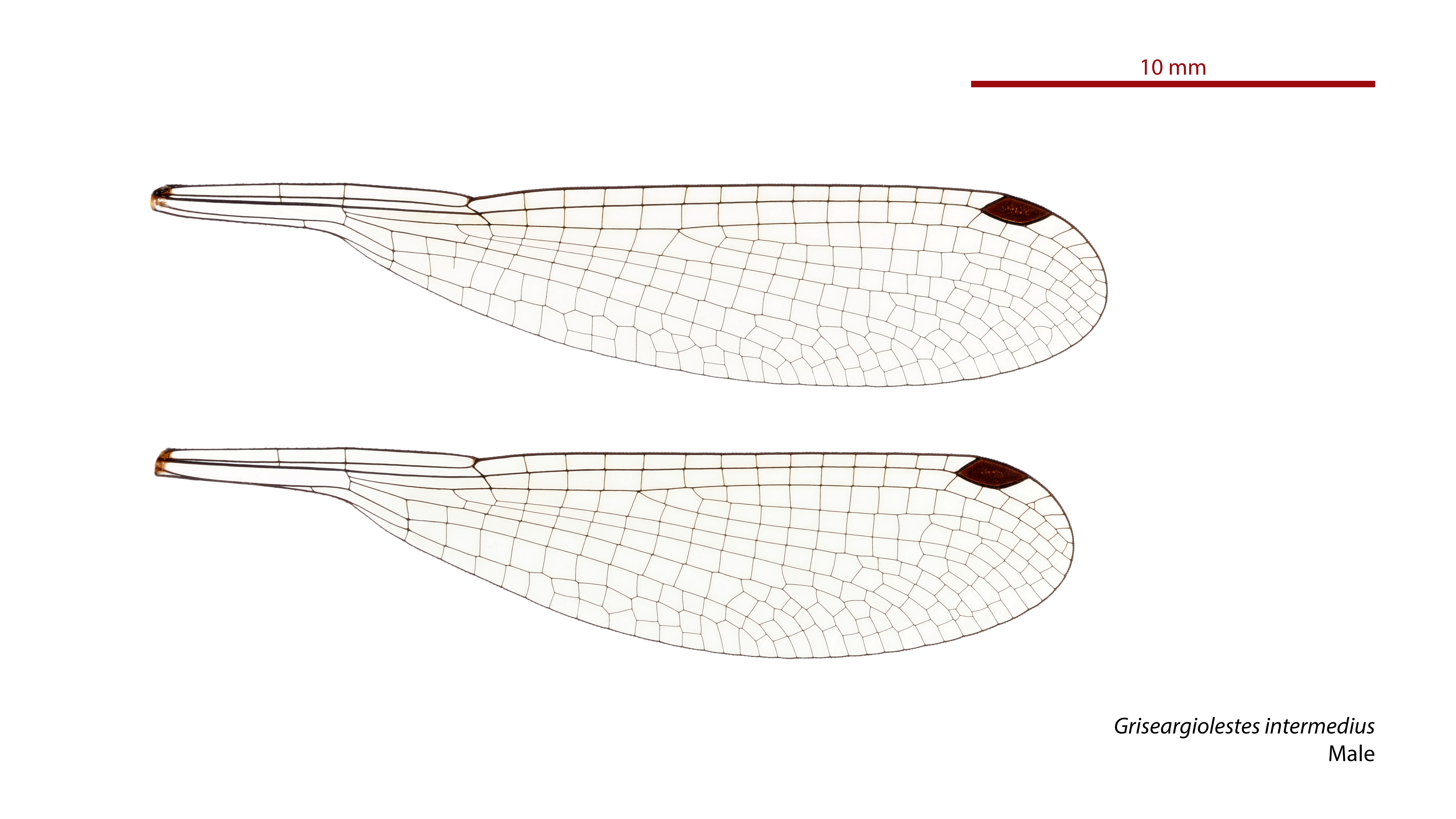
Male wings

== See also ==
- List of Odonata species of Australia
