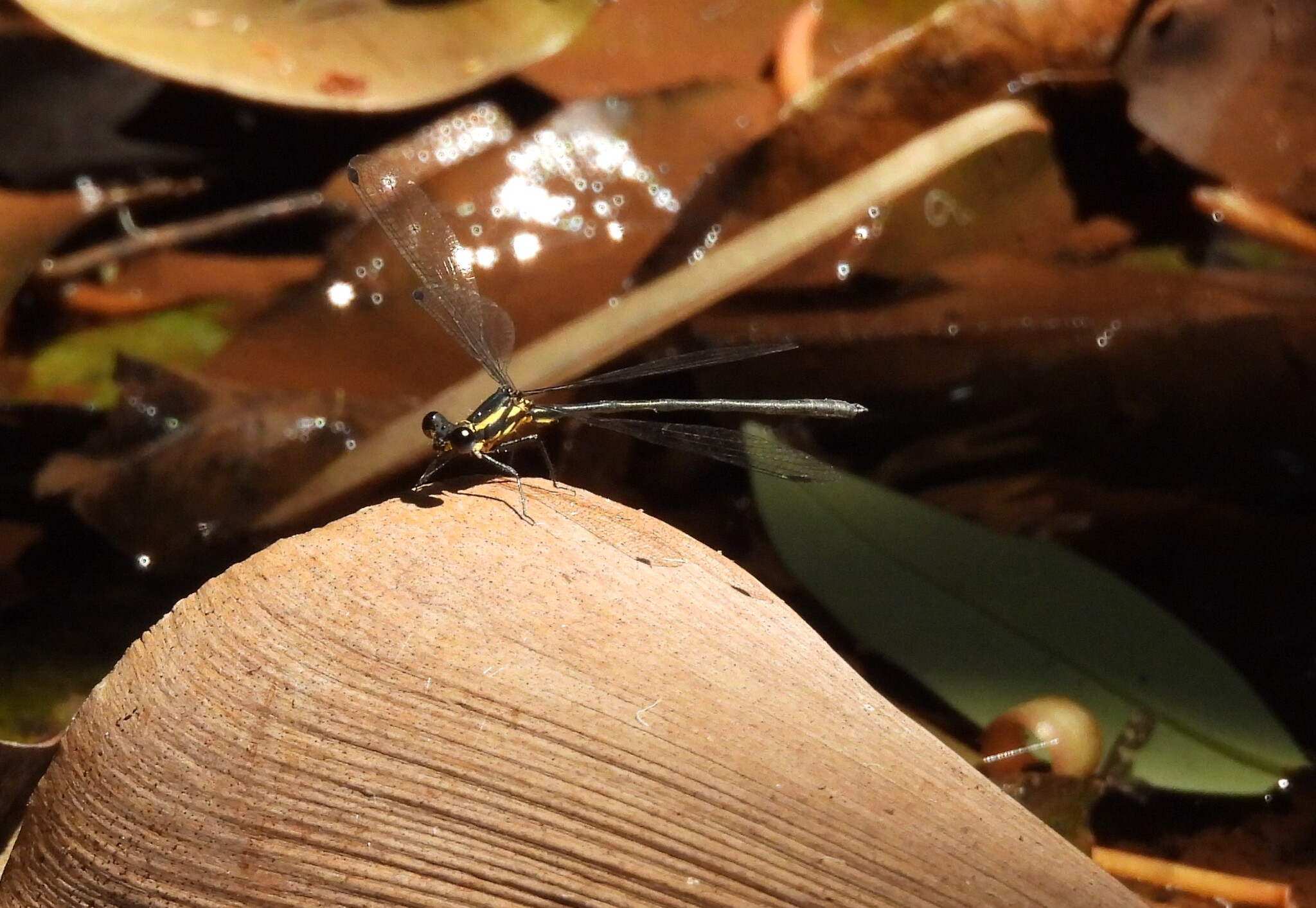
- Male

Conservation status
- Least Concern (IUCN 3.1)

Scientific classification
- Kingdom: Animalia
- Phylum: Arthropoda
- Clade: Pancrustacea
- Class: Insecta
- Order: Odonata
- Suborder: Zygoptera
- Family: Argiolestidae
- Genus: Griseargiolestes
- Species: G. fontanus

Binomial name
- Griseargiolestes fontanus (Tillyard, 1913)

Synonyms
- Argiolestes fontanus Tillyard, 1913

= Griseargiolestes fontanus =

Springs flatwing

Species of damselfly

Griseargiolestes fontanus is a species of Australian damselfly in the family Argiolestidae, commonly known as a springs flatwing. It is endemic to south-eastern Queensland and north-eastern New South Wales, where it inhabits streams near their springs.

Griseargiolestes fontanus is a medium-sized damselfly, black-green metallic in colour with pale markings; adults have only a slight pruinescence. Like other members of the family Argiolestidae, it rests with its wings outspread.

Griseargiolestes fontanus appears similar to Griseargiolestes albescens, though with less pruinescence.

== Etymology ==
The genus name Griseargiolestes combines the Latin griseus ("grey" or "pearl-grey") with Argiolestes, the name of a related genus. It refers to the pale pruinescence seen in this group.

The species name fontanus is Latin for "of a spring or fountain", referring to the waterfall near where the species was first recorded.

== Gallery ==
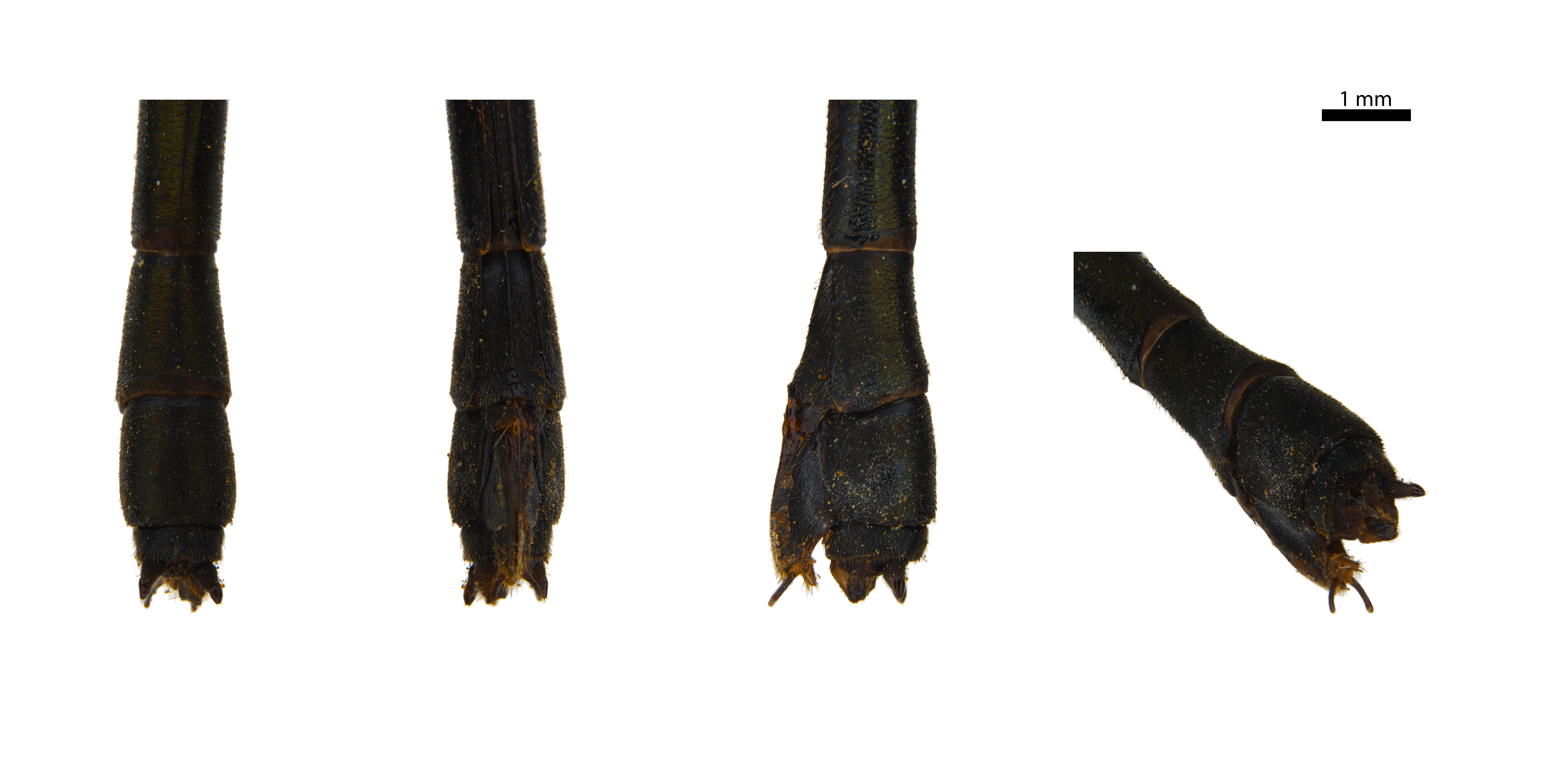
Tip of female tail

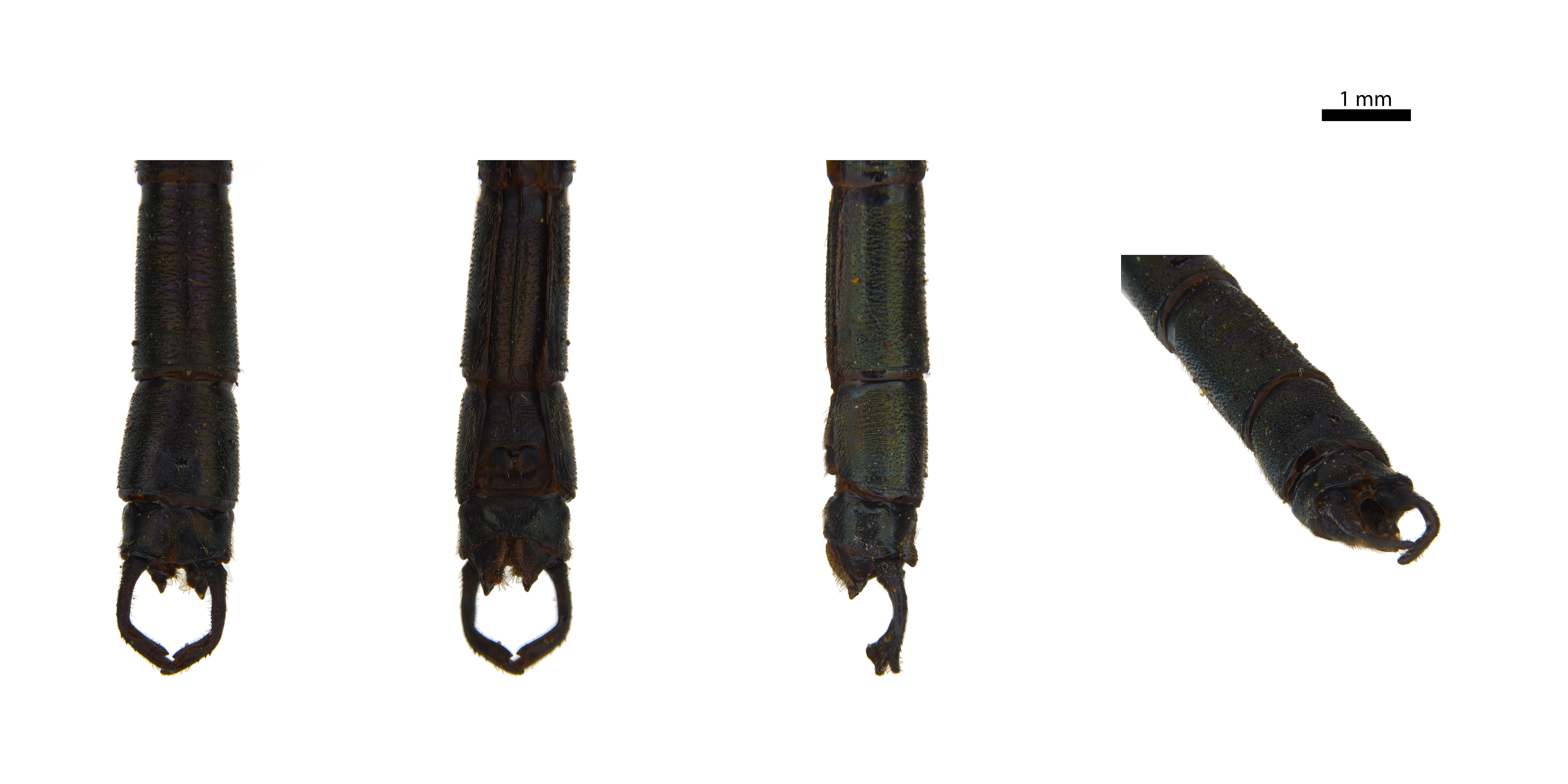
Tip of male tail

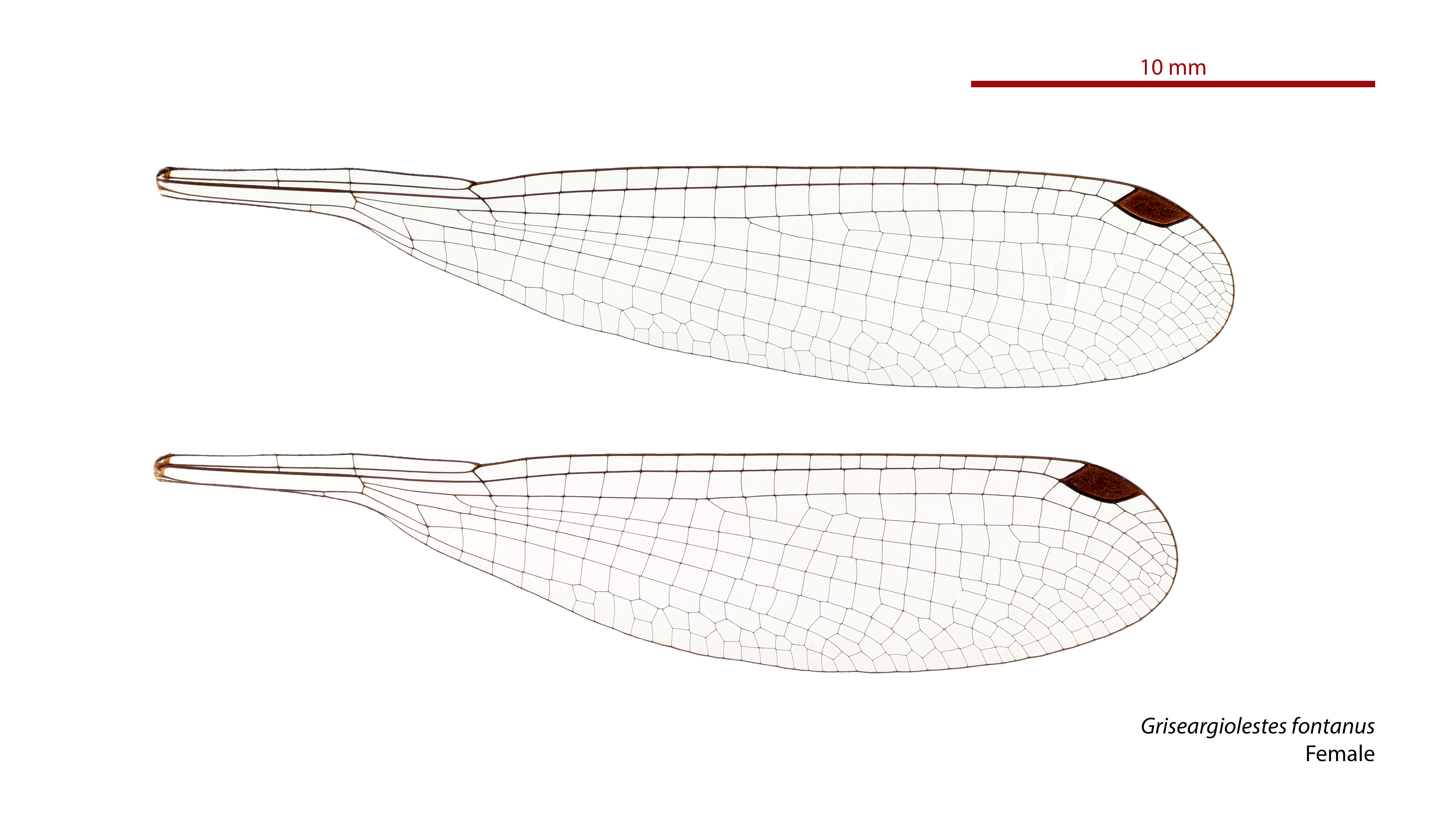
Female wings

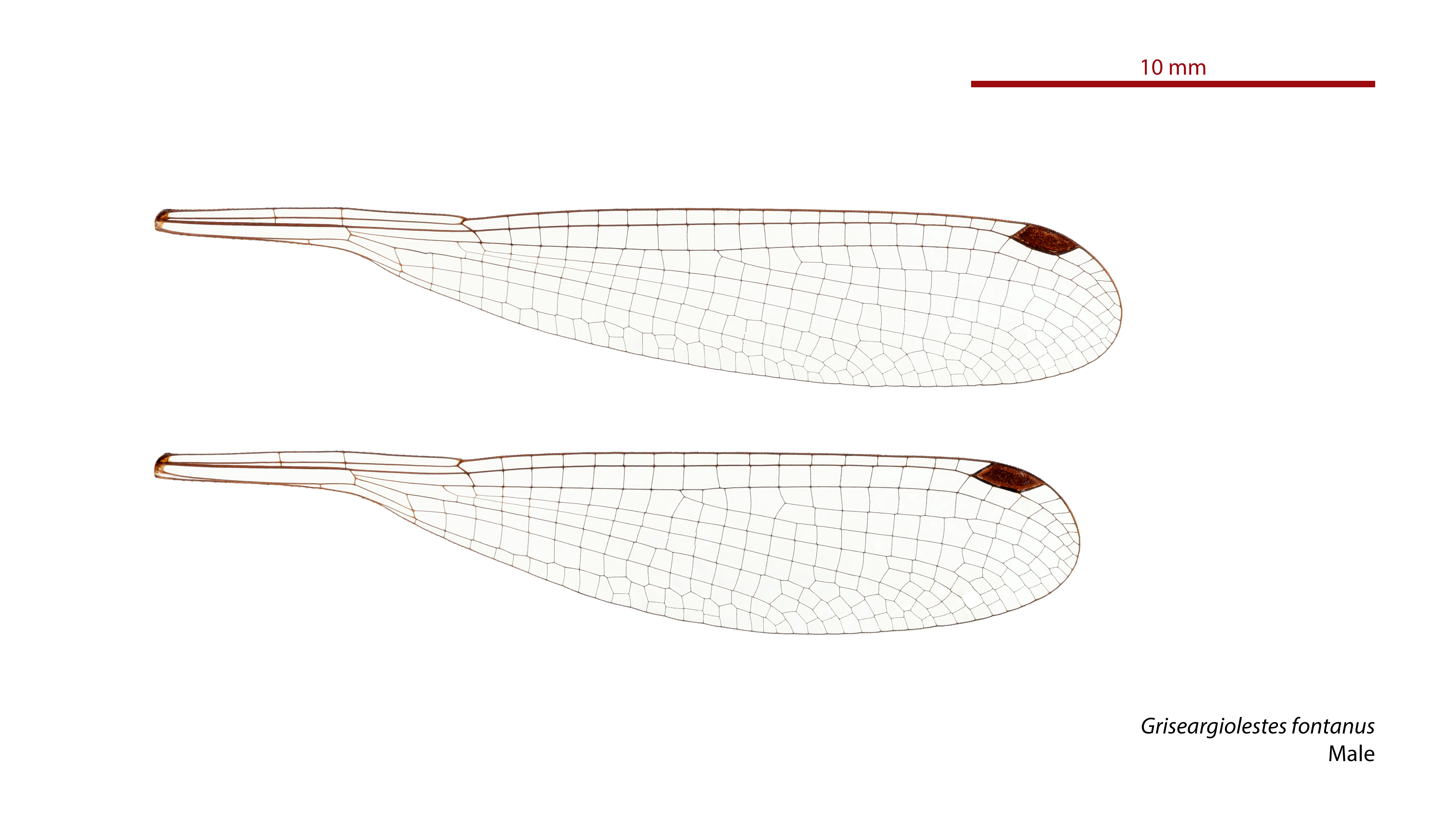
Male wings

== See also ==
- List of Odonata species of Australia
