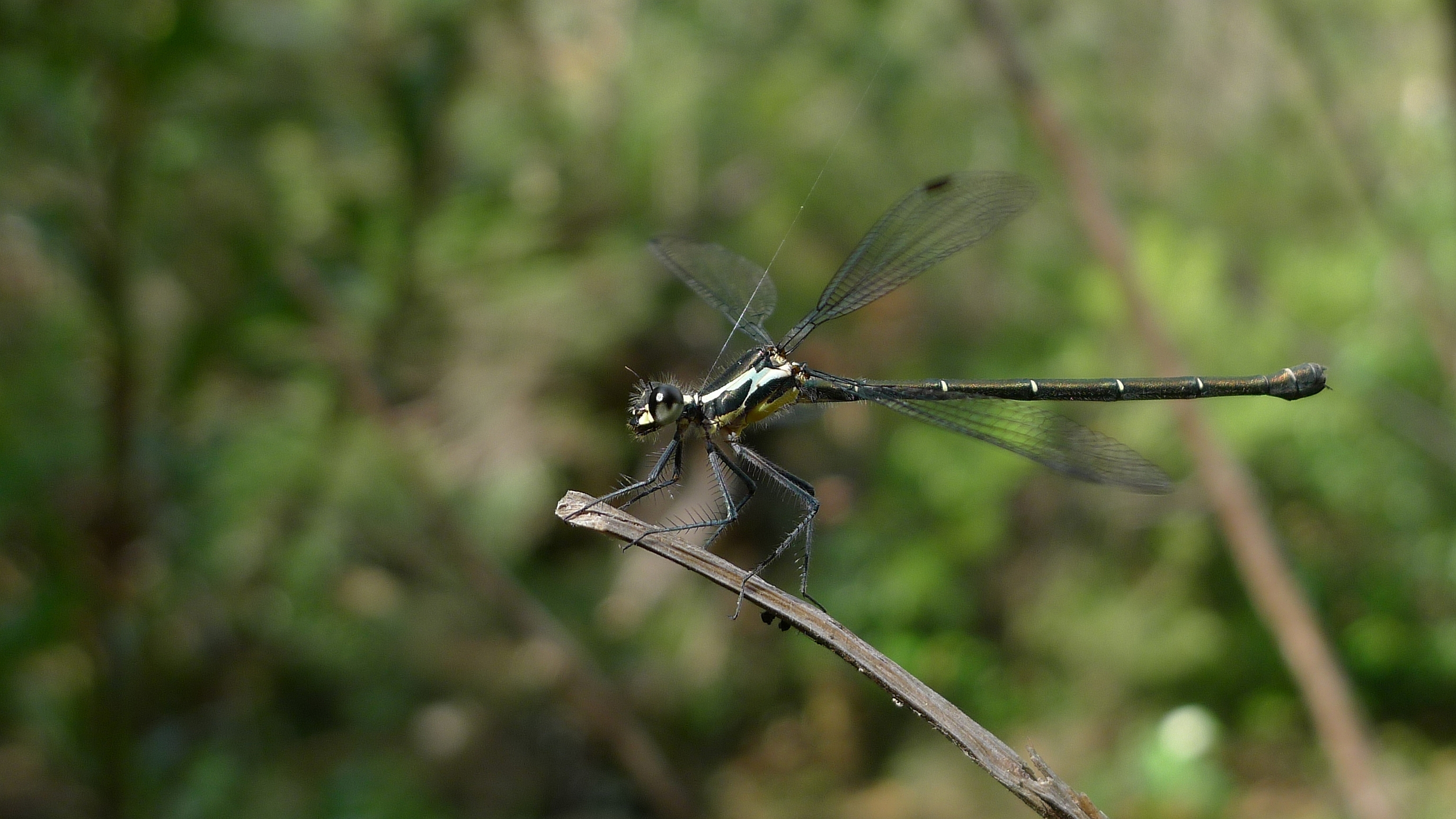
- Griseargiolestes eboracus, Sydney

Scientific classification
- Kingdom: Animalia
- Phylum: Arthropoda
- Clade: Pancrustacea
- Class: Insecta
- Order: Odonata
- Suborder: Zygoptera
- Family: Argiolestidae
- Genus: Griseargiolestes; Theischinger, 1998

= Griseargiolestes =

Genus of damselflies

Griseargiolestes is a genus of damselflies in the family Argiolestidae. They are medium-sized, black and green metallic damselflies with pale markings, endemic to eastern Australia.

== Species ==
The genus Griseargiolestes includes the following species:

- Griseargiolestes albescens (Tillyard, 1913) - coastal flatwing
- Griseargiolestes bucki Theischinger, 1998 - turquoise flatwing
- Griseargiolestes eboracus (Tillyard, 1913) - grey-chested flatwing
- Griseargiolestes fontanus (Tillyard, 1913) - springs flatwing
- Griseargiolestes griseus (Hagen, 1862) - grey flatwing
- Griseargiolestes intermedius (Tillyard, 1913) - alpine flatwing
- Griseargiolestes metallicus (Sjöstedt, 1917) - metallic flatwing

== Etymology ==
The genus name Griseargiolestes combines the Latin griseus ("grey" or "pearl-grey") with Argiolestes, the name of a related genus. It refers to the pale pruinescence seen in this group.

== See also ==
- List of Odonata species of Australia
