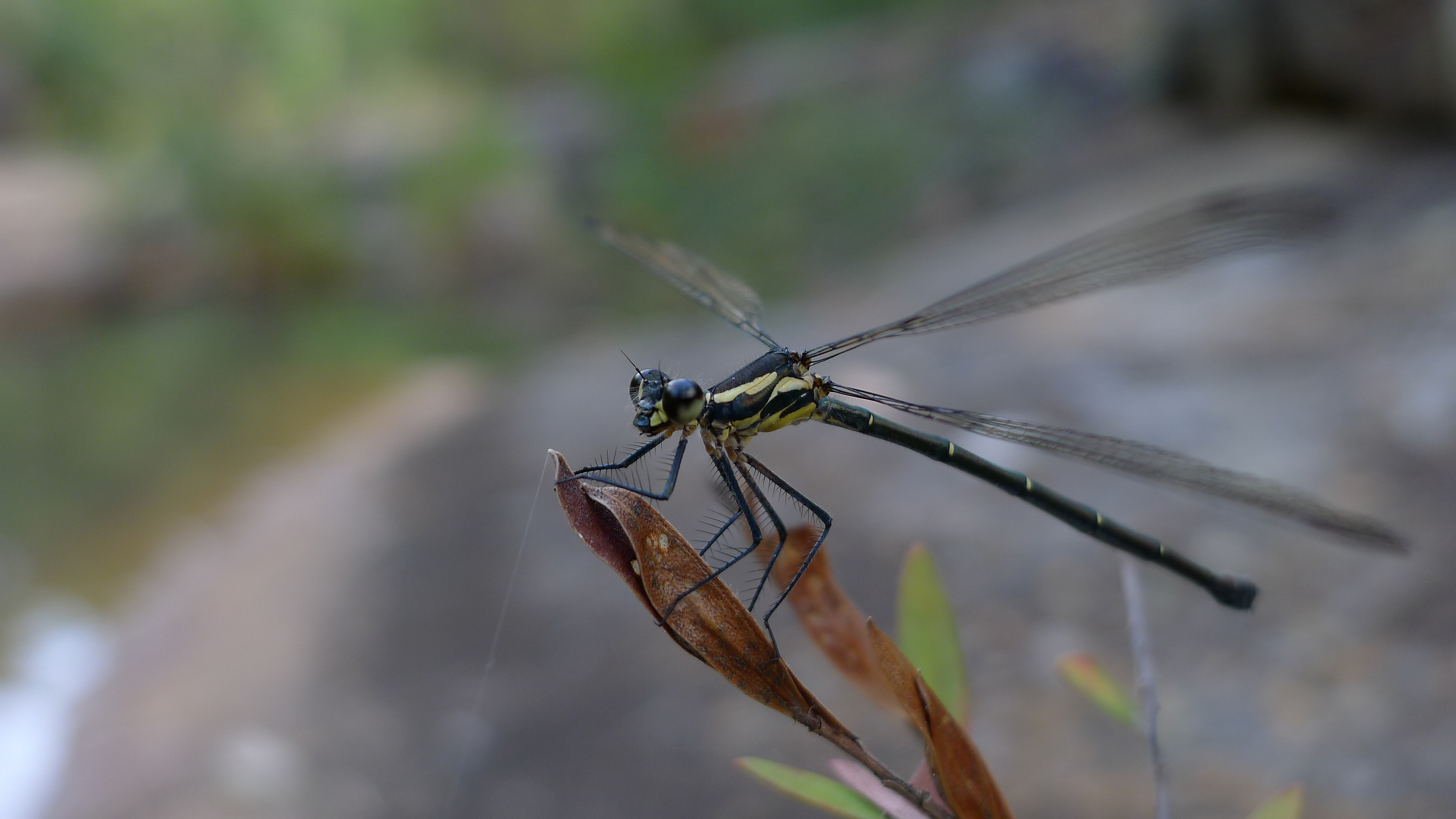
- Female Griseargiolestes eboracus

Conservation status
- Least Concern (IUCN 3.1)

Scientific classification
- Kingdom: Animalia
- Phylum: Arthropoda
- Clade: Pancrustacea
- Class: Insecta
- Order: Odonata
- Suborder: Zygoptera
- Family: Argiolestidae
- Genus: Griseargiolestes
- Species: G. eboracus

Binomial name
- Griseargiolestes eboracus (Tillyard, 1913)

Synonyms
- Argiolestes griseus eboracus Tillyard, 1913

= Griseargiolestes eboracus =

Grey-chested flatwing

Species of damselfly

Griseargiolestes eboracus is a species of Australian damselfly in the family Argiolestidae, commonly known as a grey-chested flatwing. It is endemic to eastern Australia, where it inhabits bogs.

Griseargiolestes eboracus is a medium-sized damselfly, black-green metallic in colour with yellow markings; adults have pruinescence on the body, but not the tail. Like other members of the family Argiolestidae, it rests with its wings outspread.

Griseargiolestes eboracus appears similar to Griseargiolestes griseus which is found south of the Hunter River in New South Wales.

== Etymology ==
The genus name Griseargiolestes combines the Latin griseus ("grey" or "pearl-grey") with Argiolestes, the name of a related genus. It refers to the pale pruinescence seen in this group.

The species name eboracus is derived from Ebor, New South Wales, where the species was first recorded, and the Greek suffix -ακός (-akos, "belonging to").

== Gallery ==
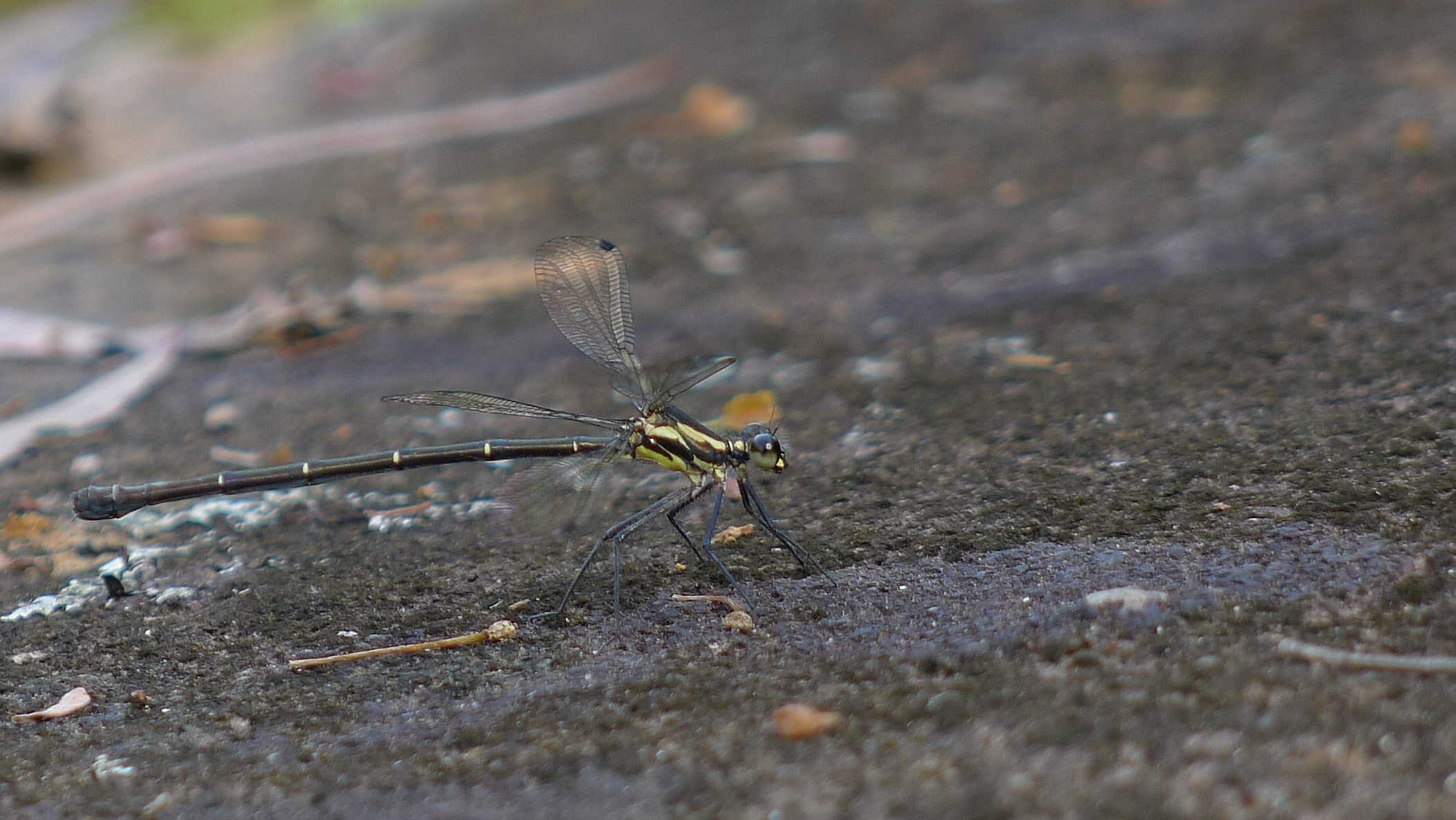
Female

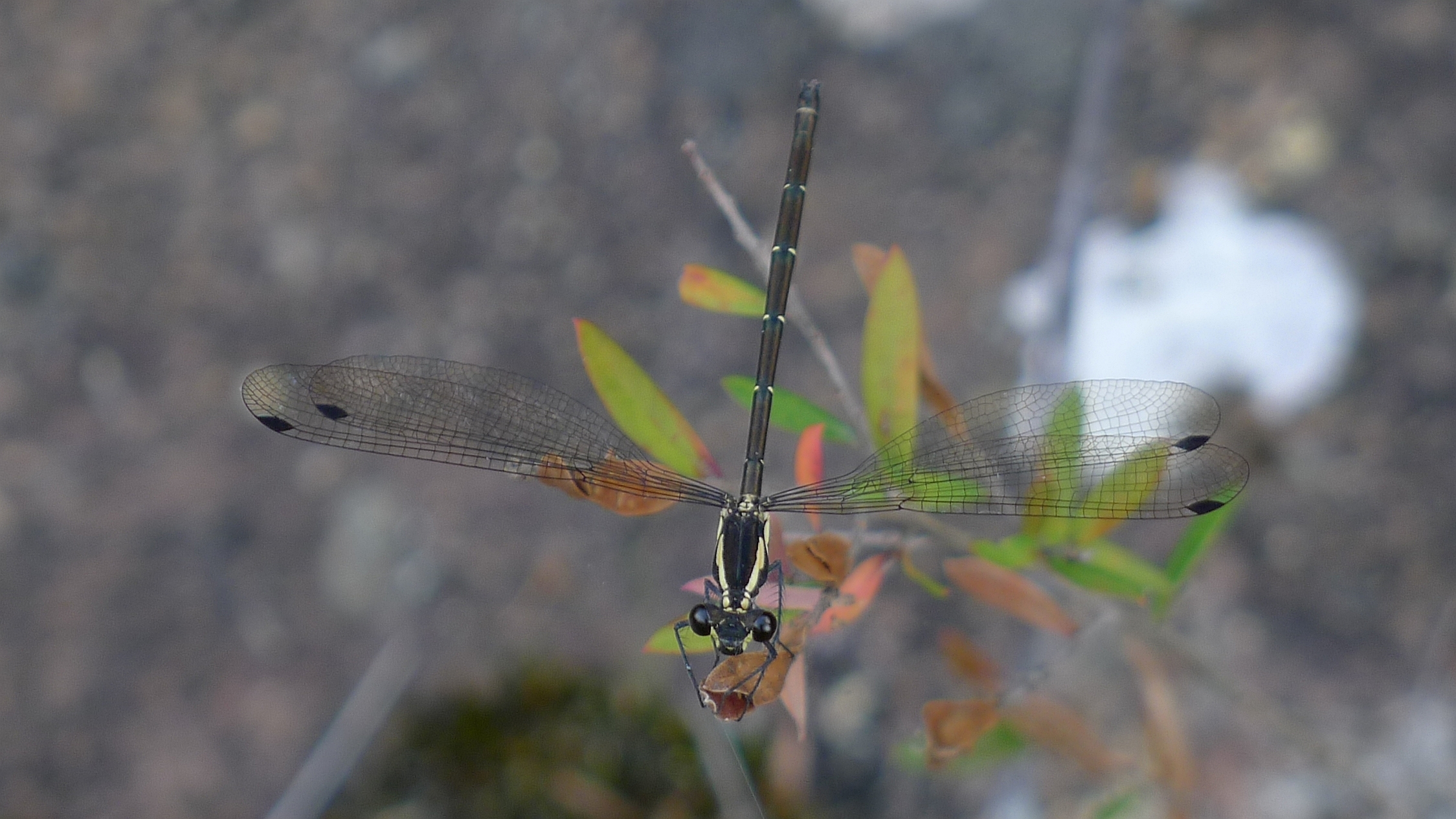
Female from above

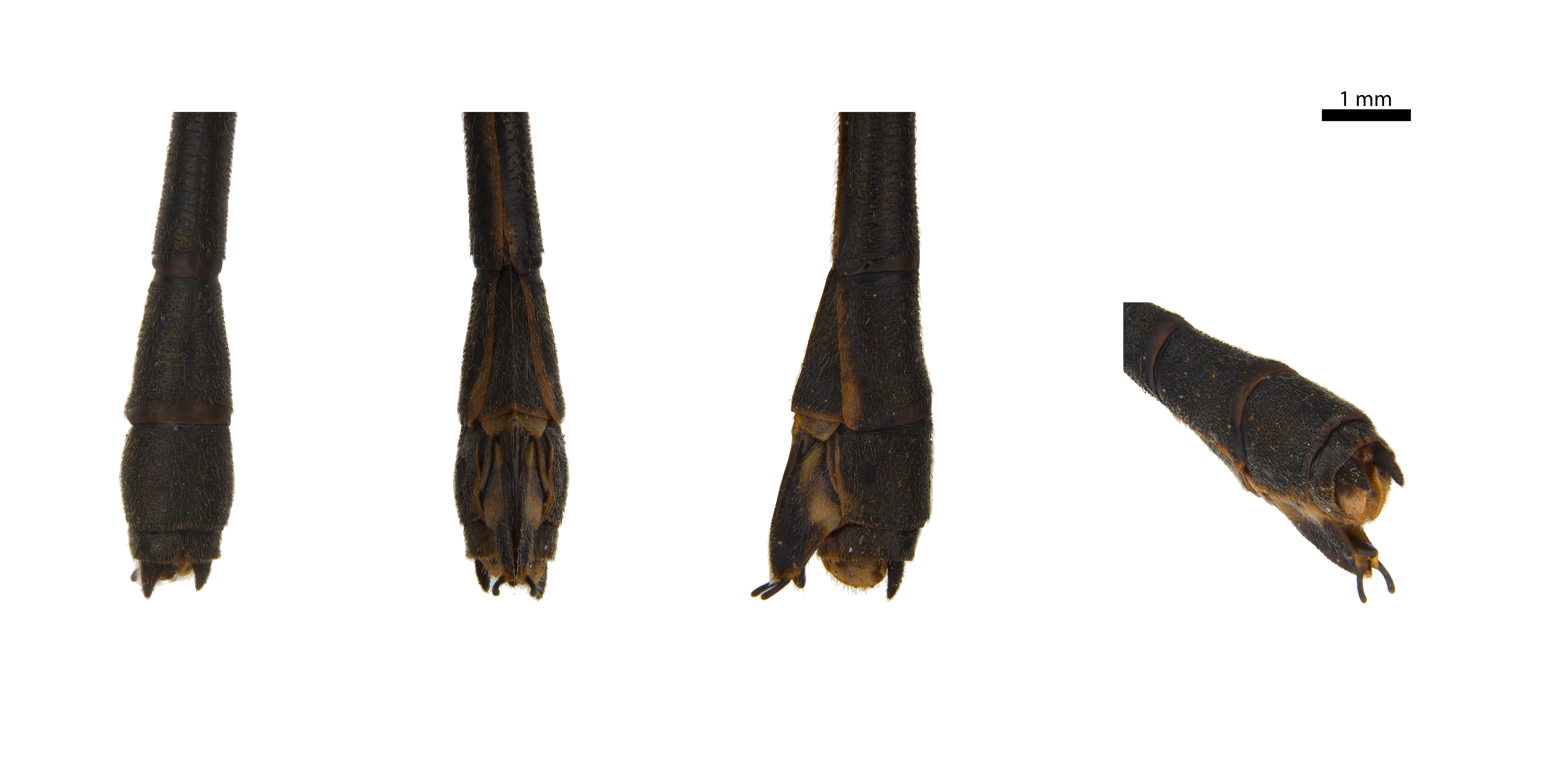
Tip of female tail

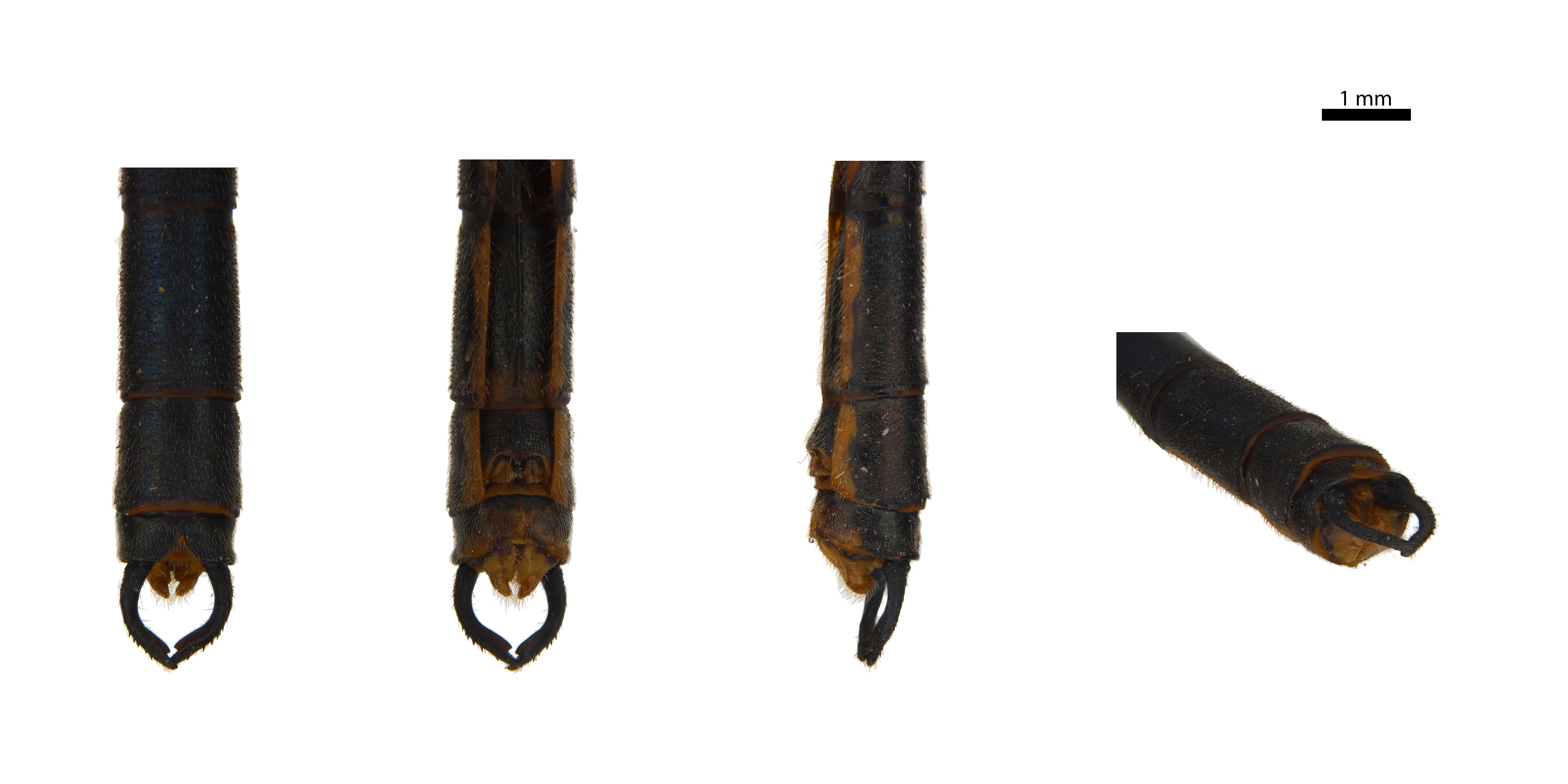
Tip of male tail

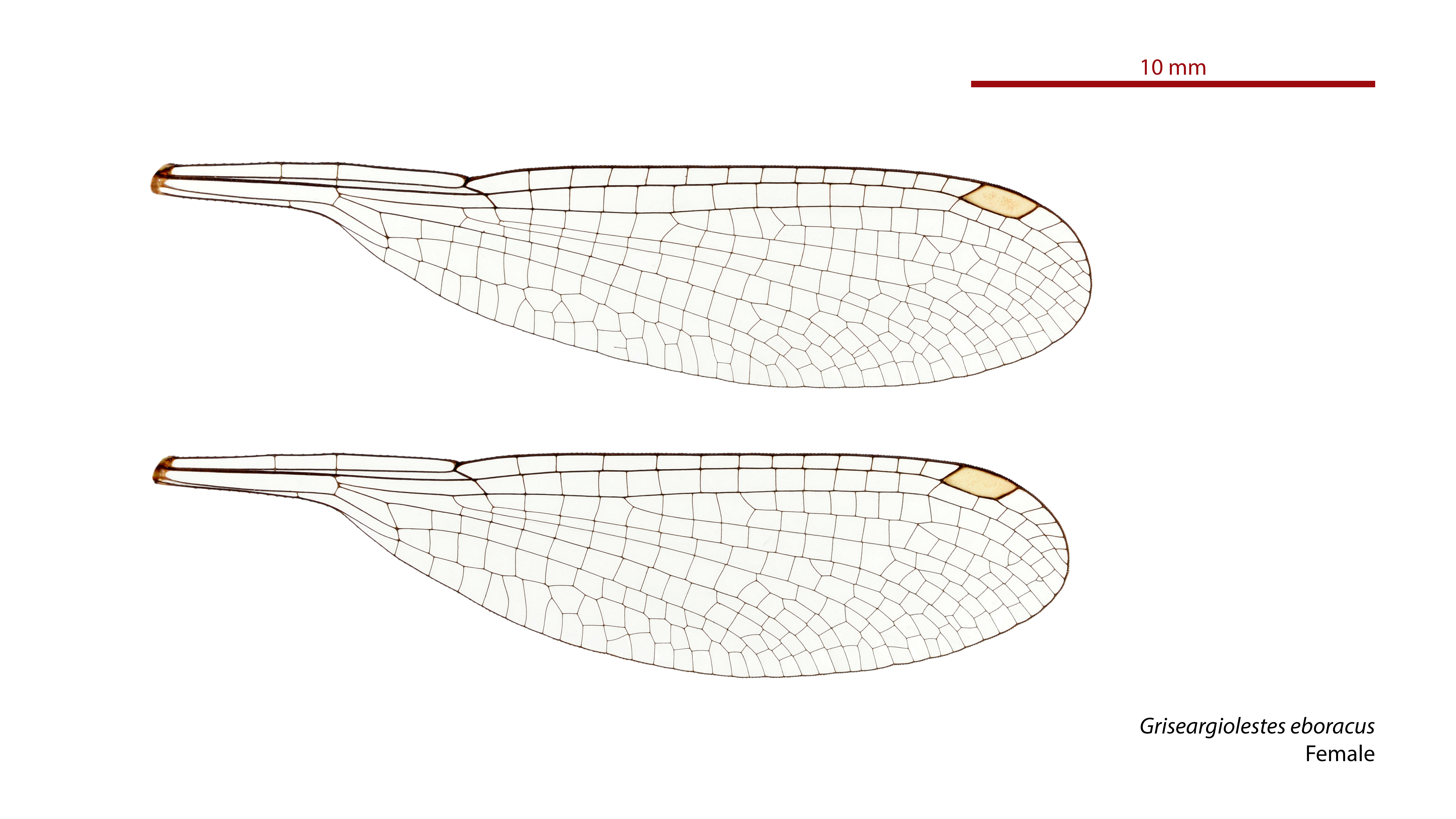
Female wings

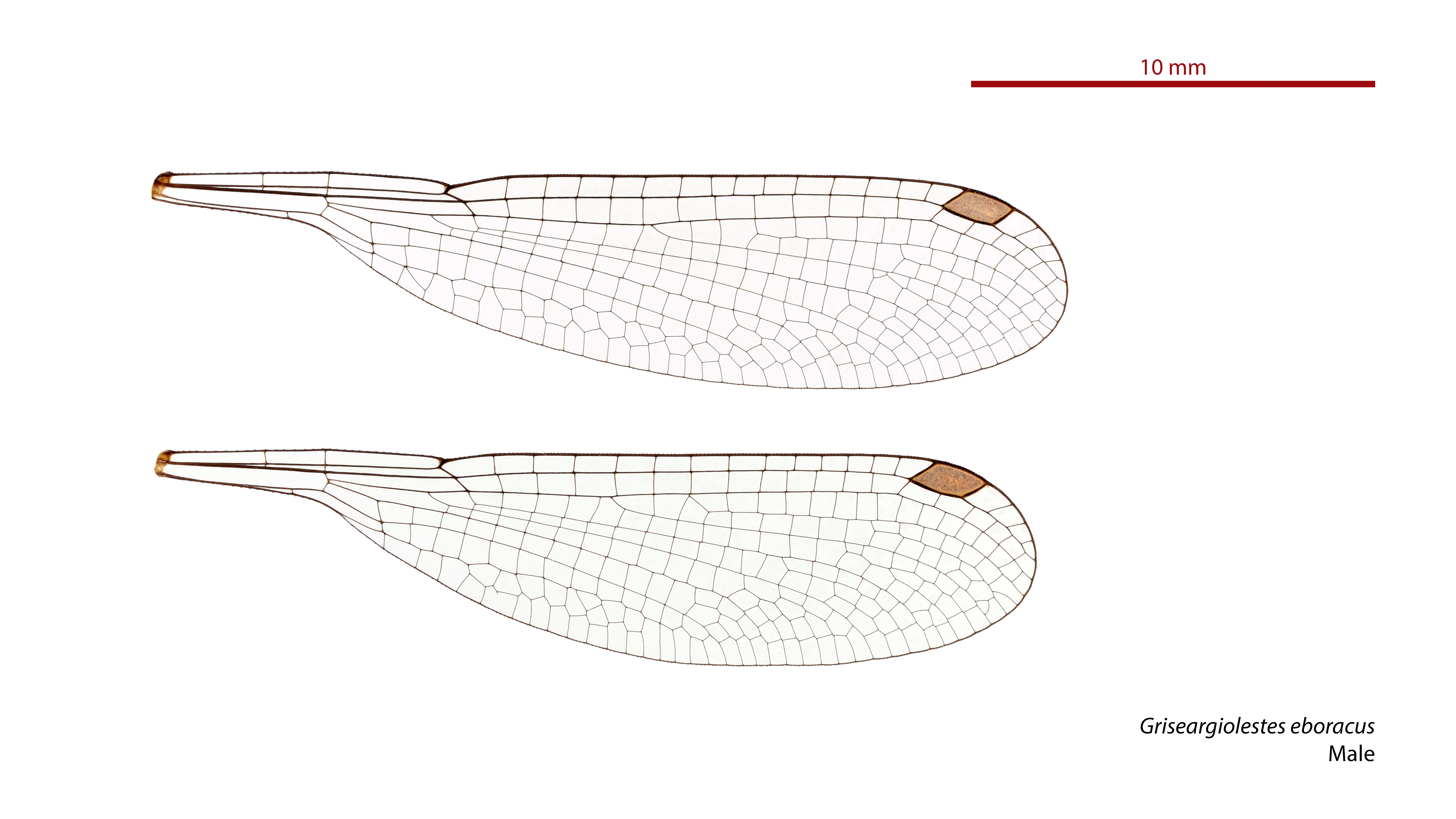
Male wings

== See also ==
- List of Odonata species of Australia
