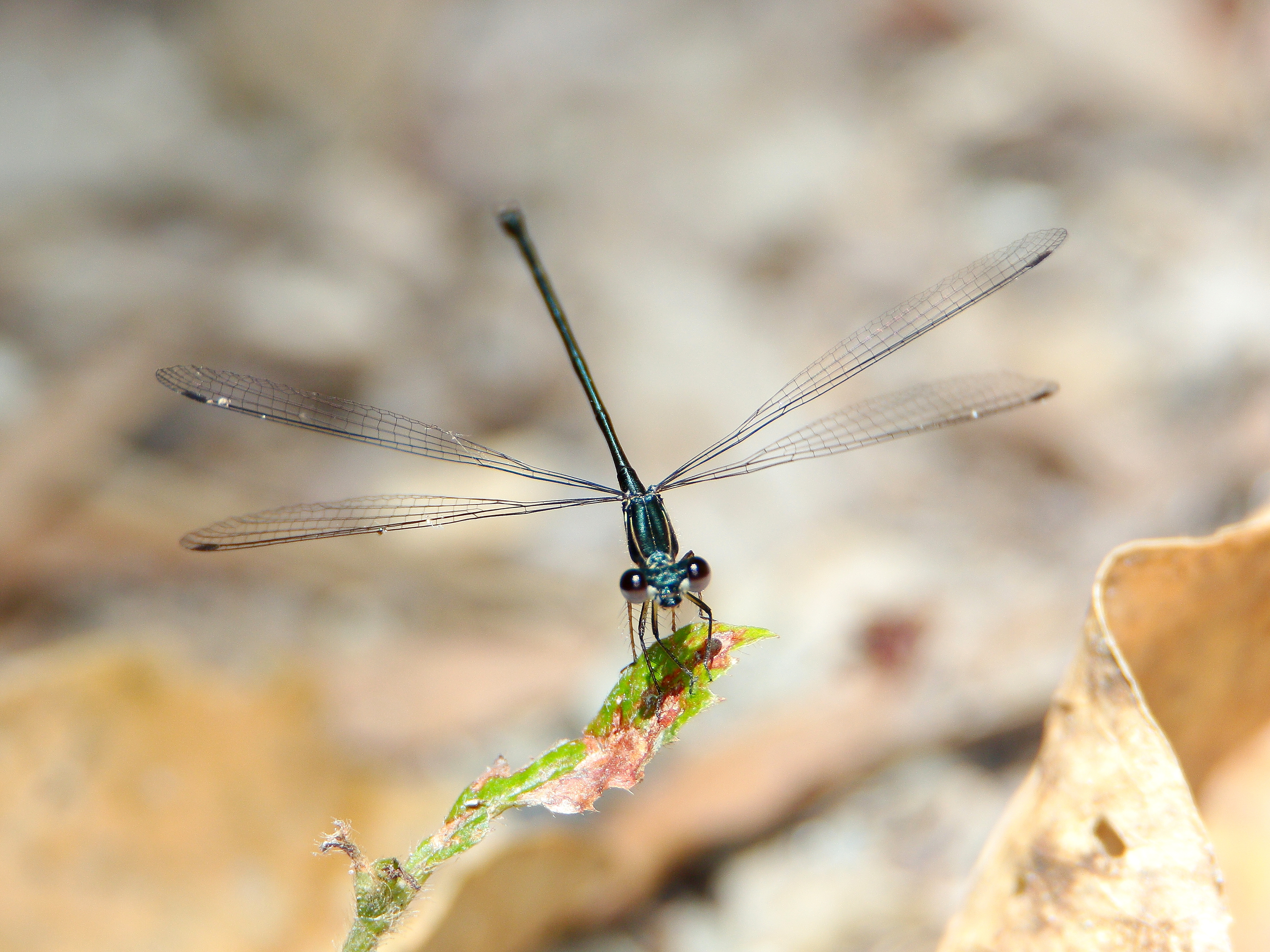
- Male, North Queensland

Conservation status
- Near Threatened (IUCN 3.1)

Scientific classification
- Kingdom: Animalia
- Phylum: Arthropoda
- Clade: Pancrustacea
- Class: Insecta
- Order: Odonata
- Suborder: Zygoptera
- Family: Argiolestidae
- Genus: Griseargiolestes
- Species: G. metallicus

Binomial name
- Griseargiolestes metallicus (Sjöstedt, 1917)

Synonyms
- Argiolestes metallicus Sjöstedt, 1917

= Griseargiolestes metallicus =

Metallic flatwing

Species of damselfly

Griseargiolestes metallicus is a species of Australian damselfly in the family Argiolestidae, commonly known as a metallic flatwing. It has only been recorded from rainforests in the vicinity of Tully Gorge National Park in northern Queensland, where it inhabits streams.

Griseargiolestes metallicus is a medium-sized damselfly, black-green metallic in colour with pale markings, without pruinescence. Like other members of the family Argiolestidae, it rests with its wings outspread.

== Etymology ==
The genus name Griseargiolestes combines the Latin griseus ("grey" or "pearl-grey") with Argiolestes, the name of a related genus. It refers to the pale pruinescence seen in this group.

The species name metallicus is Latin for "metallic", referring to the blue metallic colouring of the head, thorax, and abdomen.

== Gallery ==
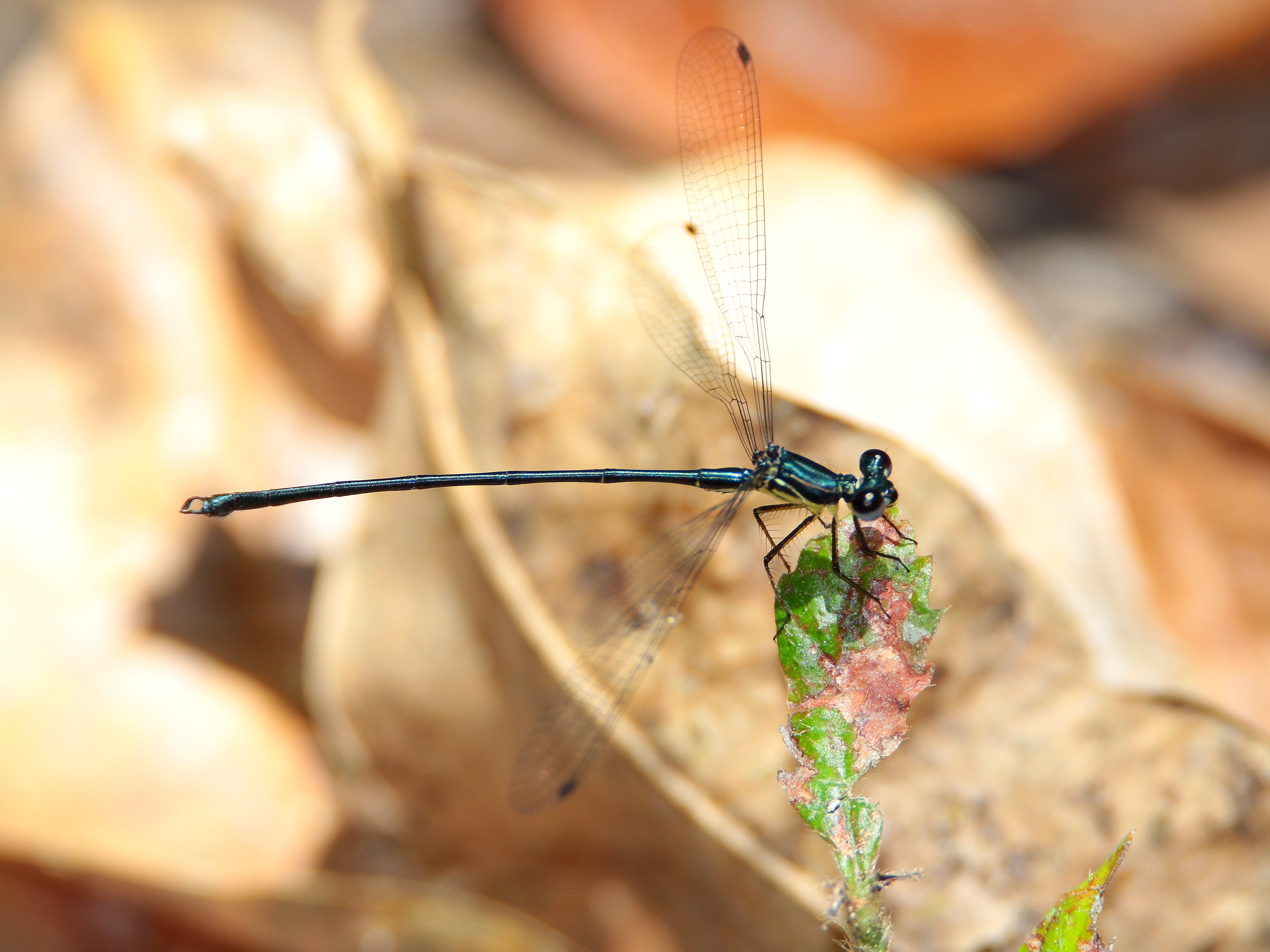
Male, right hand side

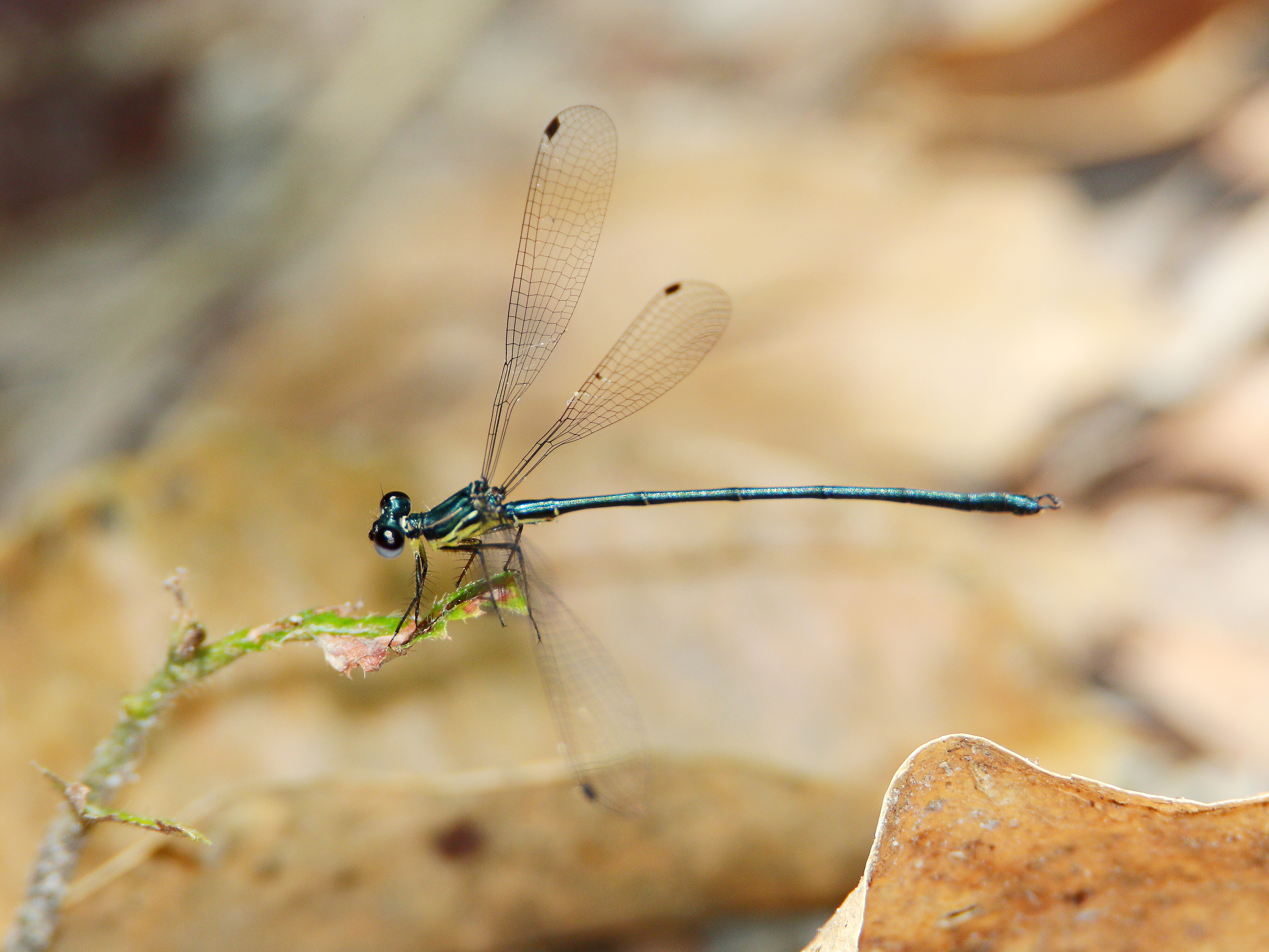
Male, left hand side

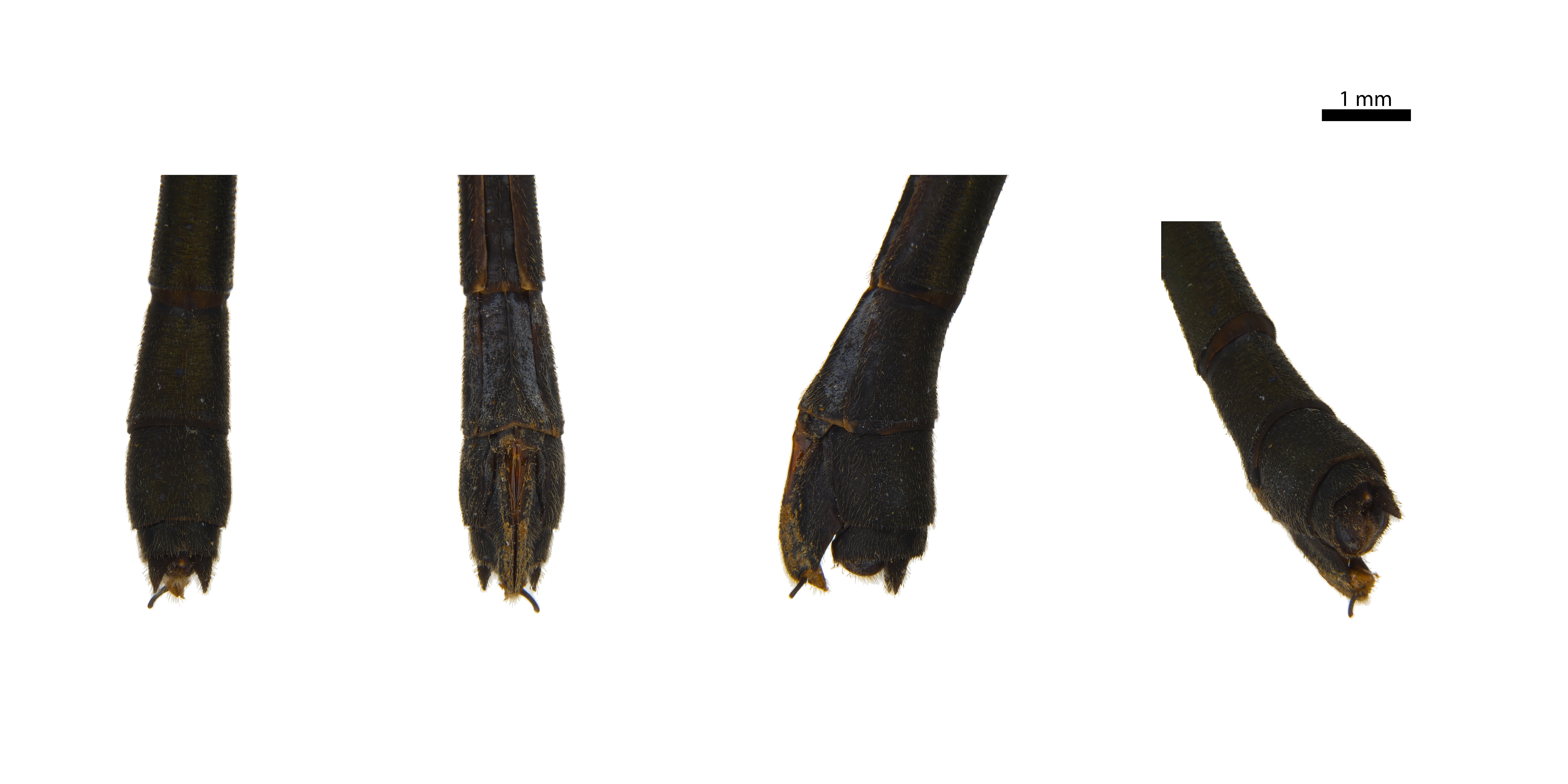
Tip of female tail

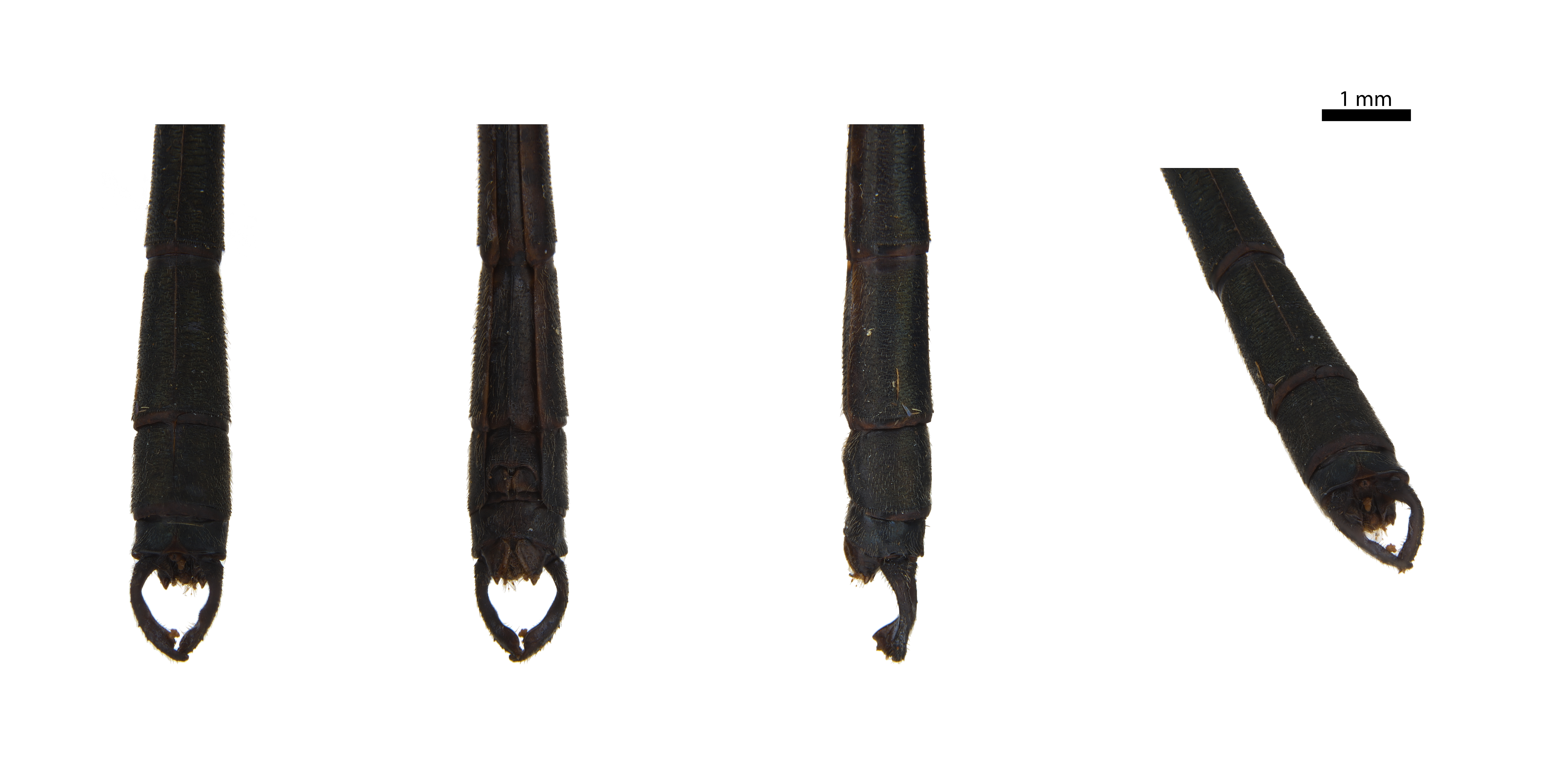
Tip of male tail

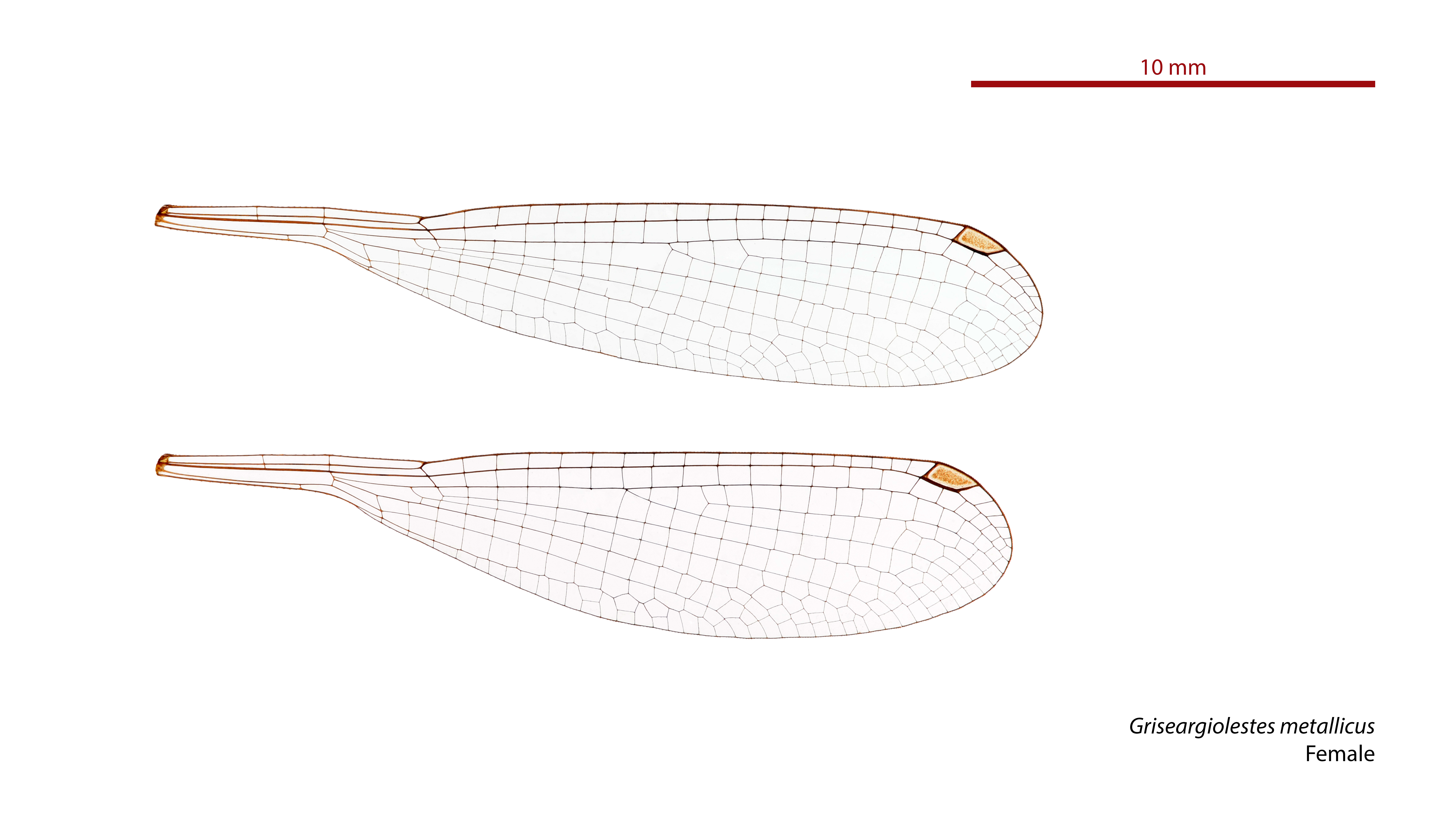
Female wings

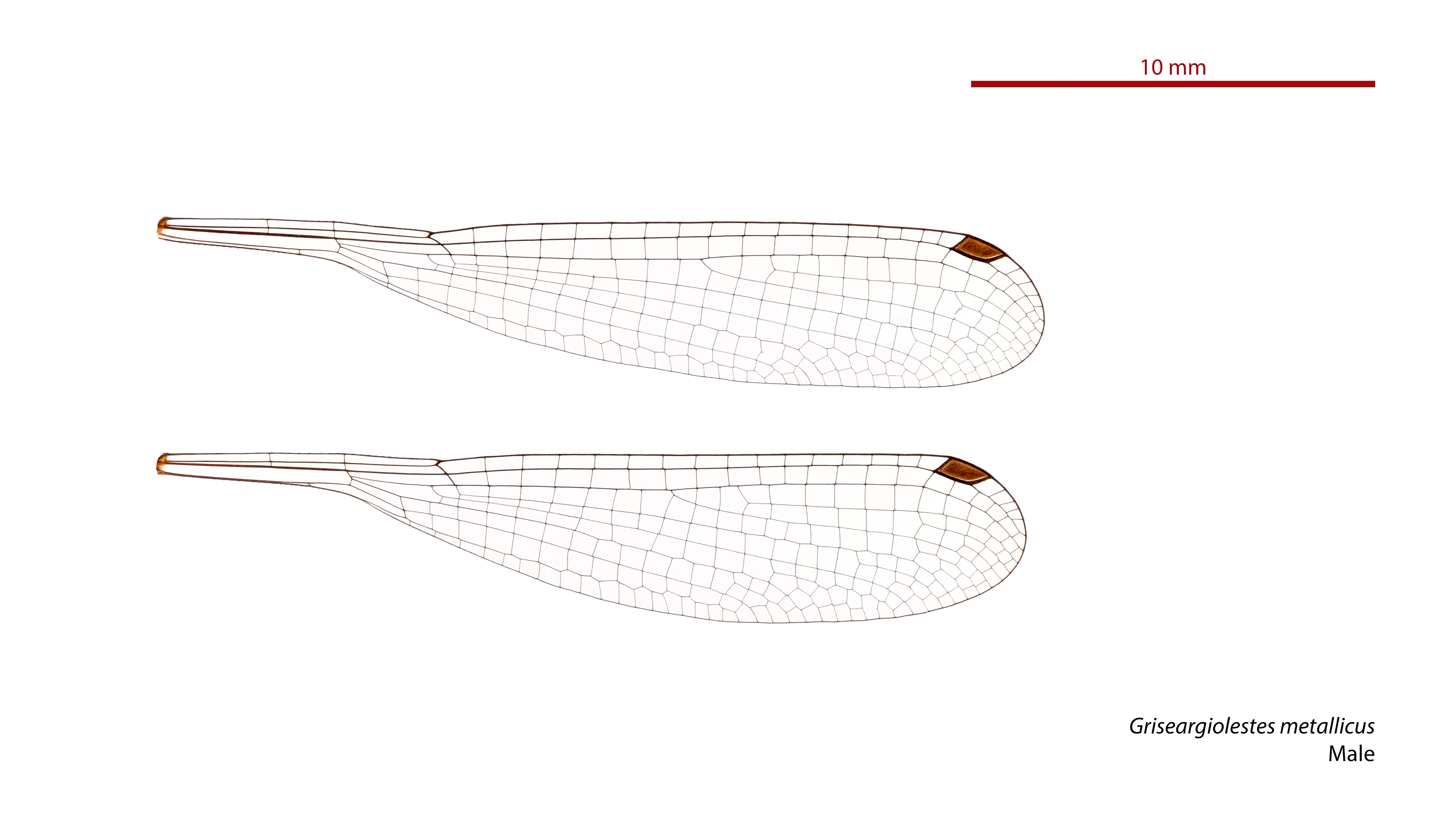
Male wings

== See also ==
- List of Odonata species of Australia
