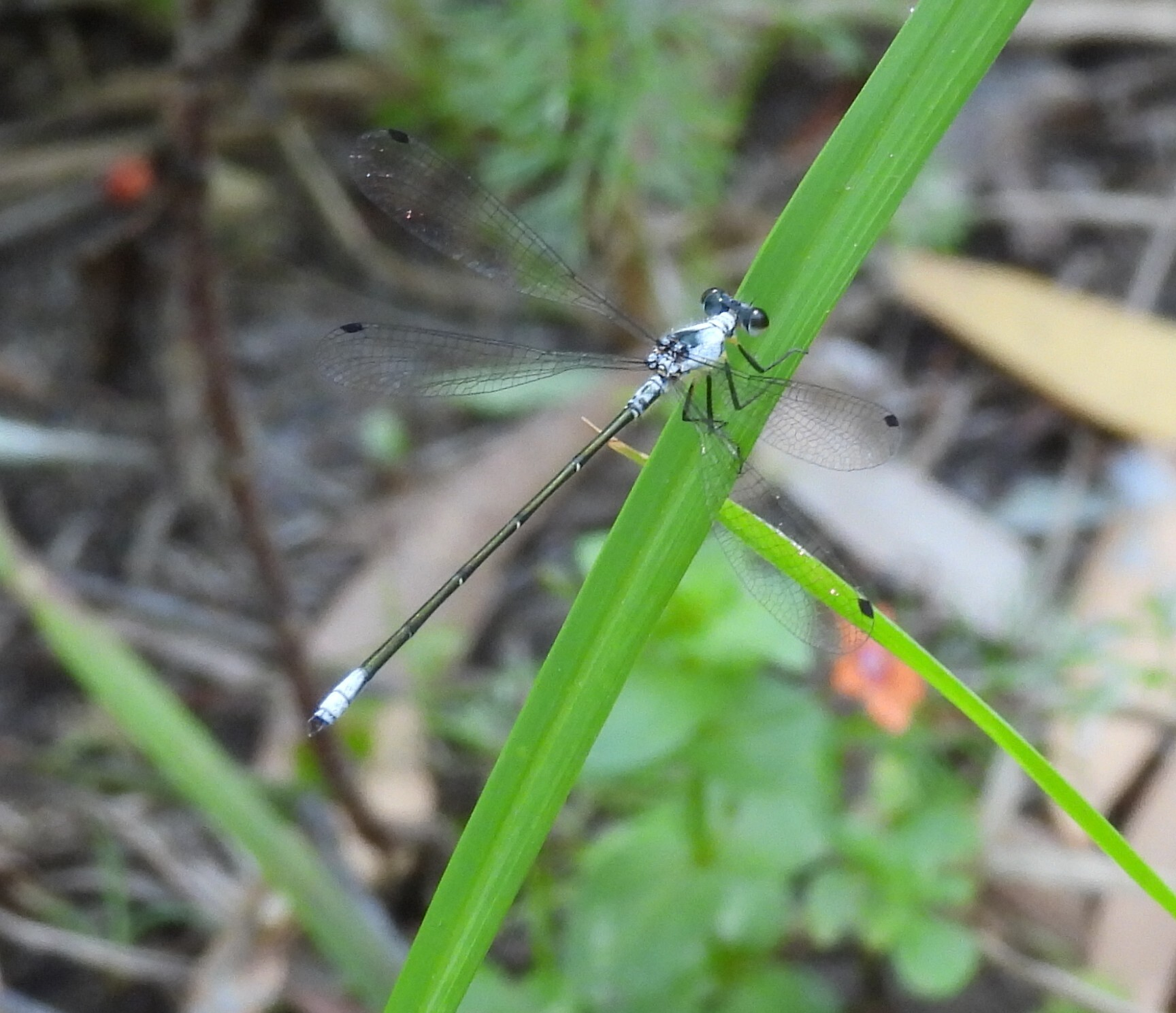
- Male

Conservation status
- Least Concern (IUCN 3.1)

Scientific classification
- Kingdom: Animalia
- Phylum: Arthropoda
- Clade: Pancrustacea
- Class: Insecta
- Order: Odonata
- Suborder: Zygoptera
- Family: Argiolestidae
- Genus: Griseargiolestes
- Species: G. albescens

Binomial name
- Griseargiolestes albescens (Tillyard, 1913)

Synonyms
- Argiolestes griseus albescens Tillyard, 1913

= Coastal flatwing =

Griseargiolestes albescens

Species of damselfly

Griseargiolestes albescens is a species of Australian damselfly in the family Argiolestidae. It is commonly known as a coastal flatwing.

Coastal flatwings are medium sized damselflies; males are about 37 mm in length and the slightly smaller females are about 34 mm. They have a bronze-black colour marked with pale yellow, adult males are strongly pruinescent - their bodies and tip of their tails are covered with a fine, white, powdery layer. They are only found in south-eastern Queensland and north-eastern New South Wales, inhabiting creeks and streams, swampy areas, boggy seepages and lakes, and will often rest on the lower parts of plants. Like other flatwing damselflies, coastal flatwings rest with their wings open flat, though females will sometimes rest with their wings closed. Males and females mate in a wheel position. They are not skittish and will allow people to approach closely.

== Etymology ==
The genus name Griseargiolestes combines the Latin griseus ("grey" or "pearl-grey") with Argiolestes, the name of a related genus. It refers to the pale pruinescence seen in this group.

The species name albescens is derived from the Latin albesco ("becoming white"), referring to the development of white pruinescence as the adults mature.

== Gallery ==
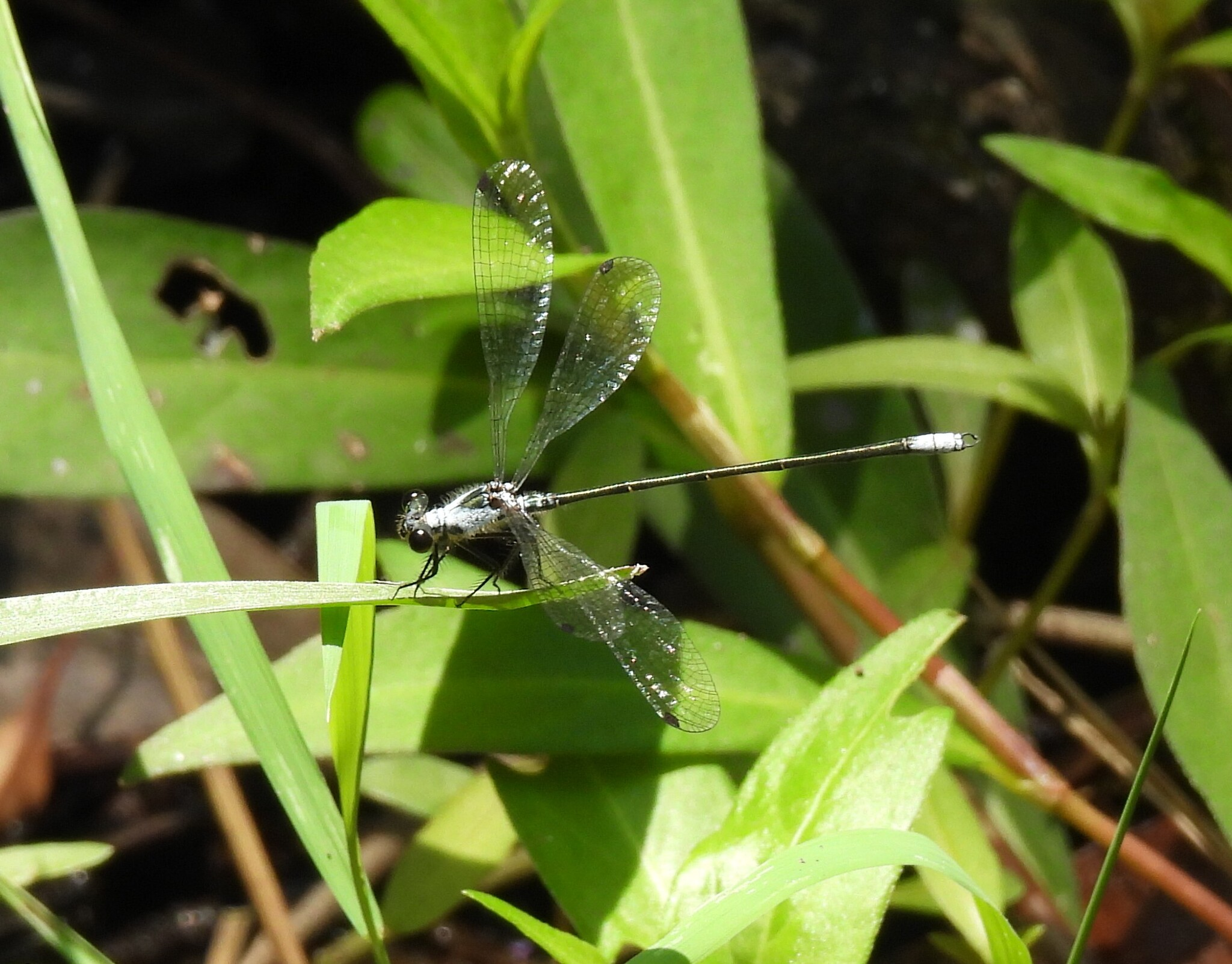
Male

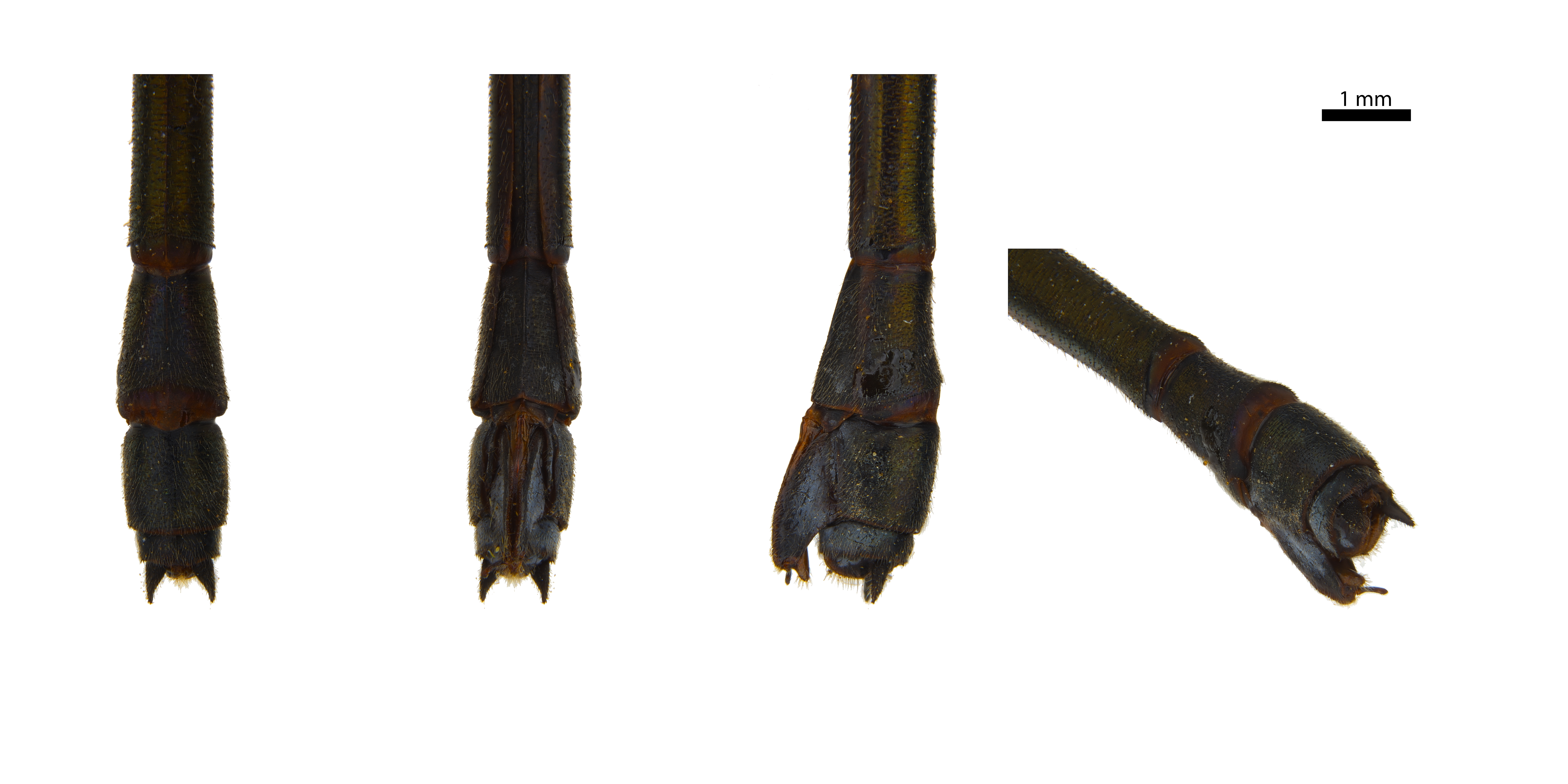
Tip of female tail

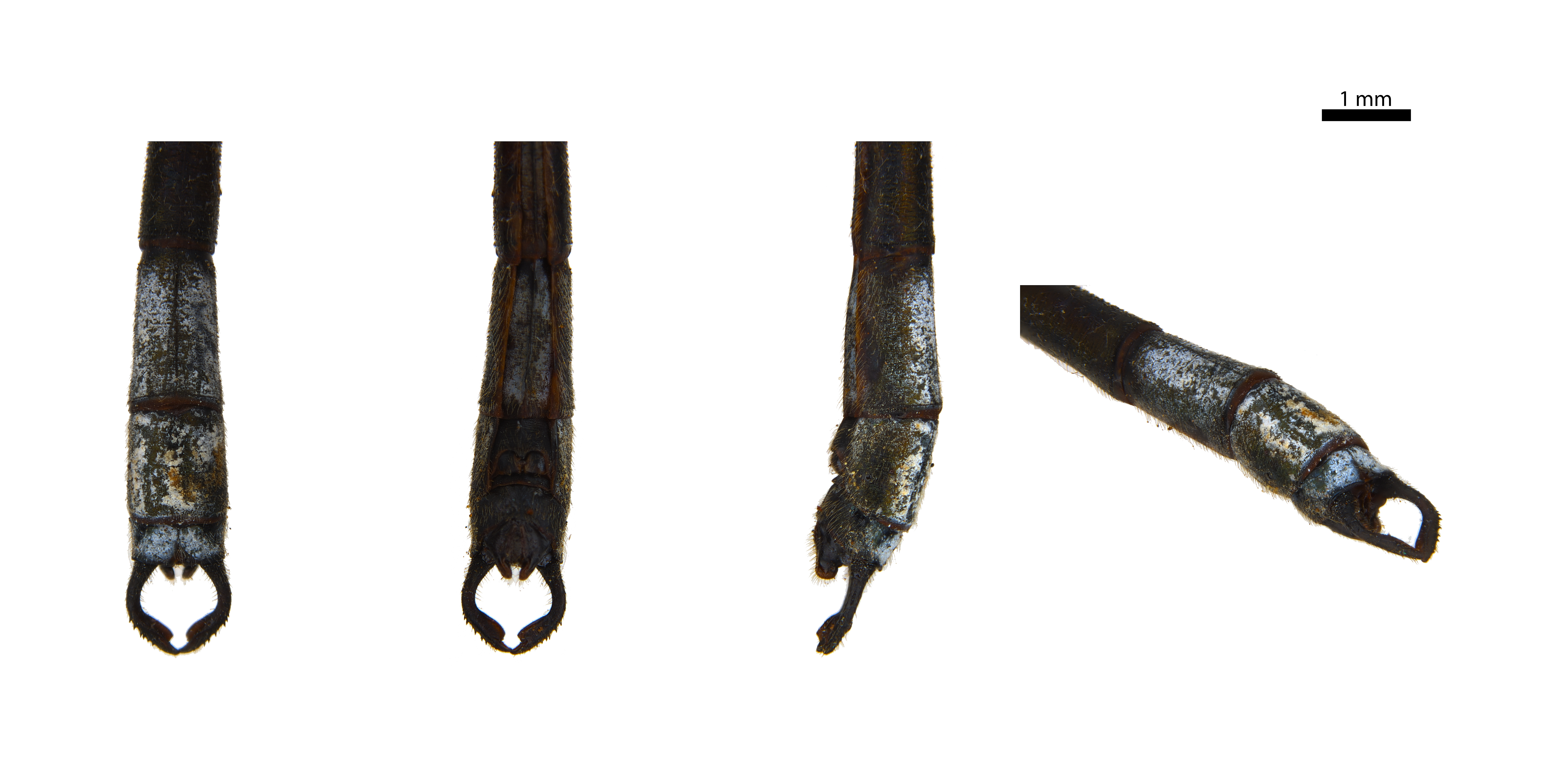
Tip of male tail - note the white pruinescence

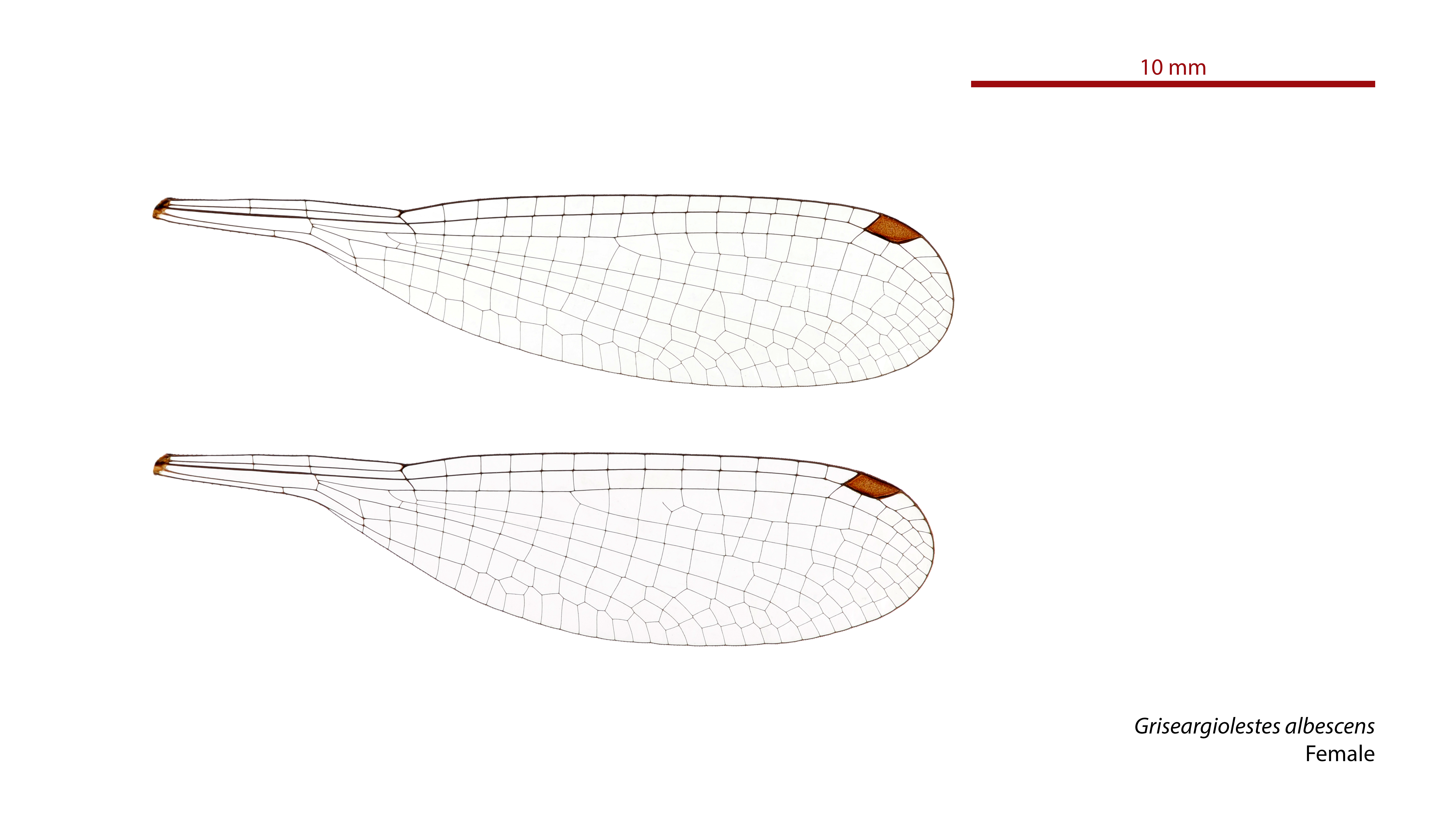
Female wings

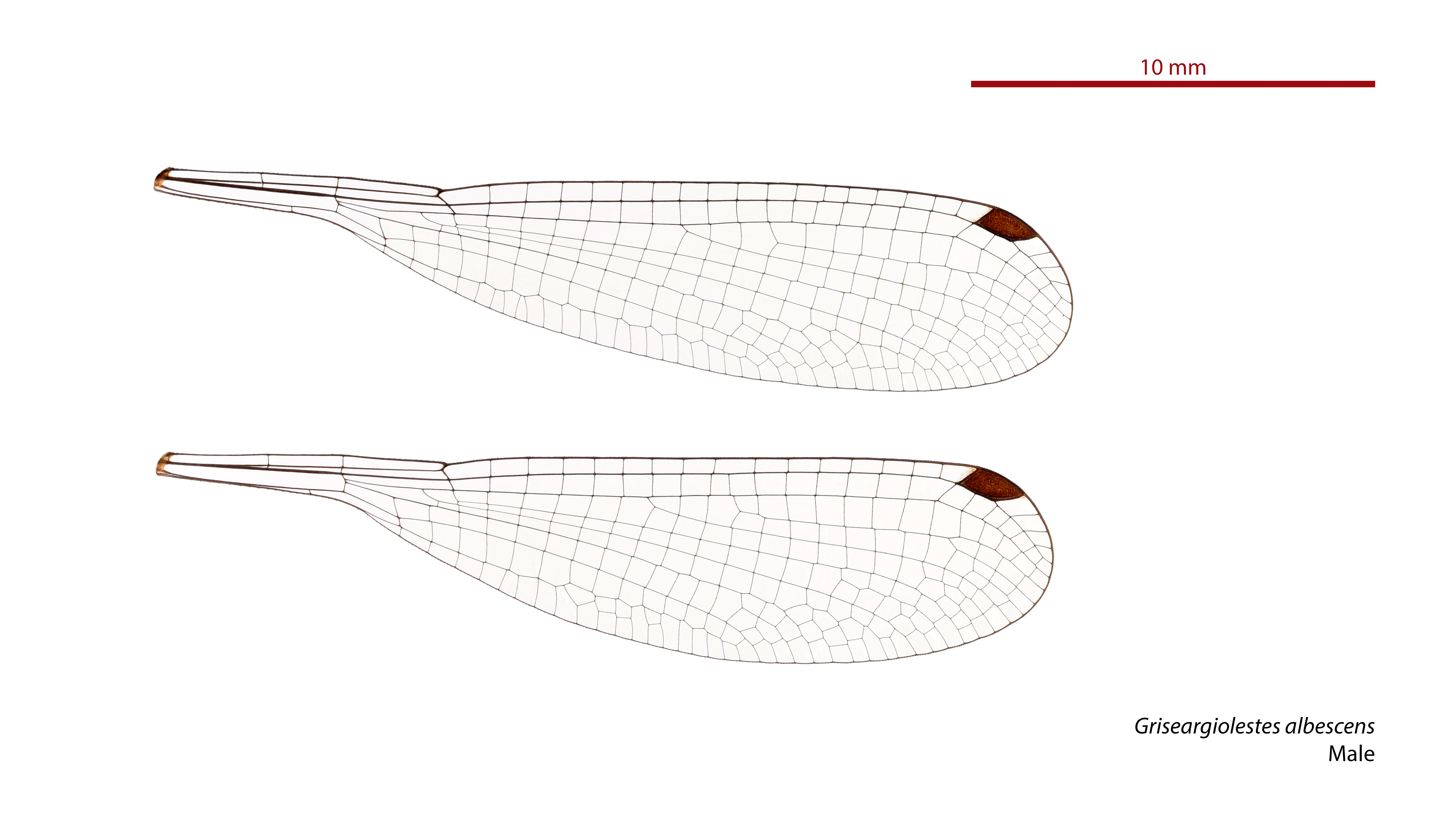
Male wings
