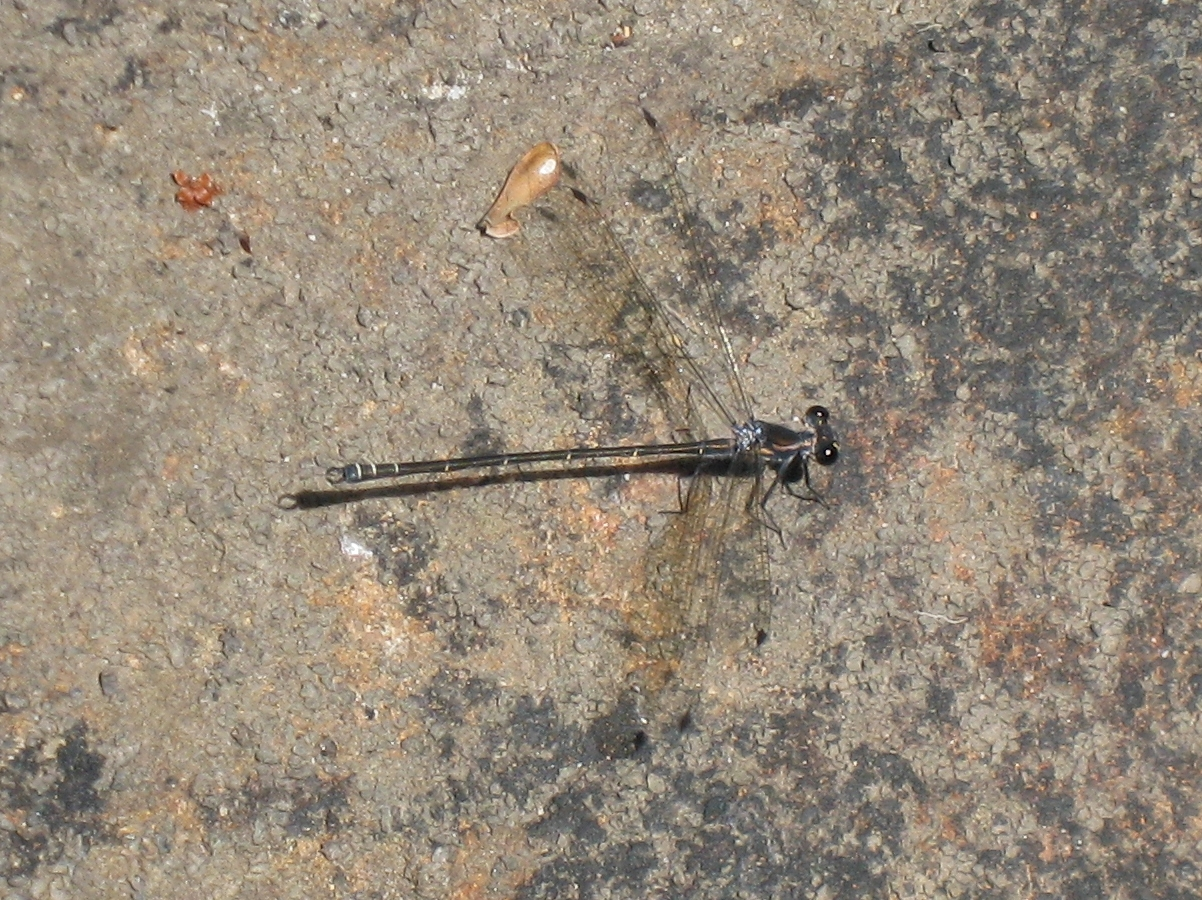
- Male Griseargiolestes griseus

Conservation status
- Least Concern (IUCN 3.1)

Scientific classification
- Kingdom: Animalia
- Phylum: Arthropoda
- Clade: Pancrustacea
- Class: Insecta
- Order: Odonata
- Suborder: Zygoptera
- Family: Argiolestidae
- Genus: Griseargiolestes
- Species: G. griseus

Binomial name
- Griseargiolestes griseus (Hagen, 1862)

Synonyms
- Argiolestes grisea Hagen in Selys, 1862

= Griseargiolestes griseus =

Grey flatwing

Species of damselfly

Griseargiolestes griseus is a species of Australian damselfly in the family Argiolestidae, commonly known as a grey flatwing. It is endemic to south-eastern New South Wales, where it inhabits bogs and seepages near small streams.

Griseargiolestes griseus is a medium-sized damselfly, black-green metallic in colour with pale markings. Adults can be strongly pruinescent on their body and tail. Like other members of the family Argiolestidae, it rests with its wings outspread.

== Etymology ==
The genus name Griseargiolestes combines the Latin griseus ("grey" or "pearl-grey") with Argiolestes, the name of a related genus, referring to the pale pruinescence seen in this group.

In 1862, Hagen named the species griseus, also likely referring to this pale pruinescence.

== Gallery ==
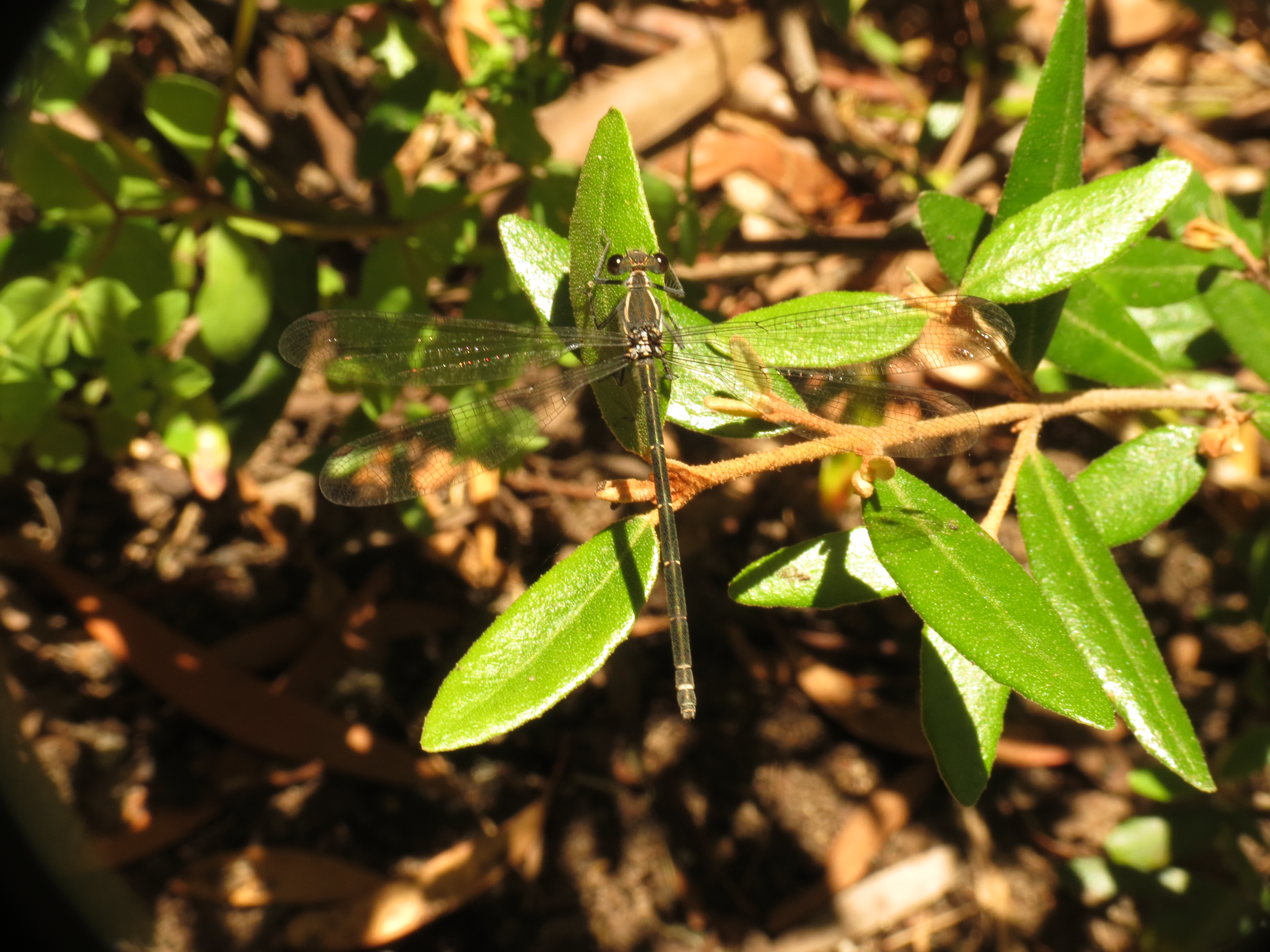
Female

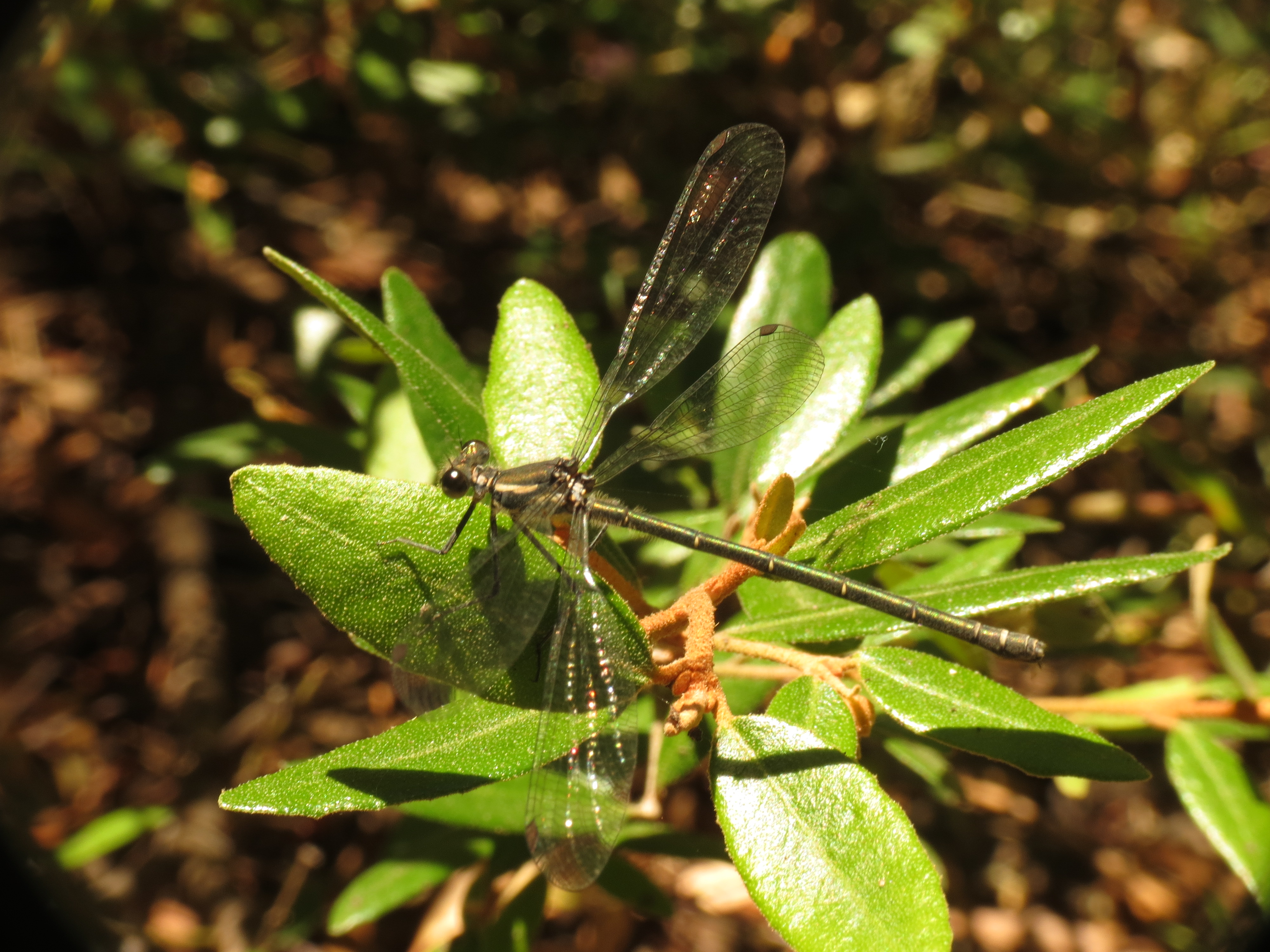
Female

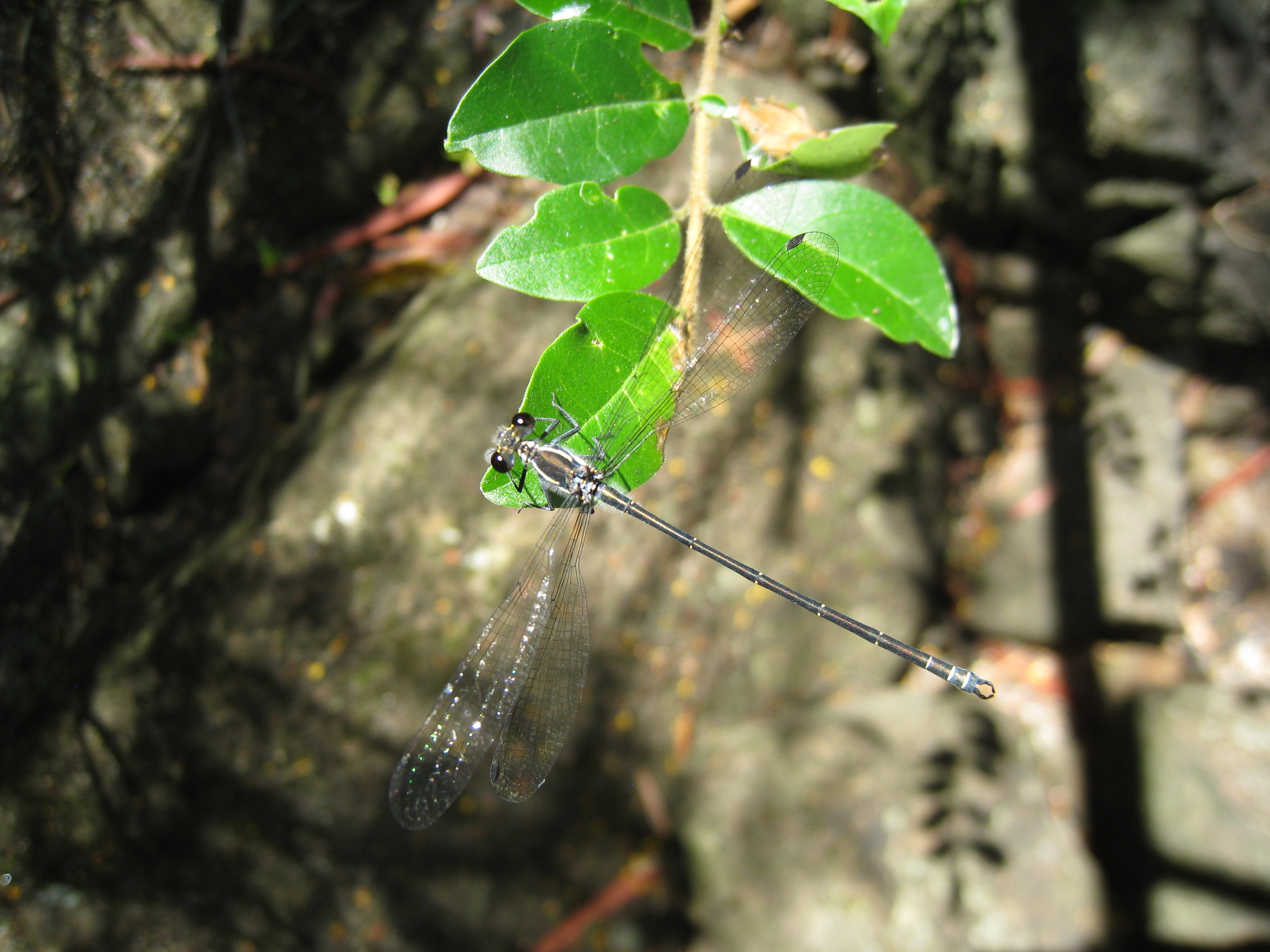
Male

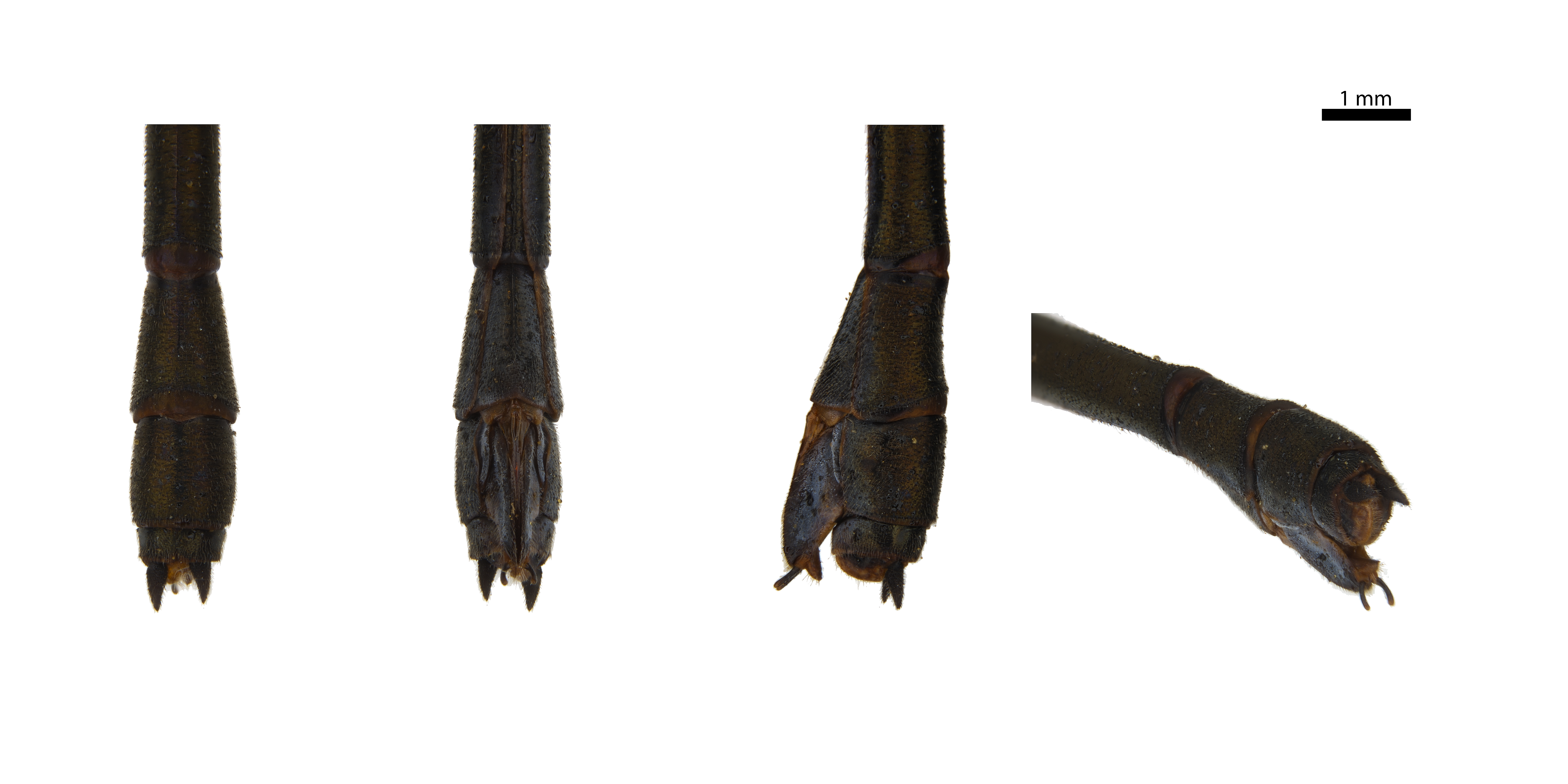
Tip of female tail

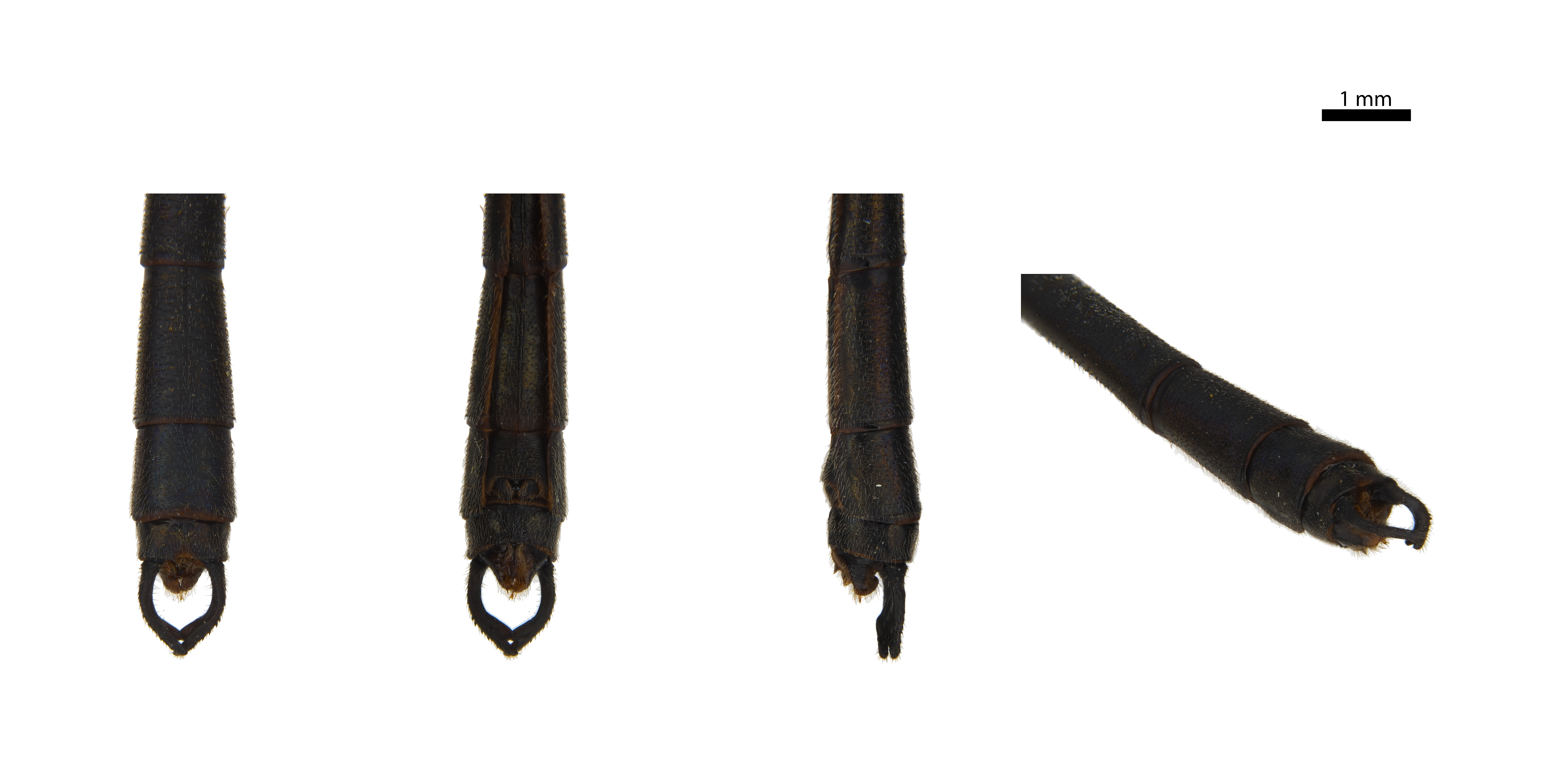
Tip of male tail

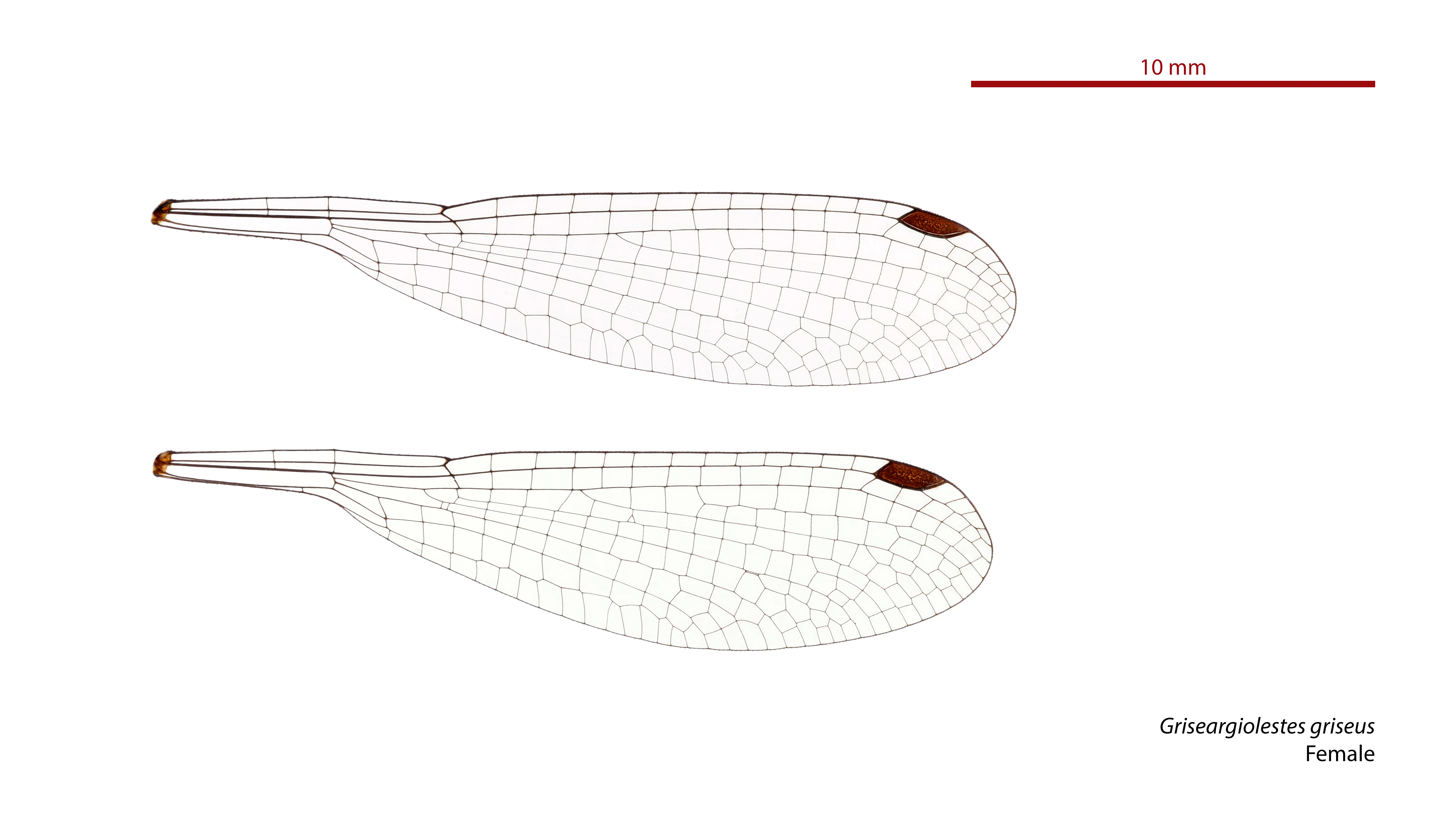
Female wings

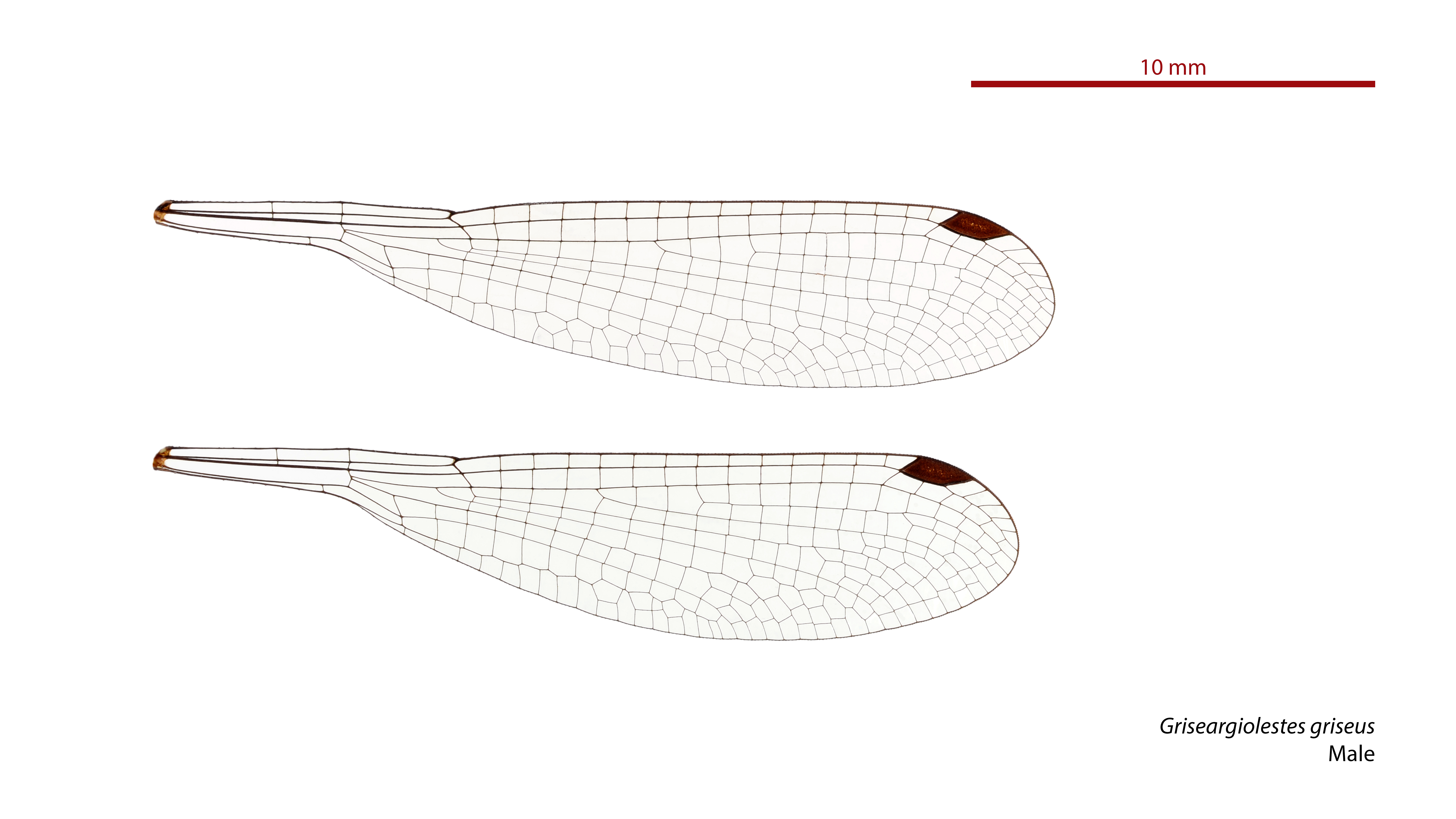
Male wings

== See also ==
- List of Odonata species of Australia
