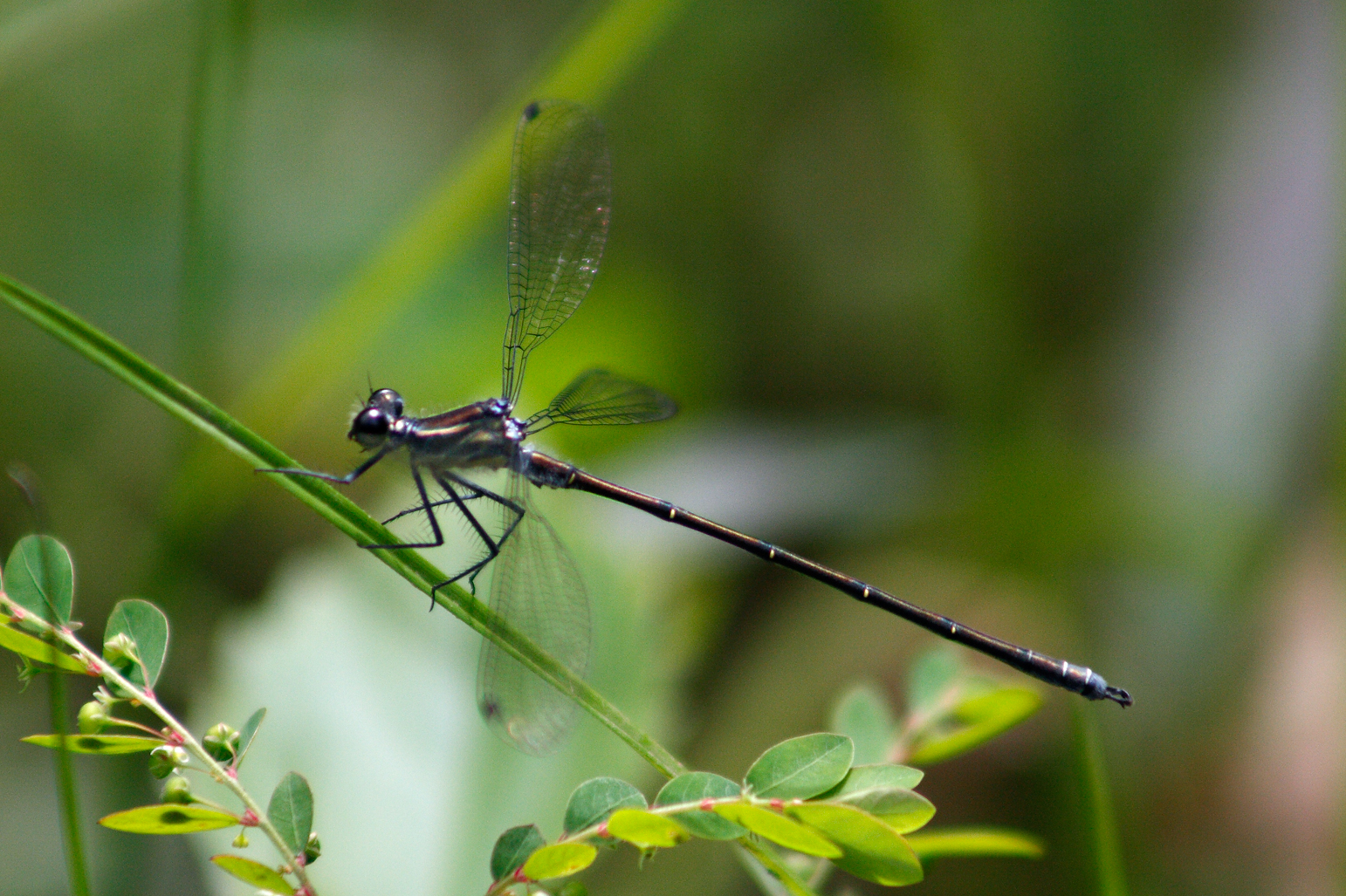
- Male
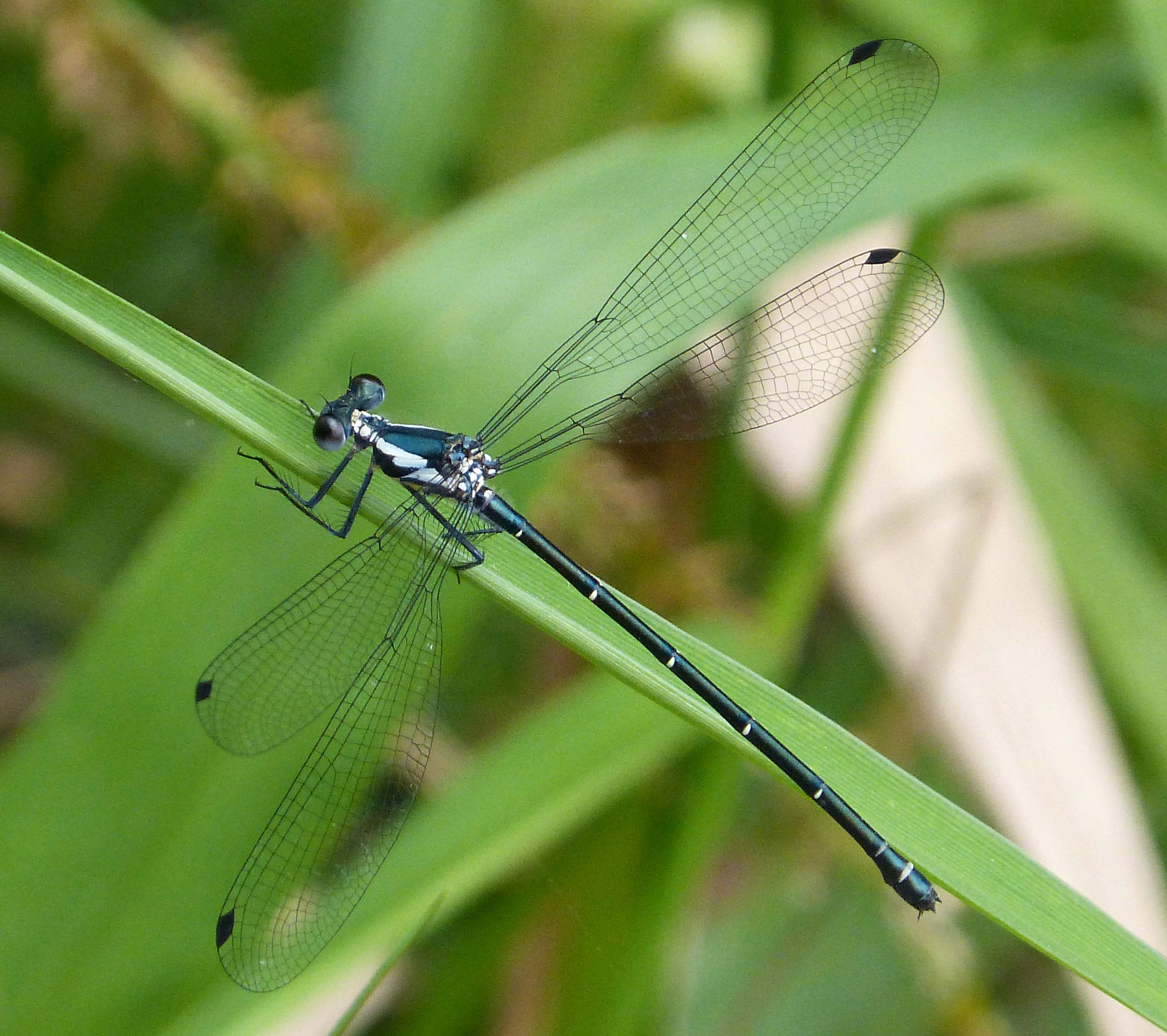
- Female

Conservation status
- Least Concern (IUCN 3.1)

Scientific classification
- Kingdom: Animalia
- Phylum: Arthropoda
- Clade: Pancrustacea
- Class: Insecta
- Order: Odonata
- Suborder: Zygoptera
- Family: Argiolestidae
- Genus: Austroargiolestes
- Species: A. icteromelas

Binomial name
- Austroargiolestes icteromelas (Selys, 1862)

Synonyms
- Argiolestes icteromelas Selys, 1862; Argiolestes icteromelas nobilis Tillyard, 1913; Argiolestes calcaris tenuis Fraser, 1959

= Common flatwing =

Species of damselfly

The common flatwing (Austroargiolestes icteromelas) is a very common species of damselfly of the subfamily Argiolestinae in the family Argiolestidae. It is also known as an Australian flatwing.

Both male and female common flatwings look similar, with a long and slender body about 43 mm in length, and a bright metallic-blue colour. They usually rest with their wings flat open, but females sometimes rest with wings folded up. Their antennae are very small, and their compound eyes are comparatively large. Common flatwings do not use their legs for walking, but for capturing other flying insects in the air, like all other dragonflies and damselflies. They can be found along streams and creeks, are seldom found near still water ponds, but are more likely to be found near slow running water. This species likes to rest within a few metres of a creek or stream, in a shaded area, sometimes resting in large groups among plants. They perch on leaves and, when disturbed, fly a short distance. Common flatwings tolerate people close to them.

== Subspecies ==
Austroargiolestes icteromelas has a two subspecies: Austroargiolestes icteromelas icteromelas, which has a pale mouth (labium) and is from southern and cooler parts, and Austroargiolestes icteromelas nigrolabiatus, which has a dark mouth and is from more northern and warmer regions.

== Distribution ==
The common flatwing is found in eastern Australia: in Australian Capital Territory, New South Wales, Queensland, and Victoria.

== Etymology ==
The genus name Austroargiolestes combines the prefix austro- (from Latin auster, meaning “south wind”, hence “southern”) with Argiolestes, the name of a related genus. It refers to a southern representative of that group.

The species name icteromelas is derived from Greek ἴκτερος (ikteros, "yellow") and μέλας (melas, "black"), referring to the yellow and black colour of the thorax.

== Gallery ==
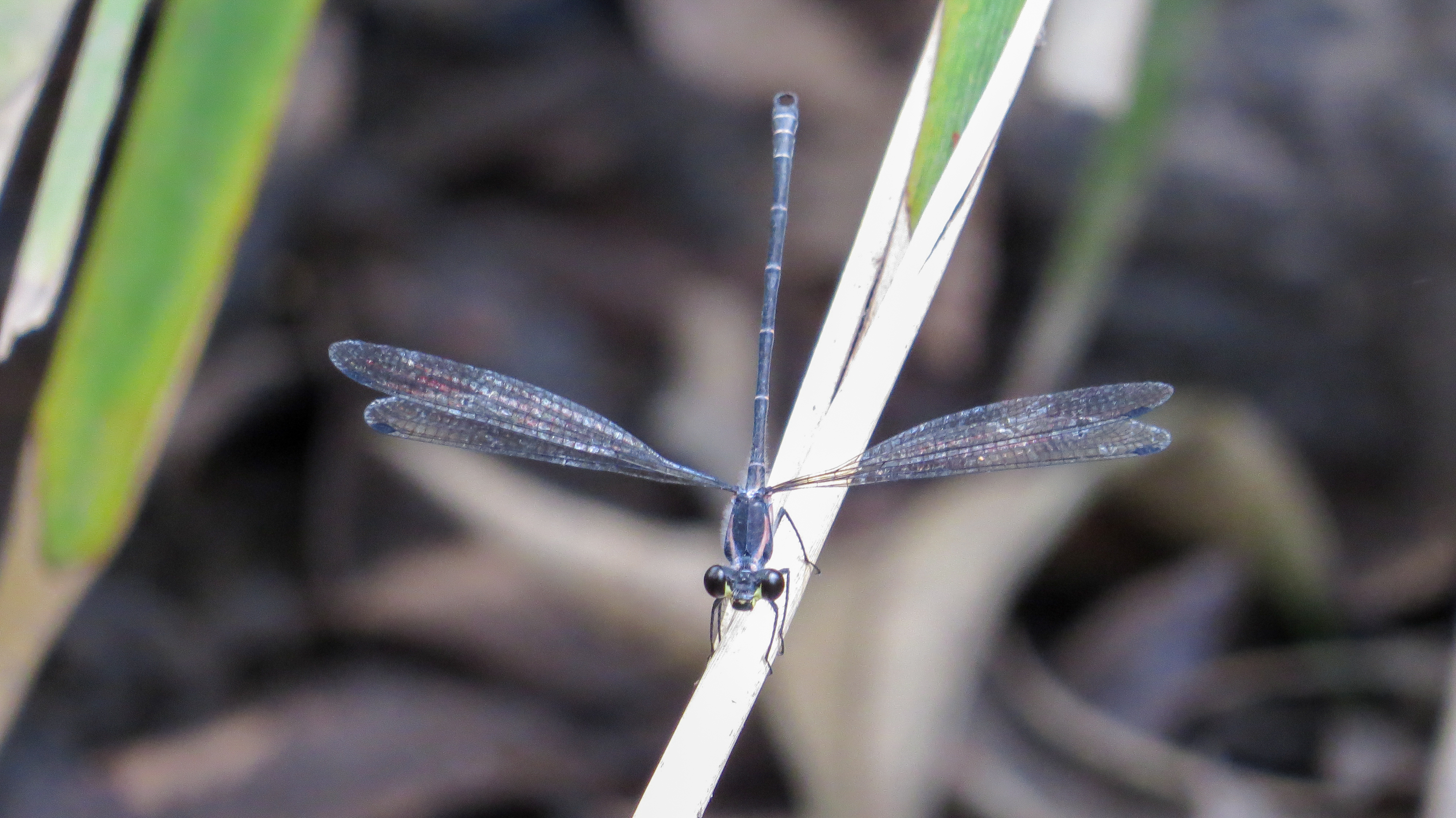
Male

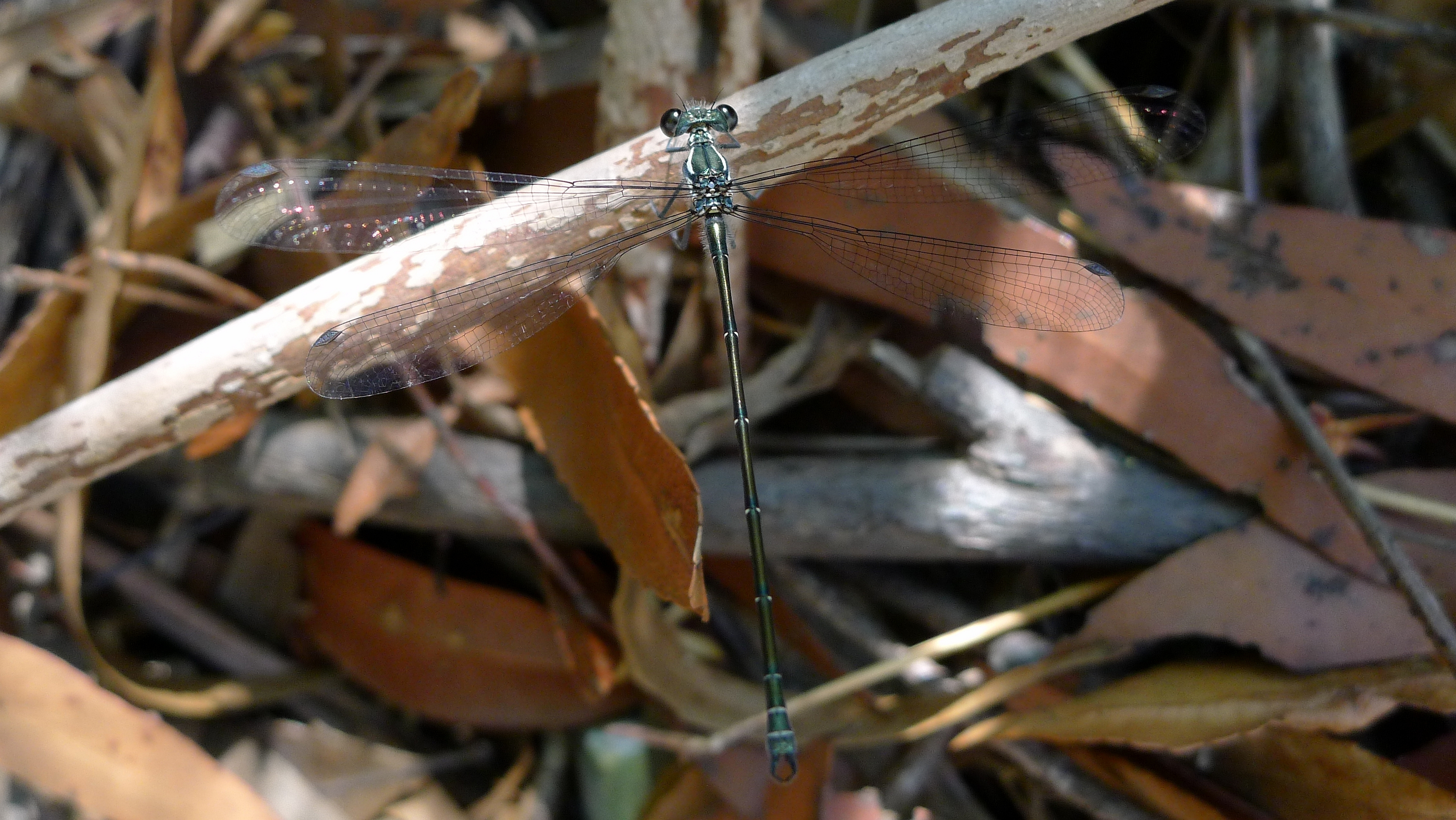
Male

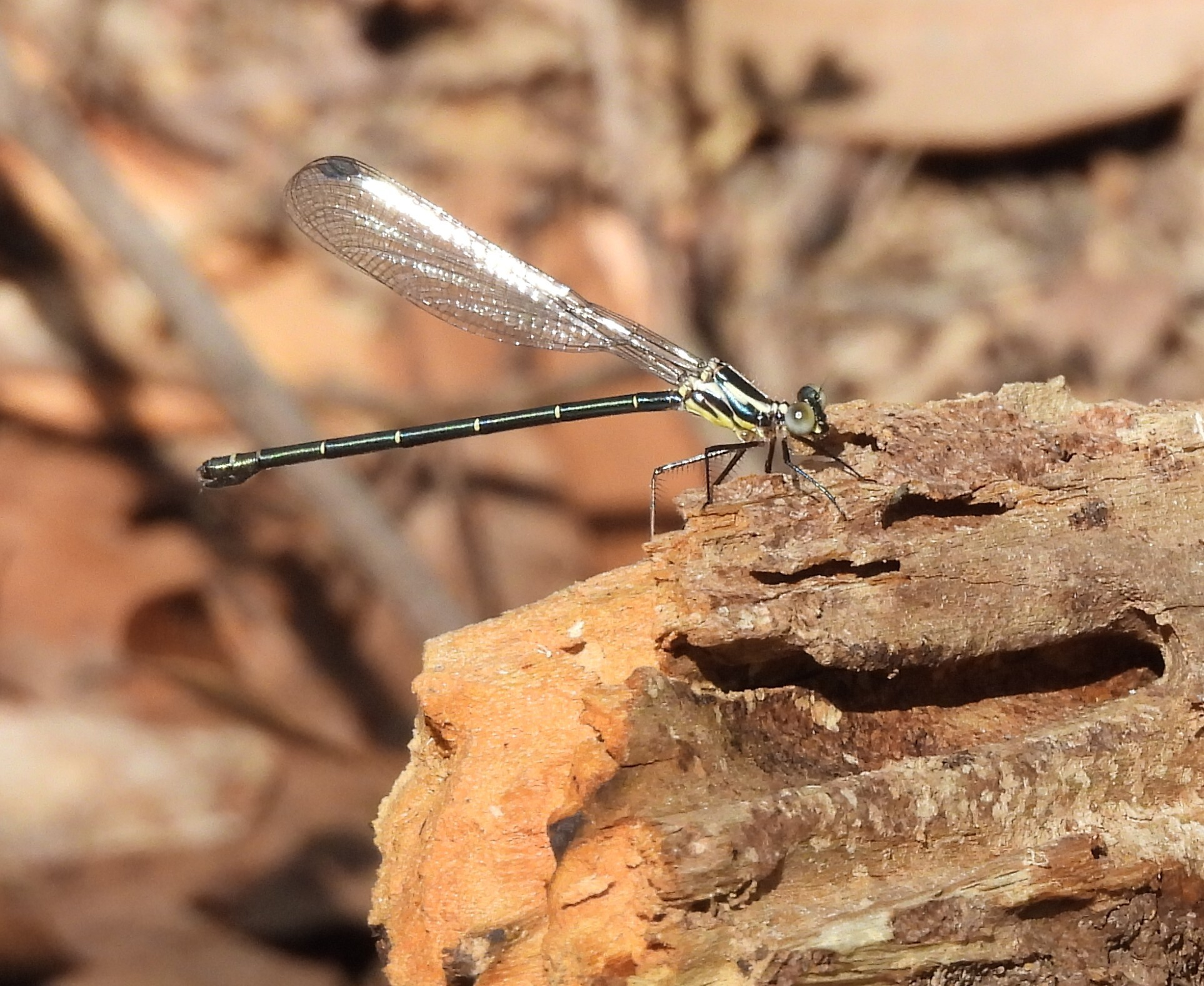
Recently emerged female with wings held together

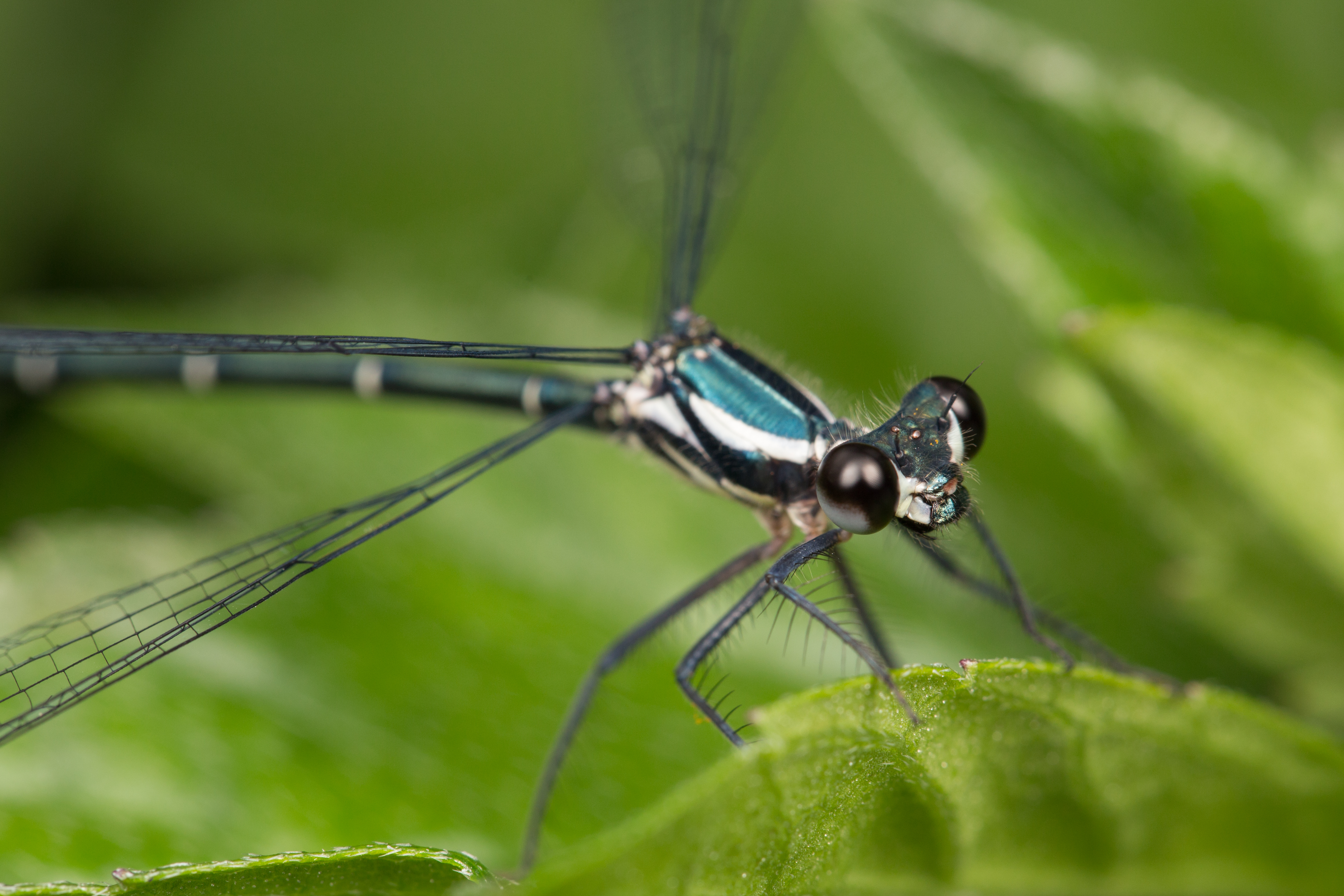
Austroargiolestes icteromelas nigrolabiatus in Brisbane

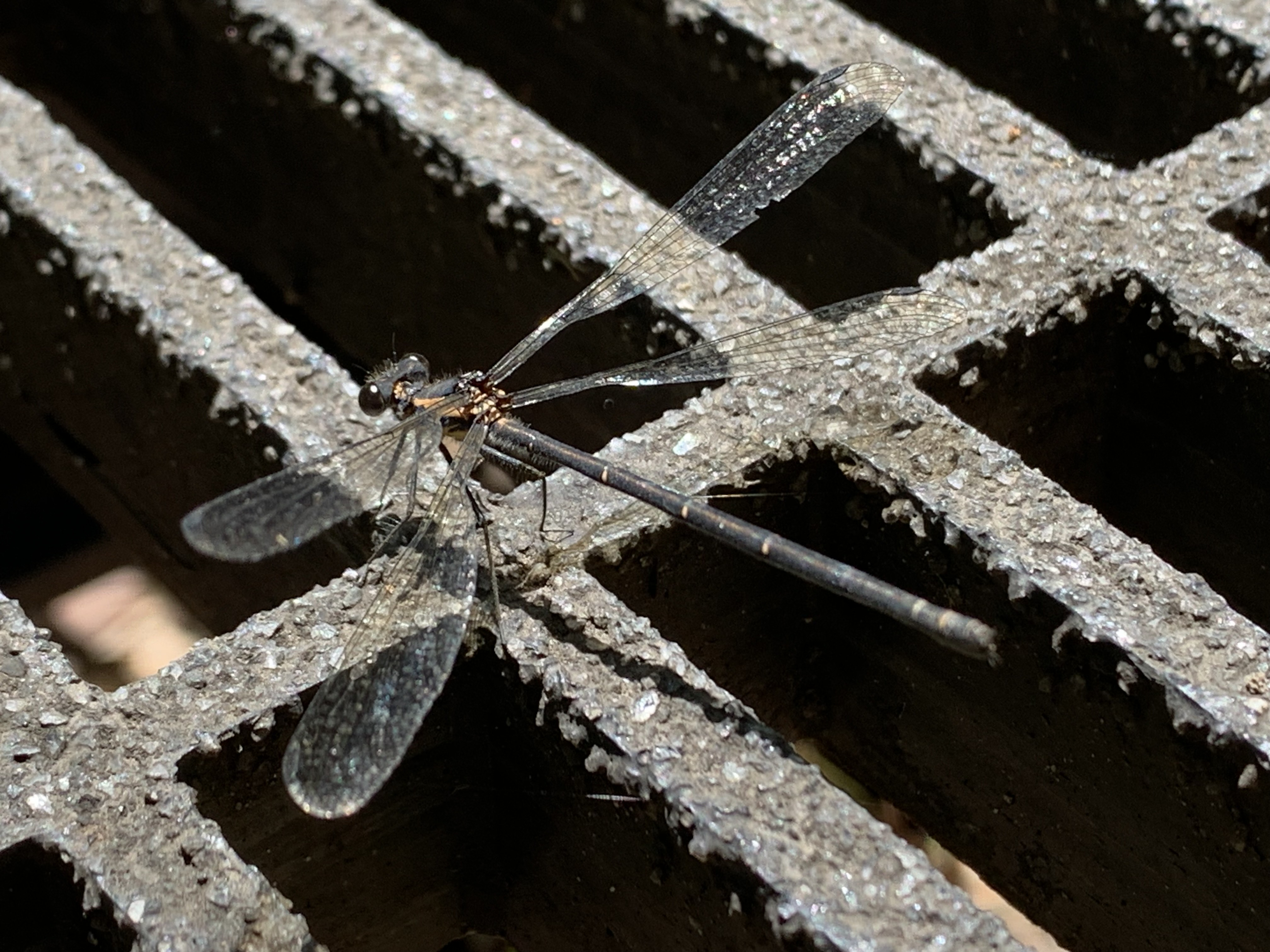

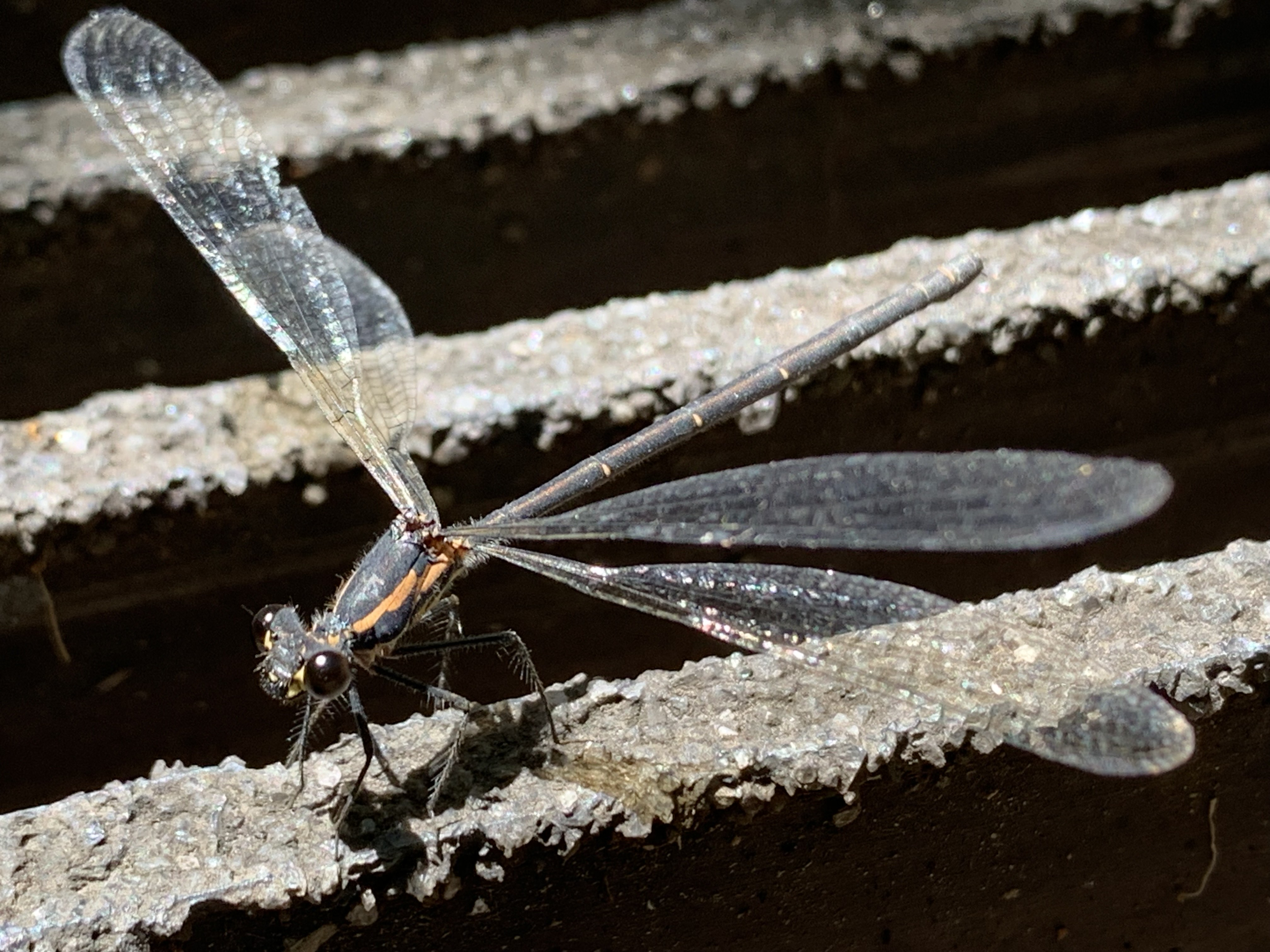

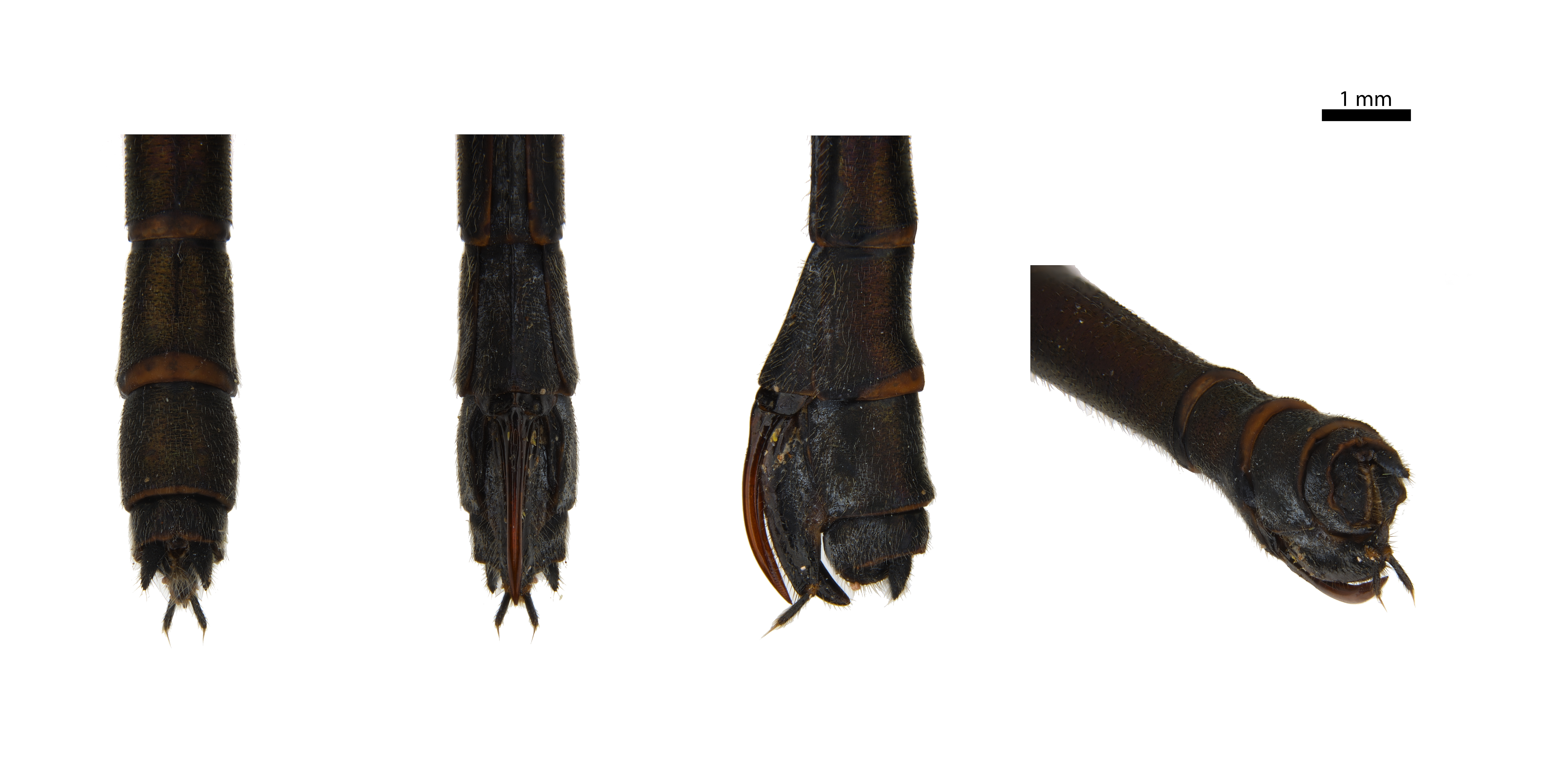
Tip of female tail

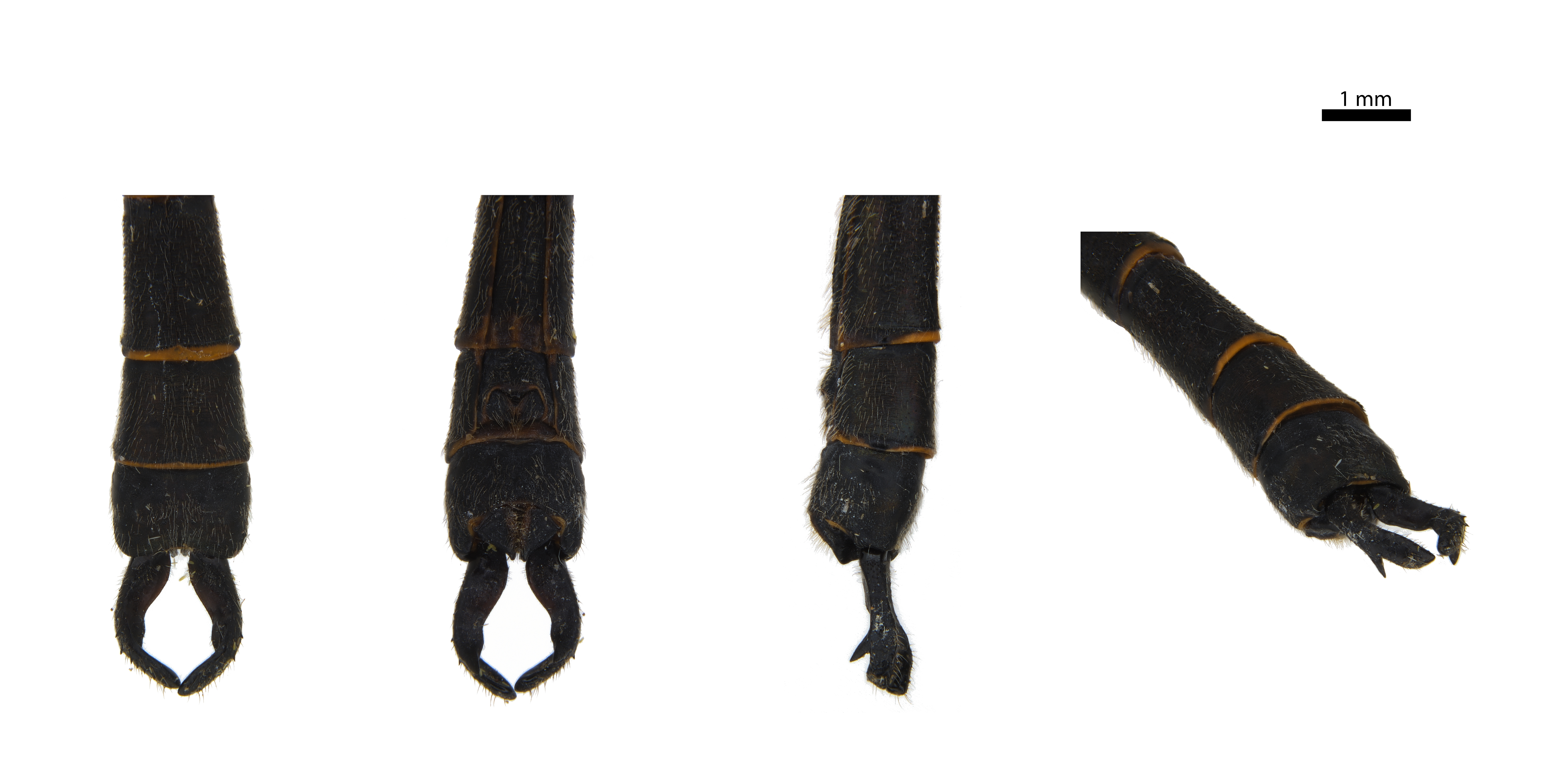
Tip of male tail

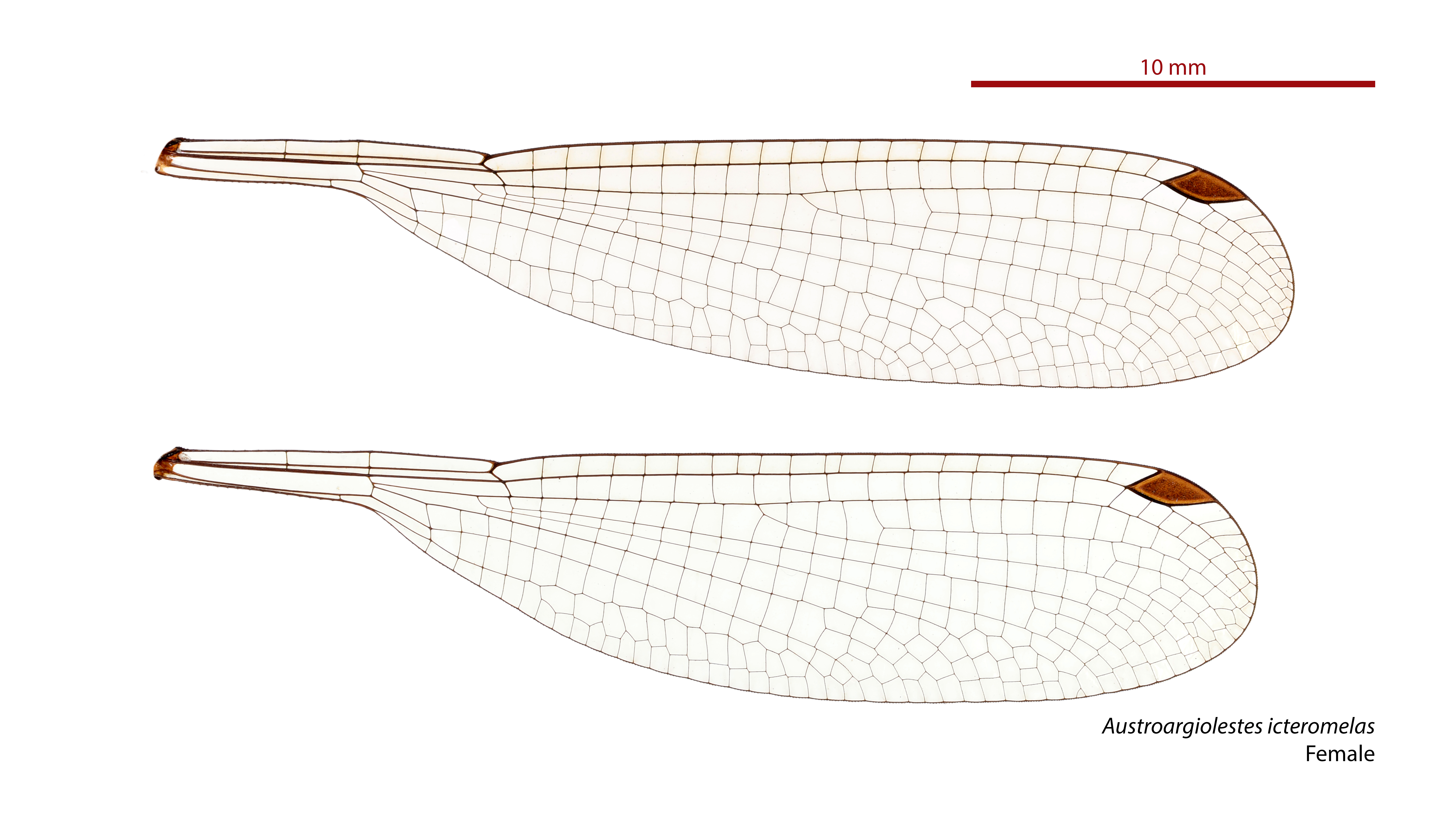
Female wings

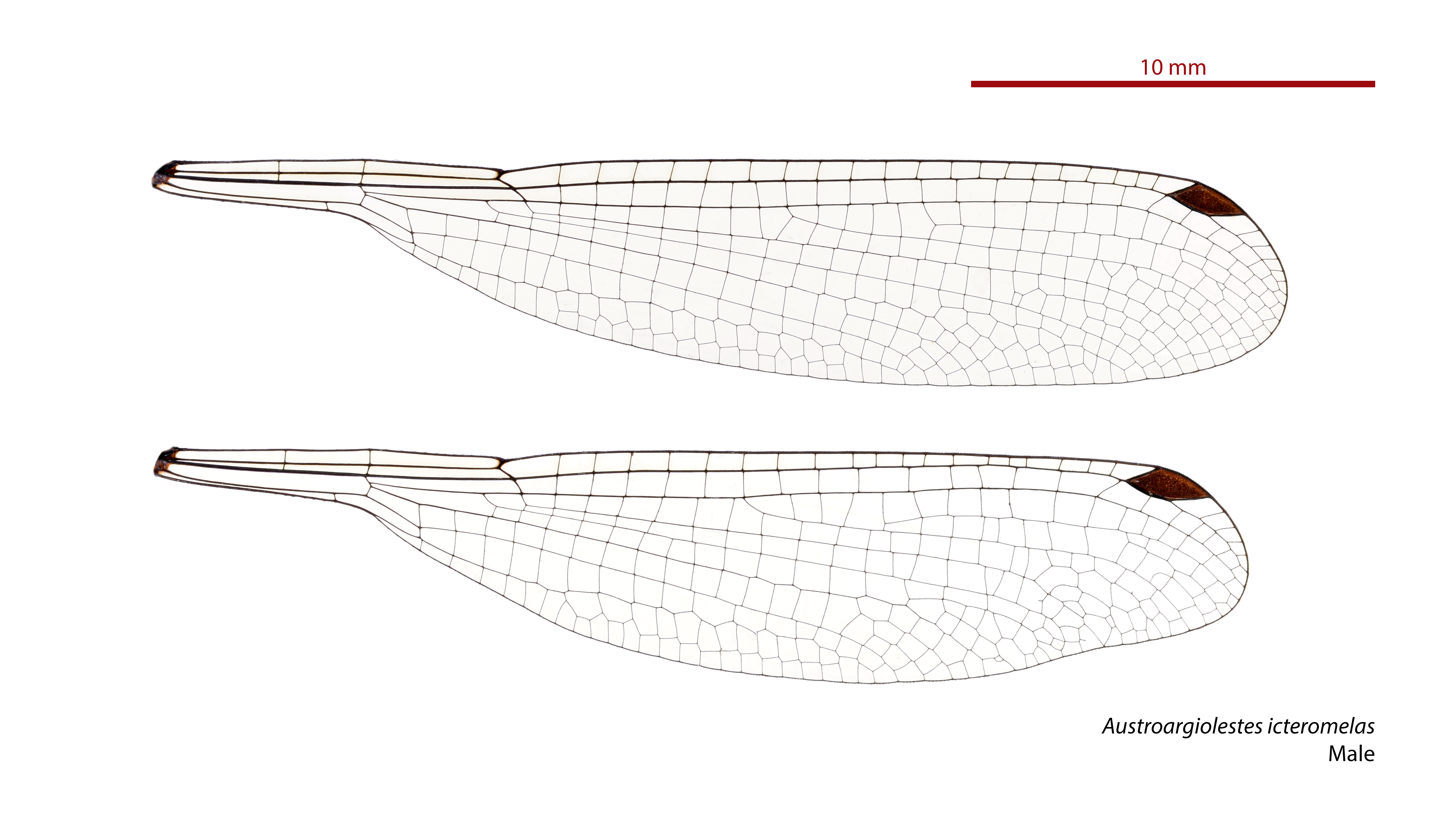
Male wings
