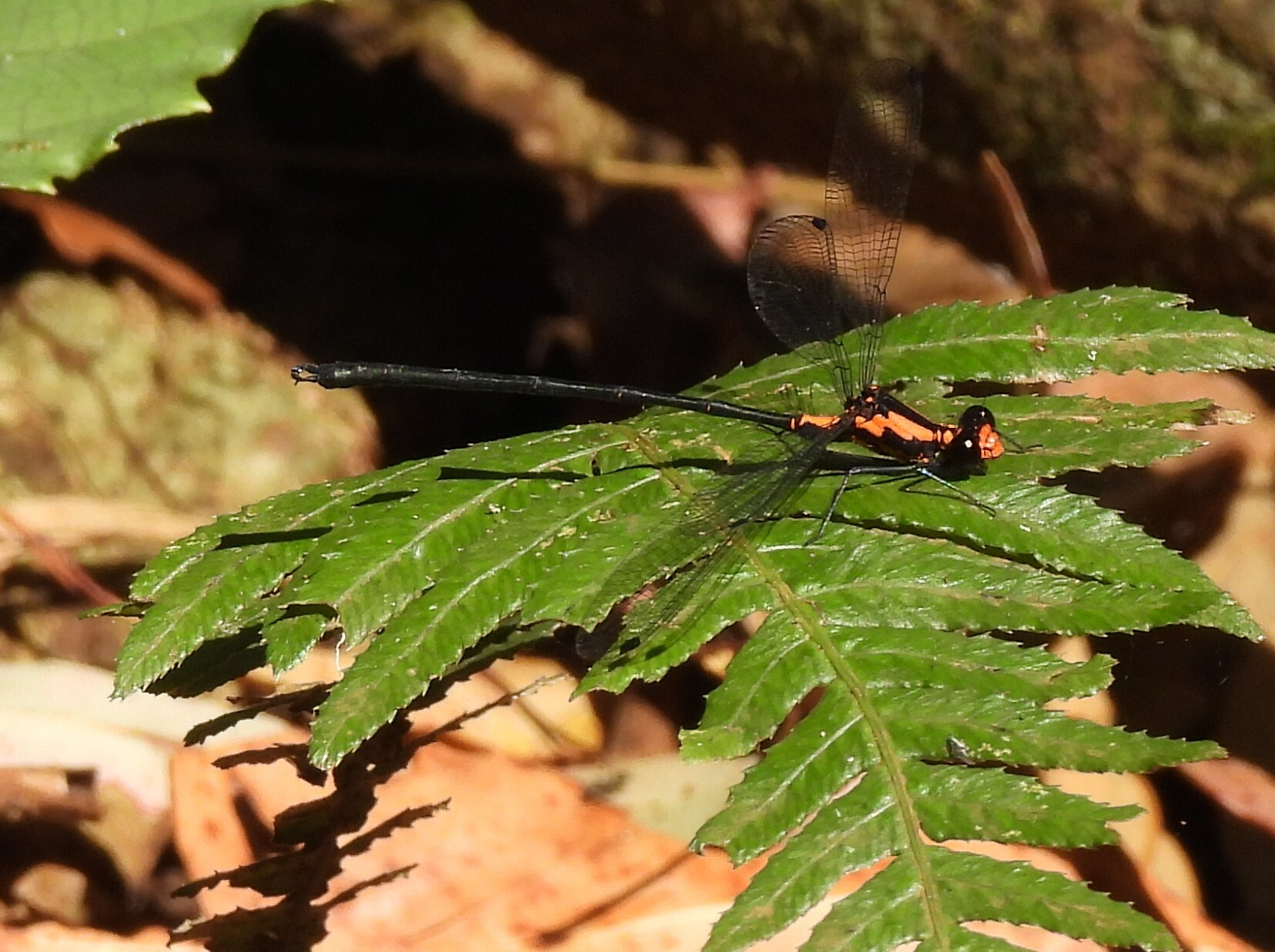
- Male
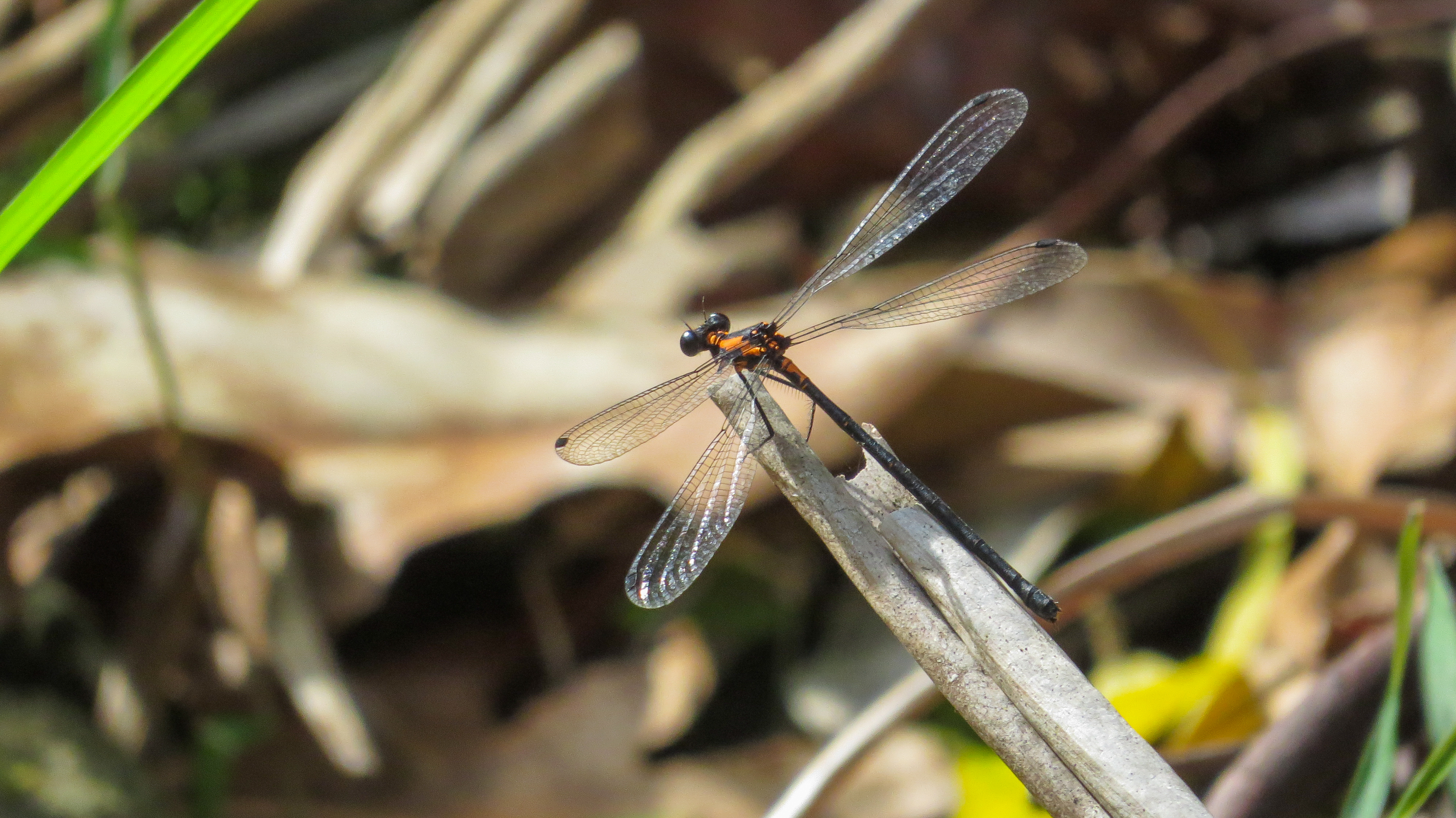
- Female

Conservation status
- Least Concern (IUCN 3.1)

Scientific classification
- Kingdom: Animalia
- Phylum: Arthropoda
- Clade: Pancrustacea
- Class: Insecta
- Order: Odonata
- Suborder: Zygoptera
- Family: Argiolestidae
- Genus: Austroargiolestes
- Species: A. amabilis

Binomial name
- Austroargiolestes amabilis (Förster, 1899)

Synonyms
- Argiolestes amabilis Förster, 1899

= Austroargiolestes amabilis =

Species of damselfly

Austroargiolestes amabilis is a species of Australian damselfly in the family Argiolestidae, commonly known as a flame flatwing. It is endemic to eastern Australia, where it inhabits streams in rainforest.

Austroargiolestes amabilis is a medium-sized to large, black and bright yellow-orange damselfly, without pruinescence. Like other members of the family Argiolestidae, it rests with its wings outspread.

== Etymology ==
The genus name Austroargiolestes combines the prefix austro- (from Latin auster, meaning “south wind”, hence “southern”) with Argiolestes, the name of a related genus. It refers to a southern representative of that group.

The species name amabilis is a Latin word meaning "lovely" or "likeable", and may refer to their colourful appearance.

== Gallery ==
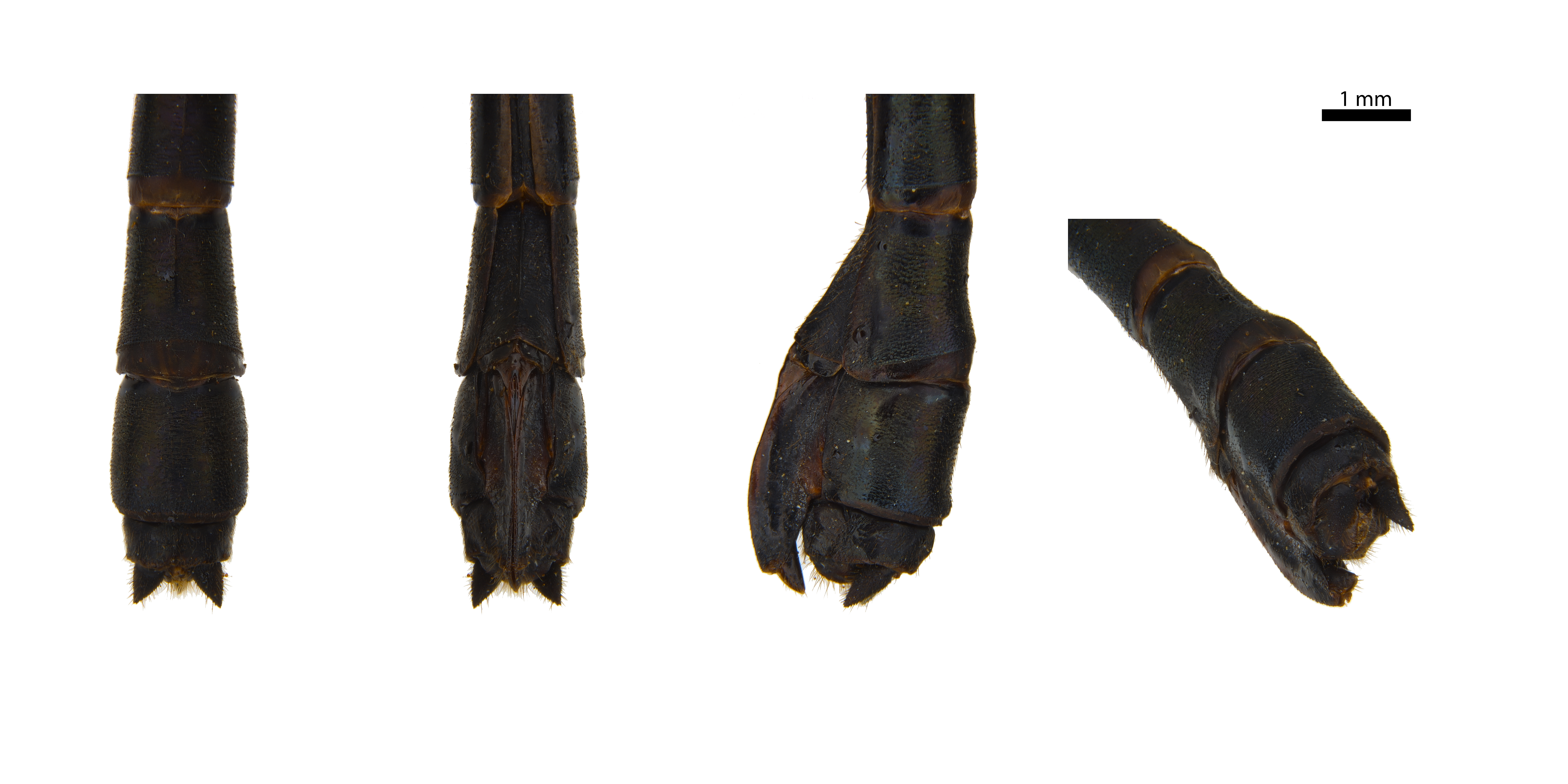
Tip of female tail

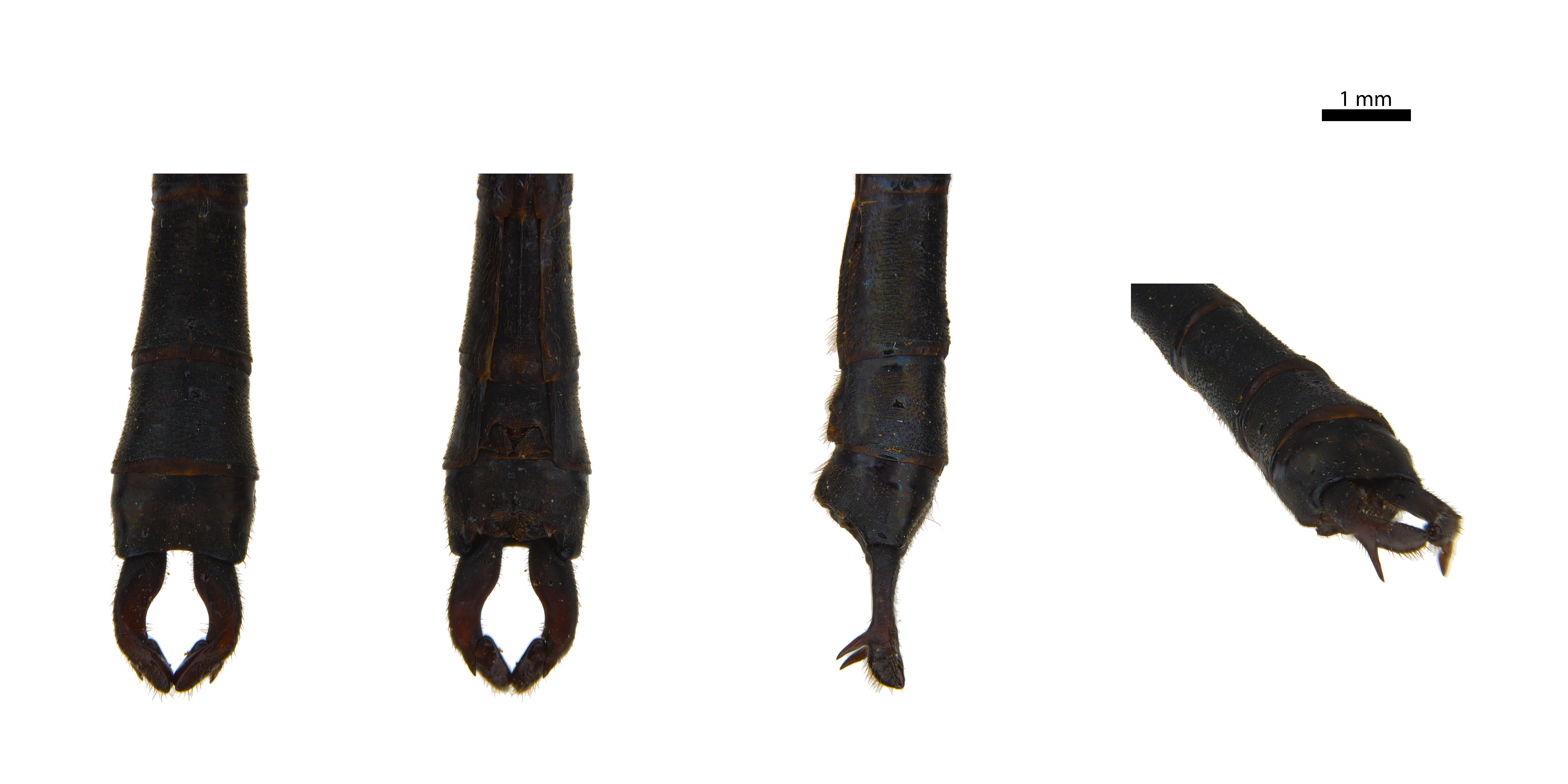
Tip of male tail

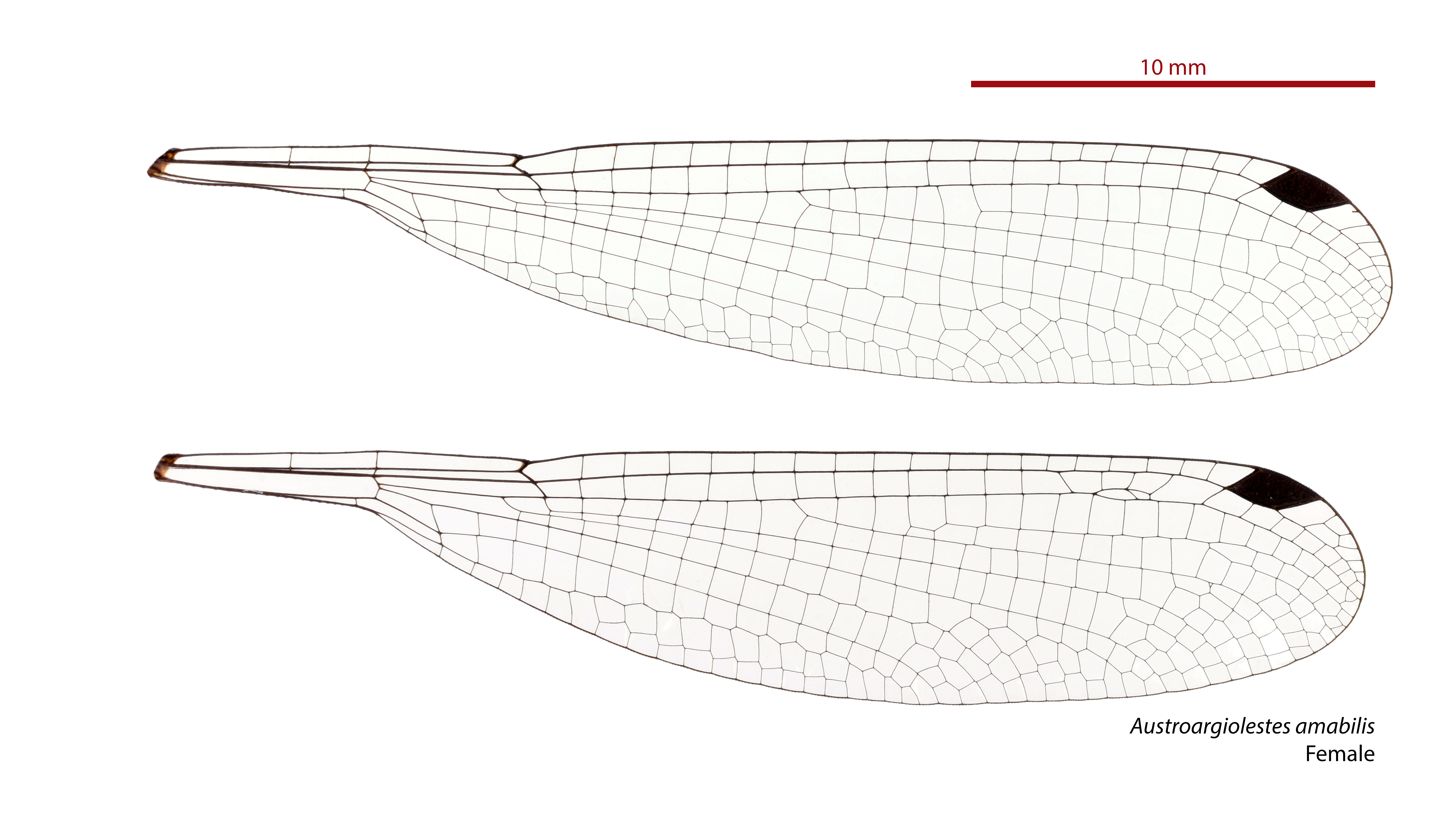
Female wings

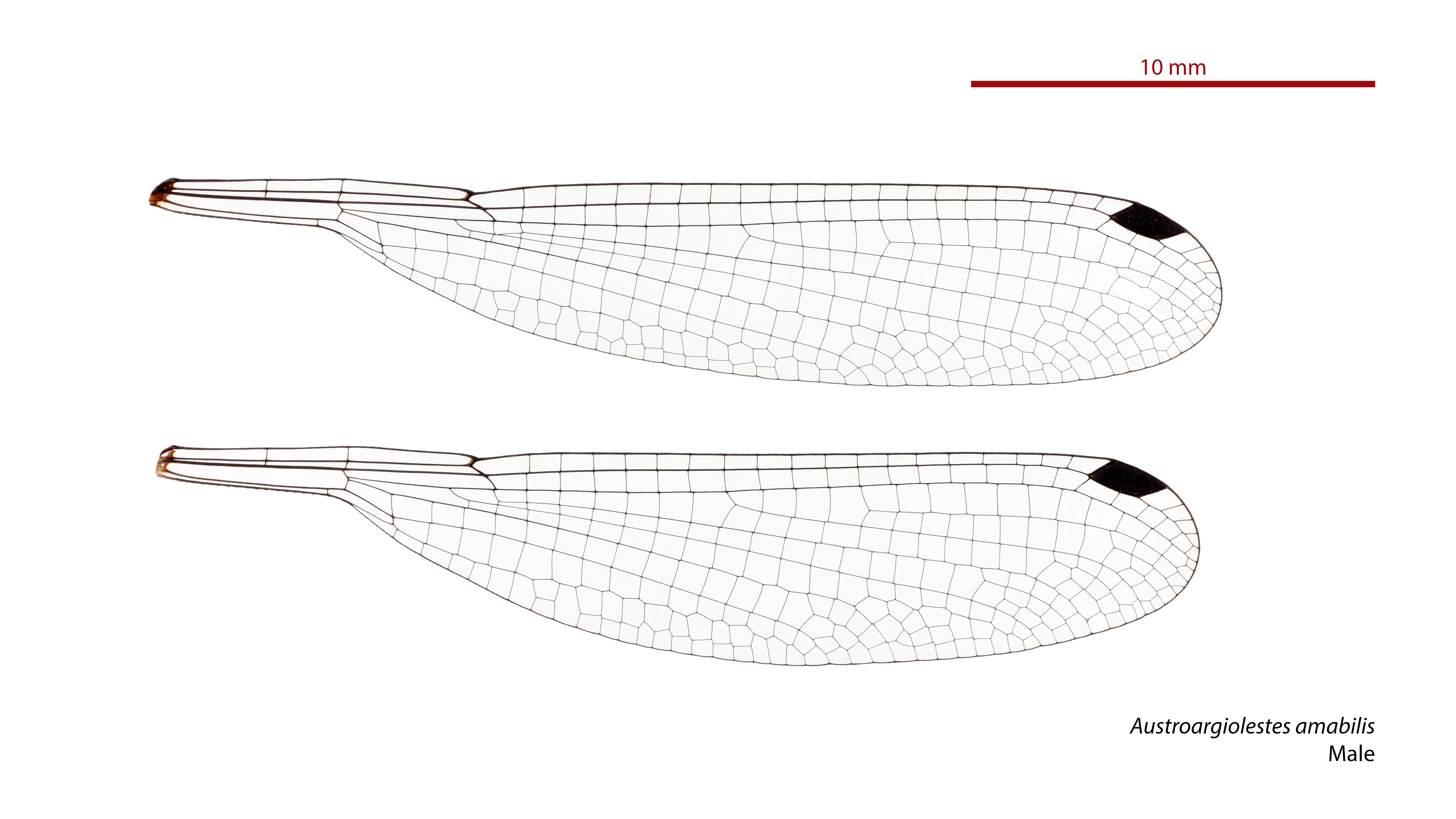
Male wings

== See also ==
- List of Odonata species of Australia
