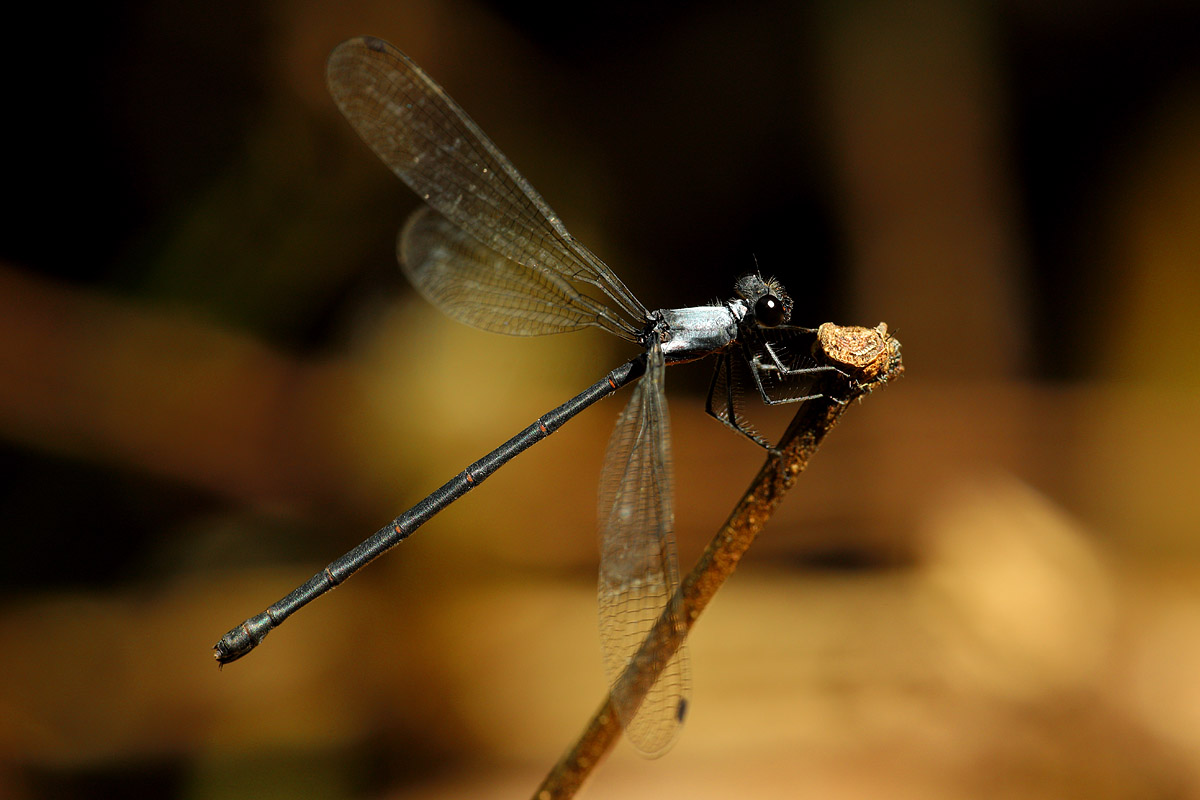
- Adult female

Conservation status
- Vulnerable (IUCN 3.1)

Scientific classification
- Kingdom: Animalia
- Phylum: Arthropoda
- Clade: Pancrustacea
- Class: Insecta
- Order: Odonata
- Suborder: Zygoptera
- Family: Argiolestidae
- Genus: Austroargiolestes
- Species: A. elke

Binomial name
- Austroargiolestes elke Theischinger & :O'Farrell, 1986

= Austroargiolestes elke =

Azure flatwing

Species of damselfly

Austroargiolestes elke is a species of Australian damselfly in the family Argiolestidae, commonly known as an azure flatwing. It is endemic to the vicinity of Eungella National Park in north-central Queensland, where it inhabits streams in rainforests.

Austroargiolestes elke is a medium-sized to large, black and blue damselfly, with strong pruinescence on adult bodies. Like other members of the family Argiolestidae, it rests with its wings outspread.

== Etymology ==
The genus name Austroargiolestes combines the prefix austro- (from Latin auster, meaning “south wind”, hence “southern”) with Argiolestes, the name of a related genus. It refers to a southern representative of that group.

In 1986, Günther Theischinger and Tony O'Farrell named this species elke, an eponym honouring the collector’s wife, Elke Müller.

== Gallery ==
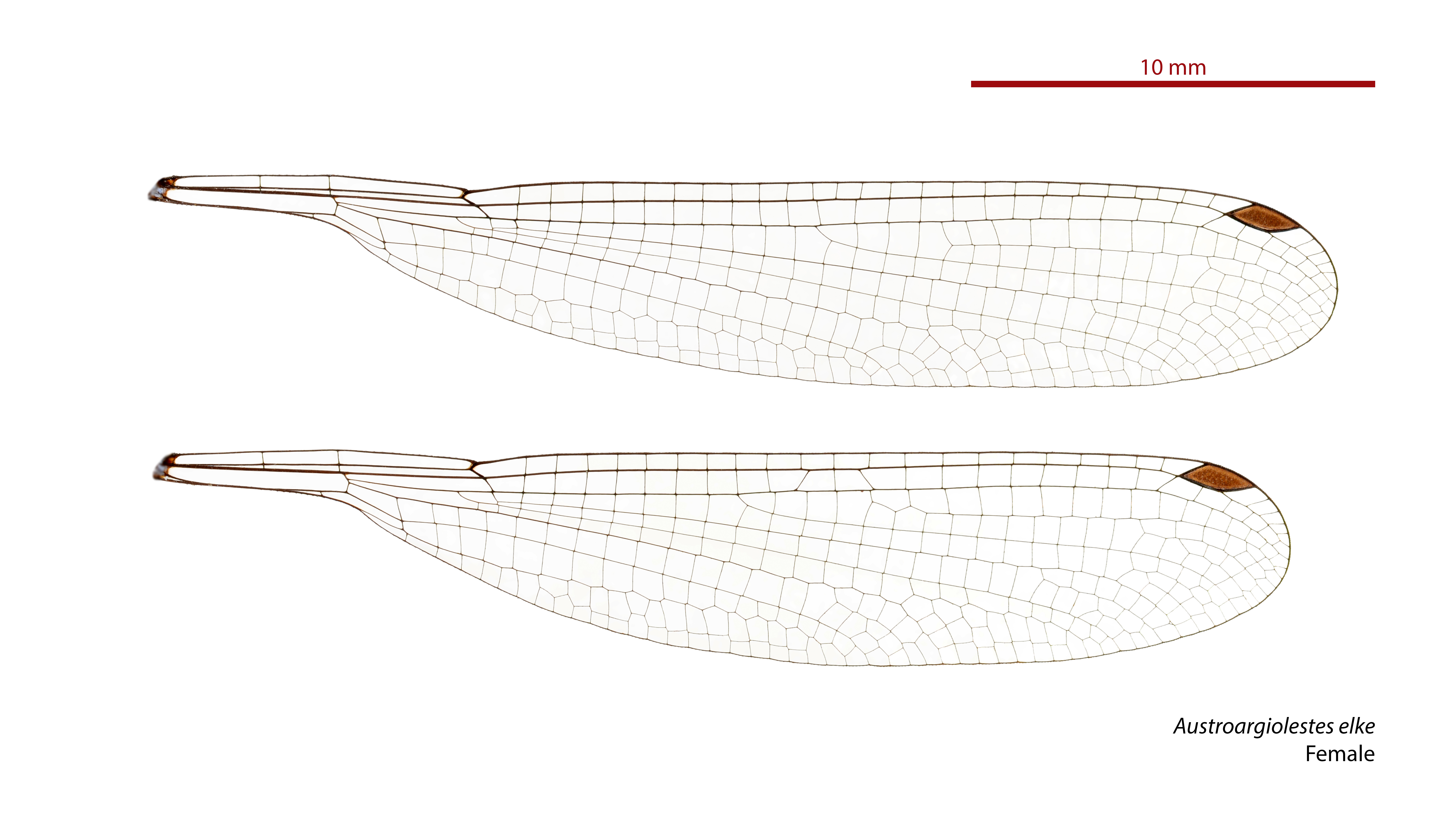
Female wings

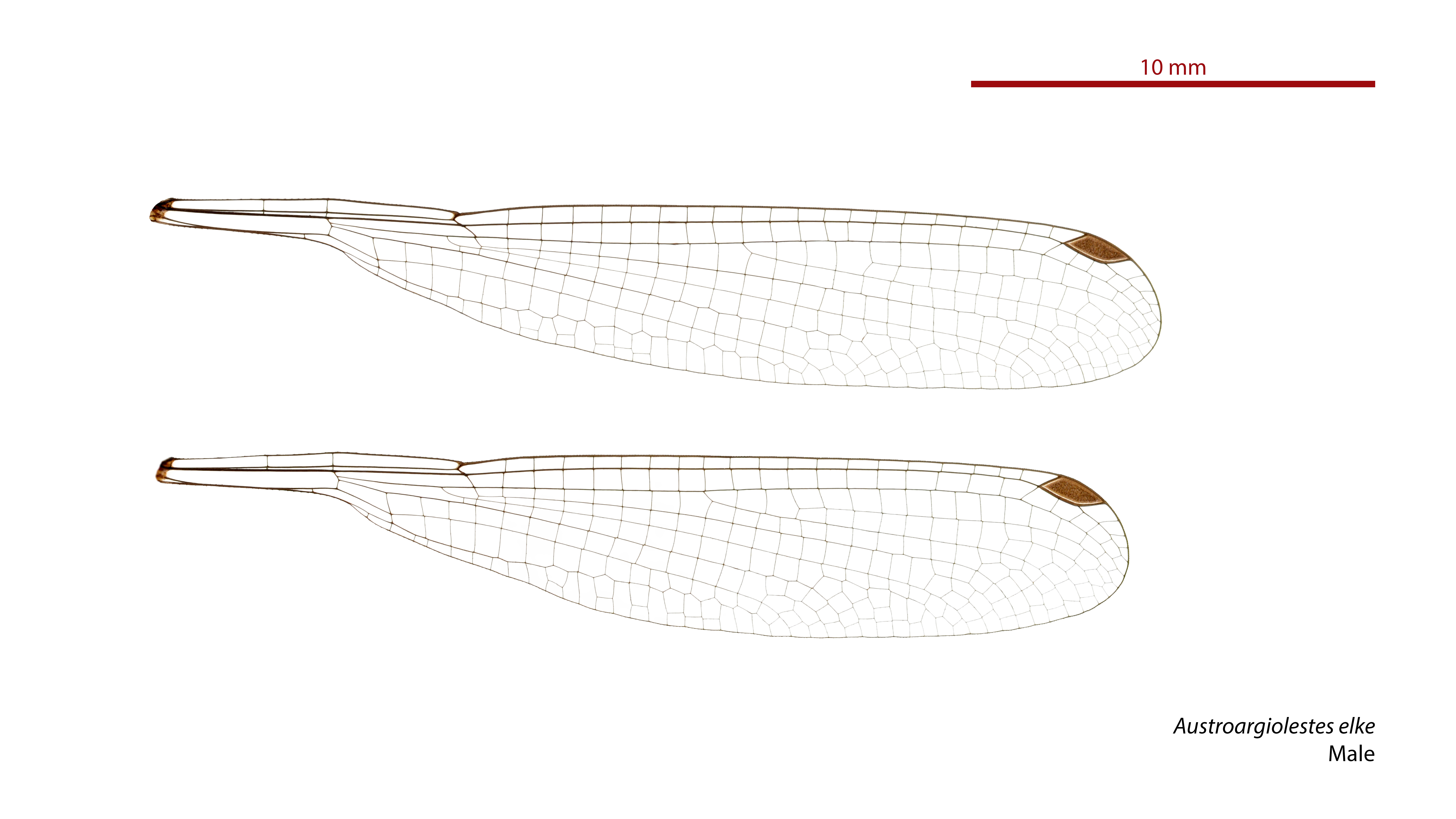
Male wings

== See also ==
- List of Odonata species of Australia
