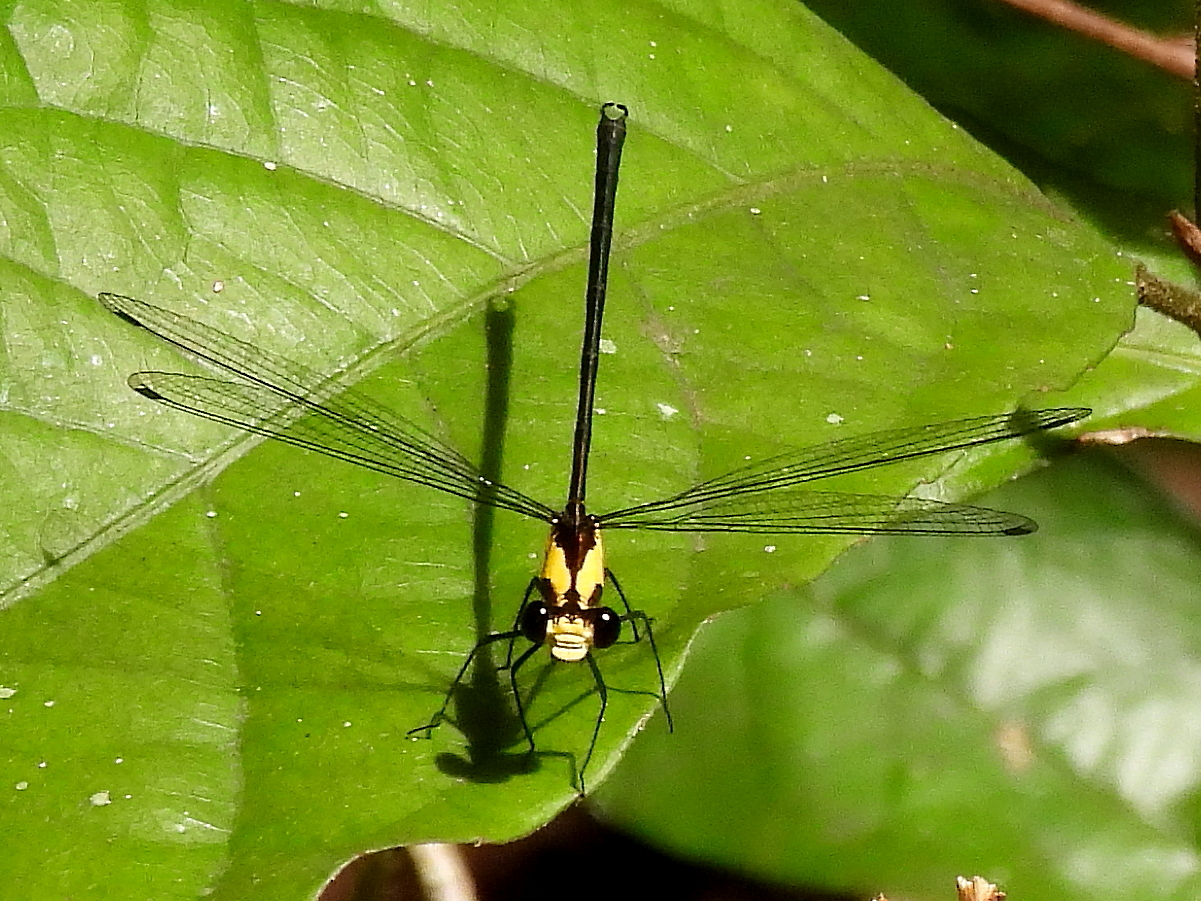
- Male, Mount Lewis, Queensland

Conservation status
- Least Concern (IUCN 3.1)

Scientific classification
- Kingdom: Animalia
- Phylum: Arthropoda
- Clade: Pancrustacea
- Class: Insecta
- Order: Odonata
- Suborder: Zygoptera
- Family: Argiolestidae
- Genus: Austroargiolestes
- Species: A. aureus

Binomial name
- Austroargiolestes aureus (Tillyard, 1906)

Synonyms
- Argiolestes aureus Tillyard, 1906

= Austroargiolestes aureus =

Tropical flatwing

Species of damselfly

Austroargiolestes aureus is a species of Australian damselfly in the family Argiolestidae, commonly known as a tropical flatwing. It is endemic to north-eastern Queensland, where it inhabits streams in rainforest.

Austroargiolestes aureus is a medium-sized to large, black and yellow damselfly, without pruinescence. Like other members of the family Argiolestidae, it rests with its wings outspread.

== Etymology ==
The genus name Austroargiolestes combines the prefix austro- (from Latin auster, meaning “south wind”, hence “southern”) with Argiolestes, the name of a related genus. It refers to a southern representative of that group.

The species name aureus is a Latin word meaning "adorned with gold, golden", referring to the species’ "brilliant orange thorax".

== Gallery ==
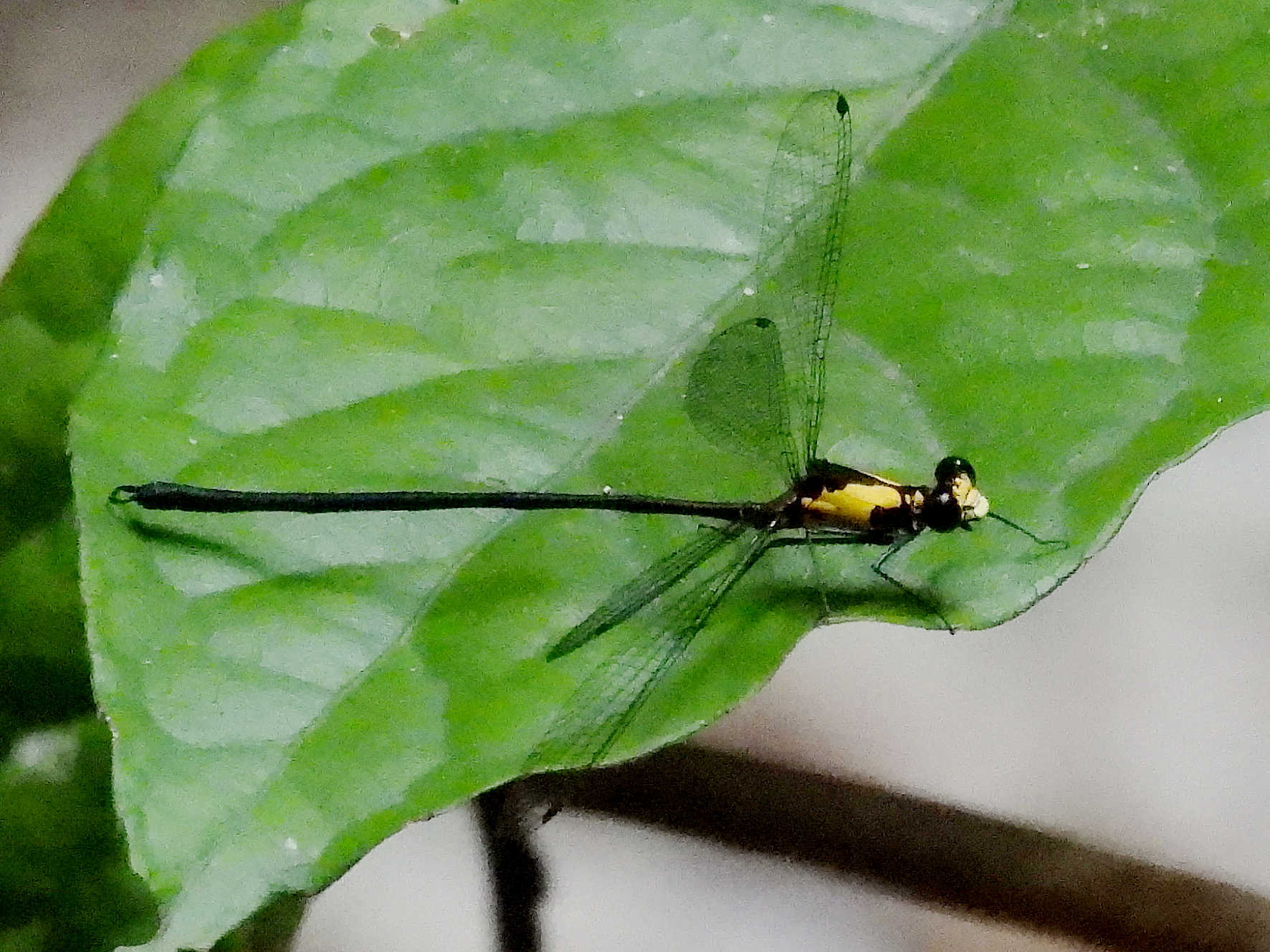
male, side

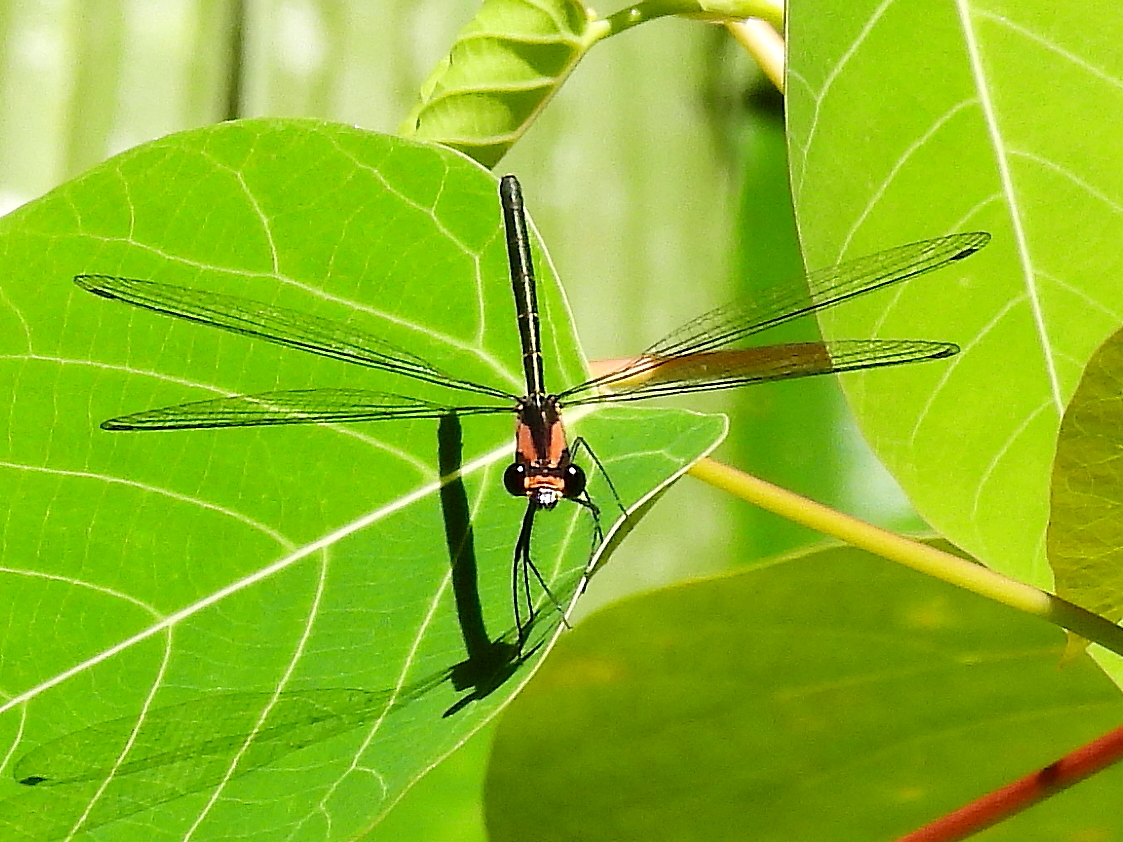
female, face on

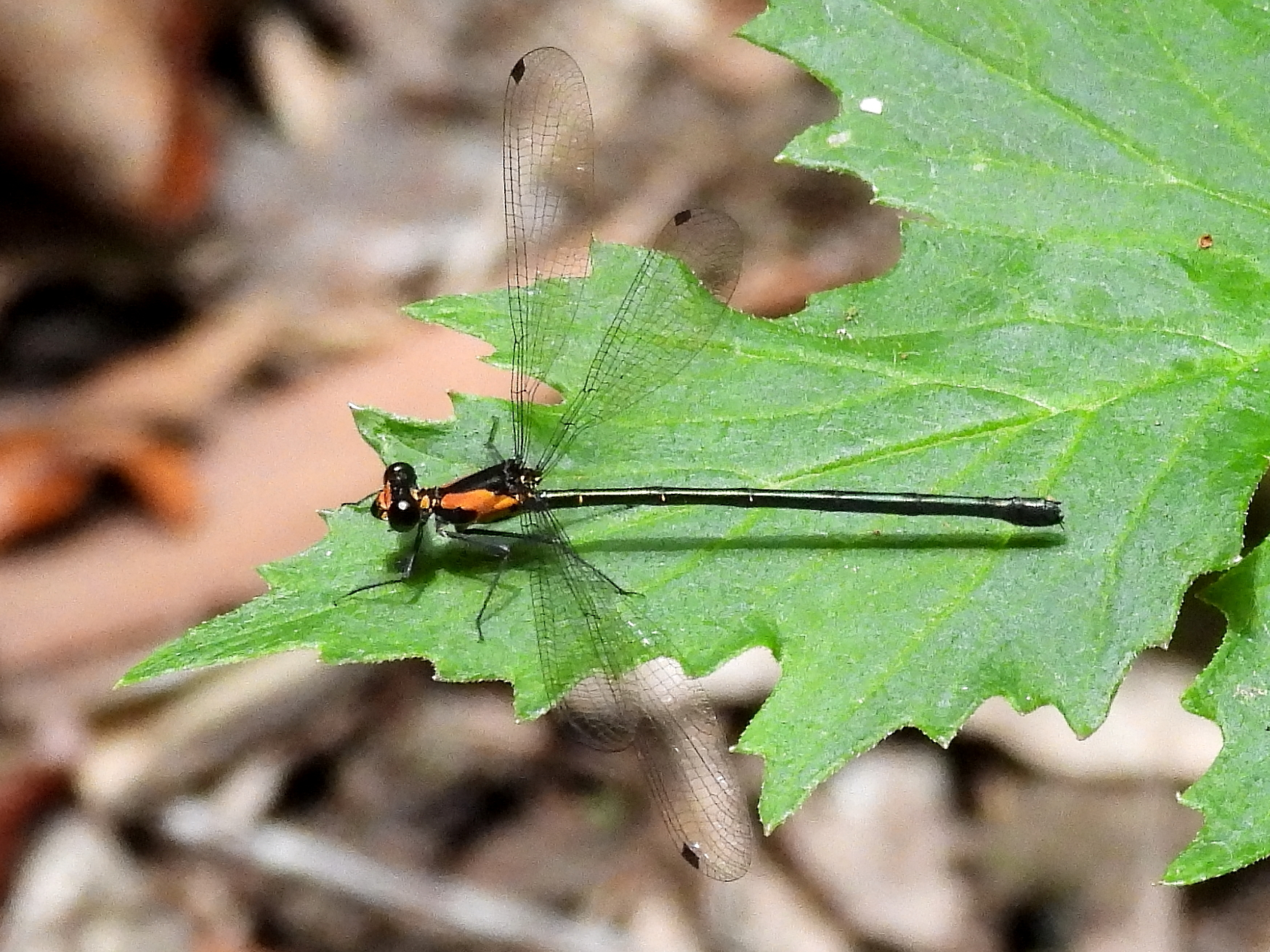
female, side

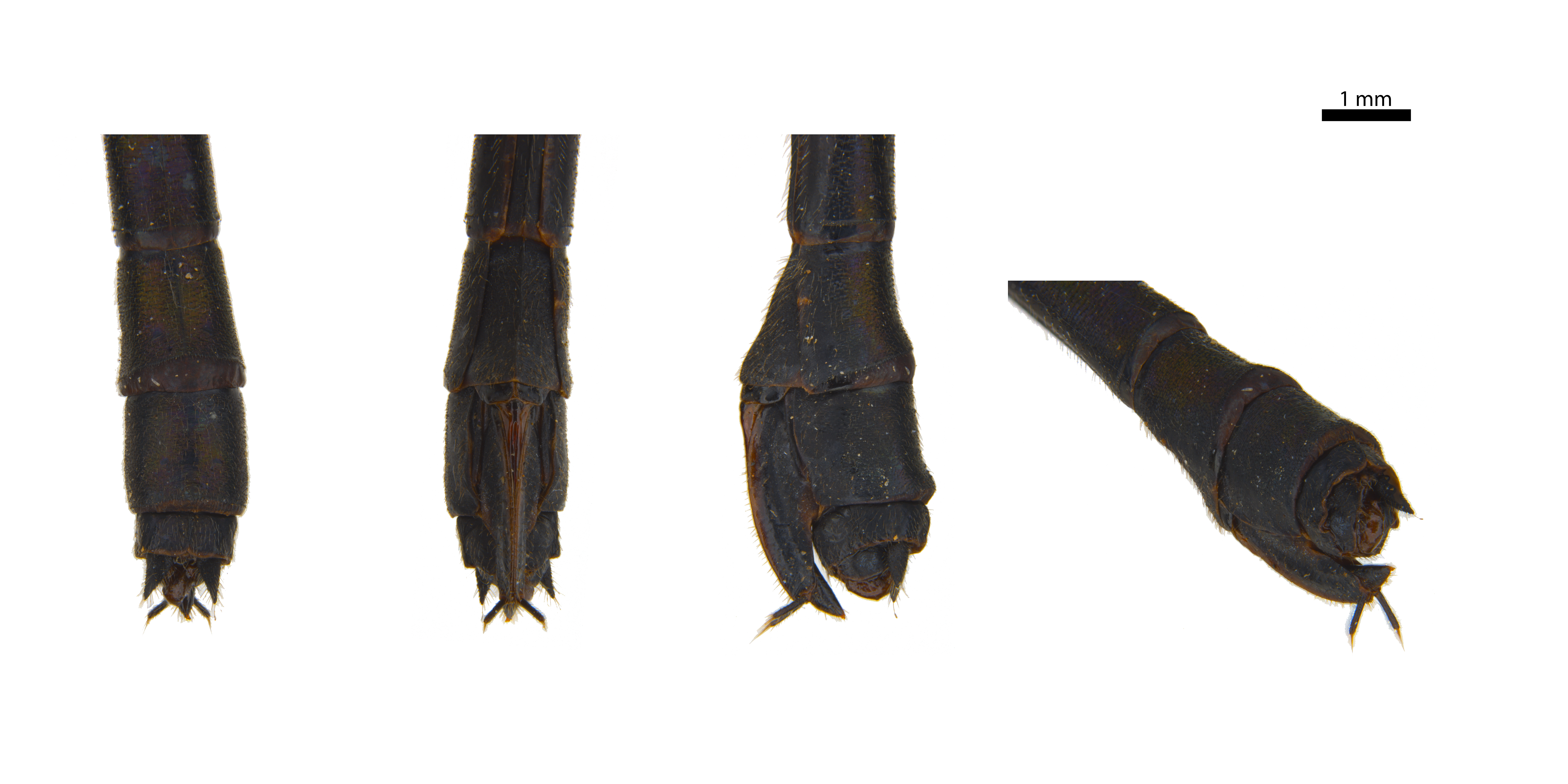
Tip of female tail

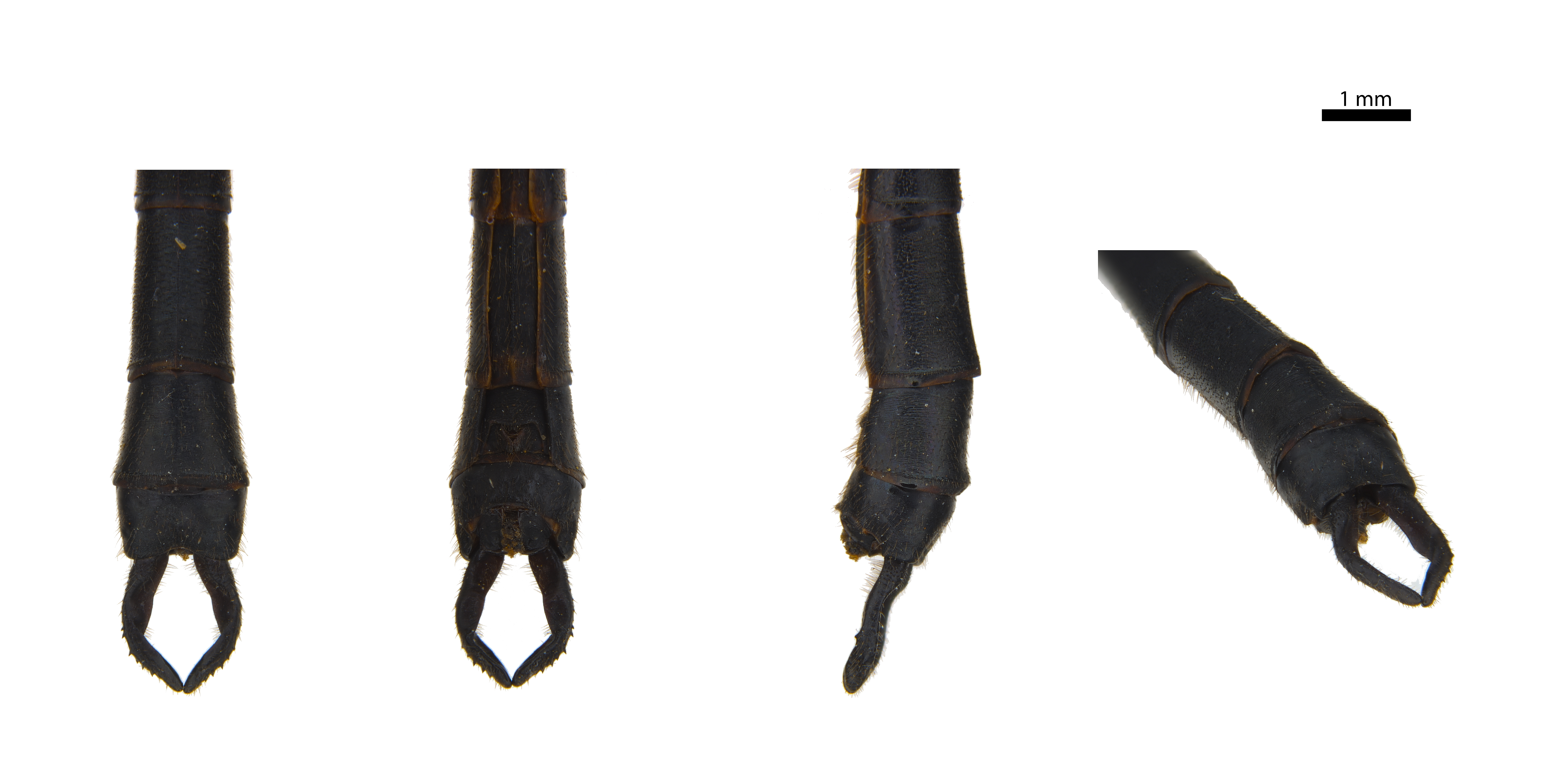
Tip of male tail

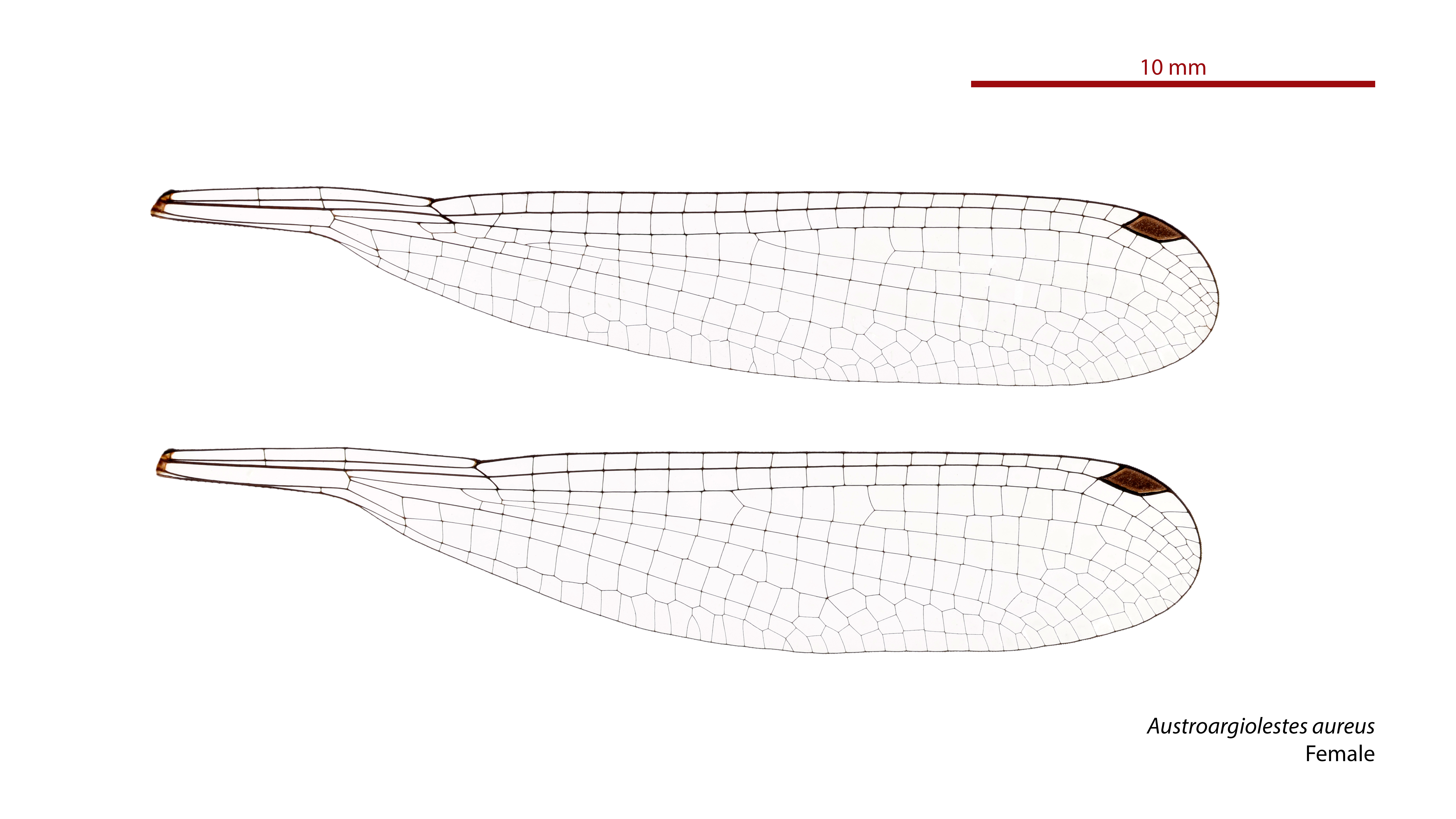
Female wings

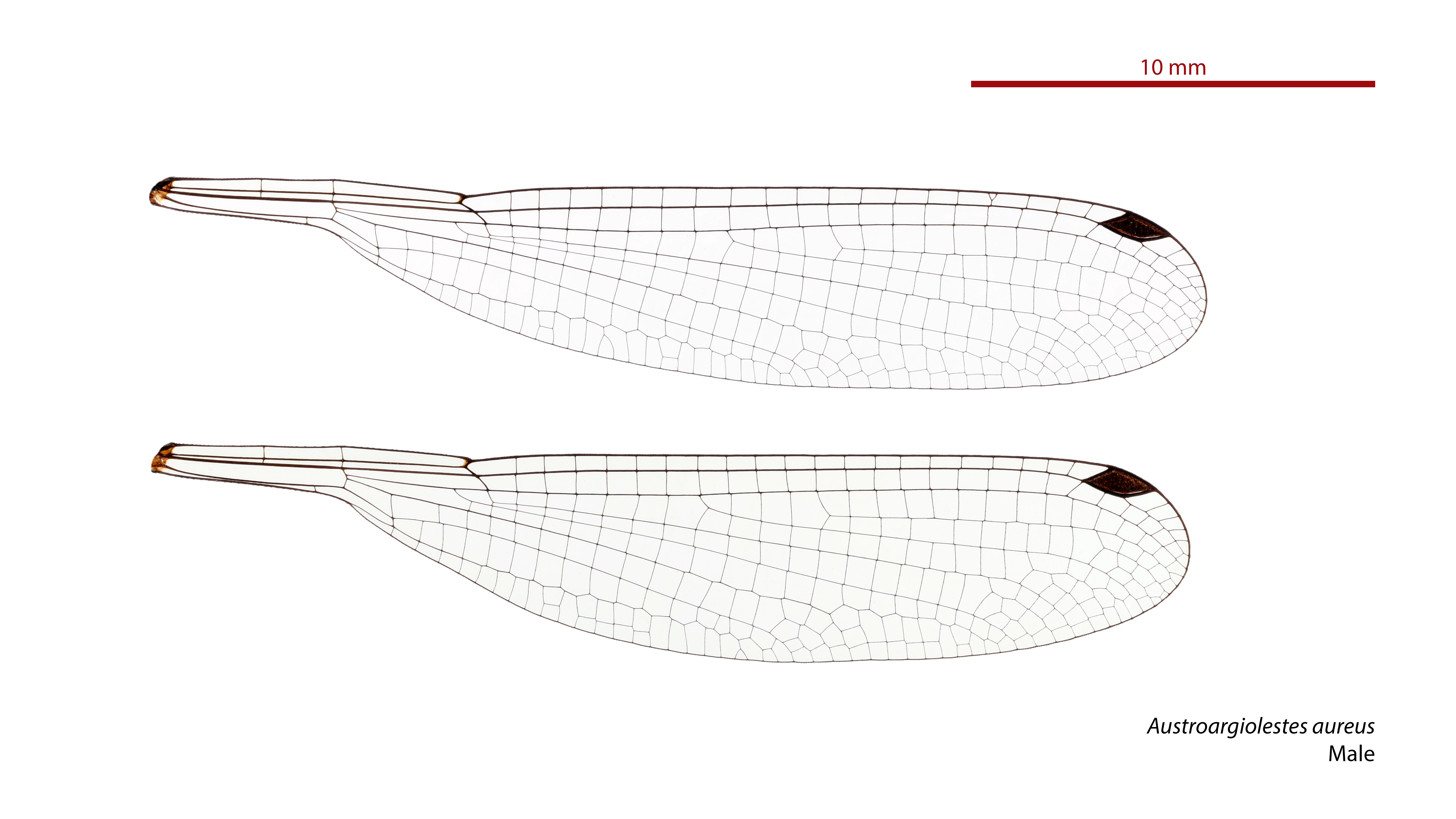
Male wings

== See also ==
- List of Odonata species of Australia
