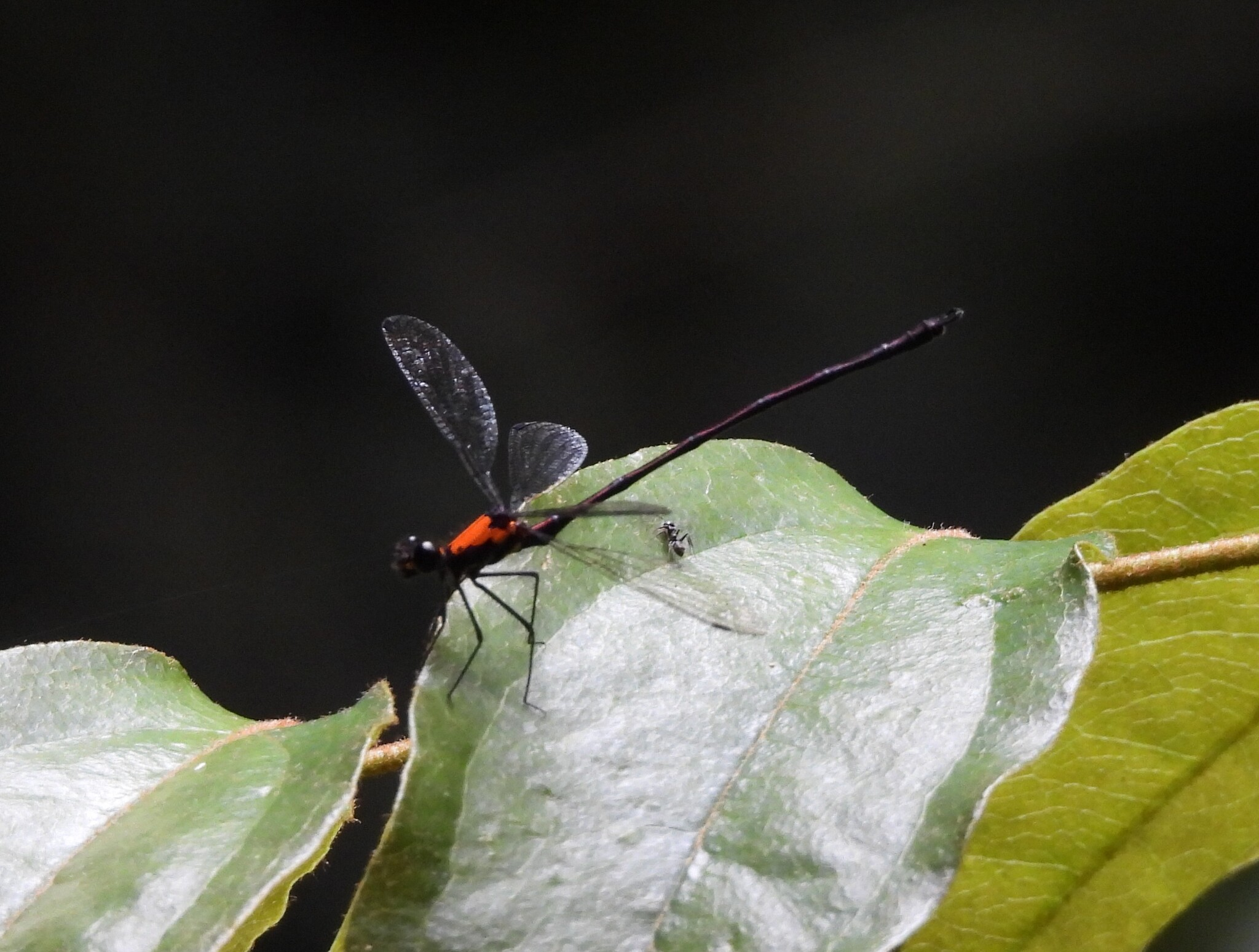
- Male
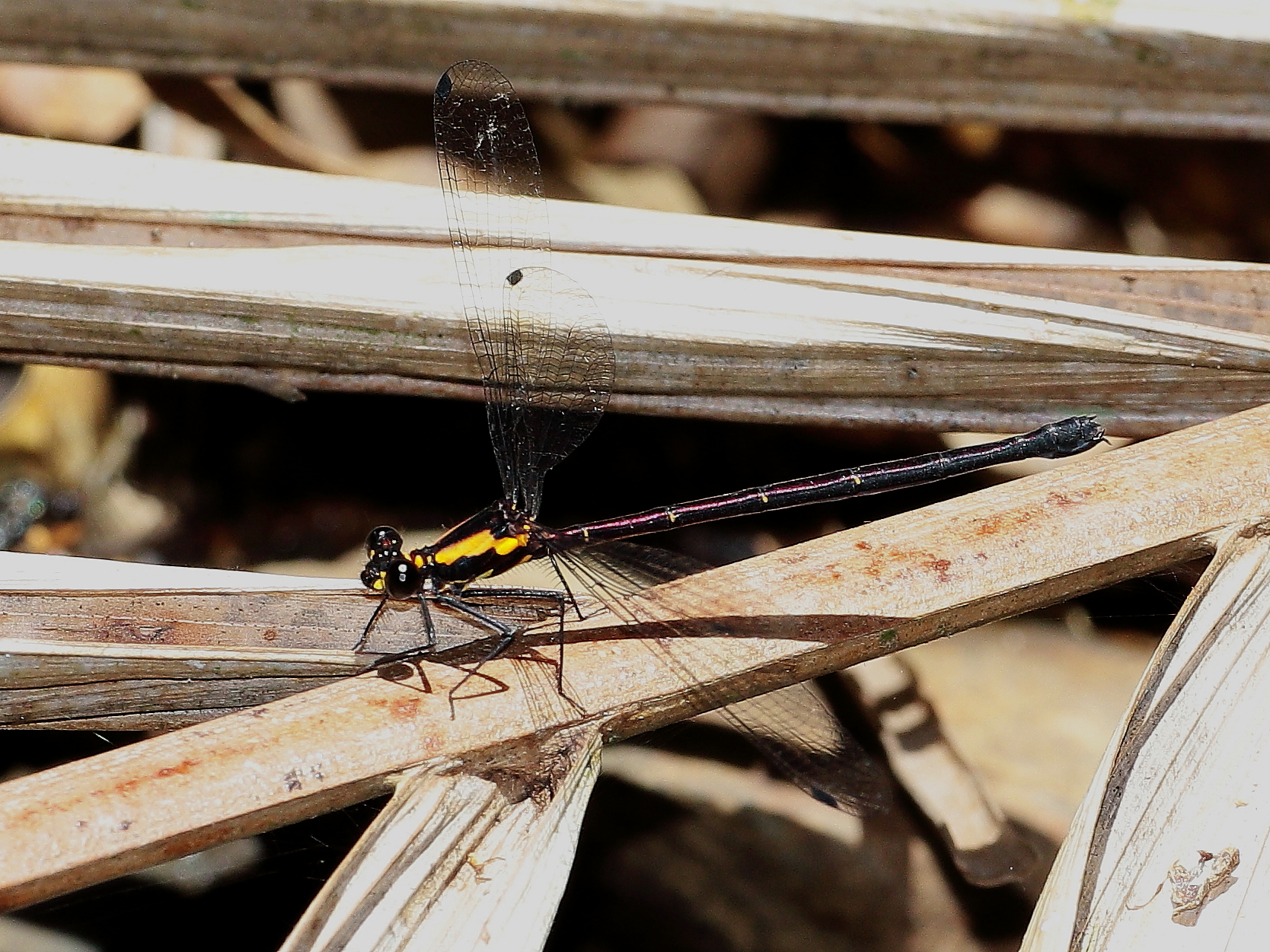
- Female

Conservation status
- Least Concern (IUCN 3.1)

Scientific classification
- Kingdom: Animalia
- Phylum: Arthropoda
- Clade: Pancrustacea
- Class: Insecta
- Order: Odonata
- Suborder: Zygoptera
- Family: Argiolestidae
- Genus: Austroargiolestes
- Species: A. chrysoides

Binomial name
- Austroargiolestes chrysoides (Tillyard, 1913)

Synonyms
- Argiolestes chrysoides Tillyard, 1913

= Austroargiolestes chrysoides =

Golden flatwing

Species of damselfly

Austroargiolestes chrysoides is a species of Australian damselfly in the family Argiolestidae, commonly known as a golden flatwing. It is endemic to south-eastern Queensland, where it inhabits streams in rainforest.

Austroargiolestes chrysoides is a medium-sized to large, black and yellow damselfly, without pruinescence. Like other members of the family Argiolestidae, it rests with its wings outspread.

== Etymology ==
The genus name Austroargiolestes combines the prefix austro- (from Latin auster, meaning “south wind”, hence “southern”) with Argiolestes, the name of a related genus. It refers to a southern representative of that group.

The species name chrysoides is derived from Greek χρυσός (chrysos, "gold") and -ειδής (-eidēs, "like"), referring to the golden colour of the thorax.

== Gallery ==
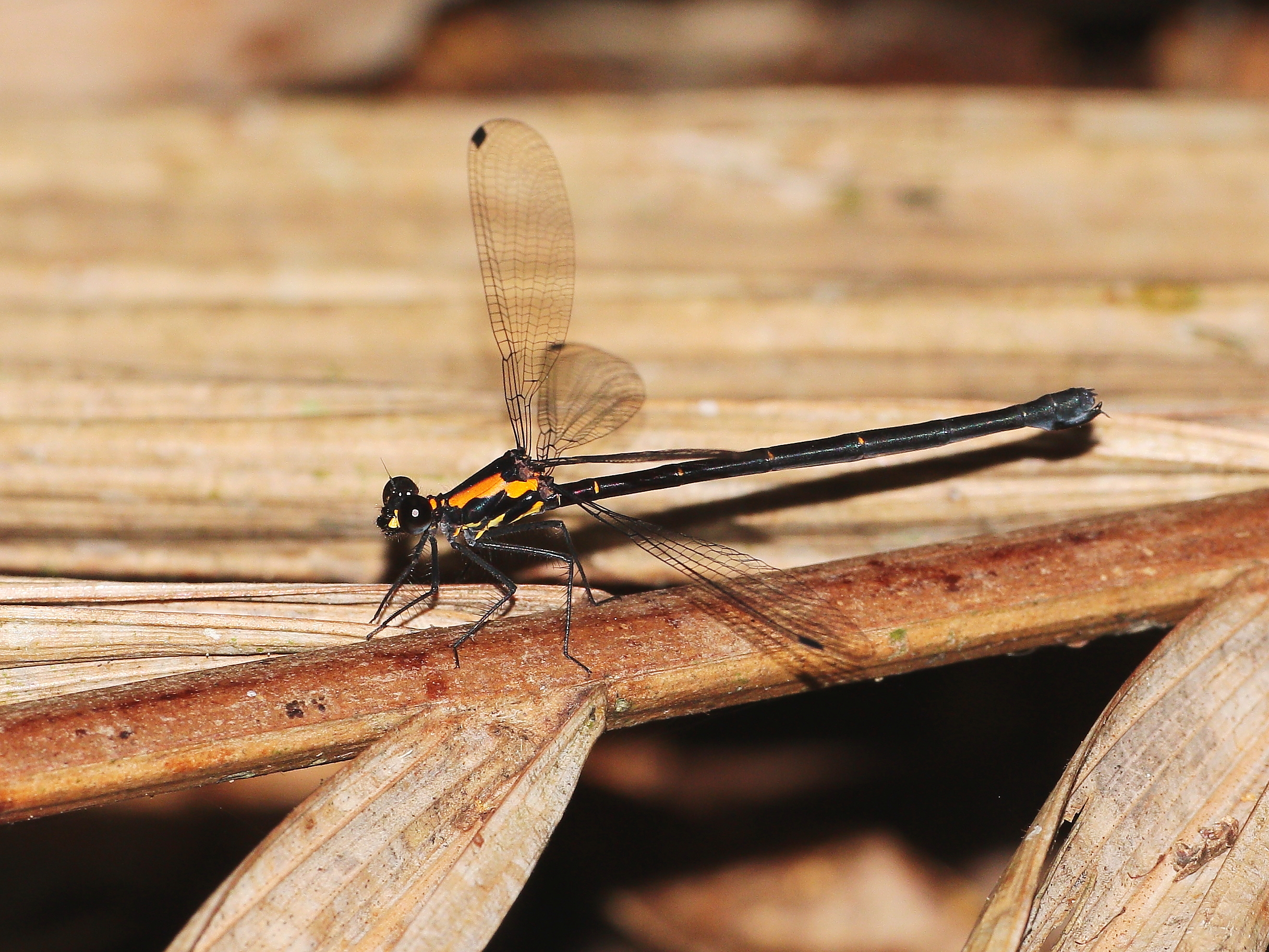
female, Mt. Glorius, Queensland, Australia

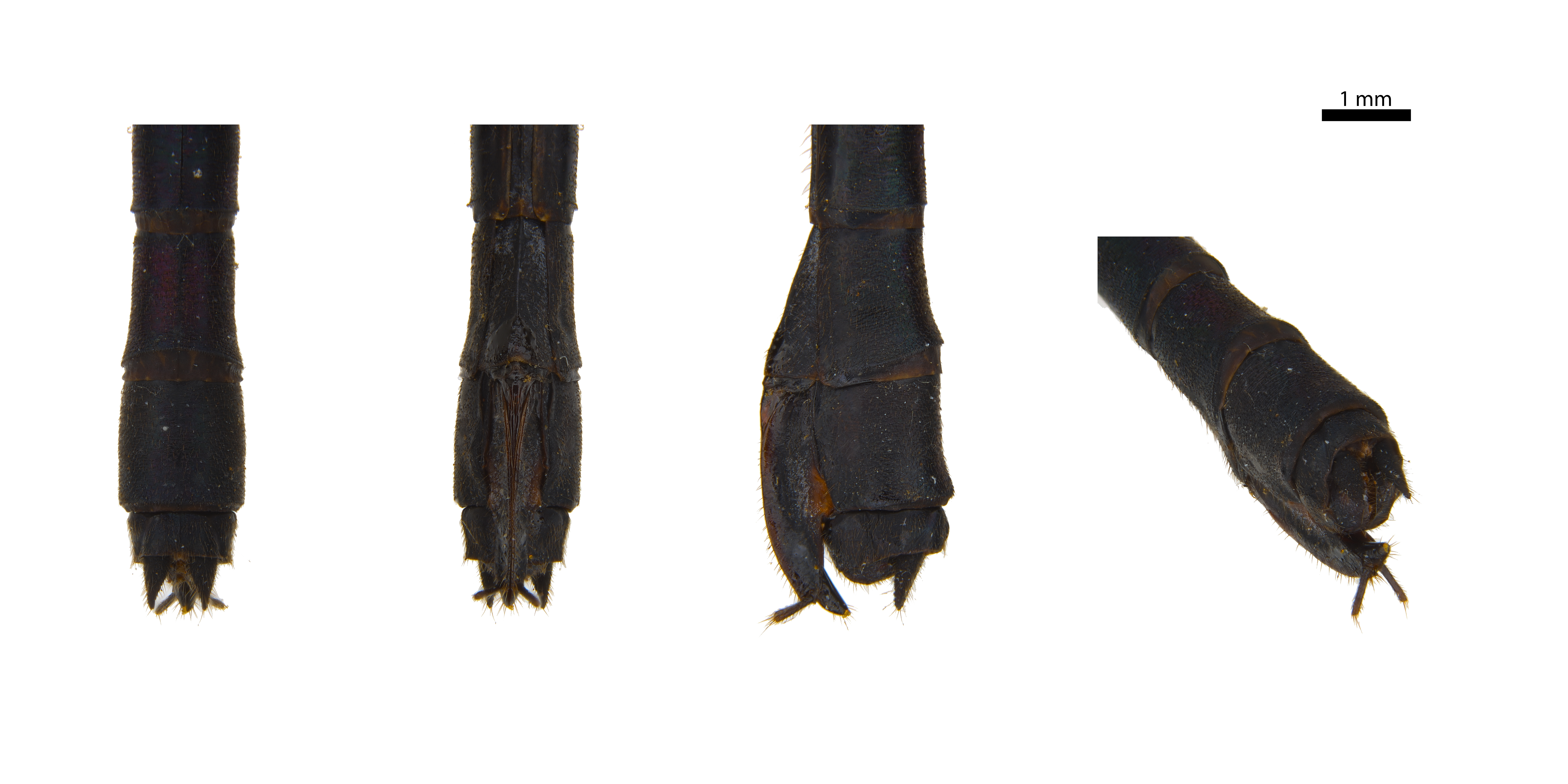
Tip of female tail

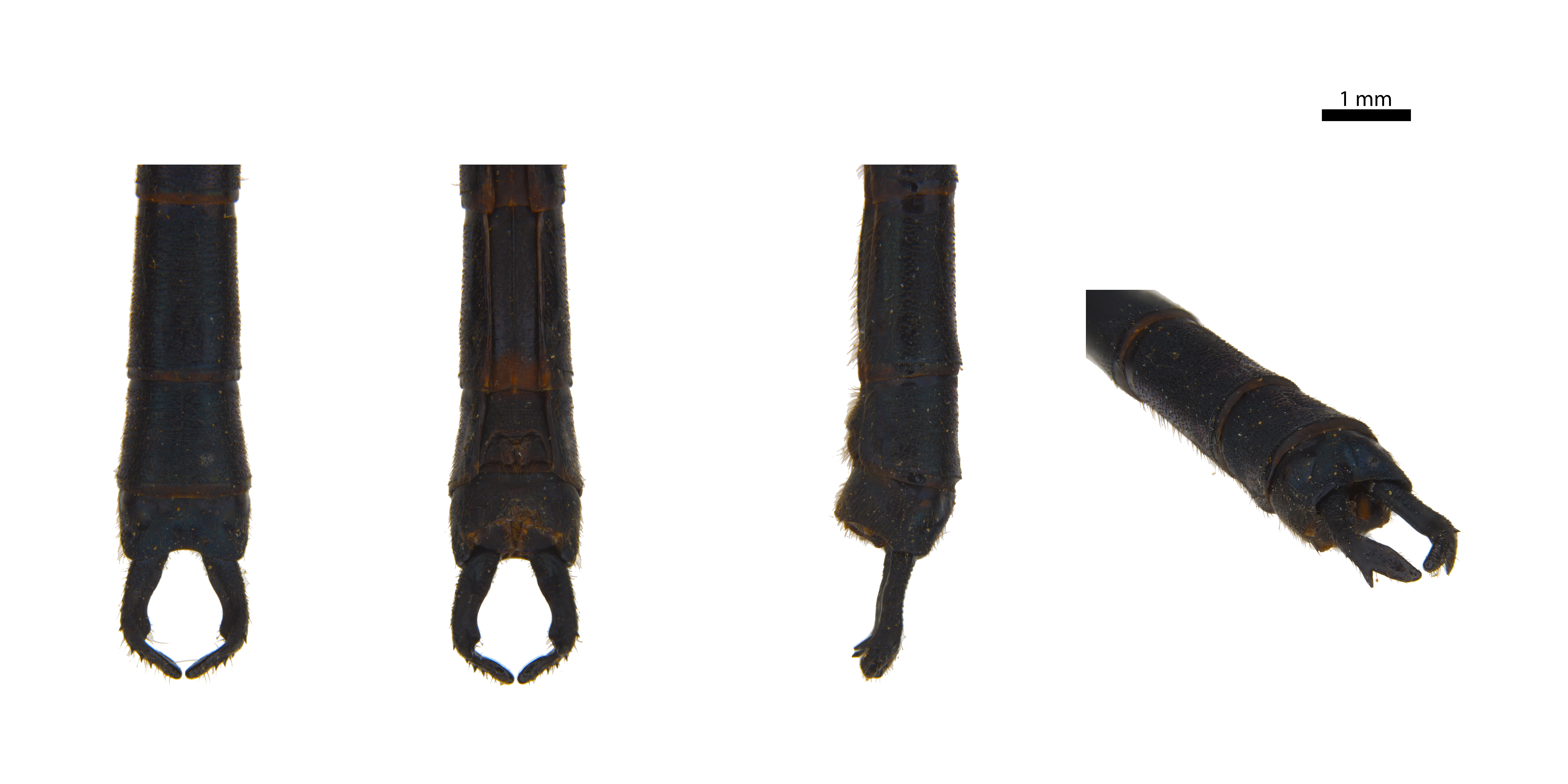
Tip of male tail

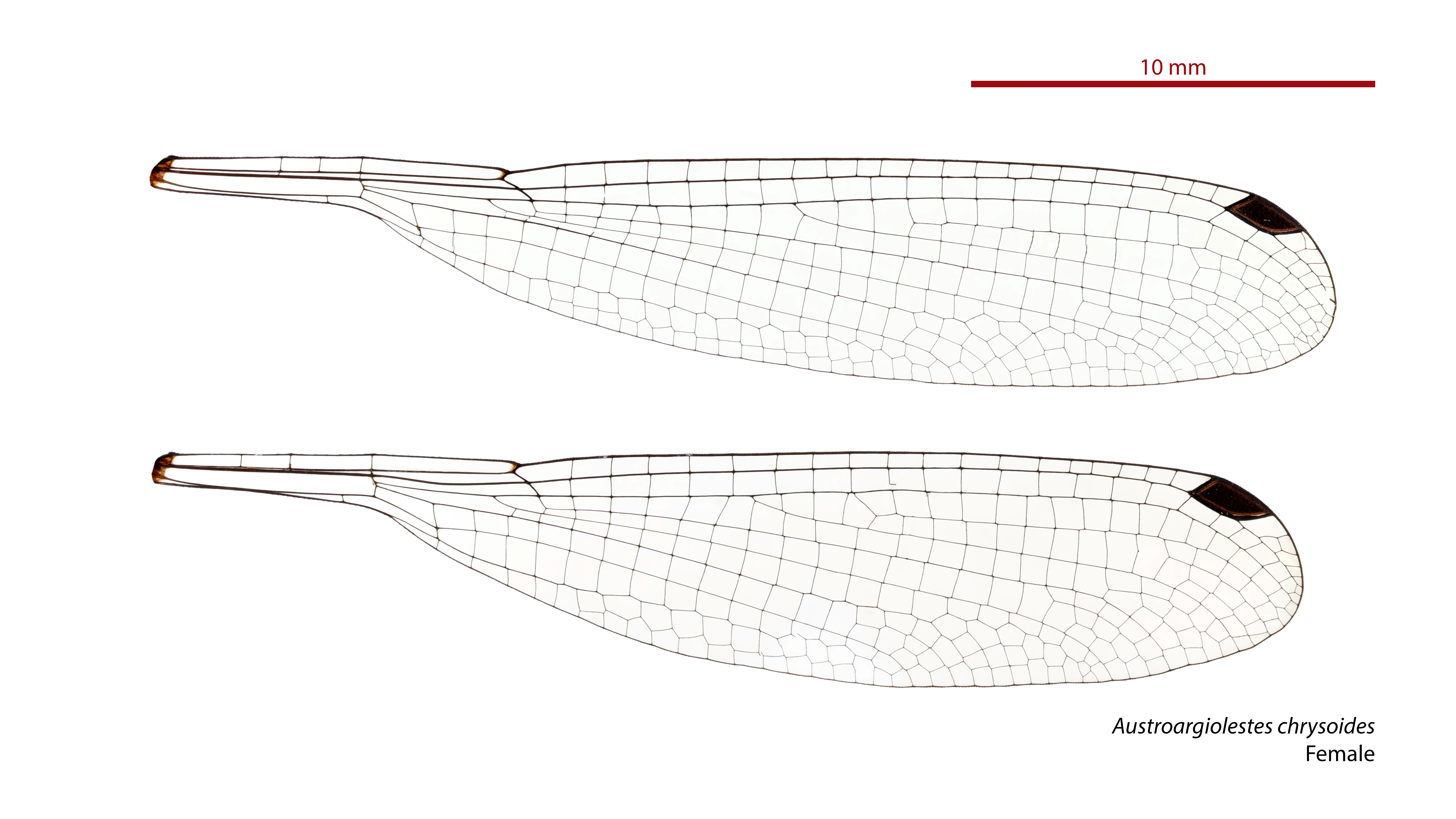
Female wings

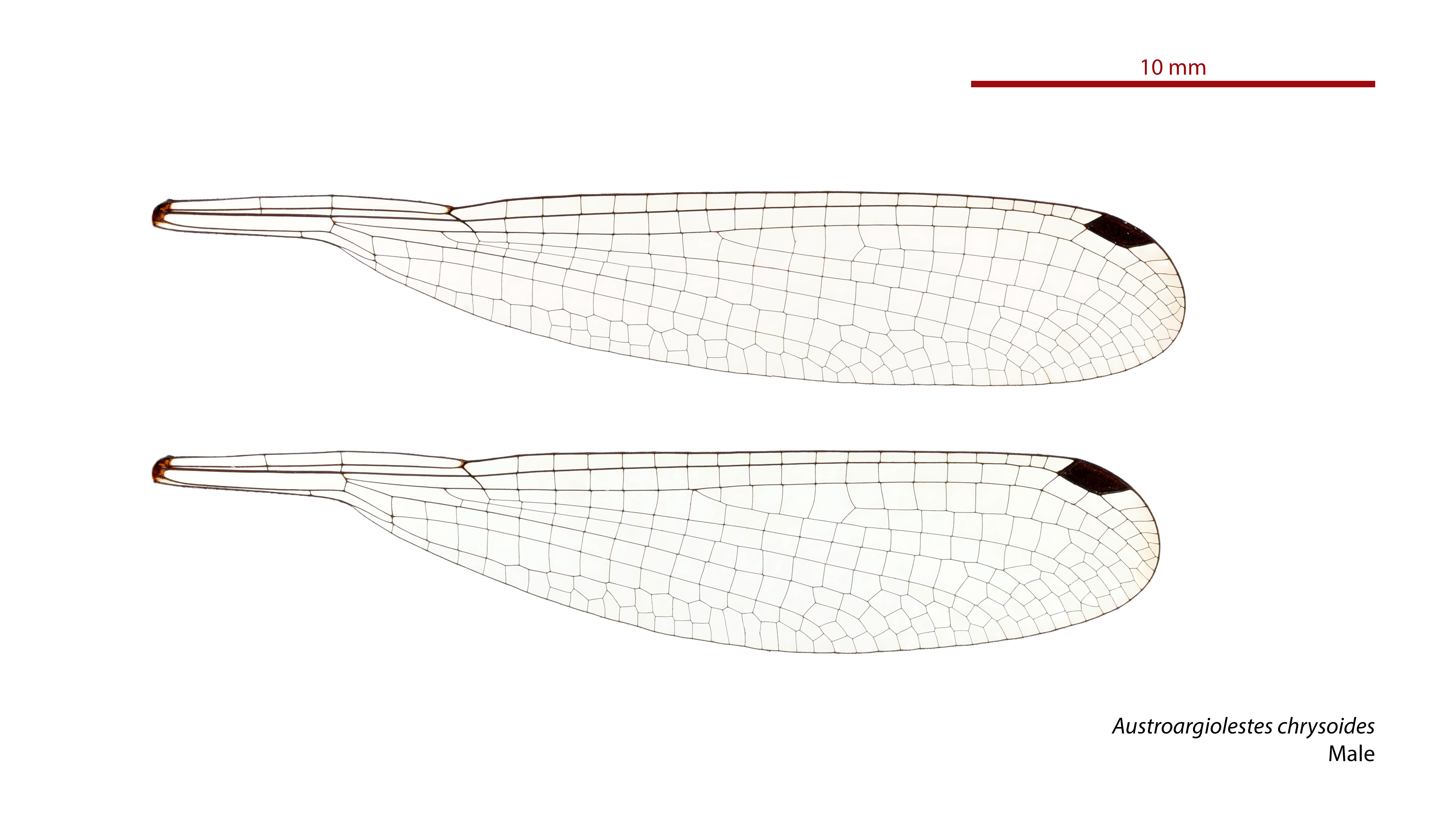
Male wings

== See also ==
- List of Odonata species of Australia
