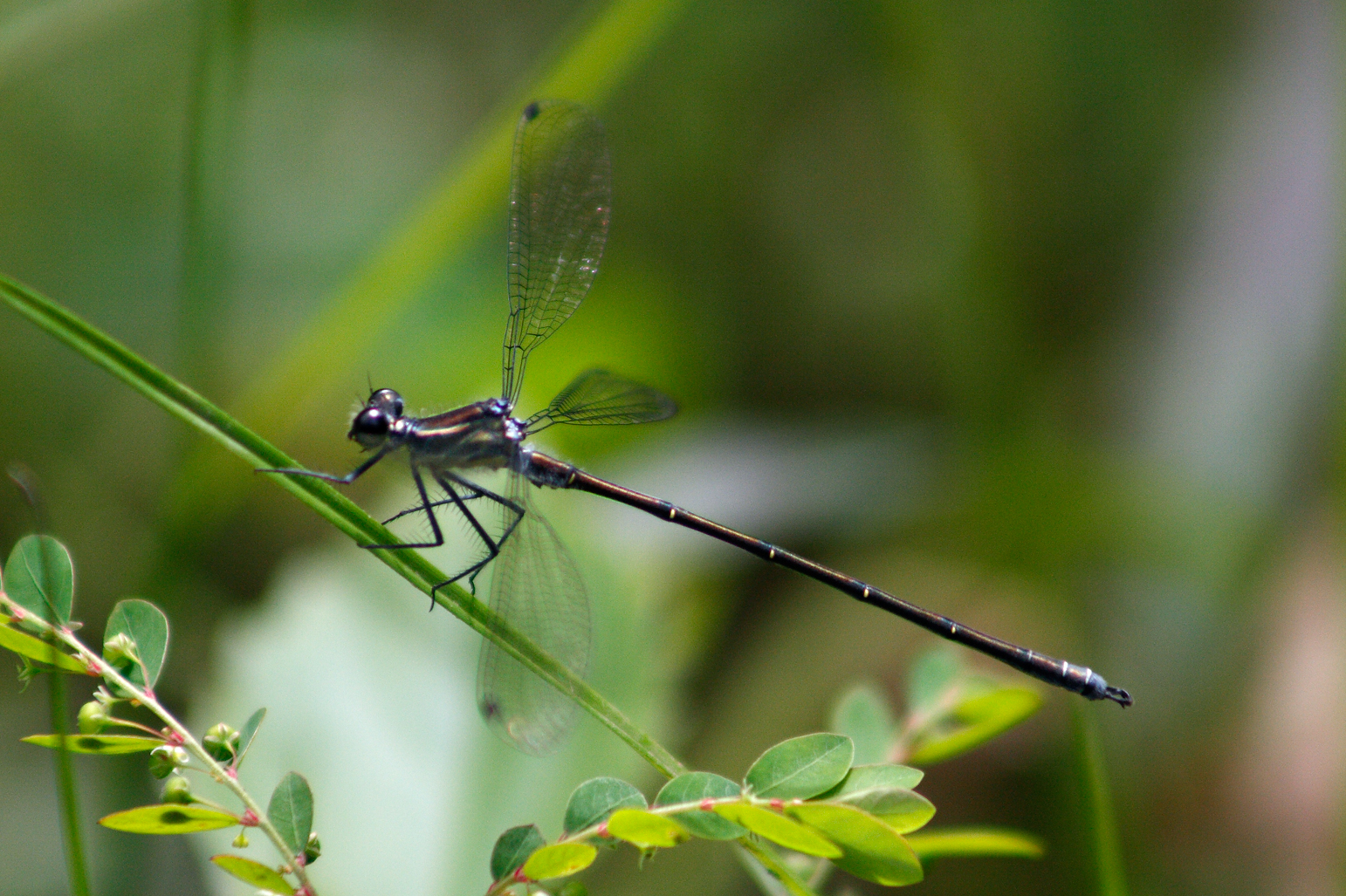
- Common Flatwing

Scientific classification
- Kingdom: Animalia
- Phylum: Arthropoda
- Clade: Pancrustacea
- Class: Insecta
- Order: Odonata
- Suborder: Zygoptera
- Family: Argiolestidae
- Genus: Austroargiolestes; Kennedy, 1925

= Austroargiolestes =

Flatwings

Genus of damselflies

Austroargiolestes is a genus of damselflies in the family Argiolestidae. They are commonly known as Flatwings; unlike many other damselflies, at rest their wings are spread out flat.

They are medium-sized dragonflies with bronze-black colouring and pale markings. Species of Austroargiolestes are endemic to eastern Australia.

== Etymology ==
The genus name Austroargiolestes combines the prefix austro- (from Latin auster, meaning “south wind”, hence “southern”) with Argiolestes, the name of a related genus. It refers to a southern representative of that group.

In 1925, Clarence Hamilton Kennedy established Austroargiolestes to "include Argiolestes icteromelas ... and other Australian species" having some similar physical characters of wings and tail appendages.

== Species ==
The genus Austroargiolestes includes the following species:

- Austroargiolestes alpinus (Tillyard, 1913) – New England Flatwing
- Austroargiolestes amabilis (Förster, 1899) – Flame Flatwing
- Austroargiolestes aureus (Tillyard, 1906) – Tropical Flatwing
- Austroargiolestes brookhousei Theischinger & O'Farrell, 1986 – Barrington Flatwing
- Austroargiolestes calcaris (Fraser, 1958) – Powdered Flatwing
- Austroargiolestes christine Theischinger & O'Farrell, 1986 – Milky Flatwing
- Austroargiolestes chrysoides (Tillyard, 1913) – Golden Flatwing
- Austroargiolestes elke Theischinger & O'Farrell, 1986 – Azure Flatwing
- Austroargiolestes icteromelas (Selys, 1862) – Common Flatwing
- Austroargiolestes isabellae Theischinger & O'Farrell, 1986 – Sydney Flatwing

== See also ==
- List of Odonata species of Australia
