= Argiolestinae =

Scientific classification
- Kingdom: Animalia
- Phylum: Arthropoda
- Clade: Pancrustacea
- Class: Insecta
- Order: Odonata
- Suborder: Zygoptera
- Superfamily: Calopterygoidea
- Family: Argiolestidae
- Subfamily: Argiolestinae; Fraser, 1957

Subfamily of damselflies

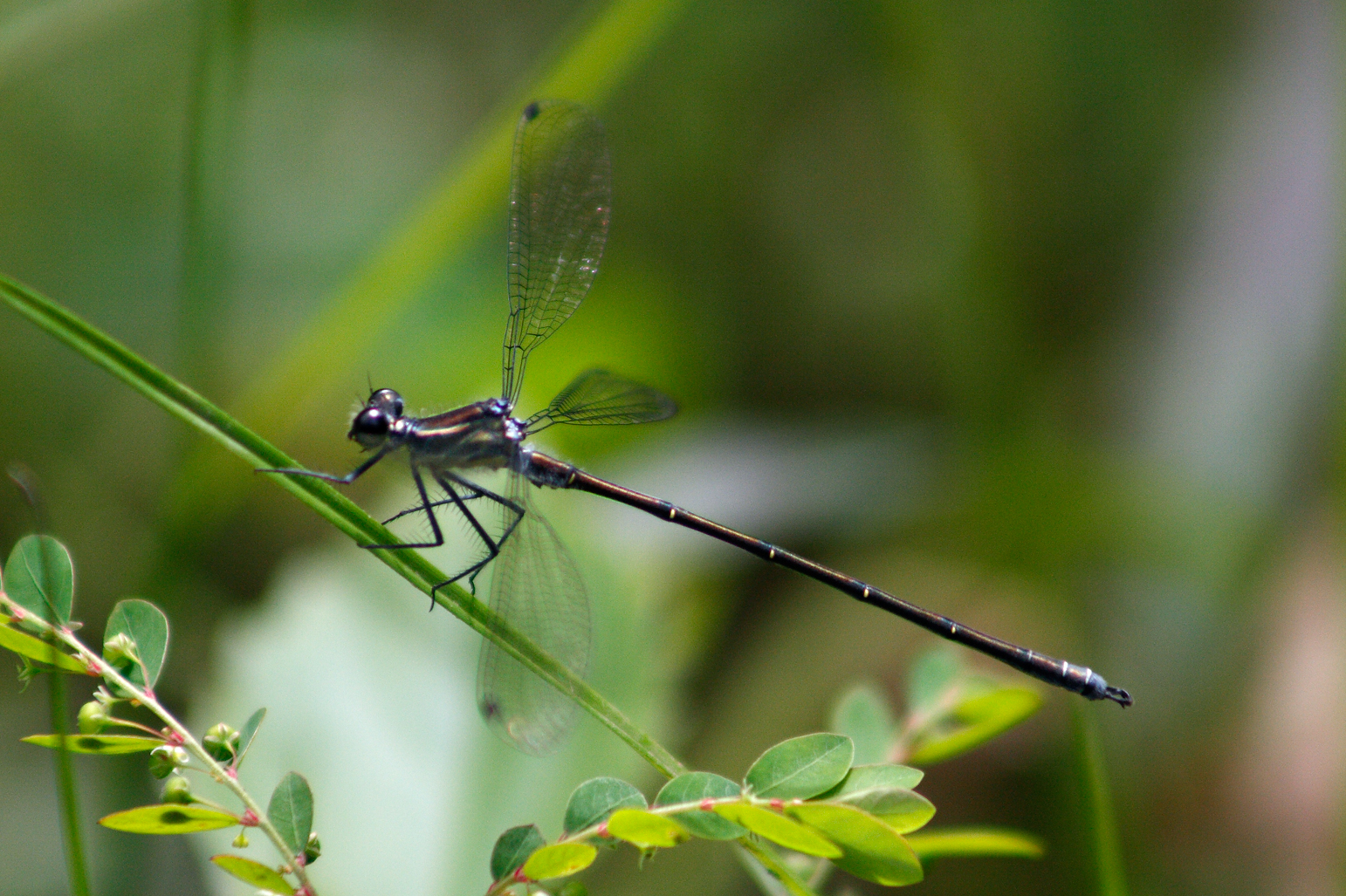
Common Flatwing (male) Austroargiolestes icteromelas

Argiolestinae is a subfamily of damselflies. They belong to the flatwing damselfly family, Argiolestidae. Like their relatives but unlike damselflies of other families, they usually spread their wings horizontally when resting. It is the largest subfamily in Argiolestidae, making up almost three-quarters of the family's species, found primarily in Australia, New Guinea, and New Caledonia.

== Genera ==
The following genera are placed in the Argiolestinae:

- Archiargiolestes Kennedy, 1925
- Argiolestes Selys, 1862
- Austroargiolestes Kennedy, 1925
- Caledargiolestes Kennedy, 1925
- Caledopteryx Kennedy, 1925
- Celebargiolestes Kennedy, 1925
- Eoargiolestes Kalkman & Theischinger, 2013
- Griseargiolestes Theischinger, 1998
- Luzonargiolestes Kalkman & Theischinger, 2013
- Metagrion Calvert, 1913
- Miniargiolestes Theischinger, 1998
- Podopteryx Selys, 1871
- Pyrrhargiolestes Kalkman & Theischinger, 2013
- Solomonargiolestes Kalkman & Theischinger, 2013
- Trineuragrion Ris, 1915
- Wahnesia Förster, 1900
