= Austroargiolestes alpinus =

New England flatwing

Conservation status
- Near Threatened (IUCN 3.1)

Scientific classification
- Kingdom: Animalia
- Phylum: Arthropoda
- Clade: Pancrustacea
- Class: Insecta
- Order: Odonata
- Suborder: Zygoptera
- Family: Argiolestidae
- Genus: Austroargiolestes
- Species: A. alpinus

Binomial name
- Austroargiolestes alpinus (Tillyard, 1913)
- Distribution of Archiargiolestes alpinus in eastern Australia

Synonyms
- Argiolestes alpinus Tillyard, 1913

Species of damselfly

Austroargiolestes alpinus is a species of Australian damselfly in the family Argiolestidae, commonly known as a New England flatwing. It is endemic to north-eastern New South Wales, where it inhabits streams and bogs.

Austroargiolestes alpinus is a large, black and pale blue damselfly, without pruinescence. Like other members of the family Argiolestidae, it rests with its wings outspread.

Austroargiolestes alpinus is similar in appearance to Austroargiolestes brookhousei.

== Etymology ==
The genus name Austroargiolestes combines the prefix austro- (from Latin auster, meaning “south wind”, hence “southern”) with Argiolestes, the name of a related genus. It refers to a southern representative of that group.

The species name alpinus is a Latin word meaning “of the Alps”, referring to the species’ occurrence in mountainous areas of New South Wales.

== Gallery ==
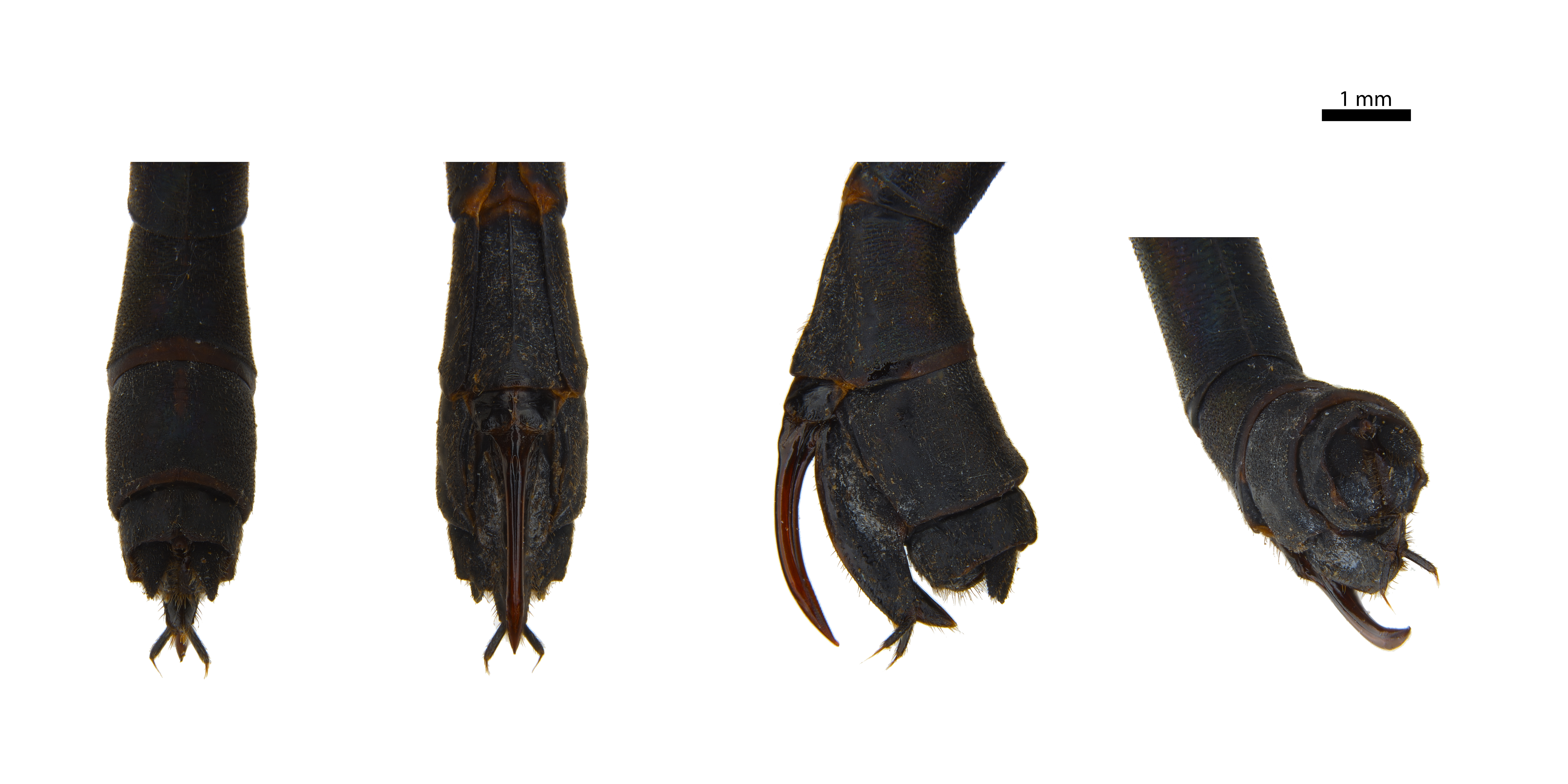
Tip of female tail

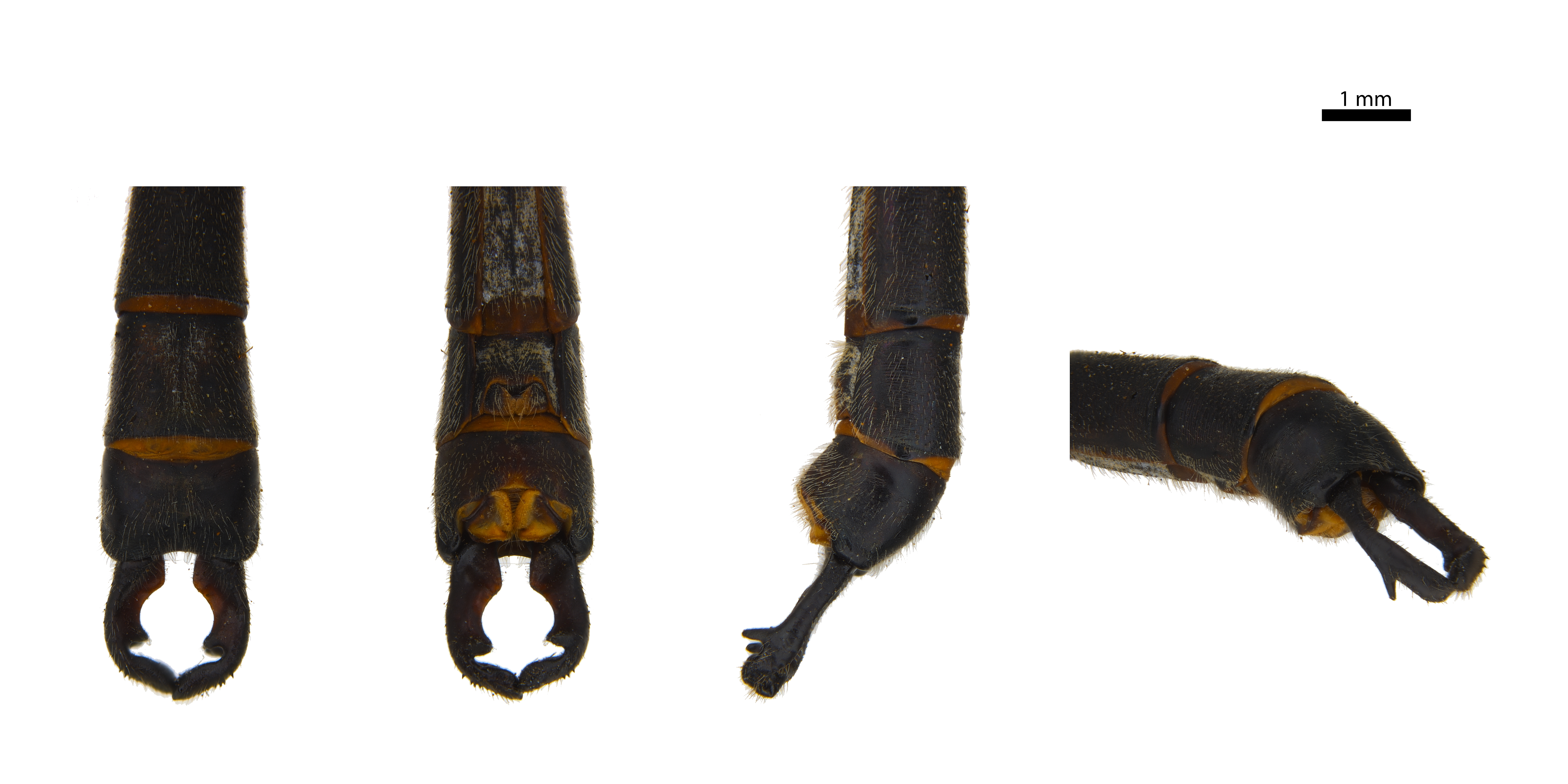
Tip of male tail

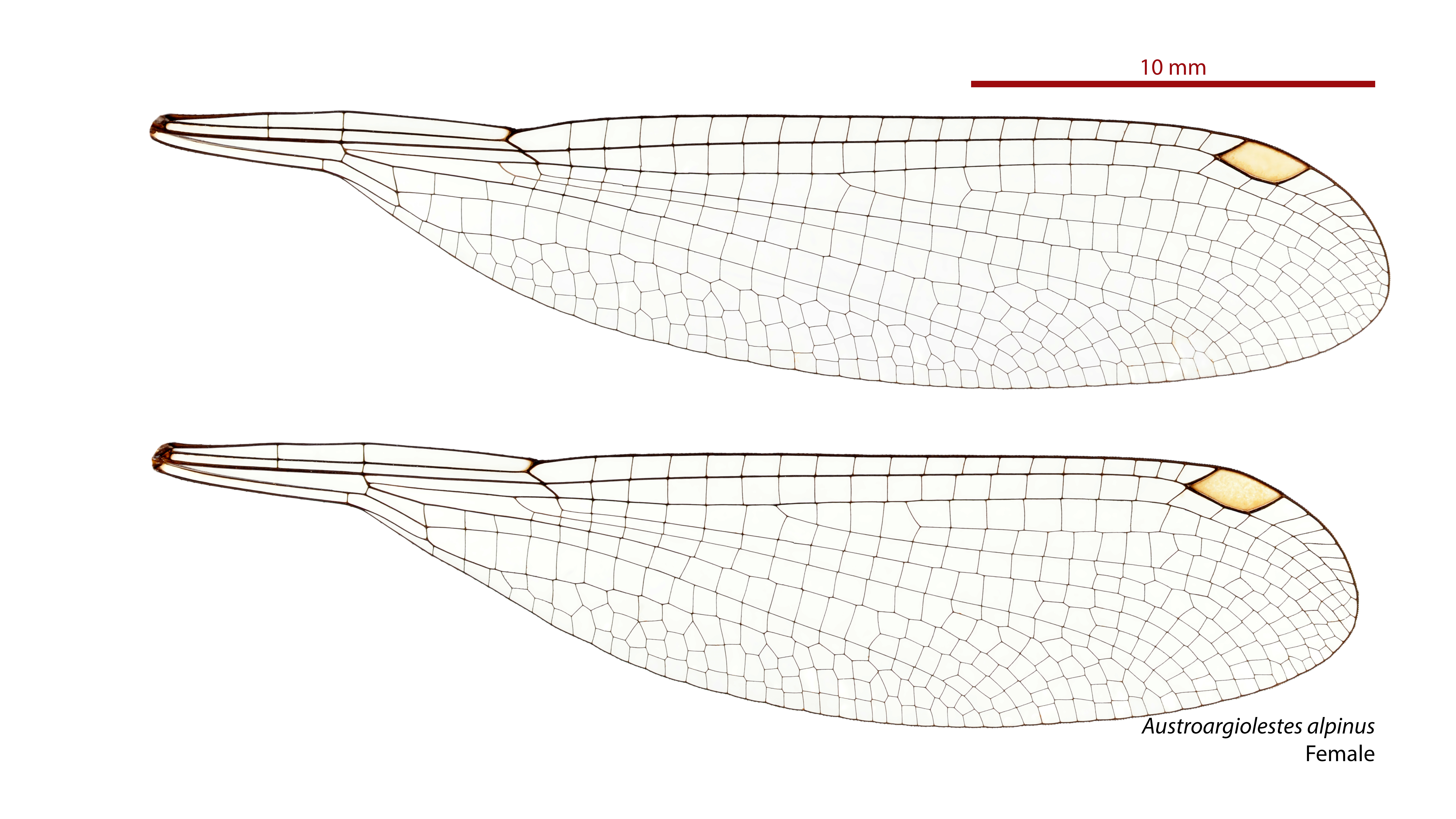
Female wings

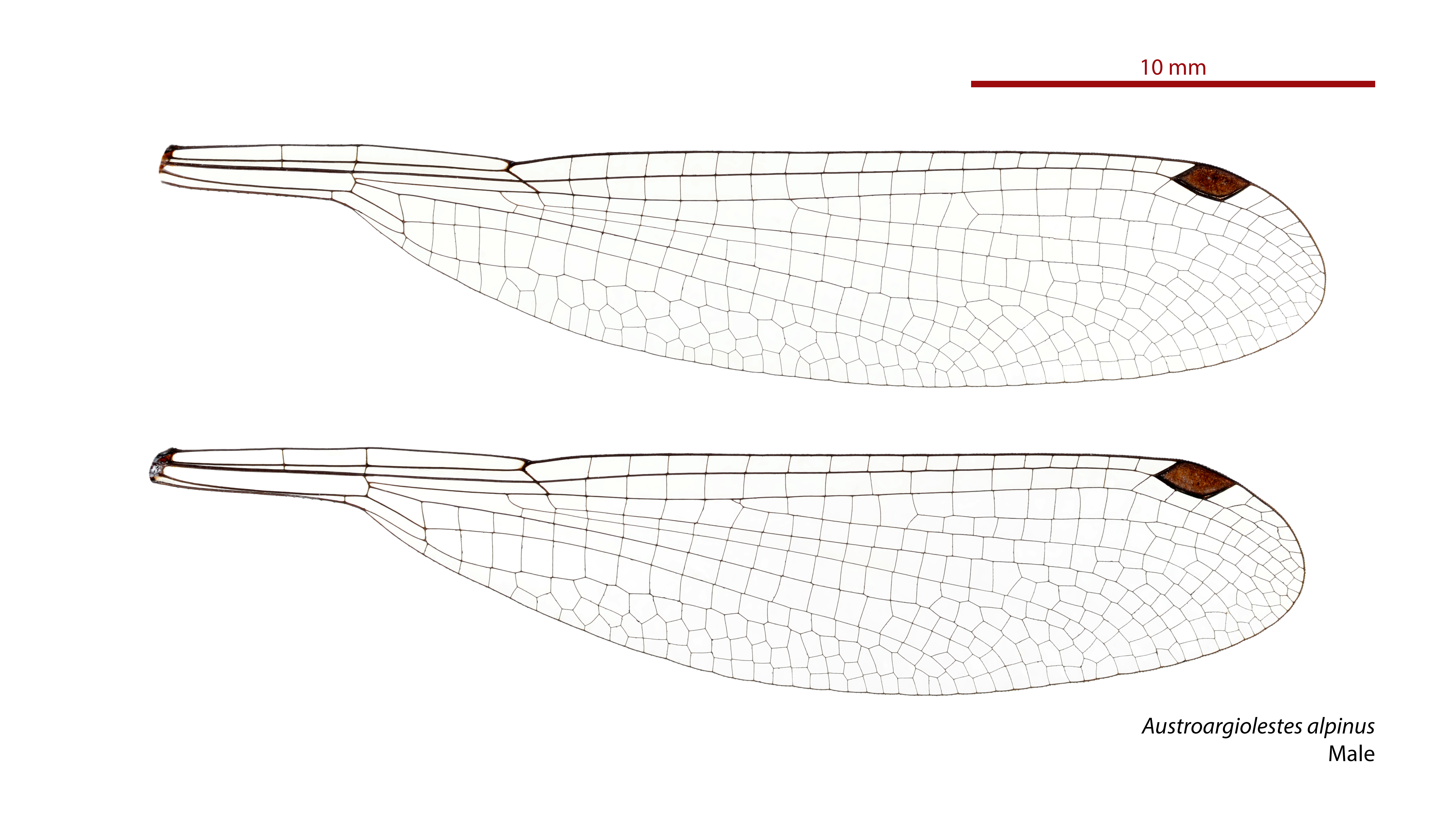
Male wings

== See also ==
- List of Odonata species of Australia
