= Austroargiolestes calcaris =

Powdered flatwing

Conservation status
- Least Concern (IUCN 3.1)

Scientific classification
- Kingdom: Animalia
- Phylum: Arthropoda
- Clade: Pancrustacea
- Class: Insecta
- Order: Odonata
- Suborder: Zygoptera
- Family: Argiolestidae
- Genus: Austroargiolestes
- Species: A. calcaris

Binomial name
- Austroargiolestes calcaris (Fraser, 1958)

Synonyms
- Argiolestes calcaris Fraser, 1958

Species of damselfly

Austroargiolestes calcaris is a species of Australian damselfly in the family Argiolestidae, commonly known as a powdered flatwing. It is endemic to south-eastern Australia, where it inhabits streams, deep pools and bogs, generally in mountainous areas.

Austroargiolestes calcaris is a medium-sized to large, black and pale yellow damselfly, strongly pruinescent when mature. Like other members of the family Argiolestidae it rests with its wings outspread.

Austroargiolestes calcaris appears similar to Austroargiolestes isabellae, which is found in the Sydney Basin.

== Etymology ==
The genus name Austroargiolestes combines the prefix austro- (from Latin auster, meaning "south wind", hence "southern") with Argiolestes, the name of a related genus. It refers to a southern representative of that group.

The species name calcaris is derived from the Latin calcar ("spur"), referring to the spine on male appendages.

== Gallery ==
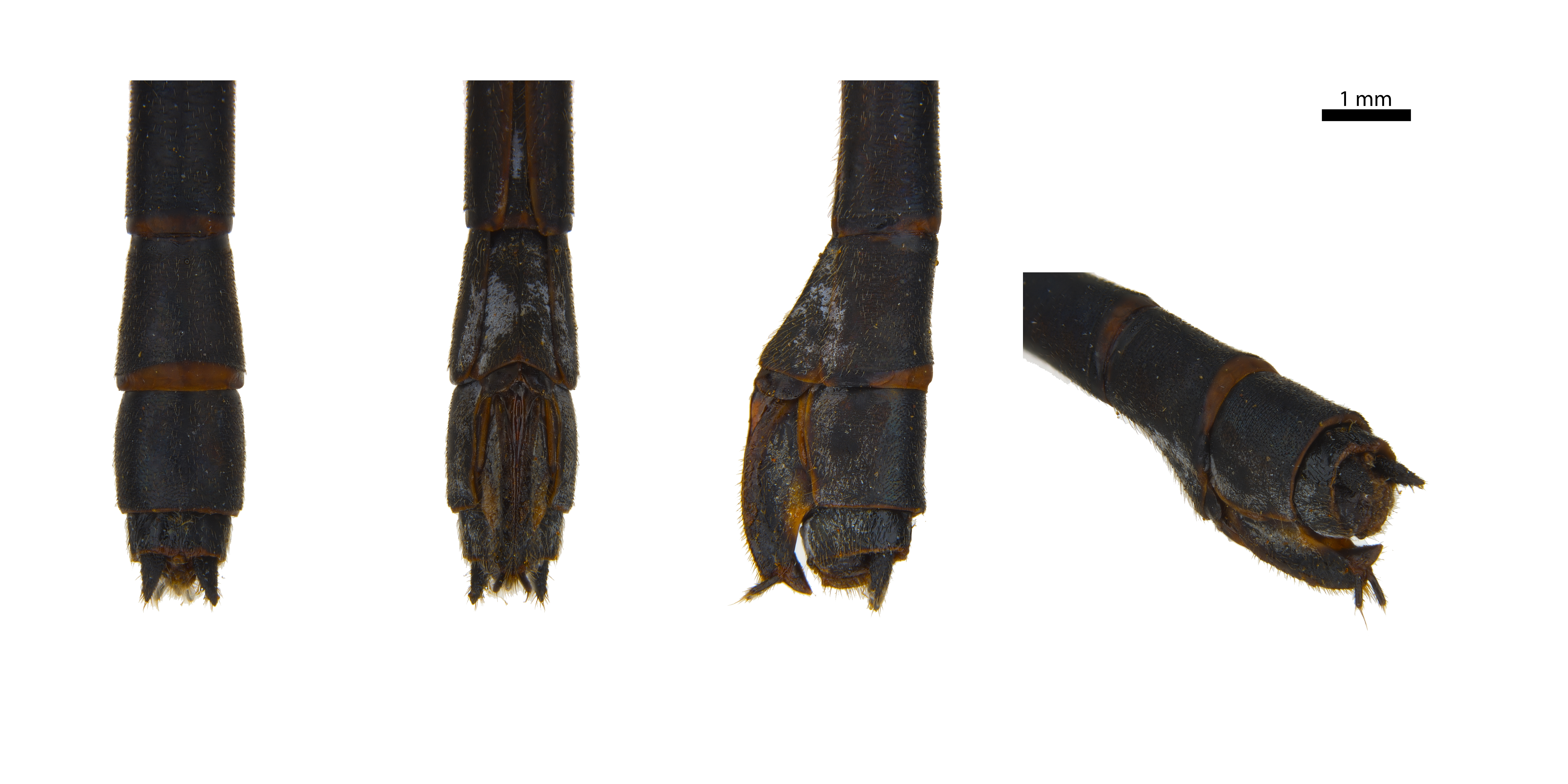
Tip of female tail

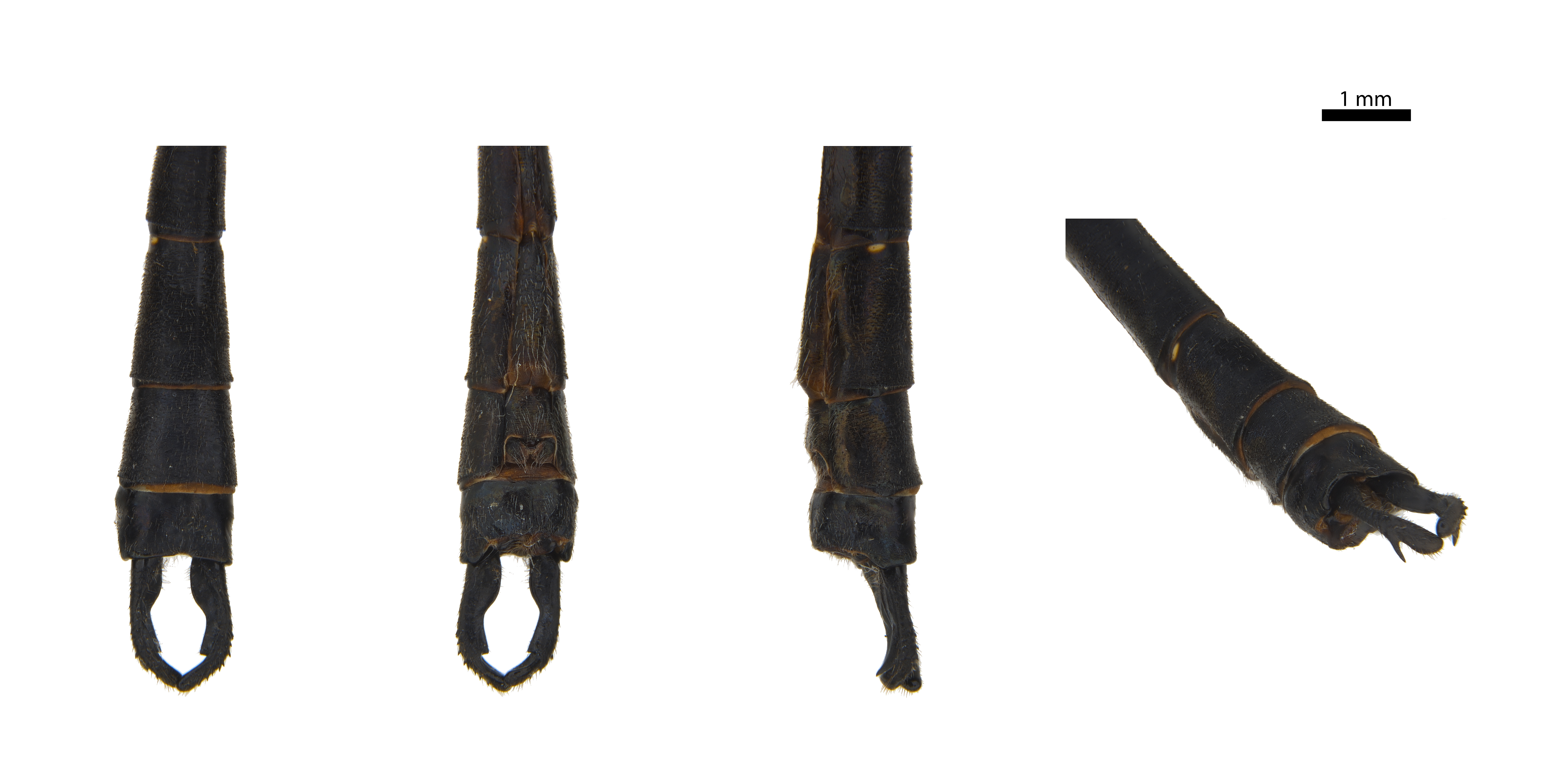
Tip of male tail

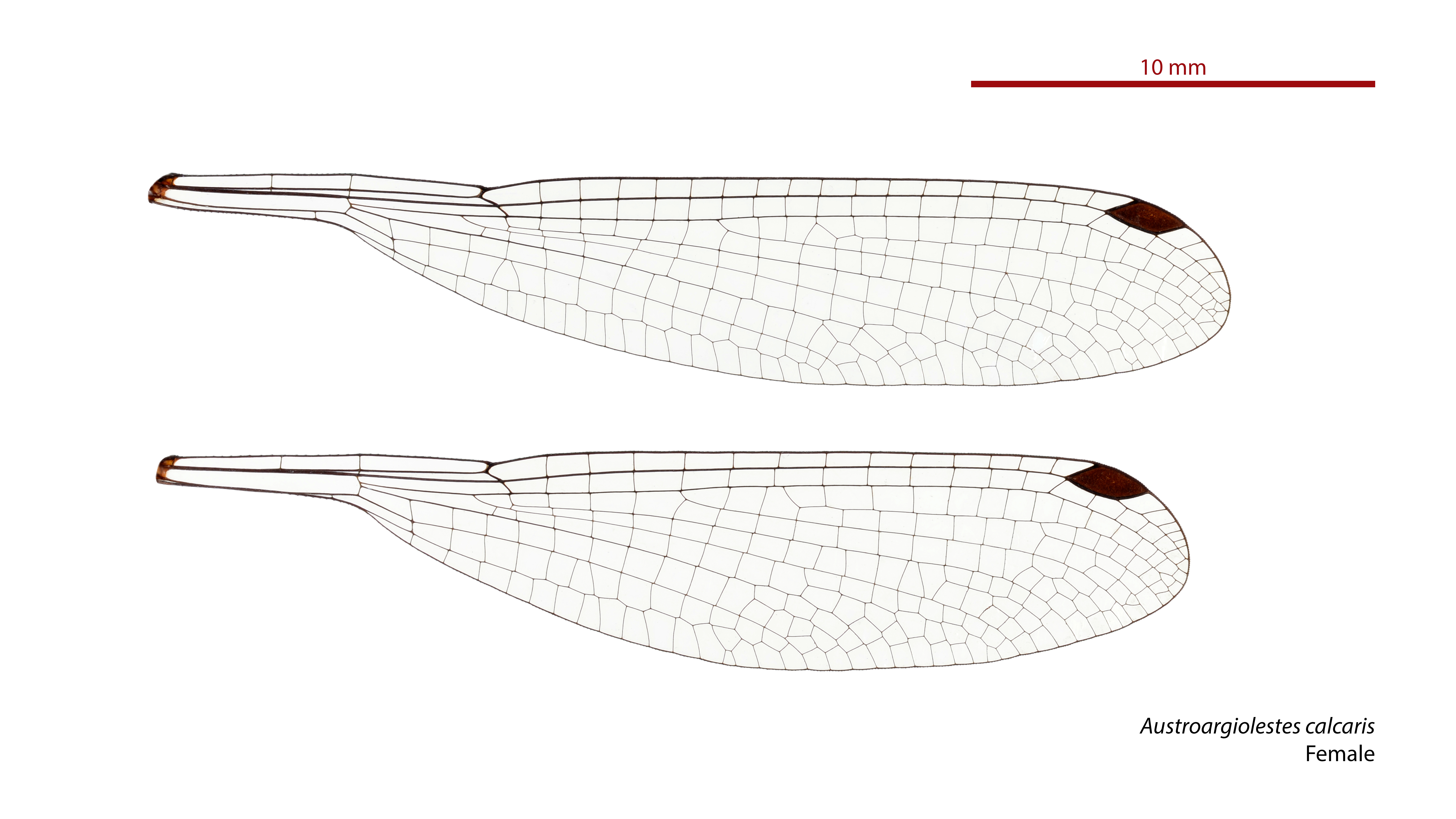
Female wings

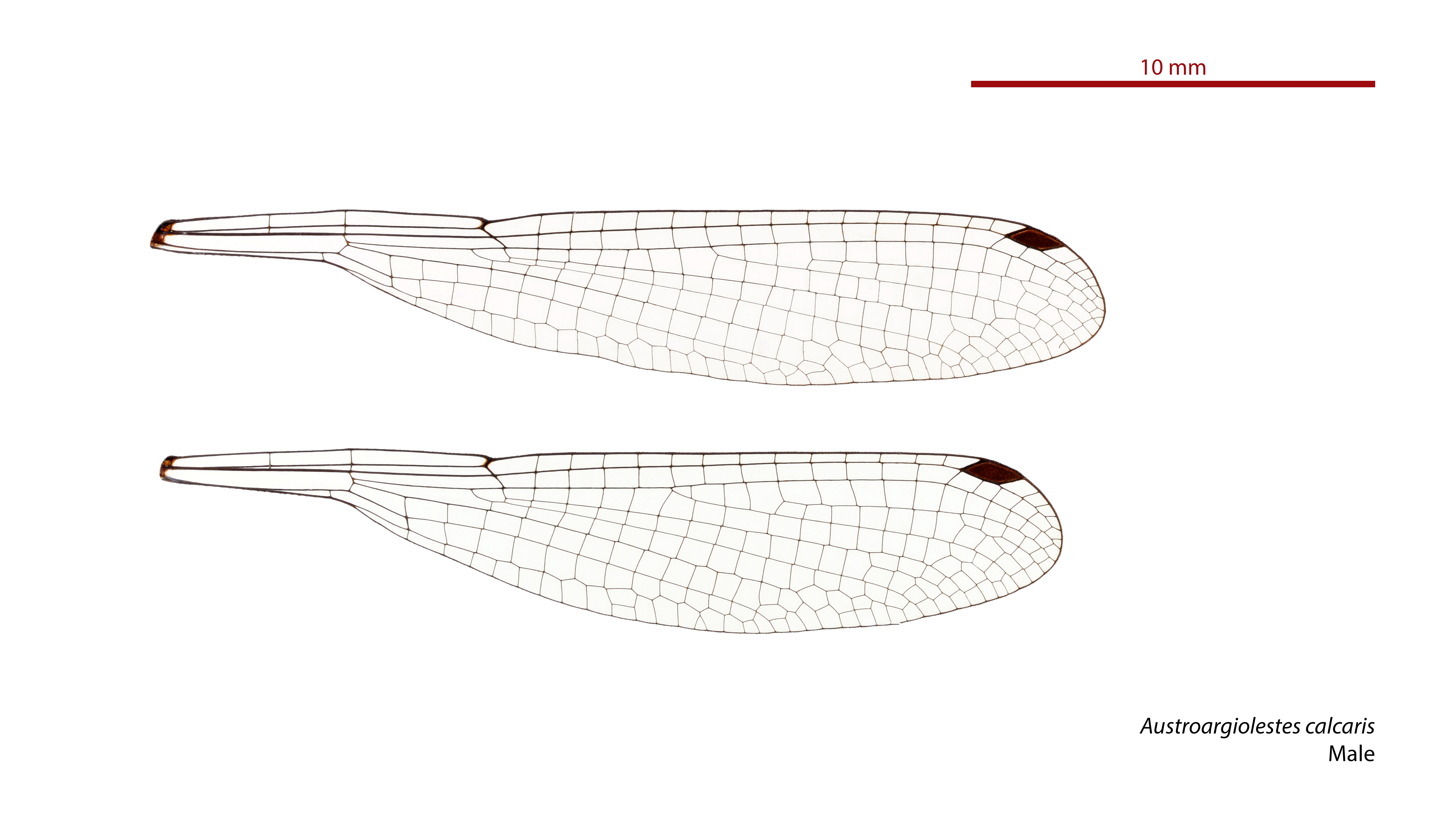
Male wings

== See also ==
- List of Odonata species of Australia
