= Austroargiolestes christine =

Milky flatwing

Conservation status
- Least Concern (IUCN 3.1)

Scientific classification
- Kingdom: Animalia
- Phylum: Arthropoda
- Clade: Pancrustacea
- Class: Insecta
- Order: Odonata
- Suborder: Zygoptera
- Family: Argiolestidae
- Genus: Austroargiolestes
- Species: A. christine

Binomial name
- Austroargiolestes christine Theischinger & O'Farrell, 1986

Species of damselfly

Austroargiolestes christine is a species of Australian damselfly in the family Argiolestidae, commonly known as a milky flatwing. It is endemic to mountain areas of northern New South Wales, where it inhabits streams and boggy areas.

Austroargiolestes christine is a medium-sized to large, black and pale yellow damselfly, with pruinescence on adult bodies . Like other members of the family Argiolestidae, it rests with its wings outspread.

Austroargiolestes christine appears similar to Austroargiolestes isabellae, which is found in the Sydney district.

== Etymology ==
The genus name Austroargiolestes combines the prefix austro- (from Latin auster, meaning “south wind”, hence “southern”) with Argiolestes, the name of a related genus. It refers to a southern representative of that group.

In 1986, Günther Theischinger and Tony O'Farrell named this species christine, an eponym honouring Christine Theischinger, wife of one of the authors.

== Gallery ==
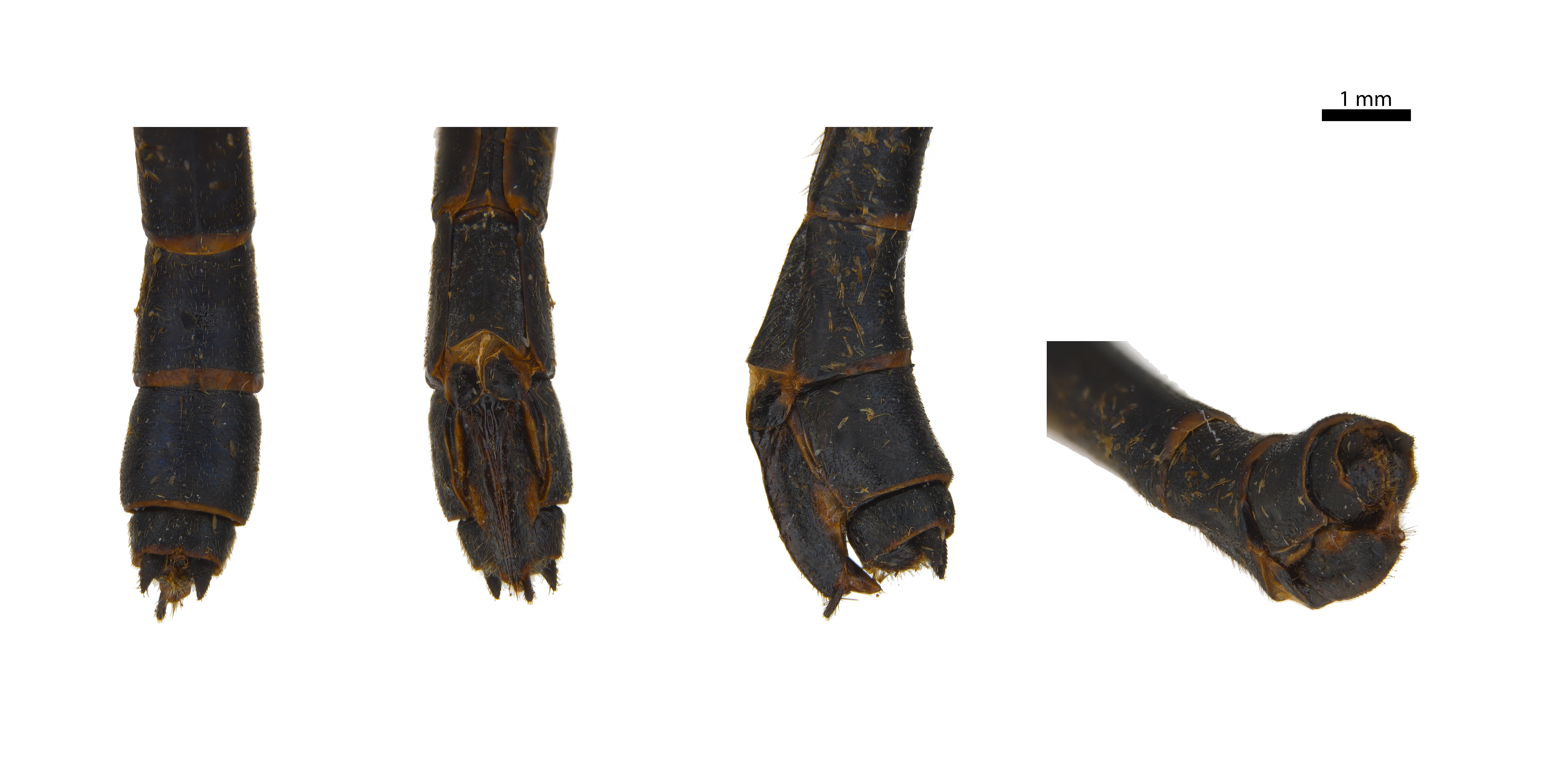
Tip of female tail

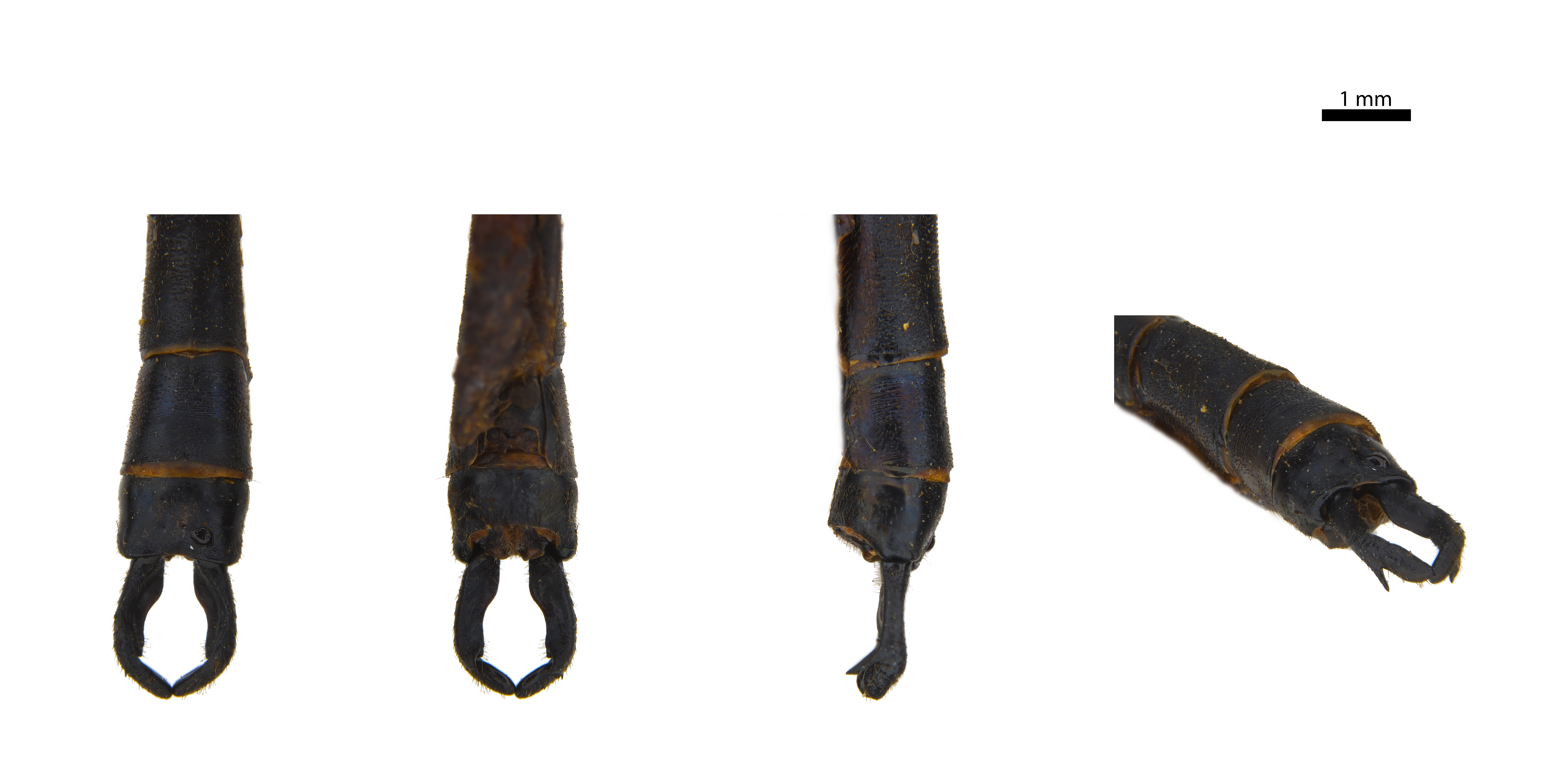
Tip of male tail

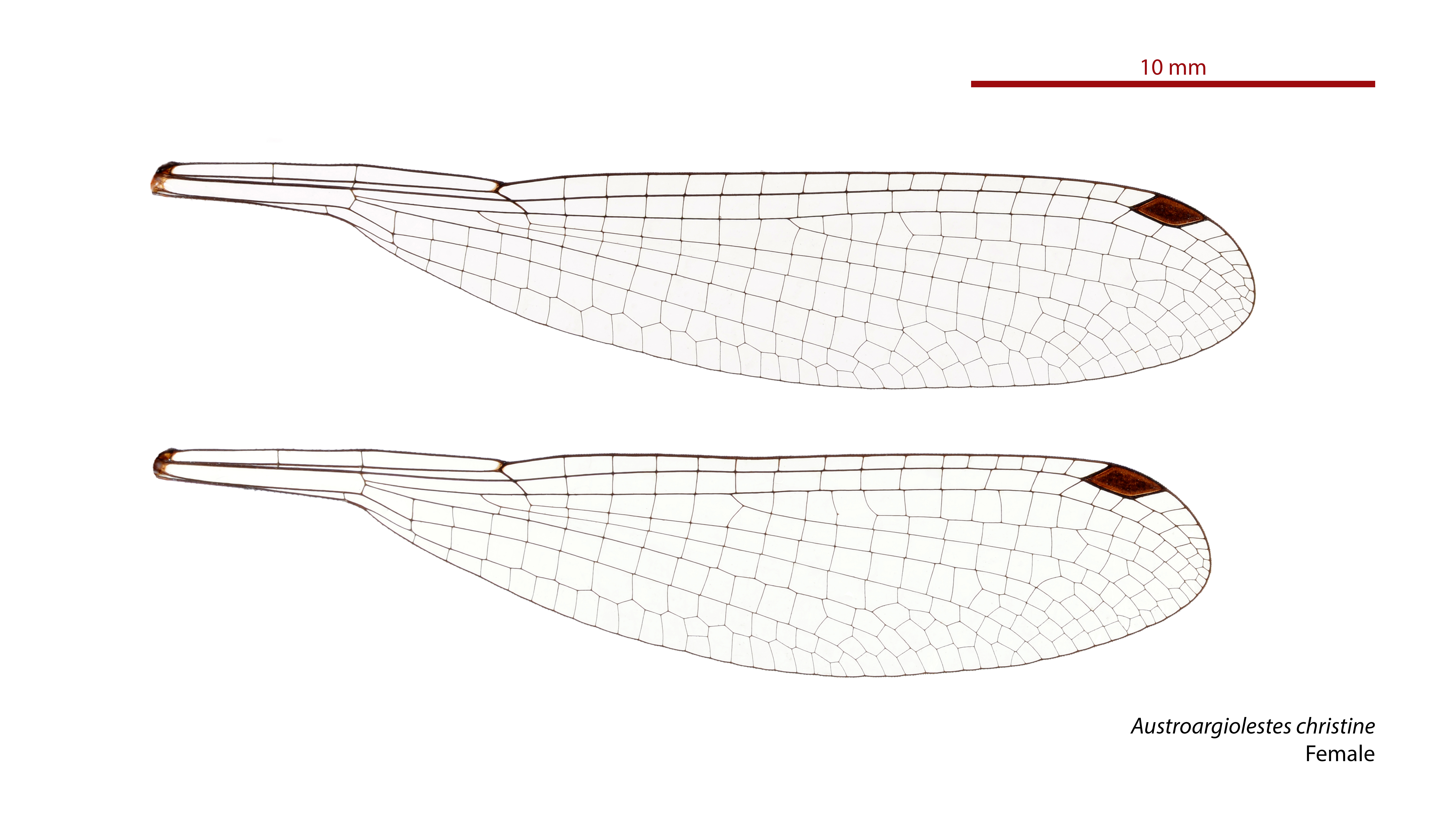
Female wings

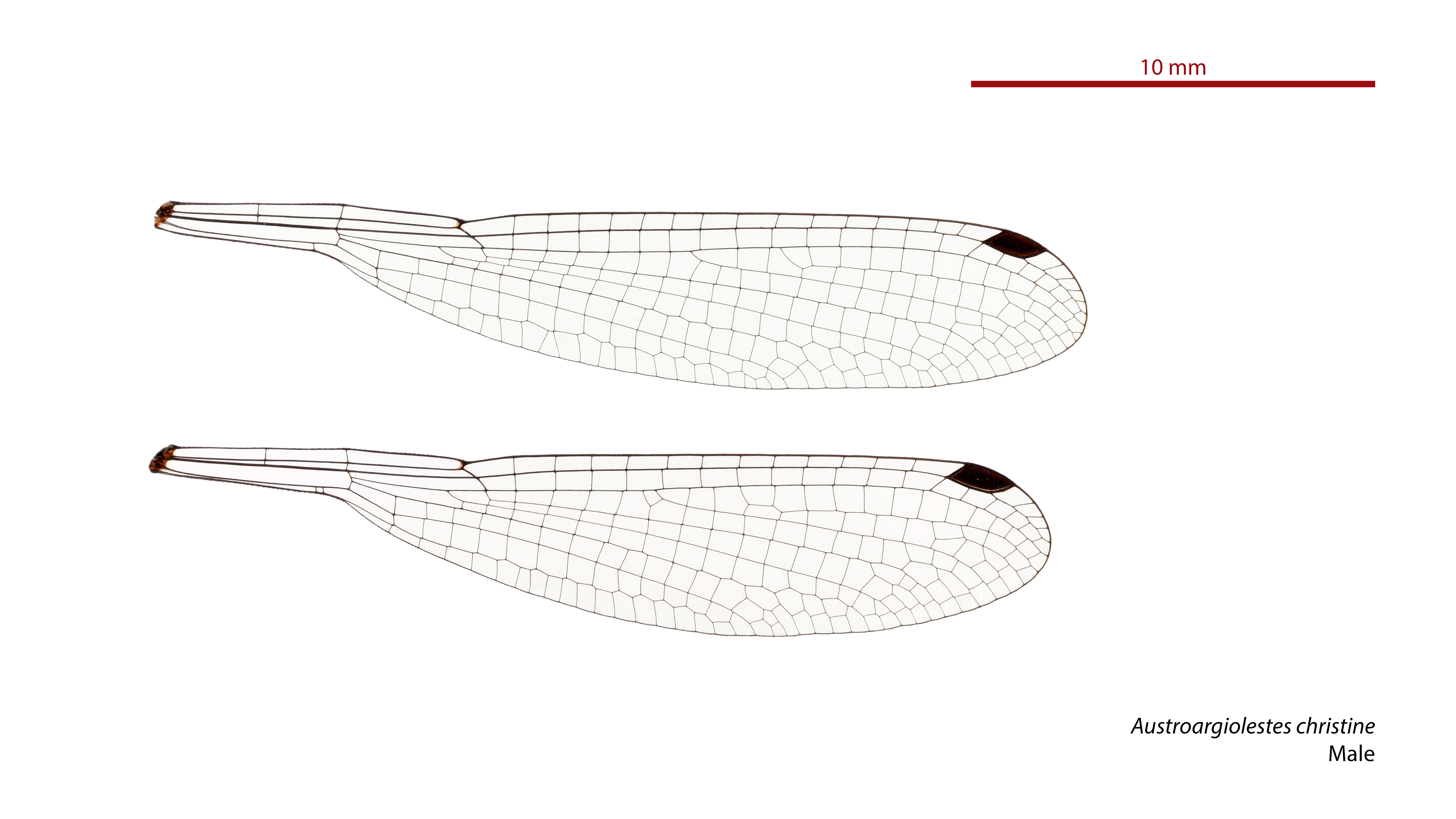
Male wings

== See also ==
- List of Odonata species of Australia
