= Nesolestes pauliani =

Conservation status
- Endangered (IUCN 3.1)

Scientific classification
- Kingdom: Animalia
- Phylum: Arthropoda
- Class: Insecta
- Order: Odonata
- Suborder: Zygoptera
- Family: Argiolestidae
- Genus: Nesolestes
- Species: N. pauliani

Binomial name
- Nesolestes pauliani Fraser, 1951

Species of damselfly

Nesolestes pauliani is a species of damselfly in the family Argiolestidae. It is endemic to Comoros.
