= Nesolestes ranavalona =

Conservation status
- Data Deficient (IUCN 3.1)

Scientific classification
- Kingdom: Animalia
- Phylum: Arthropoda
- Clade: Pancrustacea
- Class: Insecta
- Order: Odonata
- Suborder: Zygoptera
- Family: Argiolestidae
- Genus: Nesolestes
- Species: N. ranavalona

Binomial name
- Nesolestes ranavalona Schmidt, 1951

Species of damselfly

Nesolestes ranavalona is a species of flat-wing damselfly in the family Argiolestidae.
