= Archiargiolestes parvulus =

Midget flatwing

Conservation status
- Near Threatened (IUCN 3.1)

Scientific classification
- Kingdom: Animalia
- Phylum: Arthropoda
- Clade: Pancrustacea
- Class: Insecta
- Order: Odonata
- Suborder: Zygoptera
- Family: Argiolestidae
- Genus: Archiargiolestes
- Species: A. parvulus

Binomial name
- Archiargiolestes parvulus (Watson, 1977)

Synonyms
- Argiolestes parvulus Watson, 1977

Species of damselfly

Archiargiolestes parvulus is a species of Australian damselfly in the family Argiolestidae, commonly known as a midget flatwing. It is endemic to south-western Australia, where it inhabits streams, bogs and swamps.

Archiargiolestes parvulus is a small damselfly, black metallic in colour with pale markings. It rests with its wings outspread.

== Etymology ==
The genus name Archiargiolestes is derived from the Greek ἀρχή (archē, "beginning") combined with Argiolestes, an existing genus of damselflies. In his original description, Kennedy characterised the genus as one of the more primitive members of the Megapodagrioninae.

The species name parvulus is a Latin word meaning "very small".

== Gallery ==
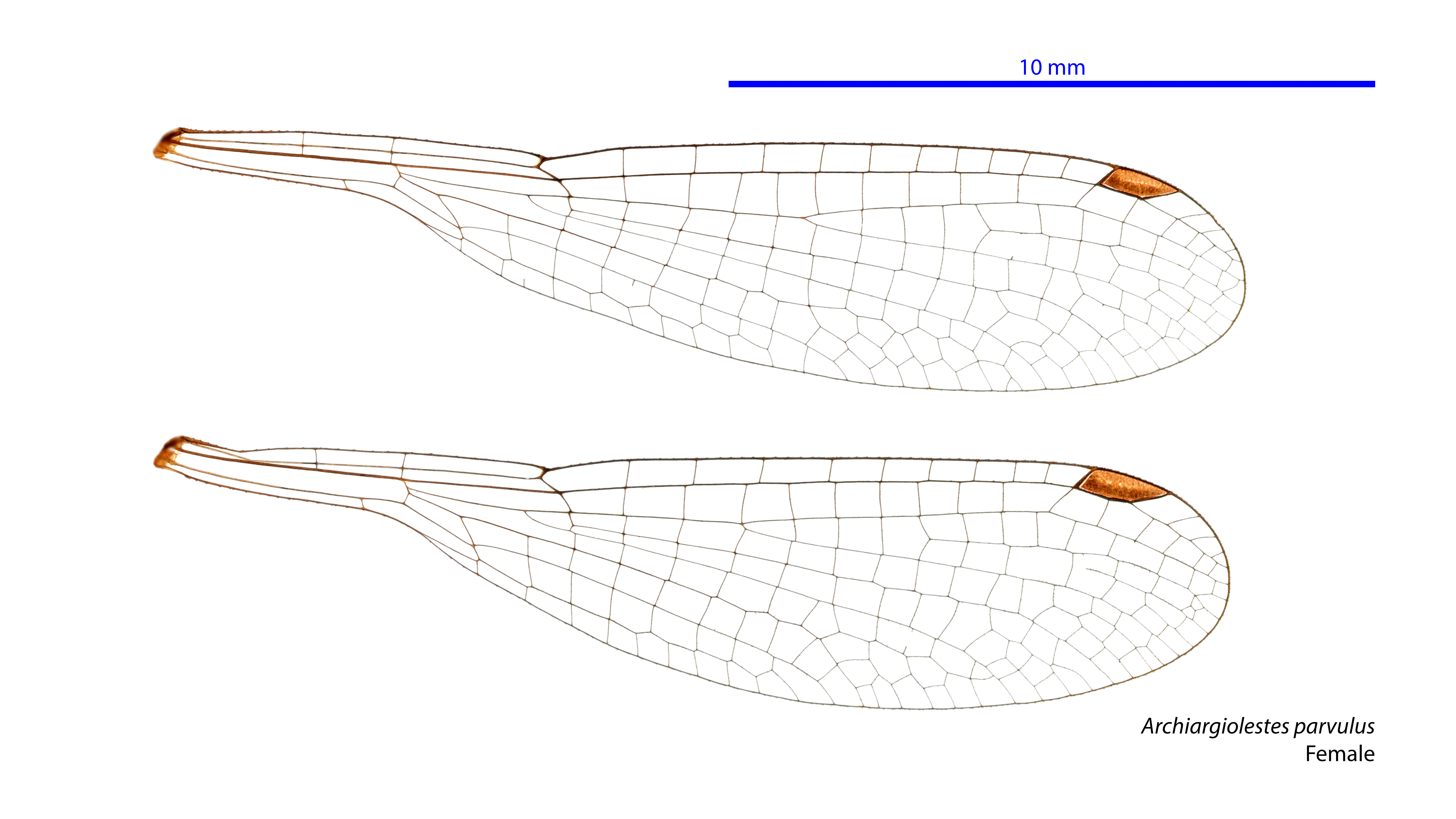
Female wings

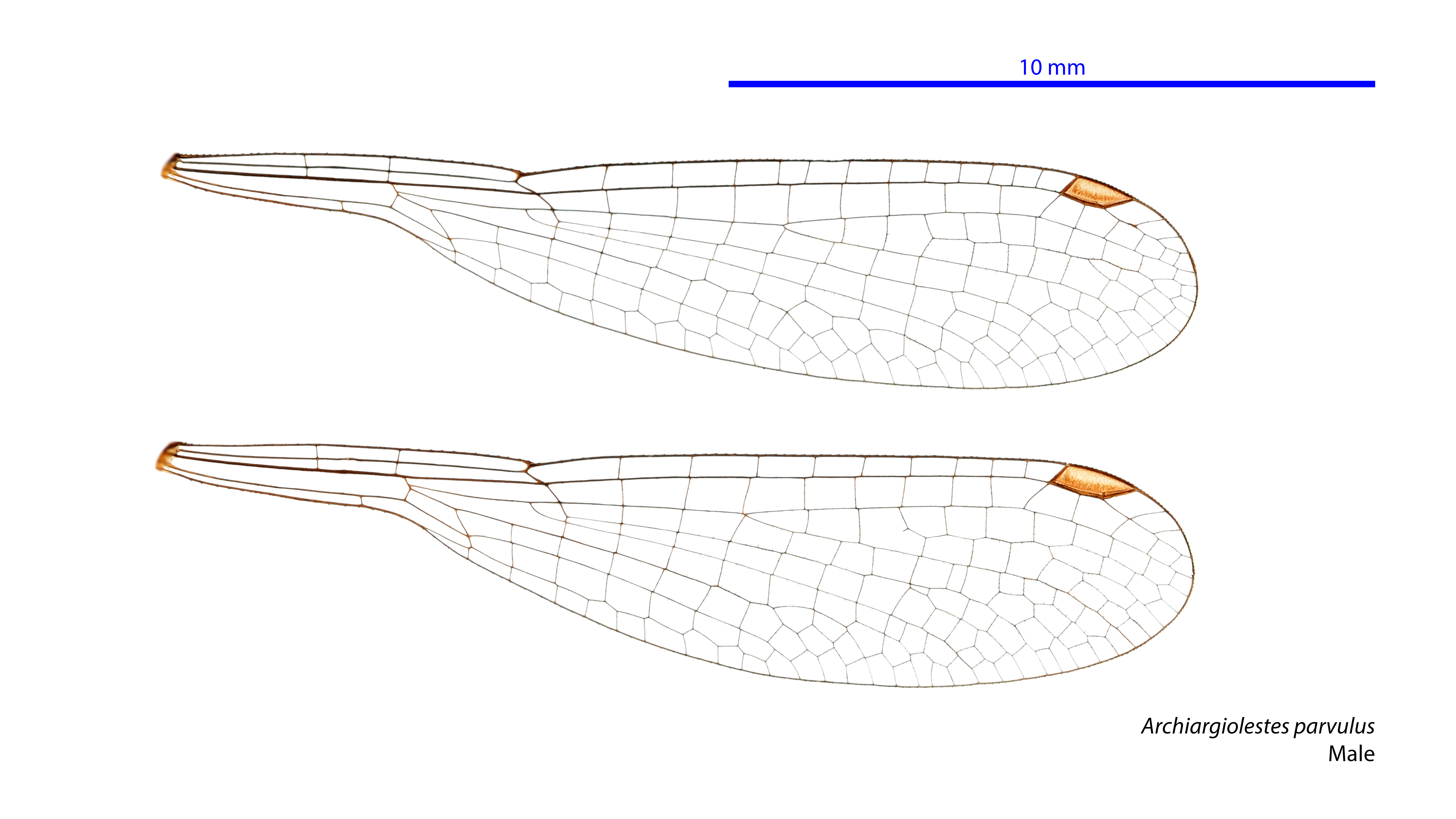
Male wings

== See also ==
- List of Odonata species of Australia
