= Archiargiolestes pusillus =

Little flatwing

Conservation status
- Least Concern (IUCN 3.1)

Scientific classification
- Kingdom: Animalia
- Phylum: Arthropoda
- Clade: Pancrustacea
- Class: Insecta
- Order: Odonata
- Suborder: Zygoptera
- Family: Argiolestidae
- Genus: Archiargiolestes
- Species: A. pusillus

Binomial name
- Archiargiolestes pusillus (Tillyard, 1908)

Synonyms
- Argiolestes minimus pusillus Tillyard, 1908

Species of damselfly

Archiargiolestes pusillus is a species of Australian damselfly in the family Argiolestidae, commonly known as a little flatwing. It is endemic to south-western Australia, where it inhabits streams, bogs and swamps.

Archiargiolestes pusillus is a small damselfly, black metallic in colour with pale markings. It rests with its wings outspread.

== Etymology ==
The genus name Archiargiolestes is derived from the Greek ἀρχή (archē, "beginning") combined with Argiolestes, an existing genus of damselflies. In his original description, Kennedy characterised the genus as one of the more primitive members of the Megapodagrioninae.

The species name pusillus is a Latin word meaning "very small". Robin Tillyard described this damselfly as "An extremely small race found in the southern districts, and differing considerably from the type".

== See also ==
- List of Odonata species of Australia
