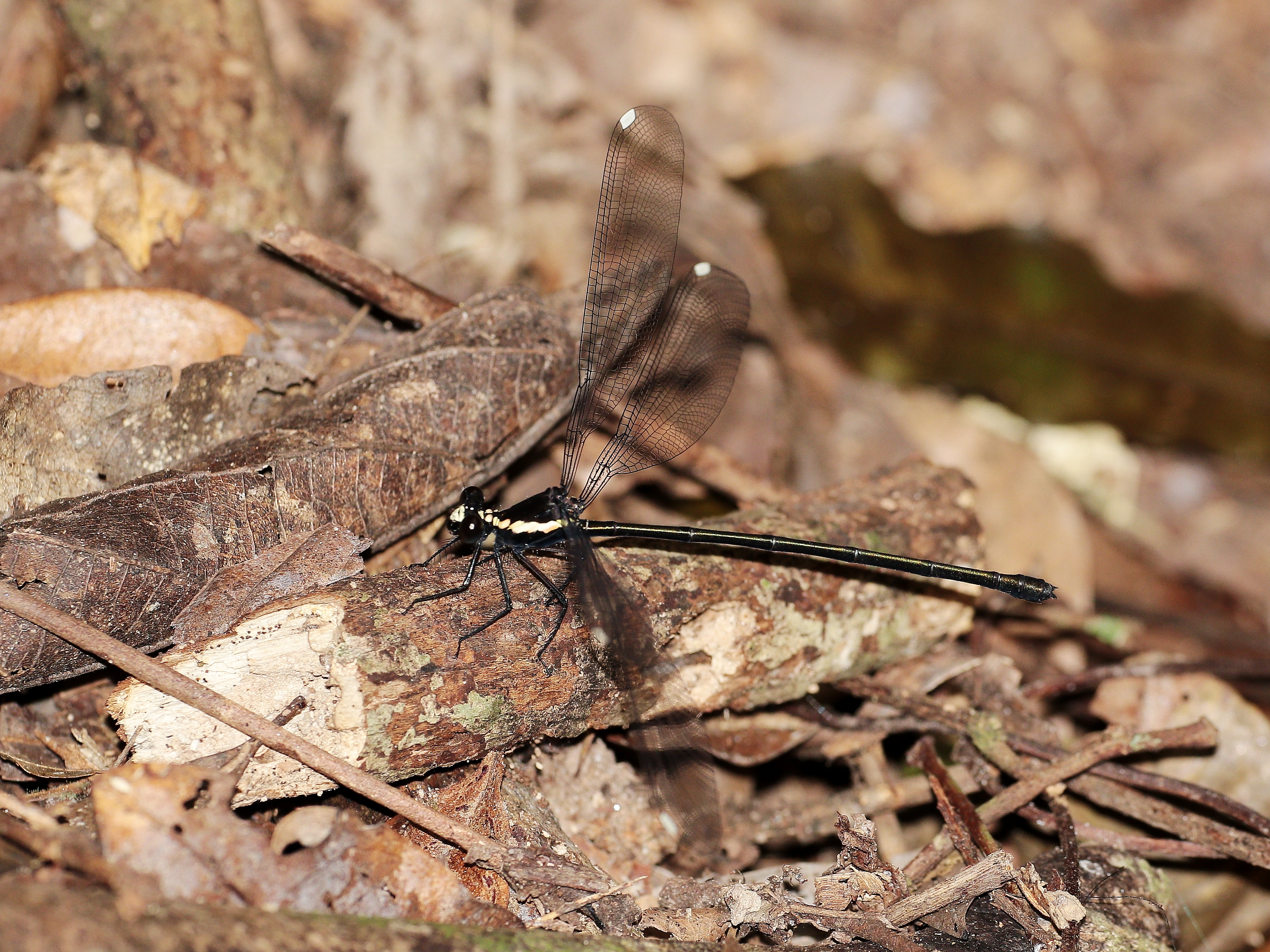
- Female, north Queensland

Conservation status
- Least Concern (IUCN 3.1)

Scientific classification
- Kingdom: Animalia
- Phylum: Arthropoda
- Clade: Pancrustacea
- Class: Insecta
- Order: Odonata
- Suborder: Zygoptera
- Family: Argiolestidae
- Genus: Podopteryx
- Species: P. selysi

Binomial name
- Podopteryx selysi (Förster, 1899)

Synonyms
- Argiolestes selysi Förster, 1899

= Podopteryx selysi =

Treehole flatwing

Species of damselfly

Podopteryx selysi is a species of Australian damselfly in the family Argiolestidae, commonly known as a treehole flatwing. It can be found in coastal northern Australia and New Guinea, where its larvae live in water-filled holes in tree trunks in rainforest.

Podopteryx selysi is a very large damselfly, black-metallic in colour with white to pink markings on its head and body. Like other members of the family Argiolestidae, it rests with its wings outspread.

Unusually, and possibly uniquely for a damselfly, the hindwings of Podopteryx selysi are longer than its forewings. For other damselflies, forewings are usually marginally longer than hindwings.

== Etymology ==
The genus name Podopteryx is derived from the Greek πούς (pous, stem ποδ-, "foot" or "leg") and πτέρυξ (pteryx, "wing"). The first element reflects its placement in the Podagrion group, to which Selys assigned Podopteryx in 1871.

In 1899, Friedrich Förster named this species selysi, an eponym honouring Baron Michel Edmond de Sélys-Longchamps (1813–1900), a Belgian scientist widely regarded as the leading authority on dragonflies and damselflies.

== Gallery ==
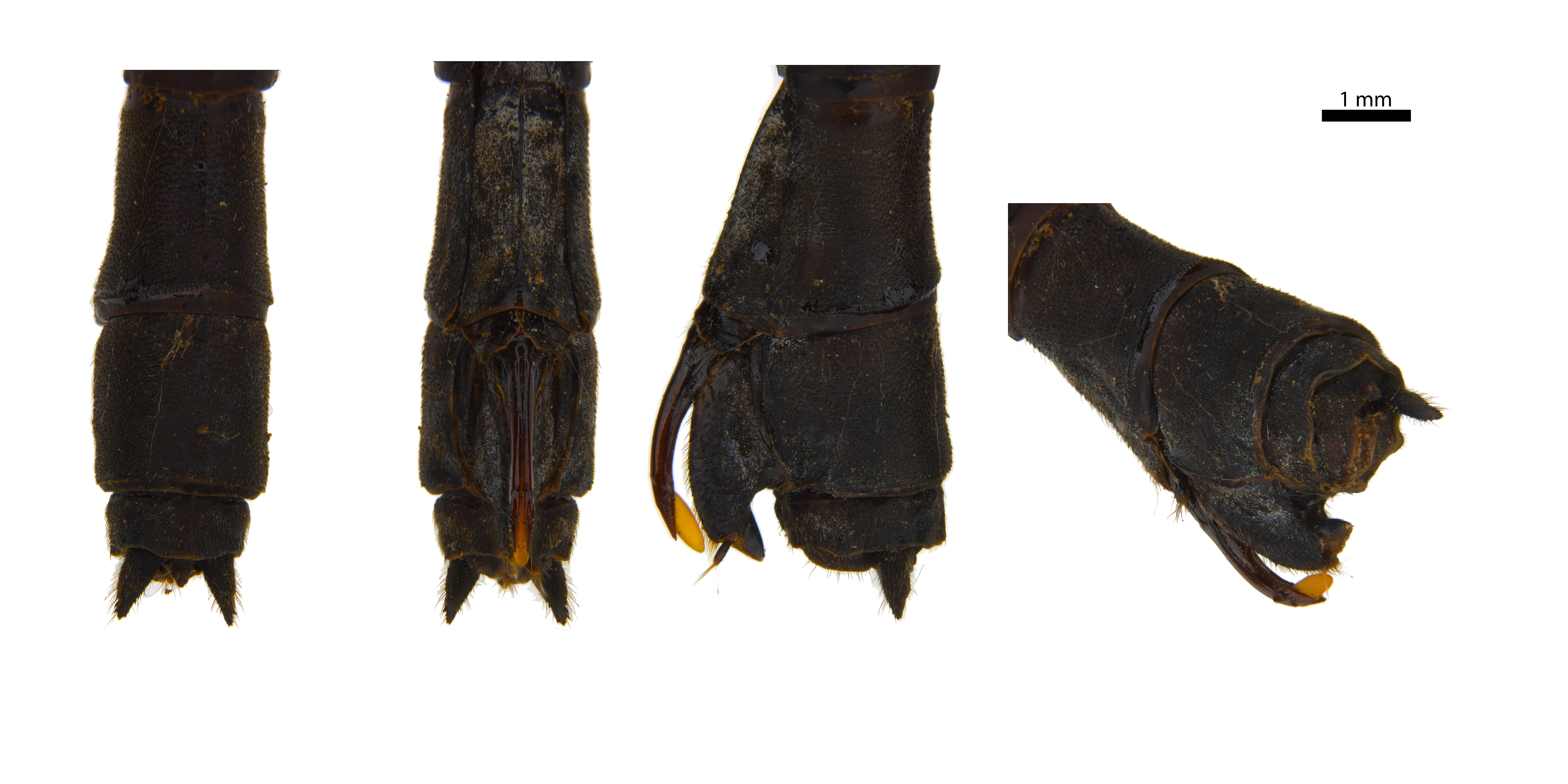
Tip of female tail. Note the egg still in her ovipositor.

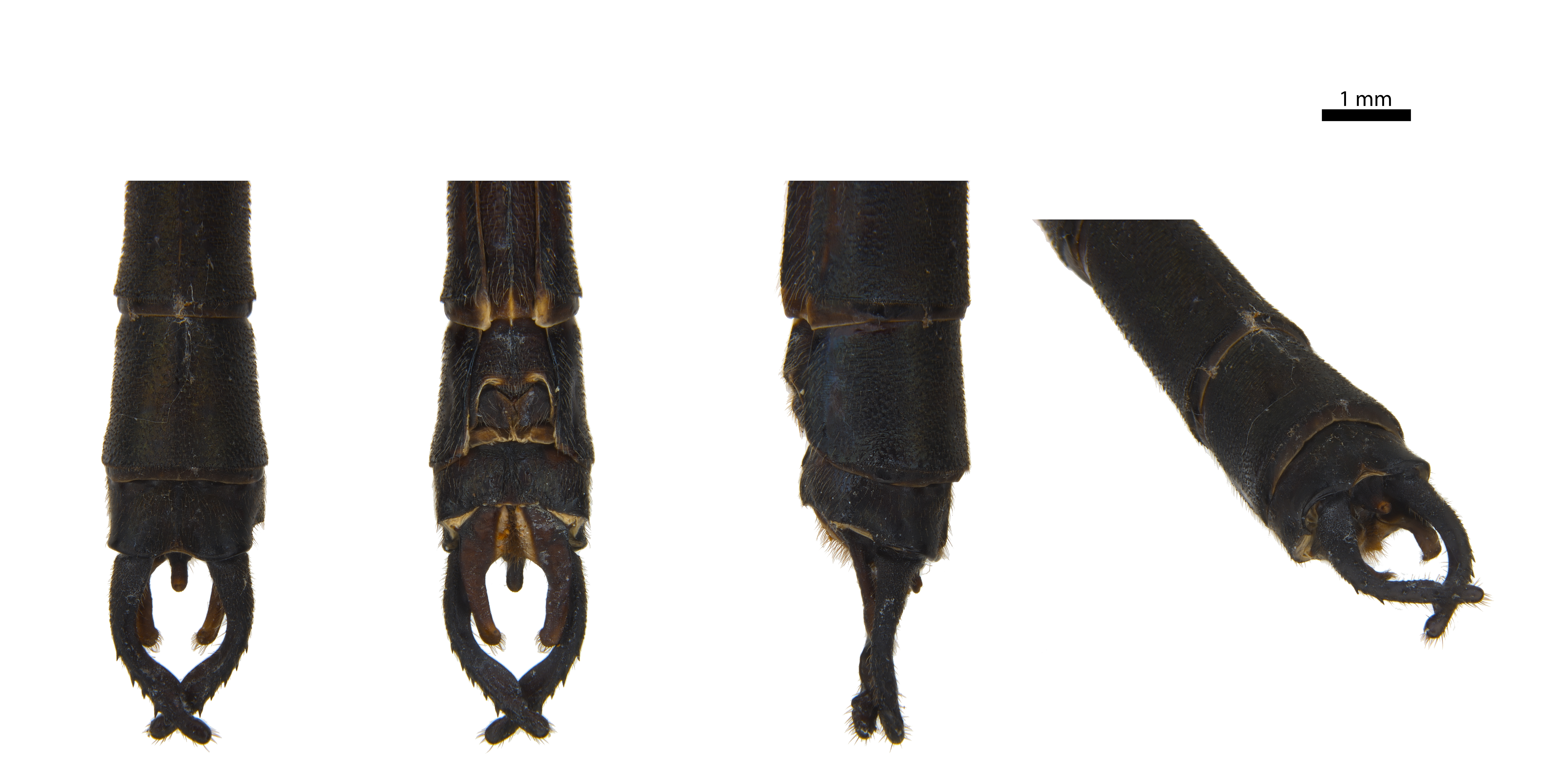
Tip of male tail

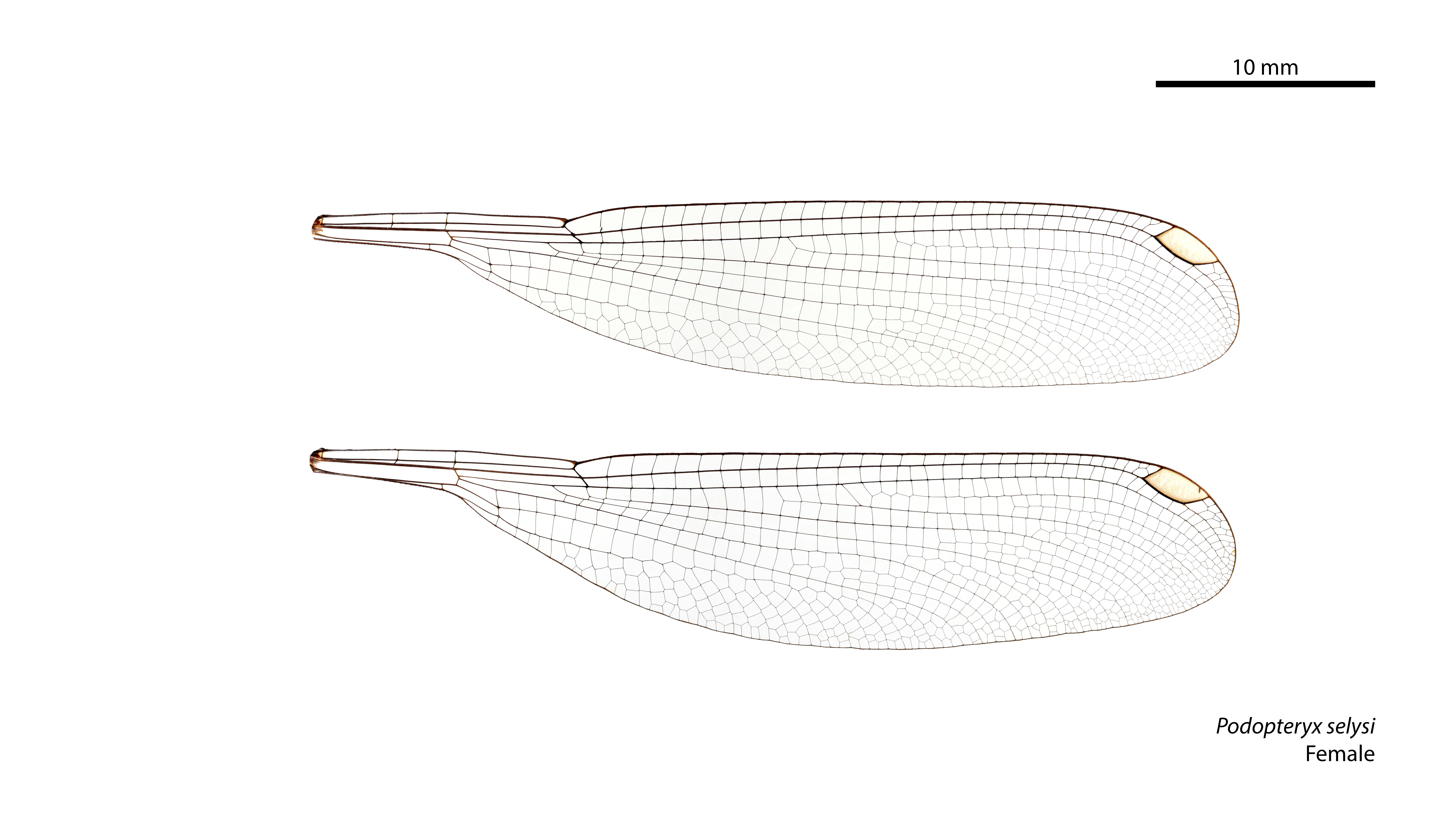
Female wings

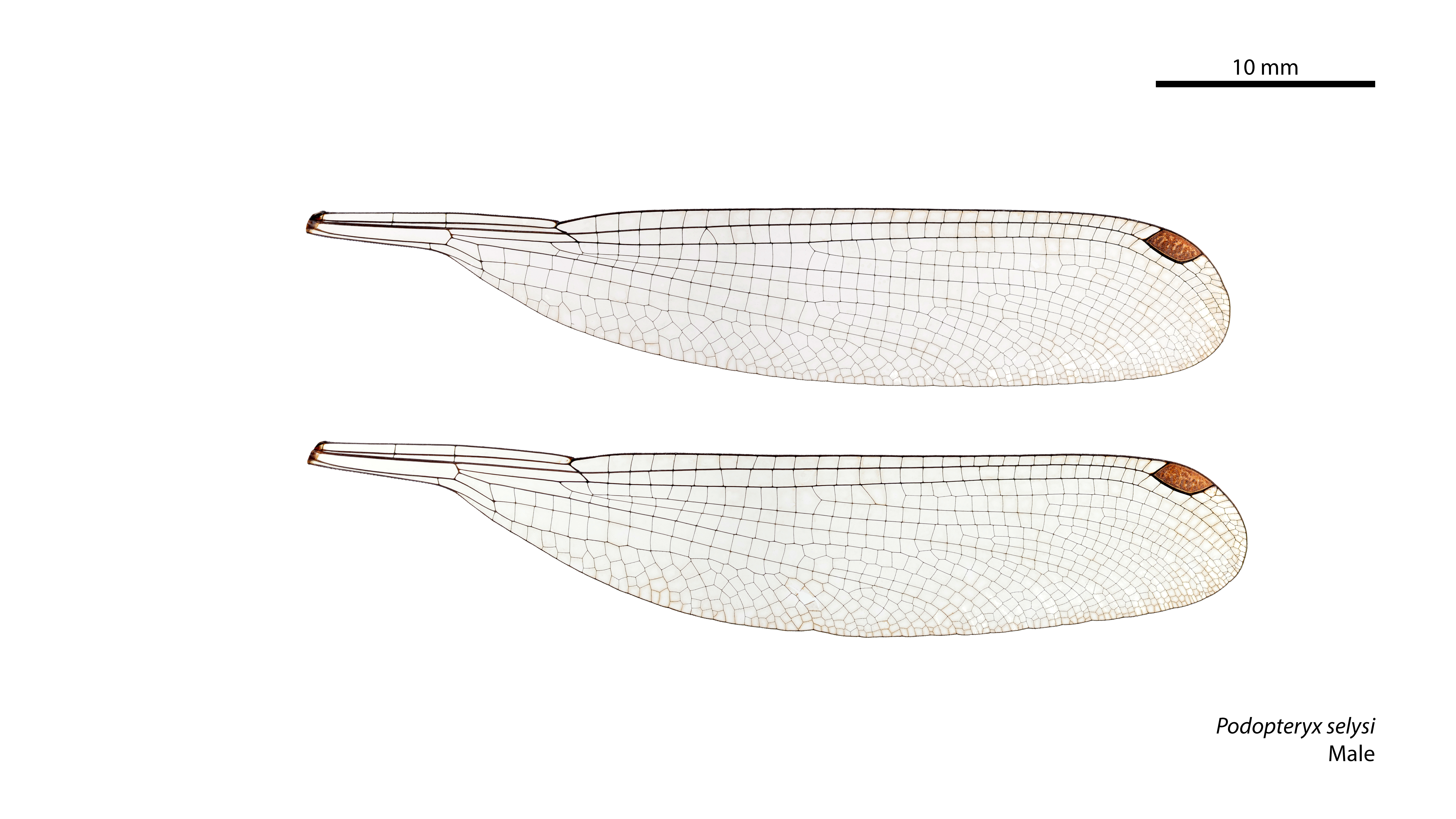
Male wings

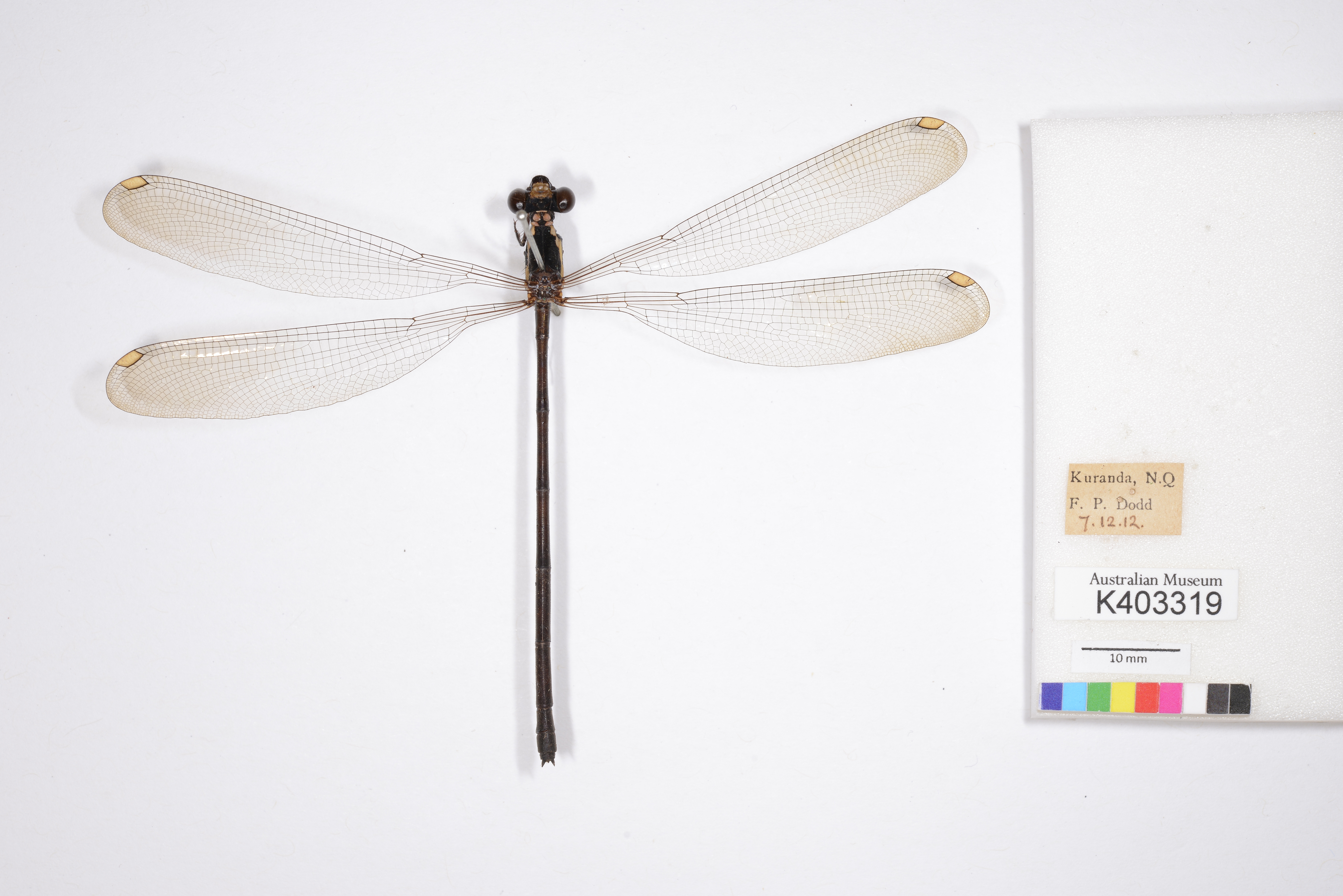
Australian Museum specimen

== See also ==
- List of Odonata species of Australia
