= Podopteryx casuarina =

Conservation status
- Data Deficient (IUCN 3.1)

Scientific classification
- Kingdom: Animalia
- Phylum: Arthropoda
- Clade: Pancrustacea
- Class: Insecta
- Order: Odonata
- Suborder: Zygoptera
- Family: Argiolestidae
- Genus: Podopteryx
- Species: P. casuarina

Binomial name
- Podopteryx casuarina Lieftinck, 1949

Species of damselfly

Podopteryx casuarina is a species of flat-wing damselfly in the family Argiolestidae.

The IUCN conservation status of Podopteryx casuarina is "DD", data deficient, risk undetermined.
