= Archiargiolestes pusillissimus =

Tiny flatwing

Conservation status
- Near Threatened (IUCN 3.1)

Scientific classification
- Kingdom: Animalia
- Phylum: Arthropoda
- Clade: Pancrustacea
- Class: Insecta
- Order: Odonata
- Suborder: Zygoptera
- Family: Argiolestidae
- Genus: Archiargiolestes
- Species: A. pusillissimus

Binomial name
- Archiargiolestes pusillissimus Kennedy, 1925

Species of damselfly

Archiargiolestes pusillissimus is a species of Australian damselfly in the family Argiolestidae, commonly known as a tiny flatwing. It is endemic to south-western Australia, where it inhabits streams, bogs and swamps.

Archiargiolestes pusillissimus is a small damselfly, black metallic in colour with pale markings. It rests with its wings outspread.

== Etymology ==
The genus name Archiargiolestes is derived from the Greek ἀρχή (archē, "beginning") combined with Argiolestes, an existing genus of damselflies. In his original description, Kennedy characterised the genus as one of the more primitive members of the Megapodagrioninae.

The species name pusillissimus is a Latin word meaning "the smallest". With its very short abdomen, Kennedy considered it the smallest species of the subfamily yet found.

== Gallery ==
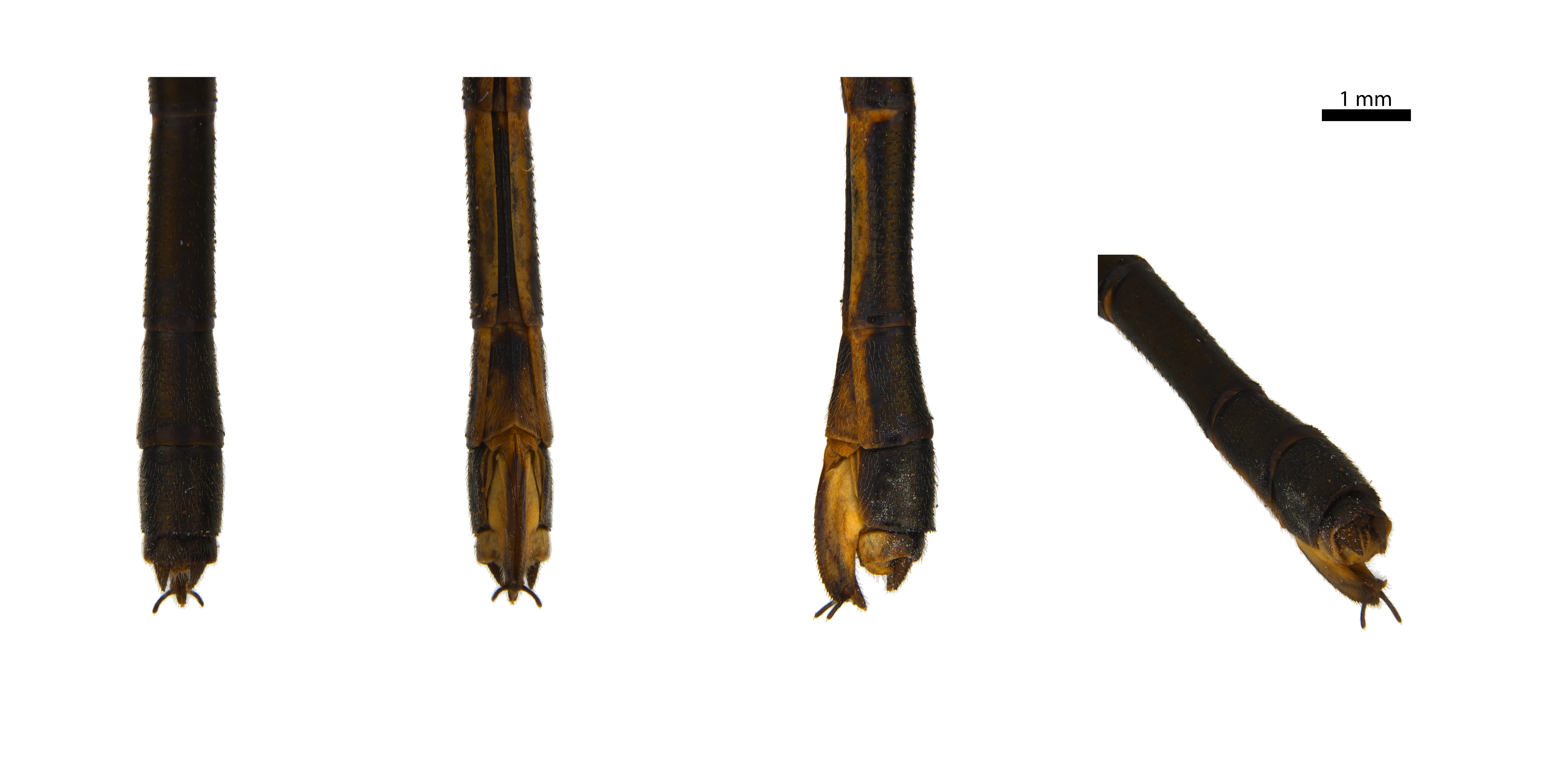
Tip of a female tail

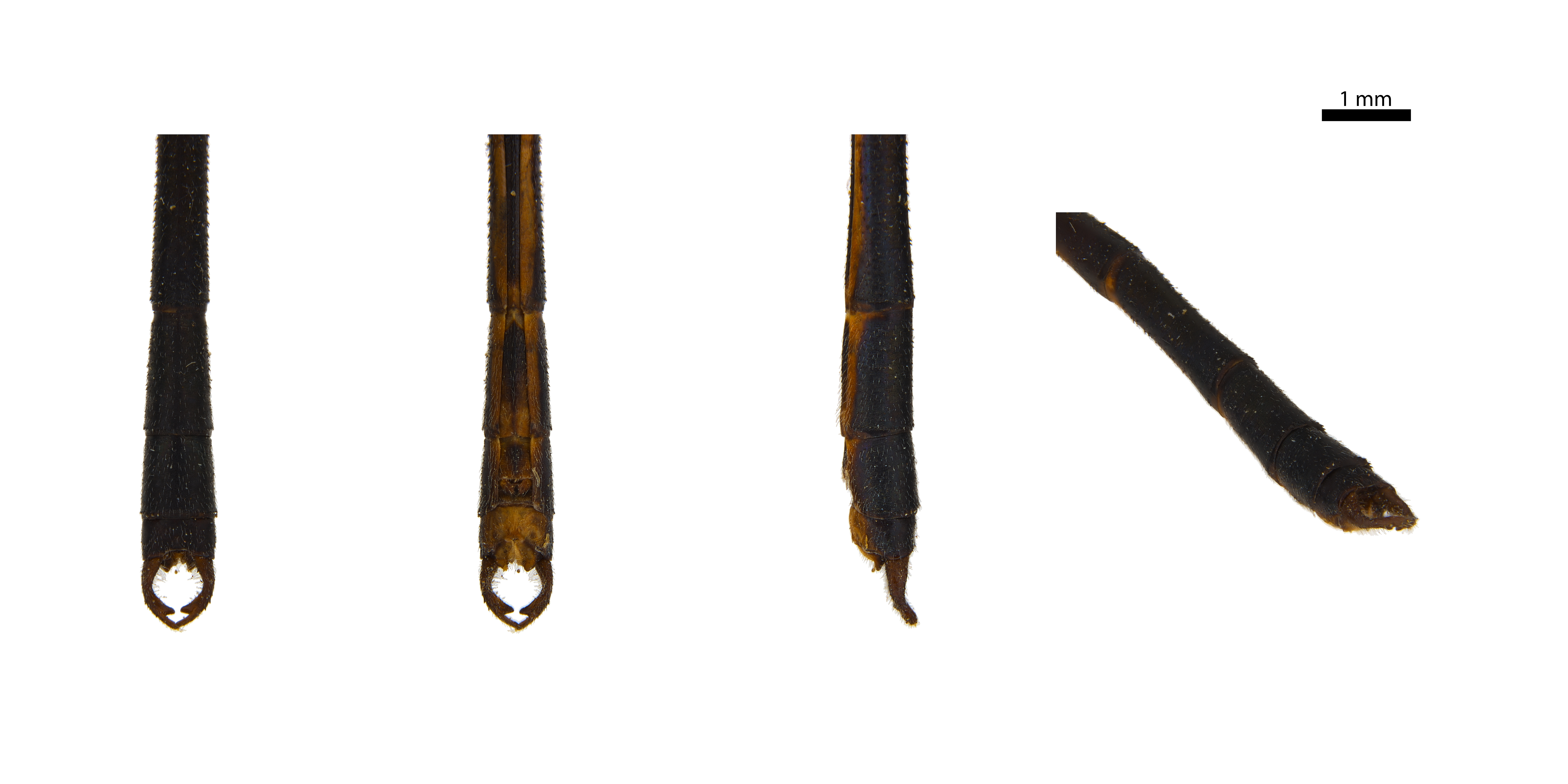
Tip of a male tail

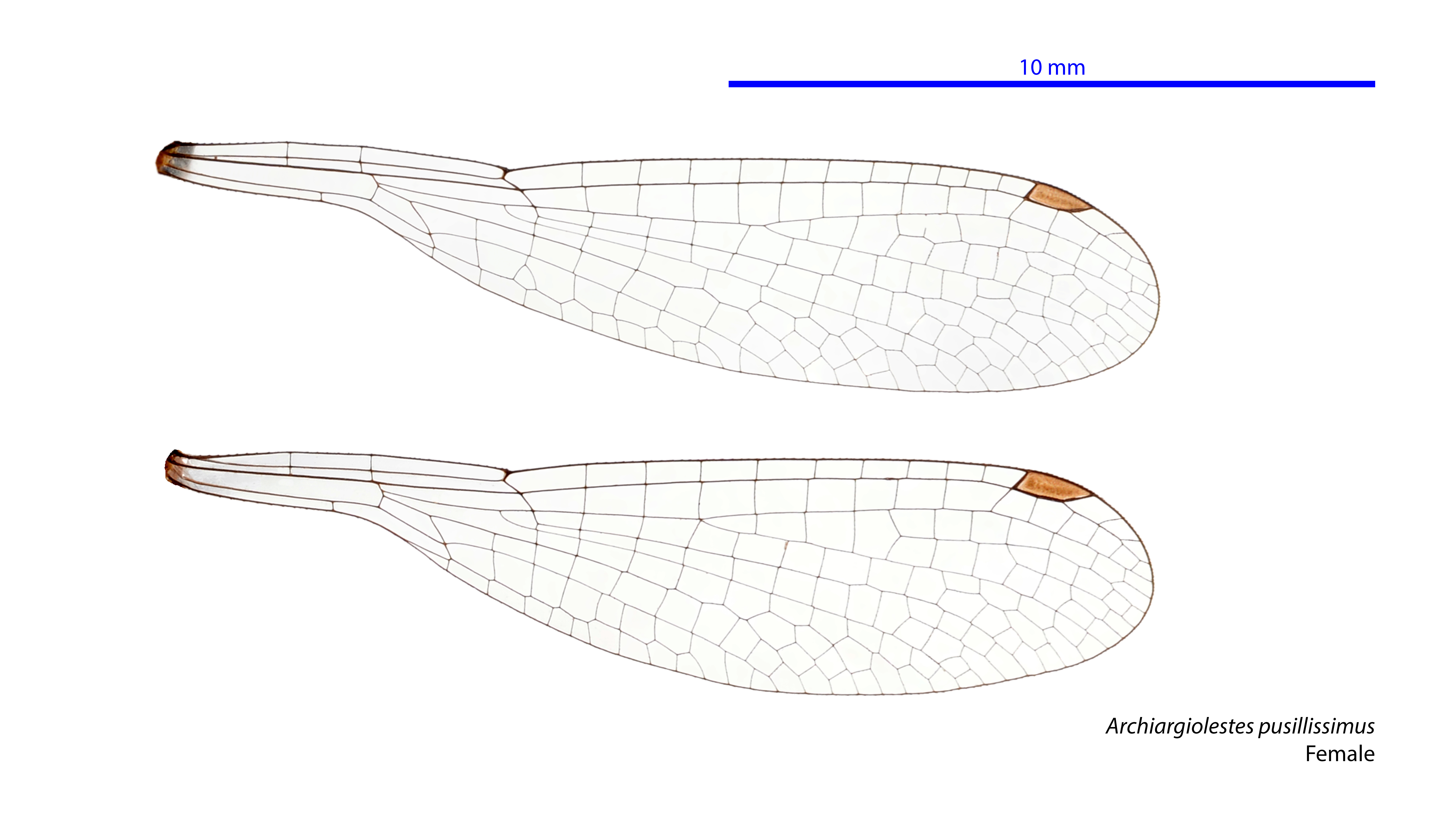
Female wings

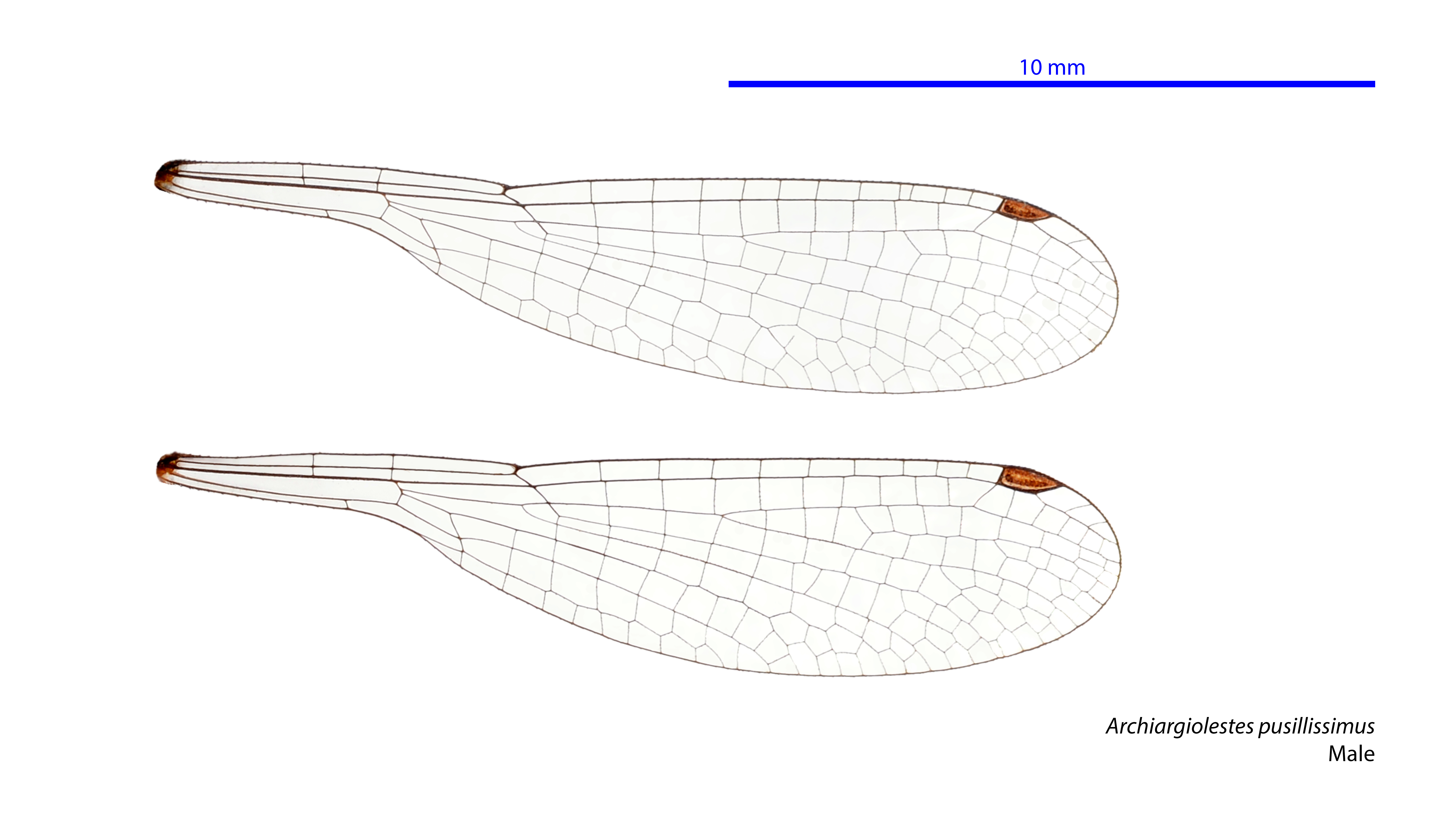
Male wings

== See also ==
- List of Odonata species of Australia
