= Austroargiolestes brookhousei =

Barrington flatwing

Conservation status
- Least Concern (IUCN 3.1)

Scientific classification
- Kingdom: Animalia
- Phylum: Arthropoda
- Clade: Pancrustacea
- Class: Insecta
- Order: Odonata
- Suborder: Zygoptera
- Family: Argiolestidae
- Genus: Austroargiolestes
- Species: A. brookhousei

Binomial name
- Austroargiolestes brookhousei Theischinger & O'Farrell, 1986

Species of damselfly

Austroargiolestes brookhousei is a species of Australian damselfly in the family Argiolestidae, commonly known as a Barrington flatwing. It is endemic to northern New South Wales, where it inhabits streams and bogs.

Austroargiolestes brookhousei is a medium-sized to large, black and pale blue damselfly, without pruinescence. Like other members of the family Argiolestidae, it rests with its wings outspread.

== Etymology ==
The genus name Austroargiolestes combines the prefix austro- (from Latin auster, meaning “south wind”, hence “southern”) with Argiolestes, the name of a related genus. It refers to a southern representative of that group.

In 1986, Günther Theischinger and Tony O'Farrell named this species brookhousei, an eponym in acknowledgement of the work of Peter Brookhouse who was responsible for collecting specimens for analysis.

== Gallery ==
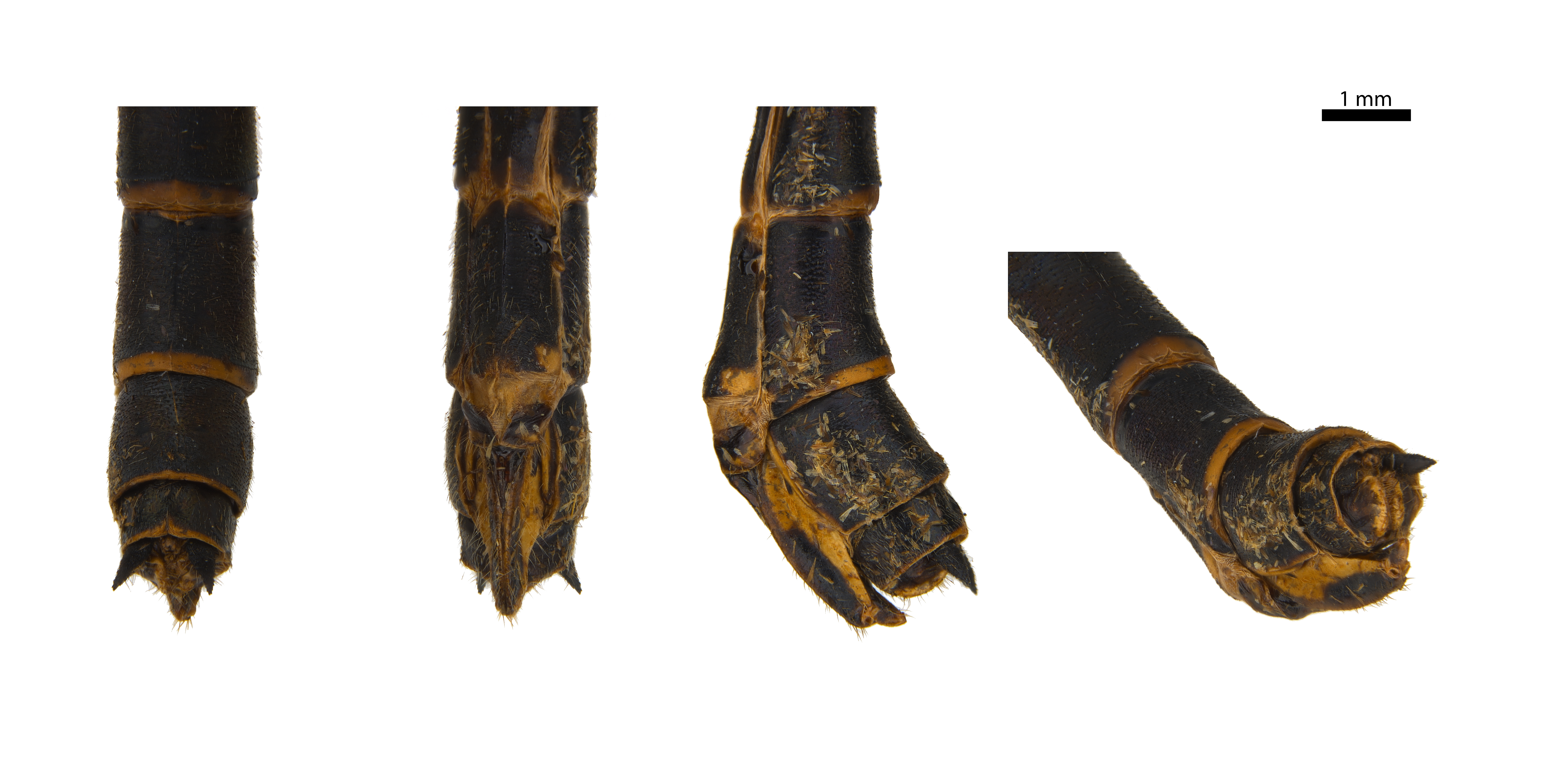
Tip of female tail

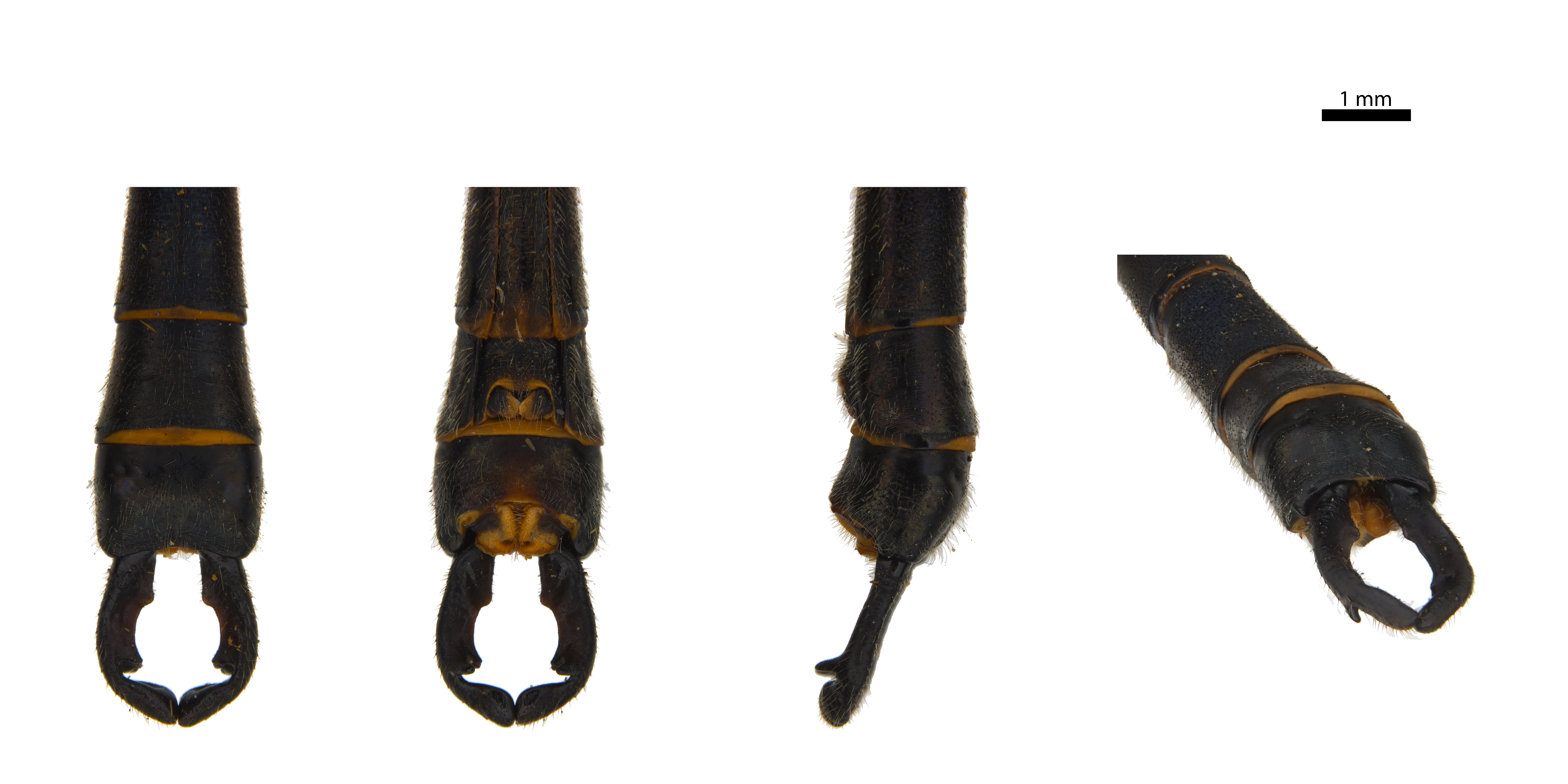
Tip of male tail

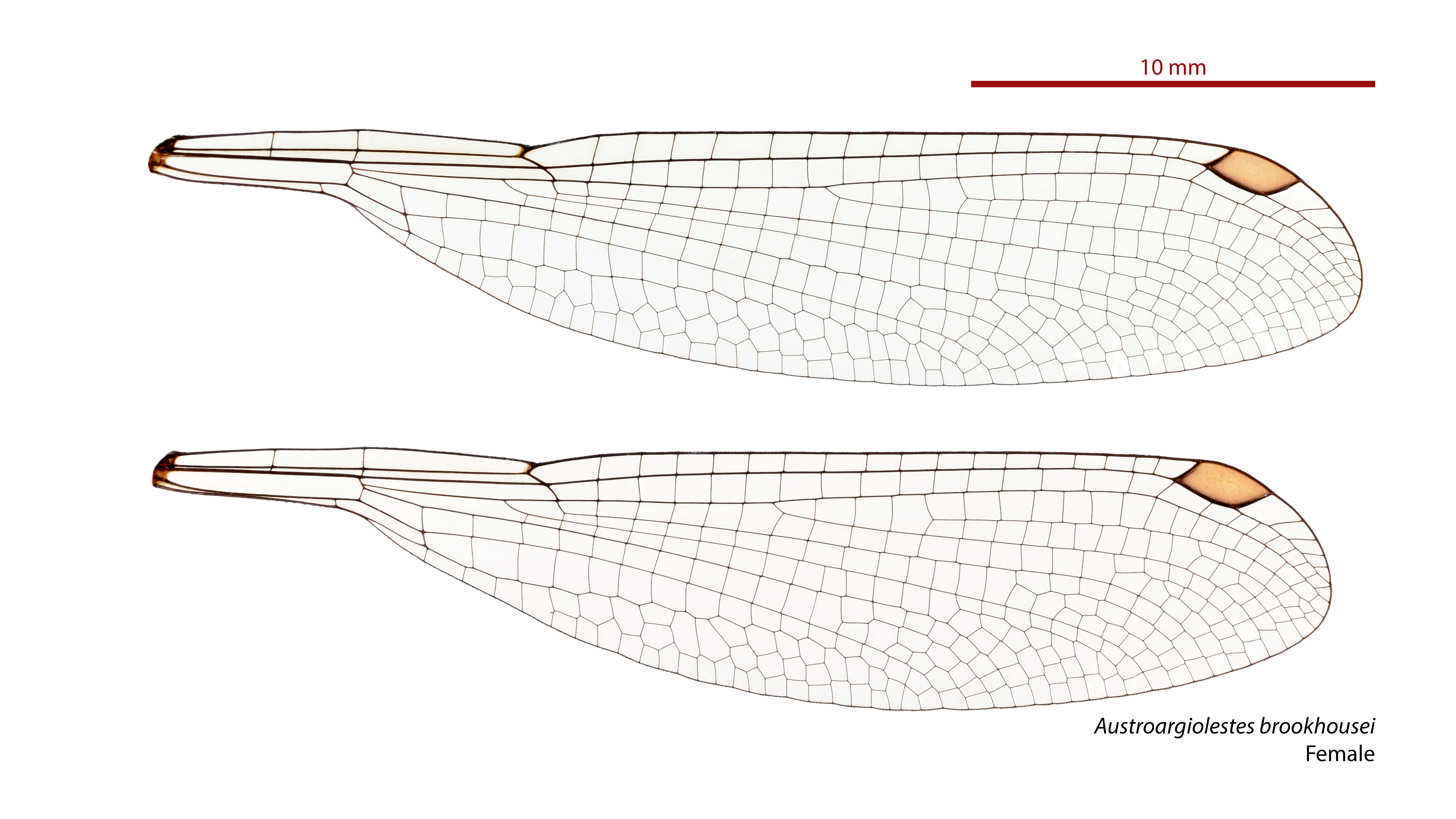
Female wings

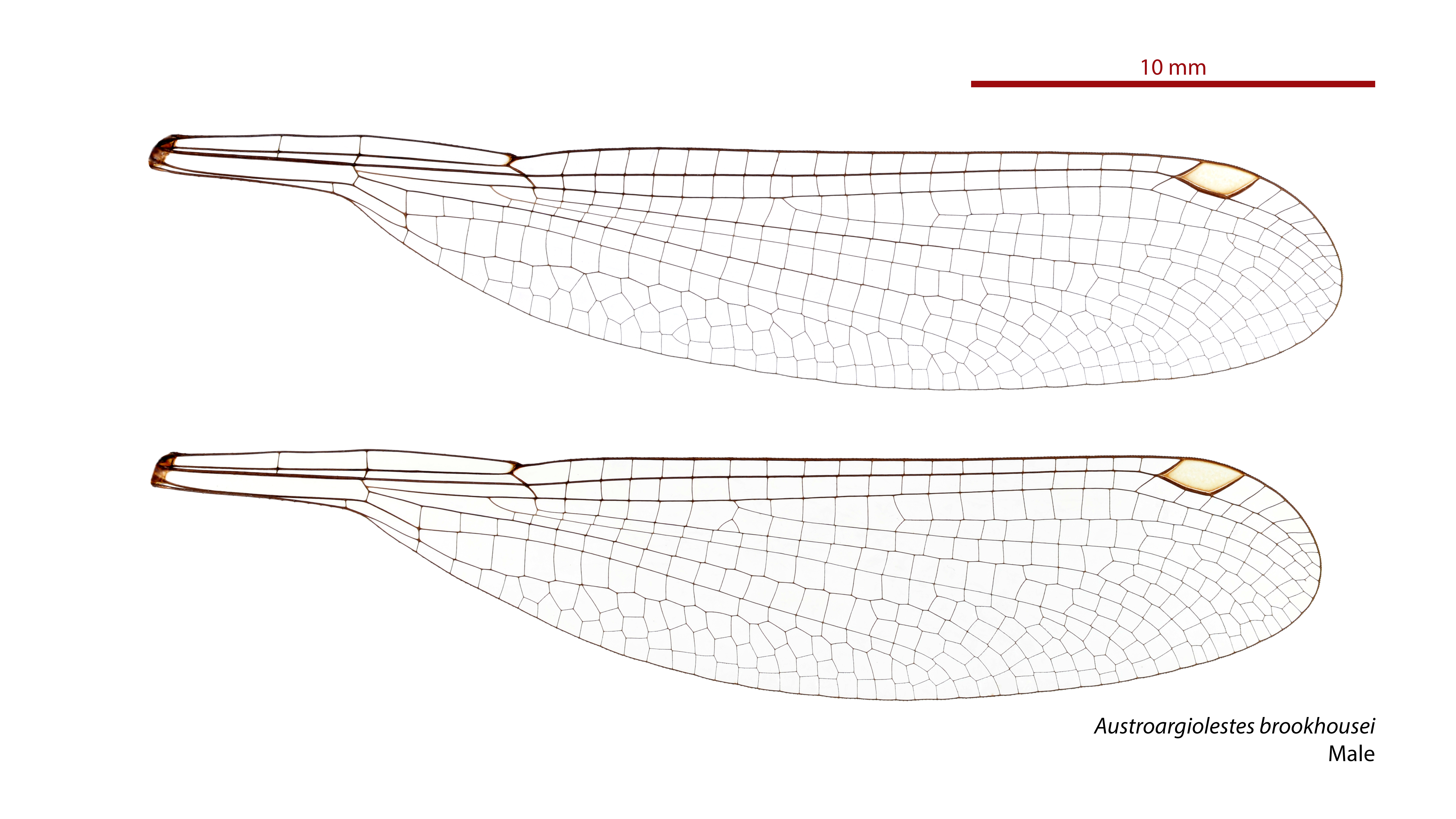
Male wings

== See also ==
- List of Odonata species of Australia
