= Archiargiolestes =

Scientific classification
- Kingdom: Animalia
- Phylum: Arthropoda
- Clade: Pancrustacea
- Class: Insecta
- Order: Odonata
- Suborder: Zygoptera
- Family: Argiolestidae
- Genus: Archiargiolestes; Kennedy, 1925

Genus of damselflies

Archiargiolestes is a genus of damselflies in the family Argiolestidae. Species of Archiargiolestes are small, black metallic damselflies with pale markings, endemic to south-western Australia, where they inhabit swampy areas.

== Etymology ==
The genus name Archiargiolestes is derived from the Greek ἀρχή (archē, "beginning") combined with Argiolestes, an existing genus of damselflies. In his description of Archiargiolestes, Kennedy wrote that it was "one of the very primitive and generalized genera of the Megapodagrioninae".

== Species ==
The genus Archiargiolestes includes the following species:

- Archiargiolestes parvulus (Watson, 1977) - midget flatwing
- Archiargiolestes pusillissimus Kennedy, 1925 - tiny flatwing
- Archiargiolestes pusillus (Tillyard, 1908) - little flatwing

== See also ==
- List of Odonata species of Australia
