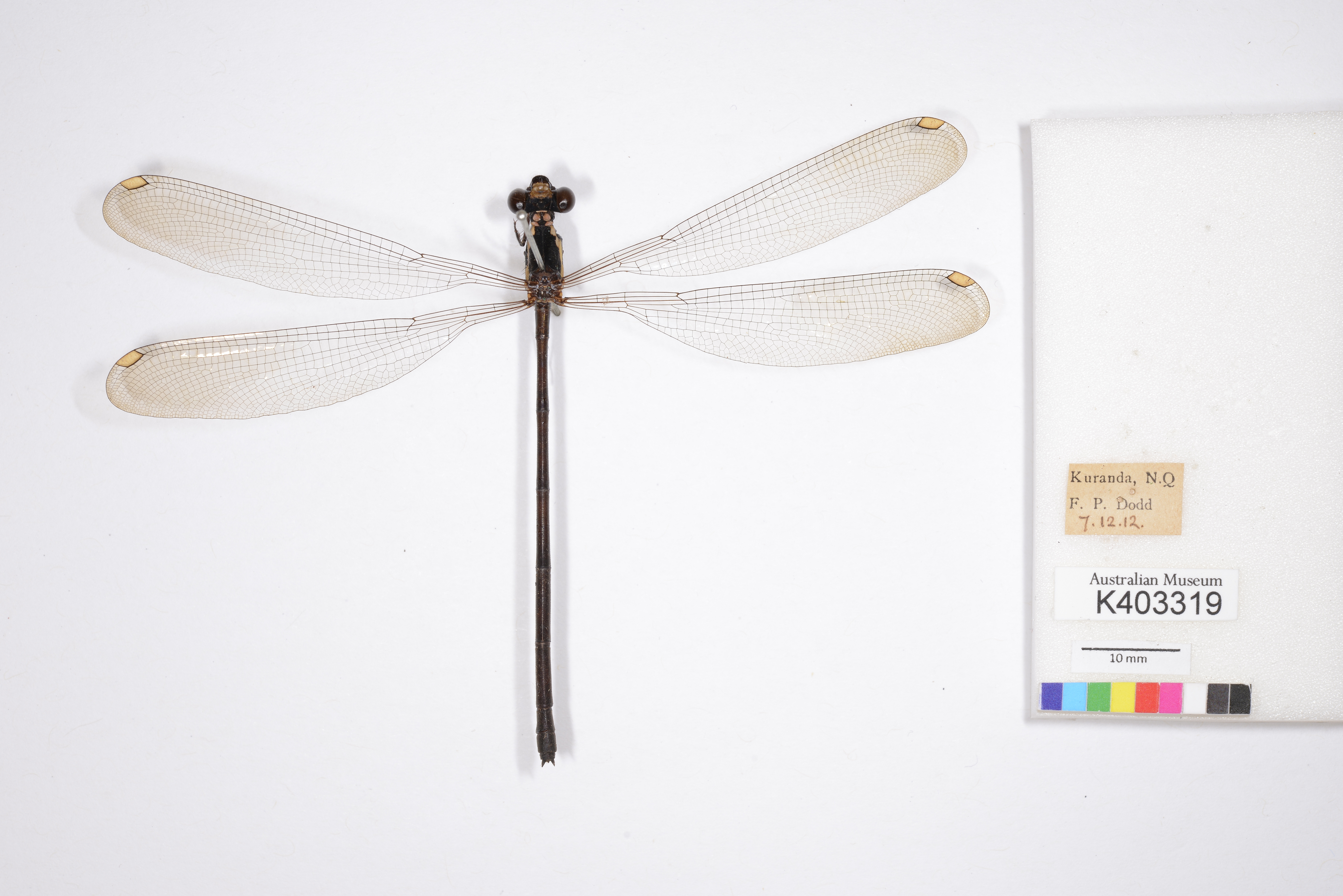
- Podopteryx selysi Australian Museum specimen

Scientific classification
- Kingdom: Animalia
- Phylum: Arthropoda
- Clade: Pancrustacea
- Class: Insecta
- Order: Odonata
- Suborder: Zygoptera
- Family: Argiolestidae
- Genus: Podopteryx; Selys, 1871

= Podopteryx =

Genus of damselflies

Podopteryx is a damselfly genus. It belongs in the family Argiolestidae. They are very large damselflies found in Indonesia, New Guinea and Australia.

== Species ==
The genus Podopteryx has three described species:

- Podopteryx casuarina Lieftinck, 1949
- Podopteryx roseonotata Selys, 1871
- Podopteryx selysi (Förster, 1899) – Treehole Flatwing

== Etymology ==
The genus name Podopteryx is derived from the Greek πούς (pous, stem ποδ-, "foot" or "leg") and πτέρυξ (pteryx, "wing"). The first element reflects its placement in the Podagrion group, to which Selys assigned Podopteryx in 1871.
