= Nesolestes =

Scientific classification
- Kingdom: Animalia
- Phylum: Arthropoda
- Clade: Pancrustacea
- Class: Insecta
- Order: Odonata
- Suborder: Zygoptera
- Family: Argiolestidae
- Subfamily: Podolestinae
- Genus: Nesolestes; Selys, 1891

Species
- Several, see text

Genus of damselflies

Nesolestes is a damselfly genus. It belongs in the family Argiolestidae.

Species include:

- Nesolestes albicauda Fraser, 1952
- Nesolestes albicolor Fraser, 1955
- Nesolestes alboterminatus Selys, 1891
- Nesolestes angydna Schmidt, 1951
- Nesolestes drocera Fraser, 1951
- Nesolestes elisabethae Lieftinck, 1965
- Nesolestes forficuloides Fraser, 1955
- Nesolestes mariae Aguesse, 1968
- Nesolestes martini Schmidt, 1951
- Nesolestes pauliani Fraser, 1951
- Nesolestes pulverulans Lieftinck, 1965
- Nesolestes radama Lieftinck, 1965
- Nesolestes ranavalona Schmidt, 1951
- Nesolestes robustus Aguesse, 1968
- Nesolestes rubristigma Martin, 1902
- Nesolestes tuberculicollis Fraser, 1949
