= Podolestinae =

Scientific classification
- Kingdom: Animalia
- Phylum: Arthropoda
- Clade: Pancrustacea
- Class: Insecta
- Order: Odonata
- Suborder: Zygoptera
- Family: Argiolestidae
- Subfamily: Podolestinae; Kalkman & Theischinger, 2013

Subfamily of damselflies

Podolestinae is a subfamily of damselflies in the family Argiolestidae. Its four genera are found in Africa, Madagascar, the Seychelles and Southeast Asia.

== Genera ==
The subfamily comprises four genera:

- Allolestes Selys, 1869
- Nesolestes Selys, 1891
- Neurolestes Selys, 1882
- Podolestes Selys, 1862

== Taxonomic history ==
Kalkman and Theischinger established Podolestinae in 2013 as one of two subfamilies of Argiolestidae.
