= Austroargiolestes isabellae =

Sydney flatwing

Conservation status
- Least Concern (IUCN 3.1)

Scientific classification
- Kingdom: Animalia
- Phylum: Arthropoda
- Clade: Pancrustacea
- Class: Insecta
- Order: Odonata
- Suborder: Zygoptera
- Family: Argiolestidae
- Genus: Austroargiolestes
- Species: A. isabellae

Binomial name
- Austroargiolestes isabellae Theischinger & O'Farrell, 1986

Species of damselfly

Austroargiolestes isabellae is a species of Australian damselfly in the family Argiolestidae, commonly known as a Sydney flatwing. Endemic to the Sydney district, it inhabits streams and boggy areas.

It is a medium-sized to large, black and pale yellow damselfly, often with some pruinescence on adult bodies . Like other members of the Argiolestidae, it rests with its wings outspread.

== Etymology ==
The genus name Austroargiolestes combines the prefix austro- (from Latin auster, meaning “south wind”, hence “southern”) with Argiolestes, the name of a related genus. It refers to a southern representative of that group.

In 1986, Günther Theischinger and Tony O'Farrell named this species isabellae, an eponym honouring Mary Isabel O’Farrell, wife of the second author.

== Gallery ==
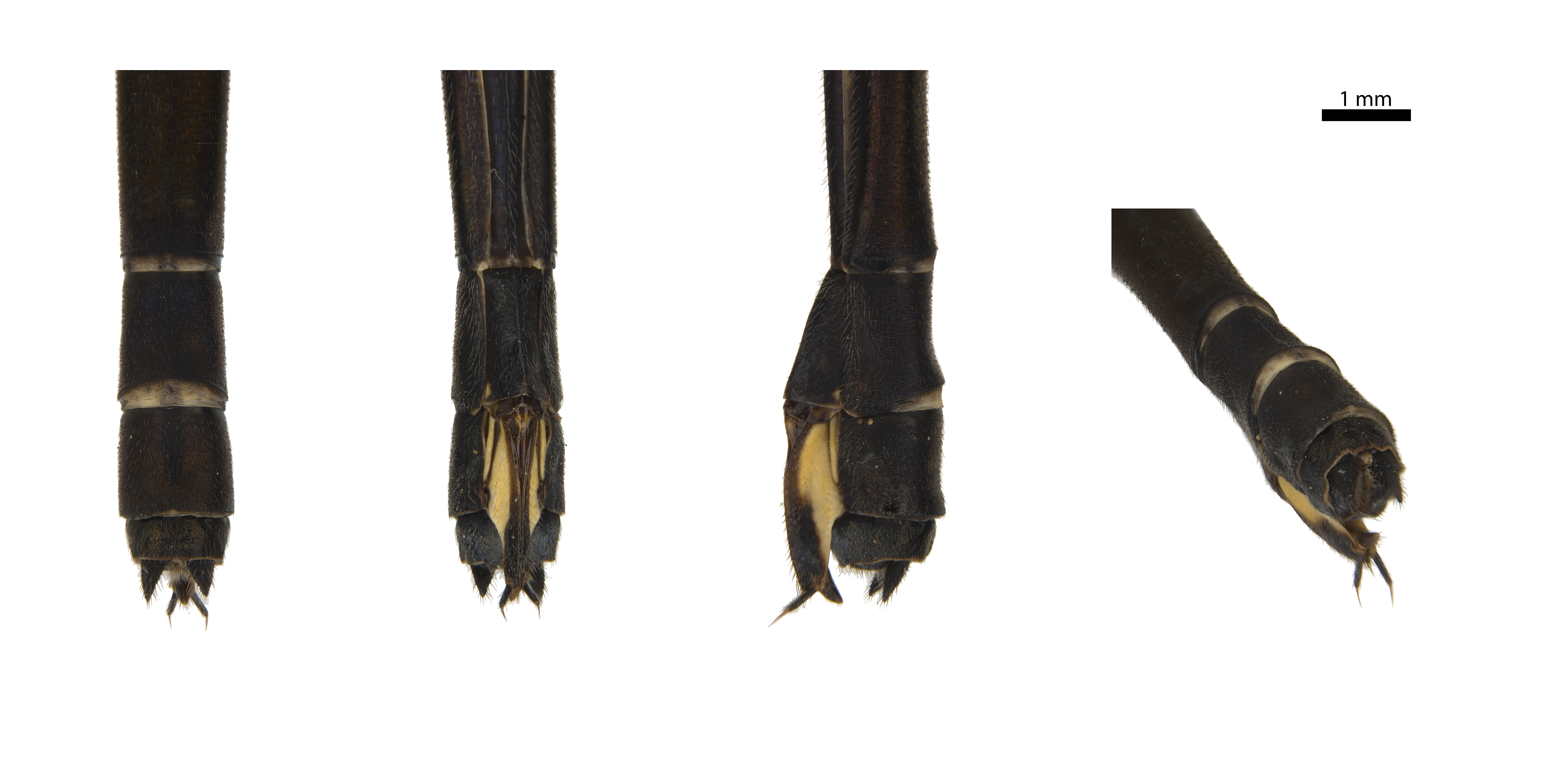
Tip of female tail

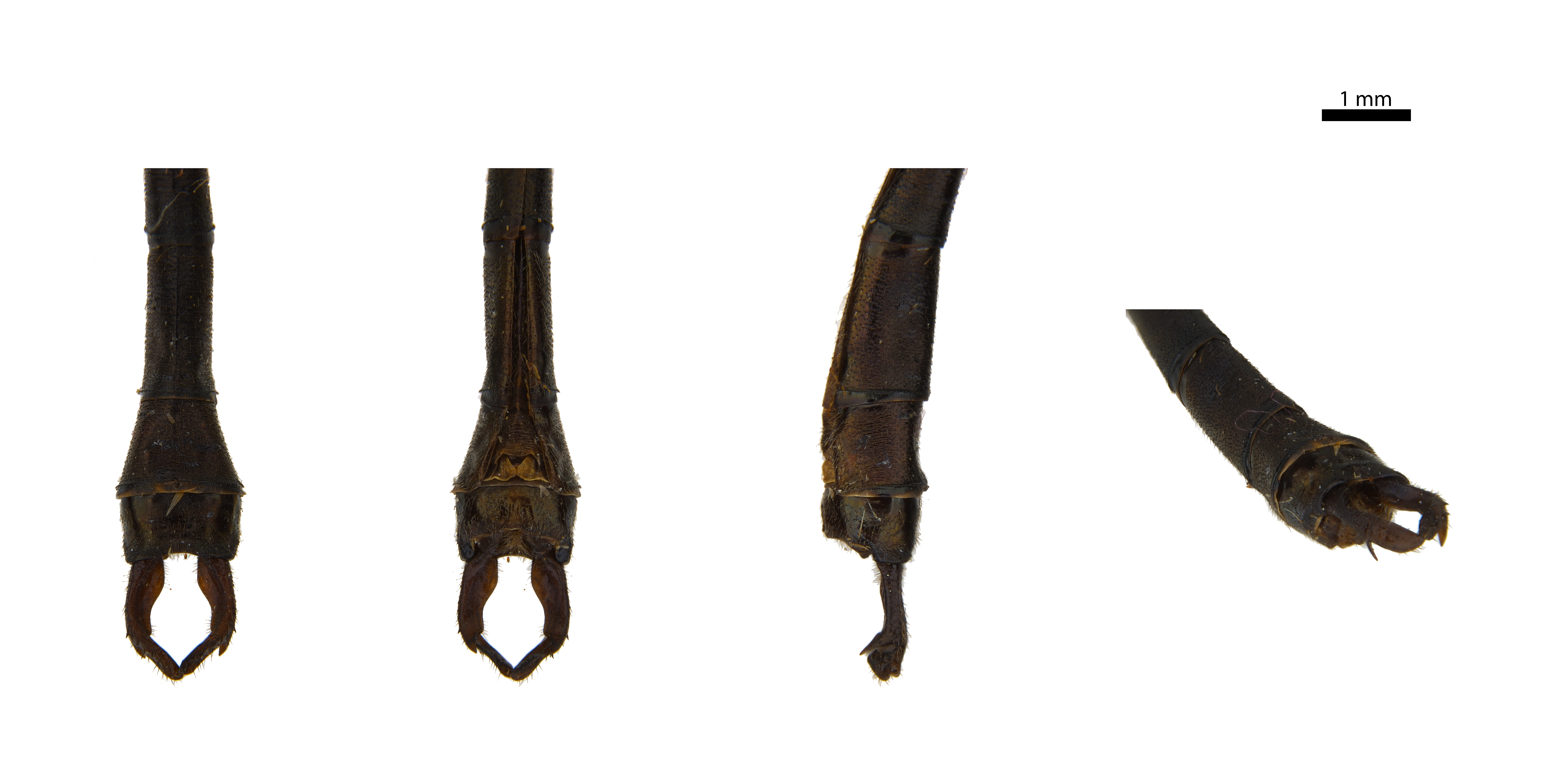
Tip of male tail

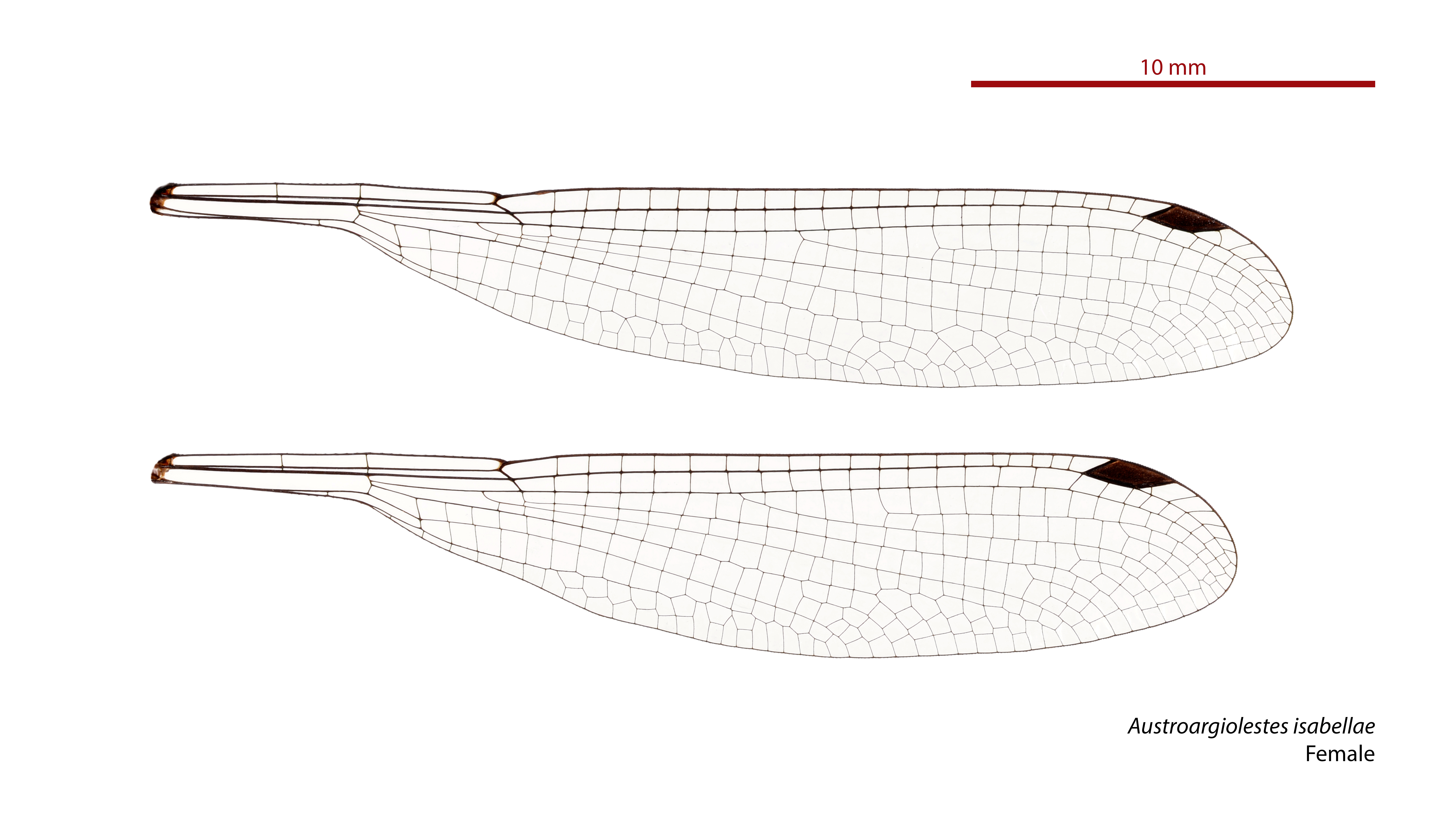
Female wings

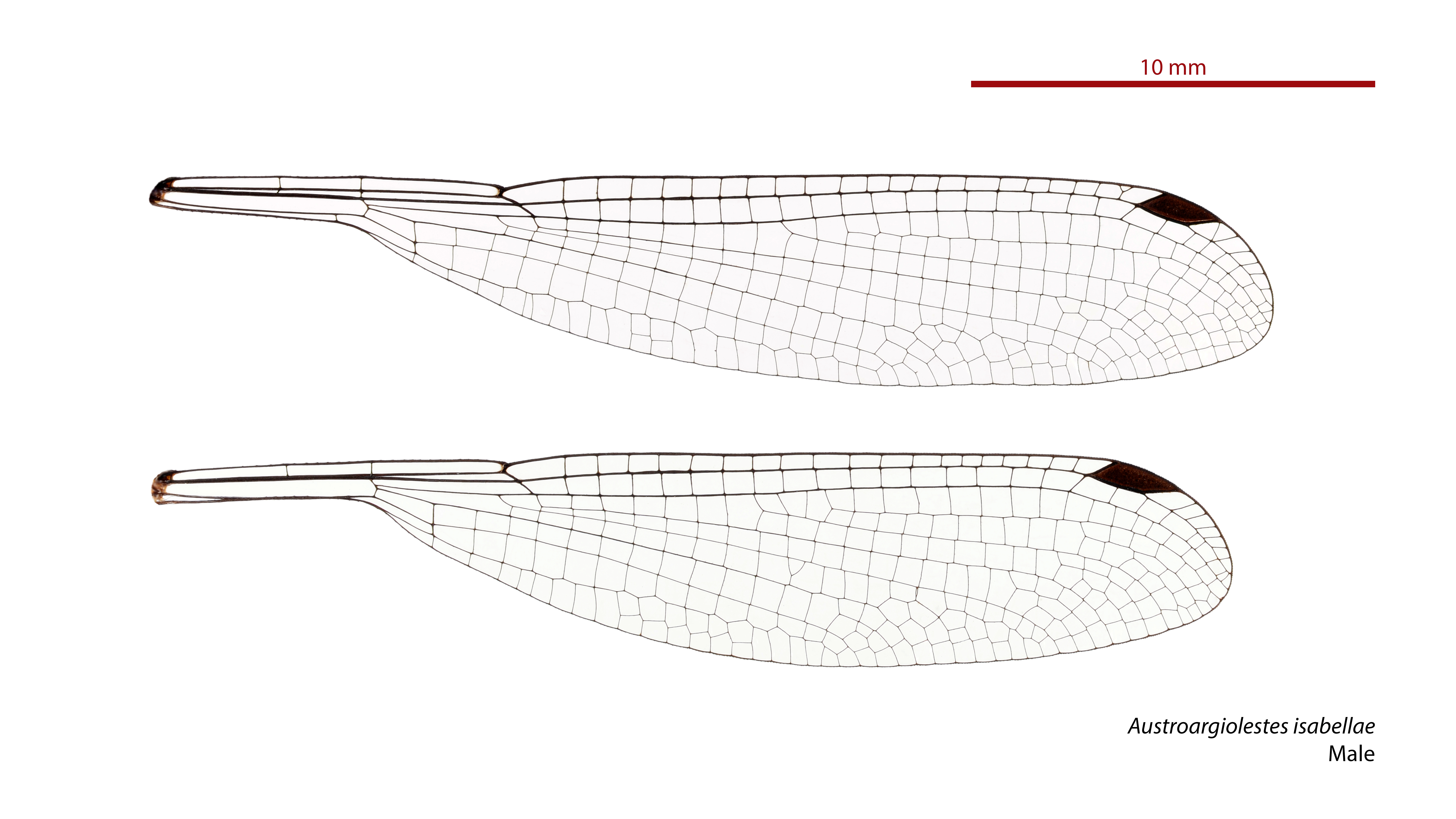
Male wings

== See also ==
- List of Odonata species of Australia
