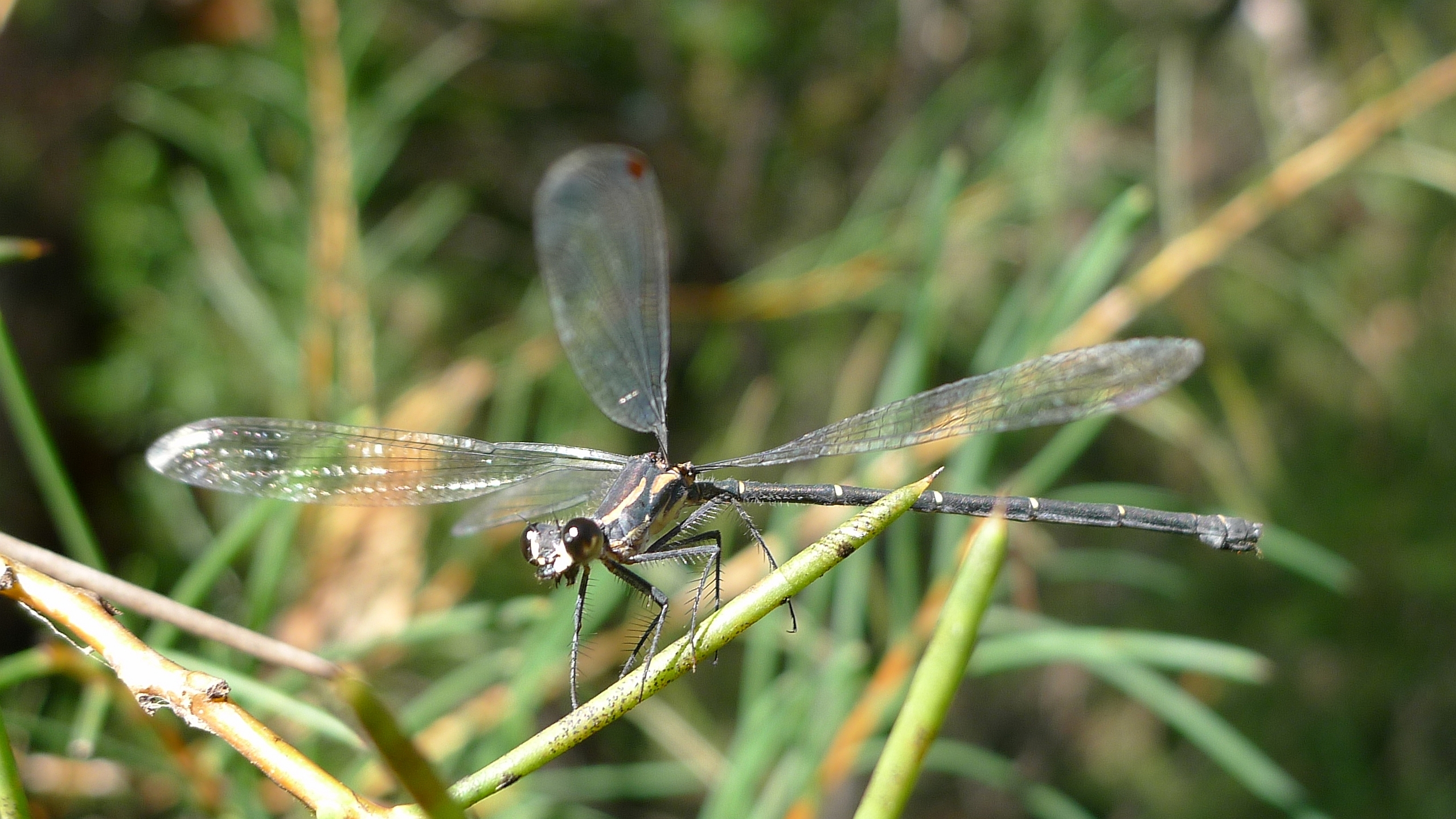
- Austroargiolestes

Scientific classification
- Kingdom: Animalia
- Phylum: Arthropoda
- Clade: Pancrustacea
- Class: Insecta
- Order: Odonata
- Suborder: Zygoptera
- Superfamily: Megapodagrionoidea
- Family: Argiolestidae; Fraser, 1957

Subfamilies
- Argiolestinae; Podolestinae
- Distribution of Argiolestidae

= Argiolestidae =

Family of damselflies

Argiolestidae is a family of damselflies in the superfamily Megapodagrionoidea. The family occurs primarily in Australia, New Guinea, New Caledonia, Southeast Asia, Madagascar and parts of Africa, with most species inhabiting forest streams and other freshwater habitats.

Members of the family are commonly known as flatwings because adults usually perch with their wings held outstretched rather than folded above the abdomen. Species are slender damselflies associated with boggy seepages, swamps and streams.

Argiolestidae was formerly treated as part of a broadly defined Megapodagrionidae. Modern molecular studies have shown that the traditional family contained numerous unrelated lineages, and Argiolestidae is now recognised as a distinct family within Calopterygoidea.

== Taxonomic history ==
In 1957 Fraser recognised Argiolestinae as a distinct subgroup within a broadly defined Megapodagrionidae. His concept of the group included numerous genera from Australasia, Asia, Africa and the Americas that are now placed in several different families. Fraser noted similarities in wing venation and larval morphology, but also recognised considerable variation among the included genera.

Subsequent studies showed that Megapodagrionidae, as traditionally defined, did not represent a natural evolutionary group. Molecular phylogenetic analyses supported the recognition of Argiolestidae as a distinct family and led to the transfer of many former members of Argiolestinae to other families, including Heteragrionidae, Philogeniidae, Philosinidae and Protolestidae.

In 2026, Carter and colleagues recognised Argiolestidae and Megapodagrionidae as the superfamily Megapodagrionoidea, reflecting their close evolutionary relationship within the revised classification of damselflies.

== Genera ==
The following genera are currently placed in Argiolestidae:

- Allolestes Selys, 1869
- Archiargiolestes Kennedy, 1925
- Argiolestes Selys, 1862
- Austroargiolestes Kennedy, 1925
- Caledargiolestes Kennedy, 1925
- Caledopteryx Kennedy, 1925
- Celebargiolestes Kennedy, 1925
- Eoargiolestes Kalkman & Theischinger, 2013
- Griseargiolestes Theischinger, 1998
- Luzonargiolestes Kalkman & Theischinger, 2013
- Metagrion Calvert, 1913
- Miniargiolestes Theischinger, 1998
- Nesolestes Selys, 1891
- Neurolestes Selys, 1882
- Podolestes Selys, 1862
- Podopteryx Selys, 1871
- Pyrrhargiolestes Kalkman & Theischinger, 2013
- Solomonargiolestes Kalkman & Theischinger, 2013
- Trineuragrion Ris, 1915
- Wahnesia Förster, 1900

== Etymology ==
The family name Argiolestidae is derived from the type genus Argiolestes, with the standard zoological suffix -idae used for animal families. The name Argiolestes is possibly formed from argio-, an anagram of agrio- (as in the genus Agrion), combined with Lestes, the name of a related genus.
